= List of Miss Dominican Republic titleholders =

This is a list of women who have won the Miss República Dominicana Universo, Miss Mundo Dominicana, Miss República Dominicana Internacional, Miss República Dominicana Tierra and Miss República Dominicana Supranacional beauty pageants.

== Miss República Dominicana titleholders ==
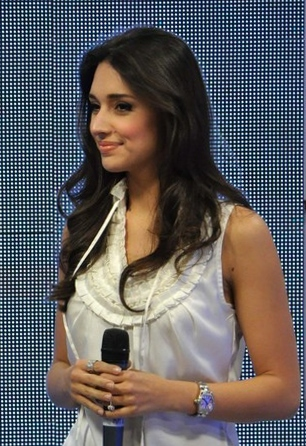
Amelia Vega, Miss Dominican Republic 2002

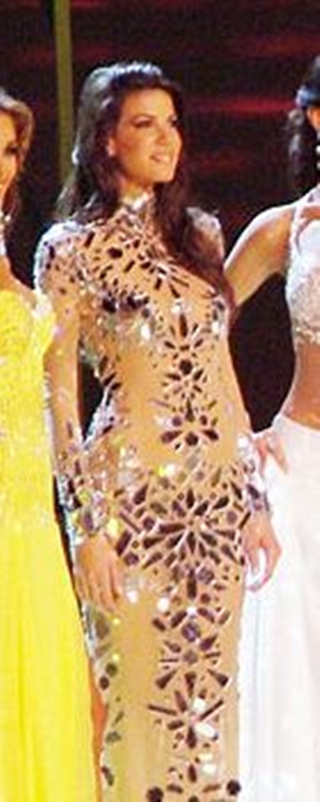
Marianne Cruz, Miss Dominican Republic 2008

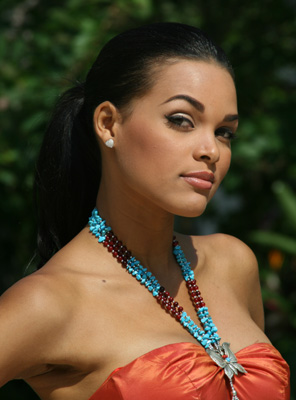
Ada Aimée de la Cruz, Miss Dominican Republic 2009

Color key

- Declared as Winner
- Ended as Runner-up
- Ended as one of the Finalists or Semi-finalists

Year	Delegate	Represented	Placement	Special Awards
1927****	Carmen Ursula Martínez Estévez	Santiago		
1928	Viviana de María Batista Ruiz	Puerto Plata		
1929	Luz Fausta Collado Bienvenido	Santo Domingo		
1952****	Laura Cristina Rodríguez Acosta	La Vega		
1953****	María Magdalena Alvarado Padrón	Duarte		
1954****	Rosa María Lama Hidalgo	La Altagracia		
1955****	Angela María Trujillo Martínez	Trujillo		
1956	Olga Fiallo	Distrito Nacional		
1957****	Belgica Margarita Mota de la Cruz	Pedernales		
1958****	Julia Cesarina Acosta Marrón	Espaillat		
1962	Sarah Olimpia Frómeta	Puerto Plata		Miss Congeniality
1963	Carmen Benicia Abinader de Benito	Santiago		
1964	Clara Edilia Chapuseaux Soñé	San Rafael		
1965	Clara Herrera	Sánchez Ramírez		
1966	Jeanette Dotel Montes de Oca	San Juan		
1967	Jeanette Rey Garcia	Duarte		
1968	Ana María Ortíz	Puerto Plata		
1969	Rocío García	Samaná		
1970	Sobeida Fernández	Valverde		
1971	Sagrario Reyes	El Seibo		
1972	Ivonne Butler	La Romana		
1973	Lily Fernández	Salcedo		
1974	Jacqueline Cabrera	Espaillat		
1975	Milvia Troncoso	Dajabón		
1976	Norma Lora	Independencia		
1977**	Blanca Aurora Sardiñas	Puerto Plata	Top 12	
1978	Raquel Jacobo	María Trinidad Sánchez		
1979	Viena Elizabeth García	Samaná		
1980	Milagros Germán Olalla	Santiago Rodríguez		
1981	Fausta Peña	Puerto Plata		
1982	Soraya Morey	San Pedro de Macorís		
1983	María Alexandra Astwood	Distrito Nacional		
1984	Sumaya Heinsen	Puerto Plata		
1985	Melba Vicens Bello	Distrito Nacional		
1986	Lissette Chamorro	Monte Cristi		
1987	Carmen Rita Pérez	Santiago		
1988	Patricia Jiménez	Duarte	Top 10	
1989	Anny Canaán	La Vega		
1990	Rosario Rodríguez	Distrito Nacional		
1991	Melissa Vargas	Santiago		
1992	Liza González	Santiago		
1993	Odalisse Rodríguez	Distrito Nacional		
1994	Vielka Yudelka Valenzuela Lama	La Vega		
1995	Cándida Lara Betances	San Cristóbal	Top 10	
1996	Sandra Abreu	La Romana		
1997	Cesarina Mejía	Azua		
1998	Selinée Méndez	Monseñor Nouel		
1999***	Luz Cecilia García Guzmán	Moca		
2000***	Gilda E. Gross Reyes	Constanza		
2001***	Claudia Cruz de los Santos	San Juan		
2002	Ruth Ocumárez Apataño	San Pedro De Macorís		
2003	Amelia Vega Polanco	Santiago	Miss Universe 2003	Best National Costume
2004	Larissa del Mar Fiallo Scanlón	La Vega		
2005	Renata Soñé Savery	Distrito Nacional	2nd Runner-up	
2006	Mía Lourdes Taveras López	Santiago		
2007	Massiel Indira Taveras Henríquez	Santiago		
2008	Marianne Elizabeth Cruz González	Hermanas Mirabal	2nd Runner-up	
2009	Ada Aimée de la Cruz Ramírez	San José de Ocoa	1st Runner-up	
2010	Eva Carolina Arias Viñas	Espaillat		
2011	Dalia Cristina Fernández Sánchez	Santiago		
2012	Carlina Durán Baldera	La Vega	Dethroned	
2012	Dulcita Lieggi Francisco	Distrito Nacional		
2013	Yaritza Miguelina Reyes Ramírez	Elías Piña	Top 10	
2014	Kimberly Altagracia Castillo Mota	Higüey		
2015	Clarissa María Molina Contreras	Espaillat	Top 10	
2016	Rosalba Garcías Andrickson	Maimón		
2017	Carmen Muñoz Guzmán	Duarte		
2018	Aldy María Bernard Bonilla	Laguna Salada		
2019	Clauvid Luz Dály Cabrera	Punta Cana	Top 20	
2020	Kímberly Marie Jiménez de León	La Romana	4th Runner-up	
2021	Debbie Áflalo Vargas	Azua		
2022	Andreína Martínez Fournier-Rosado	Dominican Community in the U.S.	2nd Runner-up	
2023	Mariana Isabel Downing	Sánchez Ramírez		
2024	María Celinée Santos Frías	Distrito Nacional	Top 30	
2025	Jennifer Ventura	Barahona	Top 30	
2026	Melissa Núñez	La Vega	TBA	

- *entered Miss World 1966
- **Handpicked
- ***Different pageant by Gatsby Dominicana Modeling Agency
- ****Didn't enter any international pageant

== Miss Mundo Dominicana titleholders ==
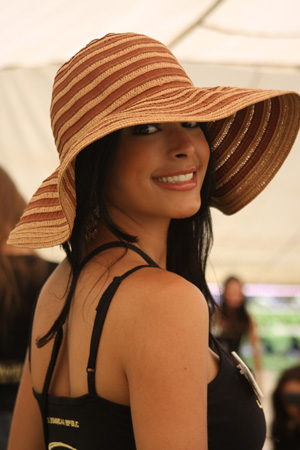
Geisha Nathali Montes de Oca, Miss Mundo Dominicana 2008

Color Key

- Declared as Winner
- Ended as Runner-up
- Ended as one of the Finalists or Semi-finalists

Year	Delegate	Province	Placement	Challenge Event Placement
1966	Jeanette Dotel Montes De Oca	San Juan	Top 15	
1967	Margarita Rosa Rueckschnat Schott	Distrito Nacional		
1968	Ingrid Marie García	Duarte		
1969	Sandra Simone Cabrera Cabral	Peravia		
1970	Fátima Magdalena Schéker Ocoa*	La Altagracia		
1971	Haydée Kuret Pacheco	Barahona		
1972	Teresa Evangelina Medrano	Puerto Plata		
1973	Clariza Duarte Garrido	Puerto Plata	Top 6	
1974	Giselle Scanlon Grullón	La Vega		
1975	Carmen Rosa Arredondo Pou	Ciudad Santo Domingo		
1976	Jenny Corporan Viñas	Santiago		
1977	Jackeline Patricia Hernández*****	La Altagracia		
1978	Jenny Polanco Rivera	Puerto Plata		
1979	Sabrina Brugal Tillan	Baoruco		
1980	Patricia Polanco Alvarez	Santiago		
1981	Josefina Maria Cuello Pérez	Duarte		
1982	Mariasela Álvarez Lebrón	Distrito Nacional	Miss World 1982	
1983	Maribel Estrella Florentino	Azua		
1984	Mayerlinne Inés de Lara	Seibo		
1985	María Trinidad González Hernández	La Altagracia		
1986	Susana Corina González Pérez	Santiago		
1987	Paula del Carmen Lora García	Salcedo		
1988	María Josefina Martínez	Santiago Rodríguez		
1989	Irma Guillermina Mauriz	Puerto Plata		
1990	Brenda Marte Lajara	Pedernales		
1991	Rosanna Rodríguez Portalatín	La Vega		
1992	Gina María Rojas Mañón	La Vega		
1993	Lynn Alvarez Klinken	La Vega		
1994	Claudia Franjul González	Peravia		
1995	Patricia Bayonet Robles	El Seibo		
1996	Idelsa Núñez Torres	Azua	Top 10	
1997	Carolina Estrella Peña	Puerto Plata		
1998	Sharmin Arelis Díaz Escoto	San Pedro de Macorís		
1999	Luz Cecilia García Guzmán	Moca		
2000	Gilda Evangelina Jovine Gross	Constanza		
2001	Jeimy Castillo Molina	Bonao		
2002	Jeimi Hernández****	Bonao		
2003	María Eugenia Vargas	Sánchez Ramírez	Top 20	
2004	Claudia Julissa Cruz Rodríguez	Monseñor Nouel	1st Runner-up	
2005	Elisa Abreu de los Santos***	La Vega		
2006	Paola Torres Cohen	Santiago		
2007	Ada Aimeé de la Cruz	San Cristóbal	Top 16	Miss World Beach Beauty
2008	Geisha Nathali Montes de Oca Robles	Distrito Nacional		
2009	Ana Rita Contreras Sosa	Monte Plata		
2010	Elizabeth Turra Brower****	Distrito Nacional		
2011	Marianly Tejada Burgos	Duarte		Miss World Sport
2012	Jenny Margarita Blanco Márquez	Valverde	Disqualified	
2012	Sally Aponte Tejada*****	Hermanas Mirabal	Top 30	
2013	Joely Bernat Rodríguez	Com. Dom. En EE.UU	Top 20	
2014	Dhío Angélica Moreno Santos	Santo Domingo Este	Top 25	
2015	Cynthia María Núñez	Duarte		
2016	Yaritza Miguelina Reyes Ramírez	Elías Piña	1st Runner-up	Beauty with a Purpose (Top 24); Miss World Sport (Top 24); Miss World Top Model (2nd Runner-up)
2017	Aletxa Marie Mueses Santana	Santiago	Top 40	Miss World Sport; Miss World Top Model (Top 30)
2018	Denise Margarita Romero Franjul	La Altagracia		
2019	Alba Marie Blair Rodríguez	La Vega		
2020	Due to the impact of COVID-19 pandemic, no pageant in 2020			
2021	Emmy Peña	Duarte	Top 40	Miss World Top Model (Top 13)
2022	Due to the impact of COVID-19 pandemic, no pageant in 2022			
2023	María Victoria Bayo	Distrito Nacional	Top 12	Miss World Top Model (Top 20)
2024	no pageant in 2024			
2025	Mayra Delgado	Distrito Nacional	Top 40	Miss World Multimedia
2026	Joheirry Mola	Distrito Nacional	Miss World 2026	

- * Entered in Miss International 1971
- ** Entered in Señorita República Dominicana 1965
- *** Semi-finalist in Miss America Latina 2006
- **** Didn't enter to any international pageant
- ***** Handpicked

== Miss República Dominicana Internacional titleholders ==
Color Key

- Declared as Winner
- Ended as Runner-up
- Ended as one of the Finalists or Semi-finalists

Year	Delegate	Province	Placement
1962	Milagros Garcia Duval	Santiago Rodríguez	
1963	Norma Guzman Simo	Espaillat	
1964	Mildred Almonte Rouas	Válverde	
1967	Vivien Susana Estrella	Santiago	
1989	Elbanira Morales de la Rosa	Azua	
1990	Vivian Aelin Calderon	Puerto Plata	
1991	Melissa Vargas	Santiago	
1992	Giselle del Carmen Abreu	Barahona	Top 15
1994	Alexia Lockhart	Santiago	
1995	Candida Lara	San Cristóbal	
1996	Sandra Abreu	La Romana	
1997	Elsa Maria Pena Rodriguez	Peravia	
1998	Sorangel Fersobe Matos	San Juan de la Maguana	
1999	Patsi Arias	Peravia	Top 15
2000	Daniela Marleny Andrade Martinez	Samaná	
2001	Belgica Judith Cury	Santo Domingo Este	Top 15
2002	Jeimi Vanessa Hernandez Franjul	Bonao	Top 12
2004	Carol Melissa Arciniegas Disla	Com. Dom. En Nueva York	
2005	Yadira Geara Cury	Espaillat	1st Runner-up
2006	Wilma Joama Abreu Nazario	Monte Plata	Top 12
2007	Ana Carolina Viñas	La Altagracia	
2008	Claudia Mabel Peña Gómez	Monseñor Nouel	
2009	Victoria Fernández	Santiago	Top 15
2010	Sofinel Báez	Santo Domingo	
2011	Catherine Ramírez Rosario	Espaillat	
2012	Melody Mir Jiménez	Santiago	3rd Runner-up
2013	Carmen Muñoz Guzmán	Santiago	
2014	Bárbara Santana	Com. Dom. En EE.UU.	
2015	Irina Peguero	La Altagracia	
2016	Cynthia Núñez	Duarte	Top 15
2017	Jennifer Valdez	Pedernales	
2018	Stéphanie Bustamante	Com. Dom. En EE.UU.	
2019	Zaidy Bello	Santo Domingo	
2020	Due to the impact of COVID-19 pandemic, no pageant in 2020		
2021	Due to the impact of COVID-19 pandemic, no pageant in 2021		
2022	Celinee Santos Frias	La Altagracia	4th Runner-up
2023	Yamilex Hernandez	La Vega	Top 15
2024	Miyuki Cruz	Santo Domingo Este	Top 20
2025	Ana Maspons	Santo Domingo Este	Top 10
2026	TBA	TBA	TBA

== Miss República Dominicana Tierra titleholders ==
Color Key

- Declared as Winner
- Ended as Runner-up
- Ended as one of the Finalists or Semi-finalists

Year	Delegate	Province/City/Community	Placement
2001	Catherine Núñez	Elías Piña	
2002	Yilda Santana	Duvergé	
2003	Suanny Frotaan	La Romana	
2004	Nileny Estevez	Santiago Rodríguez	
2005	Amell Santana	Hato Mayor	Miss Earth-Air 2005 (1st Runner-up)
2006	Alondra Peña	Puerto Plata	
2007	Themys Fabrier	Azua	Top 16
2008	Diana Flores	San Francisco de Macorís	
2009	Mariel García	San Francisco de Macoris	
2010	Wisleidy Osorio	Samaná	
2011	Sarah María Féliz Mok	Monseñor Nouel	
2012	Rocío Castellanos	Distrito Nacional	
2013	María Eugenia de los Santos	San Juan	
2014	Mayté Brito	San Cristóbal	
2015	Alexandra Parker	Monte Plata	
2016	Nicole Jimeno	Valverde	
2017	Ingrid Franco	Boca Chica	
2018	Gabriela Franceschini	Duarte	
2019	Yasmín Evangelista	Distrito Nacional	
2020	María Altagracia Villalona	Distrito Nacional	
2021	Nicole Franco	Distrito Nacional	
2022	Nieves Marcano	María Trinidad Sánchez	
2023	Elianny Capellán	Samanà	
2024	Tamara Aznar	Santo Domingo	Top 8
2025	Valeria Conde	Distrito Nacional	
2026	TBA	TBA	TBA

== Miss República Dominicana Supranacional titleholders ==
Color Key

- Declared as Winner
- Ended as Runner-up
- Ended as one of the Finalists or Semi-finalists

Year	Delegate	Province/City/Community	Placement
2009	Kirsis Celestino Jean	Distrito Nacional	
2010	Darling Cruz Roperto	Distrito Nacional	
2011	Sofinel Mariel Báez Santos	María Trinidad Sánchez	Top 20
2012	Chantel Martínez de la Cruz	Distrito Nacional	Top 20
2013	Alba Marina Aquino Marte	La Altagracia	
2014	Britney Ann Bueno	Distrito Nacional	
2015	Ingrid Mauricia Franco Alvarado	Boca Chica	
Did not compete
2017	Lia Rossis	Peravia	
2018	Yomaira de Luna	Distrito Nacional	
2019	Yaliza Burgos	Samaná	Top 25
Due to the impact of COVID-19 pandemic, no competition in 2020
2021	Eoanna Constanza Santana	Distrito Nacional	4th Runner-up
2022	Emely Altagracia Ruiz Acosta	Valverde	
2023	Crystal Matos	Distrito Nacional	Top 12
2024	Jennifer Valdez	Pedernales	
2025	Karibel Perez	Distrito Nacional	Top 24
2026	Nicole Hernández	Hermanas Mirabal	TBA
