= Miss Dominican Republic 1966 =

- Date: September 30, 1966
- Venue: La Concha Acústica del Hotel Embajador, Santo Domingo, Dominican Republic
- Broadcaster: Color Vision
- Entrants: 26
- Winner: Jeanette Dotel Montes de Ocoa; San Juan de la Maguana

Señorita República Dominicana Mundo 1966 was held on September 30, 1966. There were 26 candidates who competed for the national crown. The winner represented the Dominican Republic at Miss World 1966. The top 10 showed their evening gowns and answered questions to advance to the top 5, where they answered more questions.

== Results ==
- Señorita República Dominicana Mundo 1966: Jeanette Dotel Montes de Ocoa (San Juan de la Maguana)
- 1st Runner-up: Eva Ferro (La Altagracia)
- 2nd Runner-up: Clarisa Germán (Nueva Era)
- 3rd Runner-up: Ana Ortíz (Puerto Plata)
- 4th Runner-up: Corina Tejeda (Azua)

=== Top 10 ===
- Sarah Xavier (Ciudad Santo Domingo)
- Margarita Rueckschnat (Distrito Nacional)
- Tatiana de Las Palmas (Santiago)
- Ynes Vargas (San Pedro de Macorís)
- Cristiana Hidalgo (San Cristóbal)

=== Special awards ===
- Miss Rostro Bello – Eva Ferro (La Altagracia)
- Miss Photogenic (voted by press reporters) – Isaura Ynoa (Dajabón)
- Miss Congeniality (voted by contestants) – Lisa de Abreu (Sánchez Ramírez)

== Delegates ==
- Azua - Corina Magdalena Tejeda Sosa
- Baoruco - Claudia Jenifer Henríquez Sandro
- Barahona - Fatima Rojas de la Cruz
- Ciudad Santo Domingo - Sarah Desiree Xavier Tobias
- Dajabón - Isaura Rita Ynoa Frutos
- Distrito Nacional - Margarita Rosa Rueckschnat Schott
- Duarte - Sofia Camren Guerrero Gordon
- Espaillat - Isabela del Carmen Molina Peralta
- La Altagracia - Eva María Ferro Rodríguez
- La Vega - Ana Andreina Tatis Rodríguez
- Monte Cristi - María Altagracia Reynosa Solano
- Nueva Era - Clarisa Laura Germán Peralta
- Pedernales - Sandra María Espinoza Cardona
- Peravia - Marisol del Carmen Reyes Tosado
- Puerto Plata - Ana María Ortíz Mendoza
- Salcedo - María Caridad Espinal Espinal
- Samaná - Yurissa Marleny Goico Ramírez
- Sánchez Ramírez - Ana Elisa de Abreu Tavarez
- San Cristóbal - Cristiana Reina Hidalgo Zamora
- San Juan de la Maguana - Jeanette Dotel Montes de Ocoa
- San Pedro de Macorís - Ynes Daina Vargas Garoid
- San Rafael - Soraya Agnes Rosario Vargas
- Santiago - Tatiana de Las Palmas Cruz
- Santiago Rodríguez - Catalina Orutea Somaro Zaragoza
- Seibo - Lynedis Fernanda Hernández de la Rosa
- Valverde - Denise Cristina de Moya García

== Trivia ==
- Miss Nueva Era and Miss San Pedro de Macorís entered Miss Dominican Republic 1962.
- Miss La Altagracia entered Miss Dominican Republic 1964.
- Miss San Juan de la Maguana entered Miss Dominican Republic 1965.
- Miss Distrito Nacional entered and won Miss World at Miss Dominican Republic 1967.
- Miss Puerto Plata entered and won Miss Dominican Republic 1968.
