= Miss Dominican Republic 1998 =

- Date: 12 December 1997
- Venue: Renaissance Auditorio de Festival del Hotel Jaragua, Santo Domingo, Dominican Republic
- Broadcaster: Telemicro
- Entrants: 20
- Debuts: Com. Dom. Nueva York
- Winner: Selinée Marleny Méndez Rodríguez; Monseñor Nouel

Miss República Dominicana 1998 was held on 12 December 1997. There were 20 candidates, representing provinces and municipalities, who entered. The winner would represent the Dominican Republic at Miss Universe 1998 . The first runner up would enter Miss World 1998. The second runner up would enter in Miss International 1998. The rest of finalist entered different pageants.

== Results ==
Final results	Contestant
Miss República Dominicana 1998	Monseñor Nouel – Selinée Méndez
1st Runner-up	San Pedro de Macorís – Sharmin Díaz
2nd Runner-up	San Juan – Sorangel Fersobe
3rd Runner-up	Com. Dom. Nueva York – Jessica Brito
4th Runner-up	La Romana – Jazmina Ulloa
Semi-finalists	Santiago – Milstry Orbe; Distrito Nacional – Laura Macario; Moca – Yoneidys Mateo; Puerto Plata – Isaura Aybar; Barahona – Silvana de Lara

=== Special awards ===
- Miss Rostro Bonito – Selinée Méndez (Monseñor Nouel)
- Miss Photogenic (voted by press reporters) – Katherine Ferreira (Jarabacoa)
- Miss Belleza Rondinella – Sharmin Díaz (San Pedro de Macorís)
- Miss Congeniality (voted by Miss Dominican Republic contestants) – Joan Alcantara (San Francisco de Macorís)
- Best Provincial Costume – Tatiana Silvestre (Duvergé)
- Miss Elegancia – Selinée Méndez (Monseñor Nouel)

== Delegates ==
Represented	Contestant	Age	Height	Hometown
Azua	Eva Fermin Ulerio	22	171 cm 5 ft 7 in	Santo Domingo
Barahona	Silvana de Lara Ramírez	17	176 cm 5 ft 9 in	Santo Domingo
Com. Dom. Nueva York	Jessica Brito Perdomo	19	174 cm 5 ft 9 in	Long Island
Distrito Nacional	Laura Evelina Macario Schécker	18	182 cm 6 ft 0 in	Santo Domingo
Duvergé	Tatiana Silvestre Pérez	25	185 cm 6 ft 1 in	Duvergé
El Seibo	Maritza Fiallo Matos	21	178 cm 5 ft 10 in	Santa Cruz de El Seibo
Jarabacoa	Katherine Ferreira Nolasco	19	181 cm 5 ft 11 in	Jarabacoa
Jimaní	Ariana Plasencia García	24	182 cm 6 ft 0 in	Santo Domingo
La Altagracia	María Luisa Rojas de Espinal	21	177 cm 5 ft 10 in	Salvaleón de Higüey
La Romana	Jazmina Ulloa Rivera	20	172 cm 5 ft 8 in	La Romana
La Vega	Amparo Cruz Ortega	23	170 cm 5 ft 7 in	Jarabacoa
Moca	Yoneidys Mateo Echeverria	23	173 cm 5 ft 8 in	Moca
Monseñor Nouel	Selinée Marleny Méndez Rodríguez	22	180 cm 5 ft 11 in	Santo Domingo
Puerto Plata	Isaura Indhira Aybar Santana	17	180 cm 5 ft 11 in	San Felipe de Puerto Plata
San Cristóbal	Ana Cristina Rivera Osorio	22	180 cm 5 ft 11 in	Villa Altagracia
San Francisco de Macorís	Joan Alcántara Sued	17	175 cm 5 ft 9 in	San Francisco de Macorís
San Juan	Sorangel Cristina Fersobe Matos	20	177 cm 5 ft 10 in	San Juan de la Maguana
San Pedro de Macorís	Sharmin Arélis Díaz Escoto	19	178 cm 5 ft 10 in	Santo Domingo
Santiago	Milstry del Carmen del Orbe Gómez	21	176 cm 5 ft 9 in	Santiago de los Caballeros
Valverde	Karina Aquino Vázquez	20	186 cm 6 ft 1 in	Santiago de los Caballeros

== Trivia ==
- Merfry Then would enter again in Miss Universe Dominican Republic 2001.
