= Miss Dominican Republic 1970 =

- Date: January 24, 1970
- Venue: Palacio de las Bellas Artes, Santo Domingo, Dominican Republic
- Broadcaster: Color Vision
- Entrants: 28
- Debuts: La Romana, María Trinidad Sánchez, Nueva Era (as Independencia)
- Winner: Sobeida Alejandra Fernández Reyes; Valverde

Señorita República Dominicana 1970 was held on January 24, 1970. There were 28 candidates who competed for the national crown. The winner represented the Dominican Republic at the Miss Universe 1970. The Virreina al Miss Mundo will enter Miss World 1970 and Miss International 1971. Only the 27 province, 1 municipality entered. On the top 10 they showed their evening gown and answered questions so they could go to the top 5. In the top 5 they would answer more questions.

== Results ==
- Señorita República Dominicana 1970: Sobeida Alejandra Fernández Reyes (Valverde)
- Virreina al Miss Mundo: Fatima Magdalena Schéker Ocoa (La Altagracia)
- 1st Runner Up: Mayra Sanz (Séibo)
- 2nd Runner Up: Laura Taveraz (Distrito Nacional)
- 3rd Runner Up: Ilda Fernandez (Santiago)

=== Top 10 ===
- María Ramírez (Puerto Plata)
- María Díaz (La Romana)
- Nina Hidalgo (Baoruco)
- Iris Ynoa (Monte Cristi)
- Reyna Fabian (Barahona)

=== Special awards ===
- Miss Rostro Bello – Mayra Sanz (Séibo)
- Miss Photogenic (voted by press reporters) - Iris Ynoa (Monte Cristi)
- Miss Congeniality (voted by Miss Dominican Republic Universe contestants) - Velkis Grullon (Azua)

== Delegates ==
- Azua - Velkis Mary Grullon Alvarado
- Baoruco - Ninalkis Mate Hidalgo Dosamante
- Barahona - Ana Reyna Fabian Cruz
- Dajabón - Mercedes La Rosa de la Rosa Cruz
- Distrito Nacional - Ana Laura Taveraz Duarte
- Duarte - Soledad Edith García Moreno
- Espaillat - María Teresa del Río Valleres
- Independencia - Fior Magdalena Laughten Ruiz
- La Altagracia - Fatima Magdalena Schéker Ocoa
- La Estrelleta - Gloria María Valenciano Rijo
- La Romana - María Luisa Díaz Tejeda
- La Vega - Carmen Elena Rodríguez Figueroa
- María Trinidad Sánchez - Rosa Tatiana del Valle Santillán
- Monte Cristi - Iris Magdalena Ynoa de la Cruz
- Pedernales - Agnes Carmen Carmona Juaganes
- Peravia - Carol María Rosado Languasco
- Puerto Plata - María Alejandrina Ramírez Cruz
- Salcedo - Katherine Ynes Amelo Lozano
- Samaná - María Teresa Oviedo Meran
- Sánchez Ramírez - María Reyna Melo Ruiz
- San Cristóbal - Margarita María Reyes Fantino
- San Juan de la Maguana - María Caridad Rosario Vallenat
- San Pedro - María del Carmen Sánchez Sánchez
- Santiago - Ilda María Fernandez Sánchez y Diez
- Santiago Rodríguez - María Alejandra Sosa Guanavez
- Séibo - Mayra Angelica Sanz Marios
- Santo Domingo de Guzmán - Gloria Raquel Arcienega Ruiz
- Valverde - Sobeida Alejandra Fernández Reyes

== Trivia ==
- Puerto Plata entered in Miss Dominican Republic 1968.
