= Miss Dominican Republic 1988 =

- Date: October 12, 1987
- Venue: Casa de España, Santo Domingo, Dominican Republic
- Broadcaster: Rahintel
- Entrants: 18
- Winner: Patricia María Jiménez Brito; Duarte

Miss Dominican Republic 1988 was held on October 12, 1987. There were 18 candidates who competed for the national crown. The winner represented the Dominican Republic at the Miss Universe 1988. The first runner-up entered in Miss World 1988. The second runner-up entered Reinado Internacional del Café 1988. The rest of the finalists entered different pageants.

== Results ==
Final results	Contestant
Miss República Dominicana 1988	Duarte - Patricia Jiménez
1st Runner-up	Santiago Rodríguez - María Martínez
2nd Runner-up	Independencia - Eva Reynosa
3rd Runner-up	La Romana - Cathia Brea
4th Runner-up	Santiago - Dayni García
Semi-finalists	Valverde - Teresa de la Rosa; La Vega - Viviana Moreno; Baoruco - Miledis Collado; Puerto Plata - Elena Villanueva; Azua - Carolina Tejada

== Delegates ==
Represented	Contestant	Age	Height	Hometown
Azua	Carolina Sofía Tejada Peralta	21	1.73 m (5 ft 8 in)	Azua de Compostela
Baoruco	Miledis Perina Collado Polanco	19	1.68 m (5 ft 6 1/4 in)	Neiba
Barahona	Alfonsina Corina Lagranje Joaquín	23	1.70 m (5 ft 7 in)	Santo Domingo
Distrito Nacional	María Altagracia Silverio Guerra	22	1.80 m (5 ft 10 3/4 in)	Santo Domingo
Duarte	Patricia María Jiménez Brito	22	1.81 m (5 ft 11 1/4 in)	Santo Domingo
Espaillat	Larissa María Castíllo Paulino	23	1.82 m (5 ft 11 3/4 in)	Pedro Brand
Independencia	Eva Rosa Reynosa Durán	25	1.67 m (5 ft 5 3/4 in)	Duvergé
La Altagracia	Maylen Altagracia Susana Victorino	19	1.72 m (5 ft 7 3/4 in)	Santo Domingo
La Romana	Cathia De Los Milagros Brea Salomón	20	1.74 m (5 ft 8 1/2 in)	La Romana
La Vega	Viviana Marlyn Moreno de la Cruz	21	1.80 m (5 ft 10 3/4 in)	Concepción de La Vega
Peravia	Joselyn Chantell Rivera Vega	20	1.79 m (5 ft 10 1/2 in)	Santo Domingo
Puerto Plata	Rosa Elena Villanueva Monegra	18	1.78 m (5 ft 10 in)	Sosúa
San Cristóbal	Elizabeth Jorabel Espinosa Hidalgo	22	1.75 m (5 ft 9 in)	Santo Domingo
San Juan	Ivette Karen Peña Gómez	24	1.81 m (5 ft 11 1/4 in)	Santo Domingo
San Pedro de Macorís	Ana María Reyes Fustrano	21	1.76 m (5 ft 9 1/4 in)	Tamboril
Santiago	Dayni Karina García Rosario	18	1.80 m (5 ft 10 3/4 in)	Santiago de los Caballeros
Santiago Rodríguez	María Josefina Martínez Marte	20	1.71 m (5 ft 7 1/4 in)	San Ignacio de Sabaneta
Valverde	María Teresa de la Rosa Cid	19	1.67 m (5 ft 5 3/4 in)	Esperanza
