= Miss Dominican Republic 1997 =

- Date: 10 December 1996
- Venue: Renaissance Auditorio de Festival del Hotel Jaragua, Santo Domingo, Dominican Republic
- Broadcaster: Telemicro
- Entrants: 24
- Winner: Cesarina del Carmen Mejía Sánchez; Azua

Miss República Dominicana 1997 was held on 10 December 1996. There were 24 candidates, representing provinces and municipalities, who entered. The winner would represent the Dominican Republic at Miss Universe 1997. The first runner up would enter Miss World 1997. The second runner up would enter in Miss International 1997. The rest of finalist entered different pageants.

== Results ==
Final results	Contestant
Miss República Dominicana 1997	Azua – Cesarina Mejía
1st Runner-up	Puerto Plata – Carolina Estrella
2nd Runner-up	Peravia – Elsa Peña
3rd Runner-up	Distrito Nacional – Georgina Duluc
4th Runner-up	Santiago – Lisette Morán
Semi-finalists	Bonao – Lisa Guerrero; San Juan – Rosalía Lantigua; Salcedo – Elisa Quiñónez; Duvergé – Noelia Ferro; Villa González – Sofia Torres

== Delegates ==
Represented	Contestant	Age	Height	Hometown
Azua	Cesarina del Carmen Mejía Sánchez	19	176 cm 5 ft 9 in	Azua de Compostela
Bonao	Lisa Agnes Guerrero Macebo	20	180 cm 5 ft 11 in	Bonao
Cotuí	Jenifer Alvarez Rosario	21	175 cm 5 ft 9 in	Cotuí
Dajabón	Anna Espinoza Samboy	23	183 cm 6 ft 0 in	Dajabón
Distrito Nacional	Georgina Duluc Rizek	21	180 cm 5 ft 11 in	Santo Domingo
Duvergé	Noelia Ferro López	19	174 cm 5 ft 9 in	Santo Domingo
Hato Mayor	Yansilya Henríquez Guzmán	22	170 cm 5 ft 7 in	Santo Domingo
La Altagracia	Anyelika Vargas Colmadór	23	172 cm 5 ft 8 in	Boca de Yuma
La Romana	Elizabeth Noruega Meltón	20	171 cm 5 ft 7 in	La Romana
La Vega	Laura Polanco de los Santos	23	179 cm 5 ft 10 in	Concepción de La Vega
Monte Cristi	Emma Melo de León	25	174 cm 5 ft 9 in	Santo Domingo
Monte Plata	Paola Tavares Rosado	21	168 cm 5 ft 6 in	Santo Domingo
Pedernales	Isabel de la Cruz Hermoso	21	177 cm 5 ft 10 in	Santo Domingo
Peravia	Elsa María Peña Rodríguez	18	177 cm 5 ft 10 in	Baní
Puerto Plata	Carolina Josefina Estrella Peña	17	180 cm 5 ft 11 in	Villa Montellano
Salcedo	Elisa Quiñónez Hidalgo	20	180 cm 5 ft 11 in	Salcedo
Samaná	Lizbeth Rojas Williams	19	176 cm 5 ft 9 in	Santa Bárbara de Samaná
San José de las Matas	Eliesell Alvarado Torres	21	175 cm 5 ft 9 in	Santiago de los Caballeros
San Juan	Rosalía Catalina Lantigua Peña	19	179 cm 5 ft 10 in	San Juan de la Maguana
San Pedro de Macorís	Ibelkis de Sosa Tejeda	22	175 cm 5 ft 9 in	San Pedro de Macorís
Santiago	Lisette Emilia Morán Santos	18	182 cm 6 ft 0 in	Santiago de los Caballeros
Tamboril	Cinthia Marmolejos Cohen	18	181 cm 5 ft 11 in	Santiago de los Caballeros
Villa Bisonó	Maite Reynosa Xavier	24	179 cm 5 ft 10 in	Santiago de los Caballeros
Villa González	Sofia Torres Melo	23	177 cm 5 ft 10 in	Santiago de los Caballeros
