= Miss Dominican Republic 1991 =

- Date: August 21, 1991
- Venue: Hotel Euroctel, Puerto Plata, Dominican Republic
- Broadcaster: Rahintel Canal 7
- Entrants: 25
- Debuts: Hato Mayor
- Winner: Melissa Carolina Vargas Cardona; Santiago

Miss República Dominicana 1991 was held on August 21, 1991. There were 24 candidates, representing provinces and municipalities, who entered. The winner would represent the Dominican Republic at Miss Universe 1991 and Miss International 1991. The first runner up would enter Miss World 1991. The second runner up would enter in Miss América Latina 1991. The remaining finalists entered different pageants.

== Results ==
Final results	Contestant
Miss República Dominicana 1991	Santiago – Melissa Vargas
1st Runner-up	La Vega – Rosanna Rodríguez
2nd Runner-up	Santiago – Josefina Matos
3rd Runner-up	Santiago – Laura Longo
4th Runner-up	Azua – Christina Almanzar
Semi-finalists	Peravia – Sandra Rodriguez; Puerto Plata – Aura Rosario; Santo Domingo de Guzmán – Stephanie Olbino; Consuelo – Ana Rosario; Jarabacoa – Ana Cacénarez; Santiago – Laura Longo

== Delegates ==
Represented	Contestant	Age	Height	Hometown
Azua	Christina Marlene Almanzar Fiallo	21	1.76	Santo Domingo
Bonao	Alexandra Lorein Reyes Fustran	19	1.77	Santo Domingo
Consuelo	Ana Miguelina Rosario Tavarez	23	1.73	San Pedro de Macorís
Distrito Nacional	Sarah Carolina Toledo Medrán	17	1.80	Pedro Brand
Duvergé	Viedma Estrella Collado Zaragoza	20	1.83	Santo Domingo
Elías Piña	Laura Mary Longo Hidalgo	19	1.70	Santo Domingo
El Seibo	Elizabeth Aimeé de los Santos Cruz	24	1.83	Santo Domingo
Hato Mayor	Lisa Ericka Córdoba Melilla	17	1.68	Hato Mayor del Rey
Jarabacoa	Ana María Cacénarez Báez	22	1.84	Santo Domingo
La Altagracia	Aliesca Alejandrina Sánchez de Rojas	21	1.77	Santo Domingo
La Romana	Joana Miledis Baltazar Moreno	25	1.72	La Romana
La Vega	Rosanna Patricia Rodríguez Portalatín	18	1.79	Concepción de La Vega
Santiago	Josefina Matos	20	1.80	Santiago
Moca	Yanina María Camacho Moncada	18	1.71	Moca
Peravia	Sandra Mercede Rodriguez Tavarez	19	1.70	Baní
Puerto Plata	Aurora Liz Rosario Hollingberry	19	1.76	Altamira
Salcedo	Martha Mercedes Durán de Espinal	19	1.77	Tenares
Samaná	Ada Margarita Ynoa Williams	22	1.74	Santa Bárbara de Samaná
San Cristóbal	Nina Yanilsa de Paula Martín	17	1.80	San Cristóbal
San Juan	Geanina Odelize Xavier de Lara	24	1.78	Santo Domingo
San Pedro de Macorís	Lissette Viviana de Villanueva Sosa	21	1.79	San Pedro de Macorís
Santiago	Melissa Carolina Vargas Cardona	17	1.69	Santiago de los Caballeros
Santiago Rodríguez	Caroli Edith Monsiel Gough	22	1.73	Santo Domingo
Santo Domingo de Guzmán	Stephanie María Olbino de la Rosa	17	1.81	Santo Domingo
Valverde Mao	Edita Marienne Santana Mora	23	1.70	Santo Domingo
