= Miss Dominican Republic 1992 =

- Date: December 18, 1991
- Venue: Palacios de los Deportes, Santo Domingo, Dominican Republic
- Broadcaster: Color Vision
- Entrants: 22
- Winner: Ana Eliza González Garrido (Lisa); Santiago

Miss República Dominicana 1992 was held on December 18, 1991. There were 22 candidates, representing provinces and municipalities, who entered. The winner would represent the Dominican Republic at Miss Universe 1992. The first runner up would enter Miss World 1992. The second runner up would enter in Miss International 1992. The rest of finalist entered different pageants.

== Results ==
Final results	Contestant
Miss República Dominicana 1992	Santiago - Liza González
1st Runner-up	La Vega - Gina Rojas
2nd Runner-up	Barahona - Giselle Abreu
3rd Runner-up	Monte Plata - Julissa Meléndez
4th Runner-up	La Romana - Faride Pérez
Semi-finalists	Puerto Plata - Evelin García; Valverde Mao - Ionoris Morillo; Monseñor Nouel - Patricia Rodríguez; Distrito Nacional - Desireé Vargas; Independencia - Yinnette Súarez

== Delegates ==
Represented	Contestant	Age	Height	Hometown
Azua	Vanessa Isabel Aroyo Abreu	21	168 cm 5 ft 6 in	Santo Domingo
Barahona	Giselle del Carmen Abreu de la Rosa	19	180 cm 5 ft 11 in	Santo Domingo
Cotuí	Livia Reyna Castañeda Morazan	20	173 cm 5 ft 8 in	Santo Domingo
Dajabón	Yoneidy Mary Acosta de Espinosa	19	175 cm 5 ft 9 in	Santo Domingo
Distrito Nacional	Johanna Desireé Vargas Fiallo	17	180 cm 5 ft 11 in	Santo Domingo
El Seibo	Lorena Sujey Espinal Rosario	23	178 cm 5 ft 10 in	Santo Domingo
Hato Mayor	Ilda Sophia Fernández Urtea	22	165 cm 5 ft 5 in	Hato Mayor del Rey
Higüey	Karina Belinda Rivera Languasco	20	171 cm 5 ft 7 in	Santo Domingo
Independencia	Yinnette Catarina Súarez de Mora	19	174 cm 5 ft 9 in	Duvergé
Jarabacoa	Ana Casandra de Abreu Mejía	25	177 cm 5 ft 10 in	Santo Domingo
La Romana	Faride Carolina Johamel Pérez Colón	20	178 cm 5 ft 10 in	La Romana
La Vega	Gina María Rojas Mañón	19	177 cm 5 ft 10 in	Concepción de La Vega
Monseñor Nouel	Patricia Jackeline Rodríguez Vallejo	23	183 cm 6 ft 0 in	Bonao
Monte Plata	Julissa Germania Meléndez Orlandez	20	176 cm 5 ft 9 in	San Antonio de Yamasá
Puerto Plata	Evelin Alexandra García Martínez	17	184 cm 6 ft 0 in	San Felipe de Puerto Plata
San Francisco de Macorís	Sandra Cleopatra Noruega de la Cruz	20	176 cm 5 ft 9 in	Santo Domingo
Santiago	Ana Eliza González Garrido	18	183 cm 6 ft 0 in	San José de las Matas
Santiago Rodríguez	Eva Yalibeth Herrera Mateo	17	170 cm 5 ft 7 in	Santo Domingo
Sosúa	Sofya Marien Peralta Polanco	19	172 cm 5 ft 8 in	Sosúa
Tamboril	Anna María Cespedes Monegro	20	178 cm 5 ft 10 in	Santiago de los Caballeros
Valverde Mao	Ionoris Indirah Morillo Medrano	24	185 cm 6 ft 1 in	Santo Domingo
Yaguate	Carolina Peguero Ruiz	23	177 cm 5 ft 10 in	Santo Domingo
