= Reina Nacional de Belleza Miss República Dominicana 2009 =

- Date: September 27, 2008
- Hosts: Yadira Geara; Alfonso Guerra
- Venue: Barceló Bávaro Convention Center, Bávaro, Dominican Republic
- Broadcaster: Telemicro canal 5
- Entrants: 18
- Winner: Victoria de Jesús Fernández Tavarez; Santiago

Reina Nacional de Belleza Miss República Dominicana 2009 pageant was held at the Barceló Bávaro Convention Center in Bávaro, Dominican Republic, on September 27, 2008.

At the end of the event Vicky Fernández was crowned as RNB Miss República Dominicana 2009, she represented the Dominican Republic at the Miss International 2009 pageant which was held in Tokyo, Japan.

== Results ==
=== Placements ===
Placement	Contestant
RNB Miss República Dominicana 2009	Santiago – Vicky Fernández
1st Runner-Up	Com. Dom. EU – Mabel Valenzuela
2nd Runner-Up	Santo Domingo – Stephanie Ruiz
3rd Runner-Up	Puerto Plata – Eliana Santana
4th Runner-Up	Monseñor Nouel – Jasmine Hernández
Top 10	Hermanas Mirabal – Yasory Santana; Independencia – Sofia Echavarria; La Romana – Leidy Marte; San Cristóbal – Fatima de Paula; Valverde – Cenny Almonte

=== Special awards ===
- Miss Photogenic (voted by F3 by watchao, official photographer) - Stephanie Ruiz (Santo Domingo)
- Miss Congeniality (voted by contestants) - Mabel Valenzuela (Com. Dom. EU)
- Best Skin - Fatima de Paula (San Cristóbal)
- Best Provincial Costume - Mayerline Cruz (Santiago Rodríguez)
- Best Hair - Vicky Fernández (Santiago)
- Miss Internet (voted through www.reinanacionaldebelleza.com) - Stephanie Ruiz (Santo Domingo)
- Best Fashion Look - Jessica Salce (La Vega)
- Best Smile - Cenny Almonte (Valverde)
- Best Body - Jasmine Hernández (Monseñor Nouel)
- Most Beautiful Eyes - Jasmine Hernández (Monseñor Nouel)

=== Final Competition Scores ===
Rep.	Gown	Swimsuit	Average	Question
Santiago	9.312	9.001	9.157	9.084
Comunidad Dominicana En Estados Unidos	8.967	8.897	8.932	9.011
Santo Domingo	9.001	9.031	9.016	8.931
Puerto Plata	9.245	9.275	9.175	8.724
Monseñor Nouel	9.121	8.834	8.978	8.674
Valverde	9.021	8.610	8.816	
San Cristóbal	8.763	8.841	8.802	
Hermanas Mirabal	8.548	8.631	8.590	
Independencia	8.114	8.746	8.430	
La Romana	7.811	7.719	7.765	

Legend

Winner
First runner-up
Second runner-up
Third runner-up
Fourth runner-up
Top 10

(#) Rank in each round of competition

== Delegates ==
18 contestants competed for the title.

Province	Contestant	Age	Height	Hometown
Azua	Evelin Periel Ynoa	20	5 ft 11 in 180 cm	Santo Domingo
Baoruco	Anna Maite Suarez Sosa	25	5 ft 9 in 175 cm	Santo Domingo
Distrito Nacional	Kathelin Pérez Rosado	18	5 ft 9 in 175 cm	Santo Domingo
Duarte	Carmen Lina Minaya Reyes	19	5 ft 7 in 170 cm	San Francisco de Macorís
Estados Unidos	Mabel Valenzuela Luna	23	5 ft 10 in 178 cm	Washington Heights
Hermanas Mirabal	Yasory Santana Nin	19	5 ft 8 in 173 cm	Salcedo
Independencia	Sofia Ericka Echavarria Carrion	23	6 ft 1 in 185 cm	Duvergé
La Altagracia	Claribel Peña Matos	18	5 ft 10 in 178 cm	Bávaro
La Romana	Leidy Mary Marte Ramos	18	5 ft 6 in 168 cm	La Romana
La Vega	Jessica Magdalena Salce Manroig	21	5 ft 11 in 180 cm	Santo Domingo
Monseñor Nouel	Jasmine Hernández Camacho	22	5 ft 10 in 178 cm	Bonao
Monte Plata	Pamela Marina Cabrera Troncoso	18	5 ft 11 in 180 cm	San Rafael de Monte Plata
Puerto Plata	Eliana Alexandra Santana Arias	19	6 ft 2 in 188 cm	San Felipe de Puerto Plata
San Cristóbal	Fatima de Paula Reynosa	23	5 ft 7 in 170 cm	San Cristóbal
Santiago	Victoria de Jesús Fernández Tavarez	20	5 ft 11 in 180 cm	Santiago de los Caballeros
Santiago Rodríguez	Mayerline Cruz de las Palmas	19	5 ft 8 in 173 cm	Santiago de los Caballeros
Santo Domingo	Sthefanie Casandra Ruiz del Prado	20	5 ft 8 in 173 cm	Santo Domingo Este
Valverde	Cenny Almonte Alvardo	19	5 ft 7 in 170 cm	Santa Cruz de Mao

== Trivia ==
- Miss Puerto Plata entered in Miss Dominican Republic 2008.
