= Miss Dominican Republic 1971 =

Beauty pageant edition

- Date: January 19, 1971
- Venue: Auditorio del Bueno Café del Hotel Lina, Santo Domingo, Dominican Republic
- Broadcaster: Color Vision
- Entrants: 28
- Winner: Sagrario Margarita Reyes de los Colmenares; Séibo

Señorita República Dominicana 1971 was held on January 19, 1971. There were 28 candidates who competed for the national crown. The winner represented the Dominican Republic at the Miss Universe 1971 . The Virreina al Miss Mundo entered Miss World 1971.. Only 27 provinces and 1 municipality participated. In the Top 10, the contestants competed in the evening gown competition and answered questions to advance to the Top 5. In the Top 5, the contestants answered additional questions.

== Results ==
- Señorita República Dominicana 1971 : Sagrario Margarita Reyes de los Colmenares (Séibo)
- Virreina al Miss Mundo : Haydée Modesta Kuret Tejeda (Barahona)
- 1st Runner Up : Aida Fernandez (Distrito Nacional)
- 2nd Runner Up : Mirka Suarez (Santiago)
- 3rd Runner Up : Nidia Ureña (Puerto Plata)

Top 10

- Digna Alvarez (Valverde)
- Ana German (Santiago Rodríguez)
- Lina Rosado (Dajabón)
- Carmen Sosa (San Pedro)
- Martha Eros (Monte Cristi)

=== Special awards ===
- Miss Rostro Bello – Aida Fernandez (Distrito Nacional)
- Miss Photogenic (voted by press reporters) - Sagrario Reyes (Séibo)
- Miss Congeniality (voted by Miss Dominican Republic Universe contestants) - Digna Alvarez (Valverde)

== Delegates ==
- Azua - Cilinia Marta Parada Acosta
- Baoruco -Ana Elena Ramos Ortiz
- Barahona - Haydée Modesta Kuret Tejeda
- Dajabón - Ana Lina Rosado Batistas
- Distrito Nacional - Aida Ceneyda Fernandez Hernandez
- Duarte - Ingrid Marie Martens Abreu
- Espaillat - Desiree Agens Verdadero Lozio
- Independencia - Ana Lorena San Lorenzo Taiti
- La Altagracia - Rose Nicole Rodríguez Lony
- La Estrelleta - Rossana Cristina Villalona Moreno
- La Romana - Teresita María Sosa Cano
- La Vega - Sandra María Rodríguez Ferreira
- María Trinidad Sánchez - María Agnes Martín Morazan
- Monte Cristi - Martha María Eros Ramírez
- Pedernales - Ana Freida Holler Figal
- Peravia - Ana Carmencita Betances Lara
- Puerto Plata - Nidia María Carolina Ureña Vargas
- Salcedo - Fatima Clara Taverez Ruiz
- Samaná - Luisa María Oviedo Rey
- Sánchez Ramírez - Ana Germanialette Ríos Ynoa
- San Cristóbal - Monica Tati Madrago Reyes
- San Juan de la Maguana - Ana Zamia Zamora Suarez
- San Pedro - Carmen Ana Sosa Sosa
- Santiago - Mirka Lola Suarez Rodríguez del Limones
- Santiago Rodríguez - Ana Sandra German Abreu
- Séibo - Sagrario Margarita Reyes de los Colmenares
- Santo Domingo de Guzmán - Veronica Gloria Evete Roman
- Valverde - Digna Jan't Alvarez Ramis
