= Miss Dominican Republic 1989 =

- Date: December 19, 1988
- Venue: Palacios de los Deportes, Santo Domingo, Dominican Republic
- Broadcaster: Color Vision
- Entrants: 28
- Returns: Santo Domingo de Guzmán
- Winner: Ana María Canaán Camilo; La Vega

Miss República Dominicana 1989 was held on December 19, 1988. There were 28 candidates, representing provinces and municipalities, who entered. The winner would represent the Dominican Republic at Miss Universe 1989. The first runner up would enter Miss World 1989. The second runner up would enter in Miss International 1989. The rest of finalist entered different pageants. This is the first edition were provinces are represented and no more than one more representation.

== Results ==
Final results	Contestant
Miss República Dominicana 1989	La Vega - Anny Canaán
1st Runner-up	Puerto Plata - Irma Mauríz
2nd Runner-up	Azua - Elbanira Morales
3rd Runner-up	Santiago - Carolina Soto
4th Runner-up	Monte Cristi - Yvette Peña
5th Runner-up	Distrito Nacional - María Silverio
Semi-finalists	Barahona - Mariana Vega; El Seibo - Soelia Vaquero; Independencia - Yorlenis Elmarrado; Samaná - Simoneta Hidalgo; Valverde - Carina Ramos; San Cristóbal - Carolina Mateo

== Delegates ==
Represented	Contestant	Age	Height	Hometown
Azua	Elbanira Morales de la Rosa	20	173 cm 5 ft 8 in	Azua de Compostela
Baoruco	Luisa María Báez Bermudez	18	170 cm 5 ft 7 in	Neiba
Barahona	Mariana Vega de Bello	23	176 cm 5 ft 9 in	Santo Domingo
Dajabón	Milagros Tejeda Sosa	21	179 cm 5 ft 10 in	Santo Domingo
Distrito Nacional	María Altagracia Silverio Guerra	22	180 cm 5 ft 11 in	Santo Domingo
Duarte	Jazmin de León Veras	17	169 cm 5 ft 7 in	San Francisco de Macorís
Elías Piña	Gloria María Navarrete Mota	23	173 cm 5 ft 8 in	Santo Domingo
El Seibo	Soelia Vaquero Villa	20	183 cm 6 ft 0 in	Santo Domingo
Espaillat	Sofia Gallardo Hernández	25	183 cm 6 ft 0 in	Moca
Independencia	Yorlenis Elmarrado Valle	18	167 cm 5 ft 6 in	Santo Domingo
La Altagracia	Xiomara Carina de Lara Fernández	22	177 cm 5 ft 10 in	Santo Domingo
La Romana	Cristina Ureña Fiallo	24	182 cm 6 ft 0 in	La Romana
La Vega	Ana María Canaán Camilo	19	178 cm 5 ft 10 in	Concepción de la Vega
María Trinidad Sánchez	Noria Edith Bautista Hernández	21	178 cm 5 ft 10 in	Nagua
Monte Cristi	Yvette Peña Martínez	18	181 cm 5 ft 11 in	Santo Domingo
Pedernales	Emma Anes Reynosa Varros	18	171 cm 5 ft 7 in	Santo Domingo
Peravia	Aneida Yoselín Abreu Abreu	21	180 cm 5 ft 11 in	San José de Ocoa
Puerto Plata	Irma Guillermina Mauríz Pimentel	17	179 cm 5 ft 10 in	Santiago de los Caballeros
Salcedo	Ana Constalación Vega Burgos	18	167 cm 5 ft 6 in	Santo Domingo
Samaná	Simoneta Hidalgo Oviedo	23	174 cm 5 ft 9 in	Santiago de los Caballeros
Sánchez Ramírez	Lorena Tejada Aybar	22	180 cm 5 ft 11 in	Cotuí
San Cristóbal	Carolina Mateo Espinoza	18	183 cm 6 ft 0 in	San Cristóbal
San Juan	Ionna Marina Vargas Díaz	21	175 cm 5 ft 9 in	Santo Domingo
San Pedro de Macorís	Karina Bonelly Pou	17	172 cm 5 ft 8 in	Santo Domingo
Santiago	Carolina Josefina Soto Medrano	17	177 cm 5 ft 10 in	Santiago de los Caballeros
Santiago Rodríguez	Laura Annita Quirós Zamora	24	173 cm 5 ft 8 in	Santo Domingo
Santo Domingo de Guzmán	Lauren Amelia Gibson Torres	24	168 cm 5 ft 6 in	Santo Domingo
Valverde	Carina Yobelkis Ramos Ramos	22	179 cm 5 ft 10 in	Santa Cruz de Mao
