= Miss Dominican Republic 1986 =

- Date: December 19, 1985
- Venue: Renaissance Auditorio de Festival del Hotel Jaragua, Santo Domingo, Dominican Republic
- Broadcaster: América Latina
- Entrants: 24
- Winner: Lissette Selena Chamorro Rodríguez; Monte Cristi

Señorita República Dominicana 1986 was held on December 19, 1985. There were 18 candidates who competed for the national crown. The winner represented the Dominican Republic at the Miss Universe 1986 . The Señorita República Dominicana Mundo will enter Miss World 1986. The Señorita República Dominicana Latina will enter Miss América Latina 1986.

== Results ==
Final results	Contestant		
Señorita República Dominicana 1986	Monte Cristi - Lissette Chamorro		
Señorita República Dominicana Mundo	Santiago - Susana González		
Señorita República Dominicana Latina	La Vega - Lucía Collado		
Semi-finalists	San Juan - Eugenia Pichardo; Distrito Nacional - Jeanette McCollum; Distrito Nacional - Sigrid García; Distrito Nacional - Ana Patricia Santa Cruz Noriega	Quarter-finalists	Duarte - Lucresia Tavarez; Distrito Nacional - Margy Rosario; Baoruco - Margarita Ramos; María Trinidad Sánchez - Reyna Rodríguez; Samaná - Andrea Perdomo; Distrito Nacional - Miriam Benítez

== Delegates ==
- Azua - Ana Lucía Peralta Padrón
- Baoruco - Margarita Ramos Abreu
- Distrito Nacional - Ada Espinosa Castro
- Distrito Nacional - Jeanette McCollum Sanlley
- Distrito Nacional - Livia Pastrana Mora
- Distrito Nacional - Margy Rosario Moya
- Distrito Nacional - Milta Languasco Melo
- Distrito Nacional - Miriam Benítez Henríquez
- Distrito Nacional - Sigrid García Lavó
- Distrito Nacional - Ana Patricia Santa Cruz Noriega
- Duarte - Lucresia Tavarez Hidalgo
- La Romana - Myosotis de la Cruz Palmas
- La Vega - Lucía Josefina Collado Familia
- María Trinidad Sánchez - Reyna Rodríguez Espinal
- Monte Cristi - Lissette Selena Chamorro Rodríguez
- Pedernales - Laura Brea Tejede
- Puerto Plata - Ana Perón Morel
- Salcedo - Aurora Medina Marchena
- Samaná - Andrea Perdomo Quirós
- Sánchez Ramírez - Eva de los Santos Vargas
- San Juan - Eugenia María Pichardo Polanco
- Santiago - Cristiana Hermoso Gurabo
- Santiago - Susana González Pérez
- Santiago - Tatiana de Ramírez Veras
- Valverde - Juana Ynoa Vega
