= Miss Dominican Republic 1981 =

- Date: May 9, 1980
- Venue: Night Club La Fuente, Hotel Jaragua, Santo Domingo, Dominican Republic
- Broadcaster: Color Vision
- Entrants: 20
- Winner: Fausta Lucía Peña Veras; Puerto Plata

Señorita República Dominicana 1981 was held on May 9, 1980. There were 20 candidates who competed for the national crown. The winner represented the Dominican Republic at the Miss Universe 1981 . The Señorita República Dominicana Mundo entered Miss World 1981. The Señorita República Dominicana Café would entered Reinado Internacional del Café 1981.

== Results ==
Final results	Contestant
Señorita República Dominicana 1981	Puerto Plata - Lucía Veras
Señorita República Dominicana Mundo	Duarte - Josefina Cuello
Señorita República Dominicana Café	Santiago - Niurbis Rosario
Semi-finalists	Pedernales - Angelica Hernández; Samaná - Belkis Valencia; Seibo - Altagracia Goico
Quarter-finalists	Distrito Nacional - Jatna Tavarez; Sánchez Ramírez - Eva Espinal; Peravia - Jacqueline Batista; Baoruco - Minorka Sevilla

== Delegates ==
- Azua - Martha Landro
- Baoruco - Minorka Sevilla
- Distrito Nacional - Alicia Jerez Morillo
- Distrito Nacional - Ana María Castellanos Tatís
- Distrito Nacional - Catalina Pastrana
- Distrito Nacional - Dilia Marina Mieses Méndez
- Distrito Nacional - Jatna Tavarez Portíllo
- Distrito Nacional - Raimiris Herrera
- Duarte - Josefina María Cuello Pérez
- Elías Piña - Maira de la Cruz
- Independencia - María Isabel Cohén
- María Trinidad Sánchez - Ceneyda Acosta
- Pedernales - Angelica Hernández
- Peravia - Jacqueline Batista
- Puerto Plata - Fausta Lucía Peña Veras
- Samaná - Belkis Valencia Padrón
- Sánchez Ramírez - Eva Adam Espinal Vargas
- Santiago - Niurbis Margarita Rosario Ureña
- Seibo - Altagracia Goico Hidalgo
- Valverde - Yadira Abud Diloné
