= Miss Dominican Republic 1984 =

- Date: July 18, 1983
- Venue: Palacio de Bellas Artes, Santo Domingo, Dominican Republic
- Entrants: 18
- Winner: Sumaya Alejandrina Heinsen Pérez; Puerto Plata

Señorita República Dominicana 1984 was held on July 18, 1983. There were 18 candidates who competed for the national crown. The winner represented the Dominican Republic at the Miss Universe 1984 . The Señorita República Dominicana Mundo entered Miss World 1984. The Señorita República Dominicana Café entered Reinado Internacional del Café 1984. Only the 27 province, 1 municipality entered. On the top 10 they showed their evening gown and answered questions so they could go to the top 5. In the top 5 they would answer more questions.

== Results ==
Final results	Contestant
Señorita República Dominicana 1984	Puerto Plata - Sumaya Heinsen
Señorita República Dominicana Mundo	Monsenor Nouel - Mayelinne Ynes De Lara
Señorita República Dominicana Café	San Cristóbal - Marisol Serret
Semi-finalists	Distrito Nacional - Delfina Taveras; La Vega - Rosanna Álvarez; Santiago - Maricarmen Caba
Quarter-finalists	Distrito Nacional - Mary Angeles; Peravia - Amarilys Álvarez; Santiago Rodríguez - Cristina de Lara; Distrito Nacional - Sagris Zapete

== Delegates ==
- Azua - Dinorah Fuentes
- Dajabón - Teresa Espaillat
- Distrito Nacional - Delfina Taveras
- Distrito Nacional - Luz del Pilar Marte
- Distrito Nacional - María Altagracia Tavarez Aristy
- Distrito Nacional - Mary Angeles
- Distrito Nacional - Sagris Zapete
- Independencia - Ana del Rosario
- La Vega - Rosanna Álvarez
- Peravia - Amarilys Álvarez
- Puerto Plata - Sumaya Alejandrina Heinsen Pérez
- San Cristóbal - Marisol Carol Serret Cornielle
- San Pedro de Macorís - Ana Carina Bencosme
- Santiago - María del Carmen Caba
- Santiago - Ninoska Rivas
- Santiago Rodríguez - Cristina de Lara
- Monsenor Nouel - Mayelinne Ynes De Lara Almanzar
- Valverde - Casandra Valdez Rodríguez
