= Miss Dominican Republic 1974 =

- Date: February 2, 1974
- Venue: La Concha Acústica del Hotel Embajador, Santo Domingo, Dominican Republic
- Broadcaster: Color Vision
- Entrants: 28
- Winner: Jacqueline María Cabrera Vargas; Espaillat

Señorita República Dominicana 1974 was held on February 2, 1974. There were 28 candidates who competed for the national crown. The winner represented the Dominican Republic at the Miss Universe 1974. The Virreina al Miss Mundo will enter Miss World 1974. Only the 27 province, 1 municipality entered. On the top 10, they showed their evening gown and answered questions so they could go to the top 5. In the top 5 they would answer more questions.

== Results ==
- Señorita República Dominicana 1974: Jacqueline María Cabrera Vargas (Espaillat)
- Virreina al Miss Mundo: Giselle María Scanlon Grullón (La Vega)
- 1st Runner Up: Gina Duarte (Salcedo)
- 2nd Runner Up: Ana Rojas (Santo Domingo de Guzmán)
- 3rd Runner Up: Milvia Suarez (Santiago)

Top 10

- Isaura Ureña (Puerto Plata)
- Maira Cuello (Dajabón)
- Levi Cardona (Valverde)
- Joana Veras (Distrito Nacional)
- Digna Ferreira (Azua)

=== Special awards ===
- Miss Rostro Bello – Ana Rojas (Santo Domingo de Guzmán)
- Miss Photogenic (voted by press reporters) - Laura Tavares (Séibo)
- Miss Congeniality (voted by Miss Dominican Republic Universe contestants) - Tatiana Cruz (San Pedro)
- Best Provincial Costume - Ana Rodríguez (Santiago Rodríguez)

== Delegates ==
- Azua - Digna María Ferreira Díaz
- Baoruco - Mabel Daya Duarfte Castro
- Barahona - Edickta Melan Martínez Caba
- Dajabón - Ana Maira Cuello Victo
- Distrito Nacional - Joana Cindy Veras Terrenas
- Duarte - Julia Mildred Martes Peralta
- Espaillat - Jacqueline María Cabrera Vargas
- Independencia - Cecilia Ceneyda Rosario de Vargas
- La Altagracia - Marisela Reyna Solano Roig
- La Estrelleta - Ana Carolina Padron Zamora
- La Romana - Patria Sonia de la Cruz Salcedo
- La Vega - Giselle María Scanlon Grullón
- María Trinidad Sánchez - Janet Van Zamr Batista
- Monte Cristi - Auxiliadora Carmen Hernández Sosa
- Pedernales - Marisol Victoria del Río Pidres
- Peravia - Julisa Isaura Henriquez Marron
- Puerto Plata - Isaura Rita Ureña del Rosario Vargas
- Salcedo - Ana Gina Duarte Víllanueva
- Samaná - Lila Patricia Mendoza Sonza
- Sánchez Ramírez - Isabel Fernanda Martínez Matos
- San Cristóbal - Reyna Julie Gómez Fernández
- San Juan de la Maguana - Cristina Estafnia Ynoa Reynosa
- San Pedro - Tatiana Sandra Cruz Sosa
- Santiago - Milvia Trinidad Suarez Sánchez
- Santiago Rodríguez - Ana Gabriela Santos Rodríguez
- Séibo - Laura Carolina Tavares Batista
- Santo Domingo de Guzmán - Ana Cristina Rojas Merano
- Valverde - Levi del Mar Cardona Sierro
