= Miss Dominican Republic 1978 =

- Date: December 14, 1977
- Venue: Carnaval de la Feria del Hotel Hyatt, Santo Domingo, Dominican Republic
- Broadcaster: Color Vision
- Entrants: 28
- Debuts: La Estrelleta (as Elías Piña)
- Winner: Raquel Josefina Jacobo Jaar; María Trinidad Sánchez

Señorita República Dominicana 1978 was held on December 14, 1977. There were 28 candidates who competed for the national crown. The winner represented the Dominican Republic at the Miss Universe 1978. The Señorita República Dominicana Mundo will enter Miss World 1978. Only contestants for 27 provinces and one municipality entered. For the top 10 they showed their evening gown and answered questions so they could go to the top 5. In the top 5 they answered more questions.

== Results ==
- Señorita República Dominicana 1978: Raquel Josefina Jacobo Jaar (María Trinidad Sánchez)
- Señorita República Dominicana Mundo: Jenny del Carmen Polanco Rivera† (Puerto Plata)
- 1st Runner Up: Caridad Cabrera (San Cristóbal)
- 2nd Runner Up: Aurora Rodríguez (La Altagracia)
- 3rd Runner Up: Isaura Medina (Santiago)

Top 10

- Isabel Hoepelman (Distrito Nacional)
- María de Jesus (Barahona)
- Janet Williams (La Romana)
- Sandra Suarez (Salcedo)
- Andreina Fontan (Duarte)

=== Special awards ===
- Miss Rostro Bello: Caridad Cabrera (San Cristóbal)
- Miss Photogenic (voted by press reporters): Milka Taveras (Espaillat)
- Miss Congeniality (voted by Miss Dominican Republic Universe contestants): Maria Luisa Hernandez (Santiago Rodríguez)
- Best Provincial Costume: Fiorela Ramírez (Pedernales)

== Delegates ==
- Azua: Wilma de Alba Abreu Bircann
- Baoruco: Laura Flores Guzman Xavier
- Barahona: Ana María de Jesús Cury
- Dajabón: Alejandra Cindy Zamora Tobias
- Distrito Nacional: Isabel del Carmen Hoepelman Tactuk
- Duarte: Carmen Andreina Fontan Martínez
- Elías Piña: María José Duarte Languasco
- Espaillat: Milka Ceneyda Taveras Polanco
- Independencia: Iris María Arias Joubert
- La Altagracia: María Aurora Rodríguez Tajas
- La Romana: Janet Magdalena Williams Brito
- La Vega: María Valentina Cruz Cadiz
- María Trinidad Sánchez: Raquel Josefina Jacobo Jaar
- Monte Cristi: Juana María Peralta Quiñonez
- Pedernales: Fiorela Estefania Ramírez Diaz
- Peravia: Ana Carolina Taveras Ruiz
- Puerto Plata: Jenny del Carmen Polanco Rivera †
- Salcedo: Sandra Yamilka Suarez de las Casas
- Samaná: María Teresa Toledo Messina
- Sánchez Ramírez: Iluminada María Tobias Rosado
- San Cristóbal: Caridad Elizabeth Cabrera Santana
- San Juan de la Maguana: Magdalena Reyna German Canaán
- San Pedro de Macorís: Rosemary Casandra Ramos Reyes
- Santiago: Isaura María Medina Hernandez
- Santiago Rodríguez: Tatiana de los Angeles Caba Abikaram
- Seibo: María Caridad Tavarez Britanico
- Santo Domingo de Guzmán: María Luisa Hernandez Gomez
- Valverde: Carmen Ines Rojas Padron
