= Miss Dominican Republic 1976 =

- Date: February 23, 1976
- Venue: Carnaval de la Feria del Hotel Hyatt, Santo Domingo, Dominican Republic
- Broadcaster: Color Vision
- Entrants: 28
- Winner: Norma Eugenia Lora de Rosario del Río; Independencia

Señorita República Dominicana 1976 was held on February 23, 1976. There were 28 candidates who competed for the national crown. The winner represented the Dominican Republic at the Miss Universe 1976 . The Virreina al Miss Mundo will enter Miss World 1976. Only the 27 province, 1 municipality entered. On the top 10 they showed their evening gown and answered questions so they could go to the top 5. In the top 5 they would answer more questions.

== Results ==
- Señorita República Dominicana 1976 : Norma Eugenia Lora de Rosario del Río (Independencia)
- Virreina al Miss Mundo : Jennyfer del Carmen Corporan Viñas (Santiago)
- 1st Runner Up : Jacqueline Hernández (La Altagracia)
- 2nd Runner Up : Carmen Reynosa (Dajabón)
- 3rd Runner Up : Rosa Alvarez (Santiago Rodríguez)

Top 10

- Sandra Yañéz (Puerto Plata)
- Cindy Zamora (Distrito Nacional)
- María Tavarez (Santo Domingo de Guzmán)
- Ana Lopez (Azua)
- Auora Sánchez (Valverde)

=== Special awards ===
- Miss Rostro Bello – Rosa Alvarez (Santiago Rodríguez)
- Miss Photogenic (voted by press reporters) - Alba Costa (Séibo)
- Miss Congeniality (voted by Miss Dominican Republic Universe contestants) - Josefina Matos (San Pedro)
- Best Provincial Costume - Yajaira Caba (San Juan de la Maguana)

== Delegates ==
- Azua - Ana María Lopez Zápote
- Baoruco - Guillermina Jodi Casenares Ceutá
- Barahona - Ivette Estefanía Prieto Malla
- Dajabón - Carmen Isaura Reynosa Fantino
- Distrito Nacional - Cindy María Zamora Brachet
- Duarte - Mary Joan Suarez Buenríos
- Espaillat - Angelica María Frutos Castro
- Independencia - Norma Eugenia Lora de Rosario del Río
- La Altagracia - Jacqueline Patricia Hernández Mateo
- La Estrelleta - Agnes Miguelina Brito Trujillo
- La Romana - Digna Piedad Belmonte Bracho
- La Vega - Ana Tatiana Rodríguez Bracamonte
- María Trinidad Sánchez - María Ana Mendoza Jaen
- Monte Cristi - Sofia Alegria Jacobo Vargas
- Pedernales - Isaura Iris Oviedo Campeche
- Peravia - Ana Josefina Aquino Hidalgo
- Puerto Plata - Ana Sandra Carolina Yañéz García
- Salcedo - Marianne Viviana Lambraco Bien
- Samaná - Maira Rosa Lama Zaragoza
- Sánchez Ramírez - Rosa Yamilet Germán Cuello
- San Cristóbal - Eva María Duarte Martínez
- San Juan de la Maguana - Yajaira Rosa Caba Ruiz
- San Pedro - María Josefina Matos Ramírez
- Santiago - Jennyfer del Carmen Corporan Viñas
- Santiago Rodríguez - Rosa María Alvarez Castañeda
- Séibo - Alba Josef Costa de Rodríguez
- Santo Domingo de Guzmán - Ana María Tavarez Ferro
- Valverde - Auora Yasica Sánchez Ramones
