= Reina Nacional de Belleza Miss República Dominicana 2010 =

- Date: June 12, 2010
- Venue: Jet Set Café
- Entrants: 1
- Winner: Sofinel Báez Santos; Santo Domingo Province

Reina Nacional de Belleza Miss República Dominicana 2010 was hand-picked by the Organization of Miss Dominican Republic and the franchiser responsible to send a Dominican representative to the Miss International 2010 beauty pageant. The Reina Nacional de Belleza Miss República Dominicana 2010 pageant was postponed due to lack of money and sponsors. Instead they hand-picked Sofinel Baez, a professional model who was born in Santo Domingo and raised in the Distrito Nacional. The Official representative had her official press presentation on June 12, 2010, in the Jet Set Café in the city of Santo Domingo in the Dominican Republic. The Reina Nacional de Belleza Miss República Dominicana 2010 is 20 years old, and is 5 feet 11 inches (180 cm) tall.

== Results ==
=== Placements ===
Title	Delegate
RNB Miss República Dominicana 2010	Santo Domingo – Sofinel Báez
