= Miss Dominican Republic 1975 =

Beauty pageant

- Date: April 26, 1975
- Venue: La Concha Acústica del Hotel Embajador, Santo Domingo, Dominican Republic
- Entrants: 28
- Winner: Milvia Sofia Troncoso Hernández; Dajabón

Concurso Nacional de Belleza 1975 was held on April 26, 1975. There were 28 candidates who competed for the national crown. The winner represented the Dominican Republic at the Miss Universe 1975. Second place was crowned as the Virreina al Miss Mundo, representing the Dominican Republic at Miss World 1975.

Carmen Rosa Arrendondo Pou went on to compete at the Miss World contest as Miss Dominican Republic 1975.

== Results ==
- Señorita República Dominicana 1975 : Milvia Sofia Troncoso Hernández (Dajabón)
- Virreina al Miss Mundo : Carmen Rosa Arredondo Pou (Ciudad Santo Domingo)
- 1st Runner Up : Roberta Angelo (Santiago)
- 2nd Runner Up : Carlixta Suarez (La Estrelleta)
- 3rd Runner Up : Angelica Trono (Puerto Plata)

Top 10

- Ana Londron (Distrito Nacional)
- Sofia del Valle (Espaillat)
- Indhira Vasquez (La Vega)
- Hilda Abreu (Santiago Rodríguez)
- Denise Medina (Pedernales)

=== Special awards ===
- Miss Rostro Bello – Milvia Troncoso (Dajabón)
- Miss Photogenic (voted by press reporters) - Nidia Rosario (Azua)
- Miss Congeniality (voted by Miss Dominican Republic Universe contestants) - Yani Hidalgo (Séibo)
- Best Provincial Costume - Eva Trollo (Monte Cristi)

== Delegates ==
- Azua - Nidia Agnes Rosario Nova
- Baoruco - Levia Carmen García Oviedo
- Barahona - Martha Ines Fanton Santos
- Dajabón - Milvia Sofia Troncoso Hernández
- Distrito Nacional - Ana Carolina Londron Peralta
- Duarte - Bellanida Fernández E.
- Espaillat - Sofia Carolina del Valle Vargas
- Independencia - Gabriela Carol Rivas Duarte
- La Altagracia - Patricia Garmania Correa Suarez
- La Estrelleta - María Carlixta Suarez Ramírez
- La Romana - Cristina Desire González Ramos
- La Vega - Indhira Zamora Vasquez Garca
- María Trinidad Sánchez - Gloria Irlanda Batista Acosta
- Monte Cristi - Eva Teresa Trollo Corono
- Pedernales - Odalise Denise Medina Menna
- Peravia - Laura del Carmen Toledo Ruiz
- Puerto Plata - Angelica María Trono Velasquez
- Salcedo - Thelma Vargas
- Samaná - Nidia Antonia Rodríguez
- Sánchez Ramírez - Ana Gabriela Valdez Fabian
- San Cristóbal - Colombia Vaviana Santana Zaragoza
- San Juan de la Maguana - Estefania Yamilet Vargas Ruiz
- San Pedro - Kayla María Sosa Martínez
- Santiago - Ana María Roberta Angelo del Rosario
- Santiago Rodríguez - Hilda María Abreu Nivo
- Séibo - Yani Bereniz Hidalgo Sombras
- Santo Domingo de Guzmán - Carmen Rosa Arredondo Pou
- Valverde - María Sofia Acosta Reyes
