= Miss Dominican Republic 1983 =

- Date: August 20, 1982
- Venue: Palacio de las Bellas Artes, Santo Domingo, Dominican Republic
- Broadcaster: Color Vision
- Entrants: 19
- Winner: María Alexandra Astwood Tueni; Distrito Nacional

Miss República Dominicana 1983 was held on August 20, 1982. Nineteen candidates competed for the national crown. The winner represented the Dominican Republic at the Miss Universe 1983, Señorita República Dominicana Mundo Miss World 1983, and Señorita República Dominicana Café Reinado Internacional del Café 1983.

== Results ==
Final results	Contestant
Señorita República Dominicana 1983	Distrito Nacional - Alexandra Astwood
Señorita República Dominicana Mundo	Azua - Yonoris Estrella
Señorita República Dominicana Café	Santiago - Mariana Mejia-Ricart Bisono
1ra. Finalista	Distrito Nacional -Deisy Xiomara Rodríguez Méndez
Semi-finalists	Santiago - Rossi Falcón; Distrito Nacional - Nuria Piera; Independencia - Rosario Santana
Quarter-finalists	Monte Cristi - Marilyn Morel; Distrito Nacional - Arlette Canaán; La Altagracia - Altagracia Polanco; Puerto Plata - Martha Durán

== Delegates ==
- Azua - Yonoris Maribel Estrella Florentino
- Distrito Nacional - Annie Miguelina Hurtado
- Distrito Nacional - Arlette Canaán Decamps
- Distrito Nacional - Bernardita García Smerter
- Distrito Nacional - Ivette Peña Martínez
- Distrito Nacional - Jenny Domínguez
- Distrito Nacional - María Alexandra Astwood Tueni
- Distrito Nacional - Nuria Esperanza Piera Gainza
- Distrito Nacional -Deisy Xiomara Rodríguez Méndez
- Duarte - Mariela Carmen Sánchez Mota
- Independencia - Rosario Santana
- La Altagracia - María Altagracia Polanco
- María Trinidad Sánchez - Sandra Alvarado
- Monte Cristi - Marilyn Morel Grullón
- Peravia - Aura Ines Restituyo
- Puerto Plata - Martha Durán
- San Pedro de Macorís - Nidez Ramírez
- Santiago - Mariana Emilia Mejía Ricart
- Santiago - Rossi Falcón
- Valverde - Hildia Moreno
