= Reina Nacional de Belleza Miss República Dominicana 2007 =

Beauty pageant edition

- Date: October 27, 2006
- Venue: Auditorio de Neptuno, Boca Chica, Dominican Republic
- Broadcaster: Canal 11
- Entrants: 18
- Winner: Ana Carolina Viñas Machado; La Altagracia

The Reina Nacional de Belleza Miss República Dominicana 2007 pageant will be held on October 27, 2006. This year only 18 candidates are competing for the national crown. The chosen winner will represent the Dominican Republic at the Miss International 2007 and other small international pageant which was held in Tokyo.

== Results ==
Final results	Contestant
RNB Miss República Dominicana 2007	La Altagracia - Ana Viñas
1st Runner-up	Distrito Nacional - Aimeé Melo
2nd Runner-up	Santo Domingo - Yisney Lagrange
3rd Runner-up	Puerto Plata - Sheila Castíllo
4th Runner-up	Peravia - Mariela Rosario
Semi-finalists	Santiago - Karina Betances; Duarte - Paola Saint-Hilaire; La Romana - Alina Espinal; Monte Cristi - Grace Mota; Com. Dom. EU - Sandra Tavares

=== Special awards ===
- Miss Photogenic (voted by press reporters) - Catherine Ramírez (La Vega)
- Miss Congeniality (voted by Miss Dominican Republic Universe contestants) - Alina Espinal (La Romana)
- Best Face - Aimeé Melo (Distrito Nacional)
- Best Provincial Costume - Mariela Rosario (Peravia)
- Best Hair - Daniela Peguero (San Cristóbal)
- Miss Elegancia - Fania Marte (Valverde)

== Delegates ==
Represented	Contestant	Age	Height	Hometown
Azua	Alicia Fernández de la Cruz	23	169 cm 5 ft 7 in	Santo Domingo
Barahona	Lucía Magdalena Alvarado Suarez	20	171 cm 5 ft 7 in	Santo Domingo
Com. Dom. EU	Sandra Elisabeth Tavares Ruíz	19	180 cm 5 ft 11 in	Newark
Distrito Nacional	Aimeé Elaine Melo Hernández	23	173 cm 5 ft 8 in	Santo Domingo
Duarte	Paola Saint-Hilaire Arias	20	179 cm 5 ft 10 in	Santiago de los Caballeros
Espaillat	Angela María García Ruíz	26	177 cm 5 ft 10 in	Moca
Independencia	Joany Marleny Sosa Peralta	20	182 cm 6 ft 0 in	Jimaní
La Altagracia	Ana Carolina Viñas Machado	22	184 cm 6 ft 0 in	Santiago de los Caballeros
La Romana	Alina Charlin Espinal Luna	19	181 cm 5 ft 11 in	La Romana
La Vega	Catherine Mabel Ramírez Rosario	21	183 cm 6 ft 0 in	Santiago de los Caballeros
Monte Cristi	Grace Stephany Mota Grisanty	18	175 cm 5 ft 9 in	San Fernando de Monte Cristi
Peravia	Mariela Joselin Rosario Jiménez	25	186 cm 6 ft 1 in	Santo Domingo
Puerto Plata	Sheila Massiel Castíllo Domínguez	18	183 cm 6 ft 0 in	Altamira
Salcedo	Rossemely Cruz Logroño	26	176 cm 5 ft 9 in	Salcedo
San Cristóbal	Daniela Teresa Peguero Brito	24	174 cm 5 ft 9 in	Santo Domingo
Santiago	Karina Luisa Betances Cabrera	21	180 cm 5 ft 11 in	Santiago de los Caballeros
Santo Domingo	Yisney Lina Lagrange Méndez	19	182 cm 6 ft 0 in	Pedro Brand
Valverde	Fania Miguelina Marte Lozada	22	173 cm 5 ft 8 in	Mao

== Trivia ==
- Miss Peravia and Miss Distrito Nacional entered in Miss Dominican Republic Universe 2006.
- Miss La Vega would enter in Miss Dominican Republic 2010
