= Miss Dominican Republic 1964 =

- Date: January 31, 1964
- Venue: La Concha Acústica del Hotel Embajador, Santo Domingo, Dominican Republic
- Broadcaster: Color Vision
- Entrants: 12
- Debuts: Isla Catalina
- Winner: Clara Edilia Chapuseaux Soñé; San Rafael

Señorita República Dominicana 1964 was held on January 31, 1964. 12 candidates are competed for the national crown. The winner represented the Dominican Republic at the Miss Universe 1964 . The first runner up will enter Miss International 1964. Only the 16 province entered. On the top 6 they showed their swimsuit and answered questions so they could go to the top 3. In the top 3 they would answer more questions. There are only 12 delegates due to the reason low economy in each province and the country.

== Results ==
- Señorita República Dominicana 1964 : Clara Edilia Chapuseaux Soñé (San Rafael)
- 1st Runner Up : Mildred Almonte (Valverde)
- 2nd Runner Up : Georgia Garrido (Puerto Plata)

Top 6

- Eva Ferro (Isla Catalina)
- Ingrid Balboa (Santiago)
- Lorena Valle (Distrito Nacional)

=== Special awards ===
- Miss Rostro Bello - Catalina Areva (La Vega)
- Miss Photogenic (voted by press reporters) - Georgia Garrido (Puerto Plata)
- Miss Congeniality (voted by Miss Dominican Republic Universe contestants) - Margara Espinal (Santiago Rodríguez)

== Delegates ==
- Azua - Rosa Ceneyda de la Rosa Montas
- Distrito Nacional - Lorena Carolina Valle Canoa
- Espaillat - Ana Gabriela Mota Reyes
- Isla Catalina - Eva María Ferro Rodríguez
- La Vega - Catalina Aresminda Areva Ovao
- Puerto Plata - Georgia de Dolores Garrido Rosario
- Samaná - Fernanda Malisa de Castro Williams
- San Rafael - Clara Edilia Chapuseaux Soñé
- Santiago - Ingrid Maroa Balboa Cameron
- Santiago Rodríguez - Margara Carolina Espinal Espinal
- Séibo - Altagracia Reyna Hidalgo Wines
- Valverde - Mildred Farina Almonte Rouas

== Trivia ==
- Miss Isla Catalina is the youngest sister Miss Colón from Miss Dominican Republic 1956.
