= Miss Dominican Republic 1979 =

Beauty Pageant in the Dominican Republic

- Date: December 20, 1978
- Venue: Carnaval de la Feria del Hotel Hyatt, Santo Domingo, Dominican Republic
- Entrants: 28
- Winner: Elizabeth García Javier; Samaná

Señorita República Dominicana 1979 was held on December 20, 1978. There were 28 candidates who competed for the national crown. The winner represented the Dominican Republic at the Miss Universe 1979 . The Señorita República Dominicana Mundo entered Miss World 1979.

== Results ==
- Señorita República Dominicana 1979 : Elizabeth García Javier (Samaná)
- Señorita República Dominicana Mundo : Sabrina Alejandrina Brugal Tillan (Baoruco)
- 1st Runner Up : Carina Trujillo (Santiago)
- 2nd Runner Up : Mireya Cordoba (Puerto Plata)
- 3rd Runner Up : Antonieta Paz (Peravia)

Top 10

- Lucia Abreu (Monte Cristi)
- Casandra Montas (La Romana)
- Josefina del Sol (Espaillat)
- Julisa Duarte (San Pedro de Macorís)
- Rita González (La Vega)

=== Special awards ===
- Miss Rostro Bello - Viena García (Samaná)
- Miss Photogenic (voted by press reporters) - Alejandra Fermin (Independencia)
- Miss Congeniality (voted by Miss Dominican Republic Universe contestants) - Aida Lozano (Valverde)
- Best Provincial Costume - Estefania Ramos (Dajabón)

== Delegates ==
- Azua - Alejandra Viviana Lazaro Espinal
- Baoruco - Sabrina Alejandrina Brugal Tillan
- Barahona - Fatima Tatiana Sosa Martínez
- Dajabón - Estefania Carolina Ramos Acosta
- Distrito Nacional - Sandra Magdalena Castillo Reyes
- Duarte - Janet Desireth Santana Acosta
- Elías Piña - Diana del Carmen Rosario Toledo
- Espaillat - Josefina María del Sol Tomillo
- Independencia - Alejandra Edilia Fermin Gúzman
- La Altagracia - Carmen Antonieta Cruz Ureña
- La Romana - Casandra Joselyn Montas de Jesus
- La Vega - Rita Ynes González Sánchez
- María Trinidad Sánchez - Veronica Marina Ruiz Cabrera
- Monte Cristi - Lucia Teresa Abreu Fontana
- Pedernales - Laura Angelica Alvarado Sanz
- Peravia - Antonieta Margarita Paz Vargas
- Puerto Plata - María Mireya Cordoba Rosario
- Salcedo - María Valentina Alvarez Fabian
- Samaná - Viena Elizabeth García Javier
- Sánchez Ramírez - María Janibeth Rosado Xavier
- San Cristóbal - Laura Lucia Alonso Santos
- San Juan de la Maguana - Alba María Oviedo Prieto
- San Pedro de Macorís - María Julisa Duarte Castro
- Santiago - Carina Martina Trujillo Ramírez
- Santiago Rodríguez - Johanna Agnes Rosario Vargas
- Seibo - María India Marcano Domenech
- Santo Domingo de Guzmán - Ioana Emilia Ovieda Moro
- Valverde - Aida Agnes Lozano Carrasco
