= Miss Dominican Republic 1985 =

- Date: May 5, 1984
- Venue: Hotel Lina Santo Domingo, Dominican Republic
- Entrants: 24
- Winner: Melba Altagracia Vicéns Bello (Miss Universe 1985); Distrito Nacional; Mariela Gonzalez Hernandez (Miss World 1985); Santiago

Concurso Nacional de Belleza 1985 was held on May 5, 1984. There were 24 candidates who competed for the national crown. The winner of the Miss Dominican Republic title represented the Dominican Republic at the Miss Universe 1985. The Señorita República Dominicana Mundo entered Miss World 1985. The Señorita República Dominicana Café entered Reinado Internacional del Café 1985.

== Results ==
Final results	Contestant
Miss República Dominicana Universo 1985	Distrito Nacional - Melba Vicéns
Miss República Dominicana Mundo 1985	Santiago - Mariela González Hernandez
Semi-finalists	La Vega - Olivia Oviedo; María Trinidad Sánchez - María Batista; Distrito Nacional - Thania Castillo
Quarter-finalists	Distrito Nacional - Sigrid Sánchez; Monte Cristi - Miledy López; Santiago - Andrea Rosado; Espaillat - Sofia Ureña; Azua - Yocasta Reyes; Distrito Nacional - Maritza del Villar

== Delegates ==
- Azua - Yocasta Reyes Fernández
- Azua - Marina Medina
- Barahona - Laura Soto
- Distrito Nacional - Marielly Rodríguez
- Distrito Nacional - Maritza del Villar
- Distrito Nacional - Thania Castillo
- Distrito Nacional - Sigrid Angiolina Sánchez Pichardo
- Distrito Nacional - Melba Altagracia Vicéns Bello
- Distrito Nacional - Zelba Delgado
- Distrito Nacional - Tammy Berroa
- Espaillat - Sofia Ureña
- La Romana - Mayra Perón
- La Vega - Olivia Oviedo
- La Vega - Sarah Tavares
- María Trinidad Sánchez - María Mercedes Batista
- Monte Cristi - Miledy López
- Puerto Plata - Belkis Hidalgo
- Salcedo - Rita Elvira Marques
- Santiago - Mariela González Hernández
- Santiago - Josefina González
- Santiago Rodríguez - Mary Elisa Collado
- Valverde - Cesarina de Moya
