= Miss Dominican Republic 1963 =

- Date: January 29, 1963
- Venue: La Concha Acústica del Hotel Embajador, Santo Domingo, Dominican Republic
- Broadcaster: Color Vision
- Entrants: 14
- Winner: Carmen Benicia Abinader de Benito; Santiago

Señorita República Dominicana 1963 was held on January 29, 1963. There were 14 candidates who competed for the national crown. The Miss Azúcar represented the Dominican Republic at the Miss Universe 1963 . The Miss Café will enter Miss International 1963. The Miss Merengue will enter Feria de la Chinita. Only the 14 province entered. On the top 10 they showed their evening gown and answered questions so they could go to the top 5. In the top 5 they would answer more questions. There are only 14 delegates due to the reason low economy in each province and the country.

== Results ==
Final results	Contestant
Miss Azúcar	Santiago - Carmen Abinader
Miss Café	Espaillat - Norma Guzmán
Miss Merengue	Puerto Plata - Laura Montoya
Semi-finalists	Distrito Nacional - Marlene Overo; La Vega - Elbira Sisco; Pedernales - Emiliana Covas

=== Special awards ===
- Miss Rostro Bello - Ricarda de la Cruz (Santiago Rodríguez)
- Miss Photogenic (voted by press reporters) - Cariana Tavarez (Samaná )
- Miss Congeniality (voted by Miss Dominican Republic Universe contestants) - Amada Mendoza (Valverde)

== Delegates ==
- Azua - Eva Ceneyda Fermin Rosalindo
- Distrito Nacional - Marlene Fidelina Overo Prieto
- Duarte - Marilin Paolina Bustamante Reynosa
- Espaillat - Norma Laurita Guzmán Simo
- La Vega - Ana Elbira Sisco Cariado
- Nueva Era - Andreina Agnes Posla Peralta
- Pedernales - Emiliana Carina Covas Peran
- Puerto Plata - Laura Urea Montoya Castro
- Salcedo - Maite Mariala Ynoa Tatis
- Samaná - Cariana Carlixta Tavarez Tomarillo
- Santiago - Carmen Benicia Abinader de Benito
- Santiago Rodríguez - Ricarda de la Cruz
- Séibo - Viviana Juana Rioja Rojas
- Valverde - Amada Miguela Mendoza Amaris
