= Miss Dominican Republic 1990 =

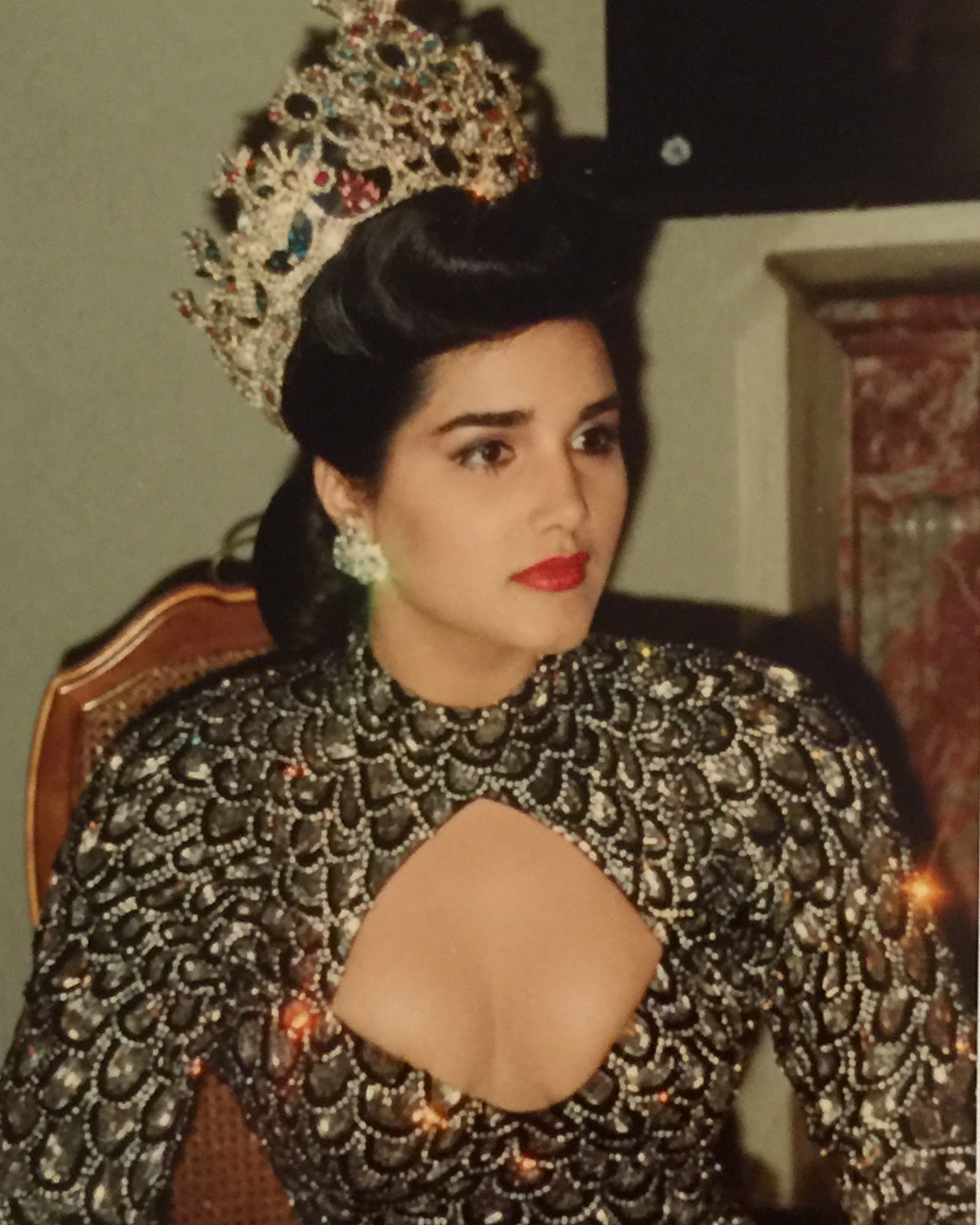
- Rosario Rodriguez
- Date: September 1, 1989
- Venue: Estudio A de Rahintel, Santo Domingo, Dominican Republic
- Broadcaster: Rahintel
- Entrants: 22
- Winner: Rosario del Carmen Rodríguez; Distrito Nacional

Miss República Dominicana 1990 was held on September 1, 1989. There were 22 candidates, representing provinces and municipalities, who entered. The winner would represent the Dominican Republic at Miss Universe 1990. The first runner up would enter Miss World 1990. The second runner up would enter in Miss International 1990. The rest of finalist entered different pageants.

== Results ==
Final results	Contestant
Miss República Dominicana 1990	Distrito Nacional Santo Domingo- Rosario Rodríguez
1st Runner-up	Distrito Nacional Santo Domingo- Brenda Marte
2nd Runner-up	Distrito Nacional Santo Domingo- Maria Isabel de Leon
3rd Runner-up	San francisco de macoris -Provincia Duarte - Cesarina del rosario
4th Runner-up	Santiago Keyla pena

== Contestants ==
Represented	Contestant	Age	Height	Hometown
Azua	Ana Karina Bettner Riosanchez	20	1.75	Santo Domingo
Distrito Nacional	Mayra Joli	24	1.80	Santo Domingo
Bonao	Eva Javielina Espinoza de Arollo	23	1.71	Concepción de la Vega
Constanza	Tatiana Rojas Pérez	21	1.76	Santo Domingo
Distrito Nacional	Rosario del Carmen Rodríguez	19	1.83	Santo Domingo
Duarte	Ada Catalina Fiallo Bennett	24	1.72	San Francisco de Macorís
Espaillat	Ama Evageline Cepeda Inoa	25	1.70	San Felipe de Puerto Plata
Isla Saona	Christina Salcedo Oviedo	19	1.71	Salvaleón de Higüey
Jimaní	July Margarita Ramírez de Arias	18	1.73	Santo Domingo
La Altagracia	María Altagracia Peña Vásquez	22	1.77	Salvaleón de Higüey
La Romana	Wilma Alicia Germán Castaño	18	1.74	Santiago de los Caballeros
La Vega	Nikauly de la Mota	23	1.78	Concepción de la Vega
Monte Cristi	Minerva Argentina Quirós Sosa	20	1.80	Santo Domingo
Pedernales	Brenda Carolina Marte Lajara	19	1.83	Santiago de los Caballeros
Puerto Plata	Vivian Aelin Calderón Sánchez	21	1.82	San Felipe de Puerto Plata
Samaná	Liona María Pigueras Fonseca	24	1.84	San Felipe de Puerto Plata
Sánchez Ramírez	Joneidys Viviana Ramírez Camacho	19	1.69	Santo Domingo
San Francisco de Macorís	Lorraine Ámbar Nova Espinal	24	1.70	San Francisco de Macorís
San Pedro de Macorís	Lizbeth del Isabel Santana Peralta	22	1.79	Santo Domingo
Santiago	María Isabel Leonidas de León Vargas	17	1.81	Santiago de los Caballeros
Santiago Rodríguez	Miriam Magdalena Cruz Tejeda	22	1.68	Santo Domingo
Valverde	Liliana Acosta Zamora	23	1.86	Santo Domingo
