= Miss Dominican Republic 1996 =

- Date: March 16, 1996
- Venue: Renaissance Auditorio de Festival del Hotel Jaragua, Santo Domingo, Dominican Republic
- Broadcaster: Telemicro
- Entrants: 23
- Winner: Sandra Abreu; La Romana

Miss Dominican Republic 1996 (Spanish: República Dominicana 1996) was held on December 16, 1995. There were 23 candidates, representing provinces and municipalities, who entered. The winner would represent the Dominican Republic at Miss Universe 1996 and Miss International 1996. The first runner up would enter Miss World 1996. The second runner up would enter in Reinado Internacional del Café 1996. The rest of finalist entered different pageants. The contest was one of the most scandalous ever, when jury and crowd started screaming “ Fraud” at the end of the night. Judges claim to have voted unanimously for crowd favorite, Anneliese Ortiz Mirabal from Salcedo. At a press conference days later, she surrender all titles won during the competition and was then named “ La Reina del Pueblo”, 'The Queen of the Town'.

== Results ==
Final results	Contestant
Miss Dominican Republic 1996	La Romana - Sandra Abreu
Miss Dominican World 1996	Azua - Idelsa Núñez
Miss Dominican International 1996	Salcedo - Anneliese Ortiz Mirabal
Miss Dominican Latin America	Bonao - Rosalía Lantigua
1st Finalist	Constanza- Nellys Durán
2nd Finalist	Las Matas de Farfán- Állison Veras
Semi-finalists	Puerto Plata - Melisa Guzmán; Santiago - Ada Colón; Vílla Mella - Carolina Peña; Baoruco - Maritza Ferreira; Villa Bisonó - Ana de Moya

== Delegates ==
Represented	Contestant	Age	Height	Hometown
Azua	Idelsa Núñez Torres	21	180 cm 5 ft 11 in	Santo Domingo
Baoruco	Maritza Ferreira Castellanos	19	172 cm 5 ft 8 in	Neiba
Bonao	Arelis Campusano Cepeda	20	178 cm 5 ft 10 in	Bonao
Constanza	Dora Nellys Durán Espinal	19	172 cm 5 ft 8 in	Concepción de La Vega
Distrito Nacional	Denny Andreina Méndez de la Rosa	17	178 cm 5 ft 10 in	Santo Domingo
El Seibo	Rocío Cobre Almador	24	182 cm 6 ft 0 in	Santo Domingo
Higüey	Manuela Lara Estevez	20	176 cm 5 ft 9 in	Salvaleón de Higüey
Jarabacoa	Casandra Sobrevillo Urtea	18	179 cm 5 ft 10 in	Jarabacoa
La Romana	Sandra Natasha Abreu Matusevicius	25	181 cm 5 ft 11 in	La Romana
La Vega	Jonoris Tavarez Monegro	23	174 cm 5 ft 9 in	Concepción de La Vega
Las Matas de Farfán	Allison Veras Cepeda	18	173 cm 5 ft 8 in	Santo Domingo
María Trinidad Sánchez	Alexis de Soto Matos	21	172 cm 5 ft 8 in	Santo Domingo
Monte Cristi	Milka Hidalgo Ferrano	23	177 cm 5 ft 10 in	Santo Domingo
Puerto Plata	Melisa Yudelka Guzmán Herrera	20	182 cm 6 ft 0 in	San Felipe de Puerto Plata
San Cristóbal	Melina de los Santos Torrealba	19	176 cm 5 ft 9 in	San Cristóbal
San Pedro de Macorís	Altagracia Vargas Rosado	20	173 cm 5 ft 8 in	Santo Domingo
Santiago	Ada María Colón Rosario	18	180 cm 5 ft 11 in	Santiago de los Caballeros
Tamboril	Yanilka Abreu Romero	21	183 cm 6 ft 0 in	Santiago de los Caballeros
Valverde	Belkis Quirós del Valle	19	186 cm 6 ft 1 in	Santa Cruz de Mao
Villa Bisonó	Ana Lucía de Moya Peralta	22	176 cm 5 ft 9 in	Santiago de los Caballeros
Villa González	Aura Margarita Reyes Polanco	23	179 cm 5 ft 10 in	Santiago de los Caballeros
Salcedo	Anneliese Ortíz Mirabal	18	185 cm 6 ft 1 in	Salcedo
Vílla Mella	Carolina Peña Ureña	22	172 cm 5 ft 8 in	Santo Domingo
