= Miss Mundo Dominicana 2008 =

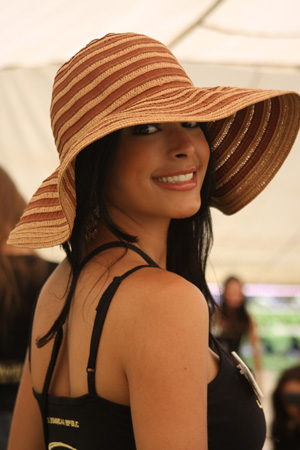
- Geisha Montes in Miss World 2008
- Date: July 27, 2008
- Venue: Antena TV, Santo Domingo, Dominican Republic
- Broadcaster: Canal 11
- Entrants: 16
- Winner: Geisha Natalie Montes; Distrito Nacional

The Miss Mundo Dominicana 2008 pageant was held on July 27, 2008. This year only 16 candidates were competing for the national crown. The chosen winner will represent the Dominican Republic at the Miss World 2008. The first runner up will represent the Dominican Republic in Miss America Latina 2009. Its national director, Belkys Reyes is a "Miss trainer" who has prepared models like Amelia Vega.

== Results ==
- Miss Mundo Dominicana 2008: Geisha Natalie Montes de Oca Robles (Distrito Nacional)
- 1st Runner Up: Rosaura Almánzar (Puerto Plata)
- 2nd Runner Up: Cinthia Bengacomo (Com. Dom. Nueva York)

Top 6

- Magdalena Batista (Santiago)
- Laura Bedmigton (Com. Dom. Canada)
- Erica Moros (La Romana)

Top 10

- Maite Cargoa (Com. Dom. Miami)
- Cristina Peña (La Vega)
- Sofy Arcenegas (Com. Dom. Lto. America)
- Erica Peralta (Santo Domingo)

=== Special awards ===
- Miss Photogenic (voted by press reporters) - Sofy Arcenegas (Com. Dom. Lto. America)
- Miss Congeniality (voted by contestants) - Sandra Batista (Santiago)
- Best Face - Geisha Montes (Distrito Nacional)
- Best Provincial Costume - Joana Reynosa (Espaillat)
- Miss Talent - Rosaura Almánzar (Puerto Plata)
- Miss Top Model - Sofy Arcenegas (Com. Dom. Lto. America)

== Miss Dominican Regions ==
- Miss Region del Cibao: Rosaura Almánzar (Puerto Plata)
- Miss Region en el Exterior: Cinthia Bengacomo (Com. Dom. Nueva York)
- Miss Region del Sur: Geisha Montes (Distrito Nacional)

== Delegates ==
| Province, Community | Contestant | Age | Height | Hometown | Geographical Regions |
|---|---|---|---|---|---|
| Azua | Eliza Ferre Reyno | 25 | 165 cm 5 ft 5 in | Azua de Compostela | Sur |
| Baoruco | Sandy Ovea Guerra | 19 | 180 cm 5 ft 11 in | Santo Domingo | Sur |
| Barahona | Carolina Alce Latena | 21 | 172 cm 5 ft 8 in | Santo Domingo | Sur |
| Com. Dom. Canada | Laura Minerva Bedmigton Suarez | 18 | 170 cm 5 ft 7 in | Toronto | Exterior |
| Com. Dom. Lto. America | Sofy Arcenegas Montalvo | 23 | 177 cm 5 ft 10 in | Las Palmas de Gran Canaria | Exterior |
| Com. Dom. Miami | Maite Cargoa Lopez | 26 | 167 cm 5 ft 6 in | Miami | Exterior |
| Com. Dom. Nueva York | Cinthia Marlene Bengacomo Suarez | 20 | 181 cm 5 ft 11 in | Long Island | Exterior |
| Distrito Nacional | Geisha Natalie Montes de Oca Robles | 21 | 175 cm 5 ft 9 in | Santo Domingo Este | Sur |
| Duarte | Cindy Zamora Alva | 21 | 183 cm 6 ft 0 in | Santo Domingo | El Cibao |
| Espaillat | Joana Reynosa Abreu | 18 | 170 cm 5 ft 7 in | Moca | El Cibao |
| La Romana | Erica Joan Moros Xavier | 21 | 179 cm 5 ft 10 in | La Romana | Sur |
| La Vega | Cristina Peña Garzon | 20 | 169 cm 5 ft 7 in | Santiago de los Caballeros | El Cibao |
| Puerto Plata | Rosaura Almánzar de Lara | 18 | 180 cm 5 ft 11 in | Sosúa | El Cibao |
| Santiago | Sandra Magdalena Batista Ruiz | 22 | 174 cm 5 ft 9 in | Santiago de los Caballeros | El Cibao |
| Santo Domingo | Erica Marinela Peralta Oviedo | 19 | 170 cm 5 ft 7 in | Santo Domingo | Sur |
| Valverde | Patricia Duarte Ramones | 24 | 167 cm 5 ft 6 in | Santiago de los Caballeros | El Cibao |
