= Miss Dominican Republic 1973 =

- Date: January 29, 1973
- Venue: Auditorio del Bueno Café del Hotel Lina, Santo Domingo, Dominican Republic
- Broadcaster: Color Vision
- Entrants: 28
- Winner: Liliana Maritza Fernández González; Salcedo

Señorita República Dominicana 1973 was held on January 29, 1973. This is a national beauty pageant held in the Dominican Republic. There were 28 candidates who competed for the national crown. The winner represented the Dominican Republic at the Miss Universe 1973. The Virreina al Miss Mundo entered Miss World 1973. Only 27 provinces and 1 municipality entered. The top 10 contestants paraded in evening gowns and answered questions to select the top five, who then answered more questions.

== Results ==
- Señorita República Dominicana 1973 : Liliana Maritza Fernández González (Salcedo)
- Virreina al Miss Mundo : Clariza Ana Duarte Garrido (Puerto Plata)
- 1st Runner Up : Nidez Veras (Espaillat)
- 2nd Runner Up : Ana Hidalgo (Barahona)
- 3rd Runner Up : Rita Hernández (Distrito Nacional)

Top 10

- Julia Wilton (Santiago)
- Silvana Rodríguez (Santo Domingo de Guzmán)
- Rocio Vargas (Valverde)
- Wilma Suarez (La Vega)
- Ynes Delgado (Azua)

=== Special awards ===
- Miss Rostro Bello – Silvana Rodríguez (Puerto Plata)
- Miss Photogenic (voted by press reporters) - Erica Taxción (Séibo)
- Miss Congeniality (voted by Miss Dominican Republic Universe contestants) - Yolanda Romero (Peravia)
- Best Provincial Costume - María Ruiz (Samaná)

== Delegates ==
- Azua - María Ynes Delgado Coruña
- Baoruco - Ana Carina Frustrado Duarte
- Barahona - Ana María Hidalgo Peña
- Dajabón - Linda Viviana Sánchez Brito
- Distrito Nacional - Rita Carmen Hernández de las Palmas
- Duarte - Sarah Ceneyda del Rosario Cruz
- Espaillat - Nidez Magdalena Veras Duarte
- Independencia - Janet Ann Luzio Peralta
- La Altagracia - Aida Magia del Rey Tavarez
- La Estrelleta - Gladys Zamia Colón Reyes
- La Romana - Vanessa María Díaz Lovo
- La Vega - Magdalena Wilma Suarez Cristiano
- María Trinidad Sánchez - Eugenia Xiomara Ramírez Caba
- Monte Cristi - Fernanda Germania de Cristo Valle
- Pedernales - María José Ocoa Espinal
- Peravia - Yolanda Carina Romero Castro
- Puerto Plata - Clariza Ana Duarte Garrido
- Salcedo - Liliana Maritza Fernández González
- Samaná - María Jesus Ruiz Castaño
- Sánchez Ramírez - Eva Miranda Mérida Sosa
- San Cristóbal - Ana Jiomara Taitis Hello
- San Juan de la Maguana - Medrina Anes Maldonado Ruz
- San Pedro - Ana María Sosa Sosa
- Santiago - Julia Margarita Wilton de los Rosarios
- Santiago Rodríguez - María Lucia García Rosario
- Séibo - Erica Mariana Taxción Olivio
- Santo Domingo de Guzmán - Silvana Teresa Rodríguez de los Víllas
- Valverde - Rocio Fernanda Vargas Lozano
