= Miss RD Internacional 2012 =

- Date: June 27, 2012
- Venue: Punta Cana, Dominican Republic
- Entrants: 1
- Winner: Melody Mir Jiménez; Santiago

The Miss RD Internacional 2012 was hand-picked by the Organization of Miss International Dominican Republic and the franchiser responsible to send a Dominican representative to the Miss International 2012 beauty pageant. The Miss RD Internacional 2012 pageant was postponed due to lack of money and sponsors. Instead they hand-picked the Miss Spain 2009 semifinalist of Dominican origins, Melody Mir Jiménez from Santiago de los Caballeros, Santiago. Reina Nacional de Belleza 2012 will be held in October 2012 and then will send the winner to Miss World 2013, Miss International 2013, Miss Supranational 2013. The Miss RD Internacional 2012 is 21 years old and has a height of 5 feet 10 inches. Melody is a current student Universidad Iberoamericana (UNIBE) majoring in medicine. She was born in Santiago de los Caballeros but raised in Palmas de Mallorca, Spain. She participated in Reina Hispanoamericana 2009 representing Spain.

Melody Mir Jimenez, Spanish father and Dominican mother, born in Santo Domingo (Dominican Republic). In 2008, at the age of only 18 years, she became Miss Islas Baleares; later she participated in Miss Spain 2009 and became a finalist and was selected to represent the country in an international competition held in October 2009 as Reina Hispanoamericana 2009 and had won second runner-up (equivalent to fourth position). Currently, she is finishing her tourism studies and works as a model. She can speak and has some knowledge of a variety of different languages. On July 4 she was hand-picked to be Miss Dominican Republic International 2012"for the Miss International 2012 that would be held in Okinawa on October 21.
