= Miss Dominican Republic 1972 =

- Date: March 1, 1972
- Venue: Auditorio del Bueno Café del Hotel Lina, Santo Domingo, Dominican Republic
- Broadcaster: Color Vision
- Entrants: 28
- Winner: Ivonne Lucia Butler de los Montellanos; Barahona

Señorita República Dominicana 1972 was held on March 1, 1972. There were 28 candidates who competed for the national crown. The winner represented the Dominican Republic at the Miss Universe 1972. The Virreina al Miss Mundo will enter Miss World 1972. Only the 27 province, 1 municipality entered. On the top 10 they showed their evening gown and answered questions so they could go to the top 5. In the top 5 they would answer more questions.

== Results ==
- Señorita República Dominicana 1972: Ivonne Lucia Butler de los Montellanos (Barahona)
- Virreina al Miss Mundo: Teresa Evangelina Medrano Espaillat (Puerto Plata)
- 1st Runner Up: Sandra Pineda (Santiago)
- 2nd Runner Up: Lucia Castro (Duarte)
- 3rd Runner Up: Eva Toledo (Santo Domingo de Guzmán)

=== Top 10 ===
- Lisbeth Ynoa (Salcedo)
- Gina Rioz (Santiago Rodríguez)
- Etna Sainz (Azua)
- Laila González (San Pedro)
- Eva Marte (Samaná)

=== Special awards ===
- Miss Rostro Bello – Amparo Lucres (La Romana)
- Miss Photogenic (voted by press reporters) - Diana Suarez (Séibo)
- Miss Congeniality (voted by Miss Dominican Republic Universe contestants) - Ana Batista (San Juan de la Maguana)
- Best Provincial Costume - Lila Ocoa (San Cristóbal)

== Delegates ==
- Azua - Etna María Sainz Costa
- Baoruco - María Valentina Burlington Abreu
- Barahona - Ivonne Lucia Butler de los Montellanos
- Dajabón - María Antonieta de la Cruz Tias
- Distrito Nacional - Estefania Digna de Ferrer Zamor
- Duarte - Lucia Reyna Castro Martínez
- Espaillat - Adriana Martha Windsrow Milos
- Independencia - Miledys Katalina Alvarado Coñado
- La Altagracia - Germanialedys Ana Ferreira Oviedo
- La Estrelleta - Katia Mary Trujillo Meran
- La Romana - Amparo Zamina Lucres Luna
- La Vega - Amelia Victoria Rodríguez Vargas
- María Trinidad Sánchez - María Eugenia Cadus Tarragona
- Monte Cristi - María Caridad Ramírez Sánchez
- Pedernales - Ana Iris Duarte Valle
- Peravia - Martha Agnes Farfán Juanes
- Puerto Plata - Teresa Evangelina Medrano Espaillat
- Salcedo - Lisbeth Tatia Ynoa Ureña
- Samaná - Eva María Marte Rosario
- Sánchez Ramírez - Helga Karina Muñoz Sosa
- San Cristóbal - Lila Iliana Ocoa Soriano
- San Juan de la Maguana - Ana Eugenia Batista Roth
- San Pedro - Ana Laila González Roman
- Santiago - Sandra Magdalena Pineda de los Duartes
- Santiago Rodríguez - Mary Gina Rioz Espinoza
- Séibo - Diana Mary Suarez Suarez
- Santo Domingo de Guzmán - Eva Arelis Toledo Arevalos
- Valverde - Isabel Magdalena Monroig Ramos
