= Miss Dominican Republic 1993 =

- Date: July 28, 1992
- Venue: Jaragua Hotel y Casino, Santo Domingo, Dominican Republic
- Broadcaster: Telemicro
- Entrants: 26
- Winner: Odalisse Margarita Rodríguez González; Distrito Nacional

Miss República Dominicana 1993 was a beauty contest held on July 28, 1992, in the Dominican Republic; the winner would represent the Dominican Republic at Miss Universe 1993. The first runner up would enter Miss World 1993. The second runner up would enter in Reina Mundial del Banano 1993. 26 candidates representing provinces and municipalities entered. The rest of the finalists entered different pageants.

== Results ==
Final results	Contestant
Miss República Dominicana 1993	Distrito Nacional - Odalisse (Oddy) Rodríguez
1st Runner-up	La Vega - Lynn Álvarez
2nd Runner-up	Sánchez Ramírez - Lucy Vásquez
3rd Runner-up	Dajabón - Sandra Peralta
4th Runner-up	Neiba - Anferny Escobar
5th Runner-up	Vílla Mella - Ludwicka Espinal
Semi-finalists	Santiago - Judith Burgos; Jarabacoa - Lidwina Gracia; Comendador - Luz Ferreira; Puerto Plata - Isaura Roman; Barahona - Iuliza Taveras; Los Alcarrizos - Eugenia Mateo

== Delegates ==
Represented	Contestant	Age	Height	Hometown
Azua	Waleksa de Vargas Soriano	19	180 cm 5 ft 11 in	Azua de Compostela
Barahona	Iuliza Catiala Taveras de Arias	21	177 cm 5 ft 10 in	Santo Domingo
Boca Chica	Lorraine Caba de Jesús	20	168 cm 5 ft 6 in	Santo Domingo
Comendador	Luz Margarita Ferreira Espinoza	18	175 cm 5 ft 9 in	Santo Domingo
Dajabón	Sandra Jorabel Peralta Vargas	20	181 cm 5 ft 11 in	Dajabón
Distrito Nacional	Odalisse Margarita (Oddy) Rodríguez González	17	177 cm 5 ft 10 in	Santo Domingo
El Seibo	Eva Altagracia Jiménez Camacho	23	179 cm 5 ft 10 in	Santo Domingo
Hato Mayor	Alba Elizandra Velásquez Arroyo	25	169 cm 5 ft 7 in	Santo Domingo
Jarabacoa	Lidwina Carolina Gracia Tejada	24	166 cm 5 ft 5 in	Jarabacoa
Jimaní	Gladys Carolina Peña Merán	21	171 cm 5 ft 7 in	Santo Domingo
La Altagracia	Joana Lacienega de Lara Rojas	18	174 cm 5 ft 9 in	Punta Cana
La Romana	Margie Tavarez de Sousa	19	178 cm 5 ft 10 in	La Romana
La Vega	Lynnedys Marie Álvarez Klinken	18	176 cm 5 ft 9 in	Concepción de La Vega
Los Alcarrizos	Eugenia Mateo Aybar	24	176 cm 5 ft 9 in	Santo Domingo
Moca	Silvia Mary Aquino Herrero	22	172 cm 5 ft 8 in	Moca
Monseñor Nouel	Enita del Carmen Alcántara Polanco	19	183 cm 6 ft 0 in	Bonao
Monte Cristi	Sandra Maleny Quirós Paulino	19	170 cm 5 ft 7 in	San Fdo. de Monte Cristi
Monte Plata	Milagros de la Cruz Ferro	23	173 cm 5 ft 8 in	Santo Domingo
Neiba	Anferny Escobar Reyes	17	174 cm 5 ft 9 in	Neiba
Puerto Plata	Isaura Mariela Roman Sued	19	182 cm 6 ft 0 in	Maimón
Sánchez Ramírez	Lucy Altagracia Vásquez Almonte	18	178 cm 5 ft 10 in	Cotuí
San Francisco de Macorís	Carmen Risory Zamora Oviedo	20	176 cm 5 ft 9 in	San Francisco de Macorís
San José de las Matas	Margarita María Báez Sánchez	23	173 cm 5 ft 8 in	Santiago de los Caballeros
Santiago	Judith Esther Burgos Ramírez	20	179 cm 5 ft 10 in	Santiago de los Caballeros
Tamboril	Janiledys Martínez Pacheco	19	170 cm 5 ft 7 in	Santiago de los Caballeros
Vílla Mella	Ludwicka Katarzyna Espinal Polawesky	17	171 cm 5 ft 7 in	Santo Domingo
