= Miss Dominican Republic 1987 =

- Date: December 10, 1986
- Venue: Centro Español Santiago de los Caballeros, Dominican Republic
- Broadcaster: Rahintel
- Entrants: 19
- Winner: Carmen Rita Pérez Pellerano; Santiago

Concurso Nacional de Belleza 1987 was held on December 10, 1986. There were 28 candidates who competed for the national crown. The winner represented the Dominican Republic at Miss Universe 1987. The Señorita República Dominicana Mundo entered Miss World 1987. The Señorita República Dominicana Café entered Reinado Internacional del Café 1987. Only the 19 delegates participated representing the National District and provinces. The pageant was held for the first time in Santiago de los Caballeros at the Centro Español. The top 10 they showed their evening gowns and answered questions to go to the top 5. In the top 5 they answered more questions.

== Results ==
Final results	Contestant
Señorita República Dominicana 1987	Santiago - Carmen Pérez
Señorita República Dominicana Mundo	Salcedo - Paula Lora
Señorita República Dominicana Café	Distrito Nacional - Jacqueline Soñé
1st Runner Up	Pedernales - Isaura Ramírez
2nd Runner Up	María Trinidad Sánchez - Maritza Cabrera
Semi-finalists	Distrito Nacional - Rosanna Diep; Azua - Suany Arias; Santiago Rodríguez - Rocío Battle; Dajabón - Patricia Peralta; Elías Piña - Miguelina Hermoso

== Delegates ==
- Azua - Suany Arias
- Dajabón - Patricia Peralta
- Distrito Nacional - Natacha Acevedo
- Distrito Nacional - Marisol Polanco
- Distrito Nacional - Noris Briones Castillo
- Distrito Nacional - Jacqueline Soñé Alfonseca
- Distrito Nacional - Rosanna Diep
- Distrito Nacional - Luisa Esther Cruz
- Distrito Nacional - Lesdia Noemí Acosta Jiménez
- Distrito Nacional - Miguelina Ruiz
- Elías Piña - Miguelina Hermoso
- María Trinidad Sánchez - Maritza Cabrera
- Pedernales - Isaura Ramírez
- Puerto Plata - Martha de la Mota
- Salcedo - Paula del Carmen Lora García
- Santiago - Magaly Capellán
- Santiago - Carmen Rita Pérez Pellerano
- Santiago - Rocío Battle
- Valverde - Mariledys Acosta
