= Miss Dominican Republic 1977 =

- Venue: Secretaria de Estado de Turismo, Santo Domingo, Dominican Republic
- Winner: Blanca Aurora Sardiña; Puerto Plata

Señorita República Dominicana 1977. There was no pageant or competition in this edition. Miss Dominican Republic 1977 was an administrative designation by The Dominican Tourist Office. Blanca Aurora Sardiñas was appointed to represent the country at the Miss Universe 1977 which was held at the National Theater in Santo Domingo Dominican Republic.
