= Miss Dominican Republic 1962 =

National beauty pageant

- Date: January 29, 1962
- Venue: La Concha Acústica del Hotel Embajador, Santo Domingo, Dominican Republic
- Broadcaster: Color Vision
- Entrants: 26
- Debuts: Ciudad Santo Domingo, Jimaní, Sánchez Ramírez
- Winner: Sarah Olimpia Frómeta Pou; Santo Domingo

Señorita República Dominicana 1962 was held on January 29, 1962, when 26 candidates competed for the national crown. The winner represented the Dominican Republic at the Miss Universe 1962 . The first runner up would enter Miss International 1962. Only the 25 provinces and 1 municipality entered. The top ten contestants wore evening gowns and answered questions to get through to the top 5, where they answered more questions.

== Results ==
- Señorita República Dominicana 1962 : Sarah Olimpia Frómeta Pou) Santo Domingo
- 1st Runner Up : Milagros García (Santiago Rodríguez)
- 2nd Runner Up : Caty Zamora (Peravia)
- 3rd Runner Up : Iris Tavarez (San Juan de la Maguana)
- 4th Runner Up : Fernánda Gómez (Pedernales)

Top 10

- Carina Santana (Santiago)
- Clarisa Germán (Jimaní)
- Luz del Ara (Valverde)
- Gina Rosal (Distrito Nacional)
- Mireya Meran (San Rafael)

=== Special awards ===
- Miss Rostro Bello - Clarisa Germán (Jimaní)
- Miss Photogenic (voted by press reporters) - Iris Tavarez (San Juan de la Maguana)
- Miss Congeniality (voted by Miss Dominican Republic Universe contestants) - Sarah Frómeta (Santo Domingo, Dominican Republic)

== Delegates ==
- Azua - Lize Germania Oman Garzon
- Baoruco - Mean Fausta Peralta Peralta
- Barahona - Fausta Reina Aroyo Tatis
- Ciudad Santo Domingo - Eliza Desi Abreu Olis
- Dajabón - Teodora Mary Ureña Panis
- Distrito Nacional - Gina Marianela Rosal Duarte
- Duarte - Altagracia Teresita Lara Eros
- Espaillat - Miledis Margarita Reyes Roid
- Jimaní - Clarisa Laura Germán Peralta
- La Altagracia - Margarita Rojas Rosario
- La Vega - Ana Lissette Ferro Ynoa
- Monte Cristi - Carmen Isabel Fermin Garca
- Pedernales - Fernánda Carlixta Gómez Valle
- Peravia - Catherine Alexis Zamora Camu
- Santo Domingo, Dominican Republic - Sarah Olimpia Frómeta de Schad
- Salcedo - María Teresa Solís Colmenares
- Samaná - Julisa de Reina Asturias Indriago
- Sánchez Ramírez - Denise Carmela Alavrez Voyd
- San Cristóbal - Milly Carina Reyes Vegas
- San Juan de la Maguana - Iris Ceneyda Tavarez Matos
- San Pedro - Ynes Daina Vargas Garoid
- San Rafael - Mireya Marelne Meran Martínez
- Santiago - Carina Valentina Santana Cabrera
- Santiago Rodríguez - Milagros del Carmen García Duval
- Séibo - Ana Lucia Lara Tenerife
- Valverde - Luz Clarita del Ara Polanco
