= Miss Dominican Republic 1967 =

- Date: January 29, 1967
- Venue: La Concha Acústica del Hotel Embajador, Santo Domingo, Dominican Republic
- Broadcaster: Color Vision
- Entrants: 24
- Debuts: Baoruco, Barahona, and Nueva Era (as the provincial Region of Delta Neiba)
- Winner: Jeanette Morena Rey García; Duarte

Señorita República Dominicana 1967 was held on January 29, 1967. There were 24 candidates who competed for the national crown. The winner represented the Dominican Republic at the Miss Universe 1967. The Virreina al Miss Mundo will enter Miss World 1967. The Virreina al Miss Internacional will enter Miss International 1967. Only the 25 province, 1 municipality entered. On the top 10 they showed their evening gown and answered questions so they could go to the top 5. In the top 5 they would answer more questions.

== Results ==
- Señorita República Dominicana 1967 : Jeanette Morena Rey García (Duarte)
- Virreina al Miss Mundo : Margarita Rosa Rueckschnat Schott (Distrito Nacional)
- Virreina al Miss Internacional : Vivien Susana Estrella Cevallos (Santiago)
- 1st Runner Up : Margarita Cury (Delta Neiba)
- 2nd Runner Up : Maira Fortunato (Puerto Plata)

Top 10

- Lori Rey (La Vega)
- Ana Araujo (Dajabón)
- Milka Maldonado (Sánchez Ramírez)
- Martha Antonio (Monte Cristi)
- Teresita Acta (Espaillat)

=== Special awards ===
- Miss Rostro Bello – Lori Rey (La Vega)
- Miss Photogenic (voted by press reporters) - Sarah Reunaux-Flemaux (La Altagracia)
- Miss Congeniality (voted by Miss Dominican Republic Universe contestants) - Aida Roman (Valverde)

== Delegates ==
- Azua - Lourdes Evangelina Santiago Cardona
- Ciudad Santo Domingo - Milagros Carola Mir Polanco
- Dajabón - Ana Dilia Araujo López
- Delta Neiba - Margarita Karina Cury Vásquez
- Distrito Nacional - Margarita Rosa Rueckschnat Schott
- Duarte - Jeanette Morena Rey García
- Espaillat - Teresita Lucía Acta Peralta
- La Altagracia - Sarah Elisa Reunaux-Flemaux Rivera
- La Estrelleta - Angelita María Bodden Tejada
- La Vega - Lori Magali Rey Garcia
- Monte Cristi - Martha Rosina Antonio Felíz
- Pedernales - Argelina Lourel Nefer Medina
- Peravia - María Catarina del Rosario Díaz
- Puerto Plata - Maira Zeneida Fortunato de los Reyes
- Salcedo - Vivien Estrella Moore Petrés
- Samaná - Ana Catalina Pulajs Nolasco
- Sánchez Ramírez - Milka Susana Maldonado Arias
- San Cristóbal - Gladys María Cruz Pichardo
- San Juan de la Maguana - Ana Josefa Puello Báez
- San Pedro - Gladis Josefina Villeta Cisneros
- Santiago - Vivien Susana Estrella Cevallos
- Santiago Rodríguez - Rosa Ivelisse Cacahuate Francisco
- Séibo - Altagracia Inés Abel de la Rosa
- Valverde - Aida Maritza Roman Quiros
