= Miss Dominican Republic 1956 =

- Date: January 29, 1956
- Venue: Santo Domingo, Dominican Republic
- Entrants: 24
- Debuts: Beata, Provincia de Jarabacoa
- Winner: Olga Fernánda Fiallo Oliva de los Rosario; Distrito de Santo Domingo

Señorita República Dominicana 1956 was held on January 29, 1956. There were 24 candidates who competed for the national crown. The winner represented the Dominican Republic at the Miss Universe 1956. On the top 10 they showed their evening gown so they could go to the top 5. In the top 5 they would answer more questions. This edition would send their first delegate to Miss Universe.

== Results ==
- Señorita República Dominicana 1956 : Olga Fernánda Fiallo Oliva de los Rosario (Distrito de Santo Domingo)
- 1st Runner Up : Alexandra Ferro (Colón)
- 2nd Runner Up : Isaura de Palmera (Beata)
- 3rd Runner Up : Sara Abreu (Puerto Plata)
- 4th Runner Up : Carmen Castro (Provincia de Jarabacoa)

Top 10

- Tatiana Zamora (Santiago)
- María Taveras (Trujillo)
- Concepción Veras (Duarte)
- Altagracia Oviedo (Salcedo)
- Laura Silvestre (Samaná)

== Delegates ==
- Azua - Germania Angie Alvarez Rosa
- Baoruco - Angelica Sandra Zamiera Sosa
- Barahona - Anjelika Eduarda Fermin Tavarez
- Beata - Isuara Joana de Palmera Ruiz
- Benefactor - Tatiana Germania Quiros Valle
- Colón - Alexandra Margarita Ferro Rodríguez
- Distrito de Santo Domingo - Olga Fernánda Fiallo Oliva de los Rosario
- Duarte - Concepción de Ursula Veras Castañeda
- Espaillat - Ana Josefina Horlanda Peralta
- José Trujillo Valdez - Ana Cassandra Eros Fausto
- La Altagracia - Remedios Veronica de Rojas Melilla
- La Vega - Arelis del Carmen Mena Cabrera
- Libertador - Mary Lionas Peña Arias
- Monte Cristi - María Teresa Martínez Derios
- Provincia de Jarabacoa - Carmen de Dolores Castro de Zaragoza
- Puerto Plata - Sara Magdalena de Dolores Abreu Suarez
- Salcedo - Altagracia Leonida Oviedo Peralta
- Samaná - Laura Carina Silvestre Adames
- San Pedro de Macorís - María Eugenia Reynosa Reys
- San Rafael - Elizabeth del Carmen Espinal Hidalgo
- Santiago - Tatiana Ceneyda Zamora Vargas
- Santiago Rodríguez - María Angelica Ferrano Urtoda
- Séibo - Isabela Rosa Guerrero Meran
- Trujillo - María Casilda Taveras Collado

== Trivia ==
- Alexandra Ferro was one of the first people to be born from the Island of Catalina. She was also the tallest measuring 6 ft 3 in or 190 cm. Her parents and her family comes from La Romana.
