= Miss Universe Dominicana 2001 =

- Date: April 9, 2001
- Venue: Renaissance Auditorio de Festival del Hotel Jaragua, Santo Domingo, Dominican Republic
- Broadcaster: Color Vision
- Entrants: 26
- Debuts: Com. Dom. en Puerto Rico
- Winner: Claudia Cristiana Cruz de los Santos; San Juan

Miss Universe Dominicana 2001 was held on April 9, 2001. There were 26 candidates, representing provinces and municipalities, who entered. The winner would represent the Dominican Republic at Miss Universe 2001 and Miss América Latina 2002. The Miss Mundo Dominicana would enter Miss World 2001. The first runner up would enter in Miss Atlántico Internacional 2002. The second runner up would enter in Reinado Internacional del Café 2001. The third runner up would enter in Miss Intercontinental 2001. The rest of finalist entered different pageants. 16 Provinces, 8 Municipalities and 2 Dominican Communities had entered.

== Results ==
Final results	Contestant
Miss Universe Dominicana 2001	San Juan - Claudia de los Santos
Miss Mundo Dominicana	Bonao - Jeimy Castíllo
1st Runner-Up	Puerto Plata - Michelle Alix Peralta
2nd Runner-Up	Salcedo - Yesenia Rosario
3rd Runner-Up	La Vega - Flor Curet
Semi-Finalists	Distrito Nacional - Merfry Then; Valverde Mao - Michelle Peralta; Santiago - Carmen Dionicio; San Francisco de Macorís - Jessica Mendez; Com. Dom. en Puerto Rico - Margie Tavarez; Santo Domingo Norte - Alexis Medina; El Seibo - Pati Oviedo

== Delegates ==
Represented	Contestant	Age	Height	Hometown
Azua	Cristina Sánchez Cordobar	19	1.75 m (5 ft 9 in)	Azua de Compostela
Baní	Maryann Tejeda Moncada	21	1.70 m (5 ft 7 in)	Baní
Bonao	Jeimy Castíllo Molina	23	1.68 m (5 ft 6 1/4 in)	Santo Domingo
Com. Dom. en Nueva Jersey	Elizabeth Espinal Veras	25	1.80 m (5 ft 10 3/4 in)	Newark
Com. Dom. Puerto Rico	Margie Tavarez Henríquez	26	1.75 m (5 ft 9 in)	Ponce
Distrito Nacional	Merfry Mercedes Then Rijo	24	1.80 m (5 ft 10 3/4 in)	Santo Domingo
Duarte	Carolina Martínez Rojas	20	1.74 m (5 ft 8 1/2 in)	San Francisco de Macorís
El Seibo	Natalia DeLaCruz	18	1.83 m (6 ft 0 in)	Santa Cruz de El Seibo
La Altagracia	Soraya Tavares Rivera	24	1.79 m (5 ft 10 1/2 in)	Sosúa
La Romana	Aura Jonelys García Mena	19	1.67 m (5 ft 5 3/4 in)	Santiago de los Caballeros
La Vega	Flor Patricia Curet Veras	18	1.73 m (5 ft 8 in)	Santo Domingo
Moca	Maite Alvarez Paulino	18	1.71 m (5 ft 7 1/4 in)	Moca
Monte Plata	Karina Torres Brito	24	1.66 m (5 ft 5 1/4 in)	Santo Domingo
Neiba	Susan Jimenoa Gómez	25	1.76 m (5 ft 9 1/4 in)	Santo Domingo
Pedernales	Jodalys Collado Pimentel	18	1.82 m (5 ft 11 3/4 in)	Santiago de los Caballeros
Puerto Plata	Michelle ALix P .	20	1.74 m (5 ft 8 1/2 in)	San Felipe de Puerto Plata
Salcedo	Yesenia Rosario Mota	21	1.78 m (5 ft 10 in)	Salcedo
Sánchez Ramírez	Elisa Arias Bernandino	22	1.78 m (5 ft 10 in)	Santo Domingo
San Francisco de Macorís	Jessica Mendez	21	1.72 m (5 ft 7 3/4 in)	San Francisco de Macorís
San Juan	Claudia Cristiana Cruz de los Santos	18	1.81 m (5 ft 11 1/4 in)	San Juan de la Maguana
San Pedro de Macorís	Erica Rodríguez Andrade	20	1.86 m (6 ft 1 1/4 in)	Santo Domingo
Santiago	Carmen Rosa Dionicio de las Palmas	26	1.80 m (5 ft 10 3/4 in)	Santiago de los Caballeros
Santiago Rodríguez	Altagracia Rosario Quirós	20	1.70 m (5 ft 7 in)	Villa de los Almácigos
Santo Domingo Norte	Alexis Medina Espinoza	18	1.74 m (5 ft 8 1/2 in)	Villa Mella
Santo Domingo Oeste	Sonia Sinayda Inoa Alvarado	25	1.77 m (5 ft 9 3/4 in)	Santo Domingo
Valverde Mao	Michelle Peralta Vargas	21	1.70 m (5 ft 7 in)	Santo Domingo
