= Miss Dominican Republic 1968 =

- Date: January 24, 1968
- Venue: La Concha Acústica del Hotel Embajador, Santo Domingo, Dominican Republic
- Broadcaster: Color Vision
- Entrants: 24
- Winner: Ana María Ortíz Mendoza; Puerto Plata

Señorita República Dominicana 1968 was held on January 24, 1968. There were 24 candidates who competed for the national crown. The winner represented the Dominican Republic at the Miss Universe 1968. The Virreina al Miss Mundo entered Miss World 1968. Only 25 provinces and one municipality entered. The top 10 wore their evening gowns and answered questions so they could go to the top from which five were selected.

== Results ==
- Señorita República Dominicana 1968: Ana María Ortíz Mendoza (Puerto Plata)
- Virreina al Miss Mundo: Ingrid Marie García de Cano (Duarte)
- 1st Runner Up: Ursula German (Santiago)
- 2nd Runner Up: Elizabeth Suarez (Distrito Nacional)
- 3rd Runner Up: Yolanda Ureña (Samaná)

Top 10

- Nicol Reynoso (Monte Cristi)
- Martha González (San Pedro)
- Gina Varbaros (Valverde)
- Luiza Taveras (Santiago Rodríguez)
- Milka Juanes (Séibo)

=== Special awards ===
- Miss Rostro Bello – Ursula German (Santiago)
- Miss Photogenic (voted by press reporters) – Nidez Arias (San Juan de la Maguana)
- Miss Congeniality (voted by Miss Dominican Republic Universe contestants) – Eva Padron (San Cristóbal)

== Delegates ==
- Azua – Margarita Ceasrina Duarte Toledo
- Ciudad Santo Domingo – María Alejandrina Ramírez Cruz
- Dajabón – Isabel Estefania de la Cruz Agujeros
- Delta Neiba – Katherine Yanet Ynoa Alvarado
- Distrito Nacional – Elizabeth Rolanda Suarez Soriano
- Duarte – Ingrid Marie García de Cano
- Espaillat – Esther Deis Díaz Pedros
- La Altagracia – Tatiana Katalina Bienvenido Loano
- La Estrelleta – María Teresa Alvarado Alvares
- La Vega – Mary Alba Rodríguez Brito
- Monte Cristi – Nicol Vivian Reynoso Santuario
- Pedernales – Estefania Alejandra Cruz Martínez
- Peravia – Laura Agynes Hidalgo Pineda
- Puerto Plata – Ana María Ortíz Mendoza
- Salcedo – Ada Sandra Abreu Marron
- Samaná – Yolanda Margarita Ureña Sanz
- Sánchez Ramírez – Jessica Marie Meran Ferro
- San Cristóbal – Eva Tatiana Padron Peralta
- San Juan de la Maguana – Nidez Ludwicka Arias Fermin
- San Pedro – Martha Carina González Caba
- Santiago – Ursula Bereniz German Bienvenidos
- Santiago Rodríguez – Luiza María Taveras Delirio
- Séibo – Milka Reyna Juanes Tavaras
- Valverde – Ana Gina Varbaros Oviedo
