= Duvergé =

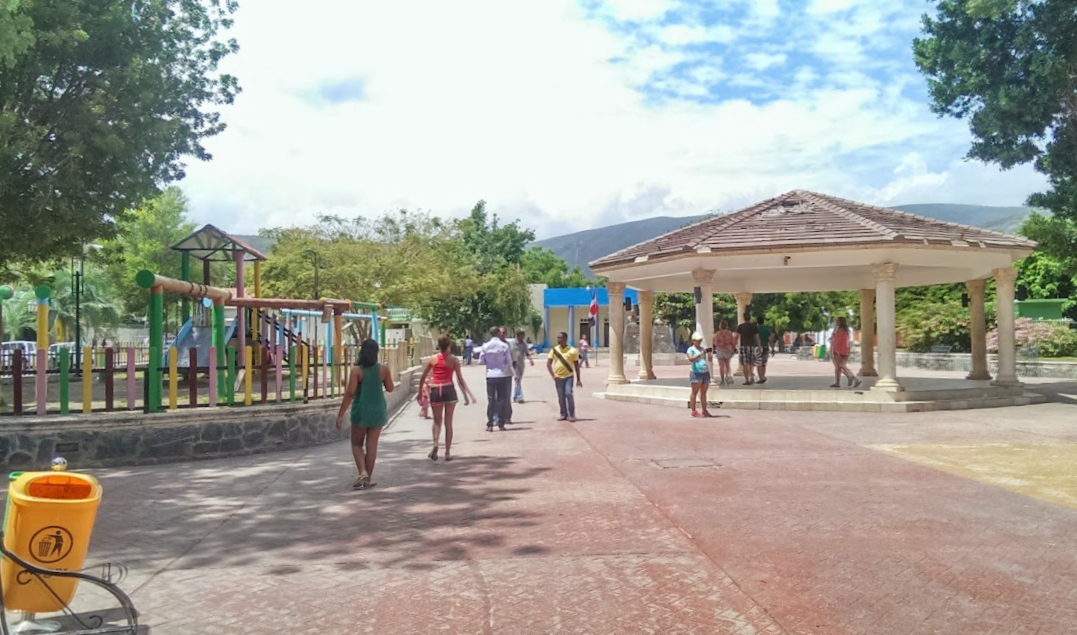

- Location within the Dominican Republic
- Coordinates: 18°22′48″N 71°21′48″W
- Country: Dominican Republic
- Province: Independencia
- Founded: 1772
- Municipality since: 1891

Area
  - Total: 521.64 km^{2} (201.41 sq mi)
- Elevation: 2 m (6.6 ft)

Population (2012)
  - Total: 19,598
  - Density: 37.570/km^{2} (97.306/sq mi)
  - Urban: 13,668
  - Demonym: Damero(a)
- Distance to – Jimaní – Santo Domingo: 41 km 245 km
- Municipal Districts: 1
- Climate: BSh

Duvergé, also known locally as Las Damas (Spanish: "the ladies", after the local Las Damas River) is the largest city in the province of Independencia in the Dominican Republic. The first settlers of this community were the gentlemen Christopher Pérez and María del Pulgar, originating from San Juan de la Maguana.

== History ==
The village became a part of Baoruco Province of Azua, on May 9, 1850 by law number 533 on territorial division.

On May 17, 1876, due to the number of inhabitants and its agricultural importance, the president Ulises Francisco Espaillat signed decree 1524, assigning the city to Azua Province.

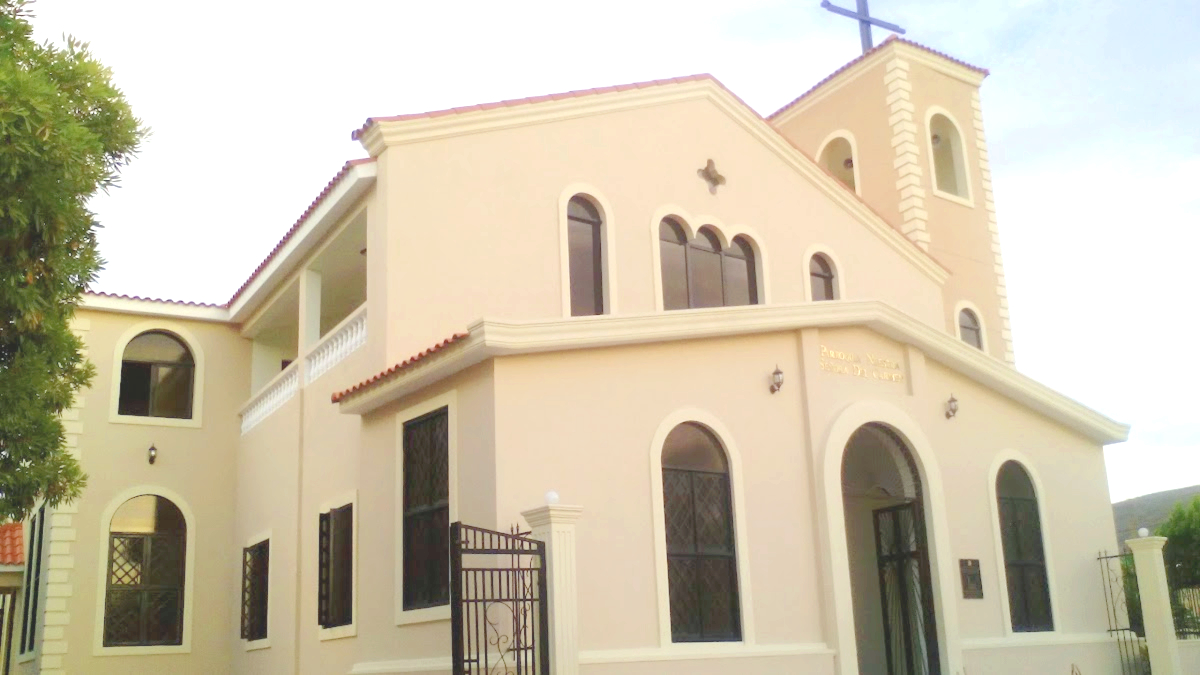
Duverge, Dominican Republic town church

On September 12, 1881, it became a part of the Maritime District of Barahona, which today is the Municipality of Enriquillo.

During the government of Ulises Heureaux, the vice president of the Republic, Wenceslao Figuereo changed the name of Las Damas to Duvergé on June 22, 1891, in honor of Dominican War of Independence general Antonio Duvergé.

Duvergé was later integrated into Barahona Province, by law number 229 on March 18, 1943.

In the year 1949, in the government of Rafael Trujillo passed law number 2107, which placed Duvergé into Independencia Province, where it stands today.

== Geography ==
The municipality of Duvergé is a plain entrenched between to mountain ranges: the Bahoruco Mountains and the Neiba Range. It is located geographically in the Neiba Valley, but politically belongs to Independencia Province.

It is 17 km from Neiba and 42 km from Jimaní, the capital of the province.

Duvergé is located in an arid area, with abundant cacti, like Melocactus lemairei. Nevertheless, it depends on currents of groundwater and superficial sources that dampen the lands, and in spite of the arid climate, the land is fertile.

== Limits ==
- North: Lago Enriquillo and Baoruco Province
- South: Pedernales Province
- East: Cristóbal
- West: Jimaní

== Area ==
The urban area extends outwards approximately 6 to 8 km from the center of the city.

The municipality of Duvergé has a territorial extension of 501.43 km^2. This population has followed an evolutionary process of growth and development marked for phases, with dynamic influences in the emigration and immigration.

The area has a population of 17,320 inhabitants, of which 12,053 live in the urban zone and 5,267 in the rural zone.

== Climate ==
Duverge has a hot semi-arid climate (Köppen climate classification: BSh).

Climate data for Duvergé (1971-2000)
Month	Jan	Feb	Mar	Apr	May	Jun	Jul	Aug	Sep	Oct	Nov	Dec	Year
Record high °C (°F)	38.0 (100.4)	38.9 (102.0)	40.0 (104.0)	40.4 (104.7)	40.2 (104.4)	—	41.2 (106.2)	42.8 (109.0)	41.4 (106.5)	41.6 (106.9)	41.0 (105.8)	—	42.8 (109.0)
Mean daily maximum °C (°F)	32.1 (89.8)	32.9 (91.2)	34.0 (93.2)	34.9 (94.8)	34.7 (94.5)	36.0 (96.8)	35.9 (96.6)	36.0 (96.8)	35.8 (96.4)	34.8 (94.6)	33.6 (92.5)	32.3 (90.1)	34.4 (93.9)
Daily mean °C (°F)	26.6 (79.9)	27.1 (80.8)	27.9 (82.2)	28.8 (83.8)	28.9 (84.0)	29.8 (85.6)	29.9 (85.8)	30.0 (86.0)	29.8 (85.6)	29.1 (84.4)	28.0 (82.4)	26.8 (80.2)	28.6 (83.4)
Mean daily minimum °C (°F)	21.0 (69.8)	21.2 (70.2)	21.8 (71.2)	22.7 (72.9)	23.1 (73.6)	23.6 (74.5)	23.9 (75.0)	23.9 (75.0)	23.8 (74.8)	23.3 (73.9)	22.3 (72.1)	21.3 (70.3)	22.7 (72.8)
Record low °C (°F)	10.2 (50.4)	—	10.0 (50.0)	—	—	—	—	—	—	—	—	—	10.0 (50.0)
Average rainfall mm (inches)	10.6 (0.42)	18.2 (0.72)	27.4 (1.08)	32.5 (1.28)	87.1 (3.43)	54.7 (2.15)	23.2 (0.91)	70.1 (2.76)	73.9 (2.91)	65.1 (2.56)	36.4 (1.43)	20.2 (0.80)	519.4 (20.45)
Source 1: National Bureau of Meteorology (ONAMET) (in Spanish): January; February; March; April; May; July; August; September; October; November
Source 2: freemeteo.com — acqweather.com

== Economy ==
The main source of income of Duvergé is agriculture. The great majority of the agricultural lands are dedicated to the production of bananas, plantains, cassava, yams, coconuts, and vegetables.

As the municipality of Duvergé borders Lake Enriquillo, fishing of tilapia in large quantities is performed, which is locally consumed and exported to the adjoining municipalities.
