= List of Miss Dominican Republic editions =

Year	Edition	Finals Date	Finals Venue	No of Contestants
1927	1st	February 27	Palacio Federal, Santo Domingo	15
1928	2nd	February 27	Palacio Federal, Santo Domingo	15
1929	3rd	February 27	Palacio Federal, Santo Domingo	15
1956	4th	January 29	Palacio Federal, Santo Domingo	24
1957	5th	March 9	Palacio Federal, Santo Domingo	24
1958	6th	April 14	Palacio Federal, Santo Domingo	24
1962	7th	January 29	La Concha Acústica del Hotel Embajador, Santo Domingo	26
1963	8th	January 29	La Concha Acústica del Hotel Embajador, Santo Domingo	14
1964	9th	January 31	La Concha Acústica del Hotel Embajador, Santo Domingo	12
1965	10th	February 20	La Concha Acústica del Hotel Embajador, Santo Domingo	26
1966	Special for Miss World	September 30	La Concha Acústica del Hotel Embajador, Santo Domingo	26
1967	11th	January 29	La Concha Acústica del Hotel Embajador, Santo Domingo	24
1968	12th	January 24	La Concha Acústica del Hotel Embajador, Santo Domingo	24
1969	13th	May 24	La Concha Acústica del Hotel Embajador, Santo Domingo	30
1970	14th	January 24	Palacio de las Bellas Artes, Santo Domingo	28
1971	15th	January 19	Auditorio del Bueno Café del Hotel Lina, Santo Domingo	28
1972	16th	March 1	Auditorio del Bueno Café del Hotel Lina, Santo Domingo	28
1973	17th	January 29	Auditorio del Bueno Café del Hotel Lina, Santo Domingo	28
1974	18th	February 2	La Concha Acústica del Hotel Embajador, Santo Domingo	28
1975	19th	April 26	La Concha Acústica del Hotel Embajador, Santo Domingo	28
1976	20th	February 23	Carnaval de la Feria del Hotel Hyatt, Santo Domingo	28
1977	Special Selections	May 15	Oficina de la Secretaria de Estado de Turismo, Santo Domingo	–
1978	21st	December 14, 1977	Carnaval de la Feria del Hotel Hyatt, Santo Domingo	28
1979	22nd	December 20, 1978	Carnaval de la Feria del Hotel Hyatt, Santo Domingo	28
1980	23rd	April 19, 1979	Night Club La Fuente del Hotel Jaragua, Santo Domingo	18
1981	24th	May 9, 1980	Night Club La Fuente del Hotel Jaragua, Santo Domingo	20
1982	25th	June 18, 1981	Night Club La Fuente del Hotel Jaragua, Santo Domingo	26
1983	26th	August 20, 1982	Palacio de las Bellas Artes, Santo Domingo	18
1984	27th	July 18, 1983	Palacio de las Bellas Artes, Santo Domingo	18
1985	28th	December 10, 1984	Auditorio del Bueno Café del Hotel Lina, Santo Domingo	24
1986	29th	December 19, 1985	Renaissance Auditorio de Festival del Hotel Jaragua, Santo Domingo	24
1987	30th	December 10, 1986	Auditorio del Centro León, Santiago de los Caballeros	19
1988	31st	October 12, 1987	Casa de España, Santo Domingo	18
1989	32nd	December 19, 1988	Palacio de los Deportes, Santo Domingo	28
1990	33rd	September 1, 1989	Estudio A de Rahintel, Santo Domingo	22
1991	34th	August 21, 1990	Auditorio de la Tasita de Plata en Hotel Eurotel Beach Resort & Casino, Puerto Plata	24
1992	35th	December 18, 1991	Palacio de los Deportes, Santo Domingo	22
1993	36th	July 28, 1992	Auditorio del Acuario Nacional de la República Dominicana, Santo Domingo	26
1994	37th	August 4, 1993	Gran Teatro del Cibao, Santiago de los Caballeros	24
1995	38th	December 2, 1994	Renaissance Auditorio de Festival del Hotel Jaragua, Santo Domingo	30
1996	39th	December 16, 1995	Renaissance Auditorio de Festival del Hotel Jaragua, Santo Domingo	24
1997	40th	December 10, 1996	Renaissance Auditorio de Festival del Hotel Jaragua, Santo Domingo	24
1998	41st	December 12, 1997	Renaissance Auditorio de Festival del Hotel Jaragua, Santo Domingo	22
1999	42nd	June 2, 1998	Renaissance Auditorio de Festival del Hotel Jaragua, Santo Domingo	32
2000	43rd	March 5	Renaissance Auditorio de Festival del Hotel Jaragua, Santo Domingo	54
2001*	44th	April 9	Renaissance Auditorio de Festival del Hotel Jaragua, Santo Domingo	26
2001	45th	July 1	Teatro Nacional Eduardo Brito, Santo Domingo	24
2002	46th	July 29	Teatro Nacional Eduardo Brito, Santo Domingo	30
2004	47th	April 3	Palacio de los Deportes, Santo Domingo	35
2005	48th	April 9	Palacio de los Deportes, Santo Domingo	46
2006	49th	December 18, 2005	Palacio de los Deportes, Santo Domingo	21
2007	50th	March 22	Renaissance Auditorio de Festival del Hotel Jaragua, Santo Domingo	20
2008	51st	December 3, 2007	Antena Estudio del Canal 4, Santo Domingo	9
2009	52nd	May 17	Centro de Convenciones de Sans Souci, Santo Domingo Este	22
2010	53rd	April 17	Renaissance Auditorio de Festival del Hotel Jaragua, Santo Domingo	36
2011	54th	March 8	Renaissance Auditorio de Festival del Hotel Jaragua, Santo Domingo	36
2012	55th	April 17	Renaissance Auditorio de Festival del Hotel Jaragua, Santo Domingo	37
2013	56th	August 3	Auditorio del Punta Cana's Hard Rock Hotel & Casino, Salvaleón de Higüey	28
2014	57th	August 17	Teatro Nacional Eduardo Brito, Santo Domingo	33
2015	58th	August 30	Renaissance Auditorio de Festival del Hotel Jaragua, Santo Domingo	30
2016	59th	April 24	Renaissance Auditorio de Festival del Hotel Jaragua, Santo Domingo	30
2017	60th	August 26	Gran Teatro del Cibao, Santiago de los Caballeros	31
2018	61st	August 26	Gran Arena del Cibao, Santiago de los Caballeros	20
2019	62nd	August 18	Teatro Nacional Eduardo Brito, Santo Domingo	27
2020	Special Selections	October 1	Estudios de Color Visión (Canal 9), Santo Domingo	–
2021	63rd	November 7	Salón de Eventos Sambil, Santo Domingo	15
2022	Special Selections	April 27	Salón de Eventos Sambil, Santo Domingo	–
2023	64th	September 3	Salón de Eventos Sambil, Santo Domingo	24
2024	65th	May 5	Salón de Eventos Sambil, Santo Domingo	18

- *Special pageant for Miss Universe & World 2001
- **The Miss Dominican Republic 2000 in July 1999 was revoked as an edition to be able to remake the pageant in March 2000.
