= Miss Mundo Dominicana 2003 =

- Date: September 19, 2002
- Venue: Palacio de los Deporte, Santo Domingo, Dominican Republic
- Broadcaster: Canal 11
- Entrants: 40
- Placements: 18
- Winner: María Eugenia Vargas; Sánchez Ramírez

Miss Mundo Dominicana 2003 pageant was held at the Palacio de los Deporte in Santo Domingo, Dominican Republic, on September 19, 2002.

At the end of the event, María Eugenia Vargas of Sánchez Ramírez was crowned Miss Mundo Dominicana 2003. Vargas represented the Dominican Republic at Miss World 2003, held in Sanya, China, where she placed as a top twenty semifinalist.

== Results ==
=== Placements ===
Placement	Contestant
Miss Mundo Dominicana 2003	Sánchez Ramírez – María Eugenia Vargas
1st Runner-Up	Dajabón – Elizabeth Rondón
2nd Runner-Up	Moca – María Guzmán
3rd Runner-Up	New York – Suanny Frotaán
4th Runner-Up	La Altagracia – Milka Ramos
5th Runner-Up	Distrito Nacional – Elizabeth Matos
Top 12	Canada – Mariasela Esmero; El Seibo – Oliva de Soto; La Romana – Dayani Altagracia Jiménez; Peravia – Eva Cuello; Samaná – Alicia Oviedo; San Juan – Tatiana Vargas
Top 18	Independencia – Denise Rivera; María Trinidad Sánchez – Bárbara Gómez; Monte Plata – Elisa Mayos; Puerto Plata – Milly Grono; Rhode Island – Roselkys Tavarez; San Pedro de Macorís – Alisa Castaño

=== Special awards ===
- Miss Photogenic (voted by press reporters) - María Guzmán(Moca, Dominican Republic)
- Miss Congeniality (voted by Miss Dominican Republic Universe contestants) - Maria Guzman (Moca, Dominican Republic)
- Best Face - Maria Guzman (Moca, Dominican Republic)
- Best Provincial Costume - Margarita Rosario (Santiago Rodríguez)
- Best Hair - Elixandra Tobias (San Cristóbal)
- Miss Elegancia - Odalisse Meran (Azua)
- Miss Amistad - Dayani Altagracia Jiménez (La Romana)

== Miss Dominican Regions ==
- Miss Region del Cibao Occidental : Elizabeth Rondón (Dajabón)
- Miss Region del Cibao Oriental : María Vargas (Sánchez Ramírez)
- Miss Region del El Valle de Enriquillo : María Alejandra Guzmán (Pedernales)
- Miss Region del Exterior : Suanny Frotaán (Com. Dom. NY)
- Miss Region del Higüamo : Milka Ramos (La Altagracia)
- Miss Region del Ozama : Elizabeth Matos (Distrito Nacional)

== Delegates ==
Province, Community	Contestant	Age	Height	Hometown	Geographical Regions
Azua	Odalisse Meran Castro	25	5 ft 10 in 178 cm	Padre Las Casas	El Valle de Enriquillo
Baoruco	Sandra Hidalgo Vargas	20	5 ft 10 in 178 cm	El Palmar	El Valle de Enriquillo
Barahona	Miguelina Henríquez Stuart	19	5 ft 7 in 170 cm	Vicente Noble	El Valle de Enriquillo
Com. Dom. Canada	Mariasela Esmero Melo	23	5 ft 7 in 170 cm	Toronto	Exterior
Com. Dom. Connecticut	Carina German Faro	19	5 ft 11 in 180 cm	Hartford	Exterior
Com. Dom. Lto. America	Cinthia Peña de Lizio	23	5 ft 5 in 165 cm	Caracas	Exterior
Com. Dom. Massachusetts	Lucia Moya Alvo	21	5 ft 9 in 175 cm	Boston	Exterior
Com. Dom. Miami	Kayla Soto Ynoa	18	5 ft 8 in 173 cm	Miami Beach	Exterior
Com. Dom. NJ	Catia Gordon Ferrano	21	5 ft 11 in 180 cm	Newark	Exterior
Com. Dom. NY	Suanny Frotaán de la Cruz	20	6 ft 0 in 183 cm	New York	Exterior
Com. Dom. Orlando	Sandy de Lara Tavares	18	6 ft 0 in 183 cm	Colonial	Exterior
Com. Dom. Pennsylvania	Jeymi García Espaillat	24	5 ft 9 in 175 cm	Pittsburgh	Exterior
Com. Dom. Rhode Island	Roselkys Tavarez Golfo	19	5 ft 9 in 175 cm	Providence	Exterior
Dajabón	Elizabeth Rondón García	19	5 ft 9 in 175 cm	Loma de Cabrera	Cibao Occidental
Distrito Nacional	Elizabeth Magdalena Matos Palmas	18	6 ft 0 in 183 cm	Urbanización de El Rosal	Ozama
Duarte	Kenia Guerra Polanco	22	5 ft 7 in 170 cm	Pimentel	Cibao Oriental
Elías Piña	Lizbeth Veras Perez	19	5 ft 6 in 168 cm	San Francisco de Bánica	El Valle de Enriquillo
El Seibo	Oliva de Soto Ríos	19	5 ft 10 in 178 cm	Santa Cruz de El Seibo	Higüamo
Espaillat	Katherine Wanda Camacho Tatis	23	5 ft 10 in 178 cm	Joba Arriba	Cibao Occidental
Hato Mayor	Fernanda Sosa Santana	18	5 ft 8 in 173 cm	Sabana de la Mar	Higüamo
Independencia	Denise Rivera Sosa	28	5 ft 11 in 180 cm	Jimaní	El Valle de Enriquillo
La Altagracia	Milka Ramos Javier	18	6 ft 0 in 183 cm	Bahia Buena	Higüamo
La Romana	Dayani Altagracia Jiménez	21	5 ft 8 in 173 cm	La Romana	Higüamo
La Vega	Carolina Gianela Rodríguez Familias	21	5 ft 11 in 180 cm	Concepción de La Vega	Cibao Occidental
María Trinidad Sánchez	Bárbara Gómez Batista	18	6 ft 0 in 183 cm	Trinidad Sánchez Nagua	Cibao Oriental
Monseñor Nouel	Viviana Zamora Padron	24	5 ft 11 in 180 cm	Bonao	Cibao Oriental
Monte Cristi	Ana Lucia de Arollo Sesto	20	5 ft 8 in 173 cm	Guayubín	Cibao Occidental
Monte Plata	Elisa Mayos Duarte	24	6 ft 0 in 183 cm	Sabana Grande de Boyá	Ozama
Pedernales	María Alejandra Guzmán Carmona	19	5 ft 11 in 180 cm	Pedernales	El Valle de Enriquillo
Peravia	Eva Cuello Tavares	22	5 ft 7 in 170 cm	Baní	Ozama
Puerto Plata	Milly Grono Suarez	26	5 ft 11 in 180 cm	San Felipe de Puerto Plata	Cibao Occidental
Salcedo	Emma Alvarez Granados	23	6 ft 0 in 183 cm	Tenares	Cibao Oriental
Samaná	Alicia Oviedo de la Cruz	18	5 ft 8 in 173 cm	El Limón	Cibao Oriental
Sánchez Ramírez	María Eugenia Vargas Rosario	18	6 ft 1 in 185 cm	Cotuí	Cibao Oriental
San Cristóbal	Elixandra Tobias Carasco	18	6 ft 0 in 183 cm	San Cristóbal	Ozama
San Juan	Tatiana Vargas Rosales	25	5 ft 8 in 173 cm	Las Matas de Farfán	El Valle de Enriquillo
San Pedro de Macorís	Alisa Castaño Jiménez	21	5 ft 6 in 168 cm	Quisqueya	Higüamo
Santiago	Cindy Guerrero Reynoso	24	5 ft 9 in 175 cm	Pueblo Nuevo de Navarrete	Cibao Occidental
Santiago Rodríguez	Margarita Rosario Valle	27	6 ft 0 in 183 cm	Monción	Cibao Occidental
Valverde	Luisa Peralta Ramos	22	5 ft 8 in 173 cm	Esperanza	Cibao Occidental

== Trivia ==
- Suanny Frotaan entered in Miss Dom. Rep. Universe 2003 being placed 3rd runner-up, and later winning Miss Rep. Dom. Tierra 2003.
- These delegates entered Miss Dominican Republic Universe 2003: (Com. Dom. NY), (Dajabón), (La Altagracia), (María Trinidad Sánchez), (Santiago)
- Elizabeth Rondón, Miss Dajabón would enter Miss Dominican Republic Universe 2005 and become a semifinalist.
- Odalise Meran is the sister of Miss Azua in Miss Dominican Republic Universe 2003.
