= Reina Nacional de Belleza Miss Internacional República Dominicana 2008 =

- Date: October 17, 2007
- Venue: Barceló Bávaro Convention Center, Bávaro, Dominican Republic
- Broadcaster: Super Canal 33/Super Canal Caribe
- Entrants: 28
- Placements: 15
- Winner: Claudia Mabel Peña Gómez; Monseñor Nouel

The Reina Nacional de Belleza Miss Internacional República Dominicana 2008 pageant will be held on October 17, 2007. This year only 28 candidates are competing for the national crown. The chosen winner will represent the Dominican Republic at the Miss International 2008 and other small international pageant which was held in Macau.

== Results ==
=== Placements ===
Placement	Contestant
RNB Miss Internacional República Dominicana 2008	Monseñor Nouel – Claudia Peña
1st Runner-Up	Santiago – Rocío Castellanos
2nd Runner-Up	Distrito Nacional – Alexandra Díaz
3rd Runner-Up	Monte Cristi – Rosiell Polanco
4th Runner-Up	Duarte – Obelíz Antigua
Top 10	Elías Piña – Pamela Nina; La Altagracia – Melany Batista; Puerto Plata – Katiuska Rodríguez; Samaná – Alexandra Rosario; San Pedro de Macorís – Leslie Domínguez
Top 15	Espaillat – Dayhana Hernández; Jarabacoa – Clariluz Ortíz; San Cristóbal – Arisleidy Mateo; Salcedo – Marlin García; United States – Melissa Pérez

=== Special awards ===
- Miss Photogenic (voted by press reporters) - Obelíz Antigua (Duarte)
- Miss Congeniality (voted by contestants) - Melany Batista (La Altagracia)
- Best Face - Claudia Peña (Monseñor Nouel)
- Best Provincial Costume - Rosiell Polanco (Monte Cristi)
- Best Hair - Eva Gazo (Azua)
- Miss Elegancia - Laura Rosal (Valverde)
- Best eyes - Claudia Peña (Monseñor Nouel)

== Delegates ==
Province, Community	Contestant	Age	Height	Hometown
Azua	Eva María Gazo Suarez	20	175 cm 5 ft 9 in	Santo Domingo
Com. Dom. EU	Melissa Pérez Alvarado	18	157 cm 5 ft 2 in	New York
Constanza	Venny Quezada	24	169 cm 5 ft 7 in	Concepción de la Vega
Distrito Nacional	Alexandra Díaz Bello Ruiz	23	178 cm 5 ft 10 in	Santo Domingo
Duarte	Obelíz Antigua Zamora	18	177 cm 5 ft 10 in	San Francisco
Elías Piña	Pamela Yamel Nina Eugenio	20	170 cm 5 ft 7 in	Comendador
El Seibo	Rosanna Candelario Varoni	18	179 cm 5 ft 10 in	El Seibo
Espaillat	Dayhana Hernández Almos	22	181 cm 5 ft 11 in	Moca
Haina	Lisbeth Almánzar López	23	174 cm 5 ft 9 in	Santo Domingo
Jarabacoa	Clariluz Ortíz Cavozio	18	176 cm 5 ft 9 in	Concepción de la Vega
La Altagracia	Melany Tatiana Batista Hidalgo	21	180 cm 5 ft 11 in	Punta Cana
La Romana	Ruth Guerrero	24	167 cm 5 ft 6 in	Santo Domingo
La Vega	Caroni Calderón Matos	23	174 cm 5 ft 9 in	Concepción de la Vega
María Trinidad Sánchez	Luisa Mariel de la Cruz	27	172 cm 5 ft 8 in	Santo Domingo
Monseñor Nouel	Claudia Mabel Peña Gómez	19	182 cm 6 ft 0 in	Bonao
Monte Cristi	Rosiell Polanco Maro	20	183 cm 6 ft 0 in	San Fernando de Monte Cristi
Monte Plata	Erika Lombert	23	180 cm 5 ft 11 in	Santo Domingo
Puerto Plata	Katiuska Rodríguez Duarte	21	181 cm 5 ft 11 in	Sosúa
Salcedo	Marlin García Camacho	21	171 cm 5 ft 7 in	Santo Domingo
Samaná	Alexandra Rosario Tavarez	25	173 cm 5 ft 8 in	Santa Bárbara de Samaná
San Cristóbal	Arisleidy Mateo Duarte	20	172 cm 5 ft 8 in	San Cristóbal
San Juan	Kenia Rodríguez	22	175 cm 5 ft 9 in	Santo Domingo
San Pedro de Macorís	Leslie Domínguez Lavos	17	178 cm 5 ft 10 in	San Pedro de Macorís
Santiago	Rocío Elizabeth Castellanos Matías	20	179 cm 5 ft 10 in	Santiago de los Caballeros
Santiago Rodríguez	Mavelyn Paredes	19	184 cm 6 ft 0 in	San Ignacio de Sabaneta
Santo Domingo Este	Joneidy Reynosa Tavares	25	168 cm 5 ft 6 in	Los Minas
Santo Domingo Norte	Ana García Ceballos	23	180 cm 5 ft 11 in	Santiago de los Caballeros
Valverde	Laura Rosal Ramos	21	170 cm 5 ft 7 in	Mao

== Trivia ==
- Melanie Batista, Miss La Altagracia entered in Miss RD Universo '05
- Miss Monseñor Nouel would enter in Miss RD Universo '07 and would withdraw due to college.
- Rocio Castellanos, Miss Santiago would enter in Miss Dominican Republic Universe 2009 and would be the 2nd runner up.
