= Miss Dominican Republic 2010 =

- Date: April 17, 2010
- Presenters: Luis Manuel Aguiló; Renata Soñé; Luz García
- Entertainment: Los Ilegales; Servando y Florentino; Victor Manuelle
- Venue: Renaissance Auditorio de Festival del Hotel Jaragua, Santo Domingo, Dominican Republic
- Broadcaster: Antena Latina; Canal 21
- Entrants: 36
- Placements: 15
- Debuts: Baoruco; Bahoruco
- Returns: Azua; Baoruco; Com.Dom. Puerto Rico; Elías Piña; El Seibo; Espaillat; Independencia; María Trinidad Sánchez; Pedernales; Puerto Plata; Samaná; San Juan; Sánchez Ramírez; Santiago Rodríguez
- Winner: Eva Arias; Espaillat

The Miss República Dominicana 2010 was celebrated on April 17, 2010 at the Teatro La Fiesta, Hotel Jaragua in Santo Domingo.

The winner represented Dominican Republic in Miss Universe 2010. The Miss RD Continente Americano entered Miss Continente Américano 2010 and the Miss RD Hispanoamericana entered Reina Hispanoamericana 2010. The 3rd Runner Up entered Miss Worldovision 2010. The 4th Runner Up entered Miss Global Teen 2010. The 5th Runner Up would enter Miss Intercontinental 2010.

== Results ==
=== Placements ===
Placement	Contestant
Miss Dominican Republic 2010	Espaillat – Eva Arias
1st Runner-Up	Samaná – Alma Álvarez
2nd Runner-Up	Dajabón – Stéphanie Liriano
3rd Runner-Up	Com.Dom. EEUU – Libell Durán
4th Runner-Up	San Cristóbal – Mayté Brito
5th Runner-Up	Hermanas Mirabal – Olgalid Navarro
Top 10	Monte Cristi – Karolynne Ureña; San José de Ocoa – Marina García; Distrito Nacional – Gabriela Desangles; Valverde – Albanery Badía
Top 15	La Vega – Luz Rosario; Bahoruco – Sarah Féliz; Monte Plata – Yennifer Cerdán; Duarte – Yuberkis Mateo; Santiago – Catherine Ramírez

== Contestants ==
Province	Contestant	Age	Height	Hometown
Azua	Wendy Larissa Pinales López	22	1.71 m (5 ft 7 1/4 in)	Puerto Plata
Baoruco	Sarah Patricia Féliz Mok	22	1.78 m (5 ft 10 in)	Neiba
Barahona	Bianka Vargas Molina	26	1.81 m (5 ft 11 1/4 in)	Santo Domingo
Com. Dom. En Estados Unidos	Libell Durán Caba	19	1.73 m (5 ft 8 in)	Newark
Com. Dom. En Puerto Rico	Vastty Abreu Gómez	21	1.79 m (5 ft 10 1/2 in)	Bayamón
Dajabón	Stéphanie Liriano Alcántara	21	1.75 m (5 ft 9 in)	Santiago
Distrito Nacional	Gabriela Desangles Pérez	22	1.74 m (5 ft 8 1/2 in)	Santo Domingo
Duarte	Yuberkis Mateo Pérez	20	1.82 m (5 ft 11 3/4 in)	San Fco. Macorís
El Seibo	Elba Margarita Díaz Pujols	24	1.75 m (5 ft 9 in)	La Romana
Elías Piña	Jennifer Santiago Núñez	23	1.71 m (5 ft 7 1/4 in)	Santiago
Espaillat	Eva Carolina Arias Viñas	24	1.81 m (5 ft 11 1/4 in)	Moca
Hato Mayor	Nelly Naiden Javier Jiménez	18	1.76 m (5 ft 9 1/4 in)	Santo Domingo
Hermanas Mirabal	Olga Lidia Navarro Santos	18	1.77 m (5 ft 9 3/4 in)	Santo Domingo
Independencia	Juana Esmeralda Bello García	25	1.78 m (5 ft 10 in)	Jimaní
La Altagracia	Scarling López Beras	18	1.79 m (5 ft 10 1/2 in)	Higüey
La Romana	Mabel Silfa Arredondo	26	1.73 m (5 ft 8 in)	La Romana
La Vega	Luz del Carmen Rosario Almonte	20	1.78 m (5 ft 10 in)	La Vega
María Trinidad Sánchez	Yahaira Miguelina Alonzo Peña	23	1.73 m (5 ft 8 in)	Nagua
Monseñor Nouel	Raigna Vargas Joga	19	1.74 m (5 ft 8 1/2 in)	Bonao
Monte Cristi	Karolynne Sofya Ureña Capellán	24	1.74 m (5 ft 8 1/2 in)	Santiago
Monte Plata	Yennifer Cerdán Pérez	23	1.76 m (5 ft 9 1/4 in)	Santiago
Pedernales	Brigida Mendoza Peguero	24	1.65 m (5 ft 5 in)	Pedernales
Peravia	Risaldy Tejeda Guerrero	20	1.71 m (5 ft 7 1/4 in)	Baní
Puerto Plata	Juliana Sarah Bautista Salvador	18	1.72 m (5 ft 7 3/4 in)	Puerto Plata
Samaná	Alma Virginia Álvarez Alfonso	18	1.78 m (5 ft 10 in)	Santiago
San Cristóbal	Clara Mayté Brito Medina	18	1.74 m (5 ft 8 1/2 in)	San Cristóbal
San José de Ocoa	María Nazaret García Oviedo	20	1.81 m (5 ft 11 1/4 in)	San José de Ocoa
San Juan	Audi Mercedes Madé García	20	1.86 m (6 ft 1 1/4 in)	Nizao
San Pedro de Macorís	Lucía Olivero Montero	22	1.83 m (6 ft 0 in)	San Pedro de Macorís
Sánchez Ramírez	Miriam Mercedes Cruz Núñez	26	1.79 m (5 ft 10 1/2 in)	Santo Domingo
Santiago	Catherine Mabel Ramírez Rosario	22	1.83 m (6 ft 0 in)	Santiago
Santiago Rodríguez	Paola Almonte Disla	23	1.78 m (5 ft 10 in)	San Ign. Sabaneta
Santo Domingo Este	Iris Maritza Pinales López	22	1.71 m (5 ft 7 1/4 in)	Puerto Plata
Santo Domingo Norte	María Leonela Gálvez Germán	22	1.63 m (5 ft 4 1/4 in)	Santo Domingo
Santo Domingo Oeste	Carla Yonaitis Pimentel Beato	21	1.76 m (5 ft 9 1/4 in)	Santo Domingo
Valverde	Albanery Bereniz Badía Reyes	25	1.74 m (5 ft 8 1/2 in)	Santo Domingo
