= Ada de la Cruz =

Dominican model and beauty queen

Ada Aimée de la Cruz
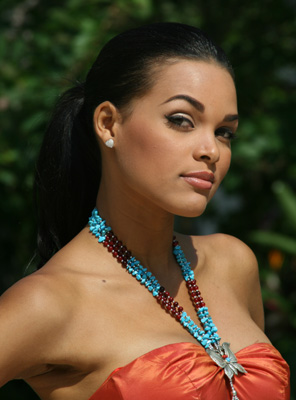
- de la Cruz in 2007
- Born: Ada Aimée de la Cruz Ramírez; June 15, 1986 (age 40); Villa Mella, Santo Domingo Province, Dominican Republic
- Height: 5 ft 11 in (1.80 m)
- Beauty pageant titleholder
- Title: Miss Mundo Dominicana 2007; Miss Dominican Republic 2009
- Hair color: Black
- Eye color: Brown
- Major competitions: Miss Dominican Republic 2007 (Top 10); Miss Mundo Dominicana 2007 (Winner); Miss World 2007 (Top 16); Miss Dominican Republic 2009 (Winner) (Best Smile) (Miss Internet); Miss Universe 2009 (1st Runner-Up)

Ada Aimée de la Cruz Ramírez (born June 15, 1986, in Villa Mella) is a Dominican model and beauty pageant titleholder who was crowned Miss Dominican Republic 2009 and placed 1st Runner-Up at the Miss Universe 2009 competition in Nassau, Bahamas. She was previously crowned Miss Mundo Dominicana 2007 and placed in the Top 16 at the Miss World 2007 pageant held in Sanya, China.

== Biography ==
She first came to fame as Miss Dominican Republic World 2007, where she placed in the top 16 at Miss World 2007 and was Miss World Beach Beauty 2007. She later was crowned Miss Dominican Republic Universe 2009. She represented the original home of her grandparents, the Province of San José de Ocoa and represented the Dominican Republic at the Miss Universe 2009 gaining high praise and finishing as First Runner Up.

Ada was born in Villa Mella and raised in Villa Altagracia and returned to Santo Domingo at the age of 14, lives with her mother Ana Martínez Ramírez, grandparents Celeste Ramírez and Ventura Garabito, her younger brother Adrián and her little cousin. In the Dominican press, she is known as a Dominican Cinderella, in which her grandmother was a maid and her whole family grew up poor.

== Pageantry and Modeling ==
She also competed in the Miss Dominican Republic Universe 2007, where she remained among the Top 10 semifinalists. She has participated in international gateways, such as Miami Fashion Week, New York Fashion Week, Dominicana Moda, among others.

== Miss World 2007 ==
As Miss Mundo Dominicana 2007, Ada represented the Dominican Republic at the Miss World 2007 pageant held on December 1, 2007 at the Crown of Beauty Theatre in Sanya, China. During the pageant's fast-track events, Ada won the Beach Beauty Challenge, becoming the first and only Dominican to do so. In the pageant's coronation night, Ada ultimately placed among the Top 16 semi-finalists along with Yendi Phillipps of Jamaica and Deborah Priya Henry of Malaysia, both who later competed at Miss Universe in 2010 and 2011 respectively, with Zhang Zilin of China being crowned the winner of the Miss World 2007 pageant.

== Miss Universe 2009 ==
In the competition, Ada was awarded the 2nd best body in the swimsuit competition in Miss Universe 2009. On August 23, 2009, during the final ceremony, Ada received the highest scores in the evening gown and the second highest in the swimsuit competitions. She walked in her gown to which judges awarded a 9.428. In swimsuit, she was awarded 9.189, despite achieving the highest overall score, de la Cruz was the eventual first runner up. Same situation happened one year before in Miss Universe 2008 with Taliana Vargas.

She is one of only nine former Miss World semifinalists to place in the Miss Universe semifinals, the others being Michelle McLean of Namibia in 1992, Christine Straw of Jamaica in 2004, Yendi Phillipps also of Jamaica in 2010, Patricia Yurena Rodríguez of Spain in 2013, Olivia Jordan of the USA in 2015, Catriona Gray of the Philippines in 2018, and Julia Gama of Brazil and Andrea Meza of Mexico both in 2020 (coincidentally de la Cruz, Phillips, Rodriguez, and Gama all finished as 1st Runner-Up).

Awards and achievements
Preceded by (Colombia) Taliana Vargas	Miss Universe 1st Runner-Up; 2009	Succeeded by (Jamaica) Yendi Phillipps
Preceded by Marianne Cruz	Miss Dominican Republic; 2009	Succeeded by Eva Arias
Preceded by Vilma Vega Báez	Miss San José de Ocoa; 2009	Succeeded by Marina García
Preceded by (Venezuela) Federica Guzmán	Miss World Beach Beauty; 2007	Succeeded by (Mexico) Anagabriela Espinoza
Preceded by Paola Torres	Miss Mundo Dominicana; 2007	Succeeded by Geisha Montes de Oca
