= María Alejandra Guzmán =

Dominican TV and radio hostess, actress, model (born 1984)

- Born: María Alejandra Guzmán Carmona; October 4, 1984 (age 42); Santo Domingo, Dominican Republic
- Presenting career
- Show: Más Roberto
- Station: Telesistema (Channel 11)
- Network: Grupo de Medios Corripio
- Time slot: 2012-2013
- Show: Famosos Inside
- Station: CDN (Channel 37)
- Network: NCDN
- Time slot: 2013–present
- Country: Dominican Republic
- Website: mariaalejandraguzman.com

María Alejandra Guzmán Carmona (born 4 October 1984), most known as María Alejandra, María Guzmán, or María Alejandra Guzmán, is a Dominican TV and radio hostess, master of ceremonies, actress and model.

María Alejandra Guzmán was born in Santo Domingo, into a Cibaeño family. She participated in Miss World Dominican Republic 2003, been awarded with the Miss Photogenic title. She started her career working for CDN2 (now CDN Sportsmax), a television station based in Santiago de los Caballeros.

She worked on Más Roberto, a weekend TV programme from 2012, until September 2013. In 2013 she was elected by Luz García’s Noche de Luz programme as a "Summer’s Hot Body".

== Filmography ==
- 2012: Feo de Día, Lindo de Noche —Alfonso Rodríguez (director)
- 2013: Mi Angelito Favorito —Alfonso Rodríguez (director)
