= Eva Arias =

Eva Arias may refer to:

- Eva Arias (model) (born 1985), model from the Dominican Republic
- Eva Arias (athlete) (born 1980), Spanish runner
