= Miss Dominican Republic 1958 =

- Date: April 14, 1958
- Venue: Palacio Federal, Santo Domingo, Dominican Republic
- Entrants: 24
- Debuts: Valverde
- Winner: Julia Cesarina Acosta Marrón; Espaillat

Señorita República Dominicana 1958 was held on April 14, 1958. The pageant had 24 delegates that represented their province. The delegates had to be born in the province they were born.

The pageant was held at the federal palace. The competition included an introduction and dresses. The top 10 competed in evening gown and swimsuit competitions, and the top 5 answered questions, all in the same order. The winner would be in luxury in the city of San Felipe de Puerto Plata.

The original pageant was held in 1928 where they would crown a delegate from a province. It was canceled in 1930 when Rafael Trujillo became president.

== Results ==
- Señorita República Dominicana 1958 : Julia Cesarina Acosta Marrón (Espaillat)
- 1st Runner Up : Angelica Rosario (Provincia de Jarabacoa)
- 2nd Runner Up : Fausta Espinal (San Rafael)
- 3rd Runner Up : María Rosario (Puerto Plata)
- 4th Runner Up : Germania Ruiz (Barahona)

Top 10

- Sandra Medina (Santiago)
- Rosario de Las Palmas (Azua)
- Cristina de Jesus (Salcedo)
- Ana Echavarria (Pedernales)
- Myriam Villanueva (José Trujillo Valdez)

== Delegates ==
- Azua - Rosario de Las Palmas Corona
- Baoruco - Isaura Ferro Wendon
- Barahona - Germania Ruiz Xavier
- Benefactor - Carolina Delerion Peralta
- Distrito Nacional - Aimee Catarina Ynoa Mena
- Duarte - Sofia Desireé Melo Duvergé
- Espaillat - Julia Cesarina Acosta Marrón
- José Trujillo Valdez - Myriam Villanueva Rojas
- La Altagracia - María José Tejada Quiros
- La Vega - Teresita Ramos Rodríguez
- Libertador - Marina Ureña Vargas
- Monte Cristi -Mariana Angelita Reyes Albono
- Provincia de Jarabacoa - Angelica María Rosario Mota
- Pedernales - Ana Silvana Echavarria Abreu
- Puerto Plata - María Altagracia Rosario Ureña
- Salcedo - Cristina de Jesus Toronja
- Samaná - Carina Alejandra Hidalgo Sobrano
- San Pedro de Macorís - Janet Laura Zamora Peña
- San Rafael - Fausta Espinal Camacho
- Santiago - Sandra Alejandrina Medina Mateo
- Santiago Rodríguez - Manuela Abreu Bienvenido
- Séibo - María Reyni Colón Ramos
- Trujillo - Ana María Zaragoza Tarros
- Valverde - María Johanna Tarragona Acosta
