= Miss Dominican Republic 1957 =

- Date: March 9, 1957
- Venue: Palacio Federal, Santo Domingo, Dominican Republic
- Entrants: 24
- Debuts: Beata (as Pedernales), Distrito de Santo Domingo (as Distrito Nacional)
- Winner: Belgica Margarita Mota de la Cruz; Pedernales

Señorita República Dominicana 1957 was held on March 9, 1957. The pageant had 24 delegates that represented their provinces. The delegates had to be born in the province they represented. The pageant was held at the federal palace. The competition was intros and dresses. Then, in the top 10, they start with the evening gown and swimsuit, and in the top 5, they answer questions, all in the same order. The winner would be in luxury in the city of San Felipe de Puerto Plata. The original pageant was in 1928, where they would crown a delegate from a province. It was canceled in 1930, when Trujillo became leader.

== Results ==
- Señorita República Dominicana 1957: Belgica Margarita Mota de la Cruz (Pedernales)
- 1st Runner-up: Silvana Medina (Séibo)
- 2nd Runner-up: Ada Reynosa (Baoruco)
- 3rd Runner-up: Soraida Cruz (Santiago Rodríguez)
- 4th Runner-up: Sandra Batista (Benefactor)

Top 10

- María López (Libertador)
- Viviana Núñez (Santiago)
- Ana Méndez (Monte Cristi)
- Ericka Tavarez (Distrito Nacional)
- Isabela García (Puerto Plata)

== Delegates ==
- Azua - Reyna Alcantara Savoy
- Baoruco - Ada Reynosa Espinal
- Barahona - Alma Rosa Fiallo Tosado
- Benefactor - Sandra Batista Veron
- Colón - Gemma Hidalgo Cormaron
- Distrito Nacional - Ericka María Tavarez Suarez
- Duarte - Isabel Germoso Duran
- Espaillat - Laura Cartagena de la Torres
- José Trujillo Valdez - Diana Henriqueta Mena Tenerife
- La Altagracia - Mayra Agnes Collado Ferro
- La Vega - Elizabeth Zamora Sandrano
- Libertador - María Caridad López Herrera
- Monte Cristi - Ana María Méndez Cruz
- Provincia de Jarabacoa - Anaida Tatiana Múñoz Múñoz
- Pedernales - Belgica Margarita Mota de la Cruz
- Puerto Plata - Isabela del Carmen García Altamirano
- Salcedo - Nadia Gúzman de Aroyo
- Samaná - Yoneidys Almeida de la Rosa
- San Pedro de Macorís - Silvia Oviedo Zaragoza
- San Rafael - Amparo Tatis Xavier
- Santiago - Viviana Victoria Núñez Camacho
- Santiago Rodríguez - Soraida Cruz Wilton
- Séibo - Silvana Aurora Medina Espinoza
- Trujillo - Oneidys Ramos Acosta
