= Miss Mundo Dominicana 2007 =

Pageant contest

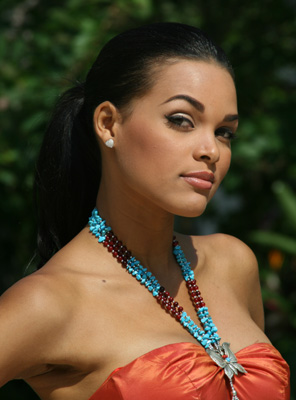
- Ada de la Cruz in Sanya, China at Miss World 2007
- Date: July 14, 2007
- Venue: Salón Principal de Casa de España, Santo Domingo Este, Dominican Republic
- Broadcaster: Canal 7
- Entrants: 24
- Winner: Ada Aimee de la Cruz González; San Cristóbal

The Miss Mundo Dominicana 2007 pageant was held on July 14, 2007. Only 24 candidates competed for the national crown. The chosen winner represented the Dominican Republic at the Miss World 2007. They selected 2 delegates would be elected from each regions. Then they chose a delegate from each region and would get sashed with the name of the region and automatically would be in the Final 6. The first runner up represented the Dominican Republic in Miss América Latina 2008.

== Results ==
- Miss Mundo Dominicana 2007 : Ada Aimee de la Cruz González (San Cristóbal)
- 1st Runner Up : Esther Tejeda (Barahona)
- 2nd Runner Up : Carolyn Aquino (Samaná)
- 3rd Runner Up : Yisney Lagrange (Santo Domingo)
- 4th Runner Up : Smaylin Almonte (Santiago)

Top 12

- Sally García (El Seibo)
- Carol Fuente (Puerto Plata)
- Elecia Mateo (La Romana)
- Llena Bencosme (Com. Dom. Miami)
- Susie Alfonseca (Pedernales)
- Lussy Mejía (Com. Dom. Lto. America)
- Katherine Ceballos (Monseñor Nouel)

=== Special awards ===
- Miss Photogenic (voted by press reporters) - Arlette Rodríguez (Santiago Rodríguez)
- Miss Congeniality (voted by contestants) - Seily Then (La Altagracia)
- Best Face - Lucia Collado (Distrito Nacional)
- Best Provincial Costume - Elizabeth Espinal (Com. Dom. Rhode Island)
- Best Hair - Alma Ruiz (Independencia)
- Miss Elegancia – Andrea Suarez (Salcedo)
- Miss Talented - Yiney Langrage (Santo Domingo)
- Miss Sport - Esther Tejeda (Barahona)
- Miss Beach - Ada de la Cruz (San Cristóbal)

== Miss Dominican Regions ==
- Miss Region del Cibao Occidental : Smaylin Almonte (Santiago)
- Miss Region del Cibao Oriental : Carolyn Aquino (Samaná)
- Miss Region del El Valle de Enriquillo : Esther Tejeda (Barahona)
- Miss Region del Exterior : Llena Bencosme (Com. Dom. Miami)
- Miss Region del Higüamo : Sally García (El Seibo)
- Miss Region del Ozama : Ada de la Cruz (San Cristóbal)

== Delegates ==
Province, Community	Contestant	Age	Height	Hometown	Geographical Regions
Azua	Niurbi Encarnación Ynoa	25	5 ft 7 in 170 cm	Padre Las Casas	El Valle de Enriquillo
Barahona	Esther Tejeda Cardona	19	5 ft 9 in 175 cm	Santa Cruz de Barahona	El Valle de Enriquillo
Com. Dom. Lto. America	Lussy Mejía Durán	17	5 ft 9 in 175 cm	Madrid	Exterior
Com. Dom. Miami	Llena Bencosme Vargas	22	5 ft 8 in 173 cm	Miami	Exterior
Com. Dom. Nueva York	Viviana Batista Holandez	18	5 ft 7 in 170 cm	Long Island	Exterior
Com. Dom. Rhode Island	Elizabeth Espinal Heredia	23	5 ft 9 in 175 cm	East Providence	Exterior
Distrito Nacional	Lucia Carolina Collado Sánchez	18	6 ft 0 in 183 cm	Vílla Duarte	Ozama
El Seibo	Sally García Meran	19	5 ft 8 in 173 cm	Miches	Higüamo
Independencia	Alma Ynes Ruiz Hidalgo	18	6 ft 1 in 185 cm	Duvergé	El Valle de Enriquillo
La Altagracia	Seily Reyna Then Tavares	19	5 ft 8 in 173 cm	Bávaro	Higüamo
La Romana	Elecia Mateo Abreu	20	5 ft 9 in 175 cm	Guaymate	Higüamo
Monseñor Nouel	Katherine Ceballos Miros	21	5 ft 10 in 178 cm	Piedra Blanca	Cibao Oriental
Pedernales	Susie Germania Alfonseca Matos	20	5 ft 11 in 180 cm	San Miguel de Oviedo	El Valle de Enriquillo
Puerto Plata	Carol Fuente	18	6 ft 0 in 183 cm	Imbert	Cibao Occidental
Salcedo	Andrea Suarez Lazaro	19	5 ft 11 in 180 cm	Jamao Afuera	Cibao Oriental
Samaná	Carolyn Aquino Fantino	22	5 ft 7 in 170 cm	Santa Bárbara de Samaná	Cibao Oriental
Sánchez Ramírez	Alejandra Marte Abreu	26	5 ft 8 in 173 cm	Quita Sueño	Cibao Oriental
San Cristóbal	Ada Aimee de la Cruz González	21	5 ft 11 in 180 cm	San Cristóbal	Ozama
San José de Ocoa	Lila León Zamora	21	5 ft 8 in 173 cm	La Ciénaga	Ozama
San Pedro de Macorís	Emma Lazaro Taino	23	5 ft 10 in 178 cm	Consuelo	Higüamo
Santiago	Smaylin Almonte Reynosa	18	5 ft 11 in 180 cm	Navarrete	Cibao Occidental
Santiago Rodríguez	Arlette Mabel Rodríguez Ruiz	18	6 ft 0 in 183 cm	San Ignacio de Sabaneta	Cibao Occidental
Santo Domingo	Yisney Lina Lagrange Méndez	19	5 ft 11 in 180 cm	Pedro Brand	Ozama
Valverde	Evelyn Rodríguez Veras	18	6 ft 0 in 183 cm	Maizal	Cibao Occidental

== Trivia ==
- Miss Santo Domingo entered in Reina Nacional de Belleza Miss República Dominicana 2007.
- Miss Distrito Nacional, Miss Independencia, Miss Pedernales and Miss San Cristóbal entered in Miss Dominican Republic Universe 2007
- Miss San José de Ocoa entered in Miss Dominican Republic Universe 2006
- Miss Samaná entered in Miss Dominican Republic Universe 2004
