= Miss Mundo Dominicana 2009 =

In 2009, the Miss Mundo Dominicana pageant was cancelled due to lack of money and sponsors. While the winner usually went on to represent the Dominican Republic in the Miss World 2009 beauty pageant, due to the cancellation it was decided that Miss Republica Dominicana Universo 2009 first runner-up, Ana Rita Contreras Sosa from Bayaguana, Monte Plata, would receive the title of Miss Mundo Dominicana 2009 and represent that country instead.

== Results ==
Final results	Contestant
Miss Mundo Dominicana 2009	Monte Plata - Ana Contreras
