= Miss Universe Dominicana 1999 =

- Date: June 2, 1998
- Venue: Hotel Jaragua, Santo Domingo, Dominican Republic
- Broadcaster: Telemicro
- Entrants: 32
- Winner: Luz Margarita Cecilia García Guzmán; Moca

Miss Universe República Dominicana 1999 was held on June 2, 1998. There were 32 candidates, representing provinces and municipalities, who entered. The winner would represent the Dominican Republic at Miss Universe 1999 and Miss World 1999. The Miss Internacional Dominicana would enter Miss International 1999. The first runner up would enter in Reinado Internacional del Café 1999. The second runner up would enter in Reina Mundial del Banano 1999. The third runner up would enter in Miss Atlantico 1999. The rest of the finalists entered different pageants. This edition would be the first edition to select Top 15 quarter finalist in the history of Miss Dominican Republic.

== Results ==
Final results	Contestant
Miss Universe Dominicana 1999	Moca - Luz Cecilia García Guzman
1st Runner-up	Puerto Plata - Michelle Alix
2nd Runner-up	Monte Cristi - Luisa Vargas
3rd Runner-up	Santiago - Idelkys Peña
Semi-finalists	Pedernales - Johanna Lantigua; Piedra Blanca - Nory Zamora; Valverde Mao - Soraya Espinoza; Nagua - Norbelkis Grullón; Com. Dom. Nueva York - Liz Sosa
Quarter-finalists	Constanza - Luisa de Arias; Dajabón - Loiza González; Neiba - Aida Noriega; San Cristóbal - Alma de Ruiz; Com. Dom. Miami - Eva Franco

== Delegates ==
Represented	Contestant	Age	Height	Hometown
Azua	Ednita González Merán	24	172 cm 5 ft 8 in	Santo Domingo
Barahona	Nereida Femin Grullón	22	170 cm 5 ft 7 in	Santa Cruz de Barahona
Bonao	Iris Núñez Mena	21	177 cm 5 ft 10 in	Bonao
Com. Dom. Miami	Eva Carolina Franco Guerra	18	179 cm 5 ft 10 in	Miami
Com. Dom. Nueva York	Liz Martha Sosa Polanco	23	180 cm 5 ft 11 in	Washington Heights
Constanza	Luisa Colombina de Arias Toledo	19	169 cm 5 ft 7 in	Santo Domingo
Dajabón	Loiza Isabel González Edito	21	177 cm 5 ft 10 in	Dajabón
Distrito Nacional	Carlotty Ceneyda Veras García	18	178 cm 5 ft 10 in	Villa Mella
El Seibo	Saidy Elisa Torres Correa	26	171 cm 5 ft 7 in	Santiago de los Caballeros
Hato Mayor	Anna Peña Rodríguez	22	172 cm 5 ft 8 in	Santo Domingo
Independencia	Livia Cueto Reynosa	19	169 cm 5 ft 7 in	Santo Domingo
Jarabacoa	Katherine Caba de Hernández	21	171 cm 5 ft 7 in	Moca
La Altagracia	Milagros Tatis Brito	20	176 cm 5 ft 9 in	Salvaleón de Higüey
La Romana	Loraine Bonilla Zamora	18	180 cm 5 ft 11 in	La Romana
La Vega	Emma Karina Rodríguez Camargo	23	173 cm 5 ft 8 in	Los Alcarrizos
Moca	Luz Cecilia García Guzman	19	178 cm 5 ft 10 in	Moca
Monte Plata	Alexandra Pichardo García	26	172 cm 5 ft 8 in	Santo Domingo
Nagua	Norbelkis Grullón Alvarado	21	179 cm 5 ft 10 in	Santiago de los Caballeros
Neiba	Aida Noriega Oviedo	24	181 cm 5 ft 11 in	Santo Domingo
Pedernales	Johanna Lantigua Polanco	19	174 cm 5 ft 9 in	Santiago de los Caballeros
Peravia	Patsi María Arias Arias	24	177 cm 5 ft 10 in	Baní
Piedra Blanca	Noraidy Belkis Zamora Trujillo	18	182 cm 6 ft 0 in	Moca
Puerto Plata	María Luisa Vargas Tavarez	21	180 cm 5 ft 11 in	Maimón
Salcedo	Noreikys Echavarria Andres	23	176 cm 5 ft 9 in	Santiago de los Caballeros
Samaná	Elizabeth Escaño Tavares	19	178 cm 5 ft 10 in	Santiago de los Caballeros
Sánchez Ramírez	Ana María Hidalgo Fernández	25	175 cm 5 ft 9 in	Santo Domingo
San Cristóbal	Alma de Ruiz Brito	20	168 cm 5 ft 6 in	Santo Domingo
San Juan	Dihana Polanco Súarez	20	177 cm 5 ft 10 in	Santiago de los Caballeros
San Pedro de Macorís	Sandra Sosa Benett	25	173 cm 5 ft 8 in	Santo Domingo
Santiago	Idelkys Yeara Peña Díaz	18	175 cm 5 ft 9 in	Santiago de los Caballeros
Santiago Rodríguez	Samanta de los Santos Garrido	22	169 cm 5 ft 7 in	Santiago de los Caballeros
Valverde Mao	Soraya Mary Espinoza Cevallos	18	186 cm 6 ft 1 in	Santa Cruz de Mao
