= Ana Contreras =

Dominican Republic beauty pageant

- Born: Ana Rita Contreras Sosa; July 31, 1984 (age 42); Bayaguana, Monte Plata Province, Dominican Republic
- Height: 5 ft 6.5 in (1.69 m)
- Beauty pageant titleholder
- Title: Miss Mundo Dominicana 2009
- Hair color: Dark brown
- Eye color: Brown
- Major competitions: Miss Dominican Republic 2006; Miss Dominican Republic 2009 (1st runner-up)

Ana Rita Contreras Sosa (born July 31, 1984), also known as Dominicana Prestigiosa, is a Dominican architect, business executive, and former beauty pageant titleholder who was appointed to represent the Dominican Republic at Miss World 2009. She was a competitive equestrian in her youth, winning national championships in 1996 and 1998. She later graduated summa cum laude with a degree in architecture from the Universidad Iberoamericana (UNIBE) and earned a master's degree from Columbia University in New York.

== Early life ==
She was born on 31 July 1984, to Engineer Omar Contreras and Lidia Sosa in Bayaguana, Monte Plata. She graduated with Summa Cum Laude in Architecture from Universidad Iberoamericana (UNIBE) and is a graduate of the "La Femme Elegante" academy. She also completed a Master's degree at Columbia University in New York, where she received the Academic Excellence Award. Since 1995, she has been doing horse riding, winning the national championship award in 1996 and 1998.

== Career ==
In Miss Dominican Republic 2006, she represented the province of Barahona, placing 13th in the preliminaries. Although she failed to make the top ten, she won the special Miss Communication award. She represented Monte Plata in Miss Dominican Republic 2009, placing as first runner-up. When Miss Mundo Dominicana 2009 was canceled due to a lack of funds and sponsors, she was selected as the Dominican Republic's representative at Miss World 2009.Right now, she manages a construction company called Arco Constructora.

== See also ==
- Miss Dominican Republic 2009
- Miss Mundo Dominicana 2009
- Miss Dominican Republic 2006

Preceded by Geisha Montes de Oca	Miss Mundo Dominicana; 2009	Succeeded by Elizabeth Turra
