= Marianne Cruz =

Dominican Republic beauty pageant titleholder

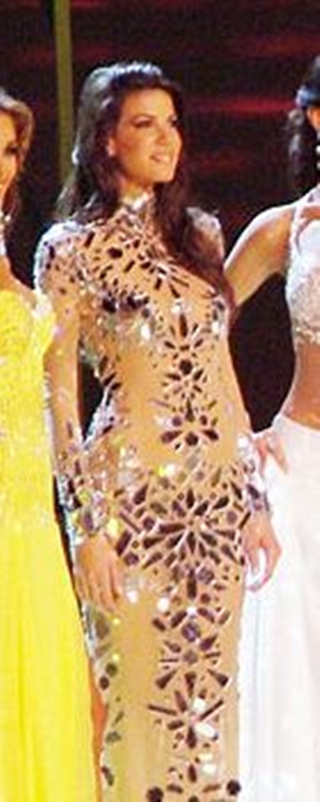
- Cruz in 2008
- Occupation: news anchor
- Beauty pageant titleholder
- Title: Miss Continente Americano 2007; Miss Dominican Republic 2008
- Major competitions: Miss Dominican Republic 2007 (1st Runner-Up); Miss Dominican Republic 2008 (Winner); (Best Face); Miss Continente Americano 2007 (Winner); Miss Universe 2008 (2nd Runner-Up)

Marianne Cruz is a Dominican beauty pageant titleholder who won Miss Dominican Republic 2008, and represented her country at Miss Universe 2008, and was second runner-up.

== Beauty Pageants ==
=== Miss Dominican Republic 2007 ===
Cruz was first runner-up at Miss Dominican Republic 2007.

=== Miss Continente Americano ===
Cruz won Miss Continente Americano 2007, and was crowned by Mia Taveras of the Dominican Republic, becoming the first Miss Continente Americano to be crowned by a compatriot.

=== Miss Dominican Republic 2008 ===
Cruz won Miss Dominican Republic 2008.

=== Miss Universe 2008 ===
Cruz represented the Dominican Republic at Miss Universe 2008, and was second runner-up. This is the third highest position Dominican Republic has gotten in Miss Universe after Ada de la Cruz (Cruz' successor) placed 1st Runner-Up at Miss Universe 2009 and Amelia Vega won Miss Universe 2003. Cruz was also the second woman representing the Dominican Republic to be second runner up (the first was Renata Soñé at 2005).

== News anchor ==
Cruz is news anchor at Noticias SIN from 2010 to 2014, and then since 2014 at AN 7. She is also radio host on “El sol de los sábados”.

Awards and achievements
Preceded by Ly Jonaitis	Miss Universe 2nd Runner-Up; 2008	Succeeded by Marigona Dragusha
Preceded by Massiel Taveras	Miss Dominican Republic; 2008	Succeeded by Ada de la Cruz
Preceded by Mía Taveras	Miss Continente Americano; 2007	Succeeded by Lupita González
Preceded by Mía Taveras	Miss Continente Americano Dominican Republic; 2007	Succeeded by Mariel Sabogal
