= Miss Dominican Republic 2009 =

- Date: 17 May 2009
- Presenters: Renata Soñé and Luis Manuel Aguiló
- Entertainment: Chronic Dancing, Issa Gadala, Angeles del Barrio, Mercedes Morales and Wason Brazoban
- Venue: Sans Souci Convention Center, Santo Domingo Este, Dominican Republic
- Broadcaster: Super Canal Caribe 211, Antena Latina & Color Visión Canal 9
- Entrants: 22
- Withdrawals: Azua, Bahoruco, Espaillat, Puerto Plata, San Juan, and Santiago Rodríguez
- Returns: Dajabón, Hato Mayor, Monte Cristi, Monte Plata, San Pedro, Sto. Dgo. Este, Sto. Dgo. Norte, and Sto. Dgo. Oeste
- Winner: Ada Aimée de la Cruz; San José de Ocoa
- Congeniality: Mariela Lucas (Com. Dom. EEUU)
- Best National Costume: Karen Figueroa (Hermanas Mirabal)
- Photogenic: Mariela Lucas (Com. Dom. EEUU)

The Miss República Dominicana 2009 was held at the Sans Souci Convention Center in Santo Domingo Este on 17 May 2009. The winner represented the Dominican Republic at Miss Universe 2009. The first runner-up entered Hispanoamericana 2009, the second runner-up entered Miss Continente Americano 2009, the third runner-up entered Miss Globe International 2010, and the fourth runner-up entered in Miss Bikini International 2010. Dayana Mendoza, Miss Universe 2008, was invited to the pageant.

== Results ==
=== Placements ===
Placement	Contestant
Miss República Dominicana 2009	San José de Ocoa – Ada de la Cruz
1st runner-up	Monte Plata – Ana Contreras
2nd runner-up	Distrito Nacional – Rocío Castellanos
3rd runner-up	San Cristóbal – Sahoni Camarena
4th runner-up	Santiago – Ana Viñas
5th runner-up	Duarte – Raengel Solís
Top 12	Valverde – Jenny Blanco; Santo Domingo Este – Esther Tejeda; La Vega – Patricia Soriano; Estados Unidos – Mariela Lucas; Santo Domingo Norte – Lussy Mejía; Peravia – Luisa Medina

== Candidates ==
Province, Community	Contestant	Age	Height	Hometown
Barahona	Lidia María Lozada Tatís	22	1.78 m (5 ft 10 in)	Santo Domingo
Com. Dom. en Estados Unidos	Mariela Lucas Veras	25	1.66 m (5 ft 5 1/4 in)	Queens
Dajabón	Arlin Rodríguez Rivas	23	1.70 m (5 ft 7 in)	Santo Domingo
Distrito Nacional	Rocío Miledis Castellanos Vargas	22	1.77 m (5 ft 9 3/4 in)	Santiago de los Caballeros
Duarte	Raengel Solís Martínez	24	1.74 m (5 ft 8 1/2 in)	Santo Domingo
Hato Mayor	Anabel del Carmen Alcántara Peña	24	1.65 m (5 ft 5 in)	Santiago de los Caballeros
Hermanas Mirabal	Karen Johana Figueroa de Lora	20	1.73 m (5 ft 8 in)	Santo Domingo
La Altagracia	Margaret Reina Mirabal Sánchez	25	1.64 m (5 ft 4 1/2 in)	Santo Domingo
La Romana	Cristina Acosta Reyes	21	1.78 m (5 ft 10 in)	Villa Hermosa
La Vega	Anna Patricia Soriano Rodríguez	23	1.71 m (5 ft 7 1/4 in)	Concepción de La Vega
Monseñor Nouel	Alicia Marina Fernández Paulino	22	1.72 m (5 ft 7 3/4 in)	Bonao
Monte Cristi	Rosa Carolina Abreu Sosa	22	1.81 m (5 ft 11 1/4 in)	San Fdo. de Monte Cristi
Monte Plata	Ana Rita Contreras Sosa	24	1.69 m (5 ft 6 1/2 in)	Bayaguana
Peravia	Luisa Viviana Medina Agramonte	19	1.79 m (5 ft 10 1/2 in)	Baní
San Cristóbal	Sahoni Yoy Camarena Victorio	23	1.75 m (5 ft 9 in)	Santo Domingo Este
San José de Ocoa	Ada Aimée de la Cruz González	22	1.83 m (6 ft 0 in)	Santo Domingo Norte
San Pedro de Macorís	Sugeidy Castíllo Peralta	18	1.83 m (6 ft 0 in)	Consuelo
Santiago	Ana Carolina Viñas Machado	24	1.83 m (6 ft 0 in)	Santiago de los Caballeros
Santo Domingo Este	Esther Tatiana Tejeda Cardona	25	1.86 m (6 ft 1 1/4 in)	Santo Domingo
Santo Domingo Norte	Lussy Margarita Mejía Durán	20	1.72 m (5 ft 7 3/4 in)	Santo Domingo Norte
Santo Domingo Oeste	Edelyn Victoriana Cedeño Peña	18	1.80 m (5 ft 10 3/4 in)	Santo Domingo
Valverde	Jenny Margarita Blanco Márquez	24	1.65 m (5 ft 5 in)	Santo Domingo
