= Eva Arias (model) =

Dominican model

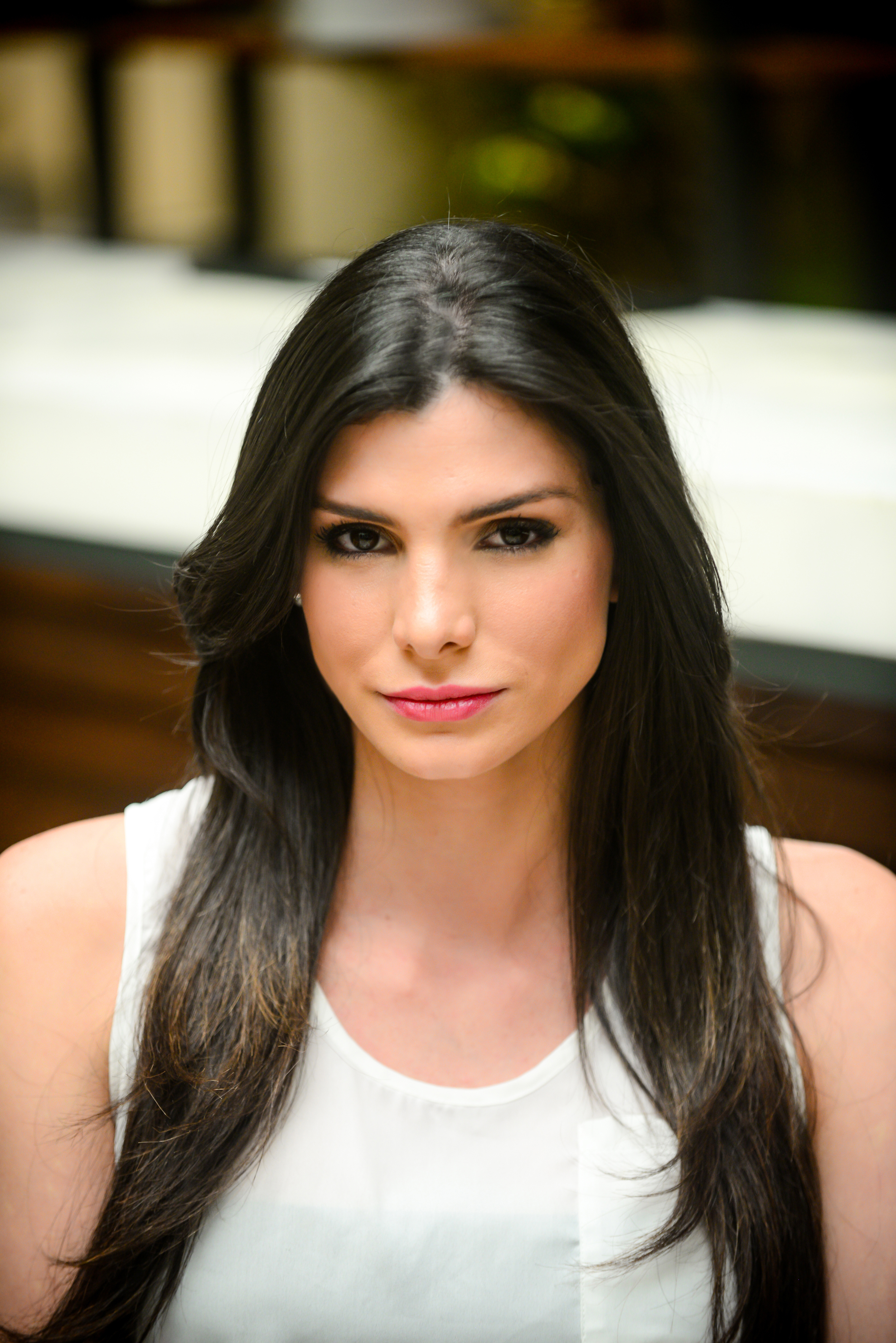
- Born: Eva Carolina Arias Viñas; April 1, 1985 (age 41); Moca, Espaillat, Dominican Republic
- Occupation: Model
- Height: 6 ft 0 in (1.83 m)
- Beauty pageant titleholder
- Title: Miss Dominican Republic 2010
- Agency: Collection Model Management
- Hair color: Brown
- Eye color: Brown
- Major competitions: Miss Dominican Republic 2006 (1st Runner-Up) (Best Fashion Look); Miss Dominican Republic 2010 (Winner); Miss Universe 2010 (Unplaced)

Eva Carolina Arias Viñas (born April 1, 1985, in Moca) is a Dominican model and beauty pageant titleholder who was crowned Miss Dominican Republic 2010 and represented her country in the 2010 Miss Universe pageant.

== Miss Dominican Republic ==
Arias participated in the Miss Dominican Republic 2006 pageant, representing Espaillat, and she placed 1st Runner-Up to Mía Taveras of Santiago and won the Best Fashion Look award.

After the pageant, Arias left her country and went on to model in Italy and several other countries for four years. She eventually came back and re-entered her country's national beauty pageant, once again representing Espaillat, and was crowned Miss Dominican Republic 2010.

== Miss Universe 2010 ==
As the official representative of her country to the 2010 Miss Universe pageant broadcast live from Las Vegas, Nevada on August 23, Arias participated as one of the 83 delegates who vied for the crown of eventual winner, Ximena Navarrete of Mexico.

Awards and achievements
Preceded by Ada de la Cruz	Miss Dominican Republic; 2010	Succeeded by Dalia Fernández
