= Joba Arriba =

Joba Arriba Jobanos, Jobarribences
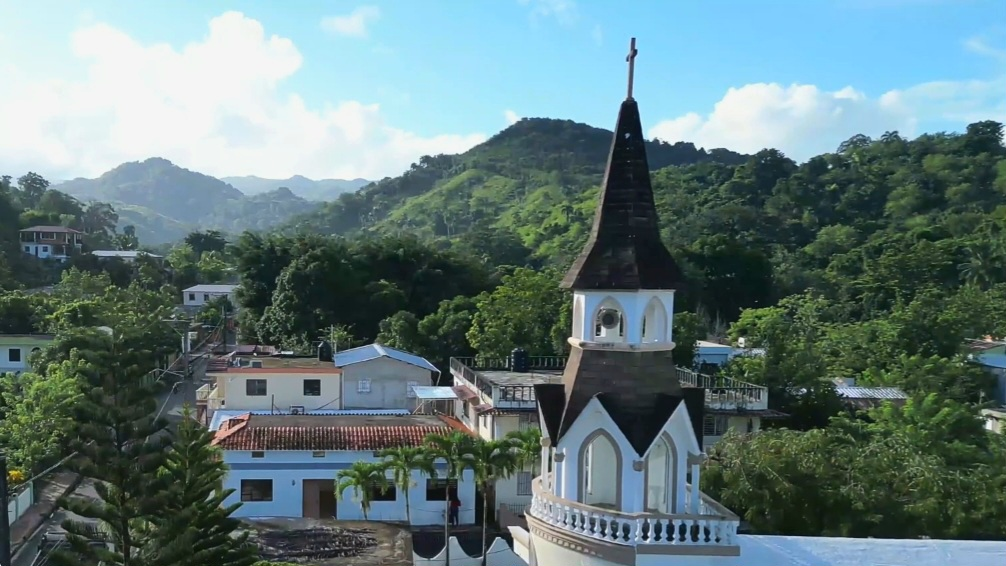
- Joba Arriba, Dominican Republic.

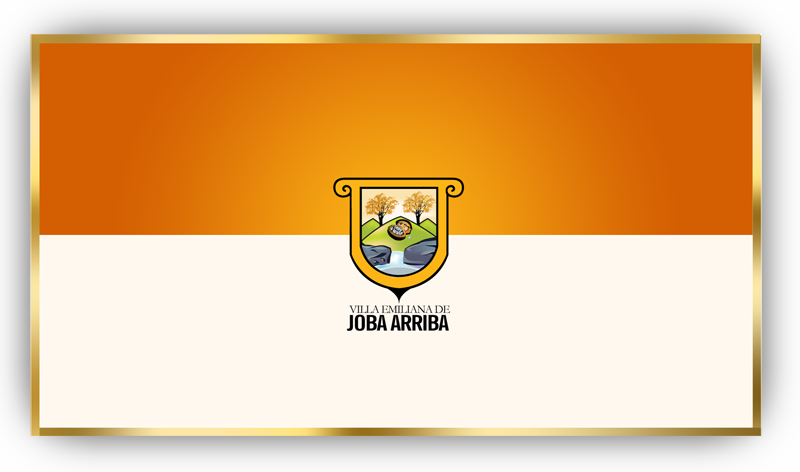
- Seal

- Location within the Dominican Republic
- Coordinates: 19°34′12″N 70°16′12″W
- Country: Dominican Republic
- Province: Espaillat

Area
  - Total: 152 km^{2} (59 sq mi)

Population (2008)
  - Total: 7,346
  - Density: 159/km^{2} (410/sq mi)
- Time zone: -6 Central Time
- Website: http://www.jobaarriba.com/

Joba Arriba is a town in the Espaillat province of the Dominican Republic. It is a municipal district of Gaspar Hernández. The town is located in the northern mountain range north of Tenares and south of Gaspar Hernández.

== Geography ==
Joba is located in the northern mountain range, on the banks of the Joba River. Thanks to the fertility of its lands, there is constant agricultural production; cocoa, coffee and other minor fruits. Cocoa being the main product. Small businesses abound (joinery workshops, mechanics, vehicle dent removal and painting, blacksmithing, upholstery workshops, supermarkets, shops, pharmacies and grocery stores.

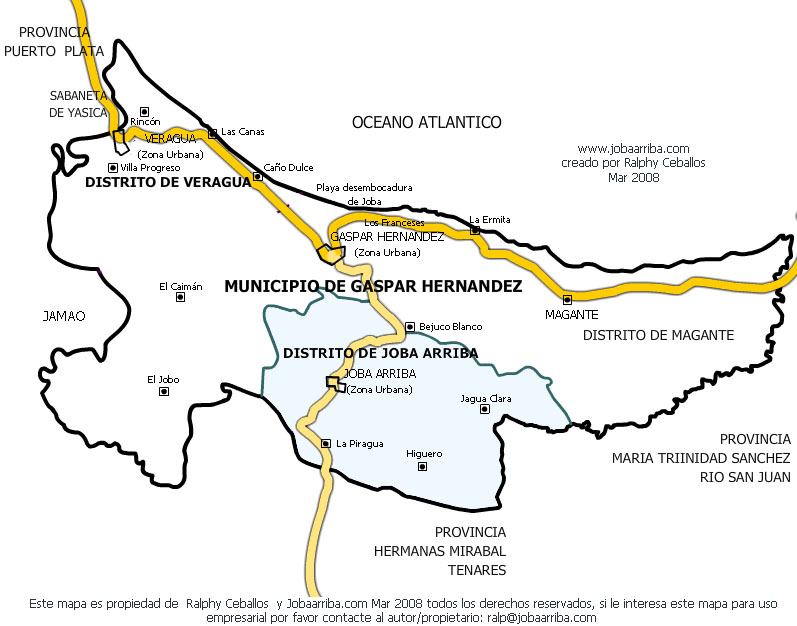
Location of Joba Arriba in the Gaspar Hernández municipality.

In Joba Arriba is the Ramón Matías Mella Cocoa Farmers Block, No. 6, of the Dominican confederation of cocoa growers CONACADO, this brings together and exports the cocoa production of the majority of producers in this area, despite the fact that there are other large producers who do their direct business with other companies such as Hacienda Rosa Amelia.

== History ==
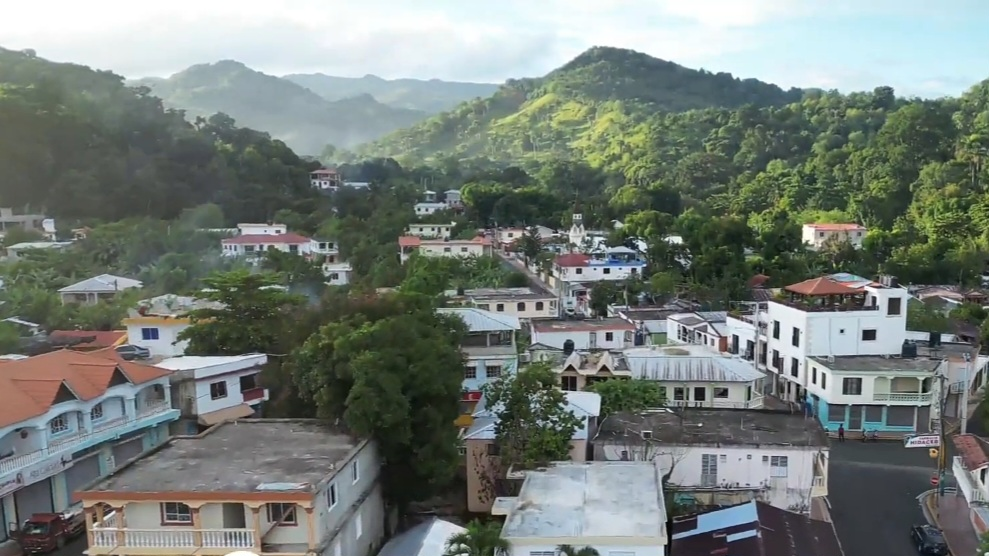
Joba Arriba town center.

The name Joba dates back to the Taino Indians, who called the river that runs through it "Joba". This town experienced a population boom in the early 1900 and was formed by people who emigrated from other cities for different reasons, among them people attracted by the fertility of the land. Joba Arriba was named a municipal district by law 4793 with an approximate population of almost 14,000 inhabitants, ready to operate in 1991.

== Infrastructure ==
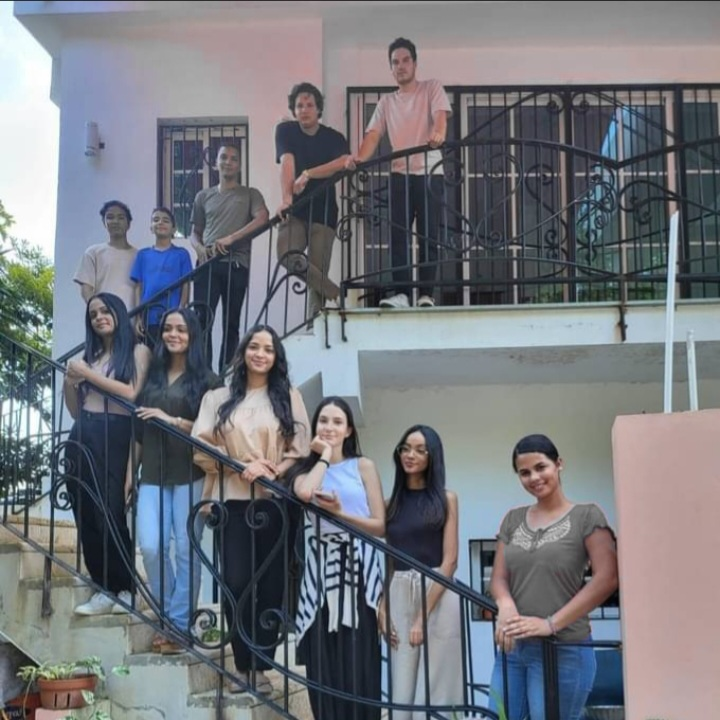
Joba Arriba, Dominican Republic.

The communication routes are: Highway 233, which connects to the north with Gaspar Hernández (11 km) and to the south with Tenares (33 km) and the highway that leads to Jagua Clara also communicates with the Duarte Province (San Francisco de Macorís) . The most fluid mobile phone signal that Joba Arriba has is that of Claro Codetel, with an antenna located on the Vereda road, this provides 3G and GSM signal for digital mobile telephony and broadband internet connection. It also has the Cable Atlántico cable television network, which offers more than 150 channels, including a local town channel.

== Education ==
In terms of education, it has a primary school that goes from preschool to 8th grade, located in the urban area and another eight distributed in the sections and areas. In addition, it has the Esteban Morales high school for secondary education. From then on, a percent of the young people who leave high school go to study in the municipality of Gaspar Hernandez or else at the nearby universities of larger towns and cities.
