= Miss Dominican Republic 2006 =

- Date: December 18, 2005
- Entertainment: Hector Acosta "El Torito"
- Venue: Palacio de los Deportes, Santo Domingo, Dominican Republic
- Broadcaster: Telemicro
- Entrants: 24
- Debuts: Com. Dom. en Estados Unidos, San José de Ocoa, Santo Domingo
- Withdrawals: Azua, Baoruco, Com. Dom. en Nueva York, Com. Dom. en Puerto Rico, Duarte
- Returns: Barahona, La Altagracia, María Trinidad Sánchez, Salcedo
- Winner: Mía Lourdes Taveras López; Santiago

The Miss República Dominicana 2006 took place on December 18, 2005. That year only 24 candidates competed for the national crown. The chosen winner represented the Dominican Republic at the Miss Universe 2006 pageant which was held in Los Angeles.

== Results ==
Final results	Contestant
Miss República Dominicana 2006	Santiago - Mía Taveras
1st Runner-up	Espaillat - Eva Arias
2nd Runner-up	Distrito Nacional - Dawilda González
3rd Runner-up	Monseñor Nouel - Marta González
4th Runner-up	Santiago Rodríguez - Elizabeth Thomas
5th Runner-up	María Trinidad Sánchez - Katia Gutiérrez
Top 12 Semi-Finalists	Santo Domingo - Paola Torres; La Vega - Aimeé Durán; Puerto Plata - Hismelda Upia; Valverde - Nathalie Espinal Torres; La Altagracia - Aimeé Melo; La Romana - Tania Medina

== Delegates ==
Province, Community	Contestant	Age	Height	Hometown
Barahona	Ana Rita Contreras Sosa	21	1.69 m (5 ft 6 1/2 in)	Bayaguana
Com. Dom. en Estados Unidos	Massiel Hernández Adames	20	1.67 m (5 ft 5 3/4 in)	Philadelphia
Distrito Nacional	Dawilda González Cid	22	1.81 m (5 ft 11 1/4 in)	Santo Domingo)^{[note 1]}
Espaillat	Eva Carolina Arias Viñas	20	1.82 m (5 ft 11 3/4 in)	Moca
La Altagracia	Aimeé Elaine Melo Hernández	21	1.73 m (5 ft 8 in)	Santo Domingo
La Romana	Tania Yolanda Medina Collado	23	1.65 m (5 ft 5 in)	La Romana
La Vega	Aimeé Carolina Durán Rodríguez	19	1.78 m (5 ft 10 in)	Concepción de La Vega
María Trinidad Sánchez	Katia Gutiérrez Balbuena	21	1.75 m (5 ft 9 in)	Río San Juan
Monseñor Nouel	Marta Henriqueta González	22	1.77 m (5 ft 9 3/4 in)	Bonao
Monte Cristi	Anibelka Clase Jiménez	23	1.78 m (5 ft 10 in)	Santo Domingo
Monte Plata	Mariela Joselin Rosario Jiménez	24	1.86 m (6 ft 1 1/4 in)	Santo Domingo
Puerto Plata	Hismelda Margarita Upia de Rosario	22	1.82 m (5 ft 11 3/4 in)	San Felipe de Puerto Plata
Salcedo	Dawelly Domínguez Hernández	18	1.76 m (5 ft 9 1/4 in)	Santo Domingo
San Cristóbal	Yohana Martínez Castro	18	1.79 m (5 ft 10 1/2 in)	San Cristóbal
San José de Ocoa	Lila del Carmen León Guzmán	19	1.74 m (5 ft 8 1/2 in)	San José de Ocoa
San Juan	Kadulis Oviedo Merán	20	1.81 m (5 ft 11 1/4 in)	Santo Domingo
San Pedro de Macorís	Arianna Labrada Cepeda	20	1.72 m (5 ft 7 3/4 in)	San Pedro de Macorís
Santiago	Mía Lourdes Taveras López	19	1.82 m (5 ft 11 3/4 in)	Santiago de los Caballeros
Santiago Rodríguez	Elizabeth Thomas	17	1.75 m (5 ft 9 in)	San Ignacio de Sabaneta
Santo Domingo	Paola María Torres Cohén	20	1.71 m (5 ft 7 1/4 in)	Santiago de los Caballeros
Valverde	Nathalie Espinal Torres	20	1.73 m (5 ft 8 in)	Santiago Rodriguez

- * Withdrew
- ** Had Accident
- *** Disqualified

^{note 1} Dawilda was born and raised in Hato Mayor del Rey but she went to the capital to go to college at Autonomous University of Santo Domingo.
