= Los Ríos, Dominican Republic =

Coordinates: 18°31′19″N 71°35′24″W

- Interactive map of Los Ríos, Dominican Republic
- Country: Dominican Republic
- Province: Baoruco

Area
  - Total: 149.87 km^{2} (57.87 sq mi)

Population (2012)
  - Total: 9,963
  - Density: 66.48/km^{2} (172.2/sq mi)

Los Ríos, Dominican Republic is a town in the Baoruco province of the Dominican Republic.

== Sources ==
- – World-Gazetteer.com
