= Miss Dominican Republic 2008 =

- Date: December 3, 2007
- Venue: Estudio de Canal 7, Santo Domingo, Dominican Republic
- Broadcaster: Dominican TV, Antena Latina 7
- Entrants: 9
- Debuts: Salcedo (as Hermanas Mirabal)
- Returns: Espaillat
- Winner: Marianne Elizabeth Cruz González; Hermanas Mirabal
- Congeniality: Katherine Escaño; Monseñor Nouel
- Best National Costume: Yaritza Camacho; Espaillat
- Photogenic: Yaritza Camacho; Espaillat

Miss República Dominicana 2008 pageant was held on December 3, 2007. That year nine candidates competed for the national crown. The chosen winner represented the Dominican Republic at Miss Universe 2008. The first runner up entered in Reina Hispanoamericana 2008. The second runner up entered in Miss Continente Americano 2008. The third runner up entered in Miss Caribbean 2009. The fourth runner up entered in Miss Global Cities 2008. The fifth runner up entered in Miss Globe International 2008. The sixth runner up entered in Miss Bikini International 2009. The seventh runner up entered in Miss Asia Pacific 2009. The eight runner up entered in Miss Leisure 2009.

== Results ==
Final results	Contestant
Miss República Dominicana 2008	Hermanas Mirabal - Marianne Cruz
1st Runner-up	La Romana - Mariel Sabogal
2nd Runner-up	Distrito Nacional - Yadira Geara
Finalist	Espaillat - Yaritza Camacho; Puerto Plata - Eliana Santana; Com. Dom. EEUU - Jennifer Peña; Duarte - Adriana Rosal; Santo Domingo - Claudia García; Monseñor Nouel - Katherine Escaño

== Delegates ==
Province, Community	Contestant	Age	Height	Hometown
Com. Dom. EU	Jennifer Amaris Peña García	23	1.81 m (5 ft 11 1/4 in)	Hartford
Distrito Nacional	Yadira Rossina Geara Cury	22	1.86 m (6 ft 1 1/4 in)	Santo Domingo
Duarte	Adriana Rossal Hidalgo	19	1.79 m (5 ft 10 1/2 in)	San Francisco de Macorís
Espaillat	Yaritza Camacho Camacho	20	1.81 m (5 ft 11 1/4 in)	Moca
Hermanas Mirabal	Marianne Elizabeth Cruz González	23	1.82 m (5 ft 11 3/4 in)	Salcedo
La Romana	Mariel Isabel Sabogal Cruz	22	1.80 m (5 ft 10 3/4 in)	La Romana
Monseñor Nouel	Katherine Miguelina Escaño Cabrera	20	1.78 m (5 ft 10 in)	Bonao
Puerto Plata	Eliana Alexandra Santana Arias	18	1.85 m (6 ft 3/4 in)	San Felipe de Puerto Plata
Santo Domingo	Claudia Marie García Vidal	18	1.80 m (5 ft 10 3/4 in)	Santo Domingo Norte
