= San Víctor =

- Coat of arms

- Location within the Dominican Republic
- Coordinates: 19°27′00″N 70°31′48″W
- Country: Dominican Republic
- Province: Espaillat
- established as a municipality: May 23, 2013

Area
  - Total: 99.85 km^{2} (38.55 sq mi)

Population (2012)
  - Total: 79,851
  - Density: 799.7/km^{2} (2,071/sq mi)
- Time zone: -4 UTC

San Víctor is a municipality (municipio) of the Espaillat Province in the Dominican Republic. The District Municipality became a municipality on May 23, 2013.

As of the 2012 census estimate, the municipality, then a municipal district of the Moca municipality, had 79,851 inhabitants; 32,501 living in the city itself, and 47,350 in its rural districts (secciones).
