= Villa Jaragua =

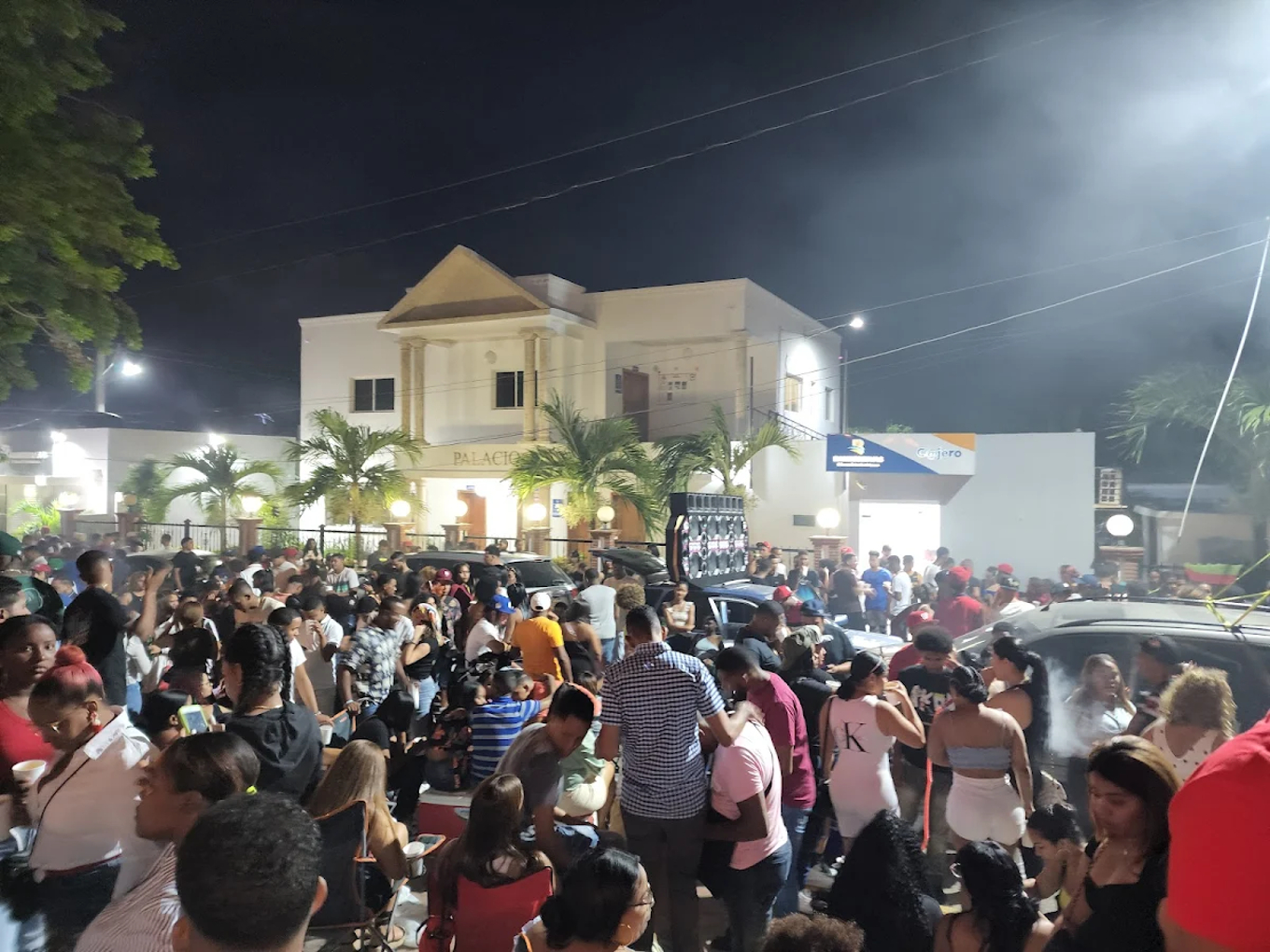
- People gathered in town hall of Villa Jaragua

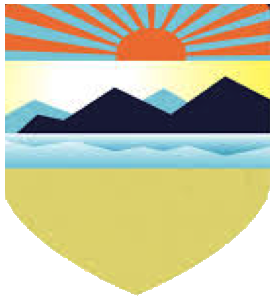
- Coat of arms

- Location within the Dominican Republic
- Coordinates: 18°28′48″N 71°30′0″W
- Country: Dominican Republic
- Province: Bahoruco
- Municipality since: 1974

Area
  - Total: 120.23 km^{2} (46.42 sq mi)

Population (2012)
  - Total: 13,562
  - Density: 112.80/km^{2} (292.15/sq mi)
- Municipal Districts: 0

Villa Jaragua is a town and a municipality in the Bahoruco province of the Dominican Republic, close to the Lake Enriquillo.

The town was known as Barbacoa but Trujillo named it as Villa Trujillo Valdéz after his father. In 1961, its name was changed to the present one, Villa Jaragua.

== History ==
The foundation of Jaragua dates back to the end of the 19th century, in 1883, when the Rivas, Méndez, Trinidad and Díaz families arrived from Azua. The Méndez and Trinidad settled on the western side of the stream and the Rivas and Díaz settled on the eastern side.

In this area of the Southwest was the route to Haiti, which had a row of mangoes born naturally from the town of Galván (Cambronal) until entering Haitian territory. Many of those mangoes were ancient trees. In the course of that natural row of mangoes there are many furnias or small water sources and three gorges, which are water sources with greater flow and volume than the furnias. Those cachones are Pocilga, Cachón en Medio and Cachón Mamey.

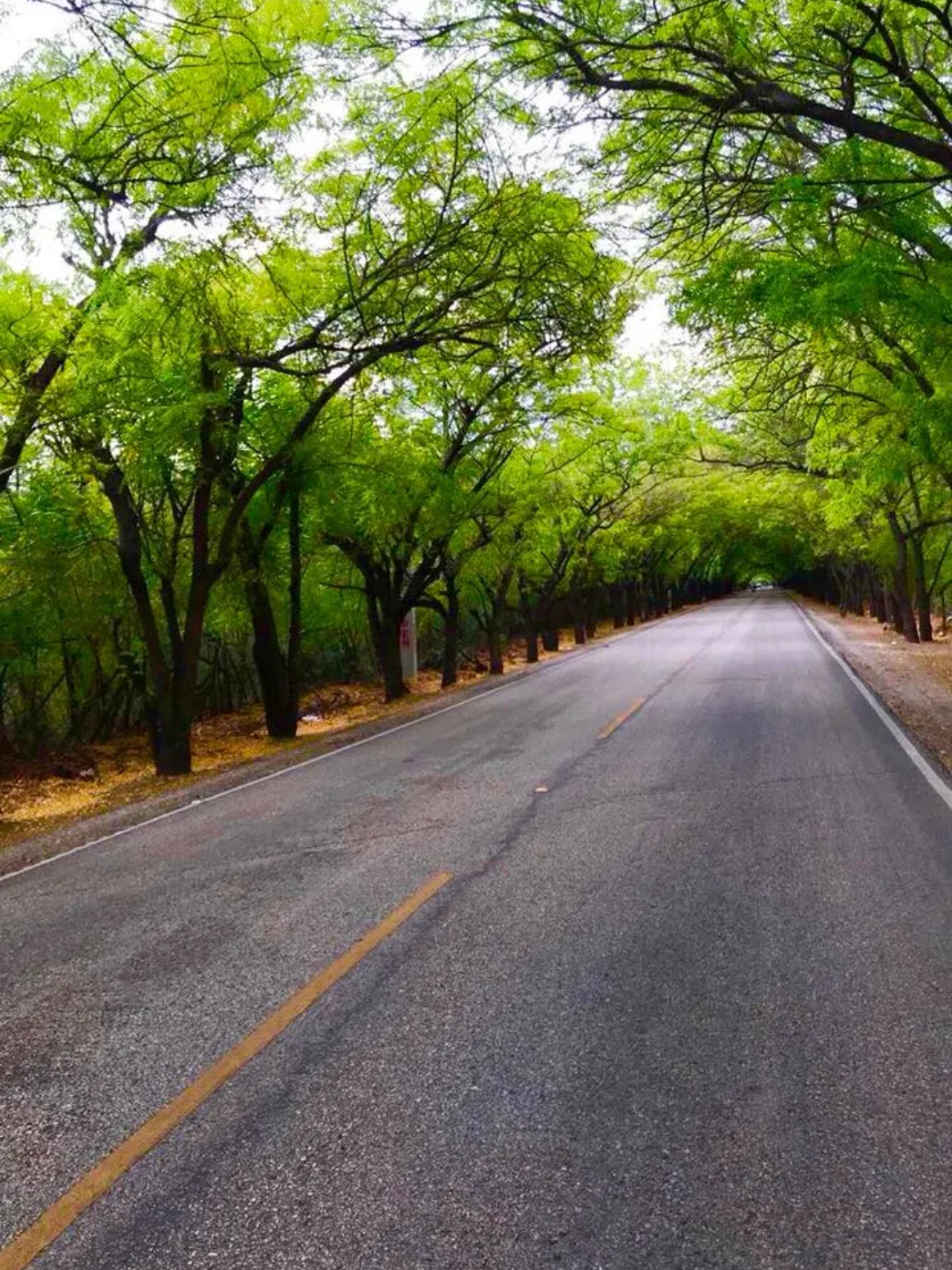
Natural tunnel in Villa Jaragua.

At the beginning of the 20th century, a seismic movement was recorded that sank a part of the land in the lower part of Jaragua, next to the cachones, which caused its inhabitants to move towards the upper part of the community. In those same years, the dynamic commercial exchange between the jaragüenses and the sanjuaneros was carried out, who used El Hierro, adjacent to El Cercado, as a bridge.

In its beginnings, Jaragua was called Barbacoa and, later on, it was named Villa José Trujillo Valdez, a name imposed by the Tyrant Rafael Leónidas Trujillo or his followers in honor of his father.

On August 22, 1943, the community was elevated to a Municipal District with the name of Villa José Trujillo Valdez and, in 1963, by decision of the aldermen, its name was changed, being called from that moment Jaragua, in honor of the cacicazgo that it had. that name at the time of the indigenous people. And then in the 20th century, for an honor of the rivas, one of the fathers of rivas called Angel Rafael Rivas was then found out and made a crowd in the eastern side of villa jaragua park. and then 2020 inrodusing the theme park games in the eastern side of villa jaragua some of the names are " el barco, and estrellita" made their way to saturday-sunday it will be crowded for the kids and aldults going in the games.
