= Miss Mundo Dominicana 2012 =

- Date: June 11, 2012
- Venue: Santiago de los Caballeros, Dominican Republic
- Entrants: 1
- Winner: Sally Lucía Aponte Tejada; Hermanas Mirabal

The Miss Mundo Dominicana 2012 was hand-picked by the Organization of Miss International Dominican Republic and the franchiser responsible to send a Dominican representative to the Miss World 2012 beauty pageant. Miss Dominican Republic 2011 semifinalist Saly Lucía Aponte Tejada from Salcedo, Hermanas Mirabal was hand-picked after the original Miss Mundo Dominicana 2012, Jenny Blanco, was disqualified for being over the age limit for Miss World. Reina Nacional de Belleza 2012 will be held in October 2012 and then will send the winner to Miss International 2012. The Miss Mundo Dominicana 2012 is 20 years old and has a height of 5'10". Saly Aponte is a current student Universidad Autónoma de Santo Domingo majoring in Economics.

== Results ==
Final results	Contestant
Miss Mundo Dominicana 2012	Hermanas Mirabal - Sally Aponte
