= Jenny Blanco =

Dominican actress

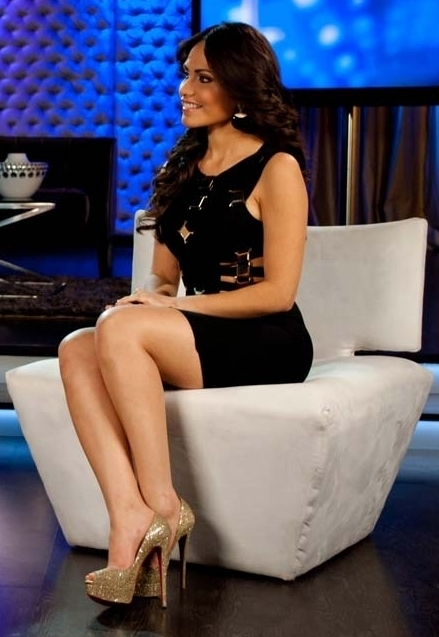
- Born: Jenny Margarita Blanco Márquez; 29 April 1985 (age 41); Santo Domingo, Dominican Republic
- Occupations: Actress, Model, TV Host
- Height: 1.68 m (5 ft 6 in)
- Beauty pageant titleholder
- Title: Miss Mundo Dominicana 2012
- Years active: 2006–present
- Hair color: Brown
- Eye color: Green
- Major competitions: Miss Dominican Republic 2009 (Semifinalist); Miss Mundo Dominicana 2012 (Winner); Miss World 2012 (Unplaced)
- Website: www.jennyblanco.com FaceBook; Jenny Blanco on X

Jenny Margarita Blanco Márquez (born 29 April 1985) is a Dominican actress, television host, model and beauty pageant titleholder who was crowned Miss Mundo Dominicana 2012.

== Pageants ==
=== Miss Dominican Republic 2009 ===
Blanco competed at the Miss Dominican Republic 2009 pageant representing the Valverde Province, where she finished in the semifinals.

=== Miss World Dominican Republic 2012 ===
Blanco was crowned Miss Mundo Dominicana 2012 at the Gran Arena del Cibao in Santiago de los Caballeros during the Dominican Republic Fashion Week. She was scheduled to represent her country at the Miss World 2012 pageant on 18 August 2012, in Ordos, China, but was disqualified for exceeding the age limit. She was replaced by Sally Aponte.

== Career ==
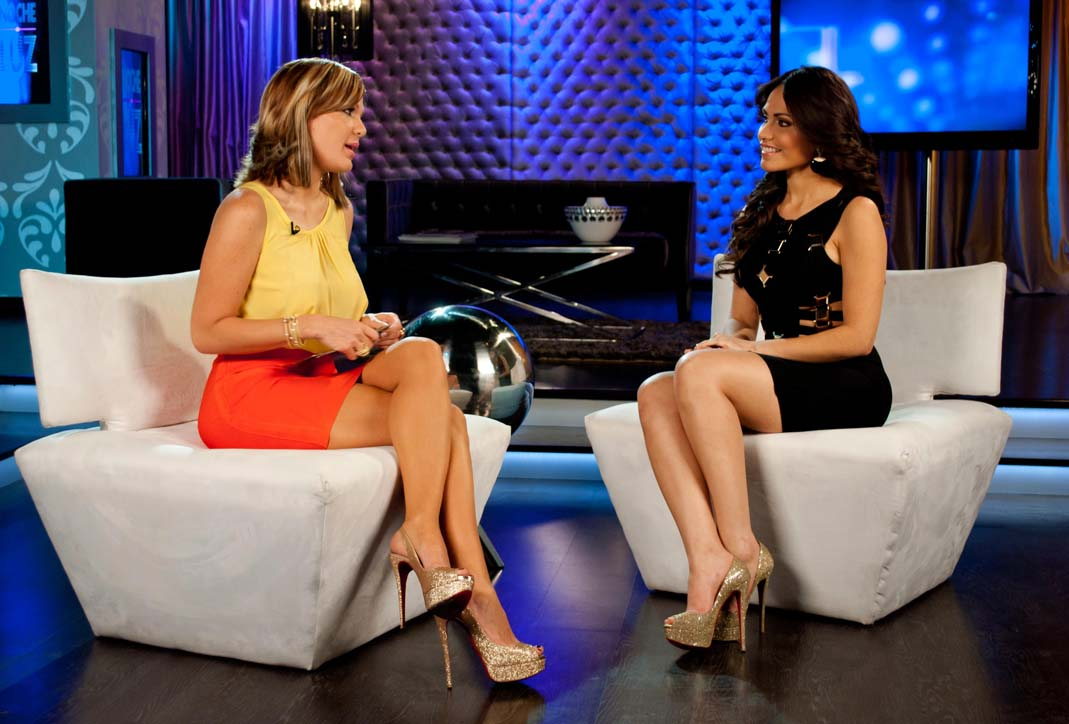
Luz García and Jenny Blanco (April 2012)

Blanco is a television host for the Telemicro media group.

In 2012, she was selected by Luz García's Noche de Luz programme as a "Summer’s Hot Body".

In 2014, she stopped hosting De extremo a extremo, the programme that had established her as a major television personality. On 6 June 2014, she began hosting the Saturday programme Sábado extraordinario on Telemicro.

=== Filmography ===
Year	Title	Character	Director	Country
2013	Quiero Ser Fiel	Lisa	—N/a	(Dominican Republic)
2021	No es lo que parece	Juanma's sister	David Maler	(Dominican Republic)

Awards and achievements	Miss Mundo Dominicana (Disqualified); 2012
