= Tania Medina =

Dominican beauty pageant contestant (born 1982)

- Born: Tania Yolanda Medina Collado; La Romana, La Romana, Dominican Republic
- Height: 5 ft 6 in (1.68 m)
- Beauty pageant titleholder
- Hair color: Black
- Eye color: Hazel
- Major competitions: Miss Dominican Republic 2006 (7th place); Miss Mundo Dominicana 2006 (2nd runner up)

Tania Yolanda Medina Collado is a plastic surgeon, host, writer, and ex-beauty queen from the Dominican Republic. In March 2022, she was included in People en Español magazine's list of the 25 most powerful women.

== Biography ==
=== Beauty contests and modeling ===
Medina participated in Miss Dominican Republic US in 2000 and in Miss Millennium Universe, representing the Dominican Republic, in 2001. The same year she participated in Miss American Continent, where she was first runner-up. In 2006 she participated in Miss Dominican Republic, representing La Romana. She became a semifinalist and became in the seventh position. The same year, she entered Miss Mundo Dominicana 2006, where he finished in third position.

She has participated in numerous television programs in media such as Univisión, Telemundo, People, among others. In addition, she has appeared on the covers or in the pages of magazines such as Harper's Bazaar, Glamour, L'Officiel and Elle. In 2022 she presented her first book, entitled La belleza de amarme.

=== Medical career ===
She studied medicine at the School of Medicine of the Technological Institute of Santo Domingo (INTEC). She graduated as a specialist from the National Residency in Aesthetic and Reconstructive Plastic Surgery at the Dr. Salvador Gautier Hospital.

She is a member of the Dominican Medical Association and a candidate member of the Dominican Society of Plastic, Reconstructive and Aesthetic Surgery (SODOCIPRE). She is also part of the Staff of National Private Aesthetic Plastic Surgeons, Reconstructive.

== Personal life ==
Medina was previously married to Pablo García, a general surgeon, in 2007. The couple had four children: Daniella, Letizia, Paula and Pablo. Dr. Tania Medina is currently single.
