= Yendi Phillipps =

Jamaican TV host, model and beauty queen (born 1985)

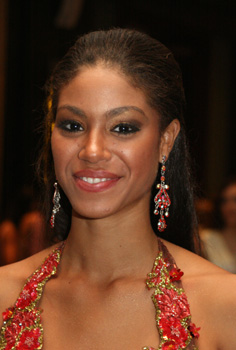
- Born: 8 September 1985 (age 41); Kingston, Jamaica
- Height: 5 ft 10 in (1.78 m)
- Beauty pageant titleholder
- Title: Miss Jamaica World 2007; Miss Jamaica Universe 2010
- Hair color: Brown
- Eye color: Brown
- Major competitions: Miss Jamaica World 2007 (Winner); Miss World 2007 (Top 16); Miss Jamaica Universe 2010 (Winner); Miss Universe 2010 (1st Runner-Up)

Yendi Amira Phillipps (born 8 September 1985) is a Jamaican of Afro-European heritage, model and beauty pageant titleholder who was crowned Miss Jamaica World 2007 as well as the Miss Jamaica Universe 2010 pageant. She represented Jamaica at Miss World 2007 held in Sanya, China and then later at Miss Universe 2010 held at the Mandalay Bay Resort and Casino in Las Vegas, U.S. on 23 August 2010 where she finished as the first runner up. After Miss Universe, Phillipps appeared in commercials for brands such as Toyota.

== Miss World 2007 ==
She placed in Miss World Beach Beauty, Miss World Sports, Miss World Talent, Miss World Top Model and the Beauty With A Purpose Award. The Jamaican beauty made Miss World history and was the first contestant to ever place in all of the fast track events listed above. During the telecast, she made the final top 16.

== Miss Universe 2010 ==
She was crowned Miss Jamaica Universe 2010 on 3 July 2010, and represented Jamaica at the Miss Universe 2010 pageant in Las Vegas on 23 August 2010, run by Donald Trump. Phillipps scored the highest in swimsuit and came in second in evening gown, entering the final question round in second place with a score of 8.884. She became the first runner up behind Mexico.

She is one of only nine former Miss World semifinalists to place in the Miss Universe semifinals, the others being Michelle McLean of Namibia in 1992, compatriot Christine Straw of Jamaica in 2004, Ada de la Cruz of the Dominican Republic in 2009, Patricia Yurena Rodríguez of Spain in 2013, Olivia Jordan of the USA in 2015, Catriona Gray of the Philippines in 2018, and Julia Gama of Brazil and Andrea Meza of Mexico, both in 2020 (coincidentally Phillipps, de la Cruz, Rodriguez, and Gama all finished as 1st Runner-Up).

=== 2010–present: After Miss Universe ===
Phillipps currently holds a Bachelor of Fine Arts degree with a concentration in dance from The College at Brockport, State University of New York and a Master's degree in Recreation and Leisure Management. After the Miss Universe pageant, Phillipps appeared in an American ad campaign for the car brand Toyota. Phillipps has also appeared in commercials for Pepsi Refresh in the US and the Sprite campaign in India. Yendi Phillipps has also appeared in publications such as Skywritings magazine, Caribbean Beat magazine, Woman & Home, Fair Lady, Buzz, Collage, Soul, Basia and Ocean Style. Phillipps has also hosted Digicel Rising Stars. On 22 April 2012, Yendi announced via her Facebook fan page that she was pregnant. On 21 September 2012, she gave birth to a 7-pound, 11-ounce baby girl named Israel.

== Personal life ==
In August 2022, she married businessman Omar McFarlane in a private ceremony in Florida. She has a daughter from a previous relationship with dancehall artiste Daniel 'Chino' McGregor.

In November 2023, she gave birth to their son, making this the first child for the couple.

Awards and achievements
Preceded by (Dominican Republic) Ada de la Cruz	Miss Universe 1st Runner-Up; 2010	Succeeded by (Ukraine) Olesya Stefanko
Preceded by Carolyn Yapp	Miss Jamaica Universe; 2010	Succeeded by Shakira Martin
