= Massiel Taveras =

Dominican beauty pageant titleholder

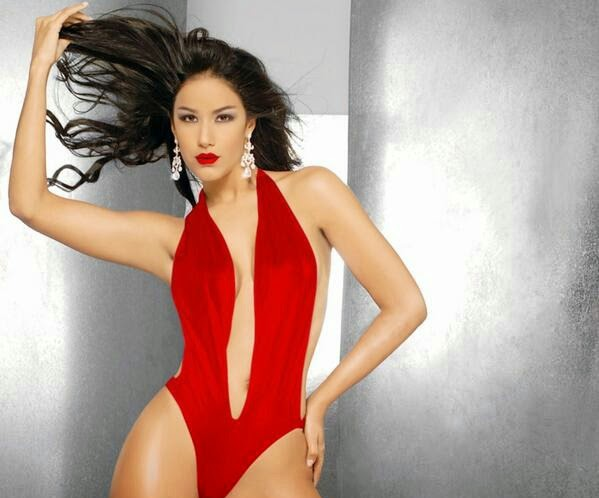
- Born: Massiel Indira Taveras Henríquez; 7 July 1984 (age 42); Santiago de los Caballeros, Dominican Republic
- Education: Universidad APEC
- Occupations: presenter, designer, actress, model
- Title: Miss Dominican Republic 2007; Reina Hispanoamericana 2007

Massiel Indira Taveras Henríquez (born 7 July 1984) is a Dominican television host, designer, actress and beauty pageant titleholder who was crowned Miss Dominican Republic 2007 and represented her country at Miss Universe 2007.

== Career ==
In 2024, she was accosted by a security guard on the red carpet while attending a film premiere at 2024 Cannes Film Festival.

== Personal life ==
Born in Santiago de los Caballeros, Massiel is daughter of Damían Taveras and Carmen Henríquez de Taveras. She has six siblings, among them, the conductor of television and ex- queen of beauty Rita Isaura Taveras. She is a graduate of Pontificia Universidad Católica Madre y Maestra. Massiel Taveras moved to Hollywood to pursue acting.

== Pageant participation ==
=== Miss Dominican Republic 2007 ===
Taveras competed at Miss Dominican Republic 2007 on March 22, 2007, representing Santiago, where she was crowned the winner by Mía Taveras (her cousin).

=== Miss Universe 2007 ===
Massiel competed at the Miss Universe 2007 pageant on May 28, 2007 in Mexico City. Although among of the favorites Taveras did not place.

=== Reina Hispanoamericana 2007 ===
On October 26 Taveras was crowned Reina Hispanoamericana 2007 during an event held in Santa Cruz, Bolivia; she also won the most beautiful face award and best figure award.

== Sources ==
- Masiel Taveras (Photo)

Awards and achievements
Preceded by (Brazil) Francine Eickemberg	Reina Hispanoamericana; 2007	Succeeded by (Mexico) Laura Zúñiga (Dethroned) (Brazil) Vivian Noronha (Successor)
Preceded by Mía Taveras	Miss Dominican Republic; 2007	Succeeded by Marianne Cruz
Preceded by Mía Taveras	Miss Santiago; 2007	Succeeded by Ana Viñas
