= Villa Magante =

Coordinates: 19.611°N 70.175°W

Villa Magante, created in 2006 by the national Congress, is the fastest growing municipal district in Espaillat Province, Dominican Republic.

Sub-districts of Villa Magante include the Urban Zone (consisting of the La Yagua neighborhood), Vereda al Medio, La Cantera, Las Tres Ceibas, and Magante. The district also includes Rogelio Beach, Magante Beach, Esmeral Bay, Puerto Escondido, and Michijo Point. It is administered by a trustee (president of the district committee) and three aldermen.
