= Miss Dominican Republic 2007 =

- Date: March 22, 2007
- Entertainment: Johnny Ventura, Mía Taveras
- Venue: Hotel Jaragua, Santo Domingo, Dominican Republic
- Broadcaster: Super Canal 33/Super Canal Caribe
- Entrants: 20
- Withdrawals: Distrito Nacional, Independencia, Monseñor Nouel, Monte Cristi, Pedernales, Puerto Plata
- Returns: Baoruco, Duarte, Peravia, Sánchez Ramírez
- Winner: Massiel Indira Taveras Henríquez; Santiago

The Miss Dominican Republic 2007 pageant was held on March 22, 2007. That year 20 candidates competed for the national crown. The chosen winner represented the Dominican Republic at the Miss Universe 2007 pageant which was held in Mexico and at Reina Hispanoamericana 2007 pageant which was held in Bolivia. The First Runner Up went to Mrs. Continente Americano 2007 pageant which was held in Ecuador.

== Results ==
Final results	Contestant
Miss República Dominicana 2007	Santiago - Massiel Taveras
1st Runner-up	Salcedo - Marianne Cruz
2nd Runner-up	La Altagracia - Yanna Montás
3rd Runner-up	Duarte - Sheila Ynoa
4th Runner-up	Sánchez Ramírez -Yesenia Aybar
Semi-finalists	Barahona -Desireé Álvarez; San Cristóbal - Ada de la Cruz; Com. Dom. En Estados Unidos - Sarah Rivera; Santiago Rodríguez - Arlette Rodríguez; Azua -Odra Nova

== Delegates ==
Province, Community	Contestant	Age	Height	Hometown
Azua	Odra Nova Vizcaino	22	1.69 m (5 ft 6 1/2 in)	Azua de Compostela
Bahoruco	Liza Fortunato Reyes	19	1.75 m (5 ft 9 in)	Neiba
Barahona	Desireé Álvarez Lama	21	1.78 m (5 ft 10 in)	Santa Cruz de Barahona
Com. Dom. En Estados Unidos	Sarah Carlota Rivera Heredia	21	1.81 m (5 ft 11 1/4 in)	New York
Duarte	Sheila Ynoa García	20	1.74 m (5 ft 8 1/2 in)	San Francisco de Macorís
La Altagracia	Yanna Nofred Montás Santana	20	1.77 m (5 ft 9 3/4 in)	Salvaleón de Higüey
La Romana	Anna Radelís Languasco Osorio	18	1.68 m (5 ft 6 1/4 in)	Santo Domingo
La Vega	Nathaly Matos Súarez	20	1.81 m (5 ft 11 1/4 in)	Santiago de los Caballeros
Monseñor Nouel	Claudia Mabel Peña Gómez**	19	1.82 m (5 ft 11 3/4 in)	Bonao
Peravia	Rosanny Medina Tejeda	21	1.83 m (6 ft 0 in)	Baní
Puerto Plata	Ioanna María Giouzeppos Roman**	19	1.84 m (6 ft 1/2 in)	San Felipe de Puerto Plata
Salcedo	Marianne Elizabeth Cruz González	21	1.82 m (5 ft 11 3/4 in)	Salcedo
Sánchez Ramírez	Yessenia Mercedes Aybar Galvez	23	1.81 m (5 ft 11 1/4 in)	Cotuí
San Cristóbal	Ada Aimée de la Cruz González	20	1.83 m (6 ft 0 in)	Villa Mella
San José de Ocoa	Vilma Vega Báez	19	1.75 m (5 ft 9 in)	Santiago de los Caballeros
San Juan	Elizabeth García Núñez	24	1.78 m (5 ft 10 in)	Santiago de los Caballeros
Santiago	Massiel Indhira Taveras Henríquez	22	1.74 m (5 ft 8 1/2 in)	Santiago de los Caballeros
Santiago Rodríguez	Arlette Mabel Rodríguez	18	1.76 m (5 ft 9 1/4 in)	San Ignacio de Sabaneta
Santo Domingo	Alexandra González de Jesus	23	1.72 m (5 ft 7 3/4 in)	Santo Domingo Este
Valverde	Yonoris Marizán Araujo	20	1.76 m (5 ft 9 1/4 in)	Santa Cruz de Mao

- *Withdrew
