= Gaspar Hernández =

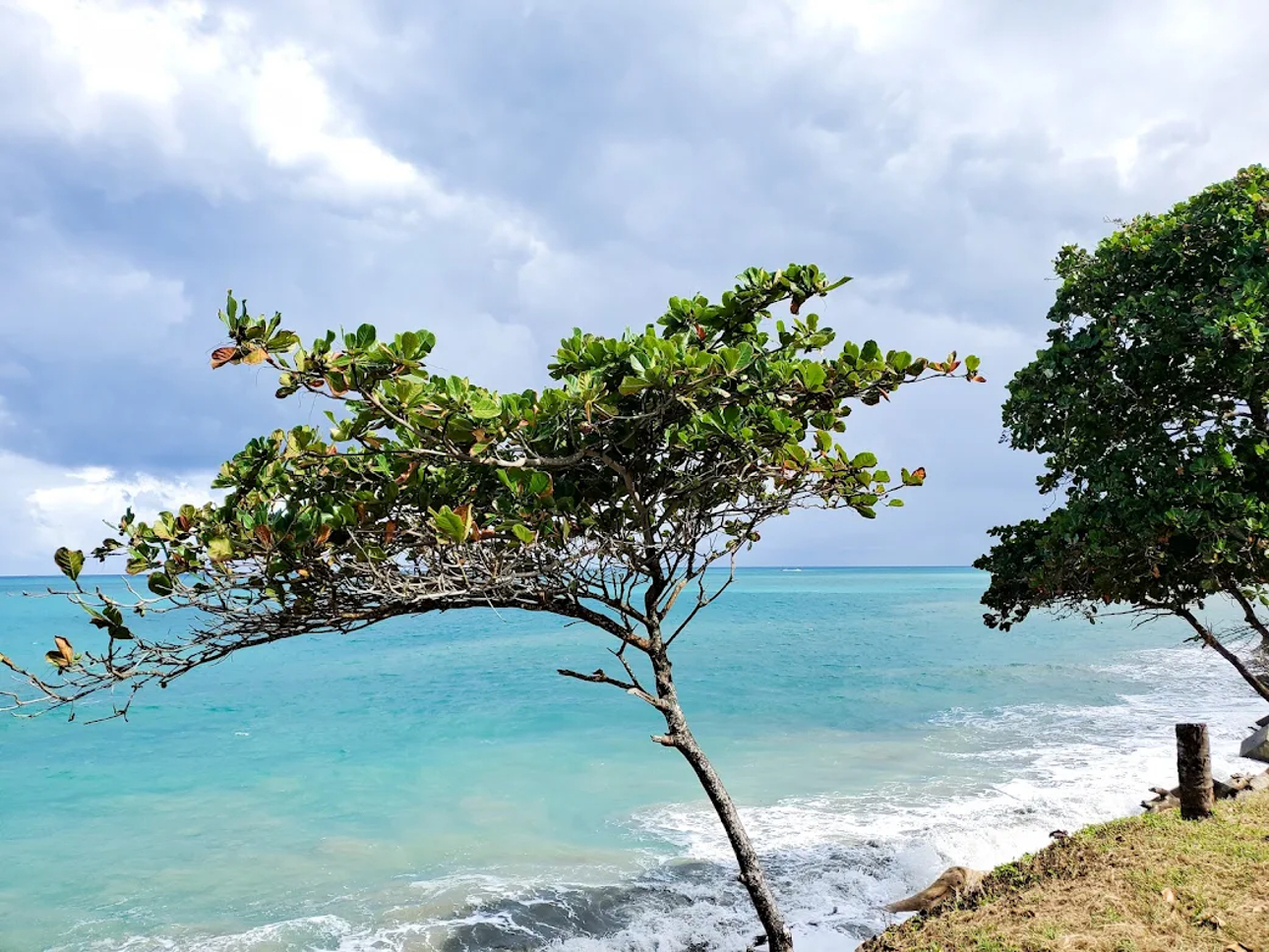

- Location within the Dominican Republic
- Coordinates: 19°37′12″N 70°16′48″W
- Country: Dominican Republic
- Province: Espaillat
- Municipality since: 1907

Area
  - Total: 366.18 km^{2} (141.38 sq mi)
- Elevation: 10 m (33 ft)

Population (2012)
  - Total: 57,302
  - Density: 156.49/km^{2} (405.30/sq mi)
  - Urban: 37,852
- Distance to – Moca: 64 km
- Municipalities: 3

Gaspar Hernández is a small city in Espaillat province on the North Coast Dominican Republic.

Gaspar Hernandez exhibits characteristics typical of towns in the region. While there is some indirect economic activity related to tourism, the local economy is primarily based on cattle farming and agriculture.

== History ==
The current site of Gaspar Hernández retains features of indigenous culture, mainly of the Ciguayo and Ciboney Indians from the societies of Río San Juan, Nagua and Samana.

The present municipality was founded on April 5, 1907, in a place originally called Canto La Ermita. At that time the population was concentrated on the banks of the river Joba. The place was renamed in honor of the Peruvian priest, Gaspar Hernández, an associate of Juan Pablo Duarte and a advent supporter of the Dominican War of Independence.

== Climate ==
Climate data for Gaspar Hernández (1961–1990)
Month	Jan	Feb	Mar	Apr	May	Jun	Jul	Aug	Sep	Oct	Nov	Dec	Year
Record high °C (°F)	34.0 (93.2)	34.0 (93.2)	35.8 (96.4)	35.4 (95.7)	37.8 (100.0)	38.0 (100.4)	36.6 (97.9)	38.9 (102.0)	37.0 (98.6)	38.0 (100.4)	38.7 (101.7)	34.8 (94.6)	38.9 (102.0)
Mean daily maximum °C (°F)	27.4 (81.3)	27.9 (82.2)	28.7 (83.7)	29.2 (84.6)	30.6 (87.1)	32.0 (89.6)	31.7 (89.1)	31.6 (88.9)	31.6 (88.9)	31.2 (88.2)	29.2 (84.6)	27.3 (81.1)	29.9 (85.8)
Mean daily minimum °C (°F)	18.9 (66.0)	18.8 (65.8)	19.4 (66.9)	19.9 (67.8)	20.9 (69.6)	22.3 (72.1)	22.3 (72.1)	21.9 (71.4)	21.8 (71.2)	21.9 (71.4)	20.6 (69.1)	19.5 (67.1)	20.7 (69.3)
Record low °C (°F)	11.0 (51.8)	12.0 (53.6)	12.9 (55.2)	14.8 (58.6)	12.0 (53.6)	18.0 (64.4)	16.0 (60.8)	11.0 (51.8)	11.6 (52.9)	18.0 (64.4)	11.0 (51.8)	11.0 (51.8)	11.0 (51.8)
Average rainfall mm (inches)	164.8 (6.49)	130.3 (5.13)	150.4 (5.92)	192.2 (7.57)	198.8 (7.83)	106.9 (4.21)	121.3 (4.78)	129.0 (5.08)	99.4 (3.91)	159.2 (6.27)	310.5 (12.22)	273.2 (10.76)	2,036 (80.16)
Average rainy days (≥ 1.0 mm)	11.0	8.0	8.6	8.4	10.5	6.7	9.9	10.5	7.1	9.1	14.8	14.3	118.9
Source: NOAA

== Economy ==
The municipality of Gaspar Hernández has a diversified economy divided between tourism and agricultural production.

Ecotourism exists mainly in the Ojo de Agua district, with caves and caverns, beautiful natural landscapes, and the source of water, dipping between rocks and reappearing as the Ojo de Agua. Important hotel projects along the coast of Gaspar Hernández include: Bahia Principe, Bahia Esmeralda, El Pescador, Playa Cana, Playa Rogelio, and Punta Gorda .

The Municipal District of Veragua produces banana, maize, cassava, and sweet potatoes. The District of Joba Arriba is the largest producer of cocoa, with one of the country's largest cocoa farmers' associations. It also produces other minor agricultural products. Cattle and hogs are another important sector.

Fishing has developed gradually, catering to the tourist resorts of Sosua and Cabarete. Beekeeping is a new activity in the municipality in the production of honey, pollen and Royal Jelly.

== Notable people ==
- Ramon Lora (born 1977) - prominent baseball coach and trainer, currently serving as the head coach at Western Oklahoma State College. Under his leadership, Lora's 2011 team won the NJCAA National Championship, featuring a roster that included several Dominican players.

== Sources ==
- World Gazeteer: Dominican Republic – World-Gazetteer.com
- https://web.archive.org/web/20120701190007/http://www.quisqueyavirtual.edu.do/wiki/Municipio_Gaspar_Hern%C3%A1ndez
