= Villa Mella =

Municipality in the Dominican Republic

Coordinates: 18°33′N 69°54′W

Villa Mella (Spanish pronunciation: [ˈbiʝa ˈmeʝa]), or San Felipe de Villa Mella, is a municipality in Santo Domingo Norte, Dominican Republic. Villa Mella is located north of the Isabela River, about 6 miles (or 10 kilometers) to the north of the center of Santo Domingo, and is considered an additional neighborhood of the capital. This sector is considered one of the economically stable areas in the Santo Domingo metropolitan area. It is also home to the musical organization known as the Brotherhood of the Holy Spirit of the Congos of Villa Mella, recognized in 2001 by UNESCO.

== UNESCO recognition ==
Villa Mella is known for its retention and preservation of African cultural roots and heritage. One of the strongest manifestations of this can be found in the local, 300-year-old cofradía (brotherhood or voluntary association) of the Congos of Espíritu Santo. The Congos perform African-derived drum-centered music, primarily during traditional religious feast days, such as during Pentecost, and at funerals.

The Espíritu Santo (Holy Spirit) is considered the patron of the area (which originally developed from bateyes in what was formerly known as Sabana Grande del Espíritu Santo), and is syncretized with Kalunga, which represents both the god of the dead and the gateway to the world of the ancestors in some traditional religions of the Congo region.

The Brotherhood of the Congos of the Holy Spirit was proclaimed a UNESCO Masterpiece of the Oral and Intangible Heritage of Humanity in 2001. In 2006, the Dominican government's Secretariat of Culture and the Museo del Hombre Dominicano, under the auspices of UNESCO, adopted a "Plan of Action" to protect and preserve the Cultural Space of the Brotherhood of the Congos of the Holy Spirit of Villa Mella.

Carlos Hernández Soto, an anthropologist and the director of the Museo del Hombre Dominicano, has written a study on the Congos, entitled, Kalunga Eh! Los Congos de Villa Mella, Matías Ramón Mella: Editorial Letra Grafica, 2004.

Paul Austerlitz, in his study, Merengue: Dominican Music and Dominican Identity (Philadelphia: Temple University Press, 1997), remarks on pri-prí (or merengue palo echao), an accordion dance music particular to Villa Mella that serves as a "secular component of religious festivals" in Villa Mella.

== Notable residents ==
- Neifi Pérez
- Rubby Pérez
- Wason Brazobán
- Ada de la Cruz, Miss Universe Dominican Republic 2009 and first runner-up Miss Universe 2009
- Huascar Brazobán, professional baseball pitcher for the Miami Marlins.
- Ángel Felipe, professional baseball pitcher for the Oakland Athletics

== See also ==
- La Duquesa Sugar Mill
