= Luz García =

Dominican Republic model (born 1977)

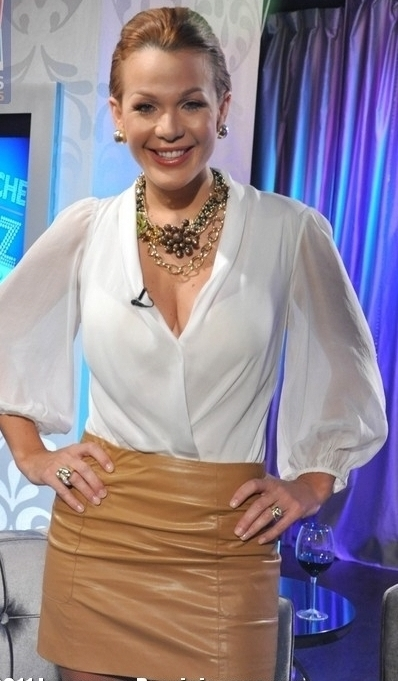
- García in the set of Noche de Luz
- Born: Luz Margarita Cecilia García Guzmán; April 15, 1977 (age 49); Moca, Espaillat, Dominican Republic
- Spouse(s): José Miguel Soto Jiménez (2008-2011)
- Children: Miguel-Ángel Soto García (b. 2010)
- Presenting career
- Show: Noche de Luz
- Station: Antena Latina (Channel 7)
- Network: Bonetti Comunicaciones
- Time slot: Saturday 9:00 to 10:30 pm
- Previous shows: Vale Más (1996-2000); Hola Gente (2000-2001); El Show del Mediodía (2001-2002); Formalmente Informal (2002); Botando el Golpe (radio, 2003); El Escándalo del 13 (2003-2004); Todo Bien (2006-2008)
- Beauty pageant titleholder
- Title: Miss Universe Dominicana 1999
- Major competitions: Miss Universe Dominicana 1999 (Winner); Miss Universe 1999
- Website: Luz García on X

Luz Margarita Cecilia García Guzmán (born April 15, 1977) is a Dominican actress, TV host and beauty pageant titleholder. García is known in Puerto Rico as Lucy Amado.

== Career ==
=== Modeling ===
García started her career as a model in Puerto Rico, then she moved back to the Dominican Republic where she participated in the beauty pageant Miss Universe Dominicana 1999, she won and represented her country in the Miss Universe 1999 contest; after that, she represented again her country now at Miss World 1999.

=== Radio and television ===
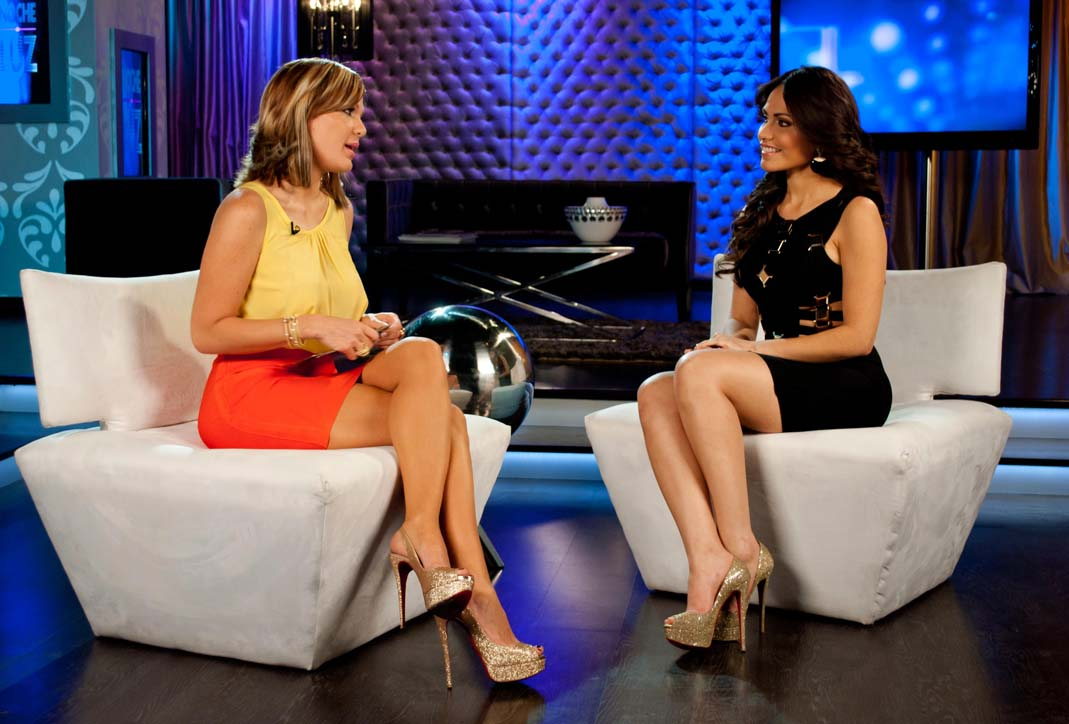
Luz García and Jenny Blanco at Noche de Luz (April 2012)

- “Vale Más” stage name: 'Lucy Amado' (1996–2000)
- “Hola Gente” (2000–2001)
- “El Show del Mediodía” (2001–2002)
- “Formalmente Informal” (2002)
- “Botando el Golpe” (radio, 2003)
- “El Escándalo del 13” (2003–2004)
- “Noche de Luz” (2004–present)
- “Todo Bien” (2006–2008)

=== Acting ===
- "Prefiero un marido infiel" (2002)
- "El buhó y la gatica" (2003)
- "¿Qué sexo prefiere Javier?" (2005)
- "Mujeres en cuatro posiciones" (2006)
- "Orgasmos" (2007)
- "El rey de Najayo" (2011)
- "El que mucho abarca" (2014)

== Personal life ==
In April 2008, she married Maj. Gen. José Miguel Soto Jiménez, former Minister of the Dominican armed forces, in a villa in La Romana. They had a son, Miguel Ángel (born 2010), and divorced on 2011.

Preceded by Selinée Méndez	Miss Dominican Republic; 1999	Succeeded by Gilda Jovine
