= Baoruco Province =

Province of the Dominican Republic

Bahoruco
- Province
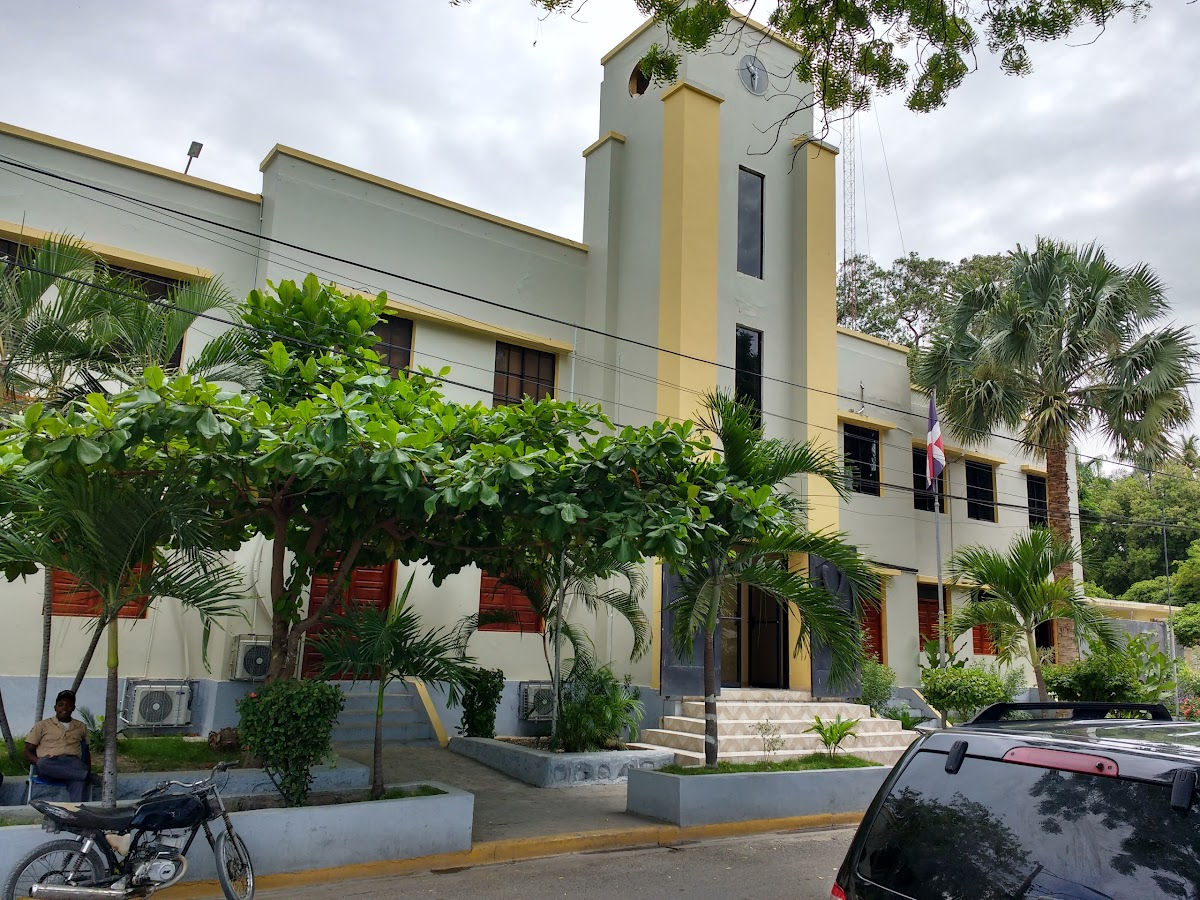
- Capital of Neiba

- Coordinates: 18°29′24″N 71°25′12″W
- Country: Dominican Republic
- Province since: 1943
- Capital: Neiba

Government
  - Congresspersons: 1 Senator; 2 Deputies

Area
  - Total: 1,284.9 km^{2} (496.1 sq mi)

Population (2022)
  - Total: 108,717
  - Density: 84.611/km^{2} (219.14/sq mi)
- Time zone: UTC-4 (EST)
- Area codes: 1-809, 1-829, 1-849
- ISO 3166 code: DO-03

Baoruco, alternatively spelt Bahoruco (Spanish pronunciation: [baoˈɾuko]), is a province of the Dominican Republic. It is spread over an area of 1,284.9 km^{2} (496.1 sq mi), and has its capital at Neiba. It was established in 1943. As per the 2022 census, it had a population of 108,717 inhabitants.

== History ==
The region was part of the Barahona Province earlier, and it was created as a new province in 1943. It was named after the Baoruco Mountain Range.

== Geography ==
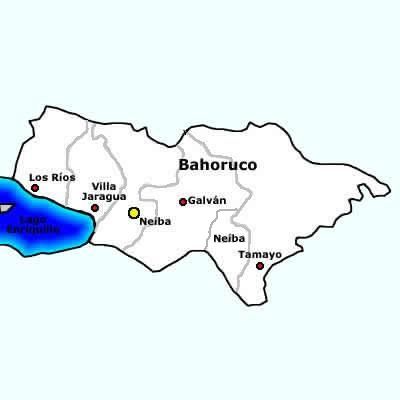
Municipalities of the Province

Baoruco is one of the 31 provinces of the Dominican Republic. It is spread over an area of 1,284.9 km^{2} (496.1 sq mi). It forms part of the Enriquillo region along with the Independencia and Pedernales Provinces. It is bordered by the San Juan Province to the north, Azua Province to the east, Barahona Province to the south and Independencia Province to the west. It occupies the northern part of the Enriquillo region, and is situated in the plains at the foothills of the Bahoruco mountains.

=== Climate and vegetation ===
The province has a tropical savanna climate (Köppen climate classification: Aw). It has an average annual temperature is 23.37 °C (74.07 °F), and receives an average annual rainfall of 8.62 cm (3.39 in) annually. The climate is warm in the plains, while it is cooler and humid near the foothills of the mountains.

About 488.1 km^{2} (188.5 sq mi) land area is covered by forests, which makes up 37.7% of the area of the province. The vegetation mainly consists of dry forests in the plains, with minor proportions of conifer forests in the mountain region, and mangroves. The Enriquillo Lake and National Park is situated in the province. Agricultural lands cover an area of 503.5 km^{2} (194.4 sq mi) in the province.

=== Administration ===
Its capital city is Neyba. The province is divided into five municipalities (municipios)– Galván, Los Ríos, Neiba, Tamayo, and Villa Jaragua. These are further sub-divided into nine Municipal Districts–El Palmar, El Salado, Uvilla, Santana, Montserrat, Cabeza de Toro, Mena, Santa Barbara and Las Clavellinas.

== Demographics ==
According to the 2022 census, Baoruco Province had a population of 108,717 inhabitants. The population consisted of 55,606 males (51.1%) and 53,111 females (48.9%). About 28.8% of the population was below the age of 15 years, 61.6% belonged to the age group of 15–64 years, and 9.6% was aged 65 years or older. The province had an urban population of 74,673 inhabitants (68.7%) and a rural population of 34,044 inhabitants (31.3%).

== Economy ==
The economy is mainly based on agriculture and livestock rearing. Major agricultural produce include fruits like bananas and mangoes. Fishing and salt production is prevalent in the lake areas.
