= Espaillat Province =

Province of the Dominican Republic

Espaillat
- Province
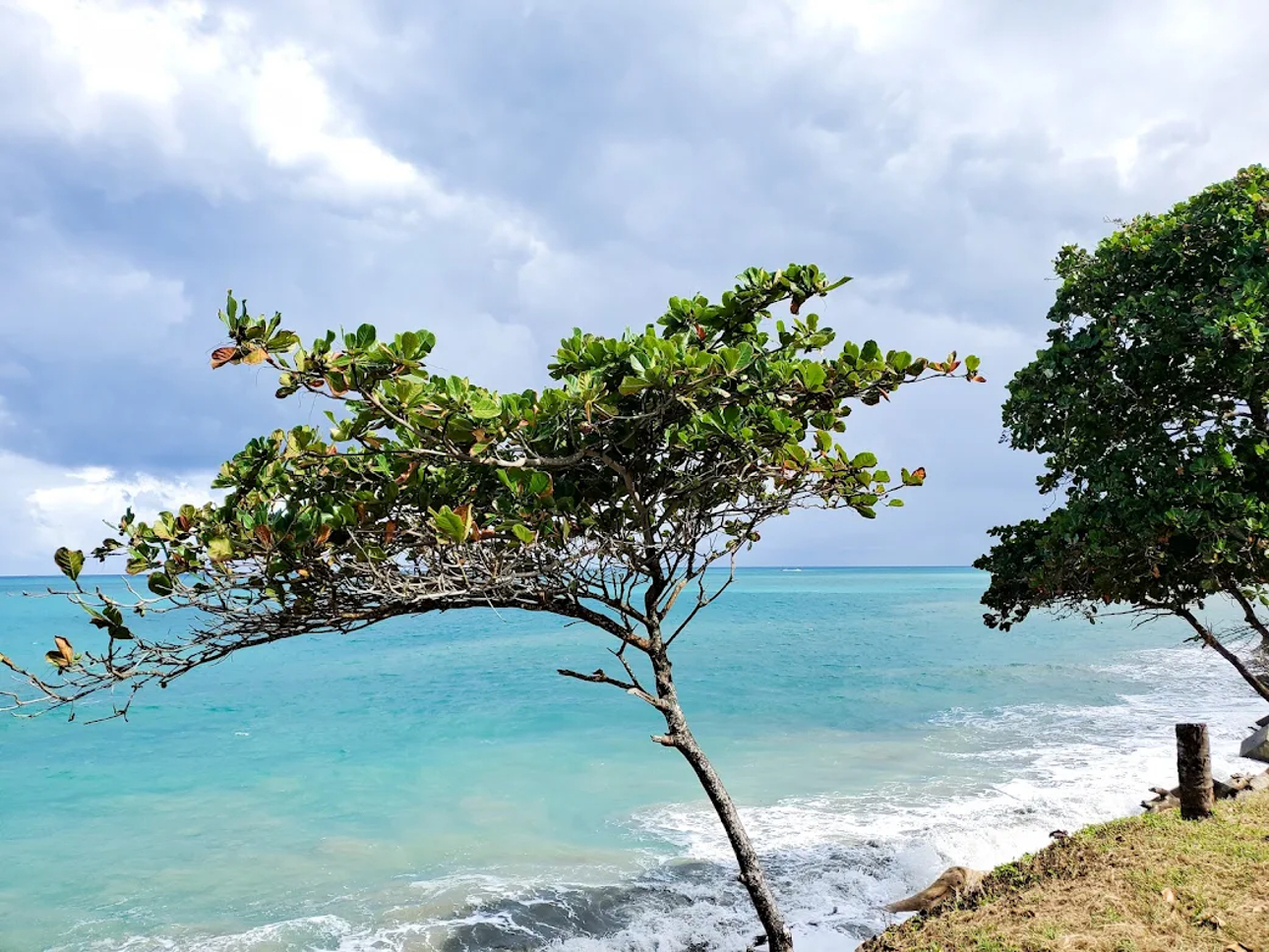
- North coast of Espaillat province
- Nickname: Tierra de Héroes
- Location of the Espaillat Province
- Country: Dominican Republic
- Region: Cibao
- Province since: 1885
- Capital: Moca

Government
  - Type: Subdivisions
  - Body: 5 municipalities 10 municipal districts
  - Congresspersons: 1 Senator; 5 Deputies

Area
  - Total: 838.62 km^{2} (323.79 sq mi)

Population (2022)
  - Total: 241,058
  - Density: 287.45/km^{2} (744.48/sq mi)
- Time zone: UTC-4 (EST)
- Area code: 1-809 1-829 1-849
- ISO 3166-2: DO-09
- Postal Code: 56000

Espaillat (Spanish pronunciation: [espajˈʝat], locally [ehpajˈʝat]) is a province in the Dominican Republic. Located in the north central part of the country, it is spread over an area of 843 km^{2} (325 sq mi), and has its capital at Moca. As per the 2022 census, it had a population of 241,058 inhabitants.

== History ==
The region was part of the La Vega Province earlier. It was created as a new province in 1885, named after author Ulises Francisco Espaillat.

== Geography ==
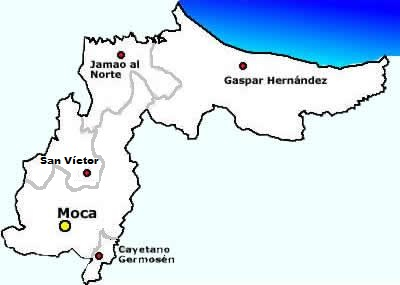
Municipalities of the Province

Espaillat is one of the 31 provinces of the Dominican Republic. It is spread over an area of 843 km^{2} (325 sq mi). It forms part of the Cibao region in the north central part of the country. It is bordered by the María Trinidad Sánchez Province to the east, Duarte, Hermanas Mirabal and La Vega Provinces to the south, Puerto Plata Province to the northwest and the Atlantic Ocean to the north.

=== Climate and vegetation ===
The province has a tropical savanna climate (Köppen climate classification: Aw). It has an average annual temperature is 26.24 °C (79.23 °F), and receives an average annual rainfall of 6.21 cm (2.44 in) annually.

About 276.79 km^{2} (106.87 sq mi) is covered by forests, which is roughly one-third of the total land area. Of this, 11.68 km^{2} (4.51 sq mi) (1.4%) of the land area is protected and forms part of two protected areas. Agricultural and pastoral lands cover an area of 490 km^{2} (190 sq mi) in the province. Major agricultural produce include coffee and sugercane.

=== Administration ===
Its capital city is Moca. The province is divided into five municipalities (municipios) and ten municipal districts (distrito municipal - D.M.) within them.

- Cayetano Germosén
- Gaspar Hernández
  - Joba Arriba (D.M.)
  - Veragua (D.M.)
  - Villa Magante (D.M.)
- Jamao al Norte
- Moca
  - Canca La Reina (D.M.)
  - El Higüerito (D.M.)
  - José Contreras (D.M.)
  - Juan López (D.M.)
  - La Ortega (D.M.)
  - Las Lagunas (D.M.)
  - Monte de La Jagua (D.M.)
- San Víctor

== Demographics ==
According to the 2022 census, the province had a population of 241,058 inhabitants. The population consisted of 122,183 males (50.7%) and 118,875 females (49.3%). About 21.7% of the population was below the age of 15 years, 67% belonged to the age group of 15–64 years, and 11.3% was aged 65 years or older. The province had a rural population of 132,954 inhabitants (55.2%) and an urban population of 108,104 inhabitants (44.8%).
