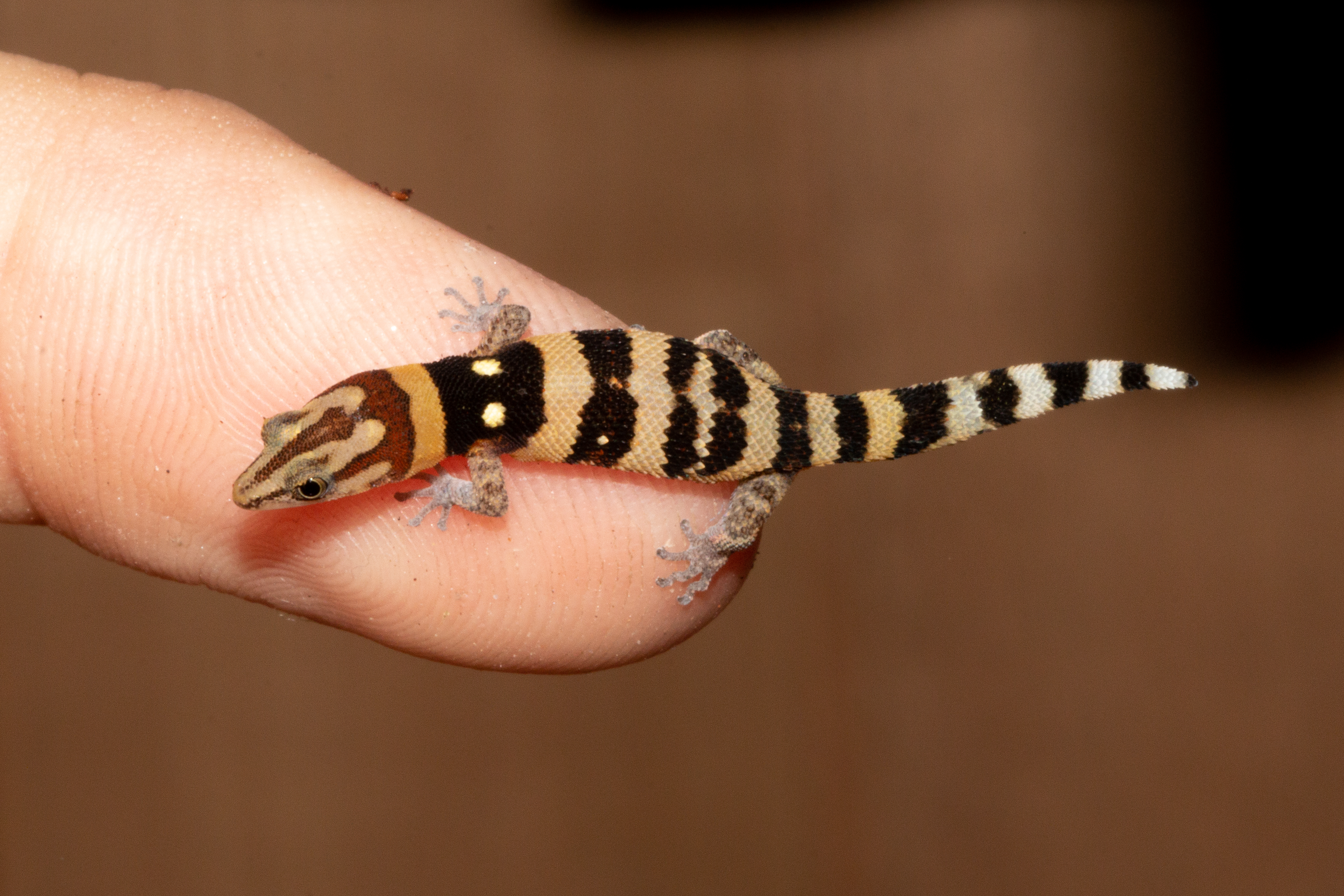
- A juvenile Sphaerodactylus callocricus

Conservation status
- Critically Endangered (IUCN 3.1)

Scientific classification
- Kingdom: Animalia
- Phylum: Chordata
- Class: Reptilia
- Order: Squamata
- Suborder: Gekkota
- Family: Sphaerodactylidae
- Genus: Sphaerodactylus
- Species: S. callocricus

Binomial name
- Sphaerodactylus callocricus Schwartz, 1976

= Sphaerodactylus callocricus =

Species of lizard

Sphaerodactylus callocricus, also known as the beautifully ringed sphaero, rough-banded sphaero or rough-banded least gecko, is a species of lizard in the family Sphaerodactylidae . It is endemic to the Dominican Republic.

== Taxonomic history ==
This species was described in 1976 by Albert Schwartz, who received multiple specimen collected by Louis G. Thompson in the Samaná peninsula during malacological surveys.

The type locality is "2.9 mi. (4.6 km) S Las Galeras, Samaná Province, República Dominicana".

=== Etymology ===
The name "callocricus" has a Greek origin, and bears reference to the banded color pattern of this species. The specific epithet can be translated to "beautifully ringed", with "kallos" meaning "beautiful" and "krikos" meaning "ring".

== Distribution and habitat ==
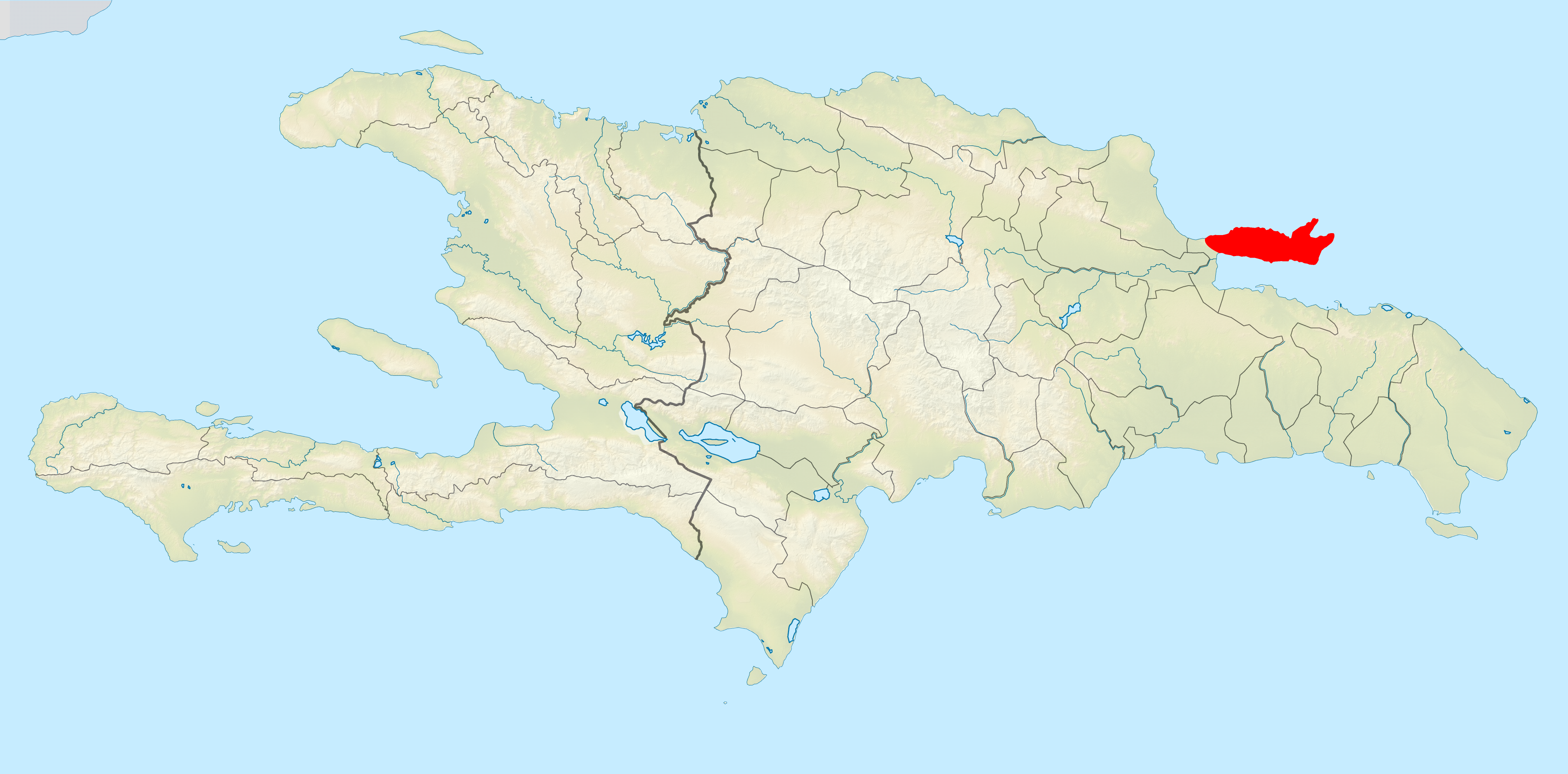
Distribution of Sphaerodactylus callocricus. Known range in red.

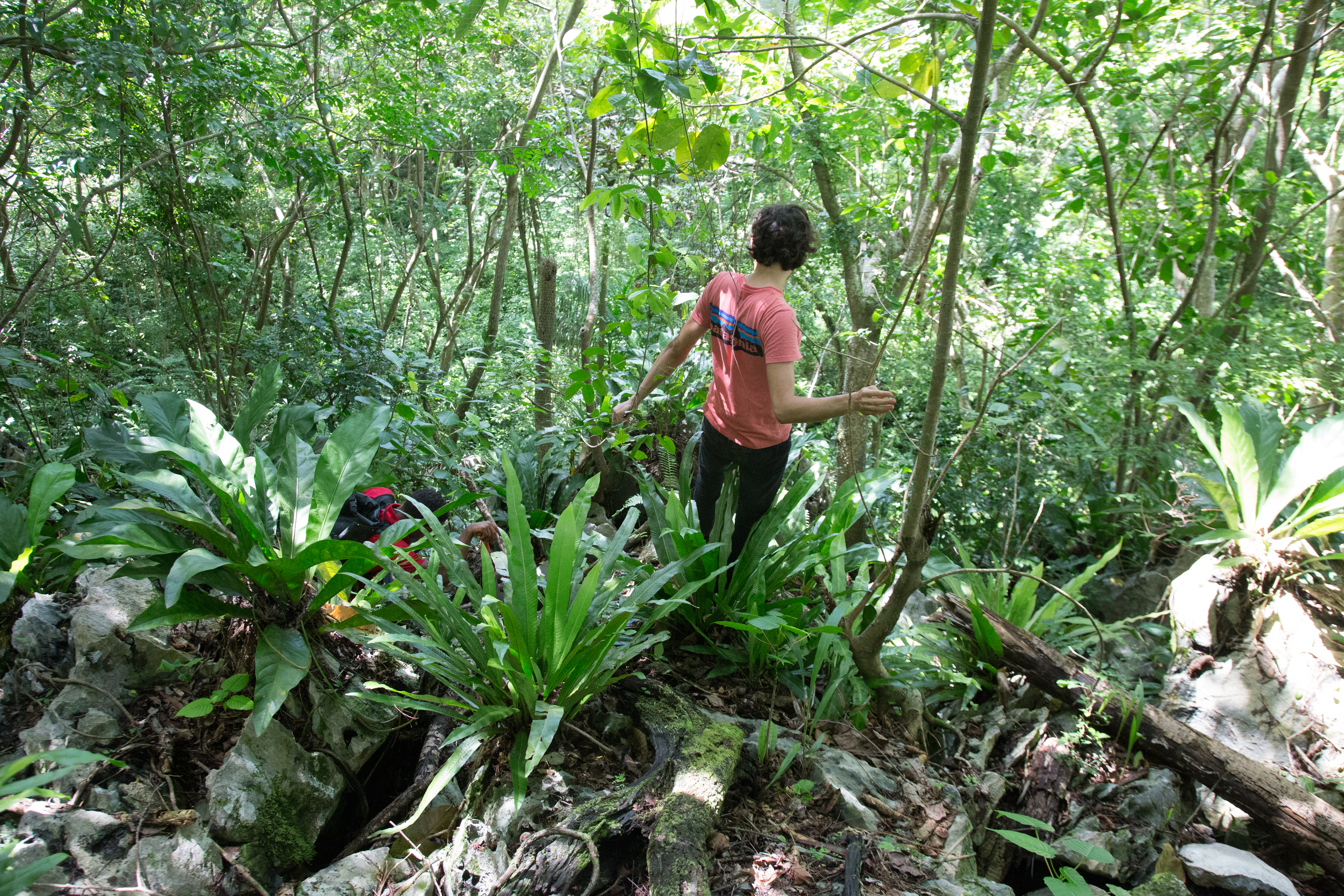
Typical habitat of Sphaerodactylus callocricus in the Samaná peninsula.

This species is endemic to the Samaná peninsula on eastern Dominican Republic. Within the peninsula, this species is not common, and is associated with karstic forests, where it can be encountered under stones, boulders, leaf litter and other debris. Specimen can also be seen during the day active on the forest floor.

== Morphology ==
S. callocricus is a moderately sized species of Sphaerodactylus, with relatively large, keeled and imbricate dorsal scales. Members of this species are conspicuously banded, with dark transverse bands on a pale, yellowish gray background color. A very large scapular patch is present, with paired ocelli at its center. The head pattern consists on a series of stripes, blotches or bands forming a "W" shape.

There is little sexual dimorphism in this species, and both adult males, females and juveniles resemble each other. The pattern in juveniles tends to be much more contrasting, and it gradually fades in intensity as the specimen matures.

== Conservation ==
According to the most recent IUCN Red List assessment, S. callocricus is listed as critically endangered (CR).The distribution of S. callocricus is very restricted, and the species has been estimated to occupy a range of less than 100 km².

Tourism development, small scale agriculture and pasture expansion are the main threats affecting this species. S. callocricus needs old growth karstic forests to thrive, and these ecosystems are disappearing from the Samaná at a fast rate. As they are very sensitive to habitat perturbations, this species is threatened by human activities. The home range of the species is likewise drastically reduced, and recent surveys have failed to find surviving populations of this species in historical locations where habitat has been modified.

== Images ==
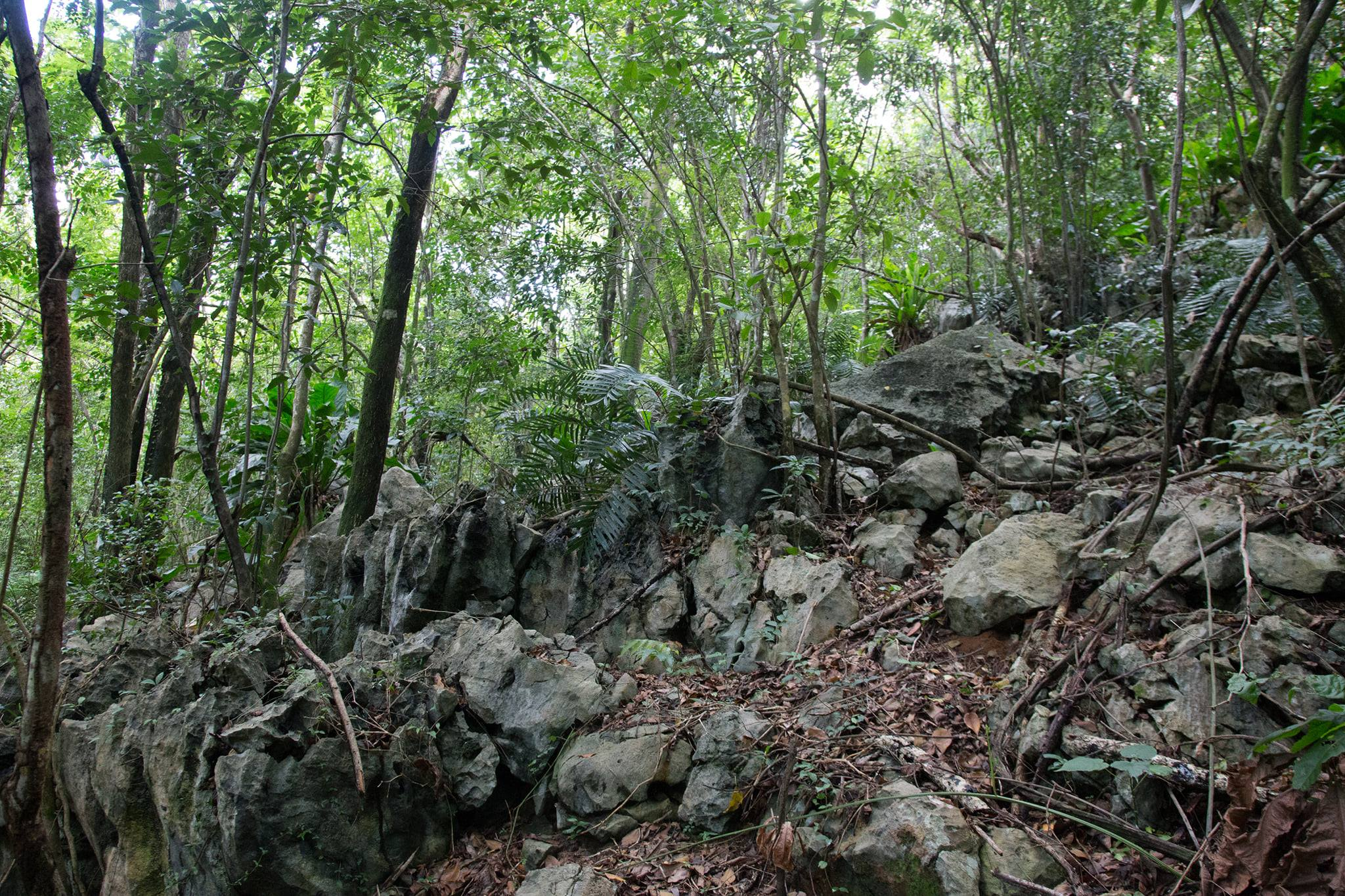
Intact habitat of Sphaerodactylus callocricus.

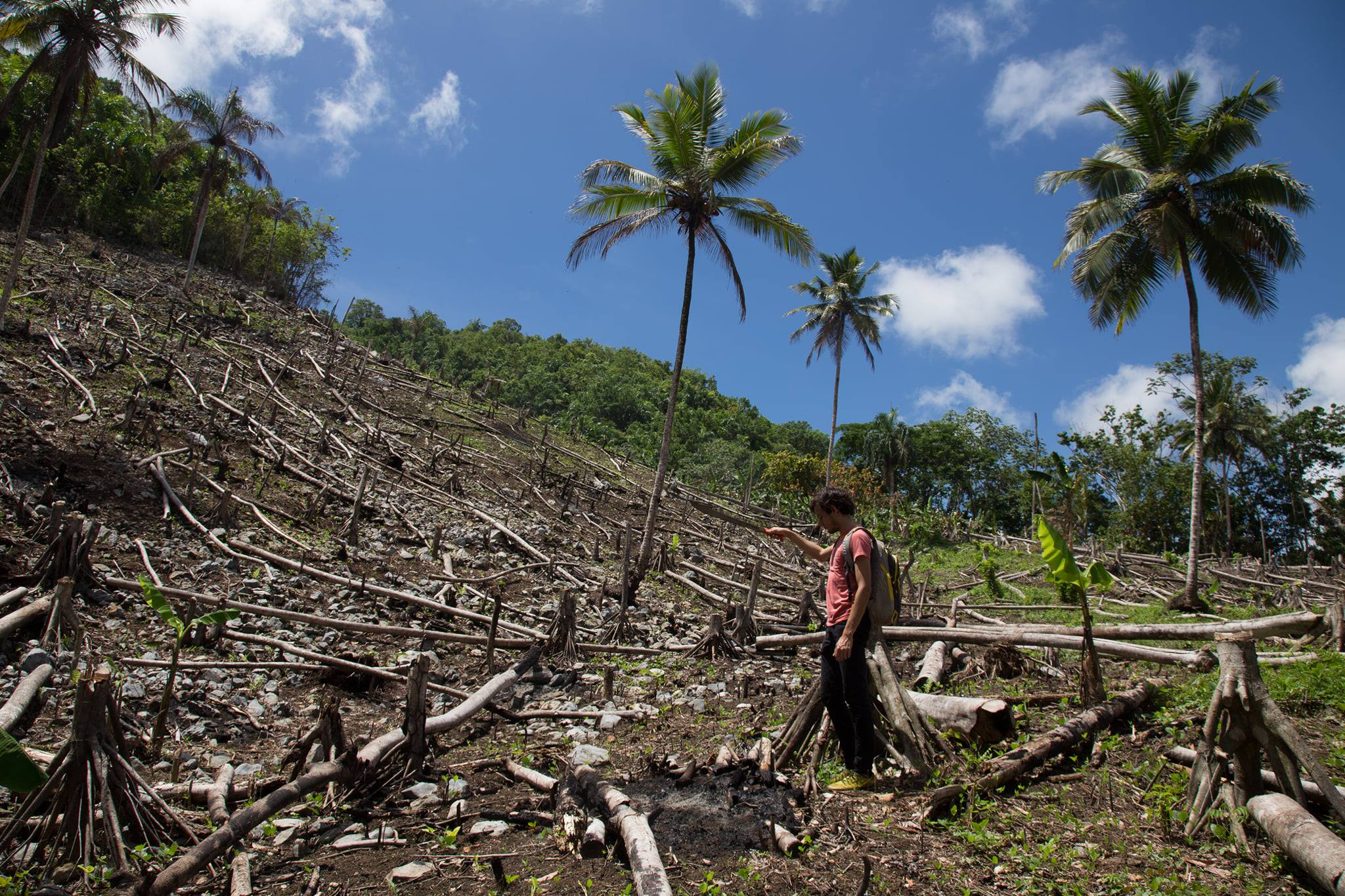
Former habitat of S. callocricus after being destroyed by human activities.
