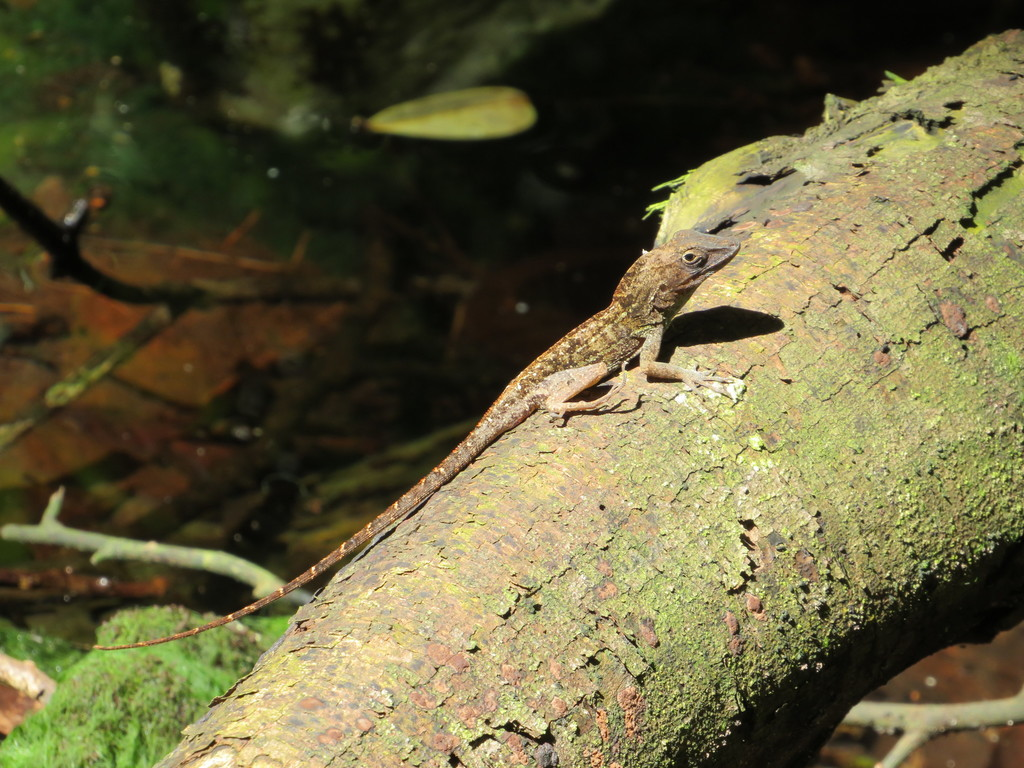

Scientific classification
- Kingdom: Animalia
- Phylum: Chordata
- Class: Reptilia
- Order: Squamata
- Suborder: Iguania
- Family: Dactyloidae
- Genus: Anolis
- Species: A. hispaniolae

Binomial name
- Anolis hispaniolae (Köhler, Zimmer, McGrath, & Hedges, 2019)

Synonyms
- Audantia hispaniolae Köhler, Zimmer, McGrath, & Hedges, 2019

= Anolis hispaniolae =

Species of lizard

Anolis hispaniolae, the common stout anole, is a species of lizard in the family Dactyloidae. Males grow to 67 mm (2.6 in) and females to 56 mm (2.2 in) in snout–vent length. Males have cream-white dewlaps with a yellow, green, or orange hue and irregular, medium-sized gorgetals. They also have dark stripes on the throat. It is endemic to Hispaniola, where it is widespread, being found across most of the island north of the Baoruco Mountain Range, with the exception of the far northwest. The anole lives in a variety of habitats, from humid cloud forests to dry forests, at elevations of up to 1,800 m (5,900 ft).

== Taxonomy ==
Anolis hispaniolae was formally described in 2019 as Audantia hispaniolae based on a specimen from El Limón in the Samaná Peninsula of the Dominican Republic. The species is named after the island of Hispaniola, to which it is native, due to its widespread range on the island. It has the common name common stout anole.

Specimens of Anolis hispaniolae were historically considered to represent Anolis cybotes, but A. hispaniolae is in actuality most closely related to A. doris. The extremely large genus Anolis is sometimes split into several smaller genera; under this arrangement, Anolis hispaniolae is placed in the genus Audantia, a group of more than a dozen species endemic to Hispaniola.

== Description ==
Males of the species grow to a snout–vent length of 67 mm (2.6 in) and females to 56 mm (2.2 in). Males have cream-white dewlaps with a yellow, green, or orange hue and irregular, medium-sized gorgetals. They also have dark stripes on the throat.

== Distribution and ecology ==
Anolis hispaniolae is endemic to Hispaniola, a large Caribbean island in the Greater Antilles that is politically split between the Dominican Republic and Haiti. A. hispaniolae is widespread across the island, with a range stretching across most of the island north of the Baoruco Mountain Range, with the exception of the far northwest. The anole lives in a variety of habitats, including from humid cloud forests to dry forests, at elevations of up to 1,800 m (5,900 ft). It is also known from human settlements that have at least some trees. These anoles can be seen hiding below rocks and dead agaves or perched on stones and low vegetation in the daytime, as well as sleeping on vegetation a few metres up at night. They flee if approached at a distance of less than around 2 m (6.6 ft) and make a sharp distress call if captured.

Anolis hispaniolae has not been evaluated by the IUCN, but the authors who described the species recommended it be classified as being of least concern due to its large range and commonness.
