= Cayo Levantado Port =

Port in the Dominican Republic

Cayo Levantado Port or Samana Port or Fondeaderon Port is located in Arroyo Barril, Samana, Dominican Republic.

== Overview ==
Port of Samana was built in 1977 as a free commercial port to deposit or commercialize non-taxes products. It does not receive any container operations, and it is currently with non-regular operations.

== Port information ==
- Location: 19°12′10″N 69°19′57″W
- Local time: UTC−4
- Weather/climate/prevailing winds: From May 15 until September 15
- Climate: mostly sunny, tropical. Hurricane season runs from June to November
- Prevailing winds: direction ENE–ESE
- Average temperature range: 28–30 °C

== See also ==
- List of ports and harbours of the Atlantic Ocean
