= Arroyo Barril =

Coordinates: 19°12′N 69°27′W

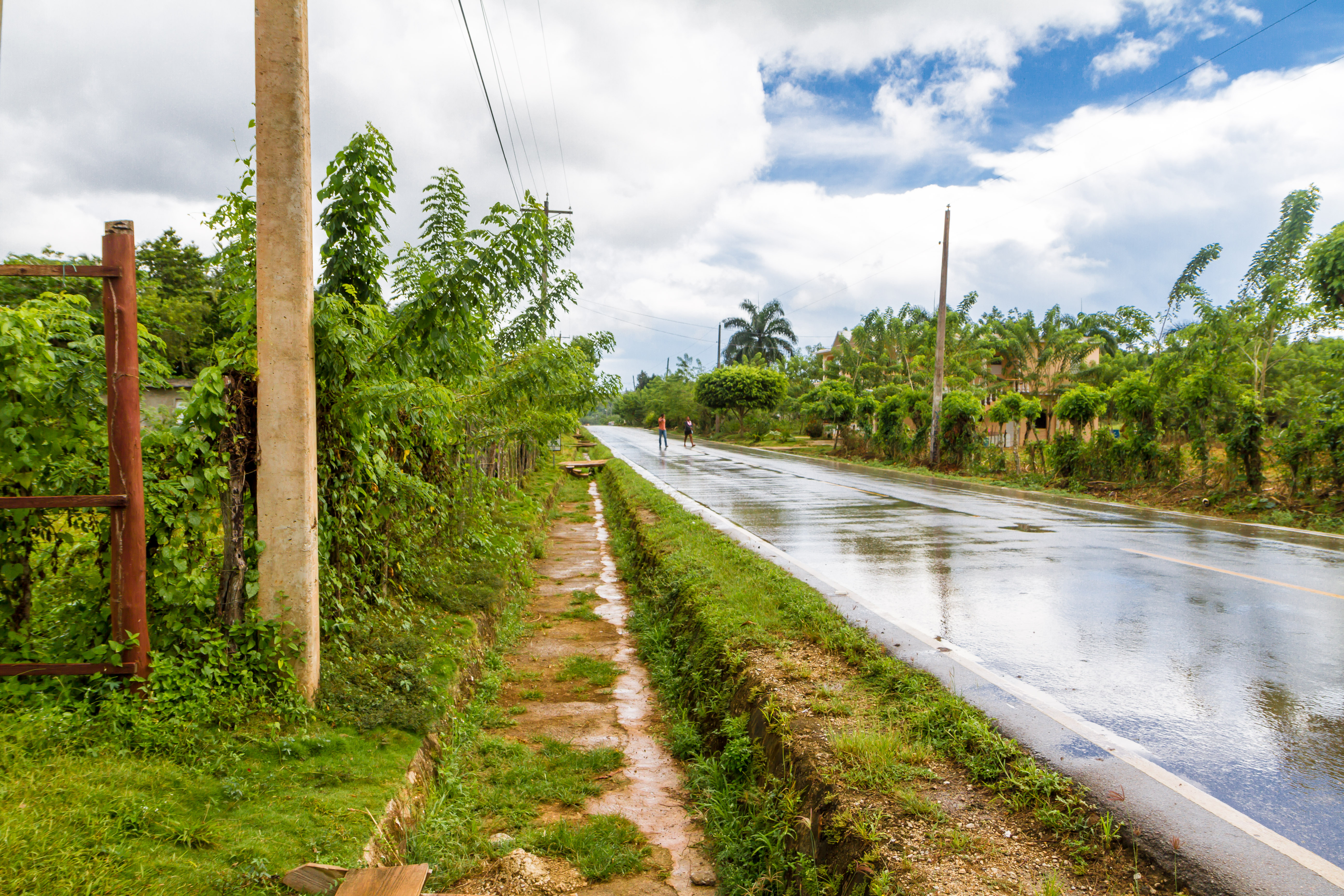
Rancho Español.

Arroyo Barril is a municipal district of Santa Bárbara de Samaná, Samaná Province in the Dominican Republic. It is on the south coast of the Samaná Peninsula, on the coast of Samaná Bay.

It was elevated to the category of municipal district on May 1, 2003.

== Climate ==
Climate data for Arroyo Barril Airport (1991–2020)
Month	Jan	Feb	Mar	Apr	May	Jun	Jul	Aug	Sep	Oct	Nov	Dec	Year
Mean daily maximum °C (°F)	30.0 (86.0)	30.5 (86.9)	31.0 (87.8)	31.5 (88.7)	31.8 (89.2)	32.4 (90.3)	32.4 (90.3)	32.4 (90.3)	32.5 (90.5)	32.2 (90.0)	31.0 (87.8)	30.4 (86.7)	31.5 (88.7)
Daily mean °C (°F)	25.0 (77.0)	25.4 (77.7)	26.0 (78.8)	26.6 (79.9)	27.0 (80.6)	27.7 (81.9)	27.7 (81.9)	27.7 (81.9)	27.6 (81.7)	27.3 (81.1)	26.3 (79.3)	25.6 (78.1)	26.6 (79.9)
Mean daily minimum °C (°F)	20.1 (68.2)	20.3 (68.5)	20.9 (69.6)	21.6 (70.9)	22.3 (72.1)	22.9 (73.2)	22.9 (73.2)	22.9 (73.2)	22.7 (72.9)	22.4 (72.3)	21.6 (70.9)	20.7 (69.3)	21.8 (71.2)
Average precipitation mm (inches)	142.6 (5.61)	95.2 (3.75)	108.0 (4.25)	142.1 (5.59)	207.2 (8.16)	133.4 (5.25)	183.0 (7.20)	229.3 (9.03)	232.5 (9.15)	239.6 (9.43)	272.3 (10.72)	182.0 (7.17)	2,167.2 (85.32)
Source: NOAA

Climate data for Arroyo Barril (1961–1990)
Month	Jan	Feb	Mar	Apr	May	Jun	Jul	Aug	Sep	Oct	Nov	Dec	Year
Record high °C (°F)	35.0 (95.0)	33.0 (91.4)	34.6 (94.3)	34.5 (94.1)	34.5 (94.1)	34.0 (93.2)	34.2 (93.6)	35.0 (95.0)	35.6 (96.1)	34.8 (94.6)	33.8 (92.8)	32.6 (90.7)	35.6 (96.1)
Mean daily maximum °C (°F)	29.3 (84.7)	29.4 (84.9)	29.9 (85.8)	30.5 (86.9)	30.8 (87.4)	31.4 (88.5)	31.5 (88.7)	31.4 (88.5)	31.4 (88.5)	31.1 (88.0)	30.3 (86.5)	29.5 (85.1)	30.5 (86.9)
Daily mean °C (°F)	24.6 (76.3)	24.6 (76.3)	25.2 (77.4)	25.8 (78.4)	26.2 (79.2)	26.9 (80.4)	27.0 (80.6)	26.7 (80.1)	26.8 (80.2)	26.5 (79.7)	25.7 (78.3)	24.9 (76.8)	25.9 (78.6)
Mean daily minimum °C (°F)	19.8 (67.6)	19.9 (67.8)	20.4 (68.7)	21.1 (70.0)	21.7 (71.1)	22.4 (72.3)	22.5 (72.5)	22.1 (71.8)	22.2 (72.0)	21.9 (71.4)	21.1 (70.0)	20.3 (68.5)	21.3 (70.3)
Record low °C (°F)	17.0 (62.6)	16.8 (62.2)	16.6 (61.9)	18.0 (64.4)	17.8 (64.0)	19.0 (66.2)	19.0 (66.2)	18.6 (65.5)	18.0 (64.4)	19.0 (66.2)	17.8 (64.0)	15.8 (60.4)	15.8 (60.4)
Average rainfall mm (inches)	123.0 (4.84)	79.7 (3.14)	107.6 (4.24)	166.5 (6.56)	309.4 (12.18)	182.8 (7.20)	160.1 (6.30)	195.2 (7.69)	164.4 (6.47)	257.4 (10.13)	230.4 (9.07)	200.1 (7.88)	2,176.6 (85.69)
Average rainy days (≥ 1.0 mm)	11.2	7.8	7.4	9.1	15.9	10.5	12.4	13.9	12.8	15.1	17.4	13.8	147.3
Average relative humidity (%)	78.9	77.0	75.4	75.9	77.6	75.6	74.9	76.5	77.6	76.5	79.2	79.6	77.1
Source: NOAA

== Population ==
In the last national census (2002), the population of Arroyo Barril was included with that of Santa Bárbara de Samaná.

== Economy ==
The most important economic activities of Arroyo Barril are the same as the province as a whole: agriculture, fishing and tourism.
