= Samaná (town) =

Samaná Santa Bárbara de Samaná Xamaná
- Saint Barbara of Samana
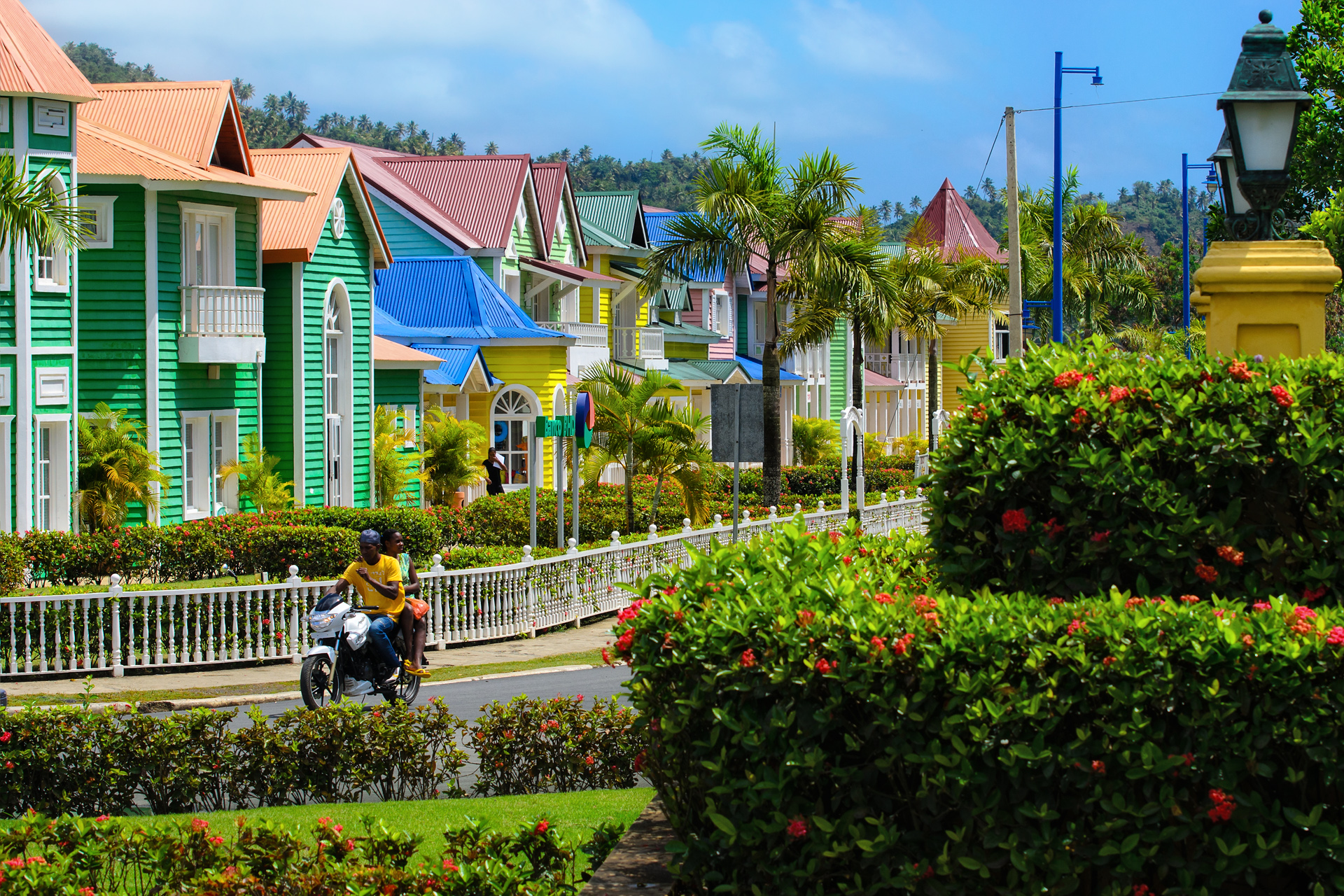
- Samaná neighborhood (2011)

- Samaná in the Dominican Republic
- Coordinates: 19°12′N 69°19′W
- Country: Dominican Republic
- Province: Samaná
- Founded: 1756
- Municipality since: 1865

Area
  - Total: 412.11 km^{2} (159.12 sq mi)
- Elevation: 5 m (16 ft)

Population (2012)
  - Total: 108,179
  - Density: 262.50/km^{2} (679.87/sq mi)
  - Demonym: Samanés/ Samana American
- Municipalities: 3

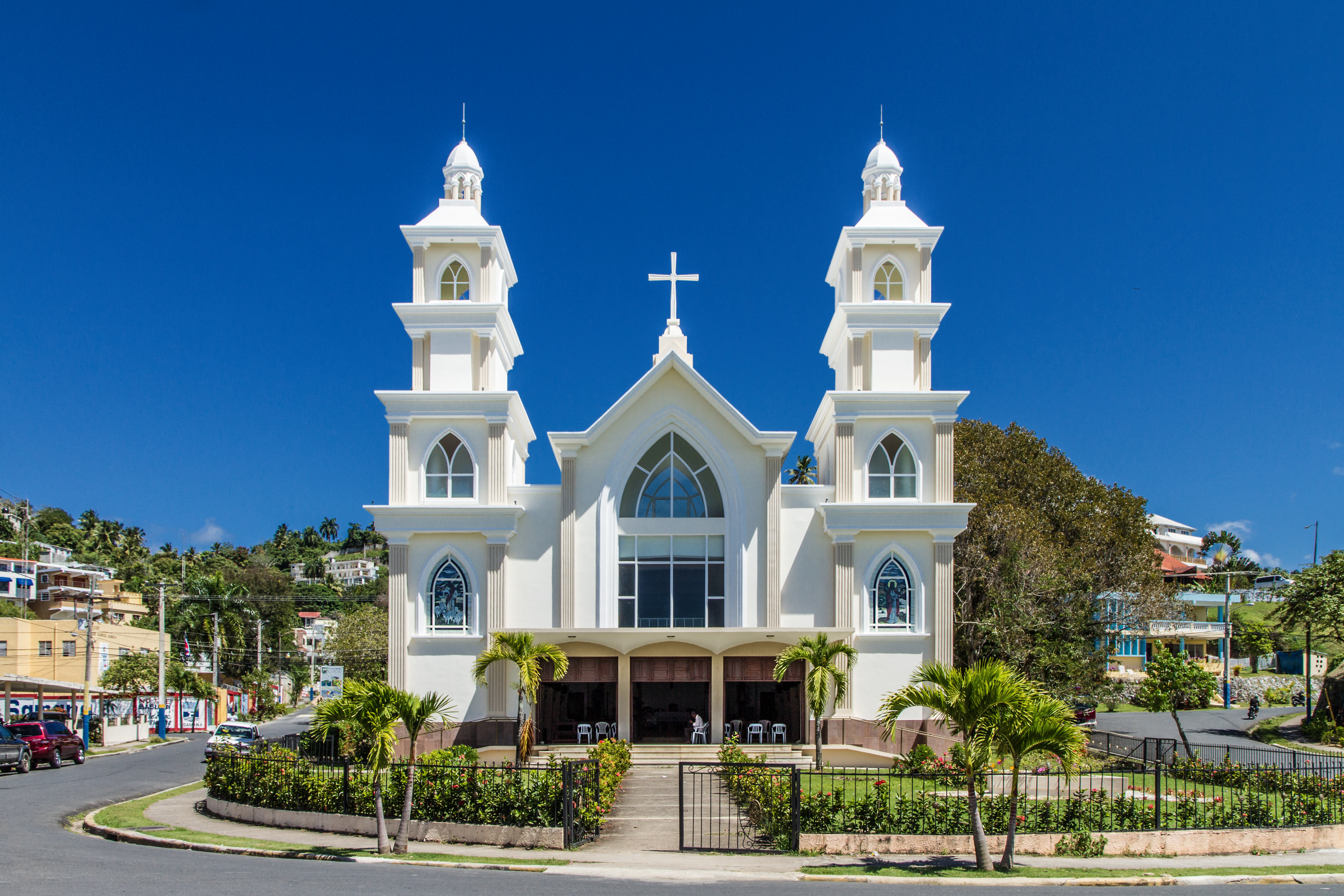
Catholic church in Santa Bárbara de Samaná.

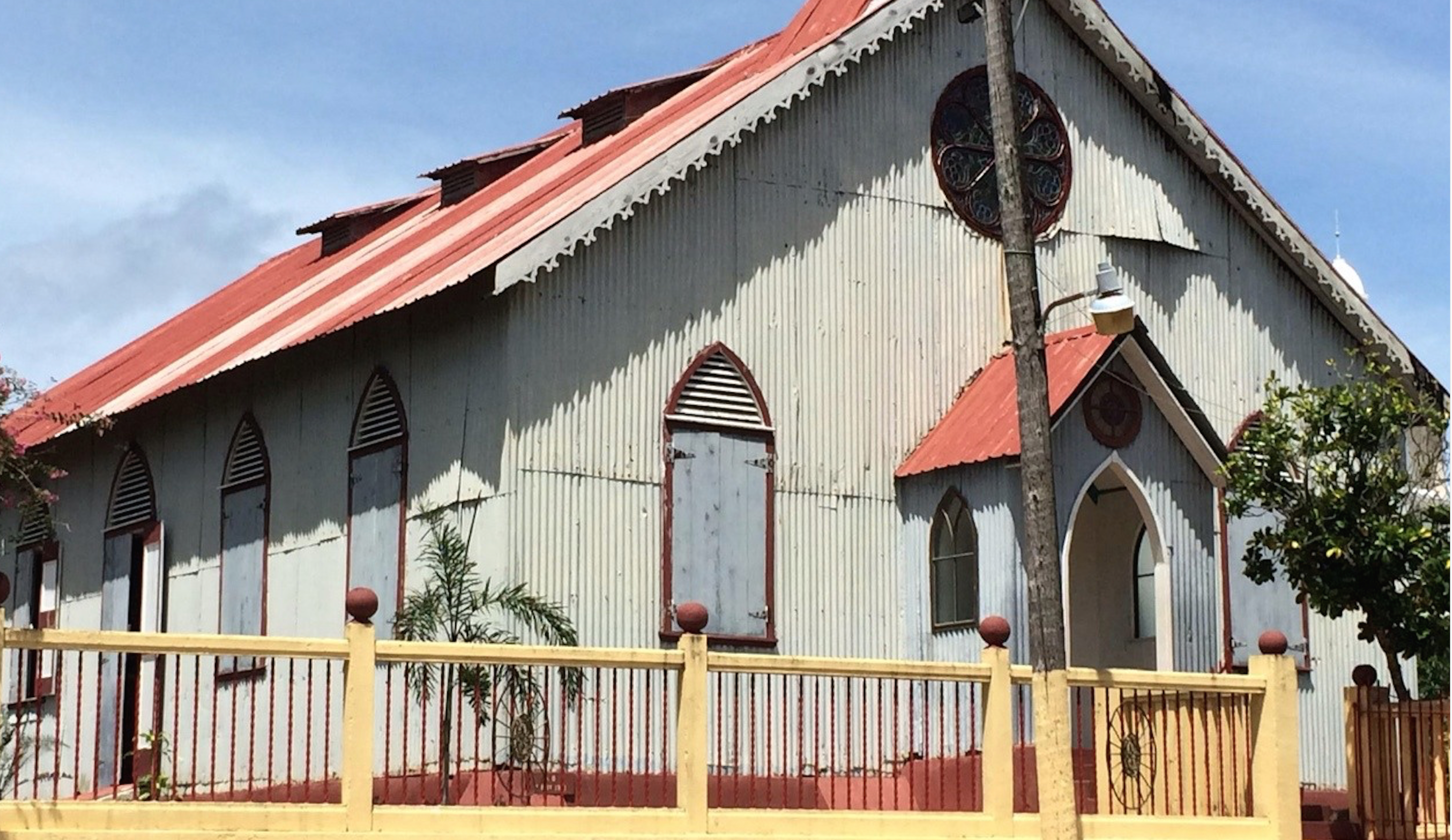
La Chorcha, St. Peter's Evangelical Church (former Wesleyan)

Samaná (old spelling: Xamaná), in full Santa Bárbara de Samaná, is a town and municipality in northeastern Dominican Republic and the capital of Samaná Province. It is on the northern coast of Samaná Bay. The town is an important tourism destination and the main center for whale-watching tours in the Caribbean region.

The town has three municipal districts: El Limón, Las Galeras, and Arroyo Barril. According to the 2012 population and housing census, the municipality has a total population of 108,179.

== Geography ==
Samaná is on a small plain close to the coast but most of the town is in the hills that enclose the plain.

It is the largest municipality of the province. It has a total area of 412.11 km^{2} (almost 49% of the total area of the province), including the three municipal districts that are part of the municipality.

Most of the territory is occupied by the Sierra de Samaná, a short mountain range with steep slopes but no high mountains. The highest mountain is Monte Mesa (605 m).

== Population ==
The demonym for the inhabitants of Samaná, both the city and the province, is Samanés (men and women). It is also possible to use Samanense.

== History ==
The town of Santa Barbara of Samaná sits on the Samaná Peninsula which came first into written history on 13 January 1493, when Christopher Columbus made here the last stop of his first voyage to the New World. He landed on what today is known as the Rincón Beach, where he met the Ciguayos who presented him with the only violent resistance he faced during this visit to the Americas. The Cigüayos had refused to trade their bows and arrows that Columbus's pathfinders wanted. In the ensuing clash, two Amerindians were wounded. Because of the Ciguayos' use of arrows, the Admiral called the inlet the Bay of Arrows (or Gulf of Arrows). Columbus took on board four natives to show in Spain, but only one survived. For most of the colonial period, the Spanish did not settle here, opening the place for runaways and privateers.

In 1756, under the direction of Spanish governor Francisco Rubio y Peñaranda, families from the Canary Islands founded the village and named it Santa Bárbara de Samaná. It was named Santa Bárbara after the Queen Bárbara de Braganza, wife of King Ferdinand VI of Spain. They also settled on the other side of the bay, in Sabana de la Mar. As part of the Peace of Basel's accords, the entire Santo Domingo colony passed over to the French in 1796. But in 1807, a small force from the British Royal Navy raided Samaná and turned it back to the Spanish creoles who were fighting against the last French bastion on the island. In 1822, after the Haitians had occupied the entire island, a French vessel threatened a renewal of the French-Haitian hostilities. After a small encounter called the Samaná Affair, the French retired, taking with them various families that had resettled here after the Haitian Revolution.

In 1824, Haitian President Jean-Pierre Boyer invited United States Blacks to migrate to Haiti, which by then ruled the entire island of Hispaniola. Various U.S. families settled in Samaná and prospered. Their descendants are known as Samaná Americans. With the creation of the Samaná Maritime District (an old division similar to a province) in 1865, the city was elevated to the category of municipality.

== Economy ==
The main economic activities of the municipality are tourism, agriculture and fishing. The largest boost to local economy takes place from January to March with the annual migration of thousands of North Atlantic humpback whales that come to the Samaná Bay to give birth. Samaná is the center of the country's tourism during these months.

== Climate ==
The annual rainfall in Samaná is 2,211.9 millimetres (87.08 in) and the mean annual temperature is 26.2 °C (79.2 °F).

Climate data for Samaná (1961–1990)
Month	Jan	Feb	Mar	Apr	May	Jun	Jul	Aug	Sep	Oct	Nov	Dec	Year
Record high °C (°F)	33.0 (91.4)	34.0 (93.2)	36.0 (96.8)	36.0 (96.8)	35.2 (95.4)	37.0 (98.6)	39.2 (102.6)	37.0 (98.6)	37.0 (98.6)	38.5 (101.3)	36.0 (96.8)	35.0 (95.0)	39.2 (102.6)
Mean daily maximum °C (°F)	29.2 (84.6)	29.5 (85.1)	30.2 (86.4)	30.7 (87.3)	31.5 (88.7)	32.5 (90.5)	32.6 (90.7)	32.7 (90.9)	32.6 (90.7)	32.2 (90.0)	30.6 (87.1)	29.6 (85.3)	31.2 (88.2)
Daily mean °C (°F)	24.2 (75.6)	24.4 (75.9)	25.1 (77.2)	25.7 (78.3)	26.7 (80.1)	27.7 (81.9)	27.9 (82.2)	27.9 (82.2)	27.7 (81.9)	27.2 (81.0)	25.6 (78.1)	24.6 (76.3)	26.2 (79.2)
Mean daily minimum °C (°F)	19.1 (66.4)	19.3 (66.7)	19.9 (67.8)	20.6 (69.1)	21.8 (71.2)	22.8 (73.0)	23.1 (73.6)	23.0 (73.4)	22.7 (72.9)	22.2 (72.0)	20.6 (69.1)	19.6 (67.3)	21.2 (70.2)
Record low °C (°F)	15.0 (59.0)	15.0 (59.0)	14.5 (58.1)	16.0 (60.8)	16.0 (60.8)	19.0 (66.2)	19.0 (66.2)	19.0 (66.2)	19.0 (66.2)	18.5 (65.3)	17.0 (62.6)	15.5 (59.9)	14.5 (58.1)
Average rainfall mm (inches)	145.7 (5.74)	109.5 (4.31)	116.6 (4.59)	141.8 (5.58)	231.5 (9.11)	152.2 (5.99)	185.1 (7.29)	229.2 (9.02)	193.3 (7.61)	246.9 (9.72)	257.2 (10.13)	202.9 (7.99)	2,211.9 (87.08)
Average rainy days (≥ 1.0 mm)	15.6	11.7	10.5	9.9	15.0	13.7	16.7	17.7	15.7	17.2	18.5	17.6	179.8
Source: NOAA (Daily mean data are calculations obtained from mean daily maximum and mean daily minimum)

== Notable people ==
- Manny Albam (1922–2001), jazz saxophonist
- Wily Peralta (b. 1989), baseball pitcher for the Milwaukee Brewers
- Hanley Ramírez (b. 1983), baseball first baseman for the Boston Red Sox.
- Fernando Rodney (b. 1977), baseball pitcher for the Seattle Mariners.
- Yordano Ventura (1991–2017), baseball pitcher for the Kansas City Royals.
- Théodore Chassériau (1819–1856), a French painter, was born in El Limón in 1819.
- Brayan Bello (b. 1999), baseball pitcher for the Boston Red Sox.

== Transport ==
There are two commercial airports: the international Samaná El Catey International Airport, 40 miles by road from the city, and the domestic Arroyo Barril Airport, 10 miles from the city by car.
