= El Portillo Airport =

- IATA: EPS; ICAO: MDPO

Summary
- Airport type: Public
- Serves: Samaná, Dominican Republic
- Location: Las Terrenas
- Elevation AMSL: 17 ft / 5 m
- Coordinates: 19°19′17.15″N 069°29′45.26″W

Map
- Location of airport in the Dominican Republic

Runways
| Direction | Length | | Surface |
| Direction | ft | m | Surface |
|---|---|---|---|
| 09/27 | 1,550 | 472 | Asphalt |

El Portillo National Airport (IATA: EPS, ICAO: MDPO) served the province of Samaná. It was located at the north of this province. This airport was used for private flights operators and some charter service into the Dominican Republic. This airport ceased to be operational in February 2012.
