= Samaná Province =

Province of the Dominican Republic

Samaná Province Provincia de Samaná (Spanish) Province de Samaná (French)
- Province
- Nickname: La Normandie des Antilles; La Normandía de las Antillas; The Normandy of the Antilles
- Motto: The beauty of three bays La beauté de trois baies La belleza de tres bahias
- Location of the Samaná Province
- Coordinates: 19°14′44″N 69°27′03″W
- Country: Dominican Republic
- Region: Cibao
- Province since: 1867
- Capital: Santa Bárbara de Samaná (Port Napoleon)

Government
  - Type: Subdivisions
  - Body: 3 municipalities 3 municipal districts
  - Congresspersons: 1 Senator; 2 Deputies

Area
  - Total: 853.74 km^{2} (329.63 sq mi)

Population (2014)
  - Total: 139,707
  - Density: 163.64/km^{2} (423.83/sq mi)
- Time zone: UTC−4 (AST)
- Area code: 1-809 1-829 1-849
- ISO 3166-2: DO-20
- Postal code: 32000

Samaná (Spanish pronunciation: [samaˈna]) is a province of the Dominican Republic in the Samaná Peninsula located in the eastern region. Its capital is Santa Bárbara de Samaná, usually known as Samaná.

The province is on the coast of the Atlantic Ocean in the northeastern part of the Dominican Republic. It is known for the mountains of which it is almost entirely formed. Samaná has numerous beaches.

Samaná was originally larger covering the area of what is now the María Trinidad Sánchez province, before being divided during the Trujillo era.

Samaná was also once known as the Samana Bay Company of Santo Domingo.

== Geography ==
The Samaná province is occupied by the Sierra de Samaná mountain range, which reaches many of the coastal areas. The highest mountain in this range (and in the province) is located in the eastern portion and is called La Meseta. Samaná has a tropical rainforest climate, with an annual average temperature of 25.9 degrees Celsius. Annual precipitation in the Sierra de Samaná is greater than 2,000 millimeters. There are numerous rivers and streams throughout the province, including the final part of the Yuna River, which flows into the western end of the Samaná Bay.

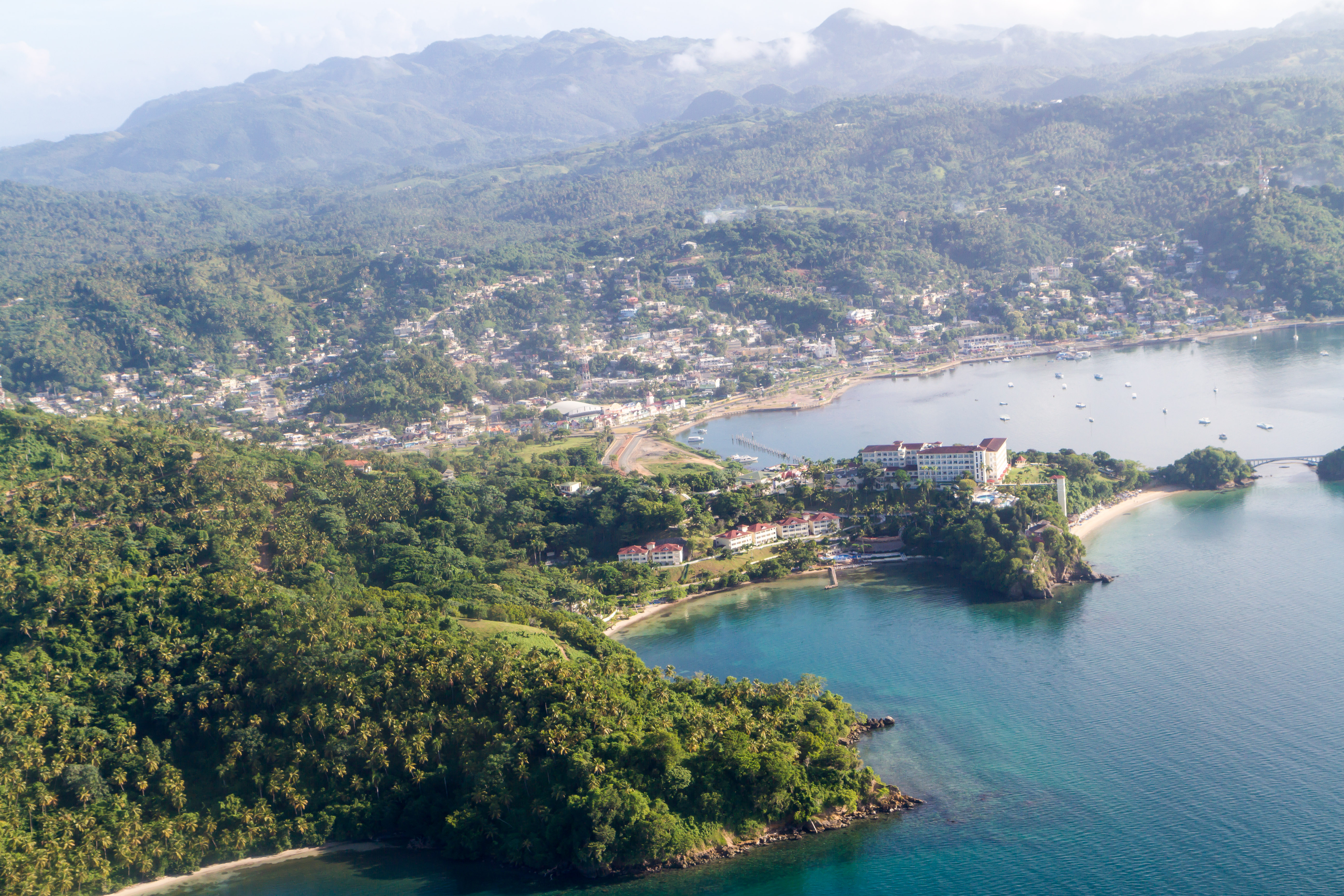
View of Samana Bay

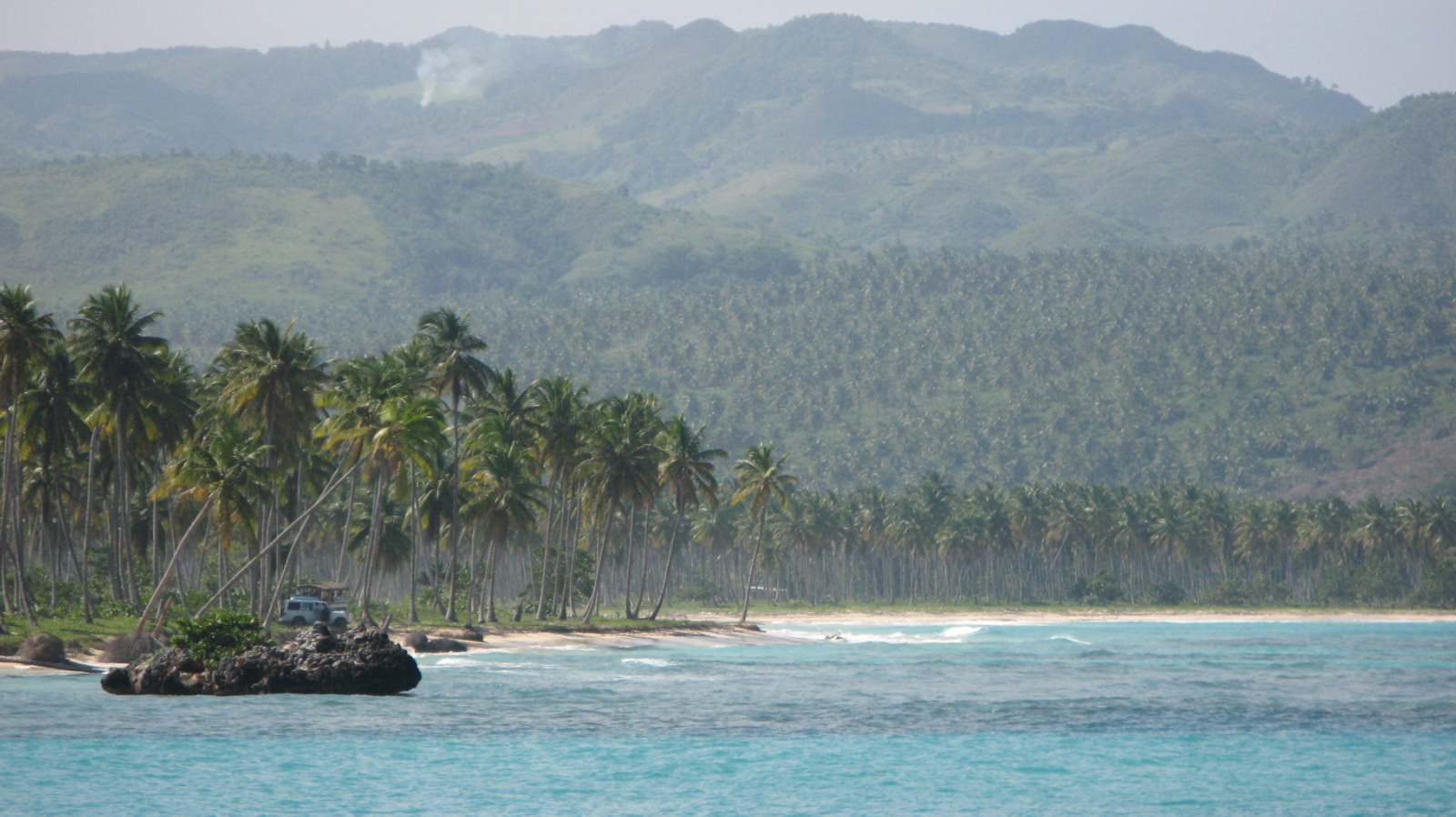
Rincon Bay

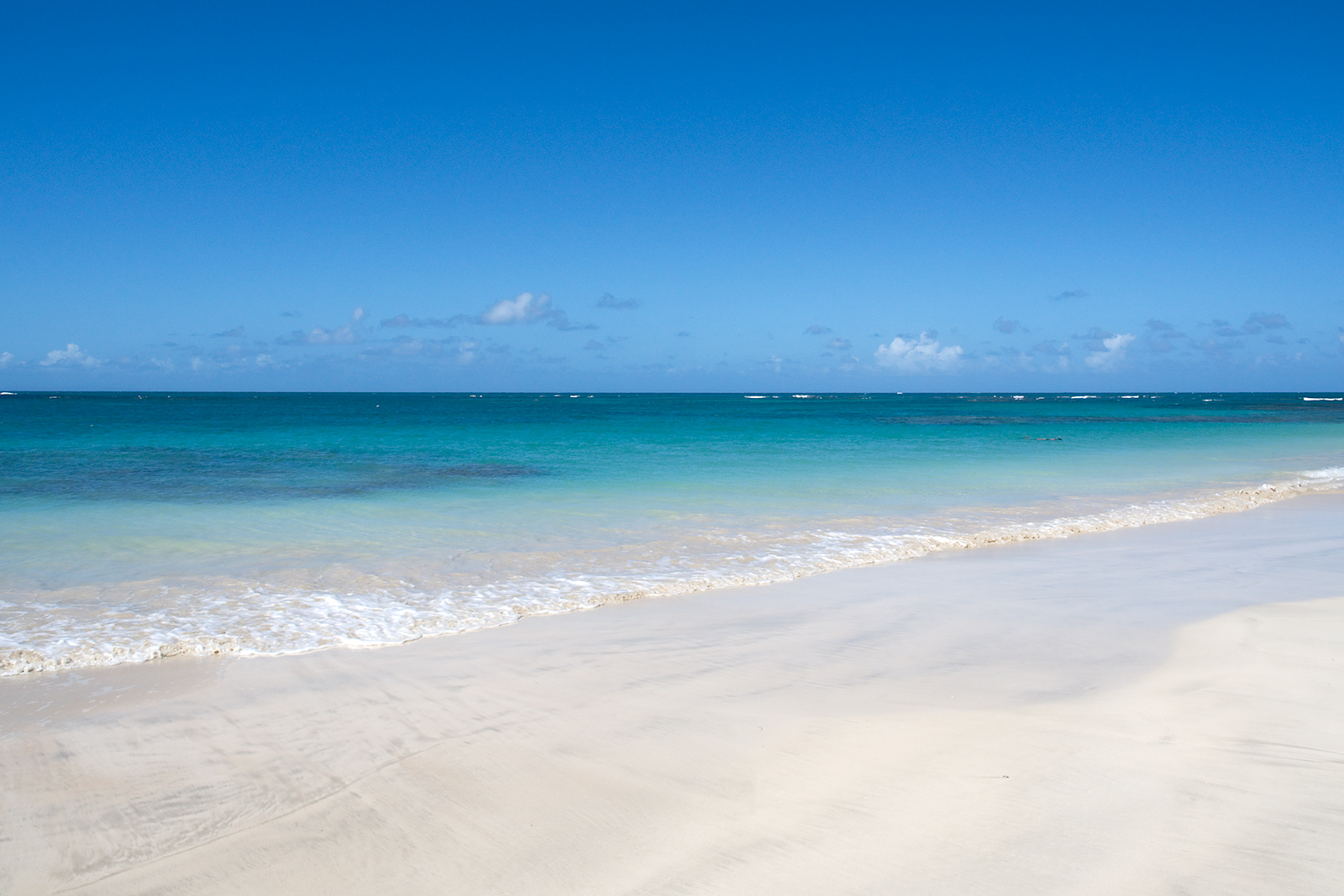
Beach in Las Terrenas

== History ==
Europeans landed and colonized Samaná on January 12, 1493. The explorer Christopher Columbus arrived in the area during his first trip to the Americas. He described it as “the fairest land on the face of the earth” after landing in the white sands of Bay of Rincón. At that time, Samaná was occupied by the Ciguayo tribe and the first hostile encounter between Europeans and natives occurred. This is considered to be the first instance of violent opposition to the Spanish conquistadors in the Americas, as they were attacked with a barrage of spears and arrows from the native warriors.

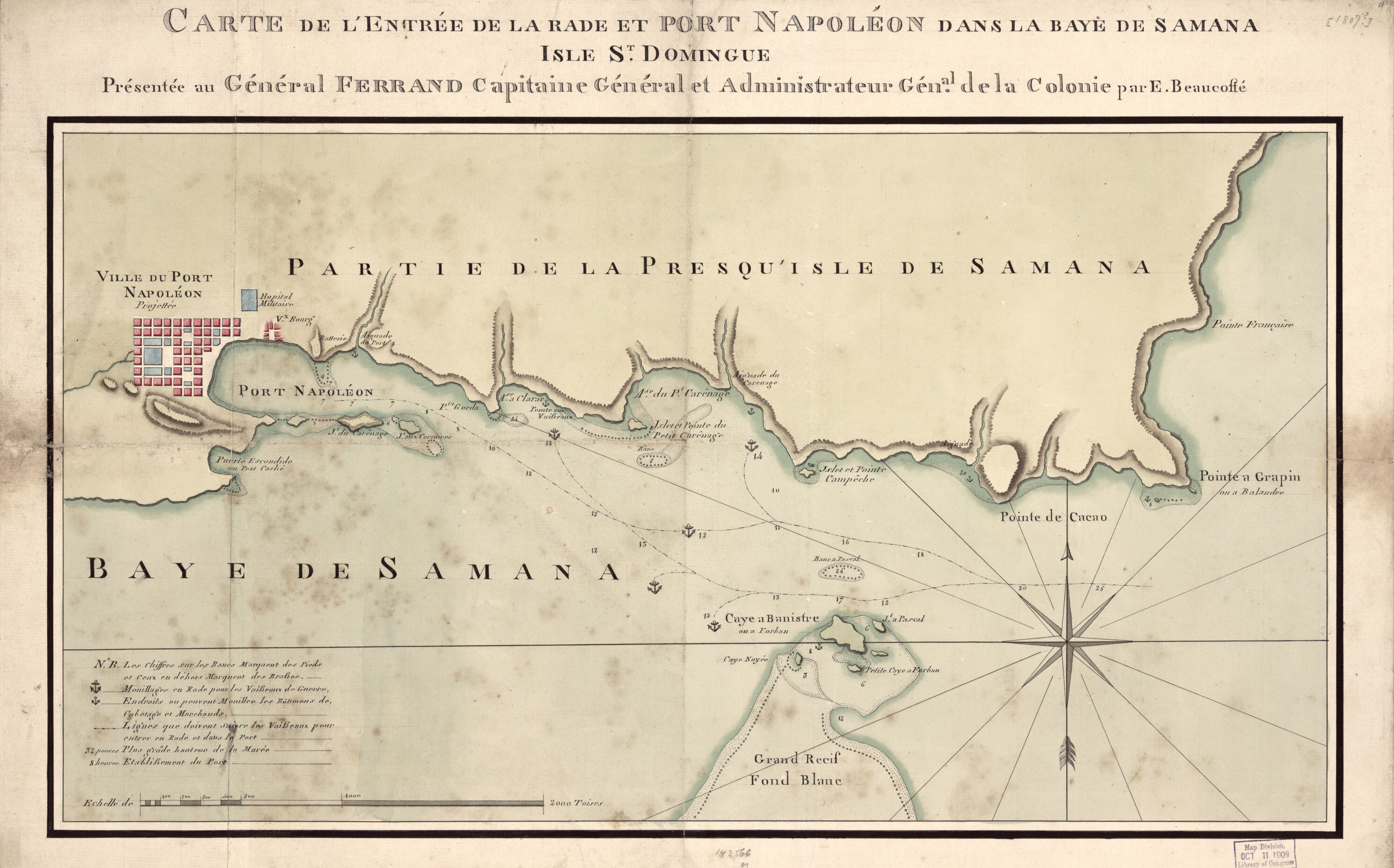
Historic map of the Samana Bay

During the 16th and 17th centuries, Samaná was sparsely populated and isolated from the capital Santo Domingo. The area was still inhabited by some Natives as well as "cimarrones" (escaped slaves), and European settlers who were trying to colonize the region. Among the Europeans, those who most frequented the area were English, Dutch, and the French. From time to time, but not continuously, the Spanish colonial authorities made expeditions to fight the French who were trying to occupy the region.

In 1756, the city of Santa Bárbara de Samaná was officially established, with European families mostly from the Canary Islands of southern Spain, in a place called Carenero Grande. The town was organized as a Parish of the La Vega Party, within the territorial division that the Captaincy General of Santo Domingo had then. Decades later when the area became a French colony, through the Treaty of Basel, the French governor of Jean-Louis Ferrand tried to develop the Samaná region, installing French settlers escaping the slave revolts in Haiti, including the family of Théodore Chassériau. These settlers were dedicated to cutting precious woods for export and growing coffee.

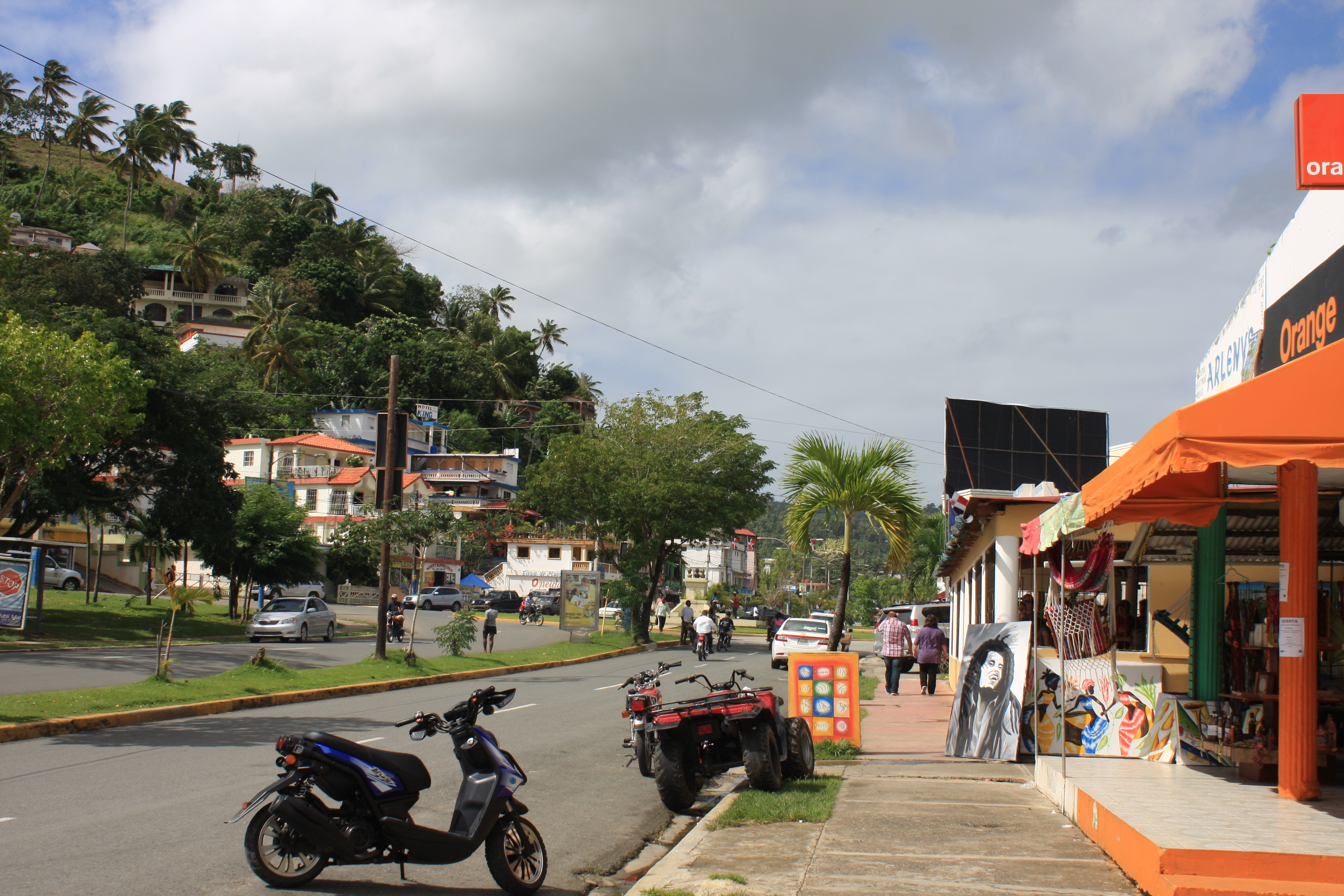
Santa Bárbara de Samaná

The province is also home to what are known Samaná Americans, the descendants of free black Americans immigrated beginning in 1824. They took advantage of the pro-African immigration policy of then president Jean-Pierre Boyer when Samaná was under Haitian rule. This migration to Santa Bárbara, Samaná began with 34 African-American families. Their culture contrasted with the Hispanic culture of the country as they maintain many elements of 19th century African-American culture—such as their brand of English, food, games, community organizations, English names, manners, music and some recipes that have been preserved as a result of their isolation, which until the 20th century was accessible only by boat. Most are of the African Methodist Episcopal and Wesleyan faith brought to the island by their ancestors.

During the entire First Republic (1844–1861) era, Samaná became the El Seibo Province. The Constitution of 1865 created the Maritime District of Samaná, with a military government, which later became the Province of Samaná by the Constitution of 1907 that stopped recognizing the maritime districts as a territorial category.

The territory of Samaná was originally larger, although the entire peninsula has always belonged to it. When it was created it covered both sides of the Samaná Bay, but then in 1938 Sabana de la Mar became part of the El Seibo province. When the Julia Molina province (currently María Trinidad Sánchez) was created in 1958, most of its territory was taken from Samaná. The last reduction was made in 1959 when Trujillo del Yuna (current Agua Santa del Yuna) was segregated to pass it to the municipality of Villa Riva in the Duarte Province.

== Economy ==
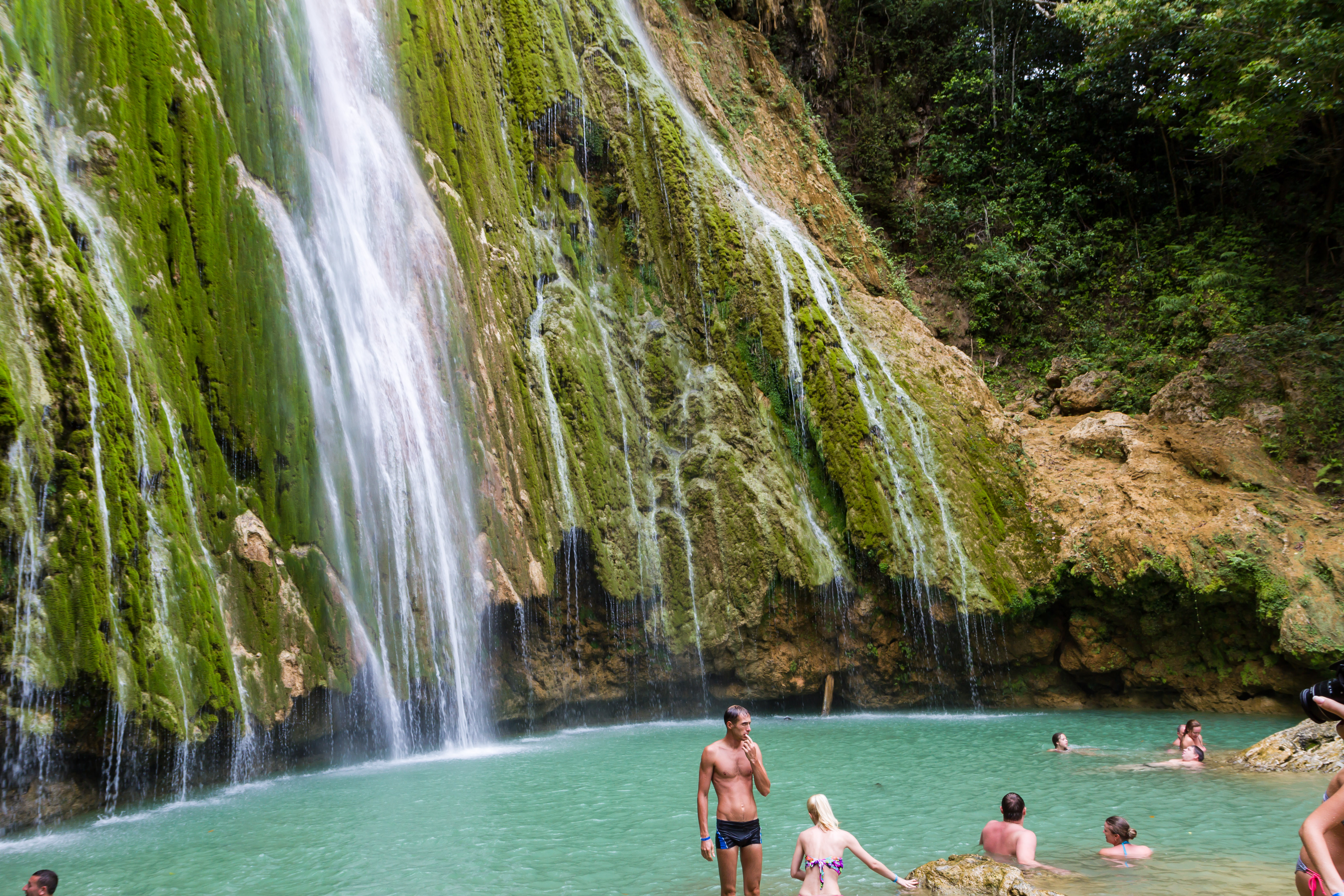
Waterfall in the Samaná Province

Fishing and agriculture have historically been the main source of income in Samana, and it is still the main coconut producer in the country. There is also some small mining activity in the more rugged areas of the province, producing marble. Lately tourism is becoming the main economic activity in the province due to its white sand beaches and clear waters. Samaná is one of the main tourist poles in the country.

Samaná is also one of the breeding places of the humpback whale, during winter and early spring, humpback whale watching is increasingly becoming an important income-generating activity for the province. Thousands of humpback whales come to the coast off Samaná from January to March.

== Municipalities and municipal districts ==
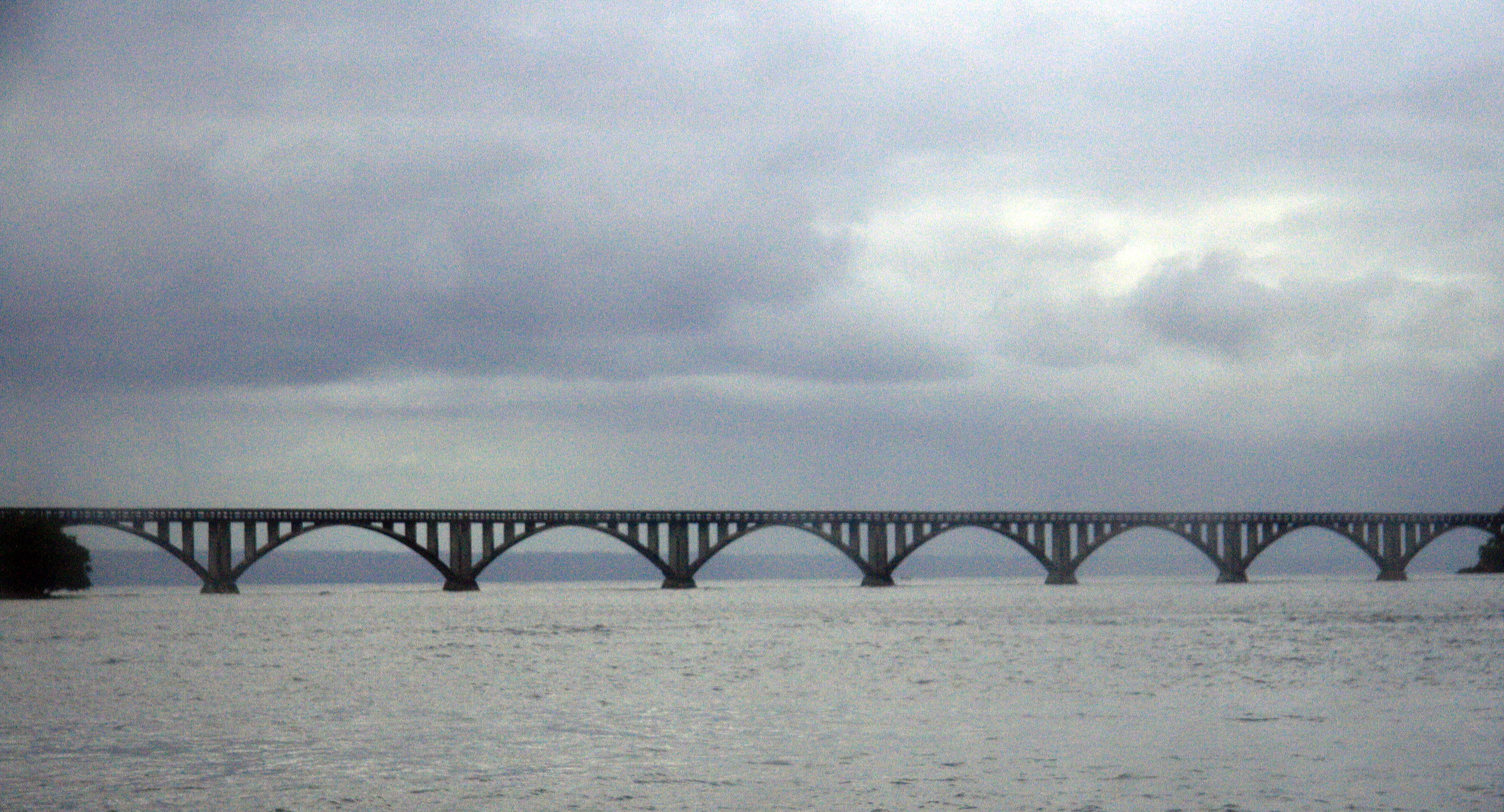
Bridge over Samana Bay

The province as of June 20, 2006 is divided into the following municipalities (municipios) and municipal districts (distrito municipal - D.M.) within them:

- Sánchez
- Samaná
  - Arroyo Barril (D.M.)
  - El Limón (D.M.)
  - Las Galeras (D.M.)
- Las Terrenas

The following is a sortable table of the municipalities with population figures as of an estimate on the 2012 census. Urban population are those living in the seats (cabeceras literally heads) of municipalities or of municipal districts. Rural population are those living in the districts (Secciones literally sections) and neighborhoods (Parajes literally places) outside of them.

Name	Total population	Urban population	Rural population
Las Terrenas	39,221	1,858	37,363
Santa Bárbara de Samaná	108,179	88,698	19,481
Sánchez	20,865	14,217	6,648
Samaná province	168,265	104,773	63,492

For comparison with the municipalities and municipal districts of other provinces see the list of municipalities and municipal districts of the Dominican Republic.

== Transportation ==
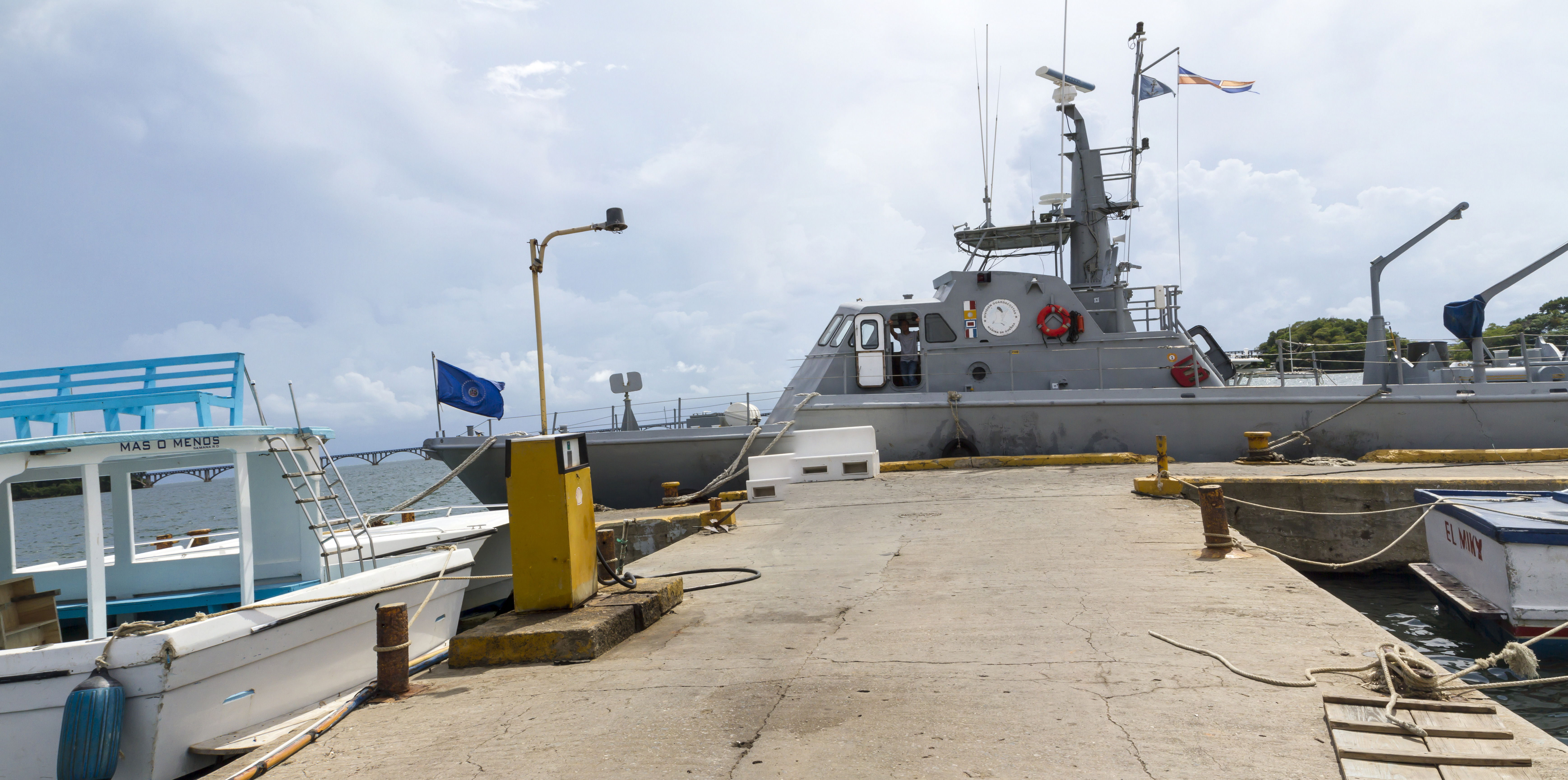
Avenida La Marina

A highway connecting the Samaná peninsula to Santo Domingo opened to the public in 2008. It more than halved the driving time from 4 hours to 1.5 hours as it is a straight 120 kilometres (75 mi), connecting from just east of Santo Domingo (near the SDQ airport) to just west of Sanchez.

There is a significant tourist development evident throughout the Samaná peninsula, particularly that of large all-inclusive resorts, in anticipation of the increased tourism to follow the road's completion. On 6 November 2006 the Samaná El Catey International Airport started operations. Samaná has three airports and one harbor.

Airports

- El Portillo Airport, Located in El Portillo, Samaná.
- Arroyo Barril Airport, Located in Arroyo Barril, Samaná.
- Samaná El Catey International Airport, Located in Sanchez, Samaná

Port

- Cayo Levantado Port, located in Arroyo Barril, near Arroyo Barril International Airport, Samaná.

== Gallery ==
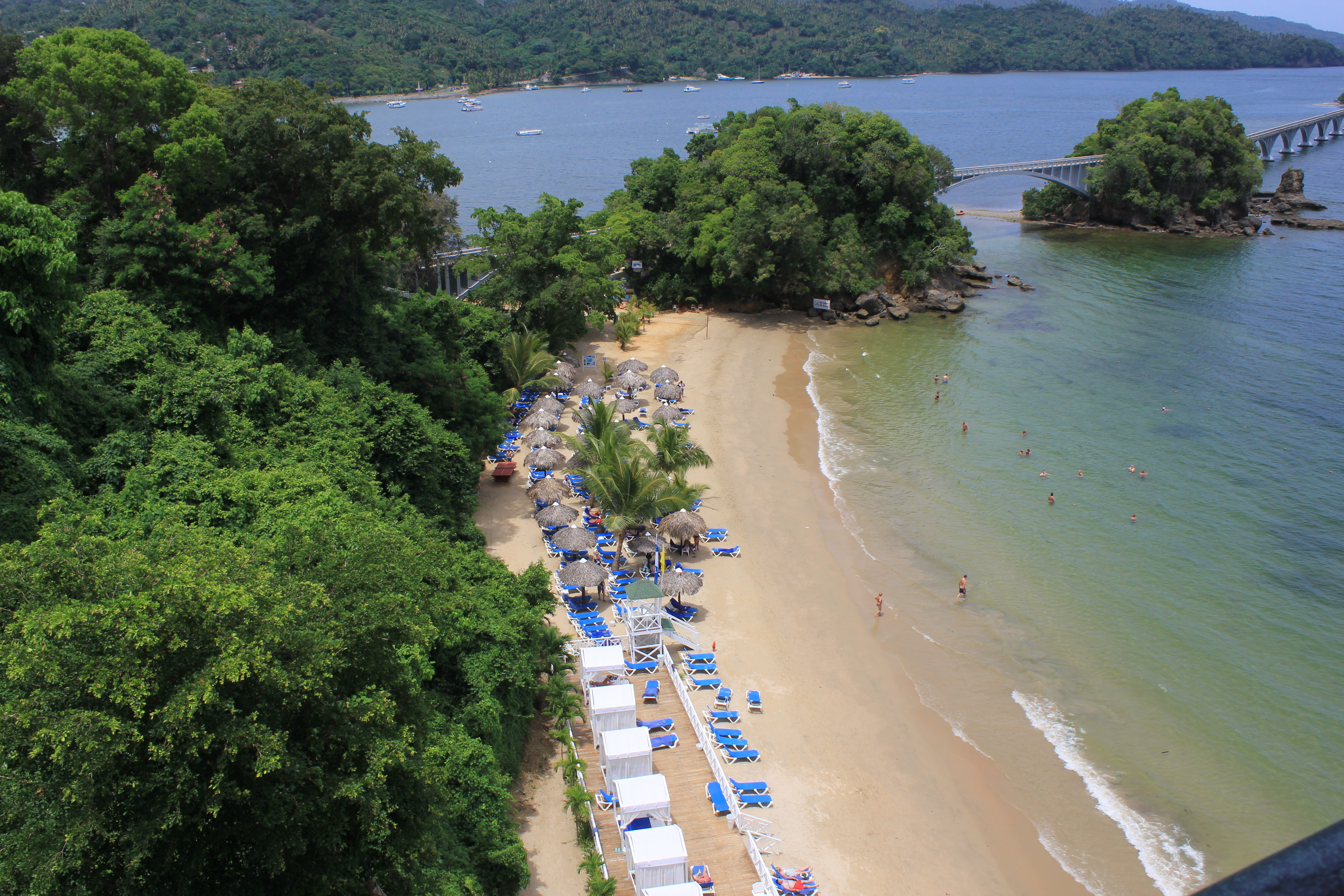
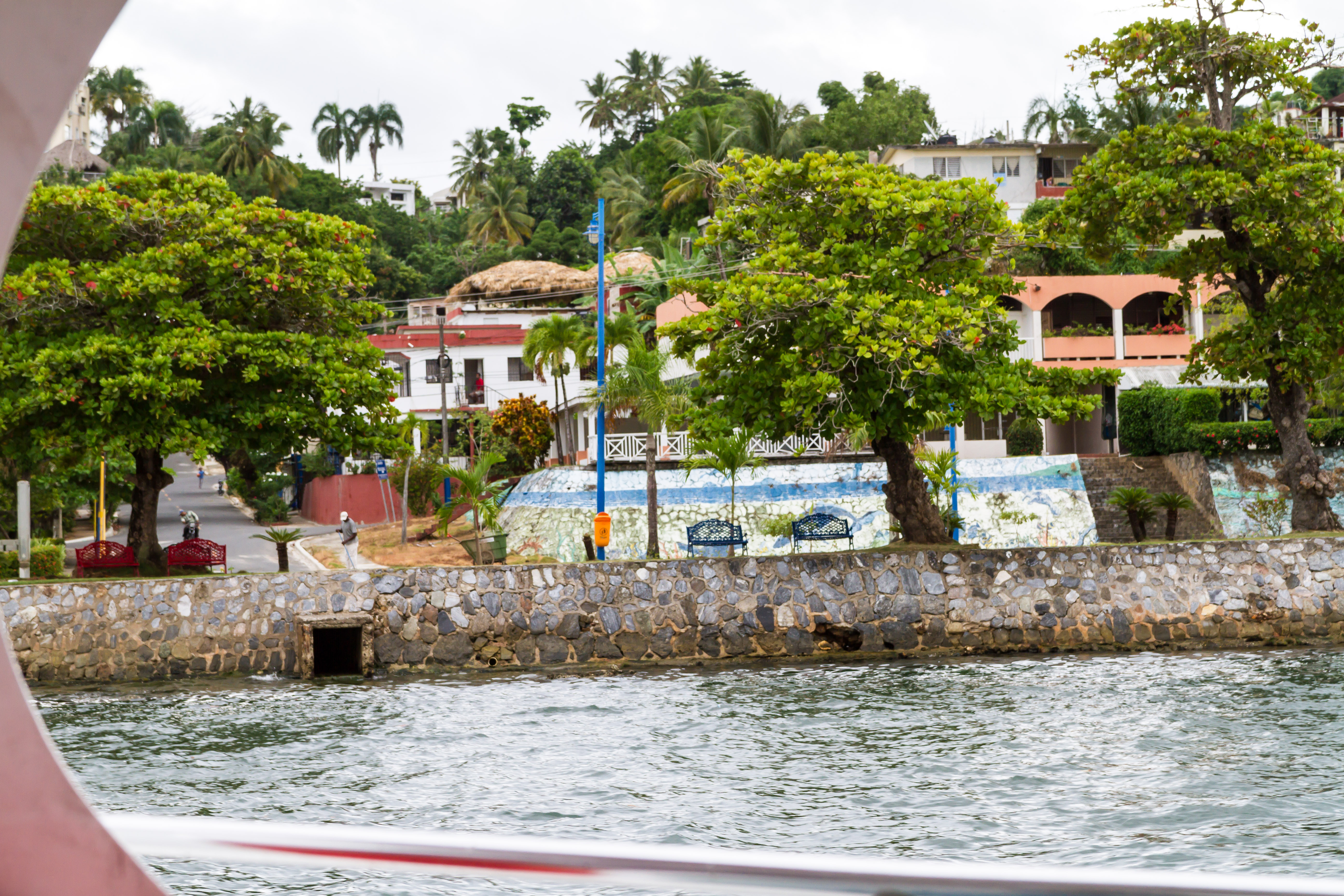
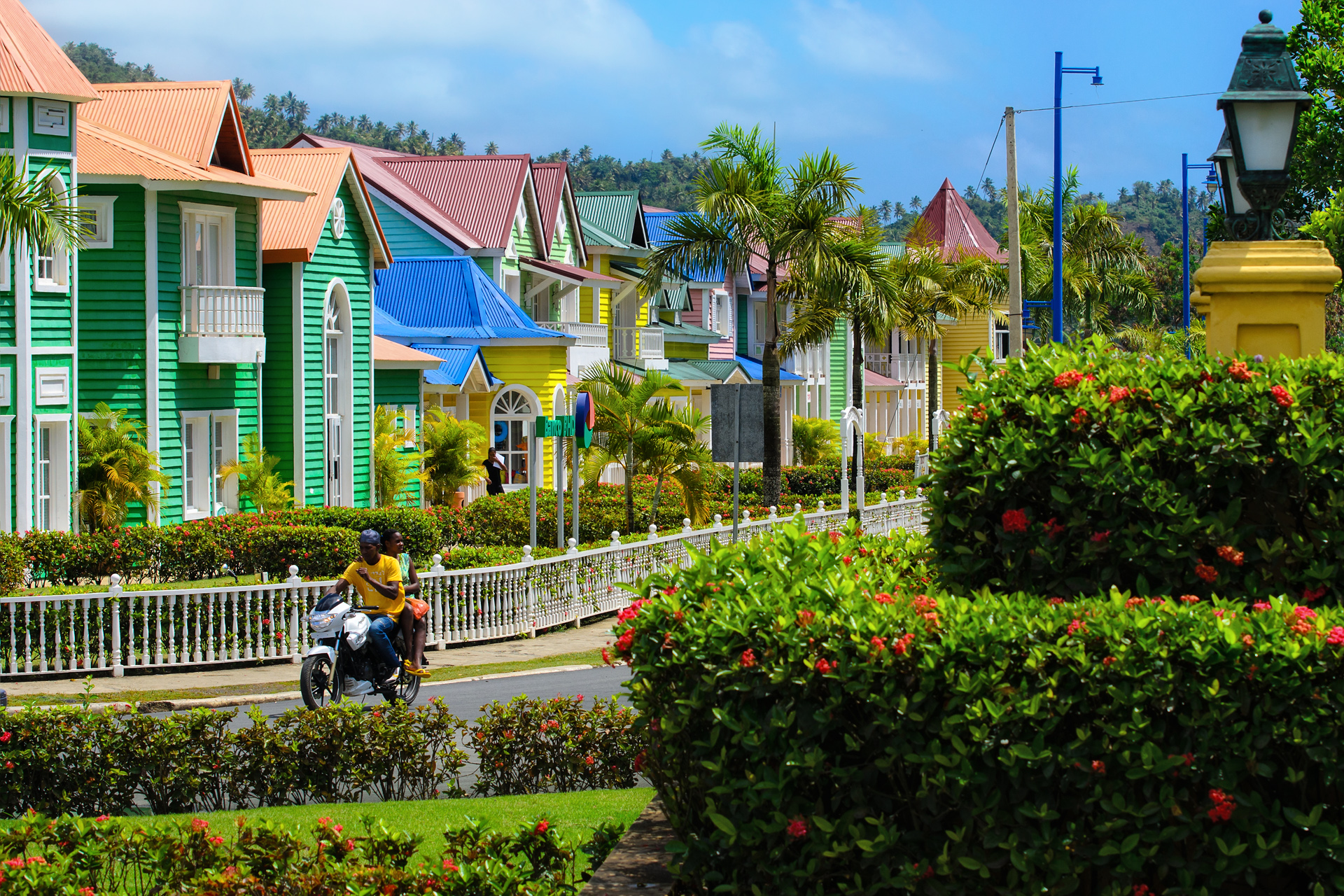
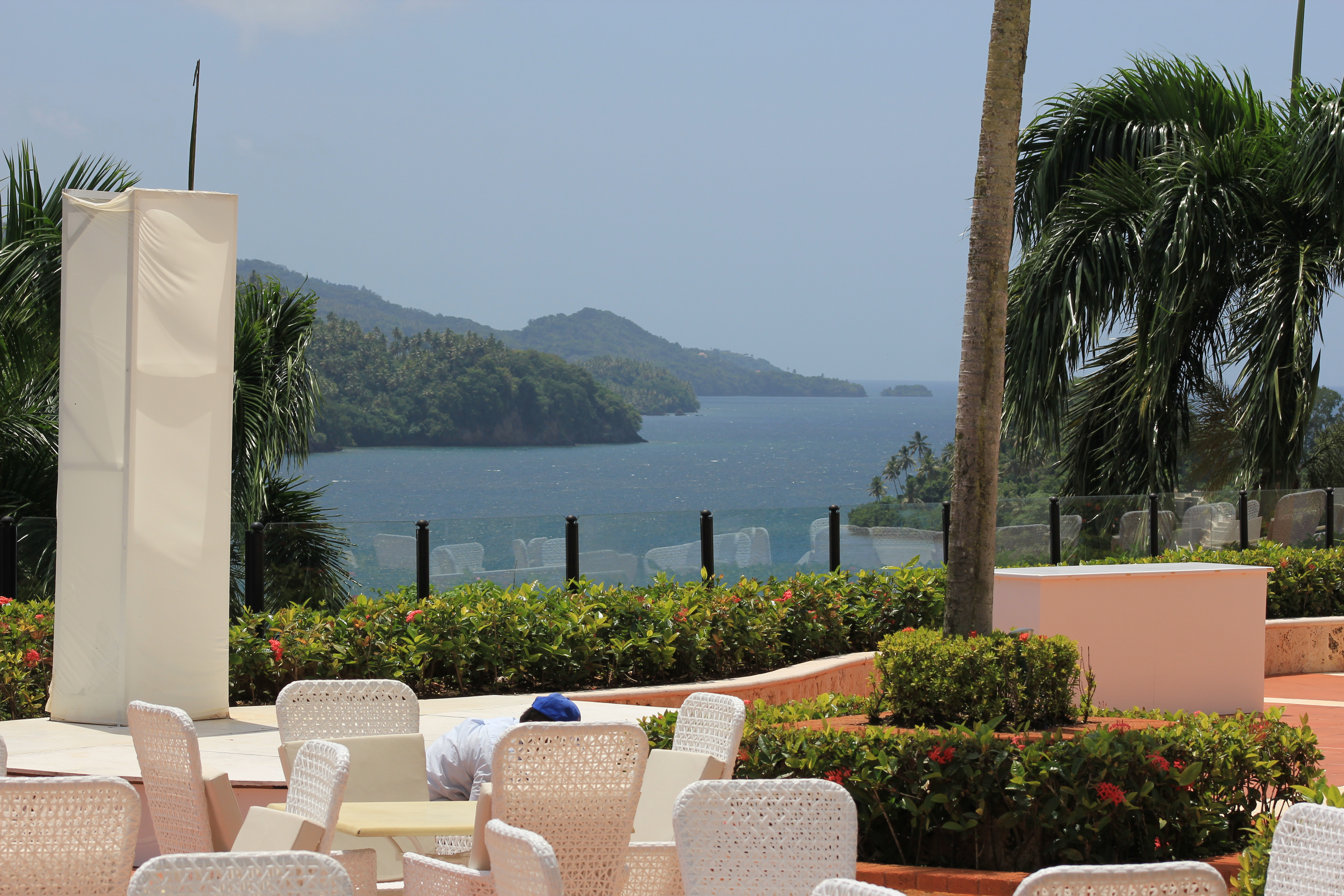
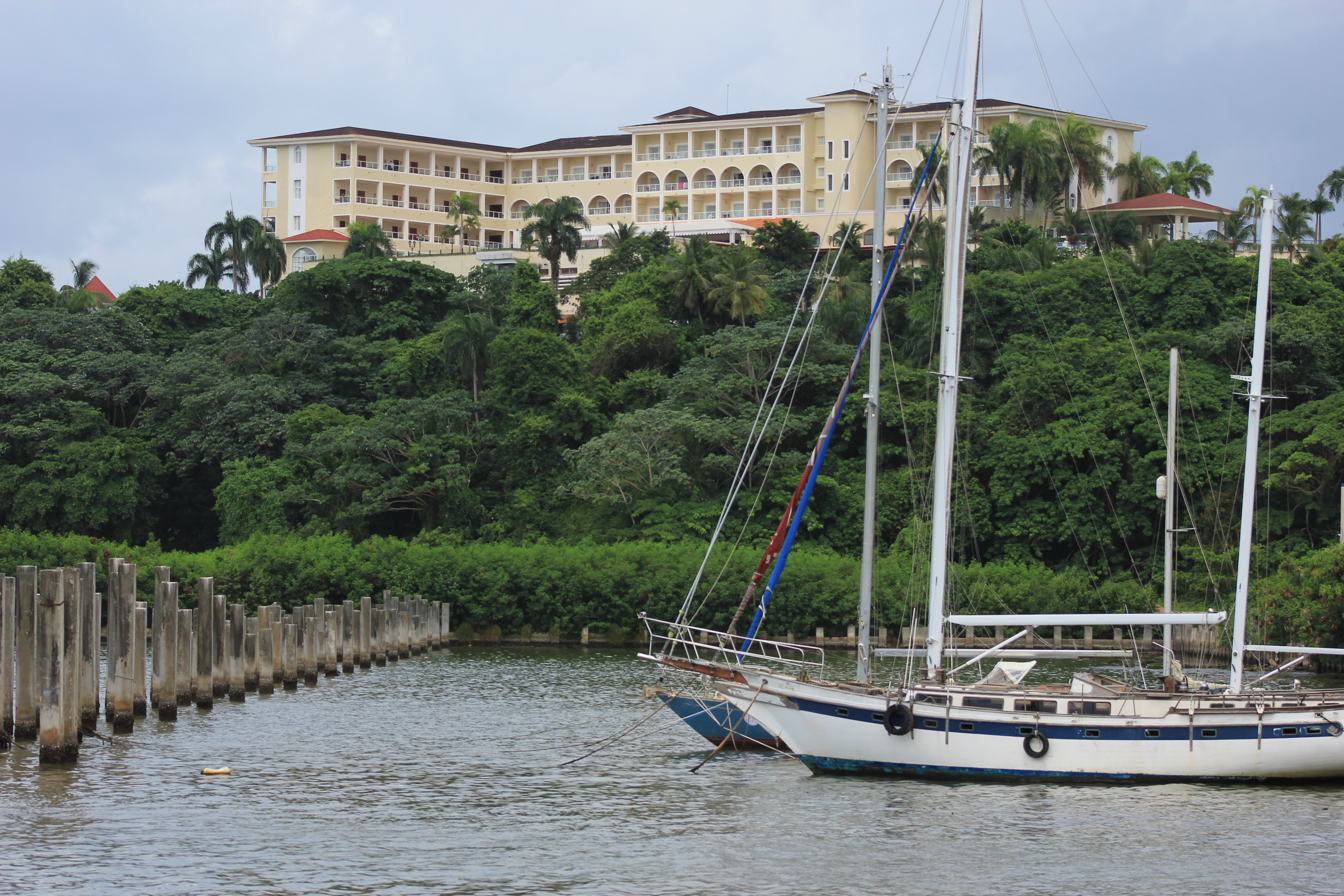
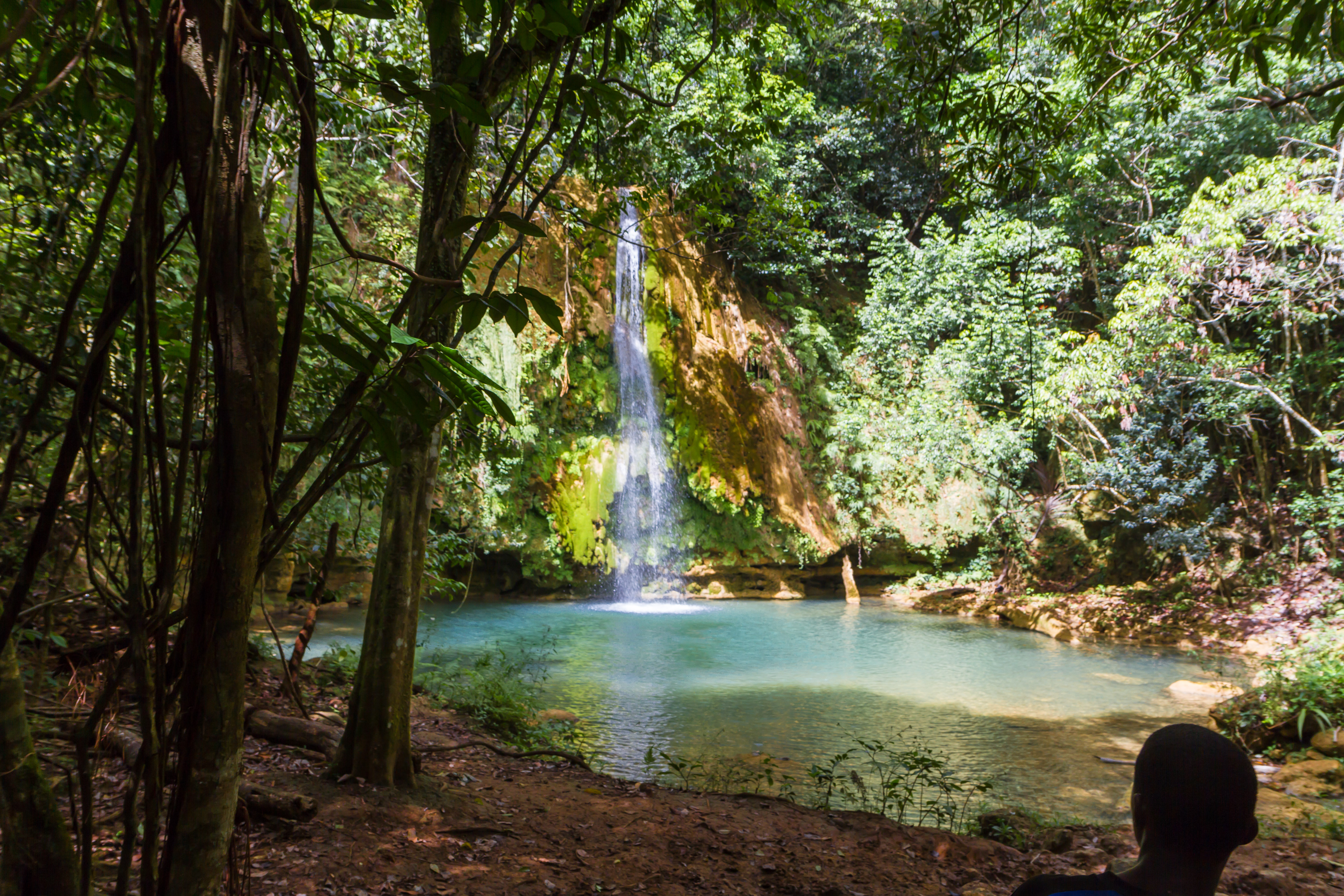
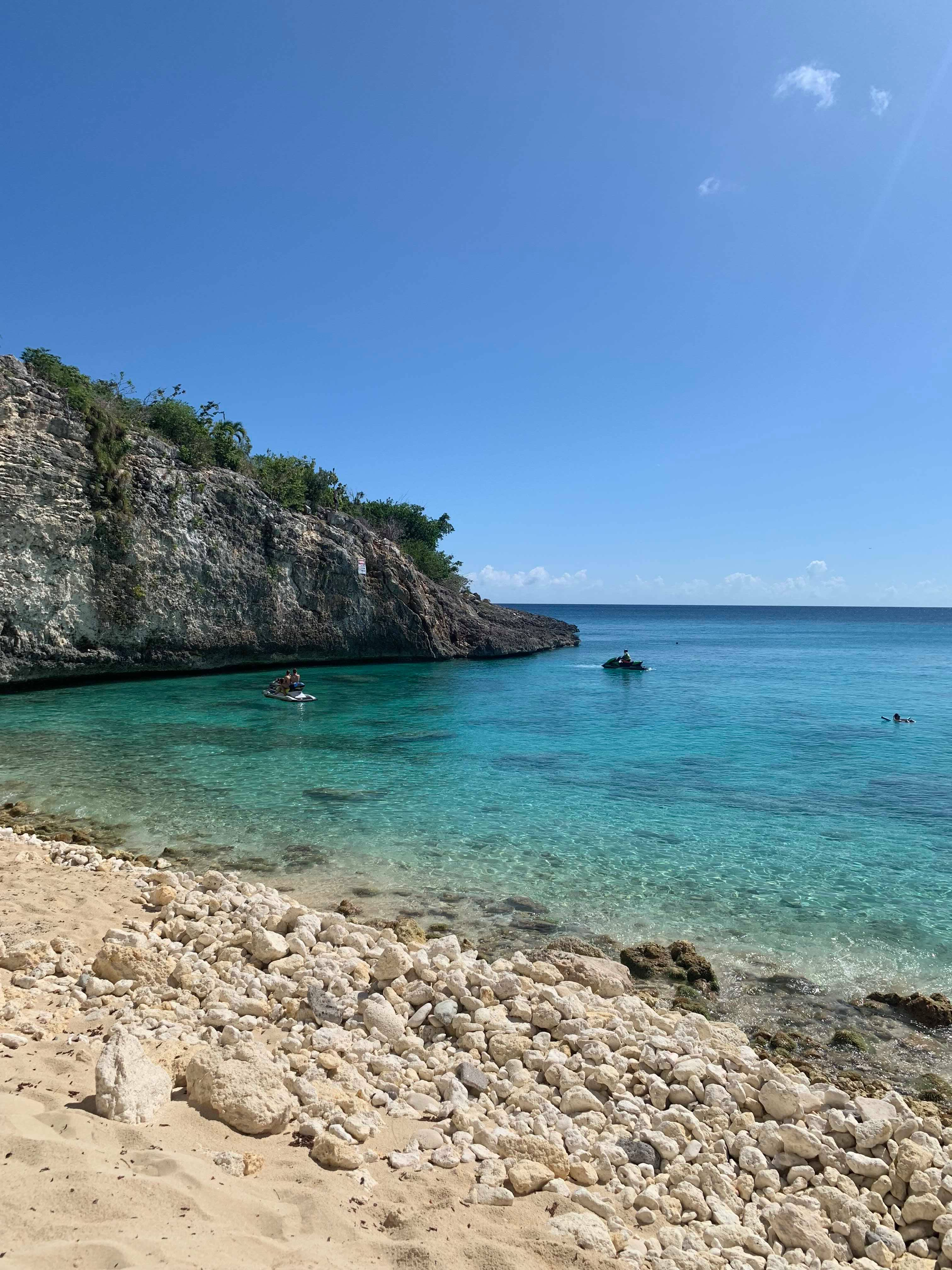
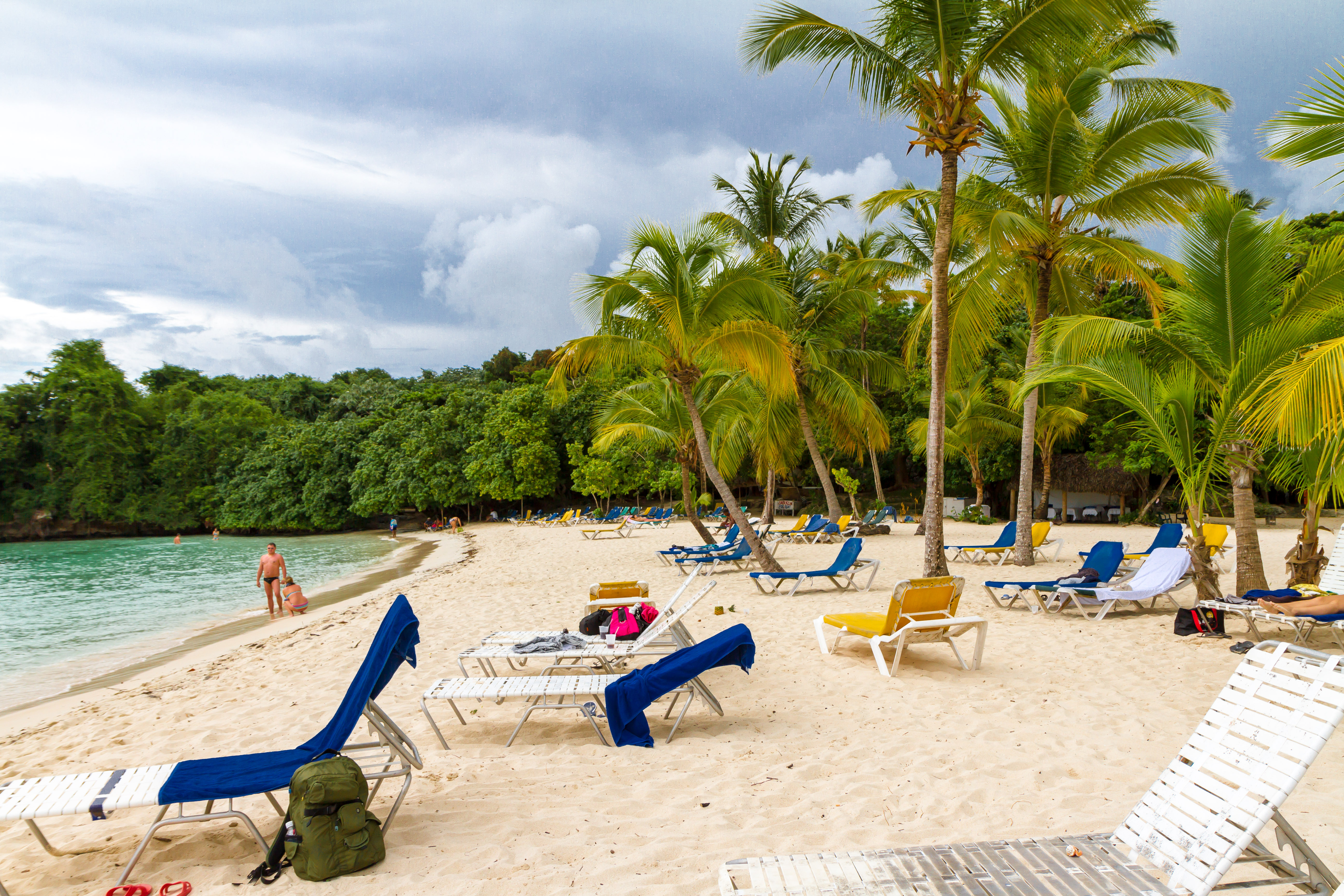
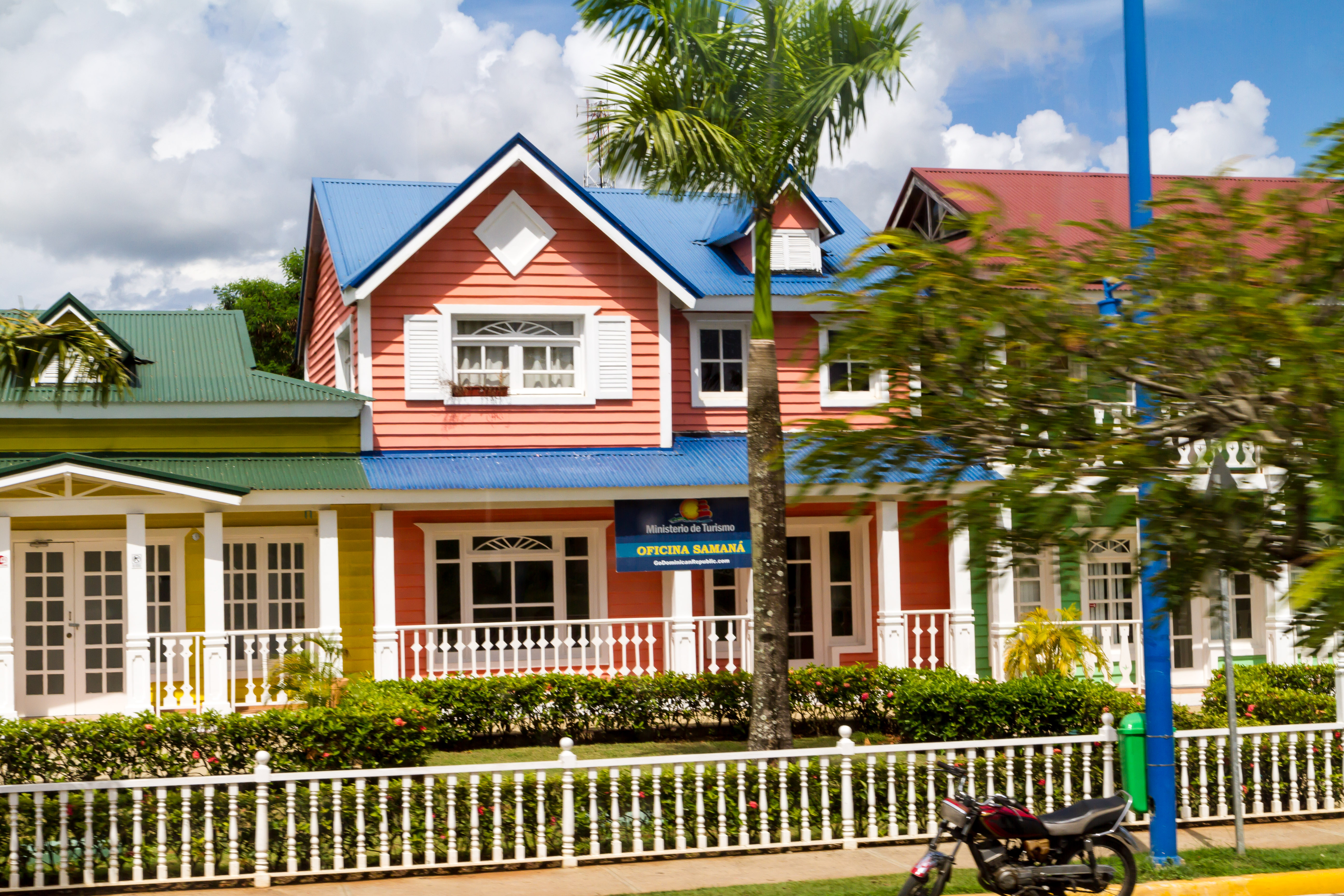
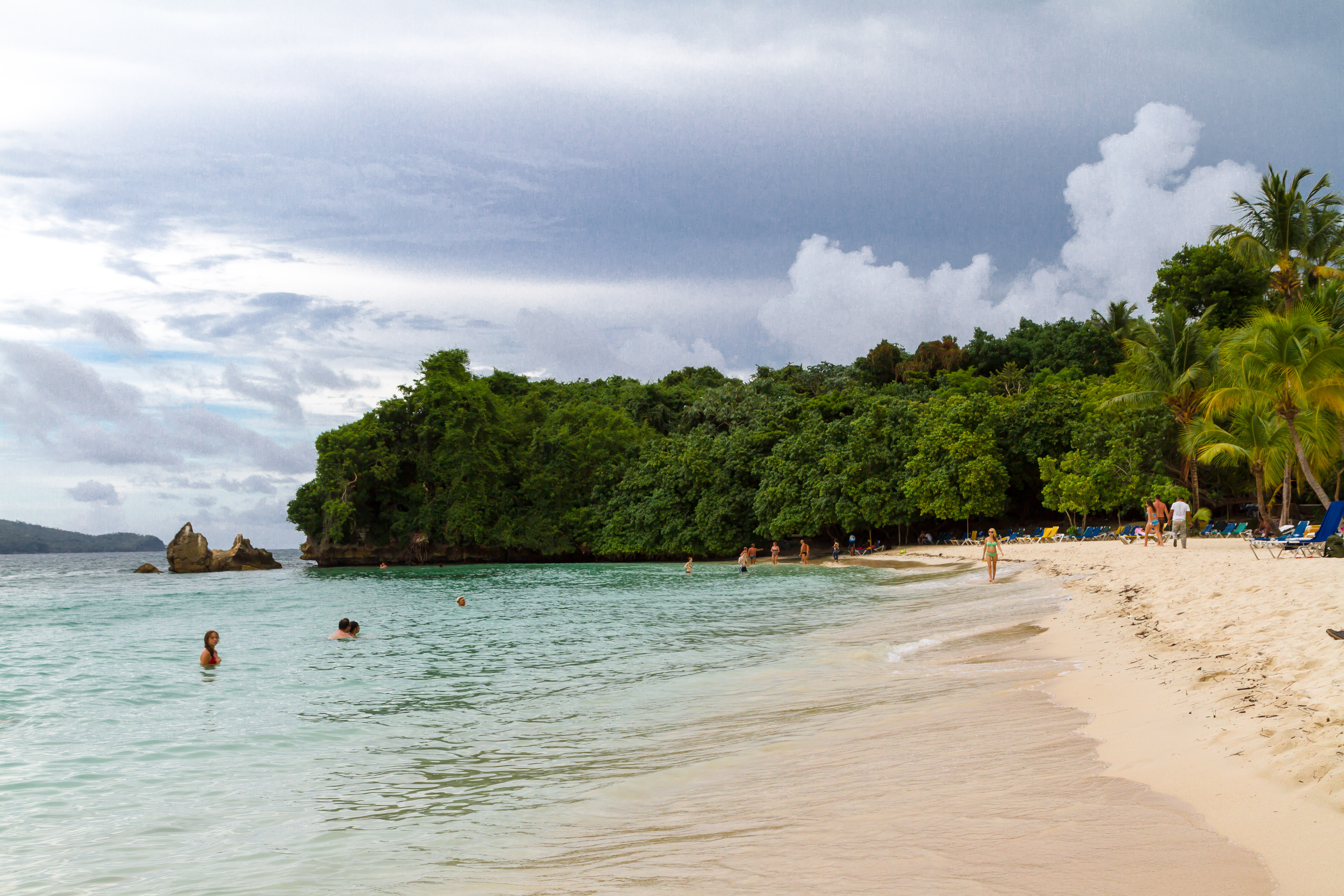
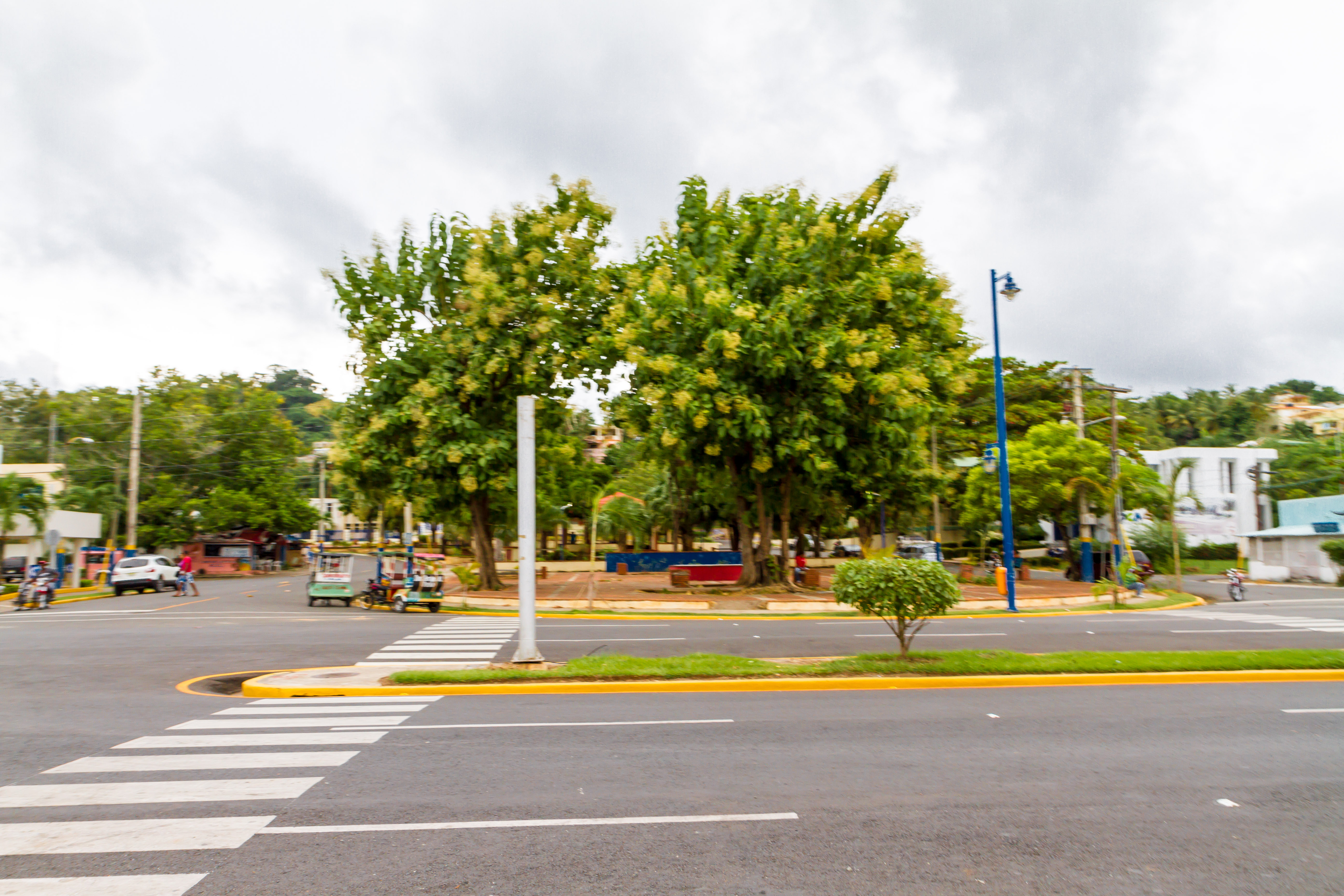
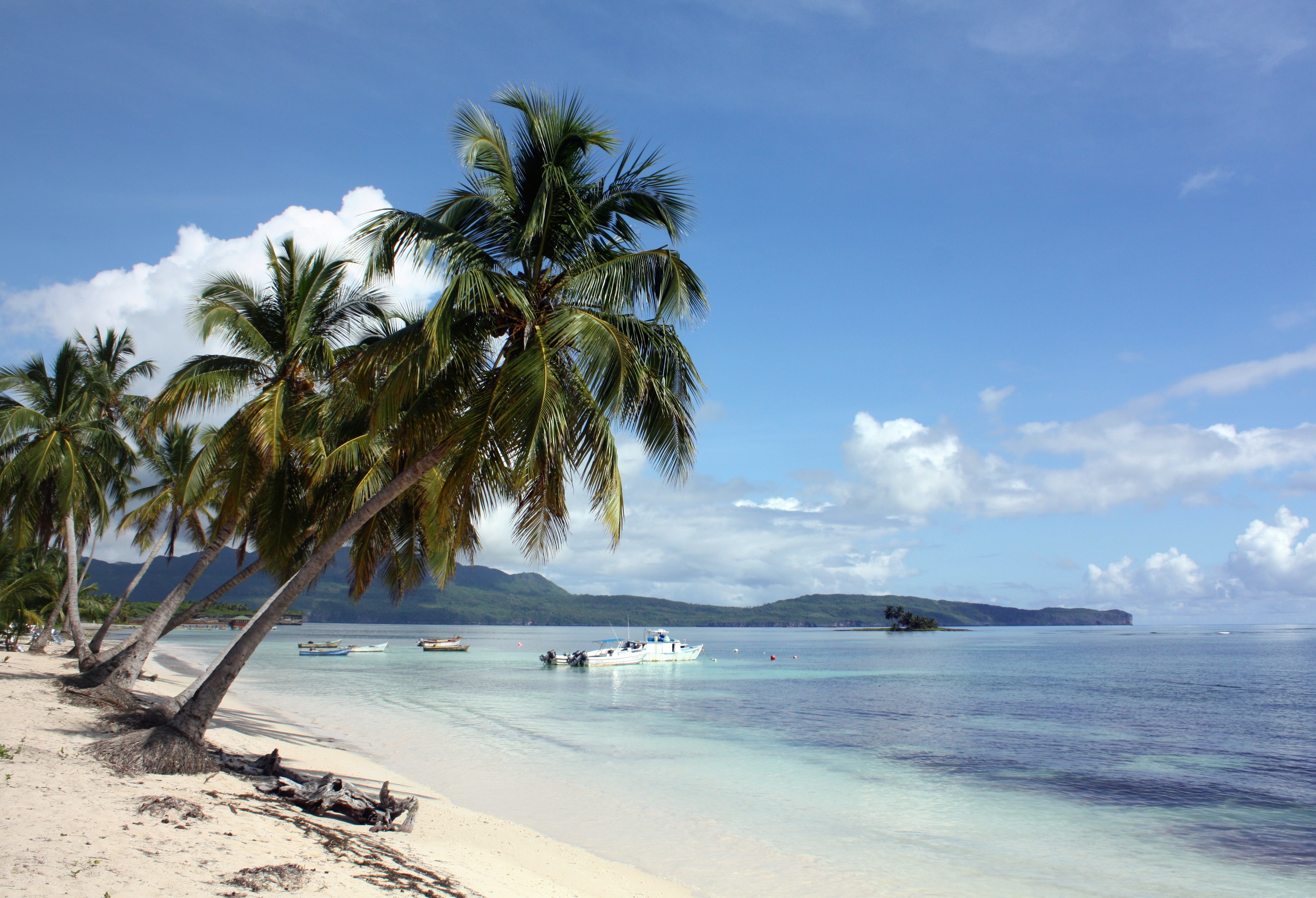

== See also ==
- Samaná Bay
- Samaná English
- Samaná Peninsula

== Sources ==
- Familias de Samaná, Sabana de la Mar y Sanchez, genealogia, historia
