= Las Galeras =

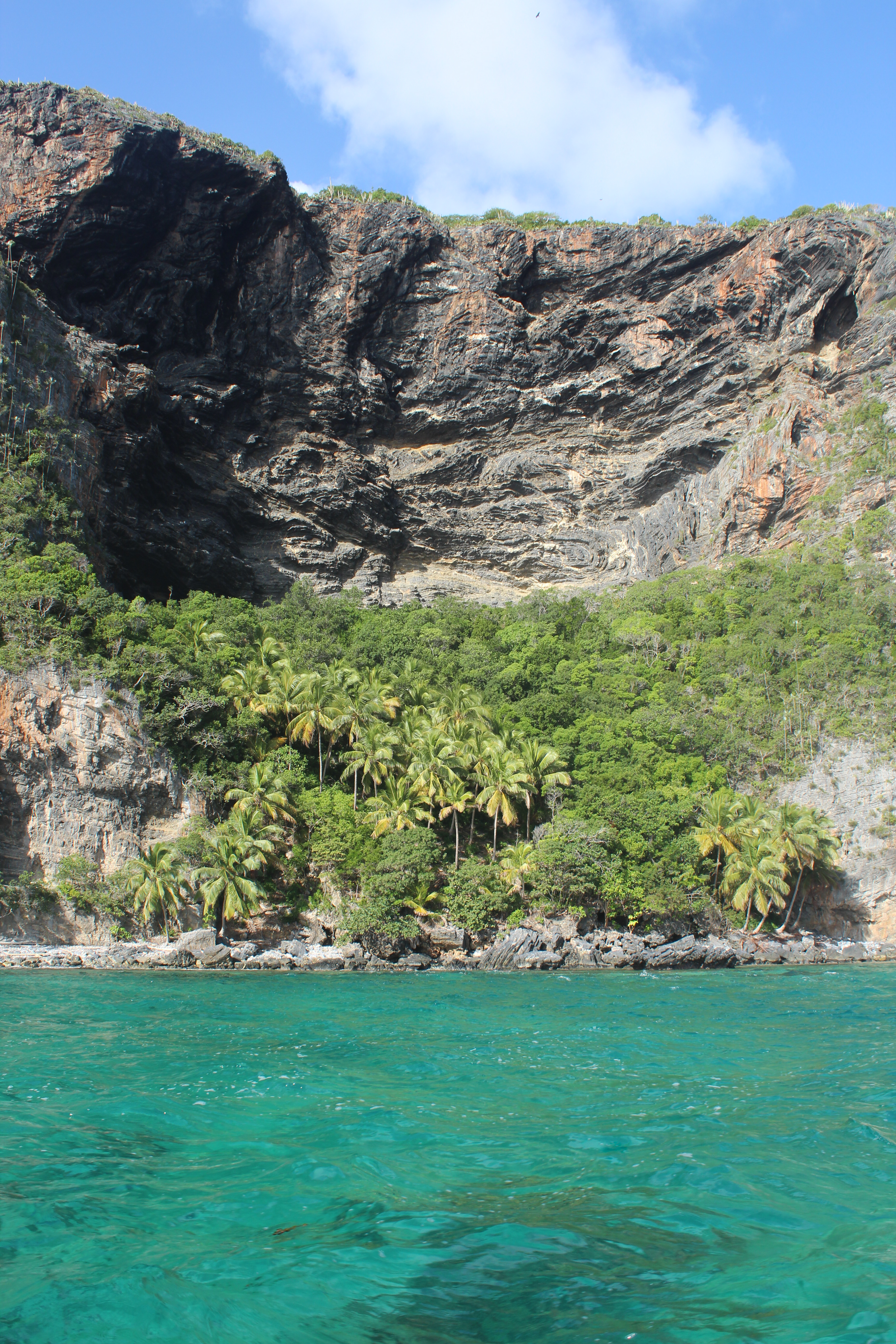
- Playa Fronton in Las Galeras

- Las Galeras in the Dominican Republic
- Coordinates: 19°18′N 69°12′W
- Country: Dominican Republic
- Province: Samaná

Area
  - Total: 127.38 km^{2} (49.18 sq mi)

Population (2002)
  - Total: 6,000
  - Density: 47/km^{2} (120/sq mi)

Las Galeras is a municipal district of the provincial capital Santa Bárbara de Samaná, Samaná Province, on the northeast coast of the Dominican Republic, at the eastern end of the Samaná Peninsula, on Rincón Bay between Cabrón and Samaná capes.

Las Galeras (Spanish for "The Galleys") is named for two galleys that were there in the 16th century.

== Population ==
In the national census of 2002 the population of Las Galeras was included with that of Santa Bárbara de Samaná. There were approximately 6,000 people living in the area of Las Galeras.

== See also ==
Samana Province
