= El Limón, Samaná =

Coordinates: 19.292288°N 69.430820°W

Waterfall in El Limón, Samaná

El Limón (in English, The Lemon) is a municipal district of Santa Bárbara de Samaná, Samaná Province, Dominican Republic. It is on the north coast of the Samaná Peninsula, on the Atlantic coast.

There are other two municipal districts with the same name (El Limón) in the country: one in the Independencia province and the other in the Santiago province.

== Population ==
In the last national census (2002), the population of El Limón is included with that of the city of Samaná.

== Geography ==
El Limón district has a variety of mountains such as the Ermitaño Mountain, the Sugarloaf Mountain, the Spring Hill, among others. Between the road that connects El Limon with the municipality of Samana is the coffee hill which was paved in 2000.

Among its rivers, the most important is the Limon river, whose channel crosses the entire municipal district, dividing it in two, until it empties into the Atlantic Ocean. Other rivers such as the stream, the spring, among others have been greatly affected by the indiscriminate reforestation of the forests.

== Economy ==
The most important economic activities of the province are agriculture, fishing and tourism. Tourism, above all nature tourism, is important here because many tourists visit El Limón Waterfall. El Limón is also one of the main producers of yams, sweet potatoes, and good bread in the country. Coconut production is the most prominent, although it has declined in recent years.

== Notable people ==
- Théodore Chassériau, a French painter, was born in El Limón in 1819.
