= Laguna Salada =

- Coat of arms

- Laguna Salada in the Dominican Republic
- Coordinates: 19°39′0″N 71°05′0″W
- Country: Dominican Republic
- Province: Valverde

Area
  - Total: 184.54 km^{2} (71.25 sq mi)

Population (2012)
  - Total: 30,041
  - Density: 162.79/km^{2} (421.62/sq mi)
  - Urban: 20,470
- Demonym: Laguna Saladense
- Municipal Districts: 3

Laguna Salada (Spanish pronunciation: [laˈɣuna saˈlaða], Salt Lake) is a municipality (municipio) of the Valverde province in the Dominican Republic. Within the municipality there are three municipal districts (distritos municipal): Cruce de Guayacanes, Jaibón and La Caya.

== Geography ==
Laguna Salada borders the Septentrional mountain range to the north (which separates it from Puerto Plata), the Yaque del Norte River to the south (which separates it from Mao), the Maizal and Boca de Mao municipal districts to the east (which separate it from Esperanza) and Guayubín to the west (which separates it from the Monte Cristi province).

== Economy ==
Agriculture is the main economic activity in Laguna Salada, since its terrains are fit for growing a variety of crops such as rice, banana, cassava, peppers, onions, sweet potato, coffee, cacao, among others. Tobacco and sorghum are also cultivated.

The most important crop have been the banana; banana is harvest and exported to Europe and United States of America since 2005.

Other economic activities include cattle ranches, industry and commerce. There are various dairy product industries in the municipality, as well a coffee factory, bakeries, carpentry shops, cement block factories, gas stations, repair shops, hardware stores, warehouses, among others.

The municipality's economically active population (PEA) consists of 7,096 people, out of which 4,832 (or 68%) are currently employed. Of those that are employed, 270 (or 6%) work as public servants.

== Notable residents ==
Birthplace of Major League Baseball player Wily Modesto ("Wily Mo") Peña.

Birthplace of one of the most important Politician in Dominican Republic José Francisco Peña Gómez deceased in 1998.
