= Esperanza, Dominican Republic =

Esperanza
- Esperanza in the Dominican Republic
- Coordinates: 19°34′48″N 70°59′24″W
- Country: Dominican Republic
- Province: Valverde
- Found: September 9, 1907

Area
  - Total: 215.24 km^{2} (83.10 sq mi)
- Elevation: 95 m (312 ft)

Population (2012)
  - Total: 70,588
  - Density: 327.95/km^{2} (849.39/sq mi)
  - Urban: 52,732
- Distance to – Mao: 16 km
- Municipal Districts: 4

Esperanza is a municipality (municipio) of the Valverde province in the Dominican Republic. Within the municipality there are four municipal districts (distritos municipal): Boca de Mao, Jicomé, Maizal and Paradero.

As of the 2002 census the municipality had a total population of 70,588 inhabitants, 52,732 living in its urban settlements and 17,856 in its rural districts (Secciones). For comparison with other municipalities and municipal districts see the list of municipalities and municipal districts of the Dominican Republic.

== History ==
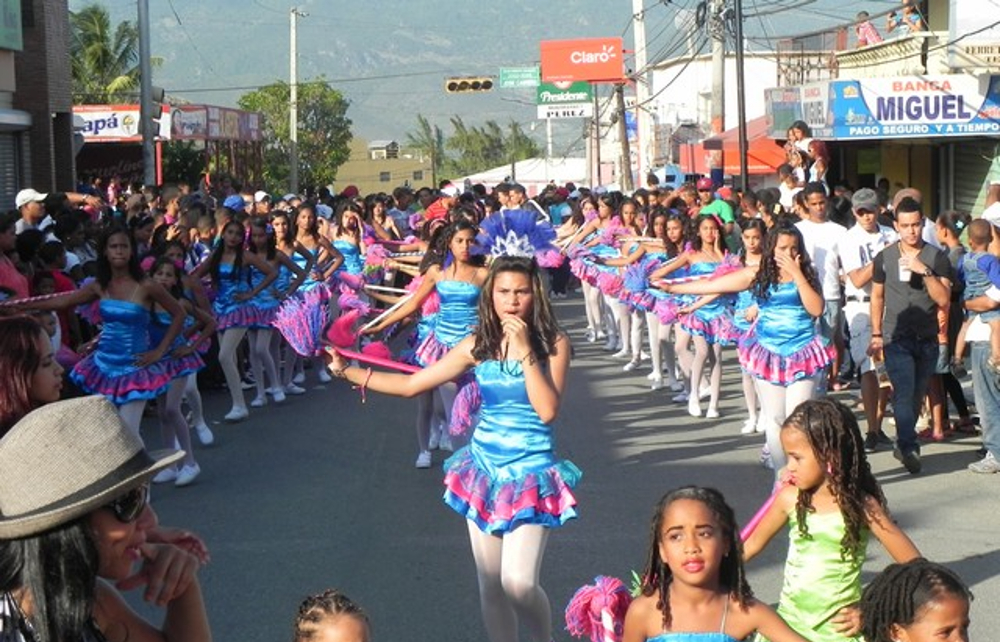
Esperanza Dominican Republic town parade.

A village founded in 1495 on the lands of Cacique Caonabo, it ceased to exist for a century and a farmhouse and a herd reappeared at the beginning of the 17th century.

When the cities of Guajaba, Puerto Real de Bayajá, and Monte Cristi were destroyed during the government of Antonio Osorio, this population was forced to emigrate to the southern part of the country and those who did not accept this order founded the Hato Esperanza, among others, this being the place occupied by the Municipality of Esperanza today.

It is from the first decades of the 19th century when it begins to have a nuance of more organized settlers in small scattered groups, and in the mid-1900s with the installation of the Esperanza mill, it becomes even more organized, in Esperanza Caña and Esperanza Pueblo.

On June 19, 1875, the Hato de Esperanza was elevated to a Cantonal Post, depending on the province of Santiago de los Caballeros, through decree No. 1433; later it is converted into Common of the same province, when the political constitution of September 9, 1907, was dictated, which abolished the name of Cantonal Post.

The conversion of Esperanza into a Cantonal Post originated from a request raised by the inhabitants of the town and section, addressed to the National Congress supported by the governor of the province of Santiago.

When the province of Valverde was created through Law 4882 of March 27, 1958, the municipality was segregated from the Province of Santiago de los Caballeros as of January 1, 1959 and became part of the new province.

== Notable people ==
- José Leclerc (born 1993), Major League Baseball Pitcher
- Seranthony Domínguez (born 1994), Major League Baseball pitcher
- Giselle Tavera (born 1993), bachata singer
- David Ortiz (born 1975 Santo Domingo), Major League Baseball first baseman
- Hector Noesi (born 1987), Major League Baseball pitcher
- Jhoan Durán (born 1998), Major League Baseball pitcher
- Jasson Domínguez (born 2003), Major League Baseball player
