= Jasson Domínguez =

Dominican baseball player (born 2003)

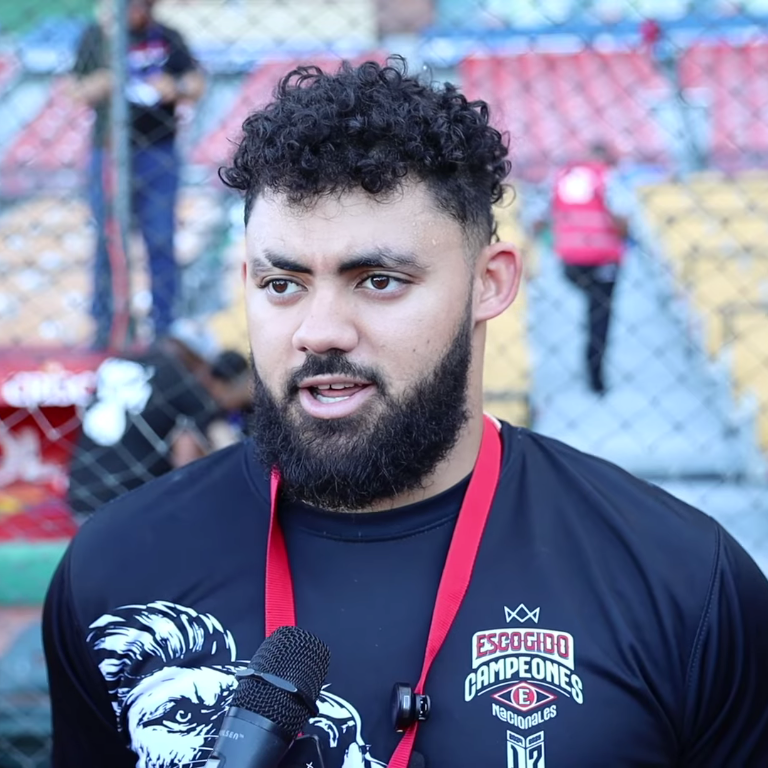
- Domínguez with the Leones del Escogido in 2025

New York Yankees – No. 24
- Outfielder
- Born: February 7, 2003 (age 23); Esperanza, Dominican Republic
- Bats: Switch Throws: Right

MLB debut
- September 1, 2023, for the New York Yankees

MLB statistics (through 2026 season)
- Batting average: .241
- Home runs: 22
- Runs batted in: 72
- Stats at Baseball Reference

Teams
- New York Yankees (2023–present)

Jasson Domínguez González (/ˈdʒeɪsən/; born February 7, 2003), nicknamed El Marciano or the Martian, is a Dominican professional baseball outfielder for the New York Yankees of Major League Baseball (MLB). He signed with the Yankees in 2019, and made his MLB debut in 2023.

== Early life ==
Domínguez was born in Esperanza, a municipality of the Valverde Province in the Dominican Republic on February 7, 2003. He is the second of six children born to Félix Domínguez and Dorca González. Félix is a former baseball player and a fan of the New York Yankees of Major League Baseball (MLB). Félix named his son after Yankees first baseman Jason Giambi.

Domínguez began to train for a career in baseball at the age of eight. He signed with trainer Iván Noboa at age 13. Domínguez played as a catcher before transitioning into a center fielder. He is considered to be a five-tool player. During his training, someone referred to him as "El Marciano", Spanish for "the Martian", because his talent was not of this world. Several workout videos that he posted on social media went viral, earning him comparisons to Mickey Mantle, Bo Jackson, and Mike Trout.

== Baseball career ==
=== Minor leagues ===
MLB.com ranked Domínguez as the top prospect eligible to sign with an MLB team in the 2019–2020 international class. He signed with the Yankees for a franchise record $5.1 million signing bonus on July 2, 2019, receiving the majority of the Yankees' $5.4 million total allotment for international signings for the year. He did not play in 2020 due to the cancellation of the minor league baseball season resulting from the COVID-19 pandemic, and instead trained at a baseball academy in Santiago.

Domínguez began the 2021 season in extended spring training. In June, he made his professional baseball debut with the Florida Complex League Yankees of the Rookie-level Florida Complex League. He was selected to represent the Yankees in the 2021 All-Star Futures Game. Domínguez became the first prospect to appear in the All-Star Futures Game without having played a full-season in the minor league. The Yankees promoted Domínguez to the Tampa Tarpons of the Low-A Southeast League after the Futures Game; he had batted 4-for-20 (.200) with six strikeouts and six walks in the Florida Complex League. Domínguez batted .258 with five home runs and 18 runs batted in (RBIs) in 49 games played.

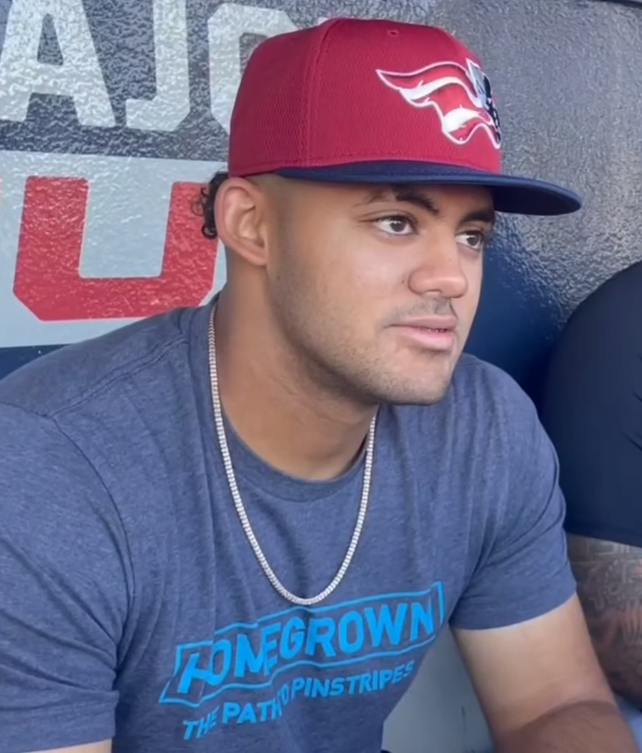
Domínguez with the Somerset Patriots in 2022

Domínguez began the 2022 season with Tampa. He appeared in the 2022 All-Star Futures Game, and was then promoted to the Hudson Valley Renegades of the High-A South Atlantic League. When Hudson Valley's season ended, the Yankees promoted Domínguez to the Somerset Patriots of the Double-A Eastern League for their last few regular season games and their postseason.

In 2023, the Yankees invited Domínguez to spring training as a non-roster player and assigned him to Somerset to begin the season. The Yankees promoted him to the Scranton/Wilkes-Barre RailRiders of the Triple–A International League on August 22. After the season, he won the Eastern League Top MLB Prospect Award.

=== New York Yankees ===
On September 1, 2023, the Yankees promoted Domínguez to the major leagues. He made his major league debut that day against the Houston Astros and hit a home run off the first swing in his first at bat against Justin Verlander. With that home run, Domínguez became the youngest player in team history to hit a home run in his major league debut and the fifth youngest player in MLB history to do so in their first plate appearance. He hit four home runs in eight games. On September 10, Domínguez was diagnosed with a torn ulnar collateral ligament, requiring Tommy John surgery. Prior to his injury, he batted 8-for-31 (.258) with four home runs in eight games.

Domínguez began the 2024 season on the 60-day injured list to continue recovery from elbow surgery. After a rehabilitation assignment began in May, the Yankees activated Domínguez from the injured list and optioned him to Scranton/Wilkes-Barre on June 12. However, on June 20, manager Aaron Boone announced that Domínguez would be out up to eight weeks after suffering a "pretty significant" oblique strain. He returned to Scranton/Wilkes-Barre on July 26. On August 18, the Yankees selected Domínguez as their 27th man for the Little League Classic; he batted 0-for-4 with three strikeouts and returned to the RailRiders after the game. On September 9, the Yankees promoted Domínguez to the major league roster. He batted .179 in 56 at bats and struggled defensively as a left fielder.

Domínguez (left) with the Yankees in 2025

On May 9, 2025, Domínguez became the youngest Yankee to hit three home runs in a game, playing against the Athletics at their temporary home field in Sacramento. Dominguez hit two home runs batting left-handed (including a grand slam) and one from the right side, recording 7 RBIs in a 3–4 night. This was just the third switch-hit, three home-run game, that included a grand slam in Major League history, (Note: Preceded by Eddie Murray on August 26, 1985, and by Bill Mueller on July 29, 2003.) On May 21, Dominguez hit his first major league walk-off home run, taking Texas Rangers pitcher Luke Jackson deep to claim a 4–3 victory. This was also the Yankees' first walk-off homer since 2022.

On March 20, 2026, the Yankees optioned Domínguez to Triple-A Scranton/Wilkes-Barre to start the regular season. On May 7, 2026, Domínguez suffered an apparent injury after crashing into the wall in left field, and was carted off the field. It was later revealed that he suffered an AC joint sprain in his left shoulder, which landed him on the injured list.

== See also ==
- All-Star Futures Game all-time roster
- List of Major League Baseball players with a home run in their first major league at bat
