= Sarah Jorge León =

- Born: 27 November 1982 (age 43); Santo Domingo

Sarah Amalia Jorge León (born 27 November 1982) is an actress, writer and producer from the Dominican Republic.

== Life and career ==
Jorge León was born in Santo Domingo, Dominican Republic. She is the oldest of three children, with siblings Marcos Jorge León and actress Nina Jorge León. Her parents are María Amalia León Cabral, arts patron, philanthropist, and director of the Eduardo León Jimenes Foundation – the elder of two daughters of businessman José León Asensio –, and civil engineer, Marcos Augusto Jorge Elías. She is great-greanddaughter of businessmen José María Cabral Bermúdez and Eduardo León Jimenes; she is also descended from Dominican presidents Buenaventura Báez, Ulises Espaillat, and Marco Antonio Cabral.

Miss Jorge León is a psychology graduate (concentration: drama / communications) (cum laude) from Manhattanville College and also holds a Master of Fine Arts (acting) from the ART / MXAT program at Harvard University; this program requires a six-month residency at the MXAT theater (Moscow, Russia), founded by Stanislavski.

Some of her roles include classics such as Suki from the play Celebration by Harold Pinter; Hermia in Midsummer Night's Dream by Shakespeare and Kleopatra in Diary of a Scoundrel by Ostrovsky. She participated as part of the cast of the Spanish Repertoire of New York, where she acted in classics such as: Rosita the Solterona and Bodas de Sangre directed by René Buch, as well as the role of “La Brasileña” in Pantaleón and its Visitors, among others.

Her film credits include starring roles in shorts such as 729 and In the Face of Madness, as well as in feature films such as Women, Lotoman, Lotoman 2.0, South of Innocence, Beast of Cardo, The Seven Deaths, etc.

Sarah starred in television roles such as Sofia in the mini-series The Don, Sara in the pilot Dumped, Karina in the pilot Slit NYC, Adriana for the American series Jane The Virgin (currently on the digital platform Netflix).

Miss Jorge León just wrapped a leading performance on the film Candela directed by Andrés Farías (which project was selected at the Fabrique Du Cinema Du Monde in Cannes 2018, as well as selected winner of the IBERMEDIA development fund 2016 and Sundance Screenwriters Lab 2016 and Sundance Editing Lab 2019), where she played the role of Sera Peñablanca.

Miss Jorge León co-starred in the international box office hit film After, led by Hero Fiennes Tiffin and Josephine Langford.

Jorge was nominated in 2015 for the La Silla Awards and the Soberano Award in the "Best Leading Actress" category, for her role in Al Sur de la Inocencia.

== Filmography ==
Year	Title	Character	Director	Country
2011	Lotoman	Camelita	Archie López	(Dominican Republic)
2012	Lotoman 2.0	Camelita	Archie López	(Dominican Republic)
2014	Al Sur de la Inocencia	Vera	Héctor Valdez	(Dominican Republic)
2014	Bestia de Cardo	Sara	Virginia Sánchez Navarro	(Dominican Republic)
2015	República del Color	Narrator (voice)	Héctor Valdez	(Dominican Republic)
2016	Death by Designer	Marlena Van Zane	Frankie Báez	(United States)
2016	Remember Him	Jasiel	Frankie Báez	(United States)
2017	Jane the Virgin	Adrianna	Gina Lamar	(United States)
2017	Las Siete Muertes	Eva	Gerardo Herrero	(Spain)
2019	After	Prof. Martínez	Jenny Gage	(United States)
2021	Candela	Sera Peñablanca	Andrés Farías	(Dominican Republic) (France)
2026	Melodrama	Miriam	Andrés Farías	(Dominican Republic)

== Ancestry ==
Ancestors of Sarah Jorge León

16. Juan Pedro Jorge Peña; Paradero, Dominican Republic
8. Brig. Gen. Francisco Antonio Jorge Domínguez (1878–1942); Altamira, Dominican Republic
17. Dolores Domínguez; Gurabo, Dominican Republic
4. Lt. Gen. Marcos Antonio Jorge Moreno (1927–2005); Santiago de los Caballeros, Dominican Republic
18. Marcos Antonio Moreno López; Spain
9. María Concepción Moreno Domínguez (1883–1967); Gurabo, Dominican Republic
19. María Concepción Domínguez Gómez; Jánico, Dominican Republic
2. Marcos Augusto Jorge Elías (1948–2018); Santiago de los Caballeros, Dominican Republic
10. José Elías; Lebanon
5. Adelina Elías Yunes; Santiago de los Caballeros, Dominican Republic
11. Sarah Yunes; Lebanon
1. Sarah Amelia Jorge León (born 1992); Santo Domingo, Dominican Republic
24. Antonio Gavino de León González (1848–1913)
12. Eduardo Antonio León Jimenes (1885–1937)
25. María Natividad Jiménez López
6. José Augusto César León Asensio (1934–); Santiago de los Caballeros, Dominican Republic
26. Ramón Asensio Ruiz (1863–1946)
13. María Asensio Córdoba (1896–1976)
27. Rosa Adelaida Córdoba Viscarrondo (1870–1905)
3. Dr. María Amalia León Cabral (b. 1960)
28. José María Cabral y Báez (1864–1937); Baní, Dominican Republic
14. José María Cabral Bermúdez (1902–1984); Santiago de los Caballeros, Dominican Republic
29. María Petronila Bermúdez Rochette (1872–1942); Santiago de los Caballeros, Dominican Republic
7. Petrica Cabral Vega (1938–); Santiago de los Caballeros, Dominican Republic
30. José Nicolás Vega Llenas (1867–1925); Santiago de los Caballeros, Dominican Republic
15. Mercedes Amalia Vega Batlle; Santiago de los Caballeros, Dominican Republic
31. María Asunción Batlle Espaillat (1876–1972); Santiago de los Caballeros, Dominican Republic
