= Paradero =

- Town
- Interactive map of Paradero
- Coordinates: 19°34′0″N 70°12′0″W
- country: Dominican Republic
- province: Valverde

Population (2007)
  - Total: 2,022
- Time zone: UTC-4
- Area code: 1-809 1-829 1-849

Paradero is a small town in the Valverde of the Dominican Republic in the northwest of the country. It lies some 102 mi (or 163 km) north-west of Santo Domingo, the country's capital.

== See also ==
- Valverde Province
- Cibao region
- List of municipalities of the Dominican Republic
- Mao, Dominican Republic
- Jicomé
