= Candela (film) =

- Theatrical release poster
- Directed by: Andrés Farías
- Written by: Laura Conyedo; Andrés Farías
- Produced by: Pablo Lozano
- Starring: Judith Rodríguez Pérez; Sarah Jorge León; Gerardo Mercedes
- Cinematography: Saurabh Monga
- Edited by: Juanjo Cid
- Music by: Jorge Aragón; Ezel Feliz
- Production companies: Monte y Culebra; Vertical Production
- Release dates: September 16, 2021 (Fine Arts); October 14, 2021 (Dominican Republic)
- Running time: 93 minutes
- Countries: Dominican Republic; France
- Language: Spanish
- Box office: RD$186,950

Candela is a 2021 thriller drama film directed by Andrés Farías (in his directorial debut) from a screenplay he co-wrote with Laura Conyedo, based on the novel of the same name by Rey Andújar.

== Synopsis ==
The lives of a promiscuous high-society girl, a corrupt policeman trying to repair his relationship with his daughter, and a drag queen seeking justice intertwine after the death of poet and drug dealer Renato Castrate, meanwhile a hurricane approaches Santo Domingo.

== Cast ==
The actors participating in this film are:

- Judith Rodríguez Pérez as Yajaira
- Sarah Jorge León as Sera
- Gerardo Mercedes as Don Polín
- Ruth Emeterio as Morena
- Marcos Sánchez as Party guest
- Pepe Sierra as Forensic
- Cindy Galán as Hueso e tigre
- Katherine Montes as Receptionist
- Omar Patín as Captain
- Félix Germán as Pérez
- Mario Cersósimo as Lunch guest
- Cesar Domínguez as Lubrini
- José Cruz as Cobrador
- Danny Vásquez Castillo as Police officer

== Release ==
Candela had its world premiere on September 16, 2021, at the 11th Fine Arts International Film Festival, then screened on September 22, 2021, at the 16th Trinidad and Tobago Film Festival, on September 28, 2021, at the 30th Biarritz Film Festival, and on March 26, 2022, at the 38th Reflets du Cinéma Ibérique et Latino-américain.

The film was commercially released on October 14, 2021, in Dominican theaters.

== Accolades ==
Award / Festival	Date of ceremony	Category	Recipient(s)	Result	Ref.
Fine Arts International Film Festival	22 September 2021	Best Film	Candela	Won	
Fine Arts International Film Festival	22 September 2021	Best Director	Andrés Farías	Won	
Fine Arts International Film Festival	22 September 2021	Best Supporting Actor	Félix Germán	Won	
Biarritz Film Festival	3 October 2021	Jury Prize	Candela	Won	
ADOPRESCI Awards	5 May 2022	Best Film	Candela	Won	
ADOPRESCI Awards	5 May 2022	Best Director	Andrés Farías	Nominated	
ADOPRESCI Awards	5 May 2022	Best Actress	Sarah Jorge León	Won	
ADOPRESCI Awards	5 May 2022	Best Actor	Félix Germán	Nominated	
ADOPRESCI Awards	5 May 2022	Best Screenplay	Laura Conyedo & Andrés Farías	Nominated	
ADOPRESCI Awards	5 May 2022	Best Cinematography	Saurabb Monga	Nominated	
ADOPRESCI Awards	5 May 2022	Best Musicalization	Jorge Aragón & Ezel Feliz	Nominated	
ADOPRESCI Awards	5 May 2022	Best Editing	Juanjo Cid	Won	
ADOPRESCI Awards	5 May 2022	Best Sound	Marco Salaverría	Won	
La Silla Awards	28 August 2022	Best Picture	Candela	Won	
La Silla Awards	28 August 2022	Best Director	Andrés Farías	Nominated	
La Silla Awards	28 August 2022	Best Actress	Sarah Jorge León	Nominated	
La Silla Awards	28 August 2022	Best Supporting Actress	Yamile Schecker	Nominated	
La Silla Awards	28 August 2022	Best Supporting Actor	Félix German	Nominated	
La Silla Awards	28 August 2022	Best Producer	Pablo Lozano	Nominated	
La Silla Awards	28 August 2022	Best Screenplay	Laura Conyedo & Andrés Farías	Won	
La Silla Awards	28 August 2022	Best Cinematography	Saurabb Monga	Nominated	
La Silla Awards	28 August 2022	Best Musicalization	Jorge Aragon, Etzel Feliz & Pablo Lozano	Won	
La Silla Awards	28 August 2022	Best Editing	Juanjo Cid	Nominated	
La Silla Awards	28 August 2022	Best Production Design	Giselle Madera	Won	
La Silla Awards	28 August 2022	Best Art Direction	Giselle Madera	Nominated	
La Silla Awards	28 August 2022	Best Makeup	Ana M. Andrickson	Nominated	
La Silla Awards	28 August 2022	Best Sound Design	Marcos Salaverria	Won	
Soberano Awards	22 March 2023	Best Film - Drama	Candela	Nominated	
Soberano Awards	22 March 2023	Best Director	Andrés Farías	Nominated	
Soberano Awards	22 March 2023	Best Film Actress	Sarah Jorge León	Nominated	
Soberano Awards	22 March 2023	Best Film Actor	Félix Germán	Nominated	
