= Ranked list of Dominican provinces =

These are ranked lists of the Provinces of Dominican Republic. Population figures areas are taken from the report on the 2010 census.

The percentages (%) mean how much of the country the province has (population and area).

== By population ==
Rank	Province	Population	%	Area	%	Density	Map
1	Santo Domingo	2,374,370	25.1	1,302.2	2.7	1,823.35	30
2	Distrito Nacional	965,040	10.2	91.6	0.2	10,535.37	D.N.
3	Santiago	963,422	10.2	2,806.3	5.8	343.31	28
4	San Cristóbal	569,930	6.0	1,240.6	2.6	459.40	24
5	La Vega	394,205	4.2	2,292.5	4.7	171.95	13
6	Puerto Plata	321,597	3.4	1,805.6	3.7	178.11	20
7	San Pedro de Macorís	290,458	3.1	1,254.3	2.6	231.57	27
8	Duarte	289,574	3.1	1,649.5	3.4	175.55	5
9	La Altagracia	273,210	2.9	2,998.4	6.2	91.12	11
10	La Romana	245,433	2.6	652.1	1.3	376.37	12
11	San Juan	232,333	2.5	3,363.8	7.0	69.07	26
12	Espaillat	231,938	2.5	843.0	1.7	275.13	8
13	Azua	214,311	2.3	2,682.5	5.6	79.89	1
14	Barahona	187,105	2.0	1,660.2	3.4	112.70	3
15	Monte Plata	185,956	2.0	2,601.6	5.4	71.48	17
16	Peravia	184,344	2.0	785.2	1.6	234.77	19
17	Monseñor Nouel	165,224	1.7	992.0	2.1	166.56	15
18	Valverde	163,030	1.7	823.0	1.7	198.09	31
19	Sánchez Ramírez	151,392	1.6	1,185.8	2.5	127.67	23
20	María Trinidad Sánchez	140,925	1.5	1,206.5	2.5	116.80	14
21	Monte Cristi	109,607	1.2	1,885.8	3.9	58.12	16
22	Samaná	101,494	1.1	862.8	1.8	117.63	22
23	Baoruco	97,313	1.0	1,284.9	2.7	75.74	2
24	Hermanas Mirabal	92,193	1.0	427.4	0.9	215.71	21
25	El Seibo	87,680	0.9	1,788.4	3.7	49.03	7
26	Hato Mayor	85,017	0.9	1,319.3	2.7	64.44	9
27	Dajabón	63,955	0.7	1,021.3	2.1	62.62	4
28	Elías Piña	63,029	0.7	1,395.5	2.9	45.17	6
29	San José de Ocoa	59,544	0.6	853.4	1.8	69.77	25
30	Santiago Rodríguez	57,476	0.6	1,147.5	2.4	50.09	29
31	Independencia	52,589	0.6	2,007.4	4.2	26.20	10
32	Pedernales	31,587	0.3	2,080.5	4.3	15.18	18

== By area ==
Rank	Province	Population	%	Area	%	Density	Map
1	San Juan	232,333	2.5	3,363.8	7.0	69.07	26
2	La Altagracia	273,210	2.9	2,998.4	6.2	91.12	11
3	Santiago	963,422	10.2	2,806.3	5.8	343.31	28
4	Azua	214,311	2.3	2,682.5	5.6	79.89	1
5	Monte Plata	185,956	2.0	2,601.6	5.4	71.48	17
6	La Vega	394,205	4.2	2,292.5	4.7	171.95	13
7	Pedernales	31,587	0.3	2,080.5	4.3	15.18	18
8	Independencia	52,589	0.6	2,007.4	4.2	26.20	10
9	Monte Cristi	109,607	1.2	1,885.8	3.9	58.12	16
10	Puerto Plata	321,597	3.4	1,805.6	3.7	178.11	20
11	El Seibo	87,680	0.9	1,788.4	3.7	49.03	7
12	Barahona	187,105	2.0	1,660.2	3.4	112.70	3
13	Duarte	289,574	3.1	1,649.5	3.4	175.55	5
14	Elías Piña	63,029	0.7	1,395.5	2.9	45.17	6
15	Hato Mayor	85,017	0.9	1,319.3	2.7	64.44	9
16	Santo Domingo	2,374,370	25.1	1,302.2	2.7	1,823.35	30
17	Baoruco	97,313	1.0	1,284.9	2.7	75.74	2
18	San Pedro de Macorís	290,458	3.1	1,254.3	2.6	231.57	27
19	San Cristóbal	569,930	6.0	1,240.6	2.6	459.40	24
20	María Trinidad Sánchez	140,925	1.5	1,206.5	2.5	116.80	14
21	Sánchez Ramírez	151,392	1.6	1,185.8	2.5	127.67	23
22	Santiago Rodríguez	57,476	0.6	1,147.5	2.4	50.09	29
23	Dajabón	63,955	0.7	1,021.3	2.1	62.62	4
24	Monseñor Nouel	165,224	1.7	992.0	2.1	166.56	15
25	Samaná	101,494	1.1	862.8	1.8	117.63	22
26	San José de Ocoa	59,544	0.6	853.4	1.8	69.77	25
27	Espaillat	231,938	2.5	843.0	1.7	275.13	8
28	Valverde	163,030	1.7	823.0	1.7	198.09	31
29	Peravia	184,344	2.0	785.2	1.6	234.77	19
30	La Romana	245,433	2.6	652.1	1.3	376.37	12
31	Hermanas Mirabal	92,193	1.0	427.4	0.9	215.71	21
32	Distrito Nacional	965,040	10.2	91.6	0.2	10,535.37	D.N.

== By population density ==
Rank	Province	Population	%	Area	%	Density	Map
1	Distrito Nacional	965,040	10.2	91.6	0.2	10,535.37	D.N.
2	Santo Domingo	2,374,370	25.1	1,302.2	2.7	1,823.35	30
3	San Cristóbal	569,930	6.0	1,240.6	2.6	459.40	24
4	La Romana	245,433	2.6	652.1	1.3	376.37	12
5	Santiago	963,422	10.2	2,806.3	5.8	343.31	28
6	Espaillat	231,938	2.5	843.0	1.7	275.13	8
7	Peravia	184,344	2.0	785.2	1.6	234.77	19
8	San Pedro de Macorís	290,458	3.1	1,254.3	2.6	231.57	27
9	Hermanas Mirabal	92,193	1.0	427.4	0.9	215.71	21
10	Valverde	163,030	1.7	823.0	1.7	198.09	31
11	Puerto Plata	321,597	3.4	1,805.6	3.7	178.11	20
12	Duarte	289,574	3.1	1,649.5	3.4	175.55	5
13	La Vega	394,205	4.2	2,292.5	4.7	171.95	13
14	Monseñor Nouel	165,224	1.7	992.0	2.1	166.56	15
15	Sánchez Ramírez	151,392	1.6	1,185.8	2.5	127.67	23
16	Samaná	101,494	1.1	862.8	1.8	117.63	22
17	María Trinidad Sánchez	140,925	1.5	1,206.5	2.5	116.80	14
18	Barahona	187,105	2.0	1,660.2	3.4	112.70	3
19	La Altagracia	273,210	2.9	2,998.4	6.2	91.12	11
20	Azua	214,311	2.3	2,682.5	5.6	79.89	1
21	Baoruco	97,313	1.0	1,284.9	2.7	75.74	2
22	Monte Plata	185,956	2.0	2,601.6	5.4	71.48	17
23	San José de Ocoa	59,544	0.6	853.4	1.8	69.77	25
24	San Juan	232,333	2.5	3,363.8	7.0	69.07	26
25	Hato Mayor	85,017	0.9	1,319.3	2.7	64.44	9
26	Dajabón	63,955	0.7	1,021.3	2.1	62.62	4
27	Monte Cristi	109,607	1.2	1,885.8	3.9	58.12	16
28	Santiago Rodríguez	57,476	0.6	1,147.5	2.4	50.09	29
29	El Seibo	87,680	0.9	1,788.4	3.7	49.03	7
30	Elías Piña	63,029	0.7	1,395.5	2.9	45.17	6
31	Independencia	52,589	0.6	2,007.4	4.2	26.20	10
32	Pedernales	31,587	0.3	2,080.5	4.3	15.18	18

== Map ==
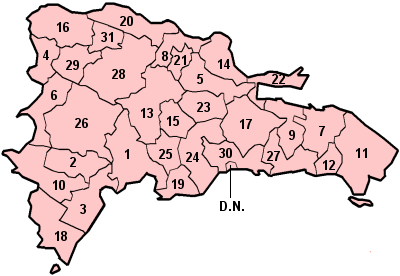
