= Melodrama (film) =

2026 Dominican Republic film

- Theatrical release poster
- Directed by: Andrés Farías
- Screenplay by: Rey Andújar; Andrés Farías; Julia Scrive-Loyer
- Produced by: Rafael Elías Muñoz
- Starring: Mercedes Morales; Jimmy Jean-Louis; Sarah Jorge León; Cyndie Lundy; Adriana Zayas
- Cinematography: Saurabh Monga
- Edited by: Pablo Chea
- Production company: Lantica Studios
- Release dates: 17 April 2026 (Miami Film Festival); 2 July 2026 (Dominican Republic)
- Running time: 90 minutes
- Country: Dominican Republic
- Languages: Spanish; French; Haitian

Melodrama is a 2026 Dominican romantic drama film co-written and directed by Andrés Farías. The film follows Sonia, a widow forced to shrink her life after her husband’s death. It had its premiere at the Miami Film Festival on 17 April 2026.

It was selected as the Dominican entry for the Best International Feature Film at the 99th Academy Awards.

== Synopsis ==
Sonia, a Dominican, gives up the home she lived in all her life and move into a tiny apartment by the Caribbean Sea after death of his husband. The change is too much for her at first, but everything shifts when she meets Aimé, a Haitian construction worker next door. They quickly grow close and start a romance that people around them strongly disapprove of. Now, with a chance to begin again, Sonia must choose whether to follow her feelings or give in to what society expects.

== Cast ==
- Mercedes Morales as Sonia
- Jimmy Jean-Louis as Aimé
- Sarah Jorge León as Miriam
- Cyndie Lundy
- Adriana Zayas

== Release ==
Melodrama had its World premiere at the 47rd Havana Film Festival on December 2025.

Melodrama had its US premiere at the 43rd Miami Film Festival on 17 April 2026.

The film was also screened at the Festival de Cine Fine Arts in official selection on 29 May 2026.

It was released in Caribbean Cinemas, Dominician Republic on 2 July 2026.

The film closed the Dominican Film Festival in New York 2026 on 11 August 2026.

== Accolades ==
Award	Date of ceremony	Category	Recipient	Result	Ref.
Dominican Film Festival in New York	11 August 2026	Best Film	Melodrama	Won	
Dominican Film Festival in New York	11 August 2026	Best director	Andrés Farías	Won	
Dominican Film Festival in New York	11 August 2026	Best Actress	Mercedes Morales	Won	
Puerto Rico Film Festival	23 August 2026	Best International Feature Film	Andrés Farías	Won	

== See also ==
- List of submissions to the 99th Academy Awards for Best International Feature Film
- List of Dominican submissions for the Academy Award for Best International Feature Film
