= Guatapanal =

- Location within the Dominican Republic
- Coordinates: 19°31′12″N 70°55′12″W
- Country: Dominican Republic
- Province: Valverde Province

Population (2008)
  - Total: 1 706

Guatapanal is a town in the Valverde Province Provinces of the Dominican Republic of the Dominican Republic.

== Sources ==
- – World-Gazetteer.com
