= Giselle Tavera =

Dominican singer

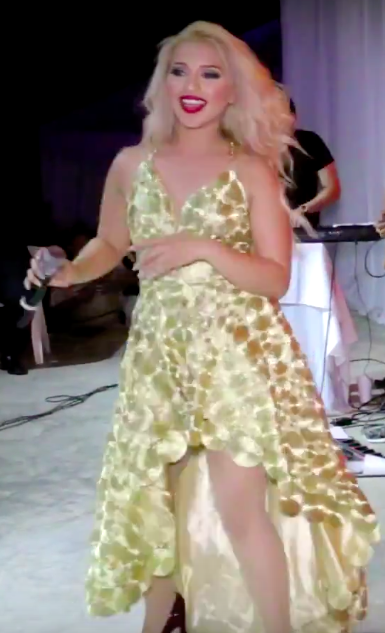
- Tavera in November 2014

Background information
- Born: Giselle Tavera Madera; July 14, 1993 (age 33); Esperanza, Dominican Republic
- Origin: Cherry Hill, New Jersey, U.S.
- Genres: Latin pop; bachata
- Occupation: Singer
- Instrument: Vocals
- Years active: 2010–present
- Label: LGT Latin Music LLC
- Website: giselletavera.com

Giselle Tavera Madera (born July 14, 1993) is a Dominican singer.

== Early life ==
Tavera was born in Esperanza, Dominican Republic, and later immigrated to Cherry Hill, New Jersey, at the age of seven. Tavera states that she grew up surrounded by Dominican and Mexican cultures.

== Career ==
Tavera sings in both English and Spanish. Five of her songs were ranked on Billboard's Tropical Airplay chart. Examples of her songs include a bachata version of "All I Want for Christmas Is You and a cover of Cyndi Lauper's "Time After Time". Her album Somos Más which has bilingual songs.

In 2013, Tavera sang "The Star-Spangled Banner" for a Philadelphia Eagles game. In preparation for an album, Tavera recorded songs with Tito Nieves and Luis Vargas. At the 2017 Golden Latin Awards in Pennsylvania, Tavera performed a collection of bachata songs dedicated to Puerto Rican singer Sophy Hernández.

== Selected discography ==
Title	Year	Peak chart positions
Title	Year	US Tropical Songs
"El"	2014	32
"Dejame Volar"	2015	13
"Sola Vivire Mejor"	2015	14
"All I Want for Christmas Is You"	2015	32
"Lo Mejor Para Mi"	2016	18

== Awards and nominations ==
Year	Nominee / work	Award	Result
2015	Giselle Tavera	Tropical Female Artist (Premio Lo Nuestro 2015)	Nominated
2017	Giselle Tavera	Urban Batacha (Premio Latino Edición Urbana)	Won
