= Jaibón =

- Town
- Jaibón in the Dominican Republic
- Coordinates: 19°36′42.08″N 71°05′0″W
- Country: Dominican Republic
- Province: Valverde
- Elevation: 54 m (177 ft)

Population (2022)
  - Total: 7.654
- Time zone: UTC-4 (AST)
- Area code: 1-809 1-829 1-849

Jaibón is a municipal district of the municipality of Laguna Salada, located northwest in the Valverde Province of the Dominican Republic. It is a small town, dedicated to agriculture and livestock.
