= Hipólito Pichardo =

Dominican baseball player (born 1969)

- Pitcher
- Born: August 22, 1969 (age 57); Jicomé, Dominican Republic
- Batted: Right Threw: Right

MLB debut
- April 21, 1992, for the Kansas City Royals

Last MLB appearance
- May 7, 2002, for the Houston Astros

MLB statistics
- Win–loss record: 50–44
- Earned run average: 4.44
- Strikeouts: 394
- Stats at Baseball Reference

Teams
- Kansas City Royals (1992–1998); Boston Red Sox (2000–2001); Houston Astros (2002)

Hipólito Antonio Pichardo Balbina (born August 22, 1969) is a Dominican former right-handed pitcher in Major League Baseball who played for three teams between 1992 and 2002. He batted and threw right-handed.

Pichardo filled various pitching roles, as a starter or coming out from the bullpen as a closer or a middle reliever. He reached the majors in 1992 with the Kansas City Royals, spending seven consecutive years with them before moving to the Boston Red Sox (2000–01) and Houston Astros (2002). He enjoyed a fine rookie season, when he finished with a record of 9–6 and a 3.95 earned run average in 24 starts, including a one-hit shutout against the Boston Red Sox as Luis Rivera's double in the sixth inning was the only hit surrendered.

In 1993, Pichardo went 7–8 and posted career highs in strikeouts (74) and innings pitched (165). After that, he suffered arm problems and was demoted to the bullpen. In 1999 he underwent right elbow surgery and missed the entire season. He returned in 2000 with the Red Sox and went 6–3 with one start and one save in 38 appearances. His one save that season came on July 31, 2000 against the Mariners. After going 2–1 in 2001, he lasted only one-third of an inning with Houston in 2002, his last major league season.

In a 10-season career, Pichardo posted a 50–44 record with a 4.44 ERA and 20 saves in 350 games, including 68 starts.

== See also ==
- Players from Dominican Republic in MLB
