= La Caya =

- Town
- Location within the Dominican Republic
- Coordinates: 19°42′0″N 71°7′12″W
- Country: Dominican Republic
- Province: Valverde
- founded: 1900
- Elevation: 172 m (564 ft)

Population (2010)
  - Total: 1 458
- Time zone: UTC-4

La Caya is a town in the Valverde province of the Cibao region of the Dominican Republic. The term "la caya" refers to a species of tree (Sideroxylon foetidissimum) which grows in the region.

== History ==
La Caya was founded in 1900. From its founding until 1939 it belonged to the Commons of Guayubin in the Montecristi province. The Law No. 125 of 1939 brought La Caya into the category of a section. With the Law No. 5220 of 1959, it belonged to the municipal district of Laguna Salada, municipality of Esperanza, Valverde province. It became a municipal district within the municipality of Laguna Salada with the passing of Law No. 151-01.

The town has an urban center and three smaller rural sections- Pozo Prieto, Loma de Pozo Prieto, and Palo Amarillo.

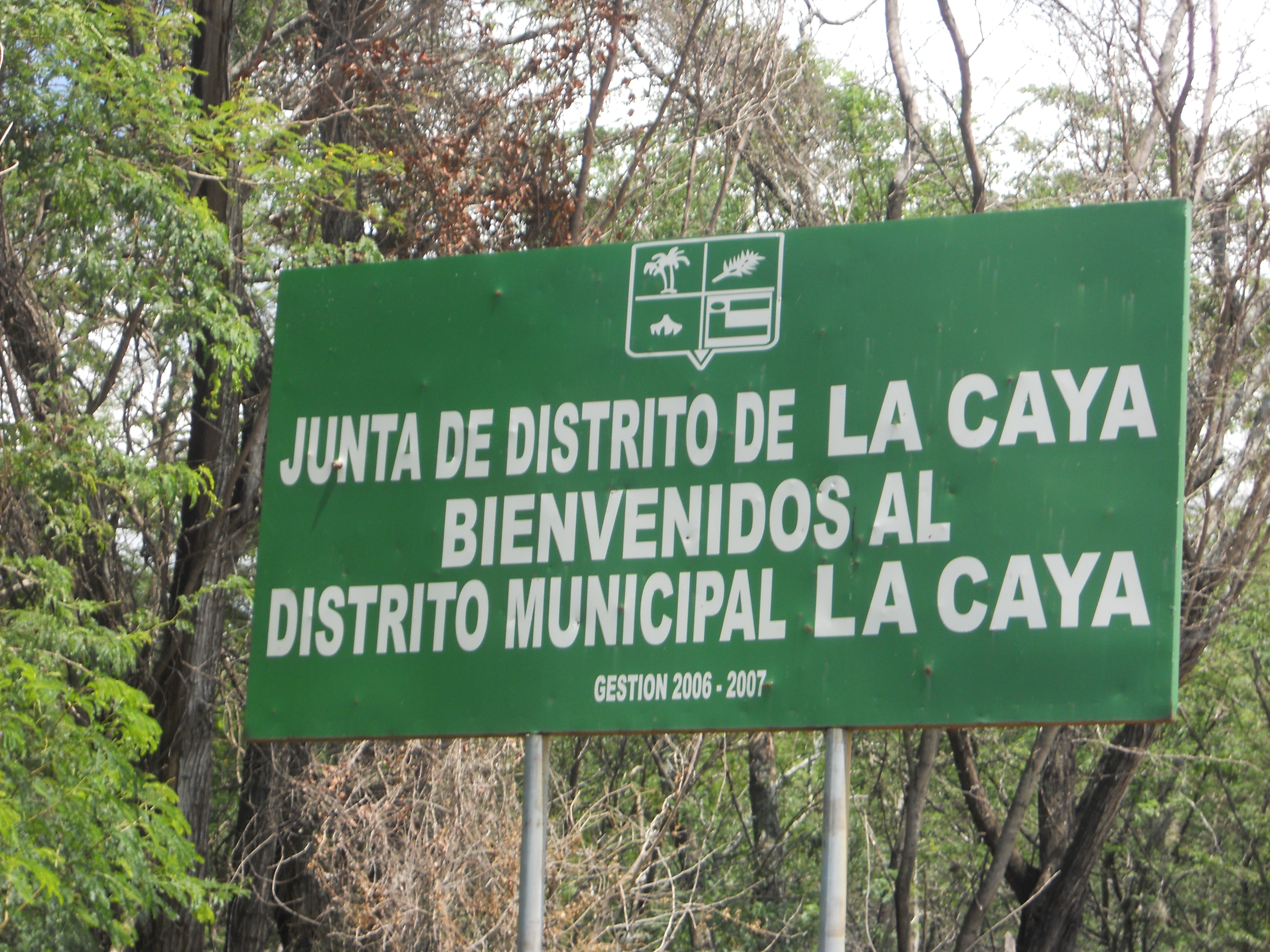
Sign in the entrance to La Caya

== Sources ==
- – World-Gazetteer.com
- Oficina Nacional de Estadística Tu municipio one.gob.do
