= Valverde Province =

Province of the Dominican Republic

Valverde
- Province
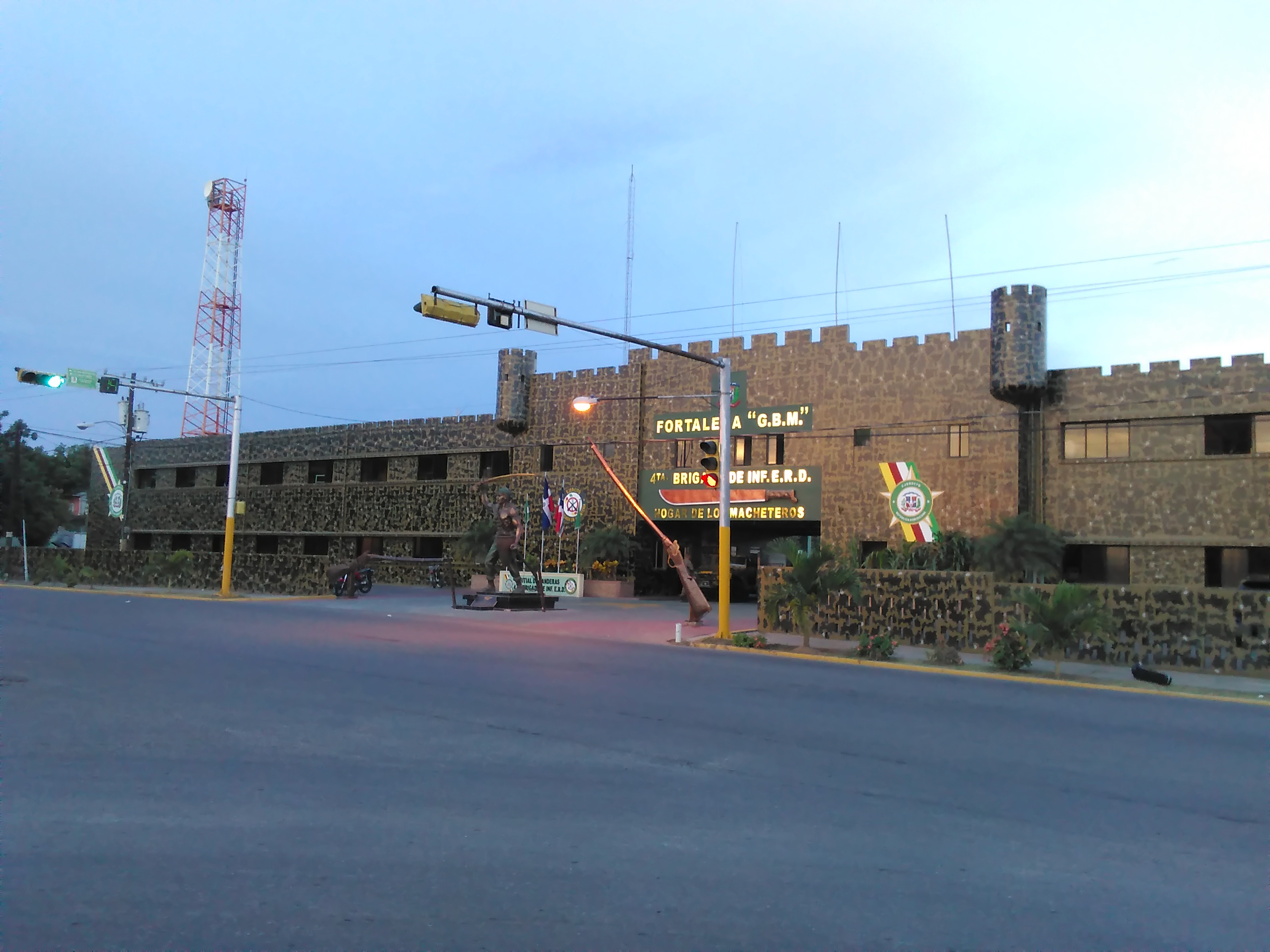
- Dominican Military base in Mao, Valverde

- Coat of arms

- Location of the Valverde Province
- Coordinates: 19°37′37″N 71°02′16″W
- Country: Dominican Republic
- Region: Cibao
- Province since: 1959
- Capital: Santa Cruz de Mao

Government
  - Type: Subdivisions
  - Body: 3 municipalities 10 municipal districts
  - Congresspersons: 1 Senator; 3 Deputies

Area
  - Total: 823.38 km^{2} (317.91 sq mi)

Population (2014)
  - Total: 217,026
  - Density: 263.58/km^{2} (682.67/sq mi)
- Time zone: UTC-4 (AST)
- Area code: 1-809 1-829 1-849
- ISO 3166-2: DO-27
- Postal Code: 61000

Valverde (Spanish pronunciation: [balˈβeɾðe]) is a province of the Dominican Republic. It was split from Santiago Province in 1959. It is in the northwestern part of the country. Its capital city is Santa Cruz de Mao.

It was created on 1959. It was a municipality of the Santiago province before being elevated to the category of province. Valverde was the birthplace of former President of the Republic from July 1857 to August 1858, General José Desiderio Valverde, for whom this province bears his name.

== History ==
The territory of the current Valverde province was one of the first non-coastal regions explored by Europeans because it was located to the south of La Isabela, the first city founded on the island. Close to it was the most accessible place to cross the Northern Cordillera, which was named by Christopher Columbus as the Port (or Pass) of Los Hidalgos. Columbus built a fort on the banks of the Yaque del Norte River.

Despite these early explorations the territory remained very sparsely inhabited during the colonial era, except for some isolated ranches where cattle roamed. The population, and number of herds, increased slightly during the 17th century with people who had been evicted from Monte Cristi and Bayajá (the "Osorio Devastations") and who preferred to remain in this area, close to their places of origin.

Its location halfway between the border with the French colony of Saint-Domingue (later, the Republic of Haiti) and the city of Santiago de los Caballeros meant that French and Haitian troops had to cross the territory of the current province, at least in its northern part, when they went to fight in Santiago. The soldiers of this land had the purpose of preventing enemy troops from crossing the northern part to attack and take the city of Santiago.

After the Dominican War of Independence and the War of Restoration some towns of some importance began to develop, especially Mao. In 1918, Luis L. Bogaert, a resident Belgian engineer, built the country's first irrigation canal, allowing him to irrigate his land and start growing rice. This was a major change in the region, and in time the province would become one of the country's leading rice producers.

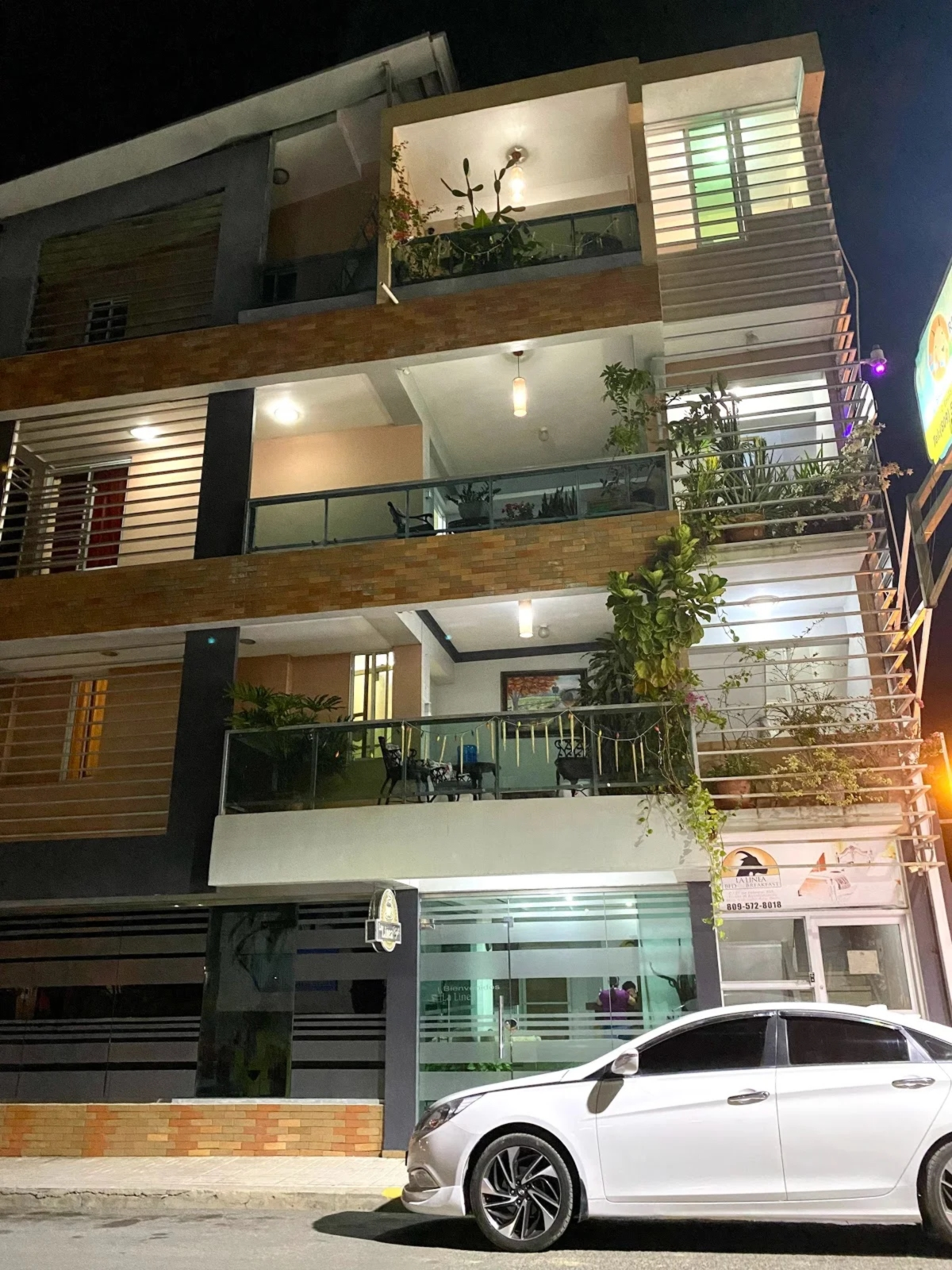
Hotel in Mao, Dominican Republic city.

When the Esperanza sugar mill was installed in the municipality of Esperanza at the end of the 1950s, many people immigrated to this municipality, significantly increasing the total population of the province. The province was officially created in 1958 with separate territory of the Santiago and Monte Cristi provinces (the territory that corresponds to Laguna Salada). It was integrated by the municipalities Valverde (now Mao) and Esperanza, and the Municipal District of Laguna Salada dependent on Esperanza. In 1967 the name of Mao was restored to the main municipality, conserving the name of Valverde for the province.

== Municipalities and municipal districts ==
The province as of June 20, 2006 was divided into the following municipalities (municipio) and municipal districts (distrito municipal - D.M.) and the municipal Seat (distrito cabecera - D.C.) within them:

- Santa Cruz de Mao, head municipality of the province
  - Ámina (D.M.)
  - Guatapanal (D.M.)
  - Pueblo Nuevo (D.M.)
- Esperanza
  - Boca de Mao (D.M.)
  - Jicomé (M.D.)
  - Maizal (M.D.)
  - Paradero (M.D.)
- Laguna Salada
  - Cruce de Guayacanes (D.M.)
  - Jaibon (D.M.)
  - La Caya (D.M.)

The following is a sortable table of the municipalities with population figures as of the 2012 census; the population figures for the municipal districts are included within their municipalities. Urban population are those living in the seats (cabeceras: literally, heads) of municipalities or of municipal districts. Rural population are those living in the districts (Secciones: literally, sections) and neighborhoods (Parajes: literally, places) outside of them.

Name	Total population	Urban population	Rural population
Esperanza	70,588	52,732	17,856
Laguna Salada	30,041	20,470	9,571
Santa Cruz de Mao	106,818	80,925	25,893
Valverde Province	207,447	154,127	53,320

For comparison with the municipalities and municipal districts of other provinces see the list of municipalities and municipal districts of the Dominican Republic.

== Name ==
The province was named Valverde after José Desiderio Valverde, an officer of the Dominican army when the Dominican-Haitian War. Later, he was President of the Dominican Republic for one year (July 1857 - August 1858). He was from Santiago de los Caballeros.

== Geography ==
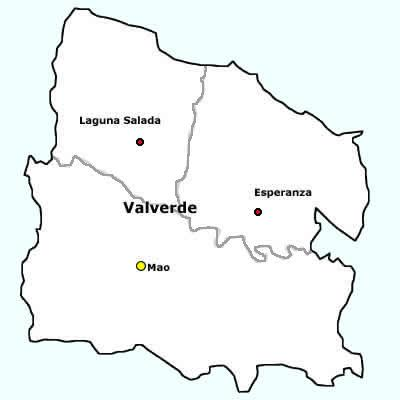
Municipalities of Valverde Province

The Valverde province has a total area of 822.9 km^{2} (317.7 sq mi). It has 1.7% of the area of the Dominican Republic and it is ranked as the 28th (out of 31 plus the National District) largest province.

South of the city of Mao are the Sierra Samba (a chain of low hills) and part of the Cordillera Central mountain range. The highest mountains of the island are in the Cordillera Central but in the Valverde province there are only low mountains.

There are several important rivers that flow through the territory of the province. The most important river is the Yaque del Norte, that flows from east to west; the other rivers are all tributaries of Yaque del Norte. Other important rivers are Mao and Ámina that come from the Cordillera Central.

== Location ==
The Valverde province is in the northwest part of the Cibao valley. It is bordered to the north by the Puerto Plata province, to the east and south by the Santiago province, to the southwest by the Santiago Rodríguez province and to the west by the Monte Cristi province.
