= Jicomé =

Distrito municipal de Jicomé
- Town
- jicome in the dominican republic
- Coordinates: 19°39′0″N 70°57′0″W
- Country: Dominican Republic
- Province: Valverde
- Elevation: 366 m (1,201 ft)

Population (2008)
  - Total: 20,777
- Time zone: UTC-4
- Area code: 1-809 1-829 1-849

Jicomé is a town and Municipal District in the Valverde province of the Dominican Republic. It is in the northwestern part of the country known as El Cibao

== Notable people ==
Hipólito Pichardo (born August 22, 1969) is a Dominican former right-handed pitcher in Major League Baseball who played for three teams between 1992 and 2002. He batted and threw right-handed.

== Sources ==
- – World-Gazetteer.com
