= Maizal =

- Location within the Dominican Republic
- Coordinates: 19°39′0″N 71°1′48″W
- Country: Dominican Republic
- Province: Valverde
- Elevation: 98 m (322 ft)

Population (2008)
  - Total: 9,486

Maizal is a town in the Valverde province of the Dominican Republic.

== Sources ==
- – World-Gazetteer.com
