= Mao, Dominican Republic =

Santa Cruz de Mao Mao
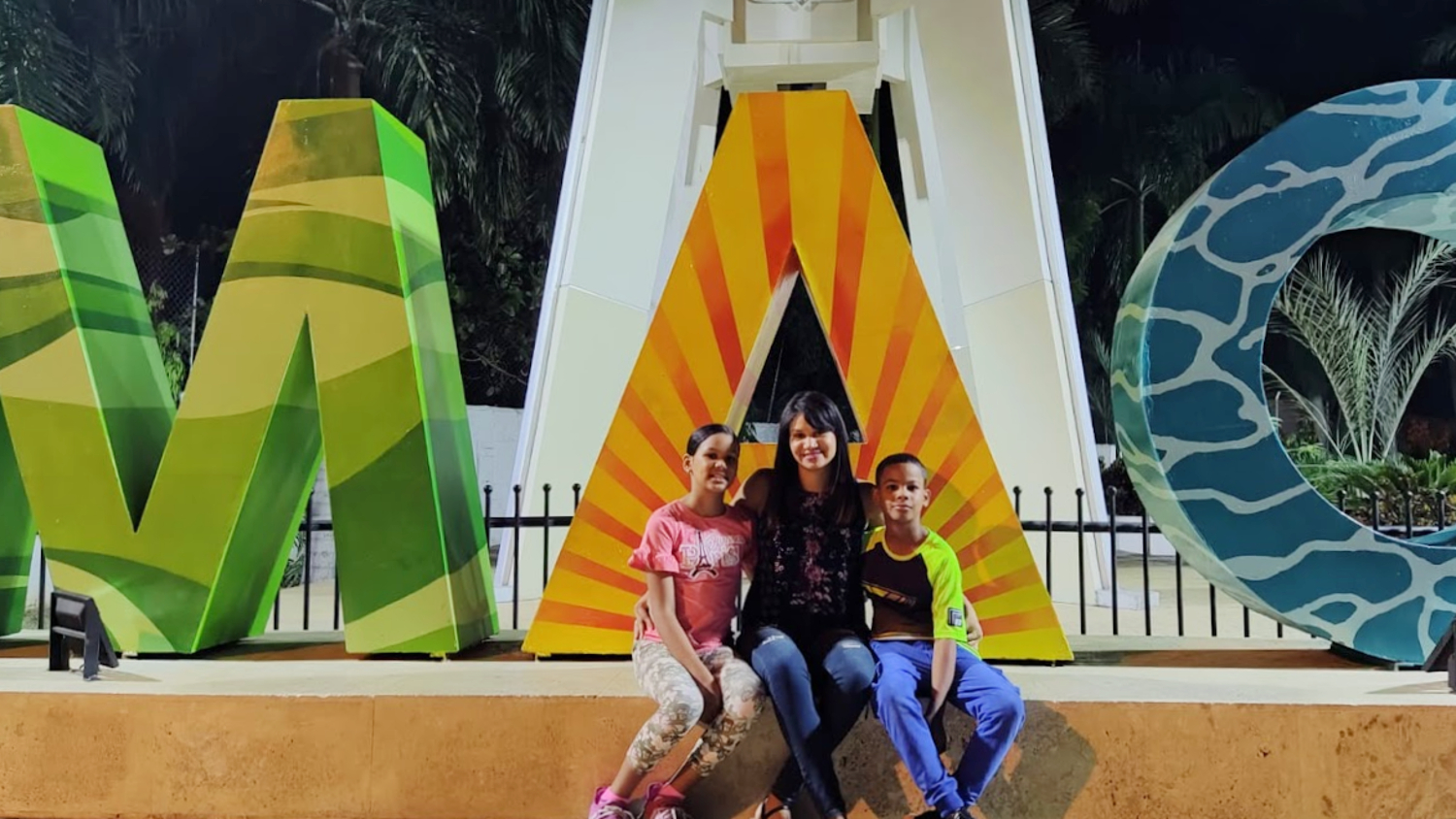
- Sign in Mao, Dominican Republic

- Coat of arms

- Mao in the Dominican Republic
- Coordinates: 19°34′0″N 71°05′0″W
- Country: Dominican Republic
- Province: Valverde
- Founded: 1875
- Municipality since: 1882

Area
  - Total: 423.60 km^{2} (163.55 sq mi)
- Elevation: 78 m (256 ft)

Population (2019)
  - Total: 207,818
  - Density: 490.60/km^{2} (1,270.6/sq mi)
  - Demonym: Maeño(a)
- Distance to – Santo Domingo: 210 km
- Municipal Districts: 3
- Climate: BSh

Santa Cruz de Mao, or simply Mao, is the head municipality of the Valverde province, in the Dominican Republic.

It is the largest city of the Dominican northwest and the centre of the region. Its name, a Taíno word, comes from the River Mao, near the city. Its nickname is Ciudad de los Bellos Atardeceres (lit. 'City of the Beautiful Sunsets'); this was given by Juan De Jesus Reyes, renowned poet and Dominican literary icon. There are no mountains to the west of the city and it is common to see a "red" sky at sunset; it is a very dry region and there is much dust in the air which gives the sky a red color.

== History ==
For most of its history, the region was called "El Despoblado"; that means a region without any population, because it is a very dry region and agriculture was not possible.

When the governor of the Spanish colony gave the order in 1606 that everybody living on the northern coast had to move inland, some people came to live around the present Mao. They had cattle that were raised in hatos. "Hato" means a large farm for raising cattle (a ranch), and so the names of many places around Mao derive from the word: Hatico, Hato del Yaque, Hato Nuevo, Hato Viejo, Hato del Medio.

The town of Mao was built close to where the River Mao flows into the River Yaque del Norte. The first Catholic church was built in 1869.

The town was made a Puesto Cantonal (an old category similar to the present Municipal District under a military government). Mao was elevated to the category of municipality in 1882, and in 1904 its official name was changed to "Valverde" after José Desiderio Valverde, former President of the Dominican Republic. Because the name Mao was known by everybody and Valverde was a new name, people called the city "Valverde (Mao)", and it is still common to say so.

When the province was created in 1959, Mao was made its head municipality and provincial capital.

== Santa Cruz de Mao city ==
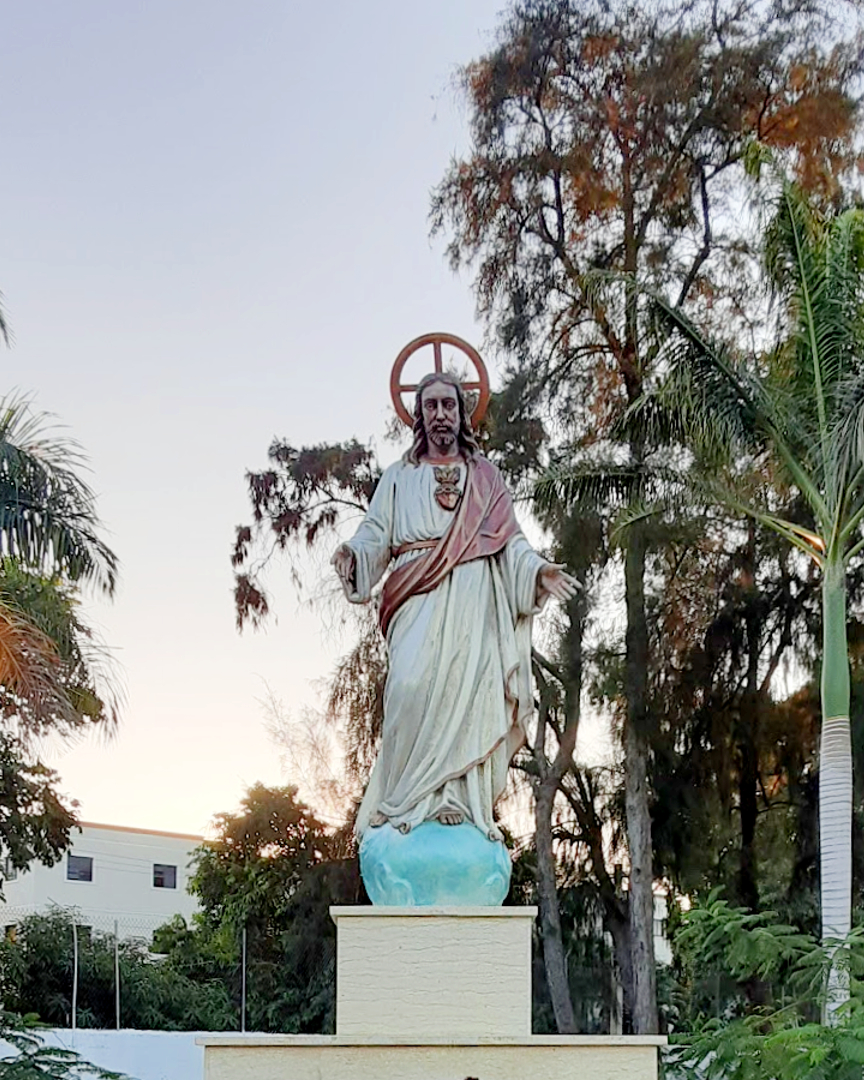

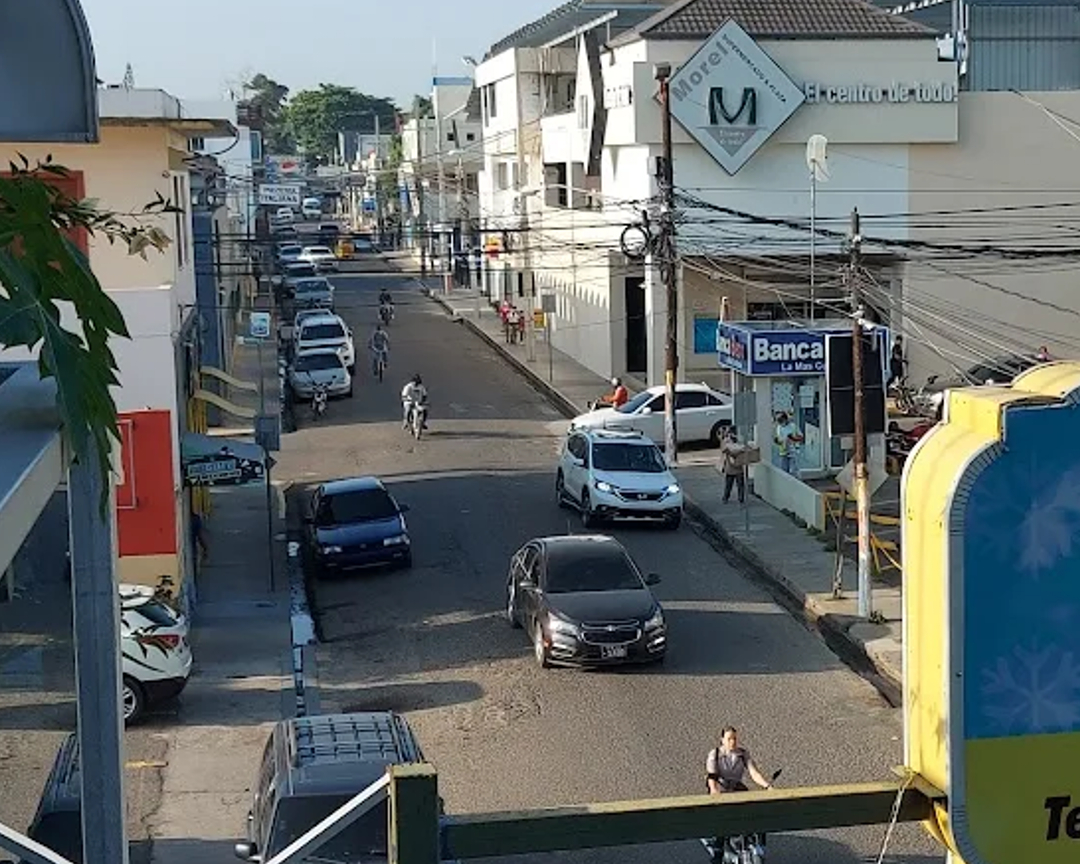

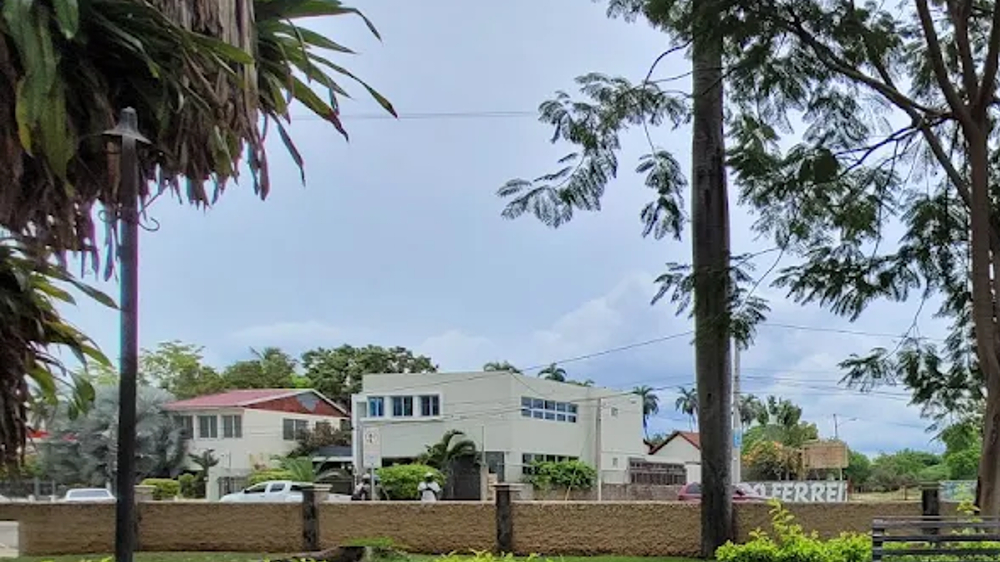

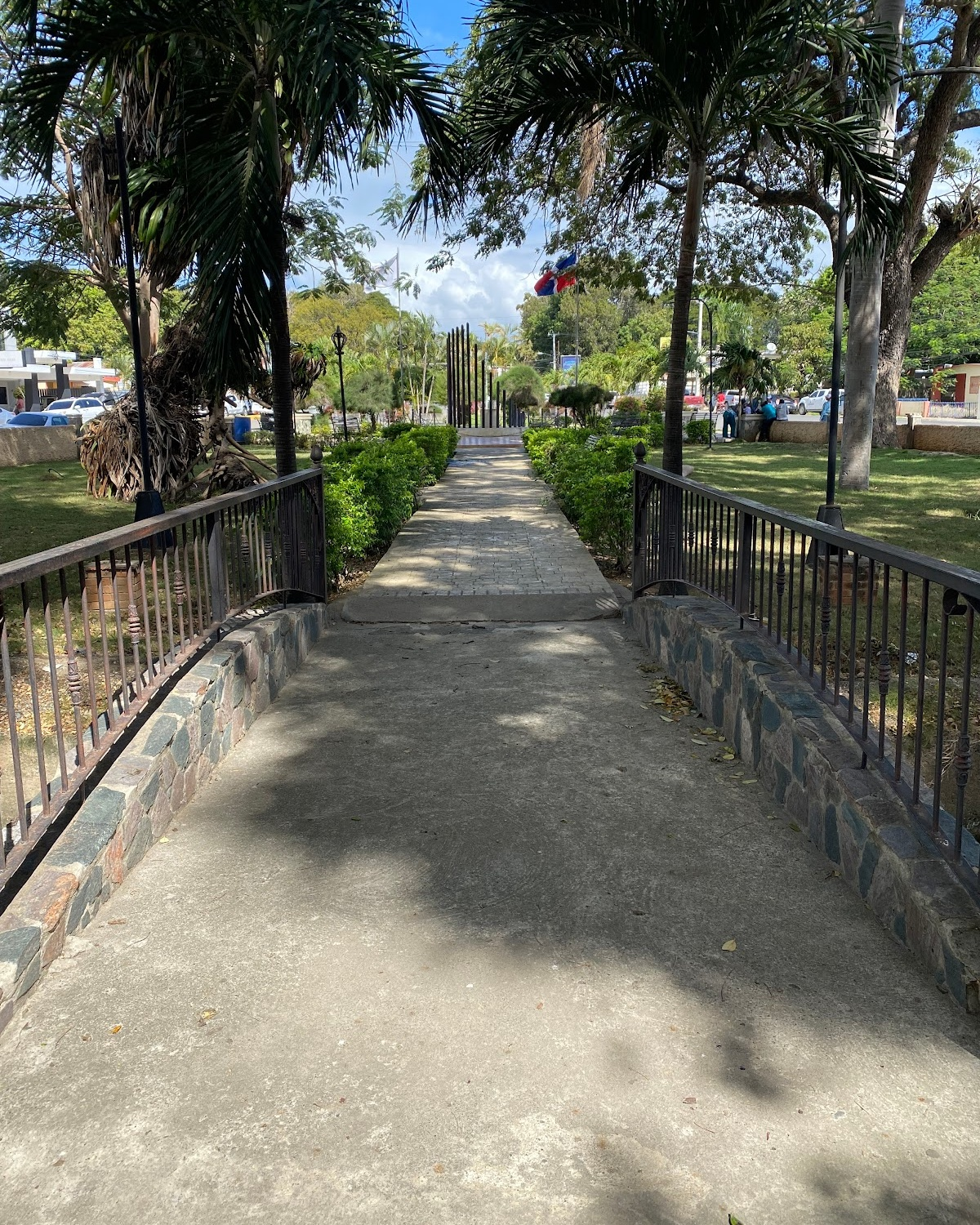

== Climate ==
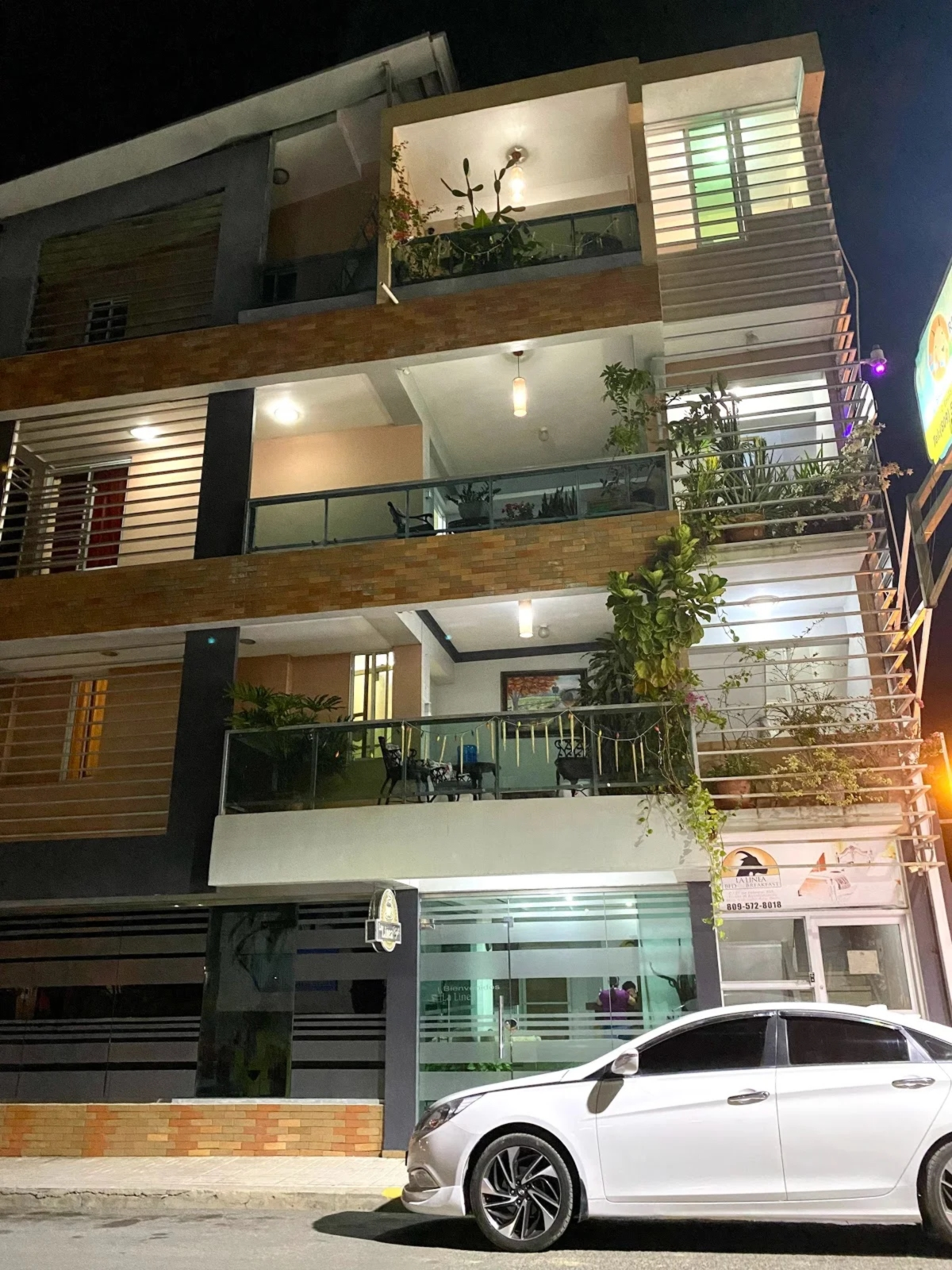
Hotel in Mao, Dominican Republic city

Unlike the humid northern coast of the Dominican Republic, Mao is located in a sheltered valley and like the southern coastal fringe of Hispaniola, has a hot semi-arid climate (Köppen BSh), with the temperature being warm year-round and some months being wetter than others. Mao receives 699.6 millimetres (27.54 in) of rainfall annually over 60.8 precipitation days. The driest month is January, which receives 21.3 millimetres (0.84 in) of rain on average, and the wettest month is May, which receives 119.1 millimetres (4.69 in) of rainfall on average. May also has the most precipitation days of any month (9.3) and July has the least (2.5). On 31 August 1954, Mao recorded a temperature of 43.0 °C (109.4 °F), which is the highest temperature to have ever been recorded in the Dominican Republic.

Climate data for Mao, Dominican Republic (1961-1990)
Month	Jan	Feb	Mar	Apr	May	Jun	Jul	Aug	Sep	Oct	Nov	Dec	Year
Record high °C (°F)	36.8 (98.2)	38.8 (101.8)	39.8 (103.6)	38.0 (100.4)	40.2 (104.4)	40.4 (104.7)	39.0 (102.2)	43.0 (109.4)	40.0 (104.0)	39.8 (103.6)	40.0 (104.0)	37.6 (99.7)	40.4 (104.7)
Mean daily maximum °C (°F)	30.2 (86.4)	30.9 (87.6)	32.1 (89.8)	33.0 (91.4)	33.7 (92.7)	34.7 (94.5)	35.1 (95.2)	35.5 (95.9)	35.2 (95.4)	34.1 (93.4)	31.7 (89.1)	30.1 (86.2)	33.0 (91.4)
Mean daily minimum °C (°F)	18.7 (65.7)	19.1 (66.4)	19.9 (67.8)	20.9 (69.6)	21.9 (71.4)	22.7 (72.9)	23.1 (73.6)	23.0 (73.4)	22.5 (72.5)	21.9 (71.4)	20.7 (69.3)	19.2 (66.6)	21.1 (70.0)
Record low °C (°F)	13.2 (55.8)	12.2 (54.0)	14.0 (57.2)	13.6 (56.5)	17.0 (62.6)	19.0 (66.2)	19.0 (66.2)	19.0 (66.2)	18.8 (65.8)	18.0 (64.4)	14.8 (58.6)	12.6 (54.7)	12.2 (54.0)
Average rainfall mm (inches)	21.6 (0.85)	34.4 (1.35)	38.5 (1.52)	71.4 (2.81)	119.1 (4.69)	72.0 (2.83)	27.3 (1.07)	42.9 (1.69)	75.3 (2.96)	81.9 (3.22)	74.9 (2.95)	40.3 (1.59)	699.6 (27.53)
Average rainy days (≥ 1.0 mm)	3.0	3.3	3.3	5.6	9.3	6.0	2.5	4.1	6.0	7.1	6.3	4.3	60.8
Source: NOAA

== Economy ==
The main economic activity of the province is agriculture; the main products in the municipality are rice, bananas and plantain.

== Notable people ==
- Monica Boyar (1920–2013), Dominican-born American singer
- Pedro Borbón (1946-2012), Dominican professional baseball pitcher
- Félix Fermín (born October 9, 1963) Dominican former professional baseball shortstop /Manager in LIDOM
- Omar Minaya (born November 10, 1958) Dominican-born (MLB) baseball executive
