= Miches =

- Location within the Dominican Republic
- Coordinates: 18°58′48″N 69°3′0″W
- Country: Dominican Republic
- Province: El Seibo

Area
  - Total: 443.8 km^{2} (171.4 sq mi)
- Elevation: 2 m (6.6 ft)

Population (2010)
  - Total: 20.813
  - Density: 47/km^{2} (120/sq mi)
- Distance to – Sabana de la Mar (Los Haitises National Park): 40 km
- Distance to – Santa Cruz de El Seibo: 44 km
- Distance to – Punta Cana / Bávaro: 95 km
- Municipalities: 2: El Cedro and La Gina

Miches is a town located in El Seibo province in the northeast coast of the Dominican Republic. The community sits between the northern slopes of the Cordillera Oriental and the southern shore of the Samaná Bay.

== Origin of name ==
In 1936, the community formerly known as El Jovero changed its name -through Act No. 1181, published in the Official Gazette No. 4956-, in honor of the Dominican General of French origin Eugenio Miches.

== Economic activity ==
Miches has traditionally been a rural community in one of the least densely populated regions of the Dominican Republic. Agriculture, particularly the cultivation of rice, coconut, cocoa and tubers like yautía and ñame, cattle ranching, artisanal fishing, local handicrafts and small businesses are the main economic engines of the area.

Due to its geographical location, with the sea to the north and a mountain range to the south, Miches has historically lived isolated. In recent years, improvements have been seen in the roads connecting Punta Cana, Santa Cruz de El Seibo and Sabana de la Mar, which have opened a new channel of communication that favors the diversification of the economy and an incipient development of tourism.

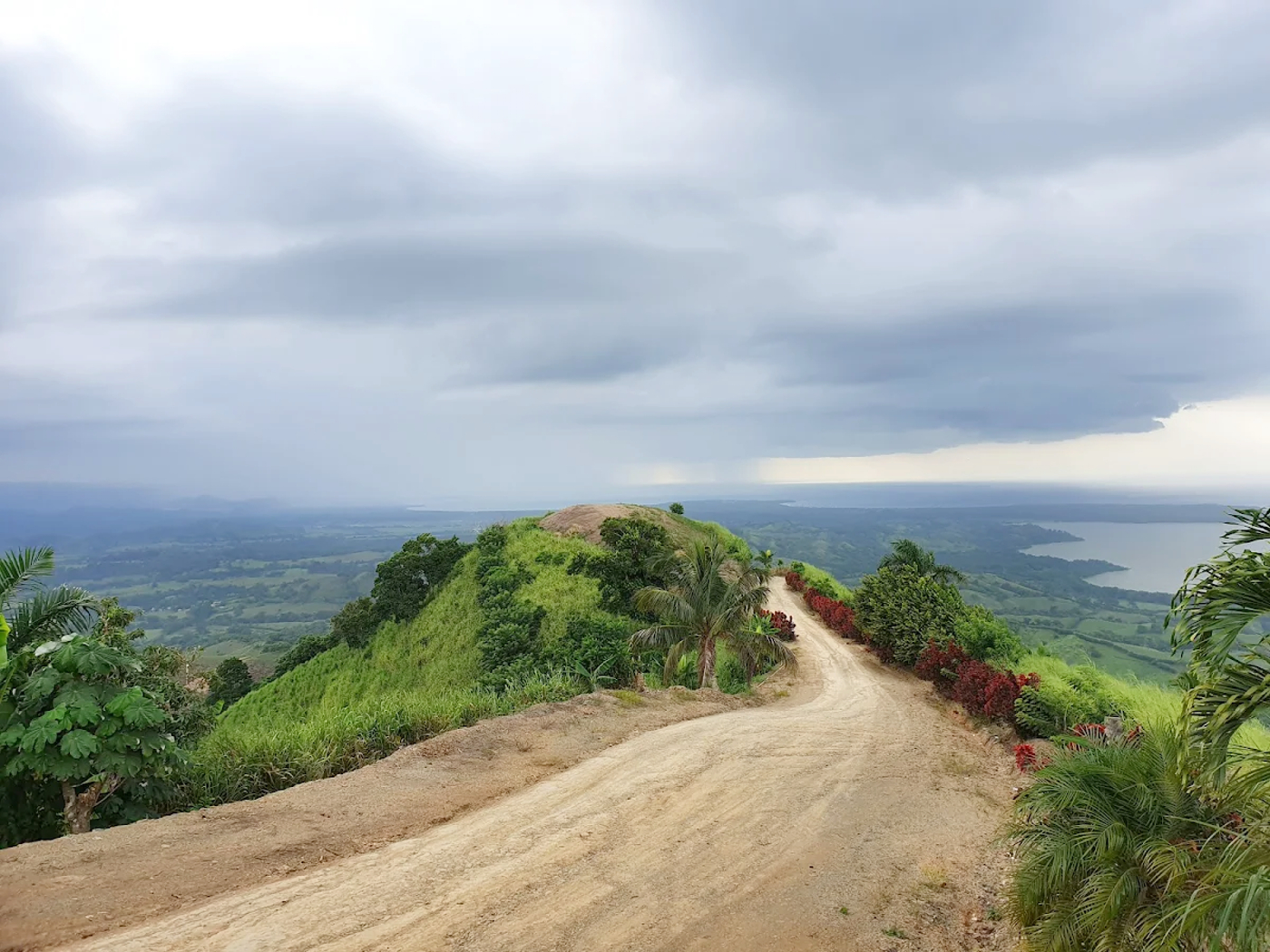

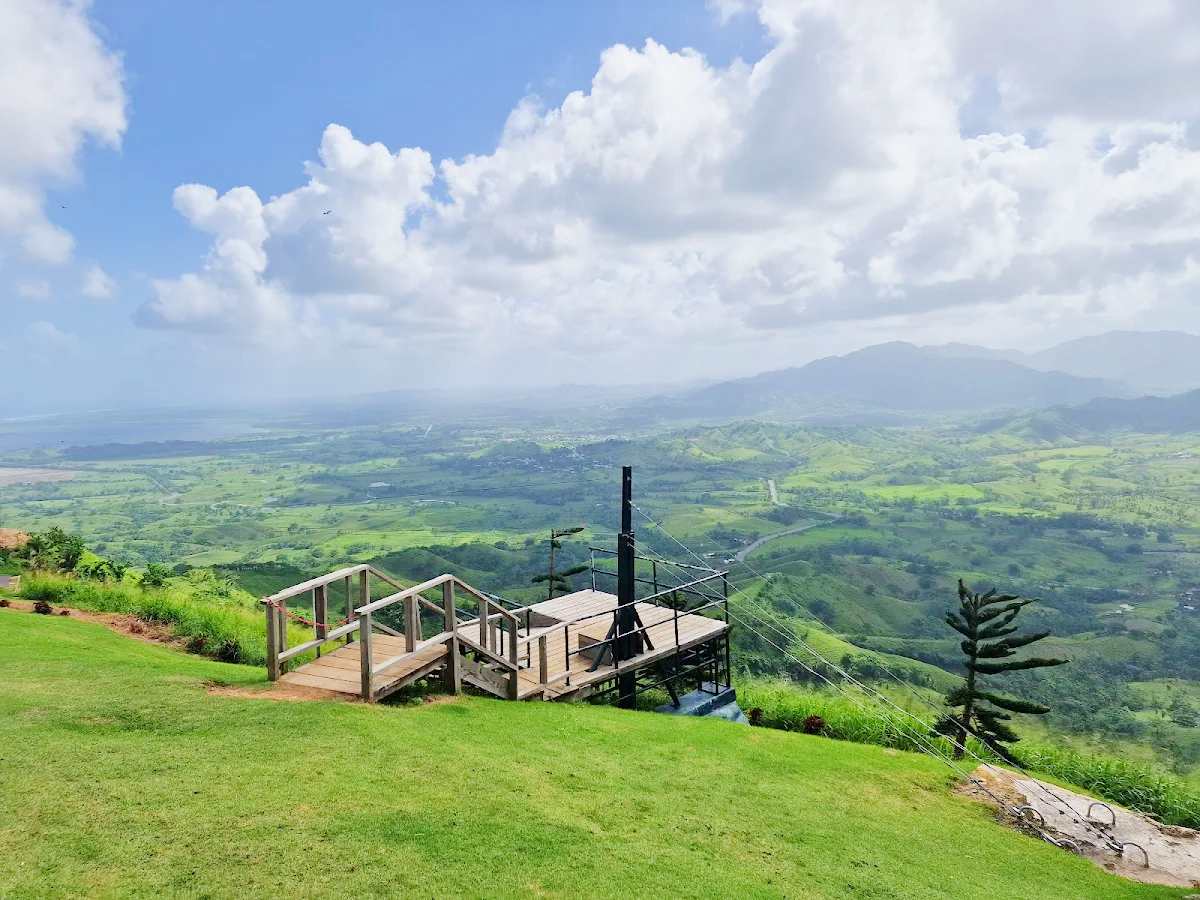

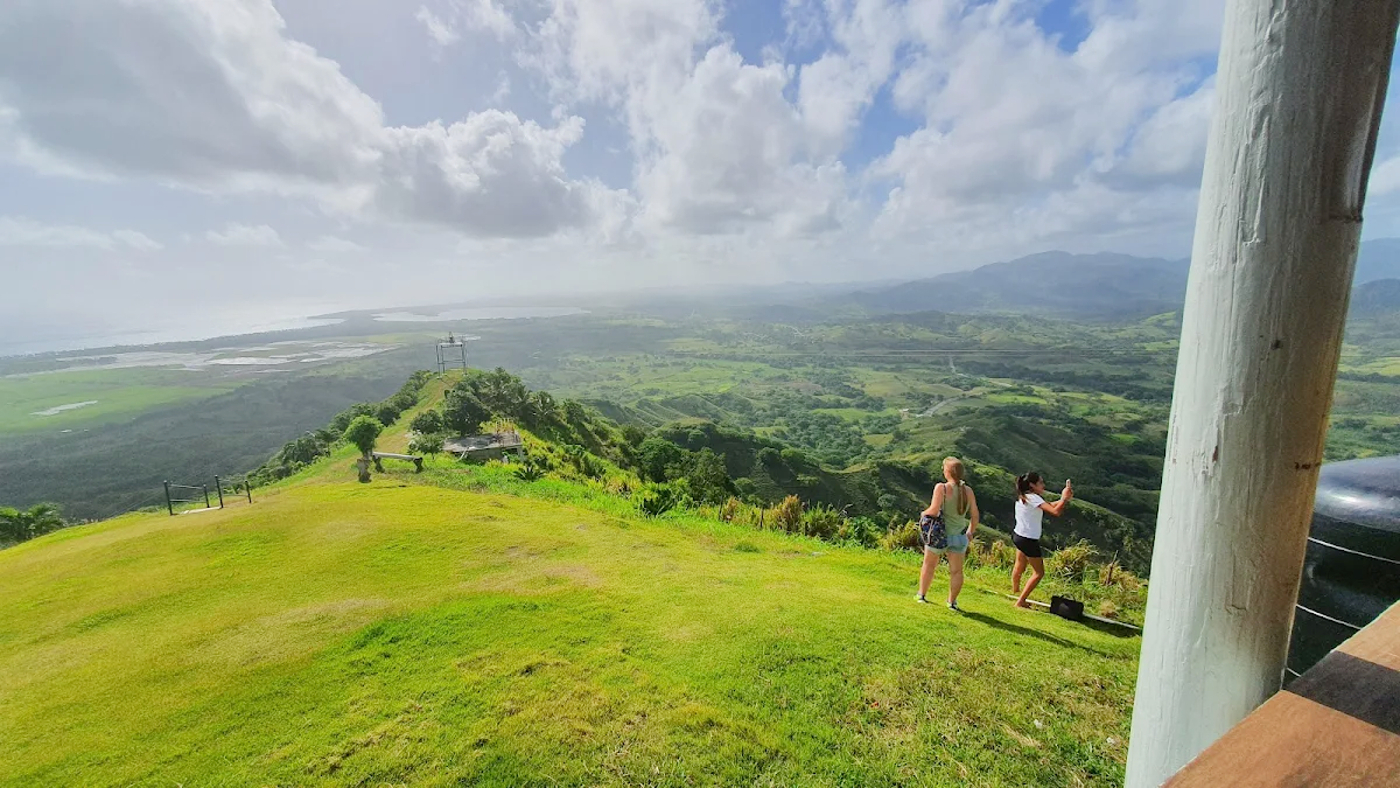

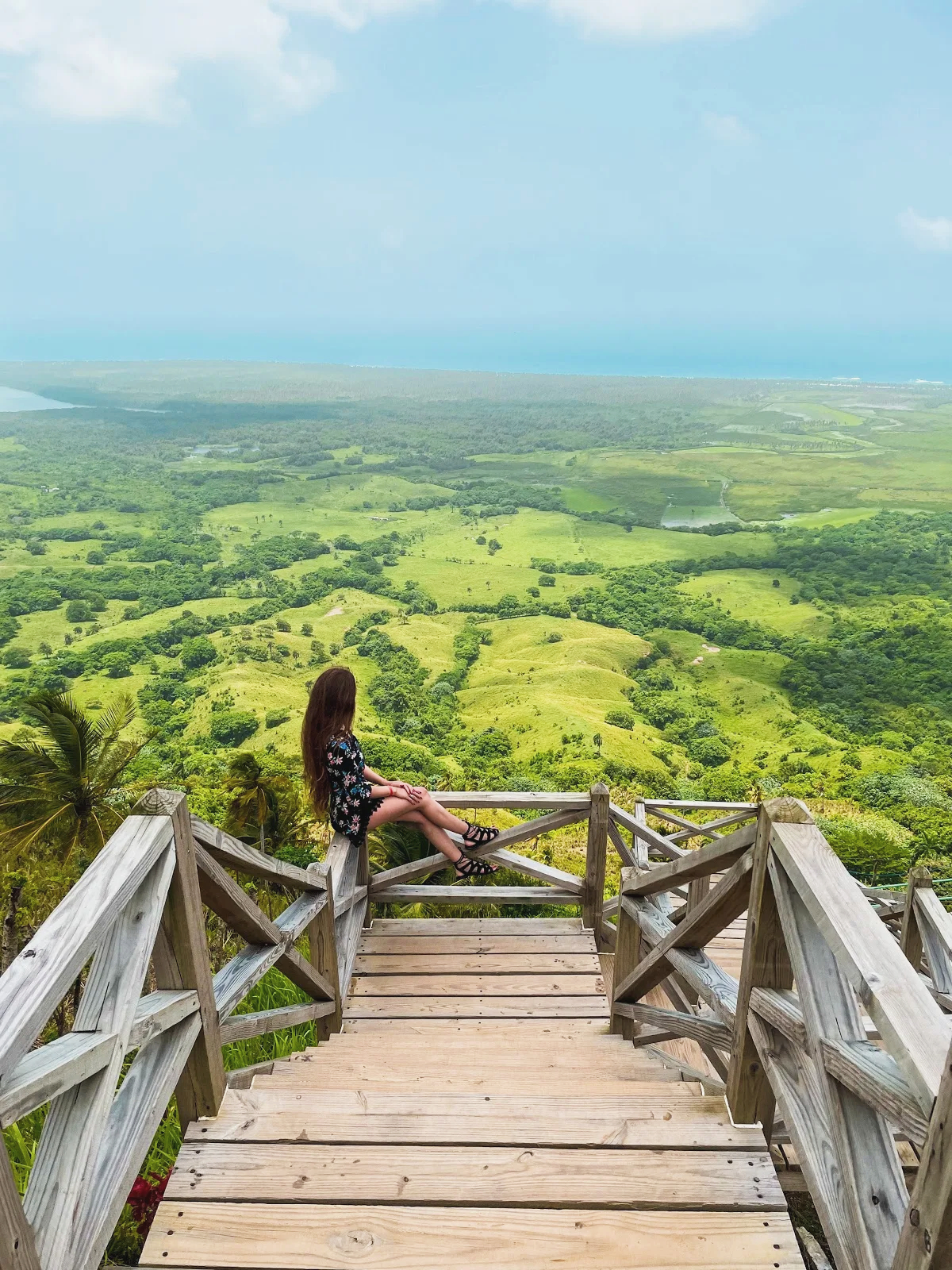

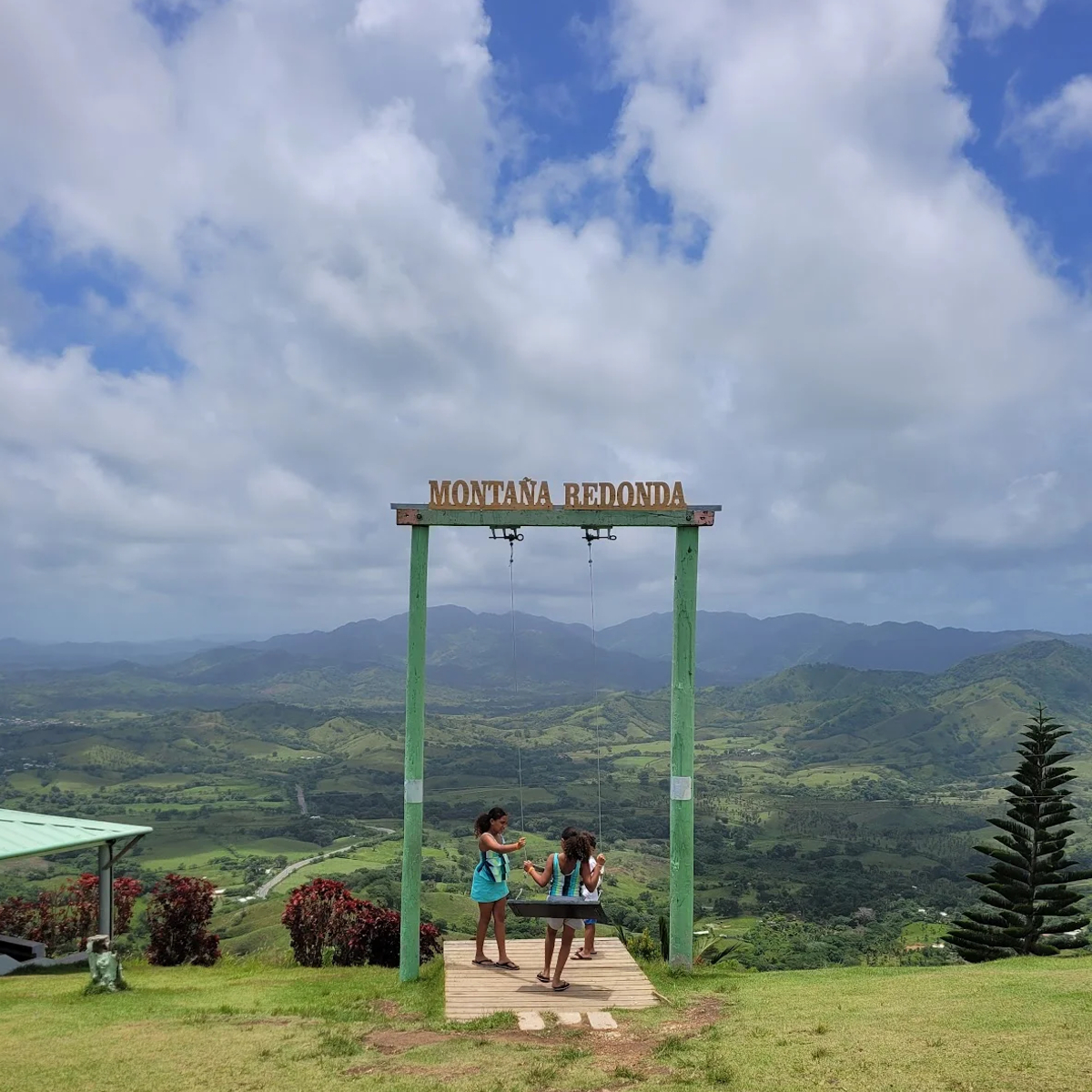

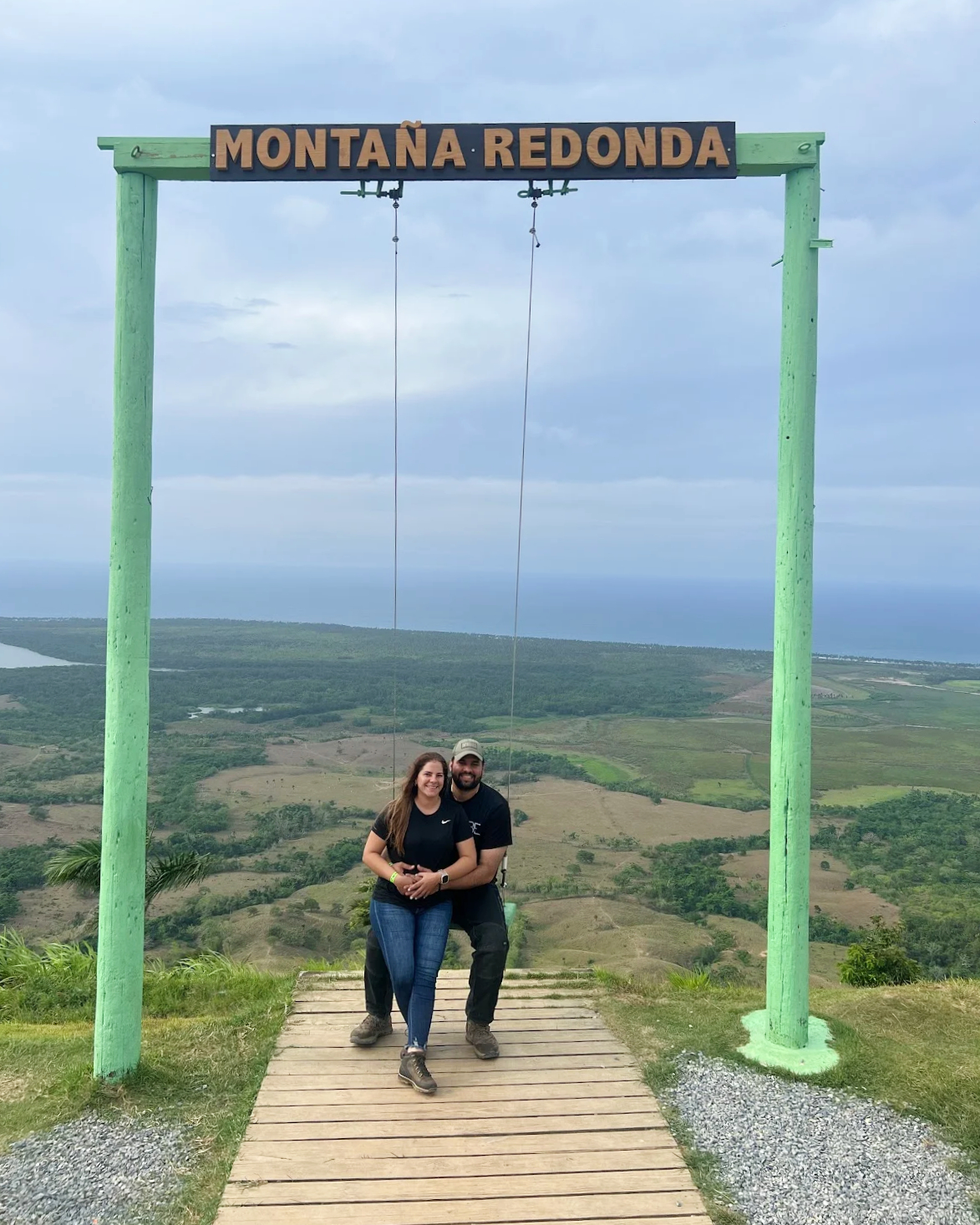

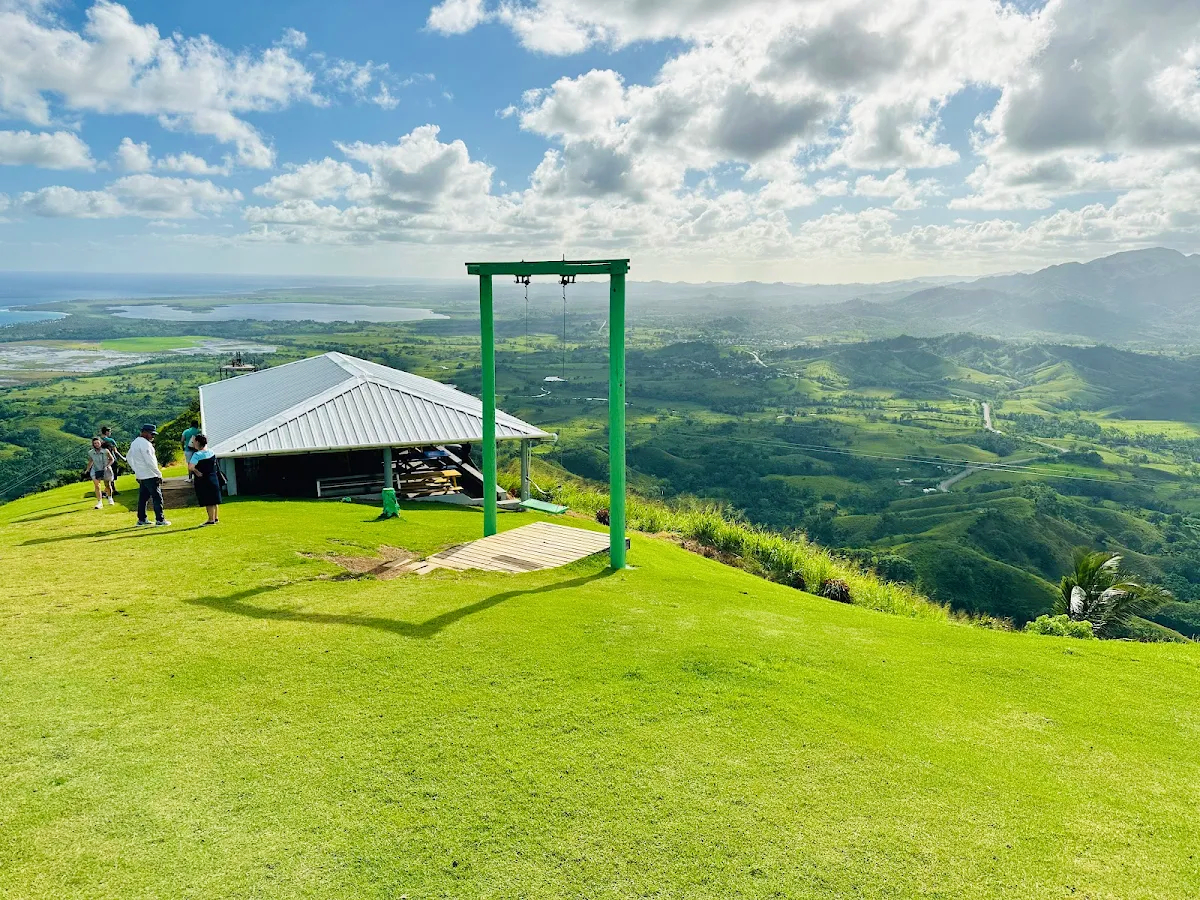

== Tourism development ==
Miches has a great tourism potential. The extension of its beaches, and its irregular coasts creating unique landforms, providing all the means for potential tourism. The area has mangroves, coconut trees, mountains, rivers, waterfalls, caves and tropical forests. The construction of new roads and the announcement of major projects have fostered the development of tourism in Miches, with the appearance of small local businesses (such as restaurants, rental cabins, boat tours, horseback rides on the beach) and the creation of tourism clusters.

Miches will be the location of the project Tropicalia, a sustainable tourism and real estate development of Cisneros Real Estate, a division of Cisneros. Tropicalia will entail an investment of US$310 million and will generate around 1,800 jobs. Since 2008, Tropicalia promotes, through Fundación Tropicalia, the sustainable social and economic development of Miches, working in the areas of environment, education, productivity, and socio-cultural advocacy.

== Locality ==
- Sabana de Nisibón

== Notable Person ==
- Olivia Peguero, artist
