= Pedro Sánchez (disambiguation) =

Pedro Sánchez (born 1972) is the incumbent Prime Minister of Spain.

Pedro Sánchez may also refer to:

== Arts and entertainment ==
- Pedro Sanchez (actor) (1924–1995), Italian performer, a/k/a Ignazio Spalla
- Pedro Sánchez de Castro (fl. 1454–1484), Spanish painter
- Pedro Sánchez Falconete, Spanish architect
- Pedro Sánchez Quintana (born 1952), Spanish journalist and presenter for newscast Telediario
- Pedro Mari Sánchez (born 1954), Spanish actor; see The First Adventure

== Aristocrats and politicians ==
- Pedro Sánchez Gamarra, Peruvian minister of energy and mining in 2008–2011
- Pedro Sánchez de la Hoz (1514–1547), Spanish merchant, conquistador and adelantado
- Pedro Sánchez de Mathos (ca. 1635–1705), Spanish colonial official in Puerto Rico
- Pedro Sánchez de Monteagudo (died 1276), Spanish aristocrat
- Pedro Sánchez Rendón (ca. 1590–1658), Spanish aristocrat, colonial politician in South America
- Pedro Sánchez de Tagle, 2nd Marquis of Altamira (1661–1723), Spanish aristocrat
- Pedro Arnulfo Sánchez (born 1972), Colombian minister of defense
- Pedro C. Sanchez (1925–1987), Guamanian politician and educator, a/k/a Doc Sanchez

== Science and academia ==
- Pedro Sánchez Ciruelo (c. 1465–1548), Spanish mathematician
- Pedro A. Sanchez (1940–2026), Cuban-American soil scientist and World Food Prize Laureate

== Sportsmen ==
- Pedro Sánchez (equestrian) (born 1966), Spanish Olympian in 1988 and 1996
- Pedro Sánchez (footballer, born 1986), Spanish right winger
- Pedro Sánchez (footballer, born 1998), Chilean midfielder
- Pedro Julio Sánchez (born 1940), Colombian cyclist
- Pedro León Sánchez Gil (born 1986), Spanish footballer, a/k/a León

== Other ==
=== Fiction ===
- Pedro Sanchez (Napoleon Dynamite), teenager played by Efren Ramirez in 2004 American film
- Pedro Sánchez (novel), 1883 novel by José María de Pereda

=== Places ===
- Pedro Sánchez (district), municipal administration of El Seibo, Dominican Republic
