= Olivia Peguero =

Painter and sculptor

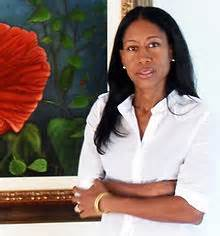
- Born: 1961 (age 64–65); Las Salinas, Barahona Province, Dominican Republic
- Known for: Painting, sculpture
- Website: oliviapeguero.com

Olivia Peguero (born 1961) is a Dominican and American contemporary landscape and botanical painter and sculptor. Painting most of the year in the Dominican Republic and Florida, she is known for producing all of her studies and the majority of her finished pieces en plein air. Unlike many other Dominican artists, her works are created in oil paint, using a more traditional European-style, many times depicting life as birth, existence and death within her flowers. Two common themes present in Peguero art are the conservation of old growth Dominican forests and pride in Dominican heritage.

In 2007, Peguero enlisted the help of a few important collectors and corporate sponsors to form the Peguero Arte Libros Foundation and the Art Books for Education Program. A large percentage of the proceeds from the sale of her art are donated to the foundation.

== Early life and early education ==
Peguero was born in Las Salinas, Barahona Province, and grew up in the small towns of Miches, El Seibo Province, on the east coast, and Las Salinas, Barahona Province, in the southwest. She attended the Mahatma Gandhi secondary school in Santo Domingo and after graduation, moved to New York City, to join her parents who had immigrated a few years prior.

Although she was mostly isolated from the arts as a child, she was strongly influenced by the Dutch Masters style and it seemed only natural that the same style be applied in a lush, Caribbean environment. Today, many people associate Peguero art as only tropical or island oriented, but much of her work and training focused on mastering traditional architectural, botanical and landscape methods with her early paintings often being completed in and around the Lake District in England.

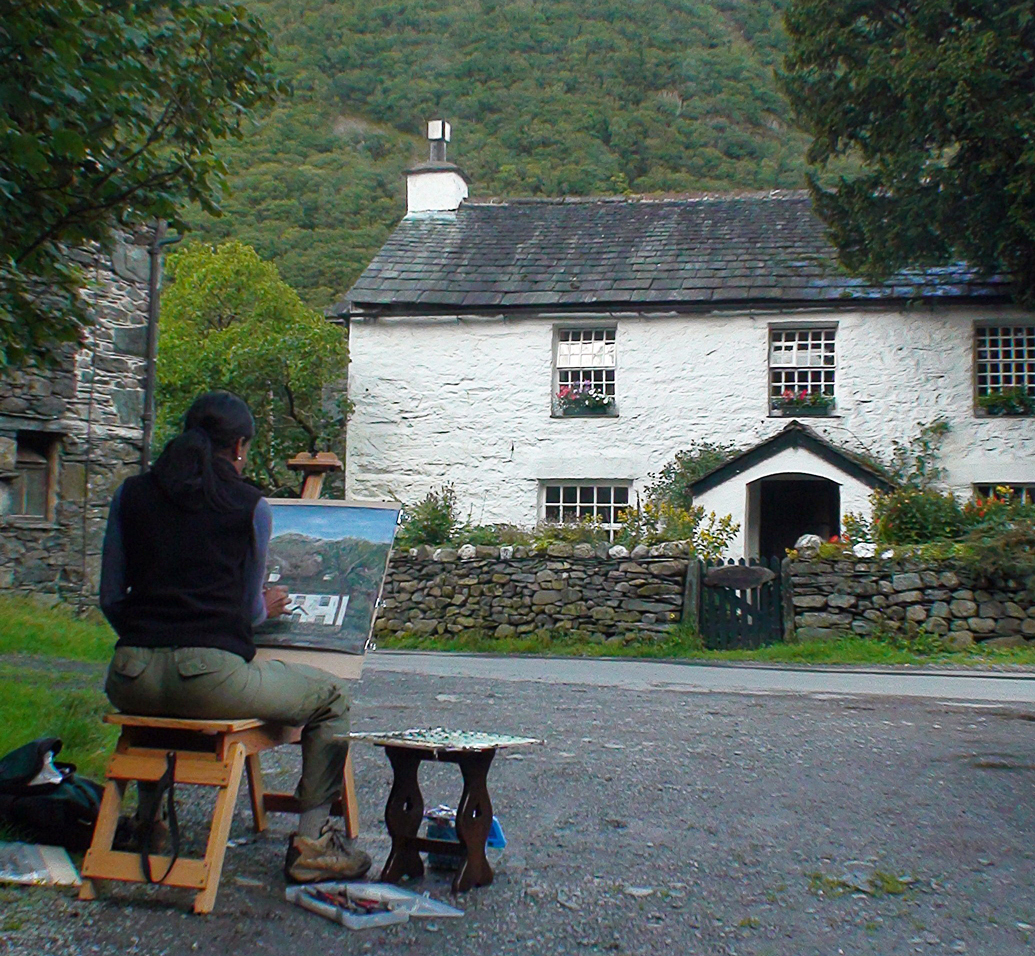
Olivia Peguero painting in the hamlet of Stonethwaite, Lake District National Park, England

== Training and university education ==
Peguero attended university in New York and Florida and continued to refine her style during the course of her training. She completed a bachelor's degree of fine art studio painting from Florida Atlantic University, Florida; a bachelor's degree in management information systems from Mercy College, New York; and a master's degree in business administration from Nova Southeastern University, Florida.

== Peguero Arte Libros Foundation ==
Peguero is the founder of the Peguero Arte Libros Foundations and the Art Books for Education Project that focuses on art education for young Dominican children in rural areas. In 2007, the case was presented that even today, many Dominican children in rural areas are not exposed to and do not have the opportunity to learn fine arts such as painting, sculpture, poetry and story writing. And for a country so rich in the music and dance arts to not have an emphasis in these areas was a loss for every child. One of the programs currently under implementation by the foundation is to supply rural schools with a set of Spanish language art books that cover painting, sculpture, poetry and story writing. These would then be given to the school for their library and as some schools do not have a library, it would be the start of a long-term collection to benefit all students. In early 2013, the Peguero Foundation started a second major program called "Education for Rural Children". It focuses on keeping young children from rural farm areas in school and out of the fields. The initiation of the program included onsite visits and partnerships with agricultural businesses that work directly with rural families and a push to help ensure those families understand the value of their children's education.

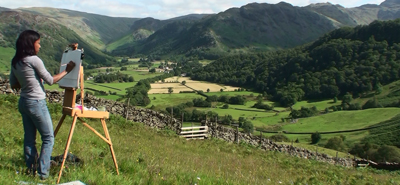
Summer Hay in Borrowdale, (2003)—Borrowdale, Lake District, England

== Art and the preservation of the Dominican Rainforest ==
The Mariposa Cocoa Preserve is a private preservation initiative owned and run by the Peguero family that combines sustainable organic cocoa farming practices and forest management with the protection of wildlife and nature. Located just west of Miches, the preserve is only accessible via footpath and horseback. The countryside within the preserve was a primary landscape subject in many of the earliest Peguero paintings. Tours of the Mariposa Cocoa Preserve are by invitation only with an annual artist expedition.

== Two eco-political works on loan to the Art in Embassies Program ==
In 2019 two major Peguero art works were loaned to the United States Department of State, Art in Embassies Program to be displayed in the Chișinău, Moldova exhibition. The first painting, “The Emerald Hills of Quisqueya” (2003) was produced with symbolism intended to cast a light onto the social and environmental issues she was seeing while working in the Dominican Republic countryside. The second work “The Cow on the Beach” (2017) was created to document the landscapes surrounding Miches prior to new tourist development and the effects of climate change.

== See also ==
- List of 20th-century women artists
- List of Dominican painters
- List of Nova Southeastern University alumni
- List of people from Florida
- List of people from New York City
- List of sculptors
