= Pedro Sánchez (district) =

Area of the Dominican Republic

Coordinates: 18.864°N 69.109°W

Pedro Sánchez is a municipal district of the Santa Cruz del Seibo municipality in the El Seibo province, Dominican Republic. It was founded in 1927 by the Dominican president Horacio Vásquez.

== Adventure and ecotourism ==
Pedro Sánchez is located in the ecological corridor of the eastern mountain range of the Dominican Republic. It is a small village of approximately 6500 inhabitants surrounded by rolling hills that hold the treasures of numerous natural attractions. The natural attractions include two large waterfalls (saltos), numerous swimming holes, and more than 20 caves where indigenous "Taíno" Indians once lived.

The locals are transforming the community into an environmentally conscious community that will offer adventure Ecotourism. Interpretive excursions are currently available to “Salto Grande” and “Salto Cucuyo”, where visitors can interact with the local guides and swim in the natural springs. Visitors can also arrive at the indigenous caves of the mountain range known as "El Grumo". The trained guides and visitors can enter a number of caves to view stalactites and stalagmites formed over thousands and thousands of years ago. The excursions are complemented by Dominican style dishes and cultural presentations that the locals perform with pride.
