= Pedro Sánchez Rendón =

Spanish politician

Protector General de Naturales of Buenos Aires
- In office 1650–1658
- Monarch: Philip IV

Personal details
- Born: c. 1590 Jerez de la Frontera, Cádiz, Spain
- Died: August 19, 1658 Buenos Aires, Viceroyalty of Peru
- Spouse: Catalina Tapia
- Occupation: Politician
- Profession: Lawyer

Pedro Sánchez Rendón (c. 1590–1658) was a Spanish politician, who served during the Viceroyalty of Peru as Mayordomo of Hospital, and Protector of Natural resources and minors of Buenos Aires.

Born in Jerez de la Frontera, was the son of Ramón Palomino Sarmiento and Ana Sánchez, belonging to distinguished lineages. His wife was Catalina Tapia, daughter of Ñuño Fernández Lobo, a nobleman born in Olivenza, and Juana de Valdenebro Guillen, born in Talavera de la Reina.
