= Sabana de Nisibón =

Coordinates: 18.9555°N 68.8094°W

Sabana de Nisibón is a small town in the Dominican Republic.
