= Ñuño Fernández Lobo =

Personal details
- Born: 16th Century Olivença, Portugal
- Died: 17th century Buenos Aires, Viceroyalty of Peru
- Occupation: Politician; Landowner
- Profession: Army's officer

Military service
- Allegiance: Spanish Empire
- Branch/service: Spanish Army
- Rank: Captain

Ñuño Fernández Lobo (c.1590–1650s) was a Portuguese nobleman, who served as conquistador of Tucumán. He obtained land grants in Buenos Aires, where he settled with his family.

== Biography ==
Born in Olivença, he was the son of Afonso Lobo and Isabel Mendes Britos, belonging to a noble Lusitanian family. In 1629, he came to Buenos Aires with his wife Juana Valdenebro. The family had arrived from Tucuman, being escorted in the trip by mercenaries hired by the same Ñuño Fernández Lobo.

Ñuño Fernández Lobo established his residence permanently in Buenos Aires, serving as Captain of militia in the El Presidio de Buenos Aires. He received land grants, and ordered to build a farm in the area Río de Las Conchas (Buenos Aires Province).
