= El Seibo Province =

Province of the Dominican Republic

El Seibo
- Province
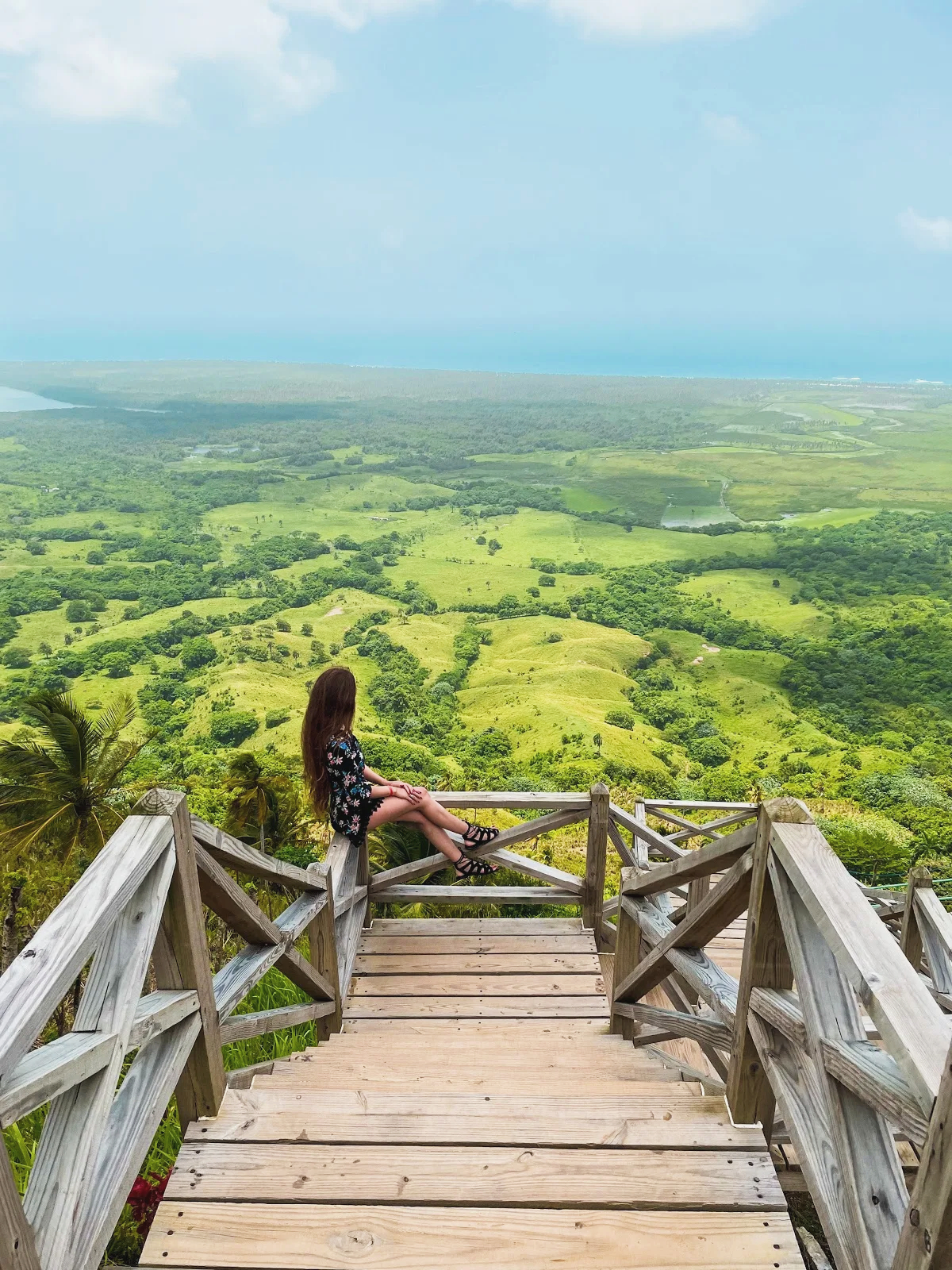
- Round Mountain in Miches, El Seibo, Dominican Republic
- Motto: The patriot and brave
- Location of the El Seibo Province
- Country: Dominican Republic
- Province since: 1844
- Capital: Santa Cruz de El Seibo

Government
  - Type: Subdivisions
  - Body: 2 municipalities 5 municipal districts
  - Congresspersons: 1 Senator; 2 Deputies

Area
  - Total: 1,786.80 km^{2} (689.89 sq mi)

Population (2014)
  - Total: 110,212
  - Density: 61.6812/km^{2} (159.754/sq mi)
- Time zone: UTC-4 (EST)
- Area code: 1-809 1-829 1-849
- ISO 3166-2: DO-08
- Postal Code: 24000

El Seibo (Spanish pronunciation: [el ˈsejβo]), alternatively spelt El Seybo, is a province of the Dominican Republic. Before 1992 it included what is now Hato Mayor province.

== History ==
El Seibo was founded in 1502 by Juan de Esquivel, a notable a Spanish conquistador. The name of Santa Cruz de El Seibo, is taken from the Spanish custom of placing the Cross of Christ at the cardinal points, as protection against evils. A cross called Asomante is still preserved, in the West Sector of the city of El Seibo.

The name of Seibo comes from a tribal chief of the Taíno race, who was called Seebo. This Seebo was a regional leader, and subject to the provisions of the Chiefdom de Higuey: Cayacoha. By 1504, the Spaniards Juan Briceño and Francisco Almenara appear as residents of the area, paying the fifth to the Real Caja del Rey.

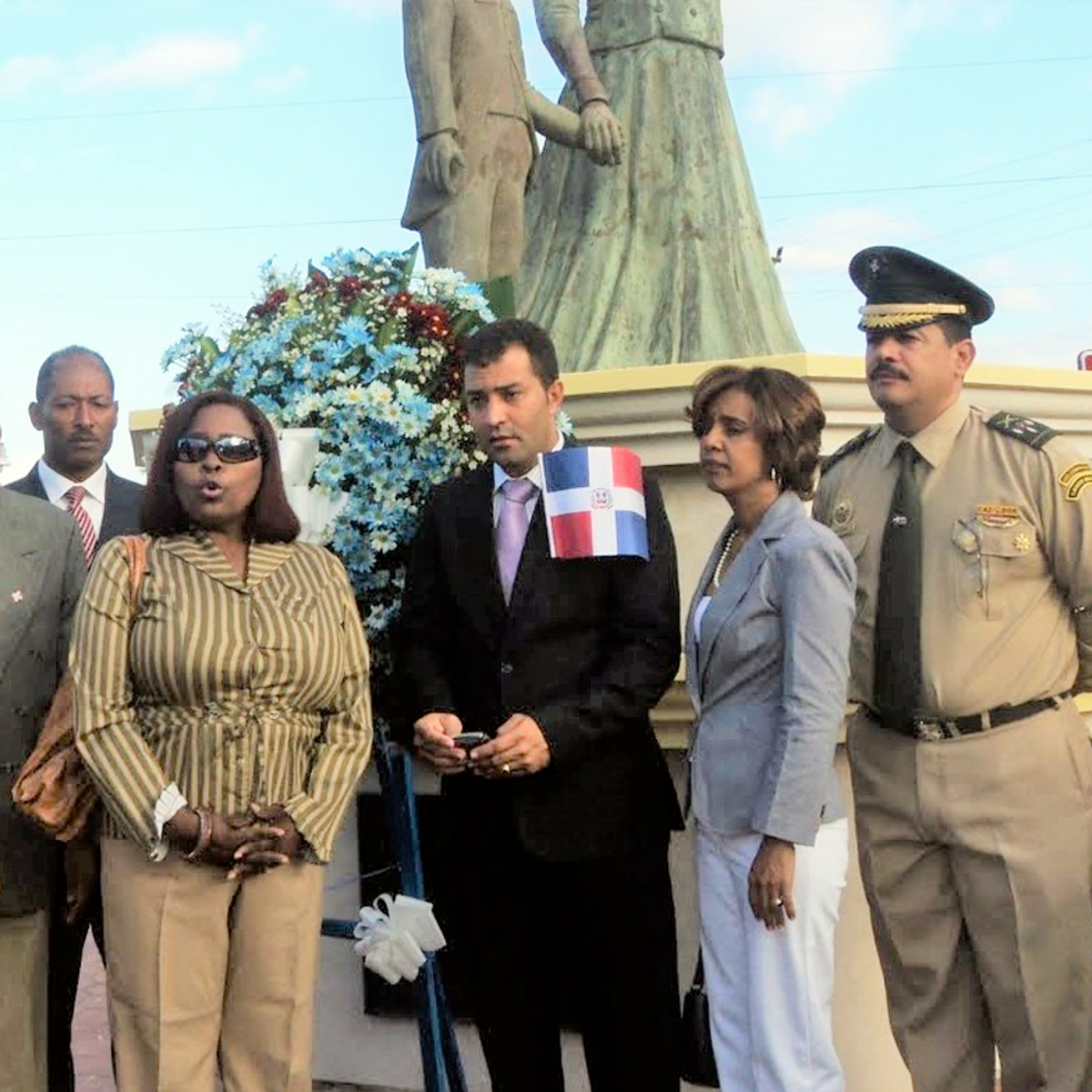
People in El Seibo, Dominican Republic

A relevant event for the achievement of Spanish interests occurred in Hidalga Villa de Santa Cruz de Hicayagua, at the time of the reconquest: the Battle of Palo Hincado. This battle took place in what is today kilometer 3.5 of the El Seibo-Hato Mayor highway, on November 7, 1808, the troops of Napoleon Bonaparte, French Emperor, and an army of Creoles under the command of General Juan Sánchez Ramírez.

== Politics ==
In the 2020 elections, one senator and three deputies were elected for the province. The senator is Santiago José Zorrilla from the Modern Revolutionary Party (PRM). The deputies are Kenia Milagros Mejía Mercedes of the Dominican Liberation Party (PLD), Juan Maldonado Castro (PRD), and Juan Roberto Rodríguez Hernández (PRD).

== Municipalities and municipal districts ==
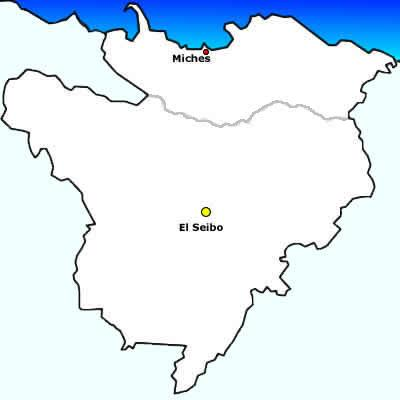
Municipalities of El Seibo Province, Dominican Republic

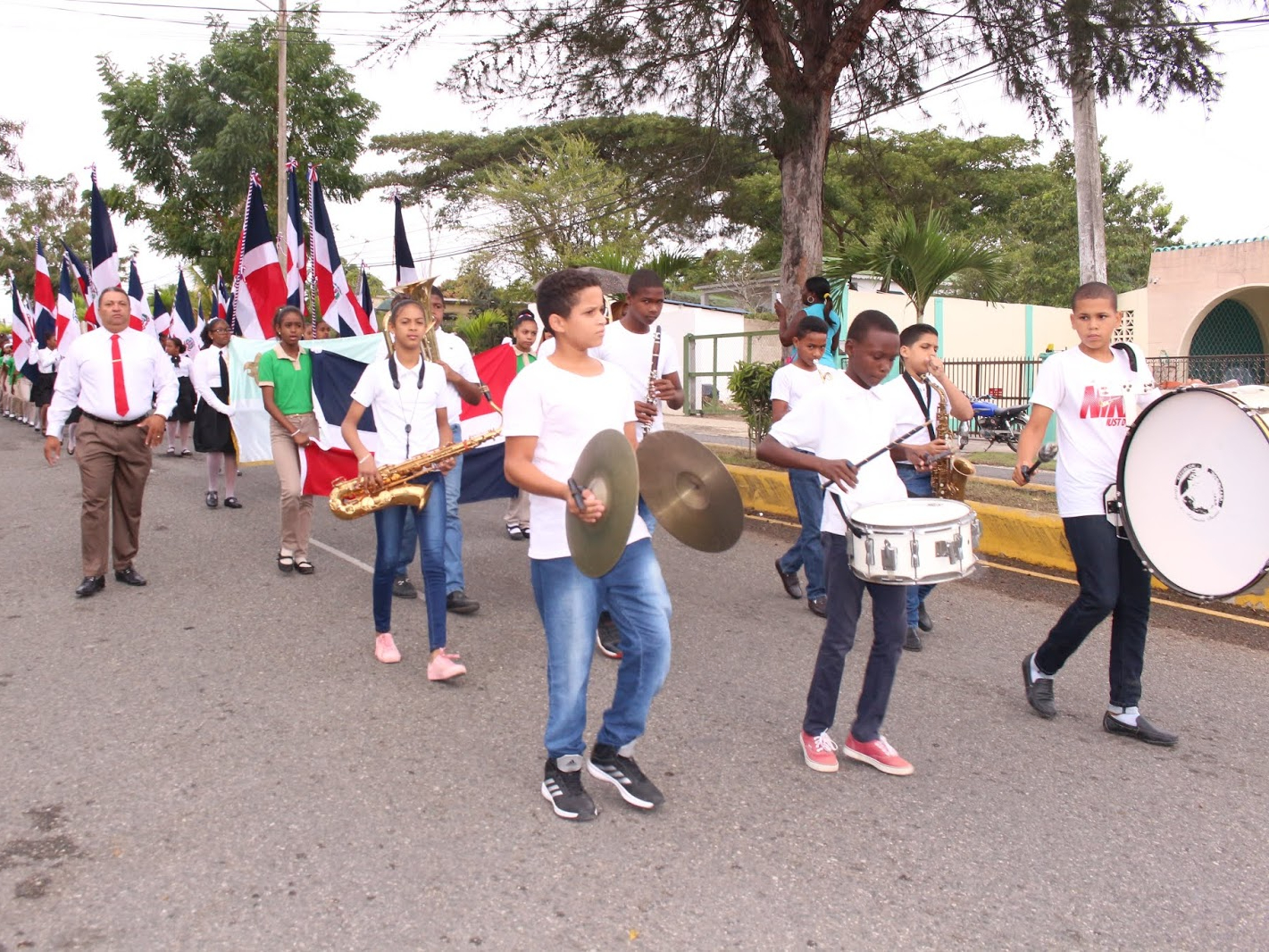
El Seibo, Dominican Republic school students

The province as of June 20, 2006 is divided into the following municipalities (municipios) and municipal districts (distrito municipal - M.D.) within them:

1. Santa Cruz de El Seibo, head municipality of the province
  1. Pedro Sánchez (M.D.)
  2. San Francisco-Vicentillo (M.D.)
  3. Santa Lucía (M.D.)
2. Miches
  1. El Cedro (M.D.)
  2. La Gina (M.D.)

The following is a sortable table of the municipalities and municipal districts with population figures as of the 2014 estimate. Urban population are those living in the seats (cabeceras, literally heads) of municipalities or of municipal districts. Rural population are those living in the districts (secciones, literally sections) and neighborhoods (Pparajes, literally places) outside them. The population figures are from the 2014 population estimate. For comparison with the municipalities and municipal districts of other provinces see the list of municipalities and municipal districts of the Dominican Republic.

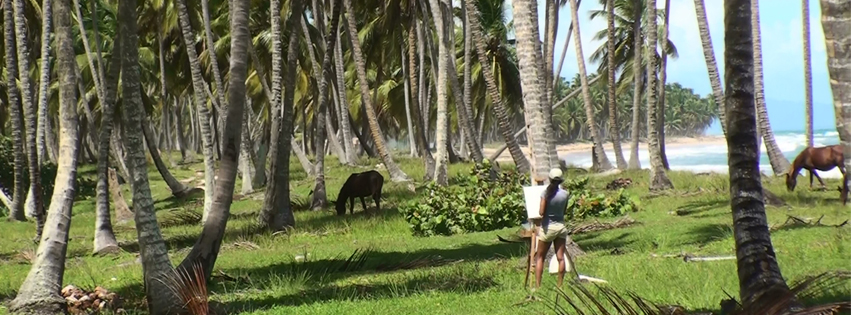
Miches, El Seibo, Dominican Republic beach

Name	Total population	Urban population	Rural population
Miches	23,141	2,041	21,100
Santa Cruz de El Seibo	87,071	72,551	14,520
El Seibo Province	110,212	74,592	35,620

For comparison with the municipalities and municipal districts of other provinces see the list of municipalities and municipal districts of the Dominican Republic.

== Notable people ==
- Charytin singer and actress, born in the town of Santa Lucia
- Carlos Febles - baseball player and coach
