= El Seibo, Dominican Republic =

City in the Dominican Republic

Santa Cruz del Seibo El Seibo
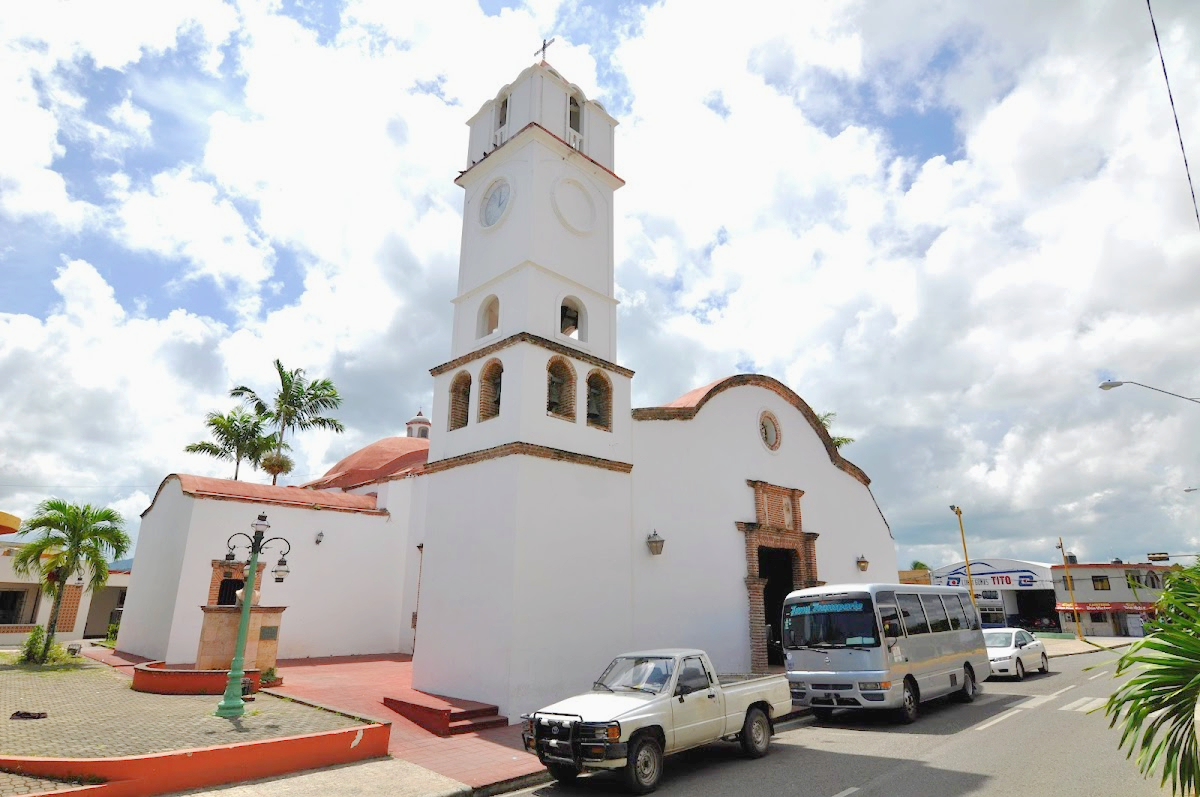
- Church of El Seibo Dominican Republic

- Coat of arms

- Location within the Dominican Republic
- Coordinates: 18°46′12″N 69°2′24″W
- Country: Dominican Republic
- Province: El Seibo
- Founded: 1502
- Municipality since: 1844

Area
  - Total: 1,344.33 km^{2} (519.05 sq mi)
- Elevation: 117 m (384 ft)

Population (2012)
  - Total: 97,144
  - Density: 72.262/km^{2} (187.16/sq mi)
  - Demonym: Seibano(a)
- Distance to – Santo Domingo: 135 km
- Municipalities: 3
- Climate: Am

Santa Cruz del Seibo or El Seibo, is a city and municipality in the El Seibo Province of the Dominican Republic, located in the eastern part of the country.

== History ==
El Seibo is one of the oldest towns in the country, it was created by the Constitution of November 6, 1844 although it already existed as a territorial division since colonial times, for this reason its foundation dates back to 1502 by the Spanish conqueror Juan de Esquivel. The name of Seibo comes from a tribal chief of Taino race.

The name of Santa Cruz del Seibo, is taken from the Spanish custom of placing the Cruz de Cristo (Holy Cross) in the cardinal points, as protection against evils. A cross called Asomante is still preserved, in the West Sector of the city of El Seibo.

== Economy ==
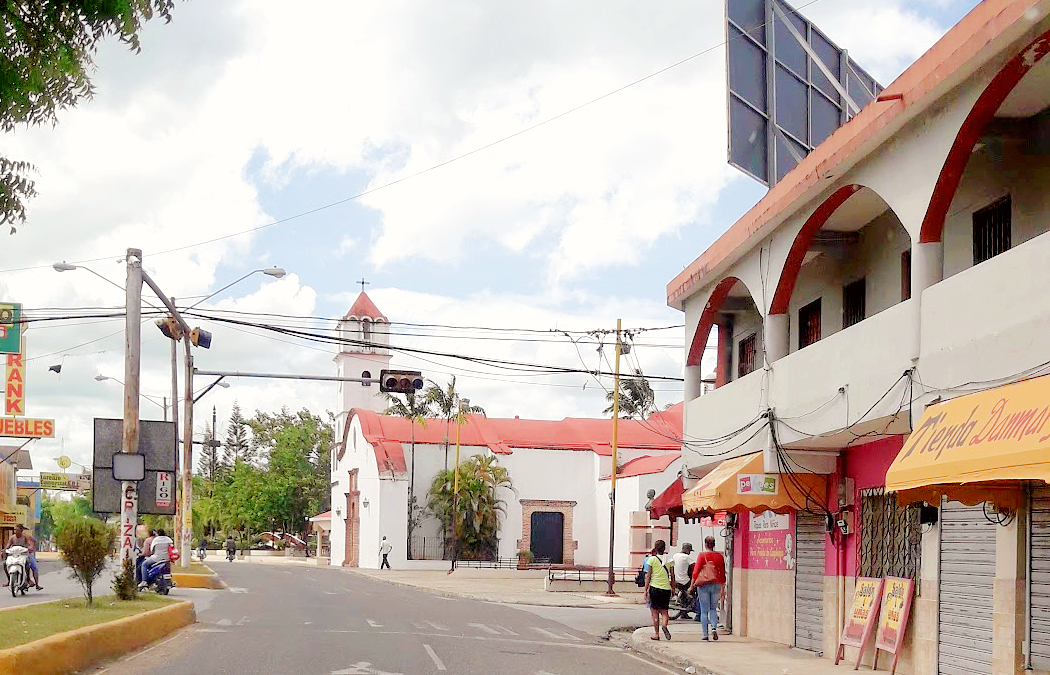
El Seibo. Dominican Republic streets.

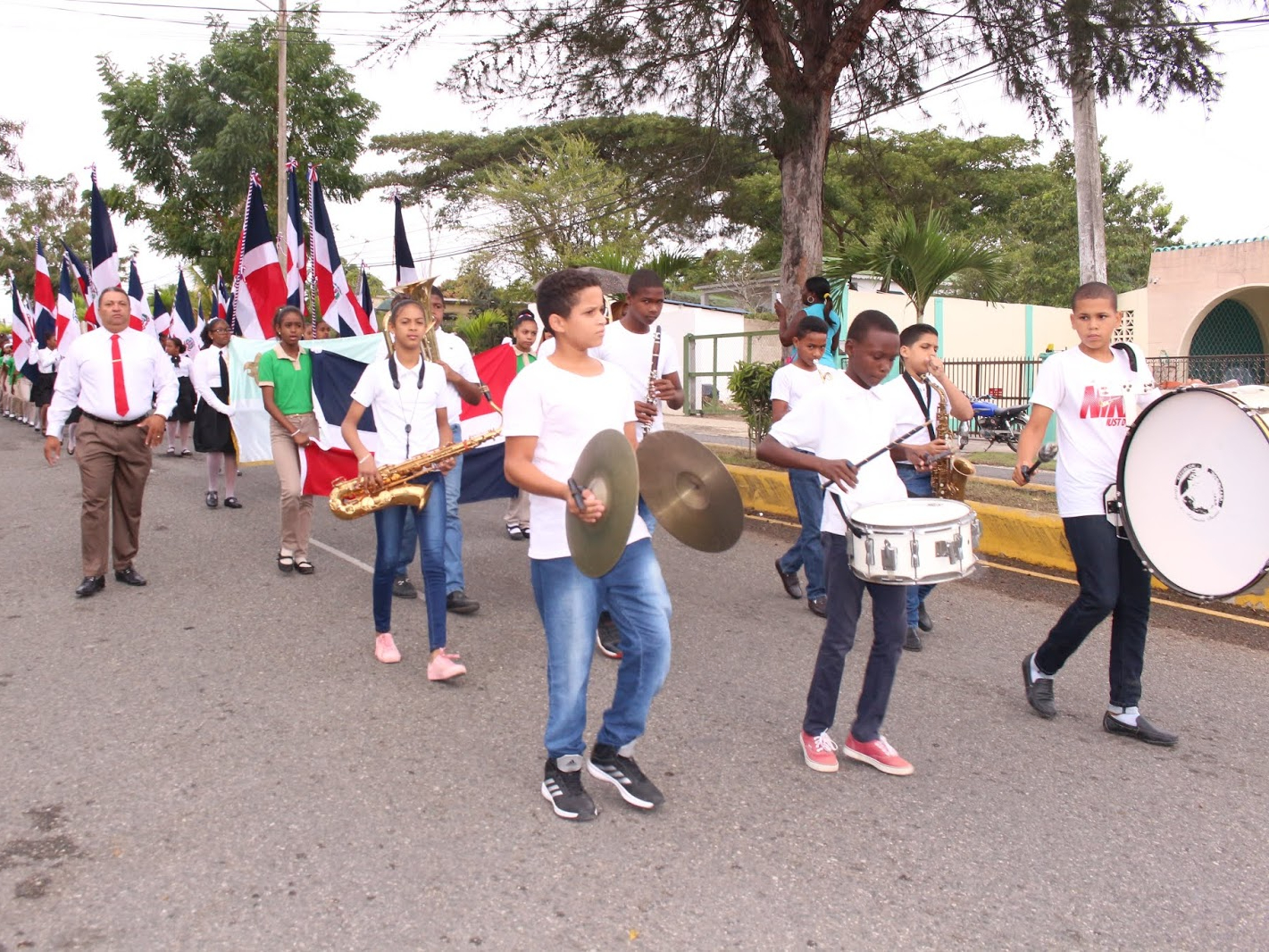
School students in El Seibo, Dominican Republic.

In the municipality there has been a factory for more than 100 years that produces a refreshing drink called mabí, made from the stem of a plant called Indian bejuco and cane sugar. It is currently the second cocoa-producing province, it is estimated that it produces about 132,000 quintals of cocoa per year, which contributes significantly to the economy of its municipalities. Another agricultural line of great impact is dual-purpose livestock (meat and milk). According to statistics from the Adolfo Mercedes breeders' association, meat production is around 3.2 million kilos per year and milk production is around 45.6 million kilos. liters per year.

== Notable residents ==
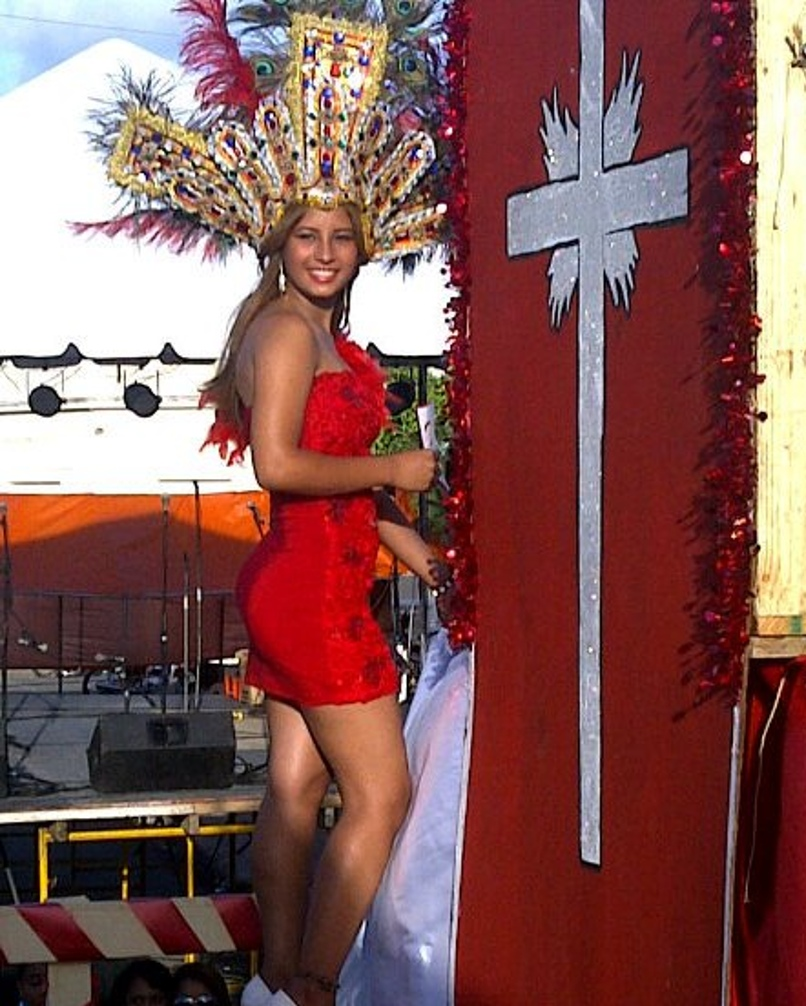
Woman in carnival of El Seibo, Dominican Republic.

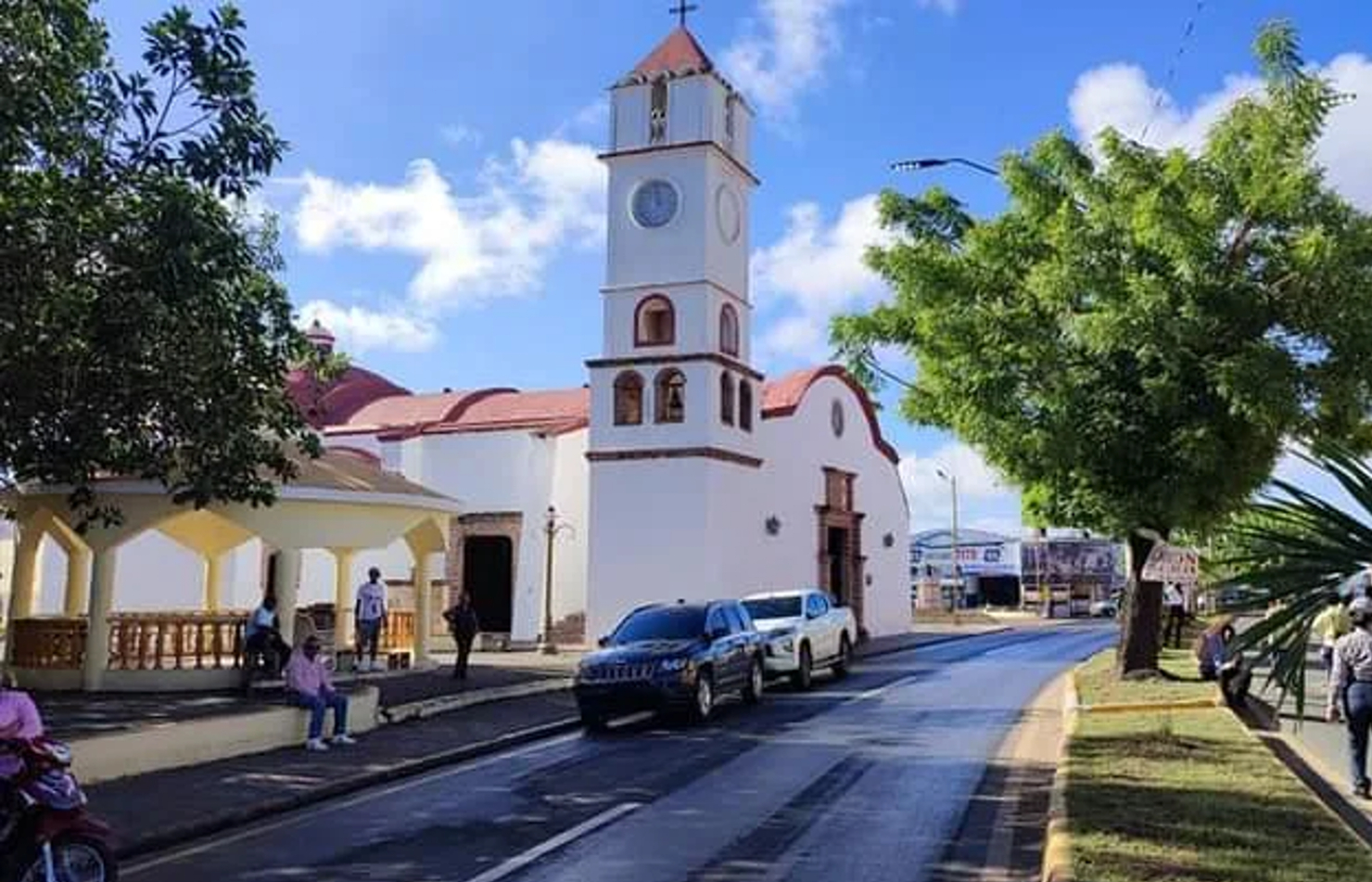
Church and street of El Seibo, Dominican Republic.

Some of the distinguished people from El Seibo include Manuela Díez, mother of Juan Pablo Duarte, Cesáreo Guillermo and Alexander Woss y Gil, who were Presidents of the Republic. In addition, Monsignor Octavio A. Beras, Archbishop of Santo Domingo and Cardinal of the Catholic Church and Minerva Bernardino, who represented the country in several international events and defended women's rights, were also from Santa Cruz del Seibo, as well as world-renowned and respected tenor, Francisco Chahin Casanova. Also famed baseball player César Jerónimo (Jr). Famous psychiatrist and public personality: Dr. Máximo Beras Goico; TV personality, actor and comedian: Freddy Beras Goico, and pop singer and TV personality Charytín. Legendary Dominican General Antonio Duvergé of French origin who served in the Dominican War of Independence settle in El Seibo and later in San Cristóbal.

== Attractions ==
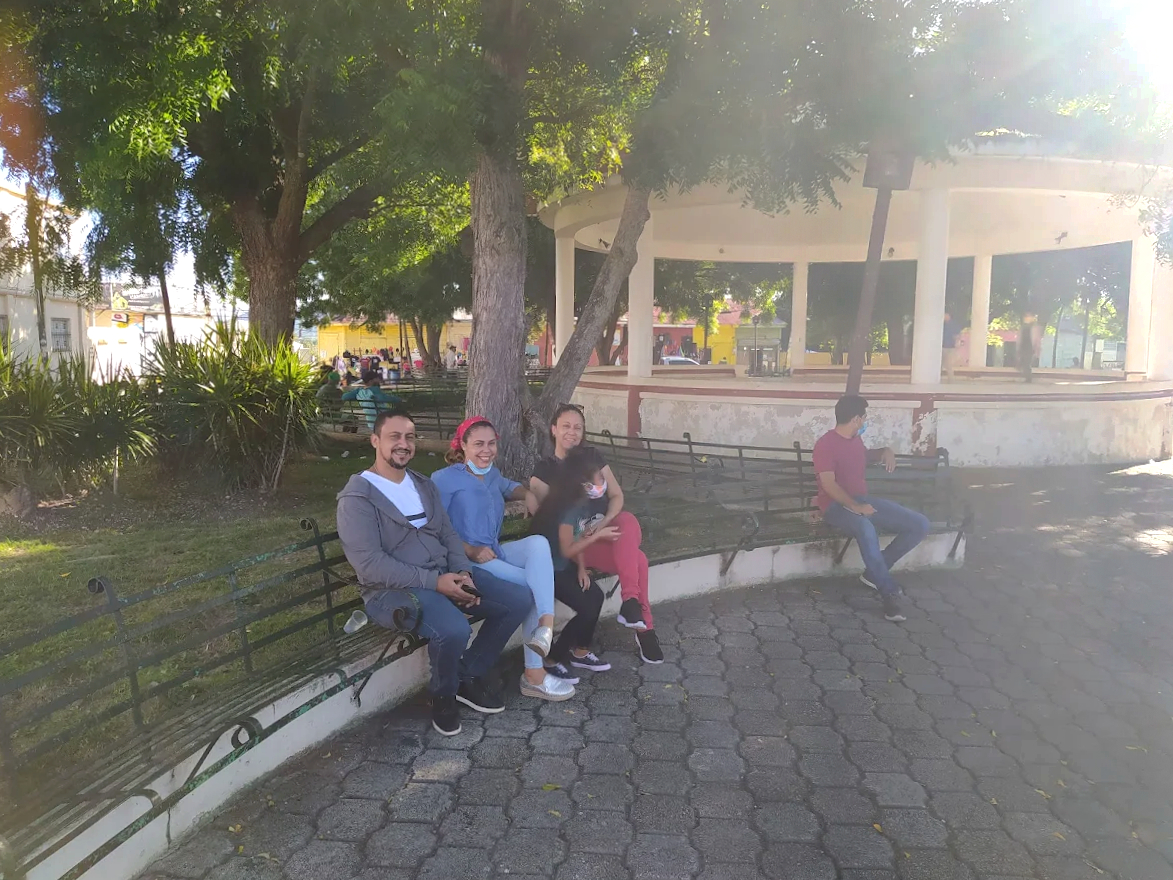
Park of El Seibo, Dominican Republic.

El Seibo, which venerates Saint Cruz with great fervor, have celebrations to honour this saint from 1 May to 10 May. It is the only city in the country that in its supervisory celebrations organizes bullfights.

Another attraction of the supervisory celebrations is the popular vigil of "atabales", a type of popular percussive music. These celebrations enjoy great popularity in all sectors of the community.

== Climate ==
El Seibo has a relatively dry tropical monsoon climate (Köppen Am).

Climate data for El Seibo, Dominican Republic (1961-1990)
Month	Jan	Feb	Mar	Apr	May	Jun	Jul	Aug	Sep	Oct	Nov	Dec	Year
Record high °C (°F)	36.0 (96.8)	38.4 (101.1)	38.5 (101.3)	37.5 (99.5)	38.5 (101.3)	38.5 (101.3)	39.0 (102.2)	40.6 (105.1)	39.8 (103.6)	39.0 (102.2)	38.6 (101.5)	37.0 (98.6)	40.6 (105.1)
Mean daily maximum °C (°F)	30.1 (86.2)	30.5 (86.9)	31.4 (88.5)	31.9 (89.4)	32.2 (90.0)	32.9 (91.2)	33.4 (92.1)	33.6 (92.5)	33.4 (92.1)	32.8 (91.0)	31.6 (88.9)	30.4 (86.7)	32.0 (89.6)
Daily mean °C (°F)	24.2 (75.6)	24.3 (75.7)	24.9 (76.8)	25.5 (77.9)	26.2 (79.2)	27.0 (80.6)	27.4 (81.3)	27.5 (81.5)	27.2 (81.0)	26.7 (80.1)	25.6 (78.1)	24.5 (76.1)	25.9 (78.6)
Mean daily minimum °C (°F)	18.4 (65.1)	18.1 (64.6)	18.5 (65.3)	19.2 (66.6)	20.3 (68.5)	21.0 (69.8)	21.5 (70.7)	21.5 (70.7)	21.0 (69.8)	20.7 (69.3)	19.8 (67.6)	18.7 (65.7)	19.9 (67.8)
Record low °C (°F)	12.9 (55.2)	12.0 (53.6)	11.5 (52.7)	12.5 (54.5)	15.0 (59.0)	16.5 (61.7)	17.0 (62.6)	17.0 (62.6)	16.0 (60.8)	17.0 (62.6)	15.2 (59.4)	12.0 (53.6)	11.5 (52.7)
Average rainfall mm (inches)	57.3 (2.26)	50.5 (1.99)	57.2 (2.25)	107.5 (4.23)	185.3 (7.30)	108.3 (4.26)	74.8 (2.94)	134.1 (5.28)	170.0 (6.69)	193.5 (7.62)	126.6 (4.98)	86.4 (3.40)	1,351.5 (53.21)
Average rainy days (≥ 1.0 mm)	8.7	6.0	5.8	8.3	11.0	8.3	8.7	9.5	12.2	13.9	11.1	9.8	113.3
Source: NOAA
