= Miss Mundo Dominicana 2005 =

- Date: July 11, 2005
- Venue: Renaissance Auditorio de Festival del Hotel Jaragua, Santo Domingo, Dominican Republic
- Broadcaster: Telemicro Canal 5
- Entrants: 28
- Debuts: Com. Dom. Pennsylvania, Com. Dom. Rhode Island
- Winner: Elisa Abreu de los Santos; La Vega

The Miss Mundo Dominicana 2005 pageant was held on July 11, 2005, with 28 candidates competing for the national crown. The winner, Elisa Abreu de los Santos, represented the Dominican Republic at the Miss World 2005.

== Results ==
Final results	Contestant
Miss Mundo Dominicana 2005	La Vega - Elisa Abreu
1st Runner-up	Com. Dom. Pennsylvania - Joanie Polanco
2nd Runner-up	Puerto Plata - Yudith Morales
3rd Runner-up	María Trinidad Sánchez - Yamel Mora
4th Runner-up	Peravia - Daniela Peguero
5th Runner-up	Distrito Nacional - Natasha Romero
Top 14	Santiago - Joselyn Taveras; Samaná - Elizabeth Santana; Espaillat - Laura Jiménez; Monte Plata - Marta Reynoso; San Juan - Sandra Cruz; Duarte - Exilia Martínez; Com. Dom. Rhode Island - Marilin Tatís; San Cristóbal - Lucía de Lara

=== Fast Track Awards ===
- Miss Internet* (voted by viewers in Miss Mundo Dominicana Official Website) - Exilia Martínez (Duarte)
- Sport Miss* - Lucía de Lara (San Cristóbal)
- Best Beach Dominican Beauty* - Marta Reynoso (Monte Plata)
- Beauty with a Purpose* - Joanie Polanco (Com. Dom. Pennsylvania)
- *Classify to the Semifinals.

=== Special awards ===
- Miss Photogenic (voted by press reporters) - Lorraine Peralta (Com. Dom. Miami)
- Miss Congeniality (voted by contestants) - Anna Merán (La Romana)
- Miss Elegancia - Yudith Morales (Puerto Plata)

=== Miss Dominican Regions ===
- Miss Exterior : Joanie Polanco (Com. Dom. Pennsylvania)
- Miss Region del Centro Cibao : Elisa Abreu (La Vega)
- Miss Region del Cibao Occidental : Yudith Morales (Puerto Plata)
- Miss Region del Cibao Oriental : Yamel Mora (María Trinidad Sánchez)
- Miss Region del Sur Occidente : Daniela Peguero (Peravia)
- Miss Region del Sur Oriente : Natasha Romero (Distrito Nacional)

== Delegates ==
Province, Community	Contestant	Age	Height	Hometown	Geographical Regions
Azua	Clara Ureña López	23	1.69 m (5 ft 6 1/2 in)	Santo Domingo	Sur Occidente
Baoruco	Ixayra Medina Rosa	20	1.80 m (5 ft 10 3/4 in)	Neiba	Sur Occidente
Com. Dom. Miami	Lorraine Peralta Quirós	18	1.70 m (5 ft 7 in)	South Miami	Exterior
Com. Dom. Nueva York	Kathyrine Vizcano Núñez	25	1.80 m (5 ft 10 3/4 in)	Brooklyn	Exterior
Com. Dom. Pennsylvania	Joanie Polanco Oviedo	20	1.73 m (5 ft 8 in)	Hazleton	Exterior
Com. Dom. Rhode Island	Marilin Tatís Arias	22	1.83 m (6 ft 0 in)	Provindence	Exterior
Distrito Nacional	Natasha Romero Sánchez	25	1.66 m (5 ft 5 1/4 in)	Santo Domingo	Sur Oriente
Duarte	Exilia Martínez Camacho	24	1.72 m (5 ft 7 3/4 in)	San Francisco de Macorís	Cibao Oriental
Espaillat	Laura Jiménez Ynoa	22	1.81 m (5 ft 11 1/4 in)	Santo Domingo	Centro Cibao
Hato Mayor	Karina Cid Mir	21	1.79 m (5 ft 10 1/2 in)	Santo Domingo	Sur Oriente
La Altagracia	Julisa Fernández Nolasco	18	1.83 m (6 ft 0 in)	Santiago de los Caballeros	Sur Oriente
La Romana	Anna Merán Portillo	23	1.68 m (5 ft 6 1/4 in)	La Romana	Sur Oriente
La Vega	Elisa Abreu de los Santos	19	1.75 m (5 ft 9 in)	Jarabacoa	Centro Cibao
María Trinidad Sánchez	Yamel del Carmen Mora Ventura	19	1.76 m (5 ft 9 1/4 in)	Río San Juan	Cibao Oriental
Monseñor Nouel	Lizaura Tejeda Fabían	20	1.74 m (5 ft 8 1/2 in)	Bonao	Centro Cibao
Monte Plata	Marta Reynoso Henríquez	21	1.73 m (5 ft 8 in)	Santo Domingo	Sur Oriente
Pedernales	Teresa Zamora Gómez	18	1.82 m (5 ft 11 3/4 in)	Santo Domingo	Sur Occidente
Peravia	Daniela Teresa Peguero Brito	23	1.74 m (5 ft 8 1/2 in)	Santo Domingo	Sur Occidente
Puerto Plata	Yudith Karina Morales Hernández	20	1.78 m (5 ft 10 in)	San Felipe de Puerto Plata	Cibao Occidental
Salcedo	Edith Germán Lora	24	1.75 m (5 ft 9 in)	Santiago de los Caballeros	Centro Cibao
Samaná	Elizabeth María Santana Corona	19	1.78 m (5 ft 10 in)	Santiago de los Caballeros	Cibao Oriental
Sánchez Ramírez	Alexandra Bautista Álvarez	22	1.72 m (5 ft 7 3/4 in)	Bonao	Cibao Oriental
San Cristóbal	Lucía de Lara Brito	21	1.85 m (6 ft 3/4 in)	San Cristóbal	Sur Occidente
San Juan	Sandra Cruz Ramírez	20	1.77 m (5 ft 9 3/4 in)	San Juan de la Maguana	Sur Occidente
San Pedro de Macorís	Ariany Abidaner de Sosa	21	1.79 m (5 ft 10 1/2 in)	San Pedro de Macorís	Sur Oriente
Santiago	Joselyn Taveras Cabrera	20	1.76 m (5 ft 9 1/4 in)	Santiago de los Caballeros	Cibao Occidental
Santiago Rodríguez	Stephanie Almadaor Torres	18	1.68 m (5 ft 6 1/4 in)	San Ignacio de Sabaneta	Cibao Occidental
Valverde	Elicia Collado Morittini	25	1.70 m (5 ft 7 in)	Santiago de los Caballeros	Cibao Occidental

== Trivia ==
- Joselyn Taveras, Miss Santiago entered Miss Dominican Republic 2004 and Reina Nacional de Belleza Miss República Dominicana 2005.
- Yudith Morales, Miss Puerto Plata entered Reina Nacional de Belleza Miss República Dominicana 2005.
- Yamel Mora, Miss María Trinidad Sánchez would enter Reina Nacional de Belleza Miss República Dominicana 2006.
- Daniela Peguero, Miss Peravia would enter Reina Nacional de Belleza Miss República Dominicana 2007.
- Natasha Romero, Miss Distrito Nacional entered Miss Dominican Republic 2005.
