= Reina Nacional de Belleza Miss República Dominicana 2005 =

- Date: February 2, 2004
- Venue: Barceló Bávaro Convention Center, Bávaro, Dominican Republic
- Broadcaster: Telemicro
- Entrants: 18
- Winner: Yadira Rossina Geara Cury; Espaillat

Reina Nacional de Belleza Miss República Dominicana 2005 was held on February 2, 2004. 18 candidates representing provinces and municipalities entered. The winner would represent the Dominican Republic at Miss International 2005. The first runner up represented the country in Miss Tourism Queen International 2005. The second runner up represented the country in Reina Nacional del Café. The rest of the finalists entered different pageants.

== Results ==
Final results	Contestant
RNB Miss República Dominicana 2005	Espaillat - Yadira Geara
1st Runner-up	Monte Cristi - Dallas Leclerc
2nd Runner-up	Puerto Plata - Yudith Morales
Semi-finalists	La Altagracia - Anylis Cañizares; Samaná - Dayana Pichardo; Santiago - Yoslyn Taveras; Distrito Nacional - Alexandra Nastcke; La Romana - Patrizia Gagg

=== Special awards ===
- Miss Photogenic (voted by press reporters) - Yudith Morales (Puerto Plata)
- Miss Congeniality (voted by Miss Dominican Republic contestants) - Sairy Ruiz (Com. Dom. NY)
- Best Provincial Costume - Esmeralda Paulino (Azua)

== Delegates ==
- Azua - Esmeralda Paulino
- Barahona - Melisa Rodríguez
- Com. Dom. Nueva York - Sairy Ruiz
- Com. Dom. Pto. Rico - Melba Hidalgo
- Distrito Nacional - Alexandra Nastcke
- Espaillat - Yadira Rossina Geara Cury
- La Altagracia - Anylis Cañizares Hernández
- La Romana - Patrizia Karina Gagg Jiménez
- La Vega - Yajhaira Duran
- Monseñor Nouel - Digna Llaverias
- Monte Cristi - Dallas Iluminada Leclerc Paulino
- Puerto Plata - Yudith Morales
- Samaná - Dayana Pichardo
- San Juan - Heisseell Valdez
- San Pedro de Macorís - Elvia Castillo
- Santiago - Yoslyn Taveras Cabrera
- Santiago Rodríguez - Nadia Ferreira
- Valverde - Yobanka Campos

== Trivia ==
- Yadira Geara, Anylis Cañizares and Yoslyn Taveras entered in Miss Dominican Republic Universe 2004.
- Patrizia Gagg entered in Miss Mundo Dominicana 2004
