= Reina Nacional de Belleza Miss República Dominicana 2006 =

- Date: October 17, 2005
- Venue: Palacios de los Deportes, Santo Domingo, Dominican Republic
- Broadcaster: Colorvision
- Entrants: 22
- Winner: Wilma Abreu Nazario; Monte Plata

The Reina Nacional de Belleza Miss República Dominicana 2006 pageant was held on October 17, 2005. Only 22 candidates competed for the national crown. The chosen winner represented the Dominican Republic at the Miss International 2006 pageant which was held in Tokyo. The first runner up represented the country in Miss Mesoamerica. The second runner up represented the country in Reina Nacional del Café. The third runner up represented the country in Miss Atlantico. The fourth runner up represented the country in Reina Mundial del Banano. The fifth runner up represented the country in Miss Tourism Queen International 2006. The rest of the finalists entered different pageants.

== Results ==
Final results	Contestant
RNB Miss República Dominicana 2006	Monte Plata - Wilma Abreu
1st Runner-up	Río San Juan - Yamel Mora
2nd Runner-up	Higüey - Pamela Cruz
3rd Runner-up	Santiago - Jennifer Peña
4th Runner-up	Monte Cristi - Hareld Mossle
5th Runner-up	Sánchez Ramírez - Erika Plasencia
Top 12	Puerto Plata - Ayssel Lara; Independencia - Karina Ynoa; La Vega - Claribel Rosales; San Cristóbal - Nathalie Gutiérrez; Villa González - Dahiana Grullón; San Francisco de Macorís - Cheryl Ortega

=== Special awards ===
- Miss Photogenic (voted by press reporters) - Yamel Mora (Río San Juan)
- Miss Congeniality (voted by contestants) - Evelyn Lora (Salcedo)
- Best Provincial Costume - Francia Aquino (Barahona)

== Delegates ==
Represented	Contestant	Age	Height	Hometown
Barahona	Francia María Aquino Abreu	17	5 ft 9 in 175 cm	Santo Domingo
Bonao	Gladys Margarita Sánchez Marte	20	5 ft 9 in 175 cm	Bonao
Com. Dom. Nueva York	Yamilka Massiel Santana Colón	19	5 ft 8 in 173 cm	The Bronx
Com. Dom. Pto. Rico	Maribel Tavarez Velásquez	25	5 ft 9 in 175 cm	Aguadilla
Distrito Nacional	Arianna Nathalies Segura Alcántara	17	5 ft 9 in 175 cm	Santo Domingo
Hato Mayor	Dheyriana Lorel Pimentel Rosa	19	5 ft 9 in 175 cm	Santo Domingo
Higüey	Pamela Lucía Cruz Ortíz	19	5 ft 11 in 180 cm	Salvaleón de Higüey
Independencia	Yahaira Karina Ynoa Vera	26	6 ft 1 in 185 cm	Santo Domingo
La Vega	Claribel Rosales Villaman	22	5 ft 8 in 173 cm	Concepción de la Vega
Moca	Loida Anesa Pichardo de la Cruz	19	5 ft 5 in 165 cm	Jamao al Norte
Monte Cristi	Hareld Ellien Mossle Casado	18	5 ft 8 in 173 cm	Santiago de los Caballeros
Monte Plata	Wilma Joana Abreu Nazario	20	5 ft 8 in 173 cm	Santiago de los Caballeros
Puerto Plata	Ayssel María Lara Burdíez	17	5 ft 8 in 173 cm	San Felipe de Puerto Plata
Río San Juan	Yamel del Carmen Mora Ventura	19	5 ft 8 in 173 cm	Río San Juan
Salcedo	Evelyn Lora Corniel	22	5 ft 8 in 173 cm	Villa Tapia
Sánchez Ramírez	Erika Altagracia Plasencia Lozada	22	5 ft 10 in 178 cm	Cotuí
San Cristóbal	Nathalie Venecia Gutiérrez Arias	21	6 ft 0 in 183 cm	San Gregorio de Nigua
San Francisco de Macorís	Cheryl Yesenia Ortega Vega	17	5 ft 9 in 175 cm	San Francisco de Macorís
San Juan	Candy Familia Placencia	20	6 ft 0 in 183 cm	Santo Domingo
Santiago	Jennifer Amaris Peña García	21	5 ft 11 in 180 cm	Santiago de los Caballeros
Santiago Rodríguez	Aliana Isabel Díaz Felipe	17	5 ft 8 in 173 cm	San Ignacio de Sabaneta
Villa González	Dahiana Emperatriz Grullón Almonte	20	5 ft 9 in 175 cm	Santiago de los Caballeros

== Trivia ==
- Pamela Cruz, Miss Higüey entered in Miss Dominican Republic 2005.
- Jennifer Peña, Miss Santiago would win Miss Miss República Dominicana USA 2007 and would enter in Miss Dominican Republic 2008.
- The winner Wilma abreu, Miss Monte Plata and Hareld Mossle, Miss Monte Cristi entered in Miss Mundo Dominicana 2004. Wilma was first runner up.
