= Miss Dominican Republic 2002 =

- Date: July 29, 2002
- Presenters: Mariasela Álvarez, Alexandra Malagón y Miguel Varoni
- Entertainment: Charytín Goico, Shalim, Alexandre Pires
- Venue: Teatro Nacional Eduardo Brito, Santo Domingo, Dominican Republic
- Broadcaster: Channel 13 Telecentro
- Entrants: 22
- Withdrawals: Dajabón, Hato Mayor, Neiba, San Cristóbal, San Juan, Santiago Rodríguez, Villa González
- Winner: Amelia Victoria Vega Polanco; Santiago

Miss República Dominicana 2003 was held on July 29, 2002. There were 22 candidates, representing provinces and municipalities, who entered. There was going to be 30 but there were various withdrawals. The winner would represent the Dominican Republic at Miss Universe 2003. The first runner-up would enter Miss International 2003.

The second runner-up would enter in Miss América Latina 2003. The rest of finalist entered different pageants. The winner of the pageant would go to win the crown of Miss Universe, that is the reason she didn't enter Miss Earth.

== Results ==
Final results	Contestant
Miss República Dominicana 2002	Santiago - Amelia Vega
1st Runner-up	Bonao - Jeimi Hernández
2nd Runner-up	Com. Dom. En Nueva York - Carol Arciniegas
Semi-finalists	La Romana - Suanny Frontaán; San José de Ocoa - Dalisa Alegría; Puerto Plata - Dina Encarnación; Valverde - Lourdes Medina; Duvergé - Ileana Avilés; San José de las Matas - Karina Germán; La Altagracia - Mary Fiallo; Licey al Medio - Ana Frometa; Santo Domingo Oeste - Aurora Sardéña

== Delegates ==
Represented	Contestant	Age	Height	Hometown
Azua	Patricia Tomas Ferro	21	1.78 m (5 ft 10 in)	Santo Domingo
Bonao	Jeimi Vanessa Hernández Franjul	24	1.81 m (5 ft 11 1/4 in)	Bonao
Comendador	Eva Duarte Sánchez	19	1.75 m (5 ft 9 in)	San Felipe de Puerto Plata
Com. Dom. En Nueva York	Carol María Arciniegas Jiménez	20	1.78 m (5 ft 10 in)	Washington Heights
Dajabón	Elizabeth Rondón García	18	1.75 m (5 ft 9 in)	Loma de Cabrera
Distrito Nacional	Melanie Pimentel de Lara	26	1.69 m (5 ft 6 1/2 in)	Los Alcarrizos
Duvergé	Ileana Avilés Terrero	22	1.85 m (6 ft 3/4 in)	Santo Domingo
El Seibo	Yorning Mateo Sâlves	18	1.68 m (5 ft 6 1/4 in)	Santo Domingo
Hato Mayor	Sarah María Reyes Santos	20	1.75 m (5 ft 9 in)	San Cristóbal
Jimaní	Ana María Beldaña Ferriera	23	1.70 m (5 ft 7 in)	Santiago de los Caballeros
La Altagracia	Mary Ann Fiallo Reynosa	21	1.73 m (5 ft 8 in)	Santo Domingo
La Romana	Suanny Frontaán de la Cruz	22	1.82 m (5 ft 11 3/4 in)	La Romana
La Vega	Norbelkis Ramírez Astro	18	1.77 m (5 ft 9 3/4 in)	Santiago de los Caballeros
Licey al Medio	Ana Carolina Frometa Cruz	22	1.77 m (5 ft 9 3/4 in)	Santiago de los Caballeros
María Trinidad Sánchez	Yoneidy Zamora Berro	20	1.81 m (5 ft 11 1/4 in)	Villa Mella
Moca	Cindy Arias Morton	25	1.80 m (5 ft 10 3/4 in)	Moca
Monte Cristi	Carolina Ayala Cromen	18	1.71 m (5 ft 7 1/4 in)	San Felipe de Puerto Plata
Neiba	Sandra Castellanos de Fermin**	21	1.76 m (5 ft 9 1/4 in)	Santo Domingo
Puerto Plata	Dina Margarita Encarnación del Rosario	23	1.83 m (6 ft 0 in)	Sosúa
Samaná	Lucrecia Vargas Camacho	20	1.74 m (5 ft 8 1/2 in)	Moca
San Cristóbal	Elisa Mercedes Cid Brito	19	1.74 m (5 ft 8 1/2 in)	San Cristóbal
San Francisco de Macorís	Johanna del Carmen Espaillat Romero	19	1.76 m (5 ft 9 1/4 in)	San Francisco de Macorís
San José de las Matas	Karina Germán Fernández	24	1.77 m (5 ft 9 3/4 in)	Santiago de los Caballeros
San Juan	Lizette de los Santos Petro	23	1.78 m (5 ft 10 in)	San Juan de la Maguana
San José de Ocoa	Dalisa Magdalena Alegría Gómez	19	1.67 m (5 ft 5 3/4 in)	San Pedro de Macorís
Santiago	Amelia Victoria Vega Polanco	17	1.85 m (6 ft 3/4 in)	Santiago de los Caballeros
Santiago Rodríguez	Martha Zamora Taveras**	20	1.83 m (6 ft 0 in)	Santiago de los Caballeros
Santo Domingo Este	Hendy Carmen Monegro de la Peña	20	1.71 m (5 ft 7 1/4 in)	Santo Domingo
Santo Domingo Oeste	Aurora Sardéña Fiallo	25	1.79 m (5 ft 10 1/2 in)	Santo Domingo
Valverde	Lourdes Medina Acosta	21	1.72 m (5 ft 7 3/4 in)	Laguna Salada
Villa González	Linette Seferino Guzmán	19	1.81 m (5 ft 11 1/4 in)	Santiago de los Caballeros

== Withdrawals ==
- Miss Neiba and Miss Santiago Rodriguez both withdrew after having had an accident before the photoshoot. They had to wear 9 inch high heels due to a reward challenge they had on the first day. Miss Neiba twisted her ankle and Miss Santiago Rodriquez twisted her kneecap. They were both in the auditorium 2 months later, the evening of the coronation.
- Miss Dajabón, Miss Hato Mayor, Miss San Cristóbal, Miss San Juan, Miss Villa Bisonó and Miss Villa González entered the pageant, but withdrew weeks before the finale.
