= Miss Mundo Dominicana 2004 =

- Date: October 10, 2004
- Venue: Renaissance Auditorio de Festival del Hotel Jaragua, Santo Domingo, Dominican Republic
- Broadcaster: Telemicro Canal 5
- Entrants: 20
- Debuts: Com. Dom. En California
- Winner: Claudia Julissa Cruz Rodríguez; Monseñor Nouel

The Miss Mundo Dominicana 2004 pageant was held on October 10, 2004. That year, only 20 candidates competed for the national crown. The chosen winner, Claudia Cruz, represented the Dominican Republic at the Miss World 2004. The delegates used their introduction dresses to introduce themselves. After that, they each showcased their provincial costumes, participated in the swimsuit segment and modeled evening gowns. The judges averaged the points and selected a delegate who performed best from their region, awarding them a sash representing their region. The Top 6 candidates were then questioned. Three candidates who answered exceptionally well received votes from the audience and the judges combined, determining the winner based on the highest vote. The winner would go on to Miss World and become the First Runner Up. In this edition, there were three candidates for each Dominican Regions.

== Results ==
Final results	Contestant
Miss Mundo Dominicana 2004	Monseñor Nouel - Claudia Cruz
1st Runner-up	Puerto Plata - Wilma Abreu
2nd Runner-up	Samaná - Genevet Gutiérrez
Top 6	Com. Dom. En California - Mónica Angulo; Santo Domingo - Natascha Forestieri; Barahona - Desireé Álvarez

=== Special awards ===
- Miss Congeniality (voted by contestants) - Yohanna Torres (Valverde)
- Best Provincial Costume - Julissa Alcantara (Azua)
- Miss Elegancia - Genevet Gutiérrez (Samaná)

=== Final Competition Scores ===
Represents	Gown	Swimsuit	Average	Q&A	Votes
Monseñor Nouel	9.041	9.047	9.044	9.5	66.87%
Puerto Plata	8.941	9.341	9.141	9.7	18.74%
Samaná	9.102	9.011	9.057	9.8	14.39%
Com. Dom. En California	9.257	9.641	9.449	9.2	
San Pedro de Macorís	9.214	8.756	8.985	8.9	
Barahona	9.454	9.841	9.648	8.5	
Santiago	9.089	9.108	9.099		
María Trinidad Sónchez	9.051	9.058	9.055		
Com. Dom. En Miami	9.004	9.086	9.045		
Distrito Nacional	8.745	9.082	8.914		
La Vega	8.699	8.784	8.742		
Monte Cristi	8.791	8.681	8.736		
Salcedo	8.541	8.571	8.556		
La Altagracia	8.861	8.049	8.455		
Valverde	8.297	8.491	8.394		
Independencia	8.145	8.046	8.096		
La Romana	7.945	8.014	7.980		
Duarte	7.597	7.980	7.789		
Com. Dom. En Nueva York	7.415	7.542	7.479		
Azua	7.084	7.284	7.184		

Winner
First runner-up
Second runner-up
Top 6
Remainders

== Miss Dominican Regions ==
- Miss Communidad Dominicana en el Exterior : Mónica Angulo (Com. Dom. California)
- Miss Region del Centro Cibao : Claudia Cruz (Monseñor Nouel)
- Miss Region del Cibao Occidental : Wilma Abreu (Puerto Plata)
- Miss Region del Cibao Oriental : Genevet Gutiérrez (Samaná)
- Miss Region del Sur Occidente : Desireé Álvarez (Barahona)
- Miss Region del Sur Oriente : Natascha Forestieri (Santo Domingo)

== Delegates ==
Province, Community	Contestant	Age	Height	Hometown	Geographical Regions
Azua	Julissa Alcantara de Fiallo	22	1.75 m (5 ft 9 in)	Santo Domingo	Sur Occidente
Barahona	Desireé Álvarez Lama	19	1.77 m (5 ft 9 3/4 in)	Santa Cruz de Barahona	Sur Occidente
Com. Dom. En California	Mónica Angulo Pucheaux	18	1.76 m (5 ft 9 1/4 in)	Los Angeles	Exterior
Com. Dom. En Miami	Onidys Reynosa Espinal	21	1.73 m (5 ft 8 in)	Miami	Exterior
Com. Dom. En Nueva York	Joslyn Cabrera Ruiz	18	1.81 m (5 ft 11 1/4 in)	New York	Exterior
Distrito Nacional	Katherine Germania Almos Rey	24	1.79 m (5 ft 10 1/2 in)	Villa Juana	Sur Oriente
Duarte	Lissette Abreu Ynoa	22	1.71 m (5 ft 7 1/4 in)	Constanza	Cibao Oriental
Independencia	Nathalie Venecia Gutiérrez Arias	20	1.82 m (5 ft 11 3/4 in)	Santo Domingo	Sur Occidente
La Altagracia	Patrizia Karina Gagg Jiménez	20	1.81 m (5 ft 11 1/4 in)	Villa Hermosa	Sur Oriente
La Romana	Anna Karina Toledo Espinoza	22	1.68 m (5 ft 6 1/4 in)	La Romana	Sur Oriente
La Vega	Cindy Magdalena Torrealba Cruz	17	1.79 m (5 ft 10 1/2 in)	Jarabacoa	Cibao Central
María Trinidad Sánchez	Massiel Javier Cañizarez	19	1.80 m (5 ft 10 3/4 in)	Cabrera	Cibao Oriental
Monseñor Nouel	Claudia Julissa Cruz Rodríguez	18	1.75 m (5 ft 9 in)	Bonao	Cibao Central
Monte Cristi	Hareld Ellien Mossle Casado	17	1.70 m (5 ft 7 in)	Santiago de los Caballeros	Cibao Occidental
Puerto Plata	Wilma Joana Abreu Nazario	20	1.69 m (5 ft 6 1/2 in)	Santiago de los Caballeros	Cibao Occidental
Salcedo	Josefina de Arias Camacho	24	1.66 m (5 ft 5 1/4 in)	Santo Domingo	Cibao Central
Samaná	Genevet Nicol Gutiérrez Kourie	18	1.72 m (5 ft 7 3/4 in)	Santa Bárbara de Samaná	Cibao Oriental
San Pedro de Macorís	Natascha Forestieri de los Santos	23	1.83 m (6 ft 0 in)	San Pedro de Macorís	Sur Oriente
Santiago	Cindy Guerrero Reynoso	26	1.78 m (5 ft 10 in)	Santiago de los Caballeros	Cibao Occidental
Valverde	Yohanna Torres Ramos	16	1.81 m (5 ft 11 1/4 in)	Santo Domingo	Cibao Occidental

== Trivia ==
- Desireé Álvarez, Miss Barahona would enter in Miss Dominican Republic 2007 and was a semifinalist.
- Genevet Gutiérrez, Miss Samaná would enter Miss Dominican Republic 2005 and become a 2nd Runner Up.
- Wilma Abreu, Miss Puerto Plata would enter Reina Nacional de Belleza Miss República Dominicana 2006 and become the winner.
- Hareld Mossle, Miss Monte Cristi would entered in Reina Nacional de Belleza Miss República Dominicana 2006.
- Claudia Cruz, Miss Monseñor Nouel, the winner was 4th Runner Up at Miss Dominican Republic 2004.
- Massiel Javier, Miss María Trinidad Sánche would enter Miss Dominican Republic 2005
- Miss Dominican Republic Organization would send Mónica Angulo to debut the country at Reina Sudamericana 2006.
- Patrizia Gagg, Miss La Altagracia would entered in Reina Nacional de Belleza Miss República Dominicana 2005.
