= Miss Dominican Republic 2004 =

Beauty pageant held in the Dominican Republic in 2004

- Date: April 3, 2004
- Presenters: Georgina Duluc and José Guillermo Cortines
- Entertainment: Don Omar, Shalim Ortiz, Víctor Manuelle
- Venue: Palacios de los Deportes, Santo Domingo, Dominican Republic
- Broadcaster: Color Vision
- Entrants: 34
- Winner: Larissa del Mar Fiallo Scanlón Cabrera; La Vega

The Miss República Dominicana 2004 was held on April 3, 2004. That year 34 candidates competed for the national crown. The chosen winner represented the Dominican Republic at the Miss Universe 2004 pageant which was held in Santo Dominigo, Republica Dominicana. 16 Provinces, 16 Municipalities and 2 Dominican Communities had entered.

== Results ==
Final results	Contestant
Miss República Dominicana 2004	La Vega - Larimar Fiallo
1st Runner-up	San Cristóbal - Isaura Taveras
2nd Runner-up	Santiago - Pamela Sued
3rd Runner-up	Distrito Nacional - Yadira Geara
4th Runner-up	Hato Mayor - Dawilda González
5th Runner-up	Bonao - Claudia Cruz
Semi-finalists	San Pedro de Macorís - Annabel Martínez; Samaná - Carolyne Aquino; Valverde Mao - Yenny Gómez; Santo Domingo Este - Anaylis Hernández; San Francisco de Macorís - Johabel Paulino; San Juan - Colombia Alcántara

| Miss Photogenic*Santiago - Julissa Ramos

== Delegates ==
Represented	Contestant	Age	Height	Hometown
Azua	Angie Agramonte Mora	24	1.75 m (5 ft 9 in)	Santiago de los Caballeros
Bonao	Claudia Julissa Cruz Rodríguez	18	1.77 m (5 ft 9 3/4 in)	Bonao
Com. Dom. en Nueva York	Sandra Femin Rosal	19	1.73 m (5 ft 8 in)	The Bronx
Com. Dom. en Puerto Rico	Carolin Martínez Guerrero	20	1.80 m (5 ft 10 3/4 in)	Guaynabo
Distrito Nacional	Yadira Rossina Geara Cury	18	1.84 m (6 ft 1/2 in)	Santo Domingo
Duvergé	Lizfanny Emilia Emiliano Vásquez	20	1.74 m (5 ft 8 1/2 in)	Duvergé
Guaymate	Georgina Solano Polanco	23	1.68 m (5 ft 6 1/4 in)	La Romana
Hato Mayor	Dawilda González Cid	19	1.81 m (5 ft 11 1/4 in)	Santo Domingo
Jarabacoa	Risory Merán Castro	22	1.76 m (5 ft 9 1/4 in)	Jarabacoa
La Romana	Patricia Soriano Cabrera	24	1.70 m (5 ft 7 in)	La Romana
La Vega	Larissa del Mar Fiallo Scanlón	20	1.85 m (6 ft 3/4 in)	Concepción de La Vega
Moca	Diana Rodríguez Vargas	22	1.82 m (5 ft 11 3/4 in)	Moca
Monte Cristi	María Onfalia Morillo Lozada	19	1.77 m (5 ft 9 3/4 in)	San Felipe de Puerto Plata
Monte Plata	Jane Matos Mateo	20	1.69 m (5 ft 6 1/2 in)	Santo Domingo
Nagua	Susan González Victorio	21	1.71 m (5 ft 7 1/4 in)	Santo Domingo
Puerto Plata	Mayra Cristina Cueto Tejeda	18	1.81 m (5 ft 11 1/4 in)	San Felipe de Puerto Plata
Salcedo	Julissa Ramos	18	1.80 m (5 ft 10 3/4 in)	Salcedo
Samaná	Carolyne Aquino Benscome	18	1.79 m (5 ft 10 1/2 in)	Santo Domingo
San Cristóbal	Rita Isaura Taveras Henríquez	22	1.79 m (5 ft 10 1/2 in)	Santiago de los Caballeros
San Francisco de Macorís	Johabel Paulino Alvarado	26	1.76 m (5 ft 9 1/4 in)	San Francisco de Macorís
San José de las Matas	Marjorie Padrón Lara	21	1.78 m (5 ft 10 in)	Santiago de los Caballeros
San Juan	Colombia Alcántara Tatís	20	1.77 m (5 ft 9 3/4 in)	El Cercado
San Pedro de Macorís	Anna Mabelle Martínez Sosa	18	1.80 m (5 ft 10 3/4 in)	San Pedro de Macorís
Santiago	Pamela Sued Chávez	19	1.77 m (5 ft 9 3/4 in)	Santiago de los Caballeros
Santiago Rodríguez	Keyla Marcelino Medrano	23	1.82 m (5 ft 11 3/4 in)	Villa de los Almácigos
Santo Domingo Este	Anaylis Cañizares Hernández	18	1.74 m (5 ft 8 1/2 in)	Santiago de los Caballeros
Santo Domingo Norte	Kenia Polanco Vera	25	1.67 m (5 ft 5 3/4 in)	Santo Domingo
Santo Domingo Oeste	Massiel Peña Pérez	23	1.76 m (5 ft 9 1/4 in)	Santo Domingo
Sosúa	Yinette Vallejo Medina	24	1.65 m (5 ft 5 in)	San Felipe de Puerto Plata
Tamboril	Gabriela Estrella Valle	20	1.71 m (5 ft 7 1/4 in)	Santiago de los Caballeros
Valverde Mao	Yenny Franchesca Gómez Peralta	21	1.77 m (5 ft 9 3/4 in)	Santa Cruz de Mao
Villa Altagracia	Dairi Johanna Fortuna Mota	21	1.66 m (5 ft 5 1/4 in)	Santo Domingo
Villa Bisonó	Joselyn Taveras Cabrera	19	1.76 m (5 ft 9 1/4 in)	Santiago de los Caballeros
Villa González	Rosmery Peña Herrera	18	1.80 m (5 ft 10 3/4 in)	Santiago de los Caballeros
