= Ramon Henderson =

Dominican Republic baseball player (born 1963)

- Infielder / Coach
- Born: August 13, 1963 (age 62); Monción, Dominican Republic
- Bats: Right Throws: Right
- Stats at Baseball Reference

Ramon Gaspar Henderson (born August 18, 1963) is a Dominican former bullpen coach for the Philadelphia Phillies of Major League Baseball (MLB) from 1998 to 2008. In 2008, he was given a coaching position with the Rookie-level Clearwater Phillies. At the end of 2009, he was released from the Phillies organization. However, in November 2012, he was rehired as a coach for the GCL Phillies. Henderson also played minor league baseball as an infielder in the Phillies organization from 1982 until 1989.

Ramon has become best known for his role in the 2005 and 2006 MLB All-Star Games, where he pitched to the Home Run Derby champions both years (Phillies outfielder Bobby Abreu and Phillies first baseman Ryan Howard, respectively). His performance in the 2005 Derby led to the well-publicized requests of Boston Red Sox designated hitter David Ortiz and Baltimore Orioles shortstop Miguel Tejada to have Henderson pitch to them in the 2006 Derby.
