= San Juan Province =

San Juan Province may refer to:

- San Juan Province, Argentina
- San Juan Province (Dominican Republic)
