= Claudia Cruz =

Dominican Republic model (born 1986)

- Born: Claudia Julissa Cruz Rodríguez; February 5, 1986 (age 40); Bonao, Dominican Republic
- Height: 5 ft 9 in (1.75 m)
- Beauty pageant titleholder
- Title: Miss Mundo Dominicana 2004; Miss World Caribbean 2004
- Hair color: Black
- Eye color: Brown
- Major competitions: Miss Dominican Republic 2004 (5th Runner-Up); Miss Mundo Dominicana 2004 (Winner); Miss World 2004 (1st Runner-Up)

Claudia Julissa Cruz Rodríguez (born February 5, 1986, in Bonao) is a Dominican actress, tv host, model and beauty pageant titleholder who represented her country at the Miss World 2004 pageant.

After representing Bonao and placing only as the fifth runner-up in the Miss Dominican Republic 2004 pageant, which was won by Larimar Fiallo, Cruz decided to take another chance at the new revamped and independent Miss Mundo Dominicana contest. For the first time ever the contest would be a reality show, the semifinalists being narrowed down by judges and the finalists and winners based on public vote. Having received 66% of the votes, Claudia was named winner on October 10, 2004, only a month before departure to the contest. Despite the lack of time to prepare herself for the Miss World pageant, she won the title of Continental Queen of the Caribbean and finished as the first runner-up to the eventual winner, María Julia Mantilla from Peru.

Cruz is the first Dominican beauty queen to have been elected by public vote. She is also the second-highest placed Dominican ever in the Miss World contest as she placed second, only Mariasela Álvarez has placed higher as she was the winner of Miss World 1982.

Cruz crowned her successor Elisa Abreu, on July 10, 2005.

Claudia has a sister, sports reporter Carolina Cruz de Martínez, who is married to the famous Dominican pitcher Pedro Martínez.

Claudia converted to Islam in early 2010's. She is married with Arab-American entrepreneur Faton Nour, and have 2 Children Together and they still live in New York.

She has founded her own cosmetics brand for Arab women, and dedicates herself to giving makeup tutorials to Muslim women and has appeared in Vogue Arabia.

Preceded by María Eugenia Vargas	Miss Mundo Dominicana; 2004	Succeeded by Elisa Abreu
Preceded by Jade Fulford	Miss World Caribbean; 2004	Succeeded by Ingrid Marie Rivera
Preceded by (Canada) Nazanin Afshin-Jam	1st Runner-up Miss World; 2004	Succeeded by (Mexico) Dafne Molina
