= Vallejuelo =

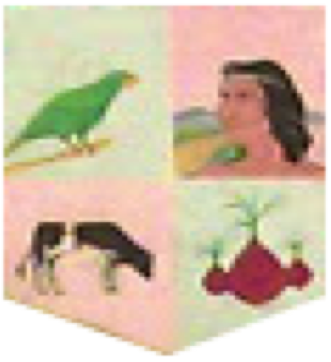
- Coat of arms

- Vallejuelo in the Dominican Republic
- Coordinates: 18°39′00″N 71°19′48″W
- Country: Dominican Republic
- Province: San Juan

Area
  - Total: 218.82 km^{2} (84.49 sq mi)

Population (2012)
  - Total: 12,555
  - Density: 57.376/km^{2} (148.60/sq mi)
- Municipal Districts: 1

Vallejuelo is a town in the San Juan province of the Dominican Republic.

== History ==
The first settlers resided in Rio Arriba of the south in 1880. These people had come from the Cibao region. Then, in 1912, several families of Hondo Valle and El Cercado settled in Vallejuelo and adjacent areas.

== Sources ==
- – World-Gazetteer.com
