= Arroyo Salado =

- Location within the Dominican Republic
- Coordinates: 19°30′13″N 69°54′52″W
- Country: Dominican Republic
- Province: María Trinidad Sánchez

Population (2008)
  - Total: 2,080
- Time zone: AST

Arroyo Salado is a 5km long beach and river in María Trinidad Sánchez Province of the Dominican Republic. It is very close to the town of Cabrera, and a short distance from Nagua.

It is a non-tourist location known to many Dominicans. The expansive Caribbean beach and river entrance make it a popular weekend spot.

There are several huts selling a variety of local food and beverages.

== Sources ==
- World Gazeteer: Dominican Republic – World-Gazetteer.com
