= Matayaya =

- Location within the Dominican Republic
- Coordinates: 18°53′24″N 71°35′24″W
- Country: Dominican Republic
- Province: San Juan

Population (2008)
  - Total: 1 003

Matayaya is a town in the San Juan province of the Dominican Republic.

== Sources ==
- – World-Gazetteer.com
