= Scottish Bay =

Coordinates: 19°19′N 69°40′W

Scottish Bay (Spanish: Bahía Escocesa) is a large bay in the Dominican Republic, stretching 70 kilometres across the northeast coast from Cabrera to Cabo Cabrón. The coast of the bay is entirely within two provinces, María Trinidad Sánchez in the west, and Samaná in the south.

== Citations ==
"First is that Columbus calls the said bay "very large." But what Columbus is referring to the Scottish Bay, which he saw on January 11 before arriving at Cabo Cabrón, he calls it "great," implying that the bay under consideration is larger than the Scottish"

"From Cape Cabron stole the coast to the S. and forms a large cove called Scotch Bay: the coasts of this cove are low and very dirty, so, and there being no population or any establishment in them, there is no reason that calls to ¿boats, that will have to look for directly from Cape Cabron"

"...on the coast of the Bahia Escocesa, likewise known as the Bay of Cosbeck, the latter probably a corruption of Scot's Bay."

"Samana Bay lies at the east end of the Island, between Capes Samana and Raphael, the former point being the extremity of an Island of the same name, facing the north side of the Bay and divided from the Hispaniola by a narrow creek; Samana Bay is sixty miles in length, and about ten wide. The Island of Samana separates this Bay from Scots Bay, a large triangular harbour to the north" Encyclopædia Metropolitana; Universal Dictionary Of Knowledge. Fourth Edition

"A Spaniard wrote from S. Domingo in 1635 to complain of an English buccaneer settlement at Samana (on the north coast of Hispaniola, near the Mona Passage), where they grew tobacco, and preyed on the ships sailing from Cartagena and S. Domingo for Spain. Possibly referring to Scottish Bay?"

"This was Scotchman's Bay - the Bahia de Escocesa, as the Spanish charts had it. To the westward lay a shelving beach; the big rollers here broke far out and ran in creamy white up to the water's edge with diminishing force, but to the eastward the shore line rose in a line of tree-covered hills standing bluffy with their feet in blue water; the rollers burst against them in sheets of spray that climbed far up the cliffs before falling back in a smother of white. for thirty miles those hills ran beside the sea, almost due east and west; they constituted the Samana peninsula, terminating in Samana Point. According to the charts the peninsula was no more than ten miles wide, behind them, round Samana Point, lay Samana Bay, opening into the Mona Passage and a most convenient anchorage for privateers and small ships of war which could lie there, under the protection of the fort of the Samana peninsula, ready to slip out and harass the West Indian convoys making use of the Mona Passage" Lieutenant Hornblower by C.S. Forester
