= Antonio Cruz Torres =

Dominican businessman (born 1957)

The Most Excellent Antonio Cruz Torres

Senator of the Dominican Republic for the Province of Santiago Rodríguez
- Incumbent
- Assumed office 16 August 2006
- Preceded by: Celeste Gómez (PRD)

Personal details
- Born: 30 October 1957 (age 68) Palmarejo, Santiago Rodríguez Province (Dominican Republic)
- Party: Dominican Liberation’s Party
- Spouse: Andrea Margarita Martínez
- Children: Anthony, Randy, Iberia & Ehimer
- Parent(s): Feliciano Cruz, Ana Luisa Torres
- Committees: President – "Committee of Contracts"
- Ethnicity: White Dominican
- Net worth: ▲RD$ 634.75 million (US$ 10.5 million)

Antonio de Jesús Cruz Torres (born 30 October 1957) is a businessman and politician from the Dominican Republic. He is Senator for the province of Santiago Rodríguez, elected in 2006, and re-elected in 2010.
