= El Factor =

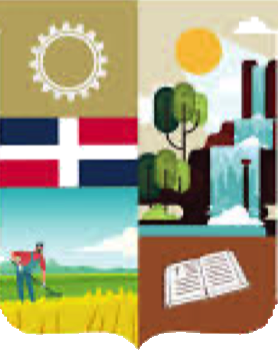
- Coat of arms

- Location within the Dominican Republic
- Coordinates: 19°19′12″N 69°52′48″W
- Country: Dominican Republic
- Province: María Trinidad Sánchez

Area
  - Total: 149.23 km^{2} (57.62 sq mi)

Population (2012)
  - Total: 20,148
  - Density: 135.01/km^{2} (349.68/sq mi)
  - Urban: 10,072
- Municipal Districts: 1

El Factor is a town in the María Trinidad Sánchez province of the Dominican Republic, hometown of Leopoldo Minaya, an acclaimed Latin American poet.

== Sources ==
- World Gazeteer: Dominican Republic – World-Gazetteer.com
