= Villa Los Almácigos =

- Villa Los Almácigos in the Dominican Republic
- Coordinates: 19°24′30″N 71°26′30″W
- Country: Dominican Republic
- Province: Santiago Rodríguez

Area
  - Total: 205.06 km^{2} (79.17 sq mi)

Population (2012)
  - Total: 26,613
  - Density: 129.78/km^{2} (336.13/sq mi)
- Distance to – Sabaneta: 11 km
- Municipal Districts: 0

Los Almacigos is a town in the province of Santiago Rodríguez in the Dominican Republic, in the west of the country between the Cordillera Central mountain range and the Inaje River area.

== Population ==
Los Almacigos has a population of 16,613.

== Local areas ==
One of the main attractions is the park of Olegaria Rodriguez, the first citizen of the town. The main tourist attractions in the area are the mountains and rivers of the Cordillera Central.

A few kilometers to the south of Villa Los Almacigos is La Peonia, home of the Hispaniolan solenodon and the Hispaniolan hutia, endangered animals endemic to the Dominican Republic. These animals usually live in brushy areas and in and around the coffee plantations. Next to La Peonia is the Nalga de Maco National Park.
