= Monción =

- Monción
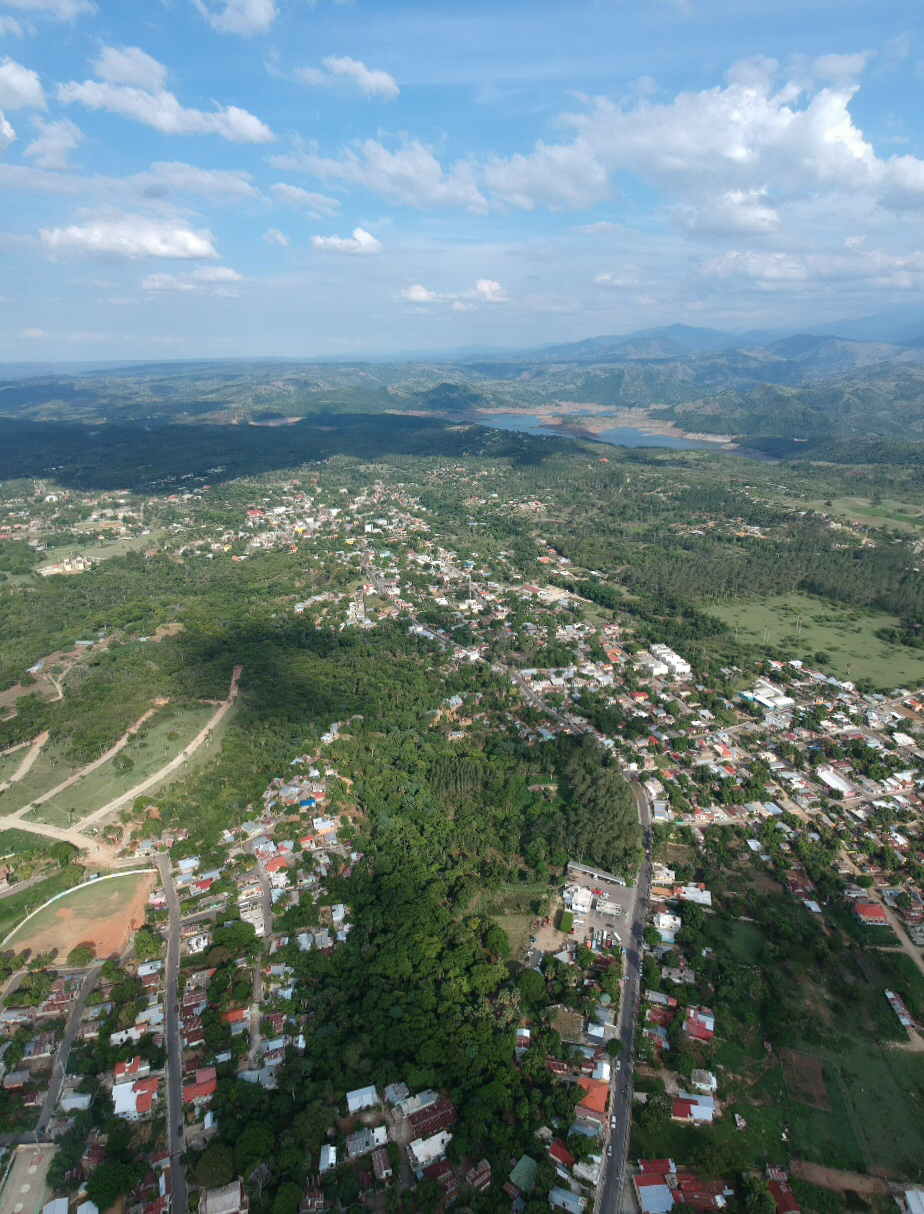

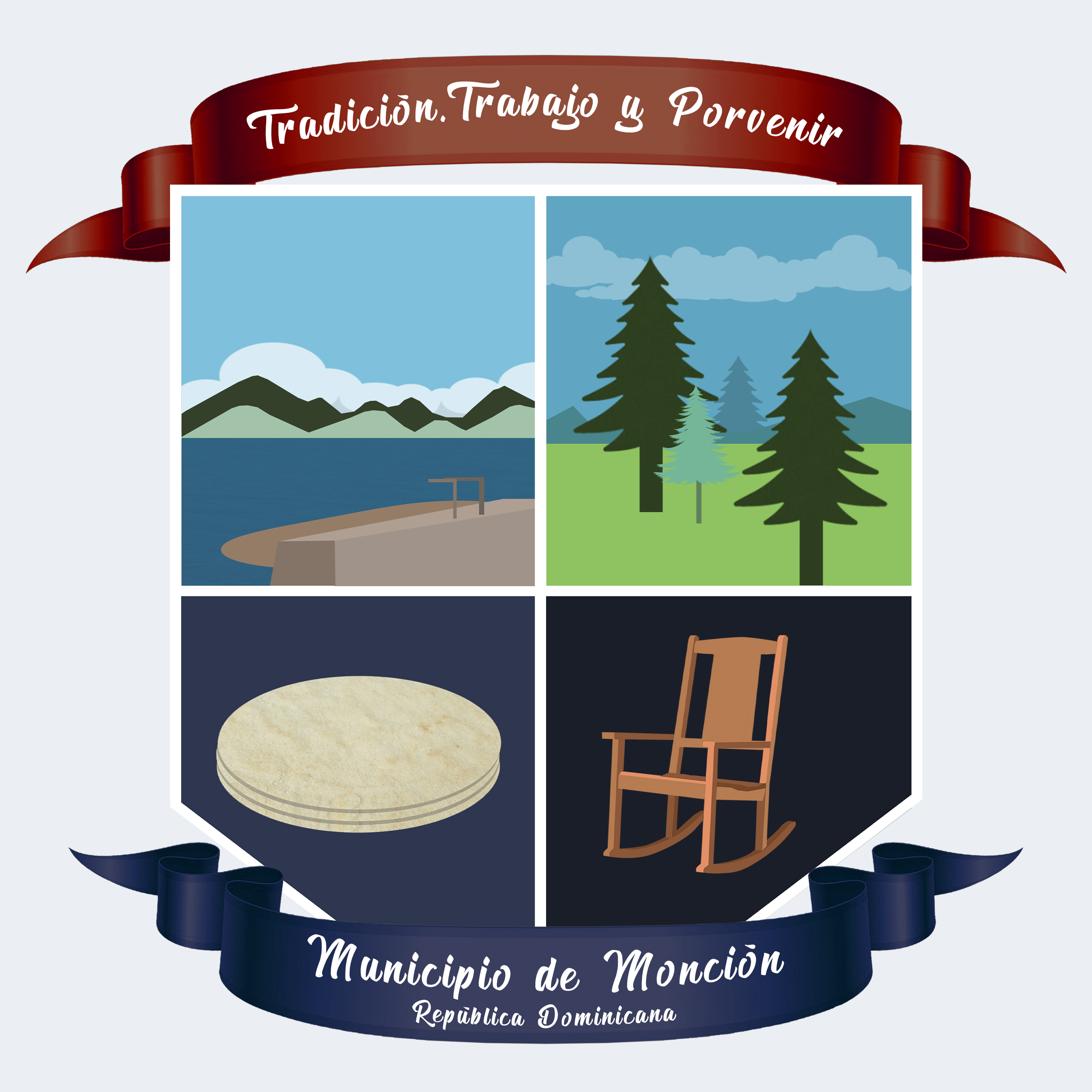
- Coat of arms

- Monción in the Dominican Republic
- Coordinates: 19°26′N 71°10′W
- Country: Dominican Republic
- Province: Santiago Rodríguez
- Established: September 9, 1907

Area
  - Total: 101.61 km^{2} (39.23 sq mi)
- Elevation: 364 m (1,194 ft)

Population (2010)
  - Total: 11,753
  - Density: 115.67/km^{2} (299.58/sq mi)
  - Demonym: Moncionero(a)
- Distance to – Sabaneta: 36 km
- Municipal Districts: 0

Monción is one of the 3 municipalities of the province in Santiago Rodriguez, Dominican Republic.

Previously it was called Guaraguanó, a name from the Taíno, but in 1898, the President of the Republic at that time, Ulises Heureaux, assigned the name of Monción, in honor of the hero of the Dominican Restoration War, General Benito Monción. In 1907, Monción became the official municipality of the Monte Cristi Province. Then in 1948, when the Province of Santiago Rodríguez was created, it became its municipality. It is located specifically in the southwest part of the province.

Its main economic source is the production of Cassava. This municipality is the largest producer of Cassava in the country and is known as the capital of Cassava.

== Limits ==
South: Cordillera Central, Dominican Republic

North: Mao, Dominican Republic

East: San José de las Matas

West: Sabaneta, Dominican Republic

== Climate ==
Monción has a tropical savanna climate (Köppen climate classification: Aw) with a dry season on winter and a pronounced wet season on summer.

== Municipal districts ==
- Gurabo
- Cepillo
- Gurabito
- Cañada Grande
- Meseta
- Barrio Nuevo
- Mata del Dajao
- Jicomé
- Cacique
- Los Pinos
- Mamoncito
- Veladero
- Bulla
- Clavijo
- Durán
- El Rodeo
- Loma del Tanque

== Geography ==
Charcos de los Indios near Monción

=== Relief ===
The municipality of Monción is located at the foot of the Cordillera Central (Hispaniola), surrounded by mountainous areas and beautiful natural landscapes that embellish the environment.

To the south of the municipality is the José Armando Bermúdez National Park, the most important forest reserve in the region. To the east is the Piky Lora National Park.

=== Hydrology ===
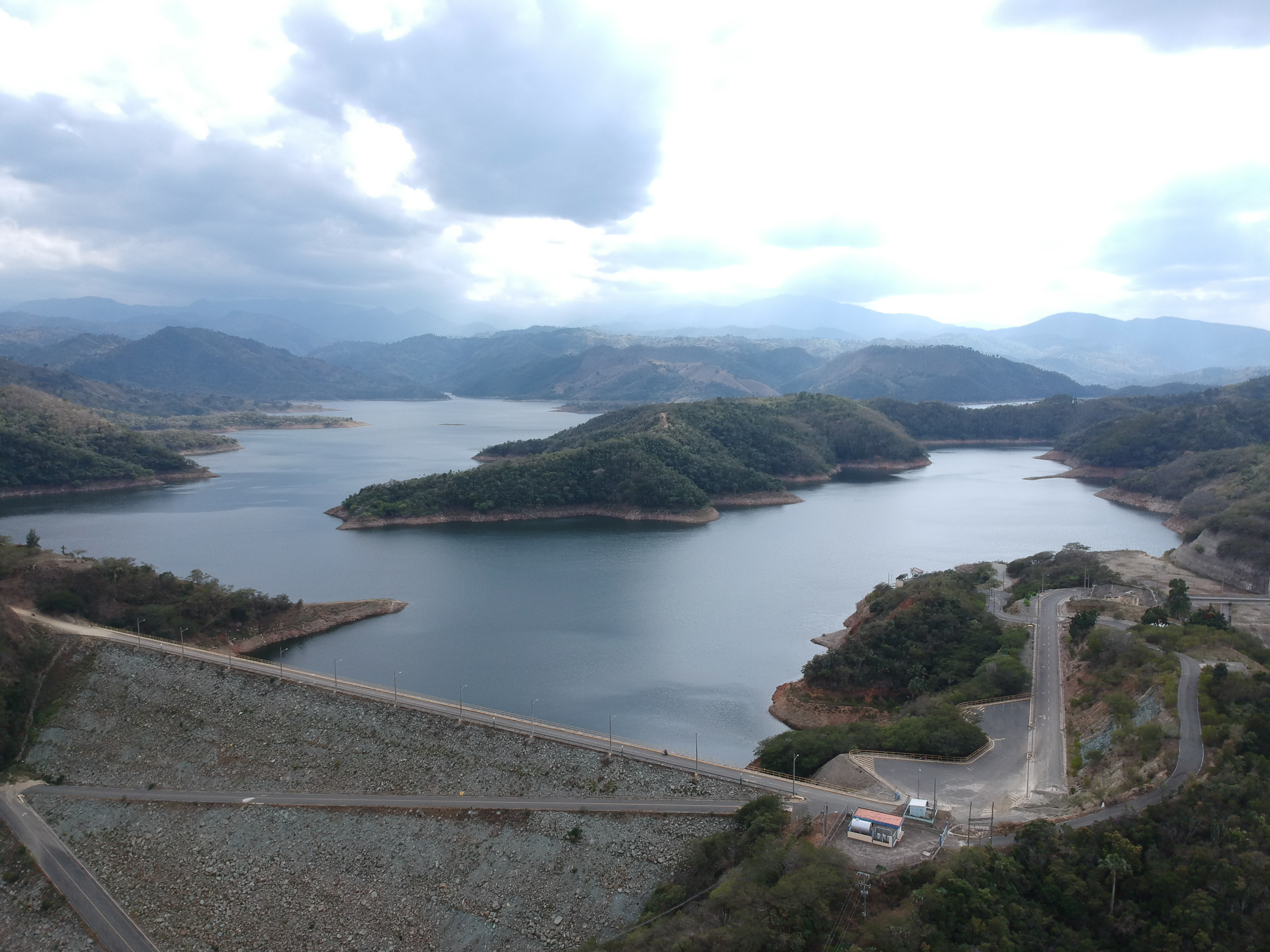
Monción Dam, inaugurated in 2001

The main river that crosses Monción is the Rio Mao, which flows into the Monción Dam in the southern part of the municipality.

==== Monción Dam ====
It was inaugurated on September 22, 2001 by President Hipólito Mejía. It is the highest dam in the Dominican Republic.

In 2003, won the El Puente Alcántara International Prize.

The purposes of this are the production of electrical energy, consumption of drinking water, tourism and services for agricultural production in the region.

== Demography ==
For the year 2010, the population was 11,753 inhabitants.

== Economy ==
The main source of economic is the production and export of Cassava. It has more than 50 factories for this product, which makes it the main economic activity. Also the manufacture of Cabinetmaking products and international remittances, due to the large number of moncioneros residing in the United States.

In this municipality is the main office of the Cooperativa Mamoncito, one of the main savings and credit cooperatives in the country, founded on April 2, 1978 and which has more than 8 offices nationwide.

== Art and culture ==
=== Festivities ===
Since 1912, the patronal feasts in honor of San Antonio de Padua in June.

In 1913, the Dominican musician Ñico Lora composed the merengue San Antonio, in honor of Anthony of Padua and the moncionero people. Since then, it has been declared as the anthem of this municipality. The festivities begin with the celebration of Holy Mass in the church and then live music where the main orchestras of the country and also local musicians and talents participate.

June 13 is for municipal rejoicing and a large part of the population gathers in the central park to celebrate this important day in the municipality.

Festivities

Since 1912, the patron saint festivities in honor of San Antonio de Padua have been held in June.

In 1913, the Dominican musician Ñico Lora composed the merengue San Antonio, in honor of San Antonio de Padua and the moncionero people. Since then, it has been declared as the anthem of this municipality. The festivities begin with the celebration of Holy Mass in the Parish and then live music where the main orchestras of the country and also local musicians and talents participate.

On June 12 there is a parade from the community of Cepillo to the municipal park.

June 13 is for municipal rejoicing and a large part of the population gathers in the central park to celebrate this important day in the municipality.

=== Carnival ===
For the beginning of March, the moncionero carnival celebration takes place for three days.

=== Field day ===
In September, the field day is held at the Minor Seminary of Our Lady of Mercedes, owned by the Catholic Church, where hundreds of people gather for the celebration of Mercedes Day.

== Tourism ==
The main tourist attraction is the Monción Dam, in the southern part of the Municipality.

== Education ==
=== Schools ===
- Juan Pablo Duarte High School
- La Trinitaria School
- Professor Juan Bosch School
- Anastacio Valle School
- San Antonio Labor School
- Juan Francisco Lora Music School
- Cañada Grande School
- Yisel Arias Secondary School
- La Meseta School
- English by immersion

== Health centers ==
- Monción Municipal Hospital
- Dr. Morel Clinic
- Dental health
