= Juan de Herrera, Dominican Republic =

Coordinates: 18°52′N 71°14′W

Juan de Herrera
- Interactive map of Juan de Herrera
- Country: Dominican Republic
- Province: San Juan

Area
  - Total: 146.85 km^{2} (56.70 sq mi)

Population (2012)
  - Total: 12,963
  - Density: 88.274/km^{2} (228.63/sq mi)

Juan de Herrera is a municipality and town in the San Juan province of the Dominican Republic.

== Sources ==
- "World Gazeteer: Dominican Republic". – World-Gazetteer.com
