= Amelia Vega =

Dominican model, actress, singer, author and beauty queen

Amelia Patricia Vega Polanco
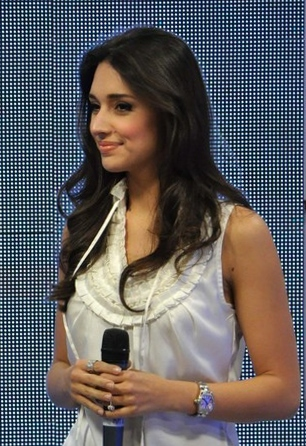
- Vega in 2010
- Born: Amelia Patricia Vega Polanco; 7 November 1984 (age 41); Santiago de los Caballeros, Dominican Republic
- Occupations: Model; actress; author; singer
- Height: 6 ft 2 in (188 cm)
- Spouse: Al Horford (m. 2011)
- Children: 6
- Beauty pageant titleholder
- Title: Miss Santiago 2002; Miss Dominican Republic 2002; Miss Universe 2003
- Hair color: Brown
- Eye color: Brown
- Major competitions: Miss Dominican Republic 2002 (Winner); Miss Universe 2003 (Winner)
- Website: www.ameliavega.com

Amelia Patricia Vega Polanco (Spanish pronunciation: [aˈmelja ˈβeɣa]; born 7 November 1984) is a Dominican actress, model, author, singer and beauty queen. At the age of 18, she won the Miss Universe 2003 pageant, becoming the first ever Miss Universe from the Dominican Republic, as well as the youngest winner since 1994.

== Early life ==
Amelia Vega was born in Santiago de los Caballeros on November 7, 1984. Her father Otto Miguel Vega Rasuk is a general physician with offices in New York and Miami. Her mother, Patricia Amelia Polanco Álvarez, is one of the first women to graduate as a pilot in the Dominican Republic and represented the country in the 1980 Miss World pageant.

== Miss Universe ==
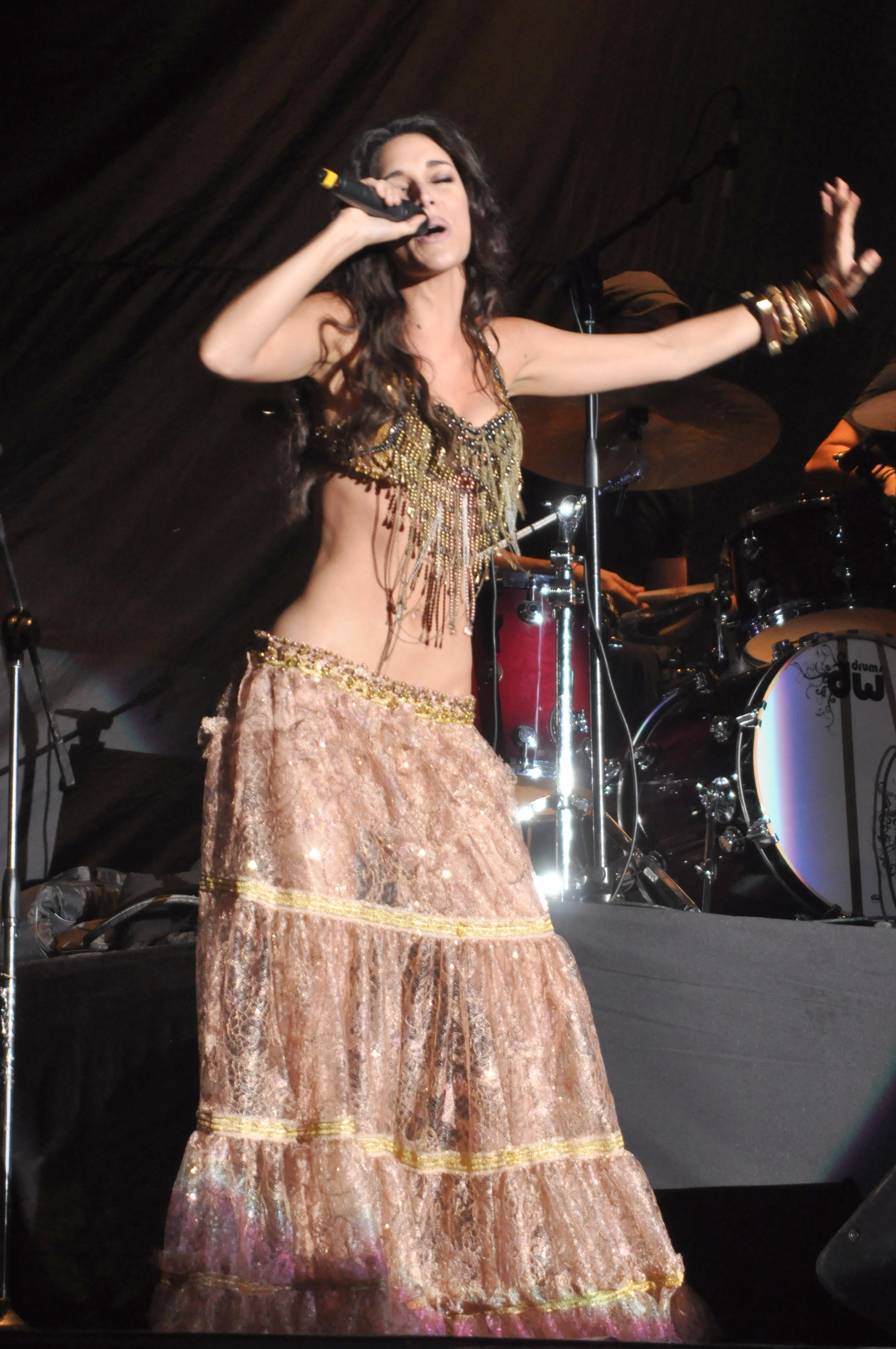
Amelia Vega

After winning the Miss Dominican Republic title, Vega represented the Dominican Republic in the Miss Universe 2003 pageant held in Panama City on 3 June 2003. She became the first delegate from the Dominican to win the title. At the time she was the youngest woman since 1994 to win Miss Universe and, as of 2024, is the tallest winner, standing at 6'2".

== Music ==
After recording her first demo at 15 years old and starting her artistic career in musicals in her hometown at the same age, Amelia's first single "Pasa Un Segundito" was released by iTunes on 26 April 2010. It became a top Latin song in just two days. A couple of months later, she released an environmental song, "Smog". She announced on her Twitter account that her complete album Agua Dulce would be released on 30 August 2011, first on iTunes. She began promoting her music in Puerto Rico, Ecuador, Panama, Dominican Republic "where she opened the concert for Marc Anthony and Chayanne in front of a crowd of 50,000 people".

== Personal life ==
On 24 December 2011, Vega married Dominican NBA player Al Horford in Santo Domingo, after two years of dating. They have six children together: Ean, Alía, Ava, Nova, Mila and Vail.

Vega is niece-in-law of the Grammy Award–winning Dominican singer Juan Luis Guerra. She attended and graduated from Barbizon Modeling and Acting School in Santo Domingo.

Vega is the sixth generation of women in her family who bears Amelia either as their first name or middle name.

== Filmography ==
- Captain Avispa (2024) .... Amelia Vega as (Polibya Néctar)
- Homie Spumoni (2006) .... Amelia Vega as (Chanice)
- The Lost City (2005) .... Minerva Eros

== Books ==
In 2019, Amelia Vega published her first children's book, titled Un día en la vida de Pichín, in support of children with cancer.

Awards and achievements
Preceded by (Russia) Oxana Fedorova (Terminated) (Panama) Justine Pasek (Assumed)	Miss Universe; 2003	Succeeded by (Australia) Jennifer Hawkins
Preceded by Ruth Ocumárez	Miss Dominican Republic; 2003	Succeeded by Larimar Fiallo
Preceded by Isaura Montás	Miss Santiago; 2003	Succeeded by Pamela Sued
