= Miss International 2005 =

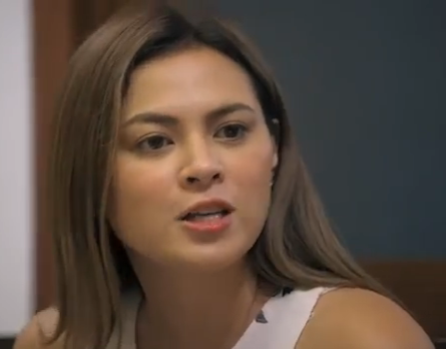
- Precious Lara Quigaman, Miss International 2005
- Date: September 26, 2005
- Presenters: Masumi Okada
- Venue: Koseinenkin Hall, Tokyo, Japan
- Broadcaster: TV Tokyo
- Entrants: 52
- Placements: 12
- Debuts: Kazakhstan; Macau; Tanzania
- Withdrawals: Angola; Chile; Costa Rica; Egypt; Hawaii; Hungary; Iceland; Latvia; Lebanon; Mexico; Northern Mariana Islands; Romania; Russia; Senegal; Tunisia; Zambia
- Returns: Honduras; Nepal; New Zealand; Nicaragua; Paraguay; Sweden; Taiwan
- Winner: Lara Quigaman; Philippines
- Congeniality: Queenie Chu; Hong Kong
- Best National Costume: Margareth Wilson; Tanzania
- Photogenic: Yang Li; China

Miss International 2005 was the 45th Miss International pageant, held at the Koseinenkin Hall in Tokyo, Japan, on September 26, 2005.

Jeymmy Vargas of Colombia crowned Lara Quigaman of the Philippines as her successor at the end of the event. She became the fourth Filipino to win the pageant.

== Results ==
=== Placements ===
Placement	Contestant
Miss International 2005	Philippines – Precious Lara Quigaman
1st Runner-Up	Dominican Republic – Yadira Geara
2nd Runner-Up	Finland – Susanna Laine
Top 12	Brazil – Ariane Colombo; Colombia – Diana Arbeláez; France – Cynthia Tevere; Japan – Naomi Ishizaka; Peru – Vanessa López Vera; Serbia and Montenegro – Sanja Miljanic; Turkey – Sebnem Asade; Ukraine – Mariya Zhukova; Venezuela – Andrea Gómez

=== Special awards ===
Awards	Contestant
Miss Friendship	Hong Kong - Wai Man Queenie Chu
Miss Photogenic	China - Yang Li
Best National Costume	Tanzania - Margareth Wilson Chacha

== Contestants ==
- Aruba – Gita van Bochove
- Australia – Natalie Gillard
- Bahamas – Brianna Clarke
- Bolivia – Gretel María Stehli Parada
- Brazil – Ariane Colombo
- Canada – Micaela Smith
- China – Yang Li
- Colombia – Diana Patricia Arbeláez González
- Cyprus – Charis Dimitriou
- Czech Republic – Petra Machackova
- Dominican Republic – Yadira Geara Cury
- Ecuador – Bianca María Salame Avilés
- El Salvador – Ana Saidia Palma Rebollo
- Ethiopia – Dina Fekadu Mosissa
- Finland – Susanna Laine
- France – Cynthia Tevere
- Germany – Annika Pinter
- Greece – Panagiota Perimeni
- Honduras – Ingrid Lopez
- Hong Kong – Queenie Chu
- India – Vaishali Desai
- Israel – Moran Gerbi
- Japan – Naomi Ishizaka
- Kazakhstan – Antontseva Segeevna
- Macau – Zheng Ma
- Malaysia – Winnie Chan Wai Ling
- Mongolia – Gantogoo Bayaarkhuu
- Nepal – Nisha Adhikary
- New Caledonia – Lesley Delrieu
- New Zealand – Ellie Bloomfield
- Nicaragua – Daniela Regina Clerk
- Norway – Karoline Nakken
- Panama – Lucía Matamoros
- Paraguay – Liz Concepción Santacruz Amarilla
- Peru – Vanessa López Vera Tudela
- Philippines – Precious Lara San Agustin Quigaman
- Poland – Monika Szeroka
- Puerto Rico – Dinorah Collazo
- Serbia and Montenegro – Sanja Miljanic
- Singapore – Catherine Tan
- Slovakia – Lucia Debnarova
- South Korea – Lee Kyoung-eun
- Spain – Maria del Pilar Domínquez
- Sweden – Cecilia Zatterlöf Harbo Kristensen
- Taiwan – Li Yen Chin
- Tanzania – Margareth Wilson Kiguha Chacha
- Thailand – Sukanya Pimmol
- Turkey – Şebnem Azade
- Ukraine – Mariya Zhukova
- United Kingdom – Amy Guy
- United States – Anna Ward
- Venezuela – Andrea Gómez

== Notes ==
=== Debuts ===
- Kazakhstan
- Macau
- Tanzania

=== Returns ===
- Last competed in 1998:
  - Paraguay
- Last competed in 2000:
  - Honduras
  - Nepal
  - Taiwan
- Last competed in 2002:
  - Nicaragua
  - Sweden
- Last competed in 2003:
  - New Zealand

=== Withdrawals ===
- Angola
- Chile
- Costa Rica
- Egypt
- Hawaii
- Hungary
- Iceland
- Latvia
- Lebanon
- Mexico
- Northern Mariana Islands
- Romania
- Russia
- Senegal
- Tunisia
- Zambia
