= Larimar Fiallo =

Dominican beauty pageant titleholder

- Born: Larissa del Mar Fiallo Scanlón Cabrera; 17 June 1983 (age 43); La Vega, Dominican Republic
- Height: 6 ft 1 in (1.85 m)
- Beauty pageant titleholder
- Title: Miss Dominican Republic 2004
- Hair color: Brown
- Eye color: Brown
- Major competitions: Miss Dominican Republic 2004 (winner); Miss Universe 2004

Larissa del Mar Fiallo Scanlon (born 17 June 1983 in Concepción de la Vega), commonly known as Larimar Fiallo, is a Dominican beauty pageant titleholder who represented her country at the Miss Universe 2004 pageant.

She represented her home province La Vega in winning the Miss Dominican Republic Universe 2004 pageant. Her mother, Gisselle Scanlon Grullón, represented the Dominican Republic at Miss World 1974. Fiallo now works as psychologist.

== Family ==
She was born to Alberto Emilio Fiallo Billini (1945–) and Giselle Josephine Scanlon Grullón (1956–), both prominent doctors. Her father was son of Margarita María Billini Morales, a painter, and Antinoe Fiallo Rodríguez; and thus, a nephew of Viriato Fiallo Rodríguez, and first cousin-once removed of Oscar de la Renta. Her mother, Giselle Scanlon, was born to Thomas Scanlon, an Irish American, and Zaida Grullón Gómez, a Dominican; Scanlon was also Miss Dominican Republic 1974 and is currently executive director of the Instituto Nacional de la Salud (Insalud).

Awards and achievements
| Preceded by Amelia Vega | Miss Dominican Republic; 2004 | Succeeded by Renata Soñé |
