= El Cercado =

San Pedro de El Cercado
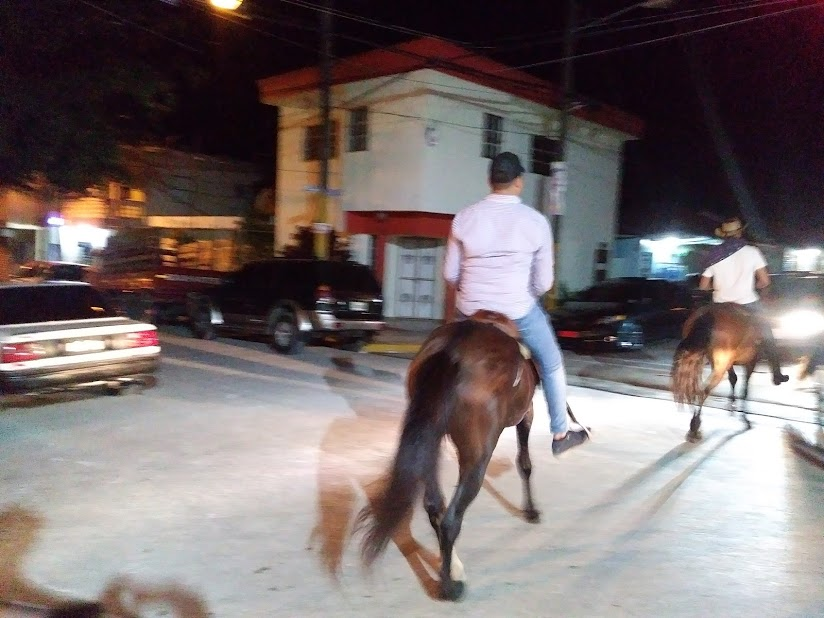

- El Cercado in the Dominican Republic
- Coordinates: 18°43′48″N 71°31′12″W
- Country: Dominican Republic
- Province: San Juan

Area
  - Total: 283.05 km^{2} (109.29 sq mi)

Population (2012)
  - Total: 25,688
  - Density: 90.754/km^{2} (235.05/sq mi)
  - Urban: 2,585
- Municipal Districts: 2

El Cercado is a rural town in the San Juan province of the Dominican Republic. It is located in the southwest region of the country. According to the 2010 census the town has a population of 20,843 inhabitants, 11,312 are men and 9,531 women.

Its population has decreased in recent years as many people emigrate to Santo Domingo and other areas of the country looking for a better life, as well as also for study reasons.

Its name is because the municipality is nearby and surrounded by mountains.

== History ==
The community of El Cercado was founded in 1845 by President Pedro Santana. It previously belonged to the municipality of Bánica and was called the Sabana del Bohío, and was elevated to town by President Fernando Arturo de Meriño in 1888. The first families to settle in this area were Florencio Montero, Telésforo de Oleo, Encarnación, Manuelica y Fidel Matos and Leonardo Brito.

== Economy ==
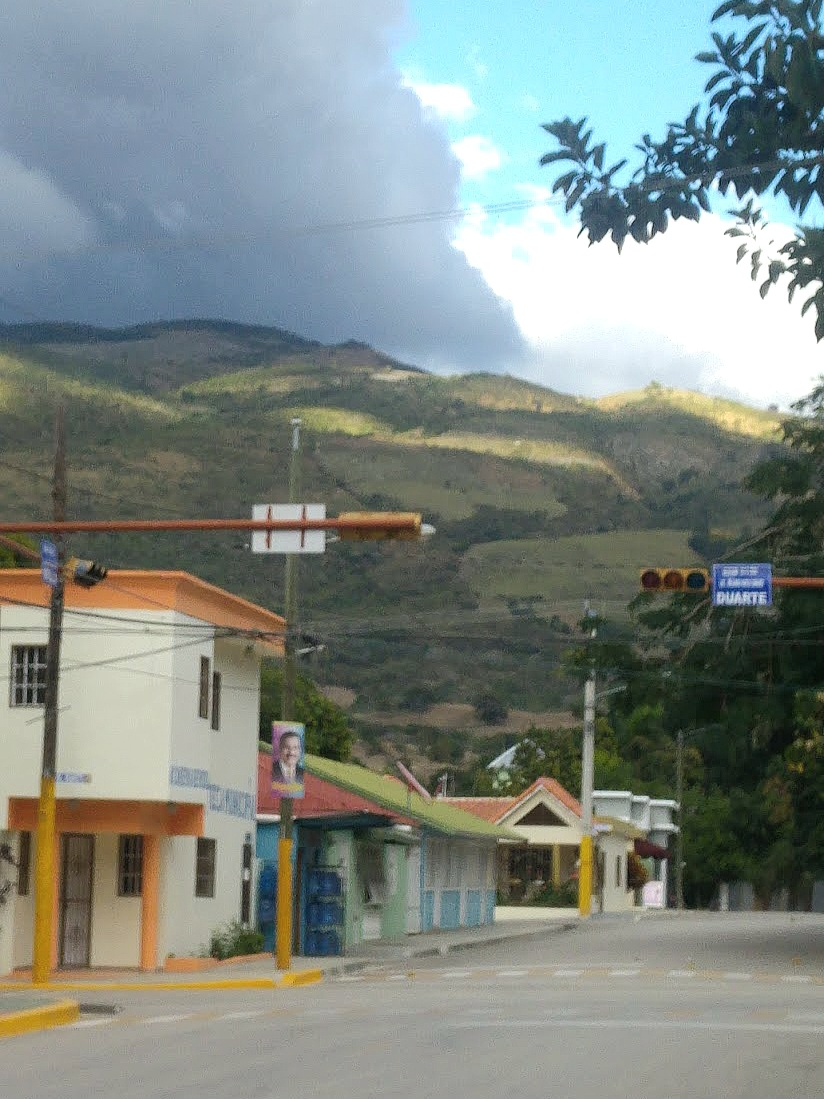
El Cercado, Dominican Republic town streets.

The economic activities of the municipality are based on large-scale agriculture and commerce. The main crops are beans, pigeon peas, onion, avocado, sour and sweet orange, corn, rice, sweet potato, pumpkin and coffee; other minor fruits and vegetables are also produced there.

The economically active population (EAP) consists of 7,845 people, of which 5,803 (74%) are currently employed. Of those employees, 548 (9%) work as public servants. Currently, the fence is one of the most prominent municipalities in all of San Juan.

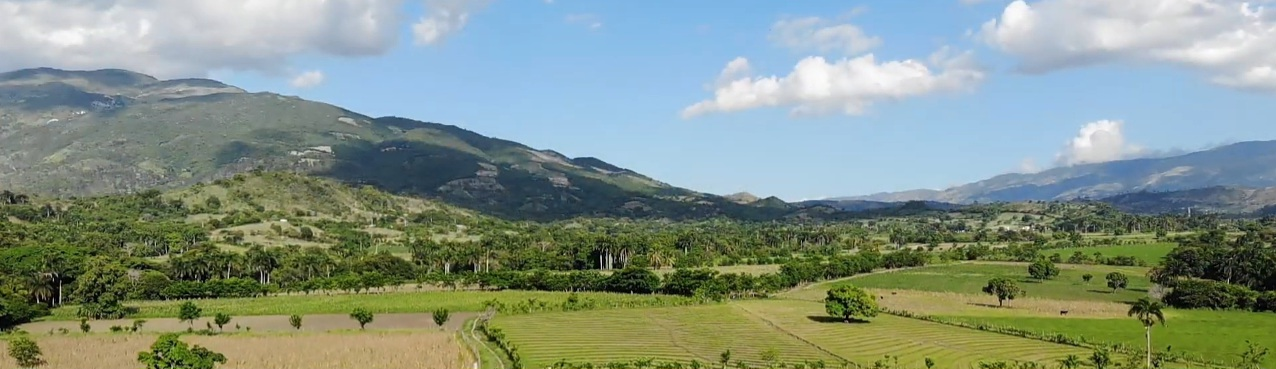
Cercado, Dominican Republic landscape.

== Climate ==
El Cercado has a tropical savanna climate (Köppen climate classification: Aw).

Climate data for El Cercado (1961–1990)
Month	Jan	Feb	Mar	Apr	May	Jun	Jul	Aug	Sep	Oct	Nov	Dec	Year
Record high °C (°F)	33.5 (92.3)	34.0 (93.2)	35.1 (95.2)	37.0 (98.6)	35.1 (95.2)	36.0 (96.8)	36.5 (97.7)	36.0 (96.8)	37.0 (98.6)	35.2 (95.4)	38.0 (100.4)	32.3 (90.1)	38.0 (100.4)
Mean daily maximum °C (°F)	27.9 (82.2)	28.9 (84.0)	30.1 (86.2)	30.8 (87.4)	30.1 (86.2)	31.0 (87.8)	31.7 (89.1)	31.4 (88.5)	31.0 (87.8)	30.0 (86.0)	28.7 (83.7)	27.6 (81.7)	29.9 (85.8)
Mean daily minimum °C (°F)	13.0 (55.4)	14.0 (57.2)	15.0 (59.0)	15.9 (60.6)	17.0 (62.6)	17.9 (64.2)	17.7 (63.9)	17.2 (63.0)	17.1 (62.8)	16.8 (62.2)	15.3 (59.5)	13.5 (56.3)	15.9 (60.6)
Record low °C (°F)	5.7 (42.3)	7.2 (45.0)	7.0 (44.6)	8.0 (46.4)	8.0 (46.4)	10.0 (50.0)	9.0 (48.2)	9.0 (48.2)	9.0 (48.2)	9.0 (48.2)	8.0 (46.4)	7.0 (44.6)	5.7 (42.3)
Average rainfall mm (inches)	12.9 (0.51)	20.3 (0.80)	43.3 (1.70)	120.6 (4.75)	190.9 (7.52)	83.2 (3.28)	79.0 (3.11)	138.5 (5.45)	161.4 (6.35)	164.3 (6.47)	81.3 (3.20)	19.5 (0.77)	1,115.2 (43.91)
Average rainy days (≥ 1.0 mm)	1.7	2.0	3.8	8.3	11.2	6.9	6.8	8.7	10.7	11.7	6.7	2.5	81.0
Source: NOAA

== Sources ==
- World Gazeteer: Dominican Republic – World-Gazetteer.com
