= Cabrera, María Trinidad Sánchez =

Cabrera
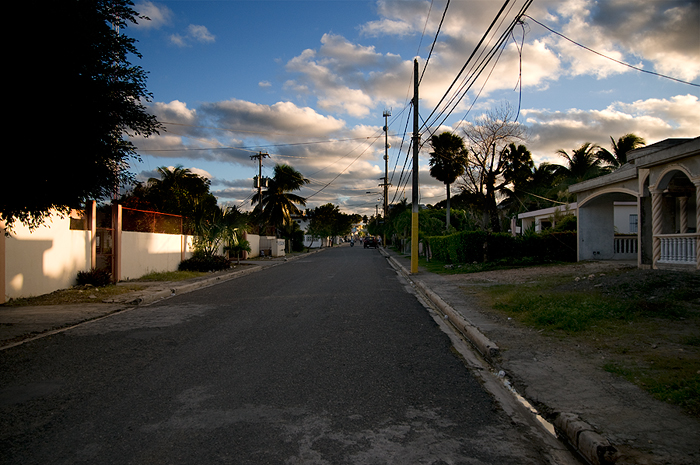

- Location within the Dominican Republic
- Coordinates: 19°37′48″N 69°54′0″W
- Country: Dominican Republic
- Province: María Trinidad Sánchez
- Tres Amarras: 07/01/1891

Area
  - Total: 297.58 km^{2} (114.90 sq mi)
- Elevation: 5 m (16 ft)

Population (2012)
  - Total: 24,218
  - Density: 81.383/km^{2} (210.78/sq mi)
  - Demonym: Cabrereño(a)
- Distance to – Nagua: 35 km
- Municipal Districts: 2

Cabrera is a town in María Trinidad Sánchez province, Dominican Republic. It is located at the eastern end of the country's north coast, at the western extreme of the Scottish Bay, 130 kilometers north of Santo Domingo.

The town was originally named 'Tres Amarras', the name it used to be called since its foundation day on July 1, 1891. The city was renamed to 'Cabrera' in honor of General José Cabrera, one of the key initiators of the Grito de Capotillo, the act that triggered the Dominican Restoration War.

Today Cabrera has a territorial area of 276 km^{2}. With a population of over 39,000, Cabrera unlike most towns located on the coasts does not depend so much on tourism. Cabrera's main source of income is cattle, meat, and milk. In the agricultural aspect, production of coconuts and rice are noticeable sources as well.

Located facing the Atlantic, Cabrera has beaches, rivers, exotic vegetation and other natural features and attractions. A National Park reserve is located in El Breton, a small section of Cabrera called Cabo Francés Viejo (Cape Old Frenchman). Local beaches include El Diamante (Diamond Beach), Playa La Entrada, El Caleton de Dario, El Caleton del Medio, and El Caleton Chiquito.

Cabrera's mainstream religion is the Christian Evangelic Church; this is not true for most towns in the island since Catholicism is the official religion in the Dominican Republic. However, Cabrera has a prominent renovated Catholic church located in the city center.

== Climate ==
Climate data for Cabrera, María Trinidad Sánchez (1991–2020)
Month	Jan	Feb	Mar	Apr	May	Jun	Jul	Aug	Sep	Oct	Nov	Dec	Year
Mean daily maximum °C (°F)	28.9 (84.0)	29.2 (84.6)	29.3 (84.7)	30.7 (87.3)	31.0 (87.8)	32.0 (89.6)	32.2 (90.0)	32.3 (90.1)	32.7 (90.9)	32.1 (89.8)	30.4 (86.7)	29.5 (85.1)	30.9 (87.6)
Daily mean °C (°F)	25.0 (77.0)	25.3 (77.5)	25.5 (77.9)	26.5 (79.7)	26.8 (80.2)	27.7 (81.9)	27.9 (82.2)	27.9 (82.2)	27.9 (82.2)	27.6 (81.7)	26.3 (79.3)	25.5 (77.9)	26.7 (80.1)
Mean daily minimum °C (°F)	21.2 (70.2)	21.4 (70.5)	21.7 (71.1)	22.2 (72.0)	22.7 (72.9)	23.3 (73.9)	23.6 (74.5)	23.4 (74.1)	23.1 (73.6)	23.0 (73.4)	22.2 (72.0)	21.6 (70.9)	22.5 (72.5)
Average precipitation mm (inches)	145.5 (5.73)	105.6 (4.16)	98.3 (3.87)	127.4 (5.02)	194.1 (7.64)	88.5 (3.48)	145.8 (5.74)	150.7 (5.93)	109.7 (4.32)	167.9 (6.61)	247.9 (9.76)	151.6 (5.97)	1,733 (68.23)
Source: National Oceanic and Atmospheric Administration

Climate data for Cabrera, María Trinidad Sánchez (1971–2000)
Month	Jan	Feb	Mar	Apr	May	Jun	Jul	Aug	Sep	Oct	Nov	Dec	Year
Record high °C (°F)	32.7 (90.9)	31.8 (89.2)	33.0 (91.4)	32.9 (91.2)	33.3 (91.9)	34.3 (93.7)	34.6 (94.3)	33.8 (92.8)	33.7 (92.7)	32.8 (91.0)	33.5 (92.3)	31.6 (88.9)	34.6 (94.3)
Mean daily maximum °C (°F)	28.1 (82.6)	28.3 (82.9)	28.8 (83.8)	29.3 (84.7)	29.9 (85.8)	30.5 (86.9)	30.6 (87.1)	30.7 (87.3)	30.7 (87.3)	30.0 (86.0)	29.4 (84.9)	28.3 (82.9)	29.6 (85.2)
Daily mean °C (°F)	24.7 (76.5)	24.8 (76.6)	25.2 (77.4)	25.8 (78.4)	26.3 (79.3)	27.0 (80.6)	27.1 (80.8)	27.1 (80.8)	27.0 (80.6)	26.5 (79.7)	25.9 (78.6)	25.0 (77.0)	26.0 (78.9)
Mean daily minimum °C (°F)	21.3 (70.3)	21.3 (70.3)	21.8 (71.2)	22.4 (72.3)	22.9 (73.2)	23.5 (74.3)	23.6 (74.5)	23.4 (74.1)	23.3 (73.9)	23.1 (73.6)	22.5 (72.5)	21.7 (71.1)	22.6 (72.6)
Record low °C (°F)	16.8 (62.2)	15.4 (59.7)	17.0 (62.6)	17.5 (63.5)	19.1 (66.4)	19.0 (66.2)	19.7 (67.5)	19.0 (66.2)	17.6 (63.7)	19.1 (66.4)	18.3 (64.9)	17.5 (63.5)	15.4 (59.7)
Average rainfall mm (inches)	116.4 (4.58)	80.2 (3.16)	80.0 (3.15)	117.4 (4.62)	138.2 (5.44)	92.1 (3.63)	111.2 (4.38)	139.4 (5.49)	121.3 (4.78)	187.0 (7.36)	231.0 (9.09)	127.6 (5.02)	1,541.8 (60.7)
Average rainy days (≥ 1.0 mm)	12.5	8.2	8.1	8.5	9.6	8.3	11.5	12.9	11.6	14.3	15.3	13.6	134.4
Source: ONAMET

Climate data for Cabrera, María Trinidad Sánchez (1961–1990)
Month	Jan	Feb	Mar	Apr	May	Jun	Jul	Aug	Sep	Oct	Nov	Dec	Year
Record high °C (°F)	35.1 (95.2)	35.2 (95.4)	34.3 (93.7)	35.5 (95.9)	35.6 (96.1)	35.8 (96.4)	34.6 (94.3)	35.5 (95.9)	35.5 (95.9)	35.5 (95.9)	36.2 (97.2)	36.2 (97.2)	36.2 (97.2)
Mean daily maximum °C (°F)	28.3 (82.9)	28.4 (83.1)	28.9 (84.0)	29.4 (84.9)	29.8 (85.6)	30.6 (87.1)	30.5 (86.9)	30.8 (87.4)	30.9 (87.6)	30.3 (86.5)	29.4 (84.9)	28.6 (83.5)	29.7 (85.5)
Daily mean °C (°F)	24.6 (76.3)	24.7 (76.5)	25.2 (77.4)	25.6 (78.1)	26.1 (79.0)	26.7 (80.1)	26.8 (80.2)	26.9 (80.4)	26.8 (80.2)	26.5 (79.7)	25.8 (78.4)	25.0 (77.0)	25.9 (78.6)
Mean daily minimum °C (°F)	21.1 (70.0)	21.1 (70.0)	21.6 (70.9)	21.9 (71.4)	22.4 (72.3)	22.9 (73.2)	23.1 (73.6)	23.0 (73.4)	22.8 (73.0)	22.8 (73.0)	22.3 (72.1)	21.5 (70.7)	22.2 (72.0)
Record low °C (°F)	12.2 (54.0)	15.4 (59.7)	17.0 (62.6)	16.4 (61.5)	17.0 (62.6)	17.0 (62.6)	17.4 (63.3)	16.0 (60.8)	17.4 (63.3)	16.0 (60.8)	17.4 (63.3)	15.5 (59.9)	12.2 (54.0)
Average rainfall mm (inches)	124.8 (4.91)	77.2 (3.04)	78.0 (3.07)	115.6 (4.55)	172.1 (6.78)	101.9 (4.01)	126.5 (4.98)	155.3 (6.11)	133.0 (5.24)	192.4 (7.57)	248.0 (9.76)	152.8 (6.02)	1,677.6 (66.05)
Average rainy days (≥ 1.0 mm)	12.4	7.4	7.5	7.8	10.8	8.8	13.2	14.0	11.8	14.0	15.9	14.5	138.1
Source: NOAA
