= Río San Juan, Dominican Republic =

Río San Juan
- Location within the Dominican Republic
- Coordinates: 19.64°N 70.08°W
- Country: Dominican Republic
- Province: María Trinidad Sánchez

Area
  - Total: 272.19 km^{2} (105.09 sq mi)
- Elevation: 5 m (16 ft)

Population (2012)
  - Total: 16,998
  - Density: 62.449/km^{2} (161.74/sq mi)
- Distance to – Nagua: 35 km
- Municipal Districts: 2

Río San Juan is a municipality in the María Trinidad Sánchez province of the Dominican Republic.

== Climate ==
Climate data for Río San Juan, Dominican Republic (1961–1990)
Month	Jan	Feb	Mar	Apr	May	Jun	Jul	Aug	Sep	Oct	Nov	Dec	Year
Record high °C (°F)	35.4 (95.7)	34.4 (93.9)	36.4 (97.5)	36.2 (97.2)	37.8 (100.0)	37.4 (99.3)	38.2 (100.8)	38.0 (100.4)	38.4 (101.1)	37.8 (100.0)	36.2 (97.2)	35.0 (95.0)	38.4 (101.1)
Mean daily maximum °C (°F)	28.6 (83.5)	29.2 (84.6)	30.2 (86.4)	30.7 (87.3)	31.6 (88.9)	32.6 (90.7)	32.8 (91.0)	32.3 (90.1)	32.7 (90.9)	32.0 (89.6)	30.1 (86.2)	28.5 (83.3)	30.9 (87.6)
Mean daily minimum °C (°F)	19.2 (66.6)	19.7 (67.5)	19.8 (67.6)	20.3 (68.5)	21.5 (70.7)	22.4 (72.3)	22.3 (72.1)	22.2 (72.0)	22.2 (72.0)	21.9 (71.4)	20.8 (69.4)	19.8 (67.6)	21.0 (69.8)
Record low °C (°F)	15.0 (59.0)	15.3 (59.5)	15.6 (60.1)	15.4 (59.7)	12.5 (54.5)	15.4 (59.7)	15.6 (60.1)	15.4 (59.7)	15.4 (59.7)	15.6 (60.1)	16.3 (61.3)	15.0 (59.0)	12.5 (54.5)
Average rainfall mm (inches)	141.2 (5.56)	87.5 (3.44)	89.1 (3.51)	133.2 (5.24)	202.8 (7.98)	106.2 (4.18)	110.1 (4.33)	165.4 (6.51)	139.3 (5.48)	151.8 (5.98)	270.8 (10.66)	256.5 (10.10)	1,853.9 (72.99)
Average rainy days (≥ 1.0 mm)	13.6	8.6	7.8	8.5	10.9	8.1	11.6	12.8	10.4	11.5	16.4	16.8	137.0
Source: NOAA

== Sources ==
- – World-Gazetteer.com
