= Yadira Geara =

Dominican Republic tennis player

- Full name: Yadira Rossina Geara Cury
- Country (sports): Dominican Republic
- Born: 1 February 1986 (age 40) Ensanche La Fé, Santo Domingo

Doubles
- Career record: 1–2 (Federation Cup)

Yadira Geara Cury (born 1 February 1986) is a Dominican former tennis player and beauty pageant titleholder. She played for the Dominican Republic Fed Cup team in 2002 and 2003. she also represented Dominican Republic at Miss International 2005 in Japan where she placed 1st runner-up.
