= María Trinidad Sánchez Province =

Province of the Dominican Republic

María Trinidad Sánchez
- Province
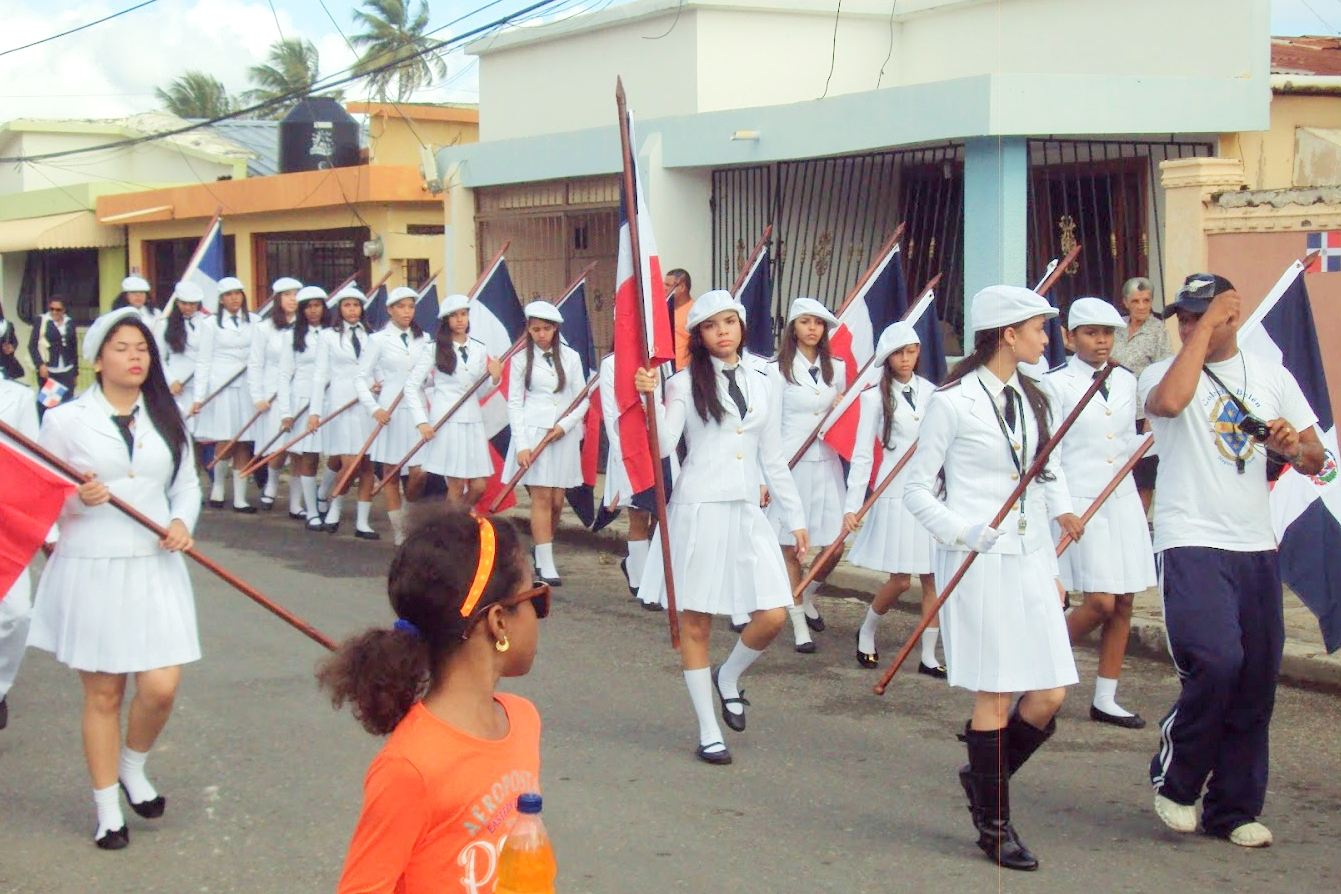
- Students in Nagua, Dominican Republic

- Location of the María Trinidad Sánchez Province
- Country: Dominican Republic
- Region: Cibao
- Province since: 1959
- Capital: Nagua

Government
  - Type: Subdivisions
  - Body: 4 municipalities 5 municipal districts
  - Congresspersons: 1 Senator; 3 Deputies

Area
  - Total: 1,271.71 km^{2} (491.01 sq mi)

Population (2014)
  - Total: 195,886
  - Density: 154.034/km^{2} (398.945/sq mi)
- Time zone: UTC-4 (EST)
- Area code: 1-809 1-829 1-849
- ISO 3166-2: DO-14
- Postal Code: 33000

María Trinidad Sánchez (Spanish pronunciation: [maˈɾi.a tɾiniˈðað ˈsantʃes]) is a province of the Dominican Republic. It was split from Samaná Province in September 1959 as Julia Molina Province; in November 1961, it got its current name. The name commemorates a distinguished female soldier in the wars of independence. María Trinidad Sánchez was the first woman incarcerated and executed by Pedro Santana, a Dominican annexionist president.

== History ==
Before the creation of the province, its territory was part of the Samaná province; It was created in 1959 with the name of the mother of Dictator Rafael Trujillo, Julia Molina (1865-1964). When the government was changed to that of President Bosch, the name was changed to the current one, María Trinidad Sánchez.

== Economy ==
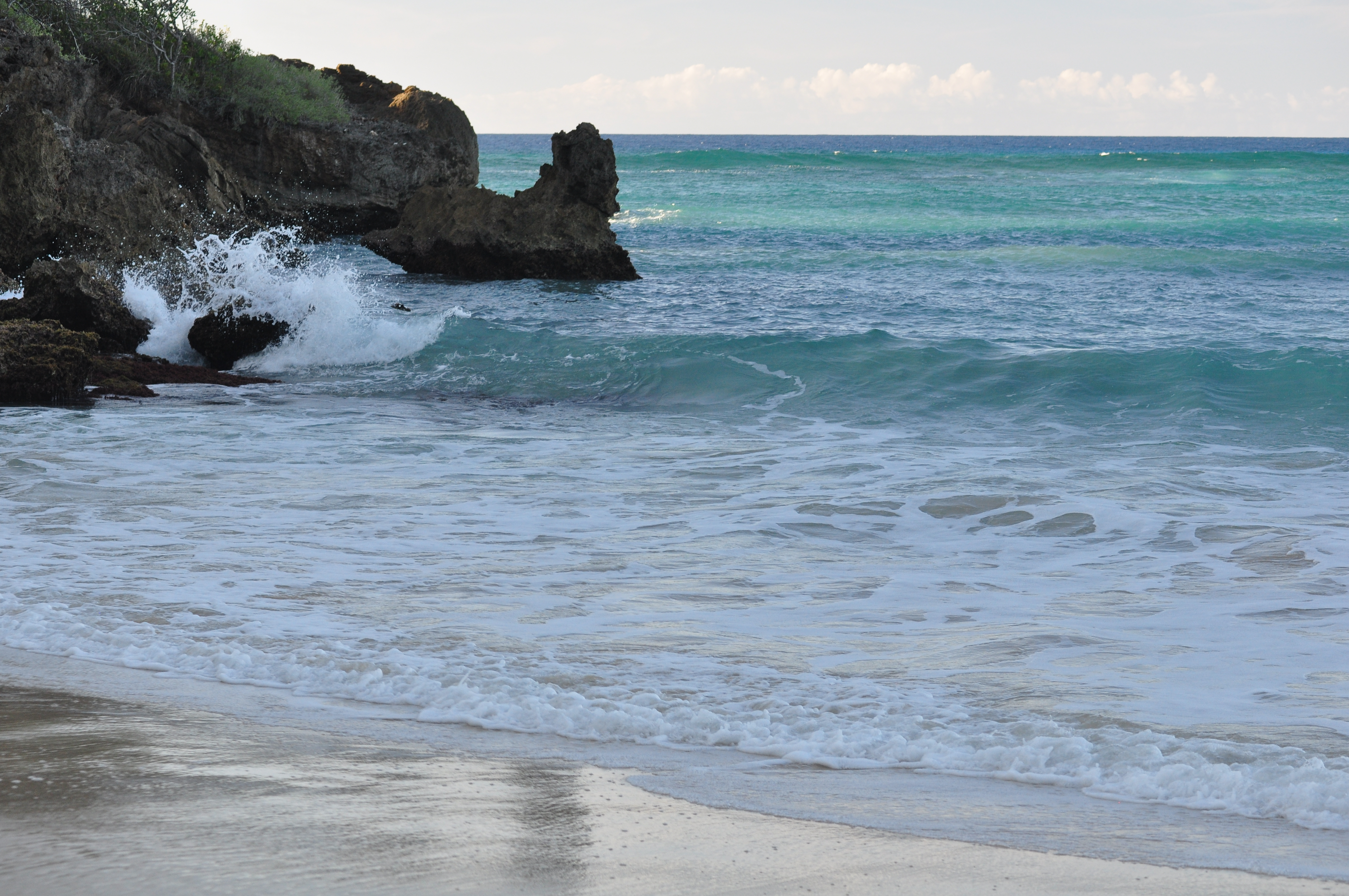
Rio San Juan in Maria Trinidad Sanchez, Dominican Republic

This province is a producer of rice, coconut, cocoa, fishing among other agricultural products. Cattle production is also done here. It is a popular tourist destination due to the large number of beaches it has on its coasts and the natural landscapes it has. Points of interest include: Cabo Francés Viejo National Park, La Gran Laguna, Laguna Gri Gri, Via Panoramica de Nagua-Cabrera or Nagua-Sánchez and the beaches Grande, El Caletón, El Bretón, La Preciosa, El Diamante, Arroyo Salado, Matancita and Poza de Bojolo.

Traditionally, the economic production of area was based on livestock, fishing and agriculture and was carried out by sea with Puerto Plata. Then in the decade of the 80s, the increase in tourist activity produced a great displacement of the rural population towards the city, so that agricultural production decreased considerably, projecting the economy of the municipality towards consumerism and not towards production, which allowed wealth to be concentrated in tourism and commercial enterprises. Communications

There is a transportation system made up of private companies that provide public transportation services to and from: Santo Domingo, Santiago de los Caballeros, Puerto Plata, Sosúa, Gaspar Hernández and Nagua. There is also a tourist taxi company with modern and comfortable transport units. Another widely used transport system is the Motoconcho, used mainly in the urban area.

Río San Juan is also popularly known for its Laguna Gri Gri, a large mangrove lagoon where you can embark and navigate between its mysterious caves and caves that have appeared by the erosion of the years. It is called Gri Gri due to the trees that are part of its abundant vegetation on the shore.

== Municipalities and municipal districts ==
The province as of June 20, 2006 is divided into the following municipalities (municipios) and municipal districts (distrito municipal - D.M.) within them:

- Cabrera
  - Arroyo Salado (D.M.)
  - La Entrada (D.M.)
- El Factor
  - El Pozo (D.M.)
- Nagua
  - Arroyo al Medio (D.M.)
  - Las Gordas (D.M.)
  - San José de Matanzas (D.M.)
- Río San Juan

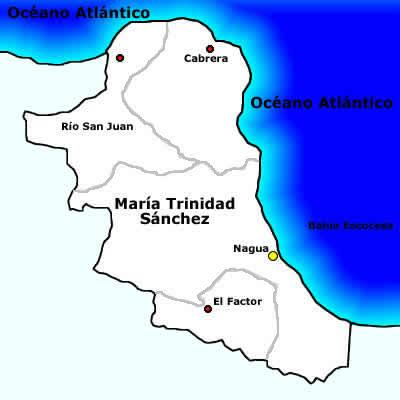
Municipalities of María Trinidad Sánchez Province

The following is a sortable table of the municipalities and municipal districts with population figures as of the 2012 census. Urban population are those living in the seats (cabeceras literally heads) of municipalities or of municipal districts. Rural population are those living in the districts (Secciones literally sections) and neighborhoods (Parajes literally places) outside of them.

| Name | Total population | Urban population | Rural population |
|---|---|---|---|
| Cabrera | 24,218 | 9,740 | 14,478 |
| El Factor | 20,148 | 10,072 | 10,076 |
| Nagua | 79,420 | 50,041 | 29,379 |
| Río San Juan | 16,998 | 12,443 | 4,555 |
| María Trinidad Sánchez province | 140,784 | 82,296 | 58,488 |

For comparison with the municipalities and municipal districts of other provinces see the list of municipalities and municipal districts of the Dominican Republic.
