= Santiago Rodríguez Province =

Province of the Dominican Republic

Santiago Rodríguez
- Province
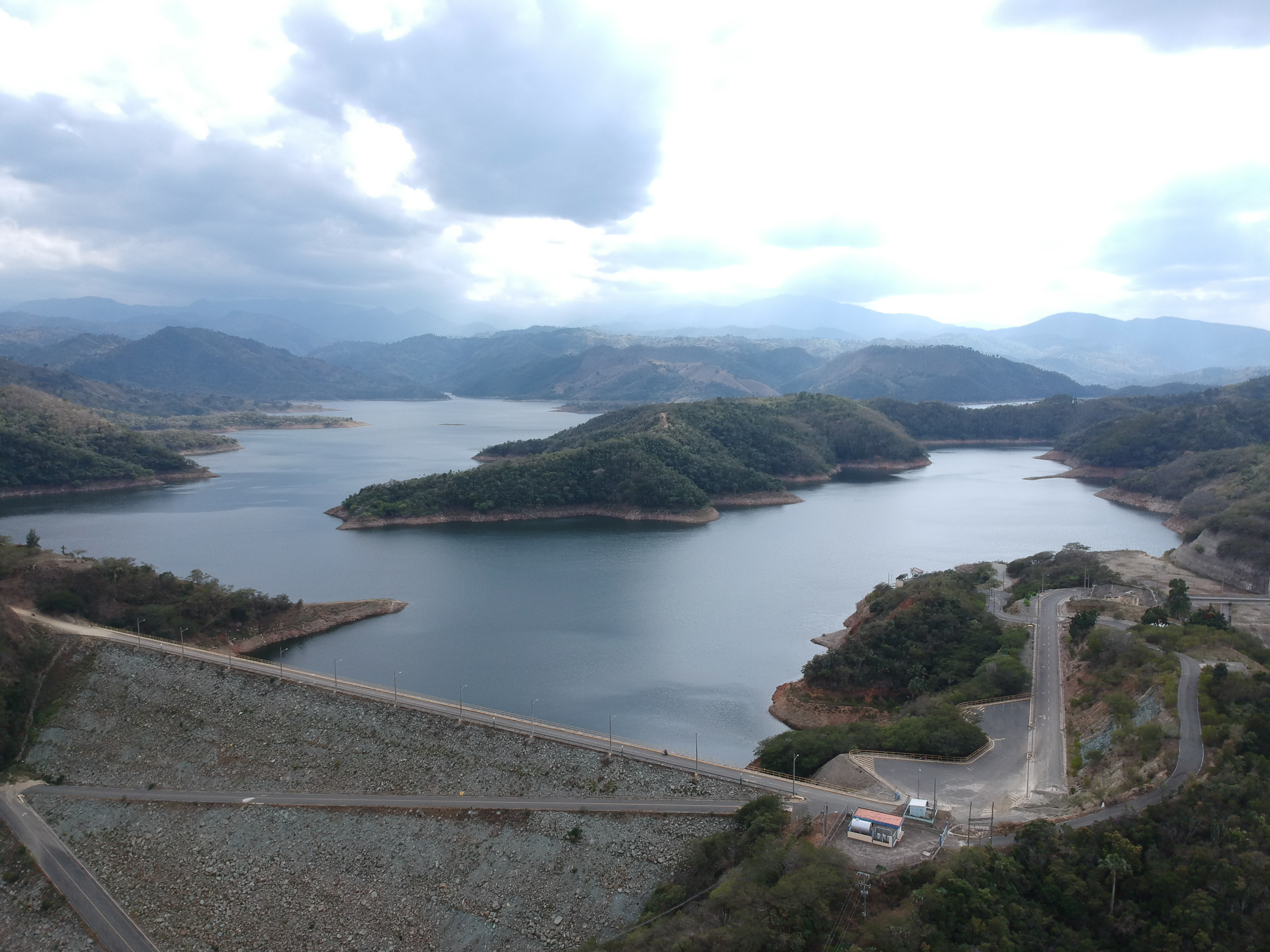
- Presa de Moncion, Santiago Rodriguez in Dominican Republic

- Location of the Santiago Rodríguez Province
- Coordinates: 19°24′59″N 71°20′27″W
- Country: Dominican Republic
- Region: Cibao
- Province since: 1948
- Capital: San Ignacio de Sabaneta

Government
  - Type: Subdivisions
  - Body: 3 municipalities 0 municipal districts
  - Congresspersons: 1 Senator (Antonio Cruz Torres); 2 Deputies

Area
  - Total: 1,111.14 km^{2} (429.01 sq mi)

Population (2022)
  - Total: 64,635
- Time zone: UTC-4 (AST)
- Area code: 1-809 1-829 1-849
- ISO 3166-2: DO-26
- Postal Code: 64000

Santiago Rodríguez (Spanish pronunciation: [sanˈtjaɣo roˈðɾiɣes]) is a province in the northwest region of the Dominican Republic. It was split from Monte Cristi in 1948. The Santiago Rodríguez province has the Monte Cristi and Valverde provinces to the north, the Santiago province to the east, the San Juan and Elías Piña provinces to the south and the Dajabón province to the west.

== Geography ==
The province of Santiago Rodríguez presents a rugged relief with characteristics such as mountains, forests, hills, savannas and valleys all around. To the north, and separating it from the great Cibao valley, a formation composed of xerophilous vegetation known as the "Sierra Zamba" is observed.

Wide canyons formed by the two rivers that drain the area, the Cana and the Gurabo, have formed and shaped a landscape composed of narrow gorges and ravines that embellish the topography of the region. In the south, the Central Mountain Range rises imposing itself on the Northeast landscape.

=== Climate ===
The province of Santiago Rodríguez has a variable altitude from 159 m s. n. m. in the city of San Ignacio de Sabaneta up to more than 2000 m s. n. m. in mountainous areas. It has a tropical humid forest climate at the foot of the Cordillera Central, dry subtropical north of the Sierra Zamba, tropical semi-humid in the center and temperate humid in the high mountainous areas of the Cordillera Central.

There are two rainy seasons a year, May–June and September–October, with May being the rainiest month. The average annual temperature is 25 °C in the lowlands and 16 °C in the mountainous plains.

The province of Santiago Rodríguez is the richest of the Northwest provinces in terms of hydrographic basins. Three of the most important rivers in the country are born in its territory: Mao, Artibonito and Guayubín.

== History ==
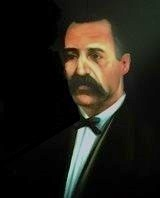
Santiago Rodríguez

The capital town of the province was founded in 1844 by Santiago Rodríguez, who was an officer of the Dominican army in the Dominican War of Independence. He was one of the founders of the city of Sabaneta and an important military leader during the initial stages of the Restoration War (1863–1865). Sabaneta was the centre of the fight against the Spanish soldiers during this war. In 1854, the town was elevated to the category of Military Post and in 1858 it was incorporated into a municipality of the Santiago province.

When 1879 Monte Cristi became a province, San Ignacio de Sabaneta was made a municipality of that new province. When the new province of Santiago Rodríguez was created in 1948, San Ignacio de Sabaneta was made the head municipality of the province. On March 23, 1898, the President of the Republic at that time, Ulises Heureaux, under decree No. 3799 assigned the name of Monción, in honor of the hero of the Dominican Restoration War, General Benito Monción.4 In In 1907, Monción became the official municipality of the province of Monte Cristi. Then, in 1948, when the Province of Santiago Rodríguez was created, it became its municipality. It is found specifically in the southwestern part of the province.

== Municipalities ==
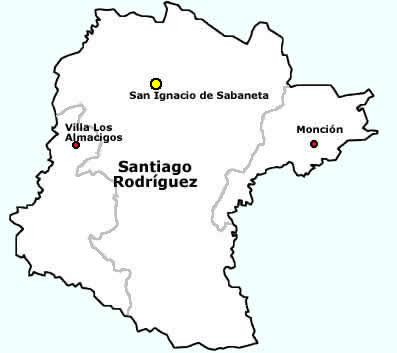
Municipalities of Santiago Rodríguez Province.

The province as of June 20, 2006 is divided into the following municipalities (municipios):

- San Ignacio de Sabaneta, provincial capital
- Monción
- Villa Los Almácigos

The following is a sortable table of the municipalities with population figures as of the 2022 census.

Name	Total population	Urban population	Rural population
Monción	14,021	9,017	5,004
San Ignacio de Sabaneta	38,798	19,116	19,682
Villa de los Almácigos	11,816	4,686	7,130
Santiago Rodríguez province	64,635	32,819	31,816

For comparison with the municipalities and municipal districts of other provinces see the list of municipalities and municipal districts of the Dominican Republic.

== Economy ==
The province has companies such as San Miguel del Caribe (Kola Real) and Mega Plax. The main economic activity in the province is agricultural production.

Although tourism has not developed as in other areas of the country, the province has ecotourism potential due to the high quality offered by its mountain landscapes, rivers and mild climate. Its main attractions are the mountains, including the Armando Bermúdez National Park area. The places of La Leonor, El Aguacate, Boca de los Mao, Cenovi, Lomita de La Cidra, La Peonía, El Burende and Palo Amarillo offer a warm and pleasant environment. Monte Gallo with 1840 meters of elevation and nestled in the national park, offers an extraordinary landscape. The installation of industries in the province is notable in recent years, favoring economic development.

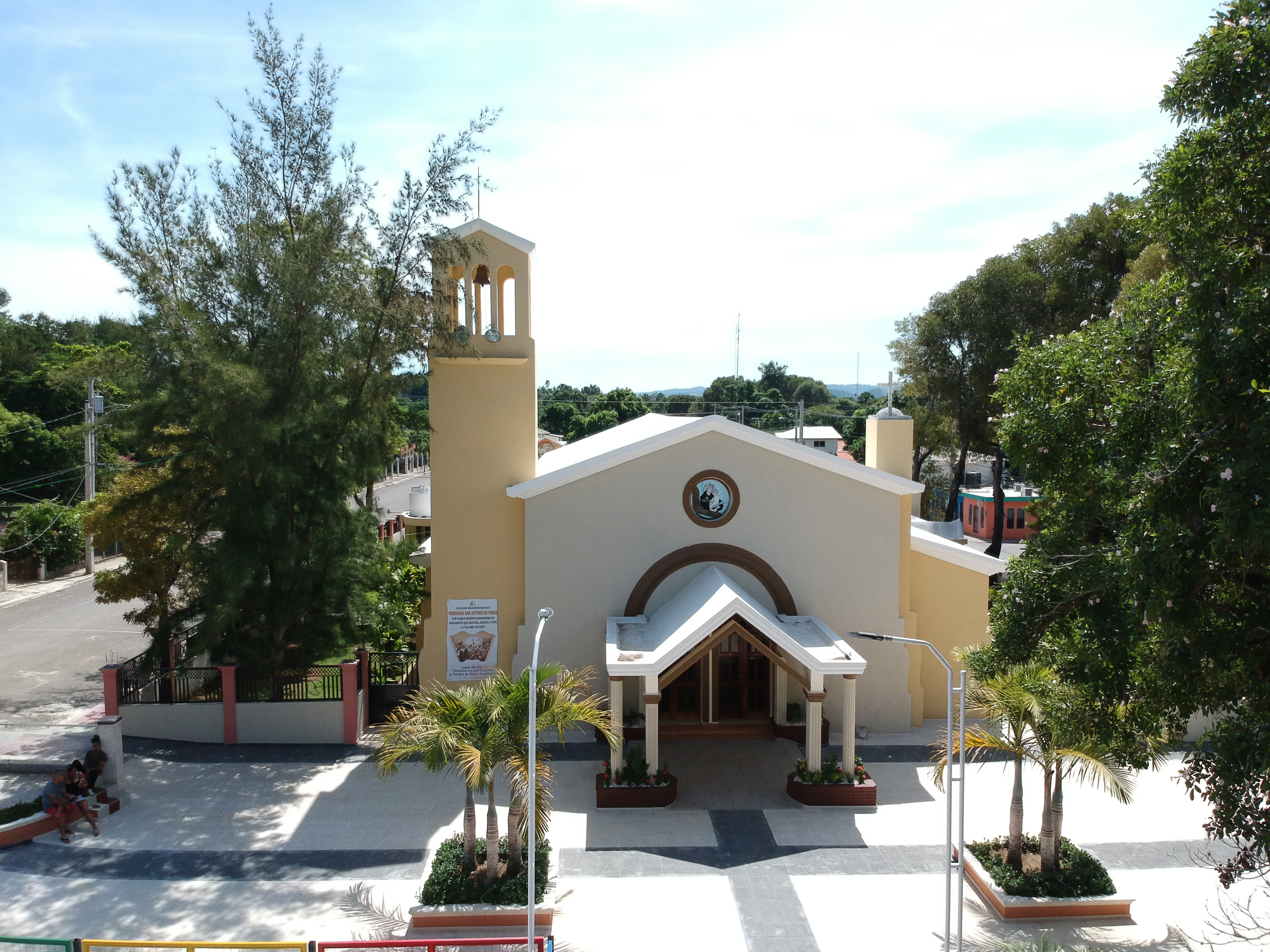
Church of San Antonio, Moncion, Dominican Republic.

According to the latest studies presented, the province is one of the best in terms of HDI in the Dominican Republic. Santiago Rodriguez is a province of the Dominican Republic that has attracted a lot of tourists, located mainly in the mountains. San Ignacio de Sabaneta, the main town is a clean city. The town has several parks, boulevards and a quiet atmosphere.

Just a few miles away, the visitor is going to find hills, mountains and one of the wildest places of the caribbean nature, that is Armando Bermudez National Park. This national park has rivers, mountain streams, and great variety of plants, birds and wildlife. One of the biggest attractions are the interminable pine trees, the largest stronghold of primary forest in the country. Next to this park is Moncion Damn or Presa de Moncion, an artificial lake surrounded by hills and mountains. Its deep blue waters are rich in fish.
