= San Juan Province (Dominican Republic) =

Province of the Dominican Republic

San Juan San Juan de la Maguana
- Province
- Coat of arms
- Nickname: El Granero del Sur (The Barn of The South)
- Location of the San Juan Province
- Coordinates: 18°53′25″N 71°16′00″W
- Country: Dominican Republic
- Province since: 1938
- Capital: San Juan de la Maguana

Government
  - Type: Subdivisions
  - Body: 6 municipalities 17 municipal districts
  - Congresspersons: 1 Senator; 5 Deputies

Area
  - Total: 3,569.39 km^{2} (1,378.15 sq mi)

Population (2014)
  - Total: 317,293
  - Density: 88.8928/km^{2} (230.231/sq mi)
- Time zone: UTC-4 (AST)
- Area code: 1-809 1-829 1-849
- ISO 3166-2: DO-22
- Postal Code: 72000

San Juan (Spanish pronunciation: [saŋ ˈxwan]) is a province of the Dominican Republic. Established as Benefactor during the Age of Trujillo in 1938, it was renamed San Juan in 1961. The landlocked province is located in the west-central part of the country. It is the largest province in the country, bearing a size of 3,569 square kilometers (1,378 miles).

== Geography ==
It comprises a total area of 3,569.39 km^{2}, being the largest province in the Dominican Republic, and according to the 2002 census it had a population of 241,105 inhabitants. It is crossed by numerous rivers, among which the San Juan River, the Yaque del Sur River, the Sabaneta River, the Macasías and the Mijo stand out.

It has three hydroelectric dams, Sabaneta, Sabana Yegua and Palomino, the latter inaugurated in 2013. Within the provincial territory there are three parks or protected areas, including the Juan Ulises García Bonelly Park, and the José Armando Bermúdez and José del Carmen Ramírez National Parks. In the area of Las Matas de Farfán there is a sulphurous spring, La Zurza, which is highly visited by regional tourism.

The San Juan province is located in the Valle Region along with the Provinces:Elías Piña and Azua. It is an intramontane territory, which does not have a marine coast, it limits to the north with the Provinces of Santiago Rodríguez and Santiago; to the south with Bahoruco; to the east with Azua, La Vega to the Northeast, and to the west with the Province of Elías Piña.

Its main heights are Pico Duarte and La Pelona.

== History ==
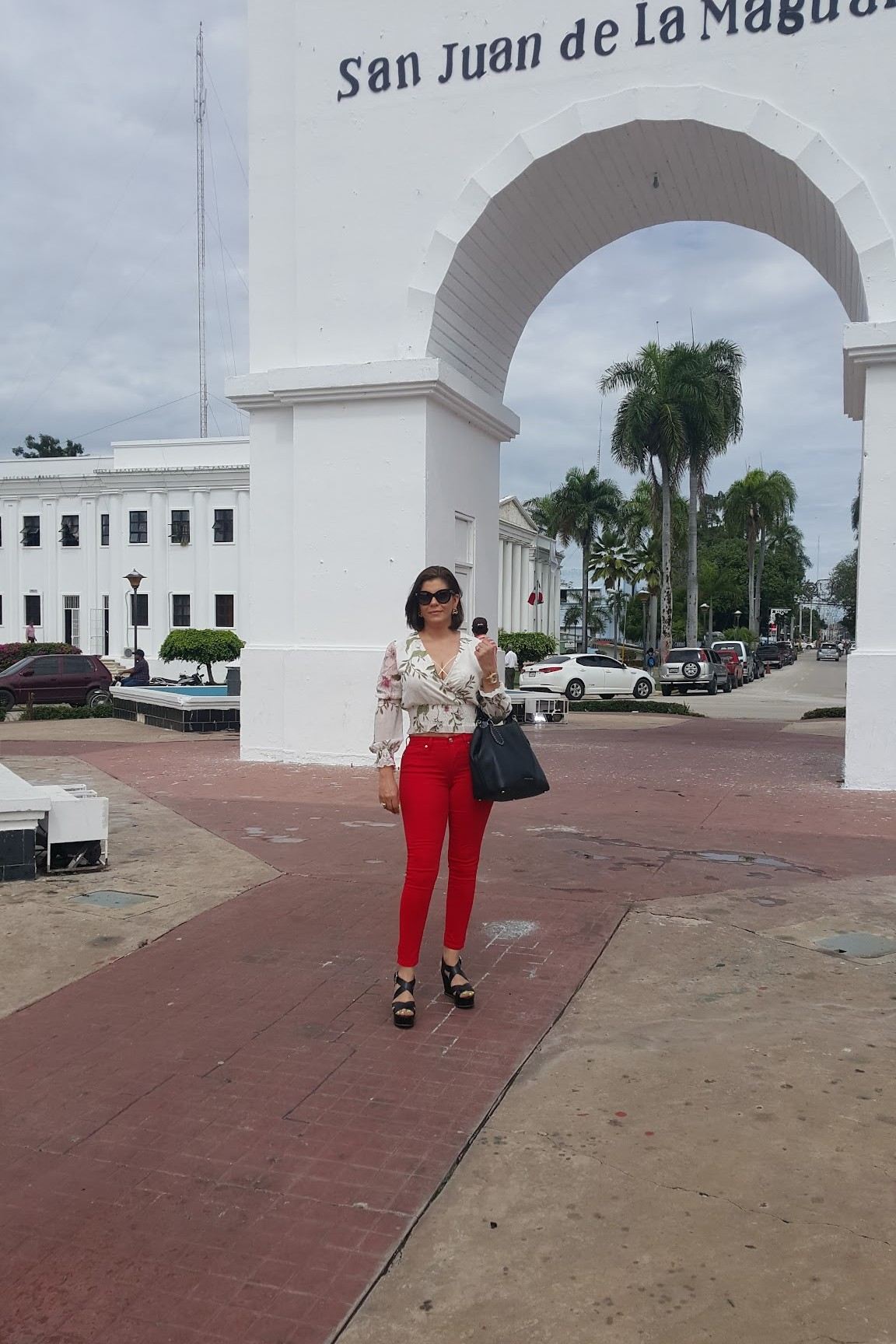
San Juan, Dominican Republic town.

At the time of the discovery, the San Juan region was one of the five Taíno chiefdoms into which the island of Quisqueya was divided.6 The chiefdom of Maguana or Maguanó, 7 with a center near the current capital, in Juan de Herrera; it was ruled by the cacique Caonabo.

In 1503 Nicolás de Ovando founded the city of San Juan de la Maguana, in honor of San Juan Bautista, in 1508 the title of town with its coat of arms was granted by royal decree. In 1605, as a result of the population changes and devastations faced by the governor of Santo Domingo, Antonio de Osorio, the inhabitants of San Juan happened to occupy Bayaguana, north of Santo Domingo, along with the rest of the Spanish uprooted from the unpopulated areas.

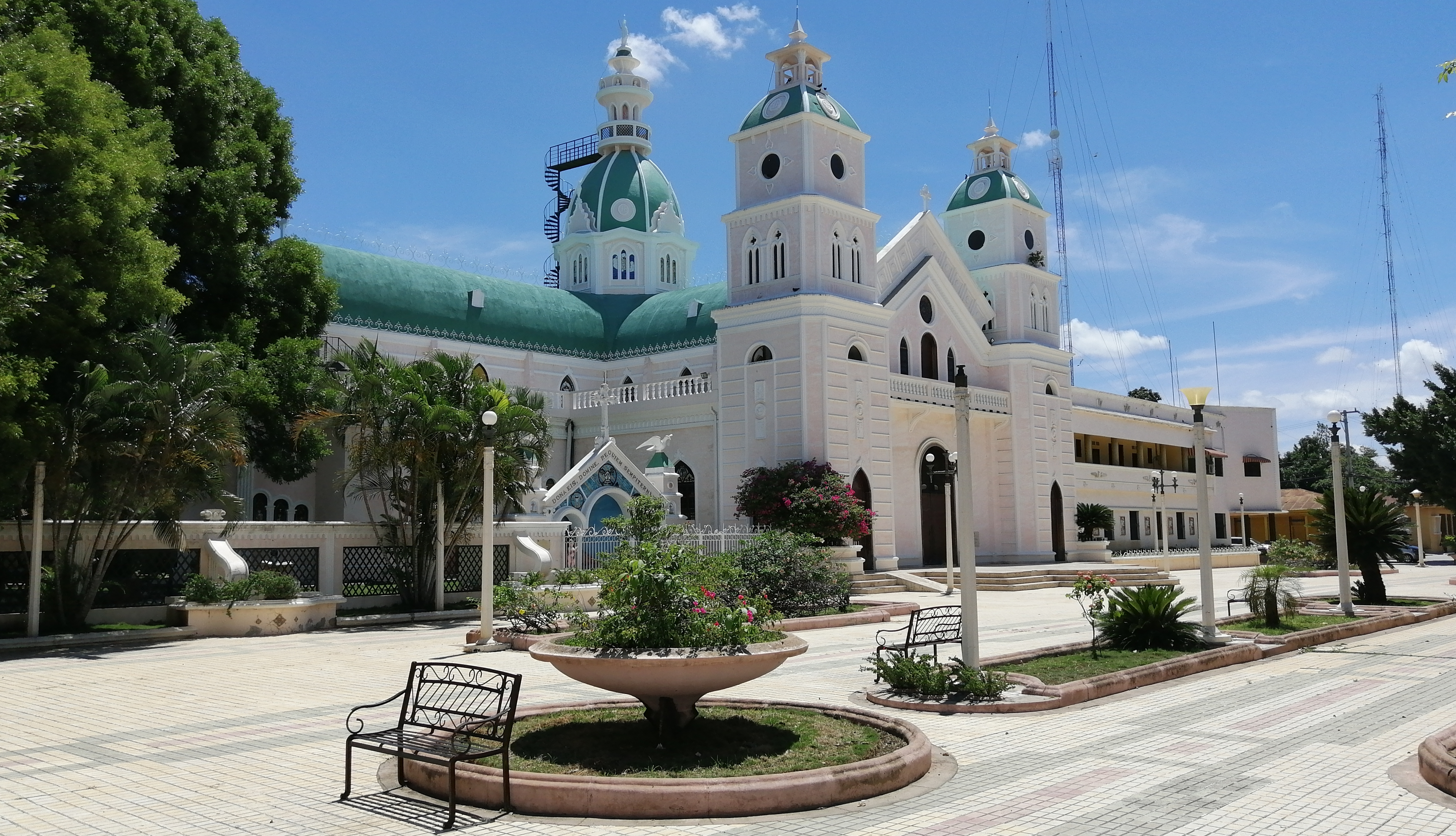
San Juan de la Maguana, Dominican Republic cathedral church.

In 1606, the people who were still scattered in the San Juan area, were transferred to Azua, leaving that landscape practically depopulated. It was not until the end of the 17th century that the repopulation of San Juan de la Maguana began. The eighteenth century was decisive for the development of this. In 1739 the population of the town barely reached 110 residents, according to a report made by Archbishop Domingo Álvarez. At the end of that century, this population already had about 4,500 inhabitants, according to Antonio Sánchez Valverde. The resurgence of the town of San Juan occurred in 1733, according to Carlos Esteban Deive in his book Las emigraciones Canarias a Santo Domingo. In this sense, this author says that the resurgence of San Juan "allowed the gathering of all the ranchers and farmers who lived scattered throughout the valley, who were joined by some neighbors from Azua." With regard to the population contribution of this last region, it is important to point out that after the earthquake of November 1751, families left to live in the San Juan Valley.

At the end of the 18th century, there was a real population boom in the area, as a consequence of the intense business with the French colony of Saint-Domingue. In the entire extension of the San Juan Valley, including areas that currently belong to the Elías Piña and Bánica province, there were about 25 thousand inhabitants, a population similar to that in the city of Santo Domingo and about a thousand inhabitants less than in Santiago, which was by then the most populated area in the country. It was in those times that places like Las Matas de Farfán and Pedro Corto were formed.

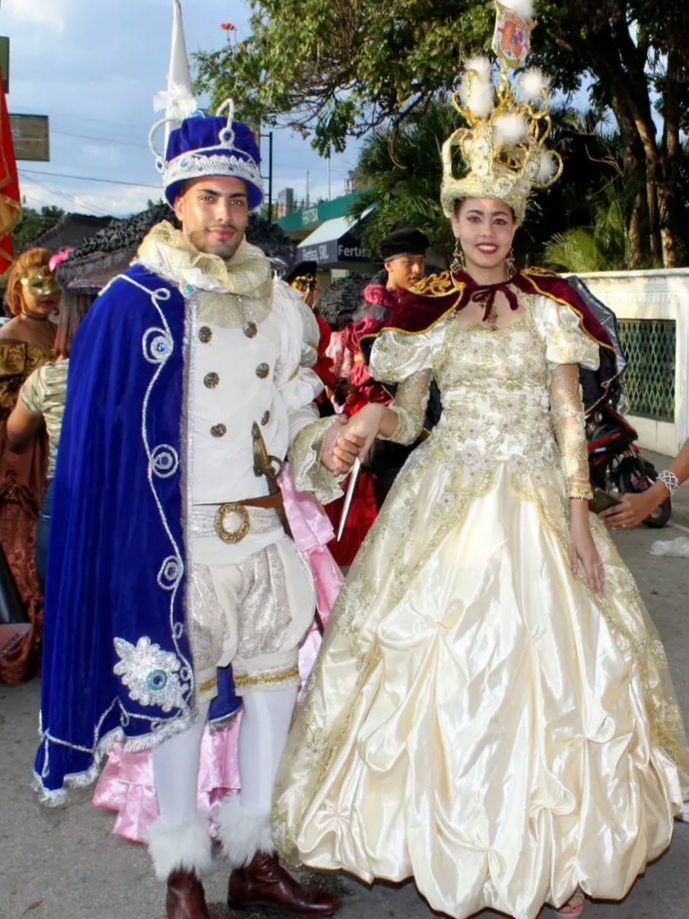
Dominican Republic carnival parade costumes in San Juan de la Maguana

Political and economic needs were mixed up when promoting the repopulation of the San Juan Valley. On the one hand, it was essential to create towns in the area to stop the advance of the French to the territories of the Spanish colony. In addition, it was no less true that the boom in economic activities in the French part of the island was a powerful magnet that attracted people to take advantage of the immense livestock wealth, cows, goats and horses that grazed without owners, in the immense valley, which always had a reputation for being a healthy place for people. In some reports of the time, written by travelers who visited the San Juan Valley area, such as the Frenchman Daniel Lescallier, it is said that in 1764 the village of San Juan was “quite important due to the large number of herds or cattle farms that they surround and by the multitude of cattle and horses that feed on the grass that grows naturally in their beautiful savannas. " Later on, Lescallier notes that in the valley there was no cultivation of any kind, which makes it clear that cattle ranching was its main economic activity.

== Economic activity ==
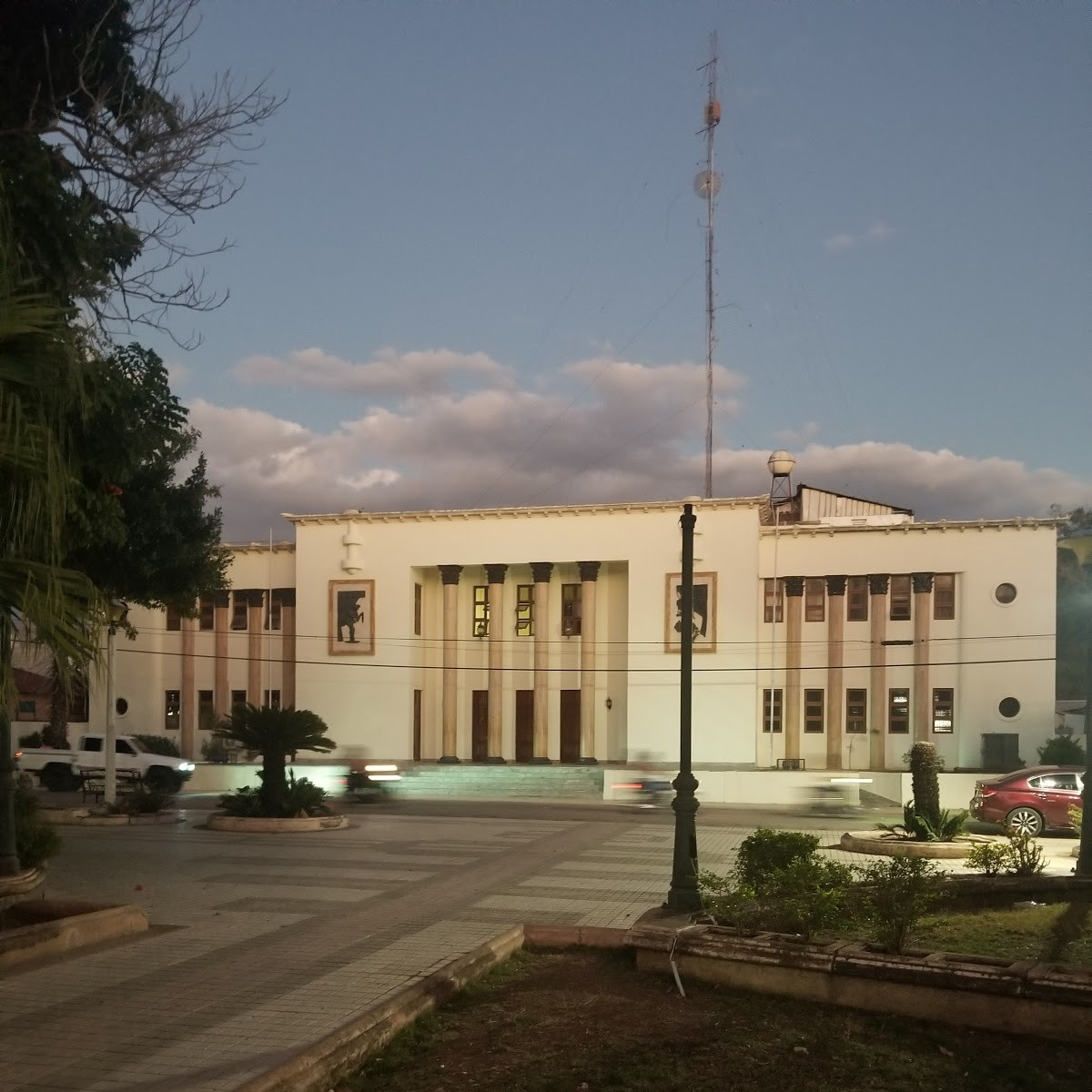
San Juan, Dominican Republic town street.

The economy of San Juan is traditionally based on livestock and agricultural activities. It has a significant production of grains such as rice, corn, peanuts, sorghum, string beans (beans), pigeon peas (Gandules), as well as cassava, sweet potatoes, onions and vegetables.

San Juan produces more than 90% of the beans, 84% of the peanuts, 31% of the corn, 35% of the pigeon pea, 20% of the onion, and 36% of the sweet potato consumed by the Dominican population. The growing dairy farming is the other economic activity that the region has developed, its milk is extracted and used to make different varieties of cheese and yogurt.

The province has excellent ecotourism potential, as it has the Pico Duarte, the San Juan Valley, the most extensive intramontane valley in the country, the Sabaneta, Sabana Yegua and Palomino Dams, the Indigenous Ceremonial Plaza and for sharing the Central Mountain Range and the Sierra de Neiba. In addition, there is currently a private local company Explomarca S.A., which extracts Travertine in La Trinchera, San Juan province.

Another source of income for residents are the various formal and informal businesses such as bakeries, tailors, clinical laboratories, medical offices, pharmacies, a market, hotels, galleries, bars and activities that have to do with transportation services, among others.

== Municipalities and municipal districts ==
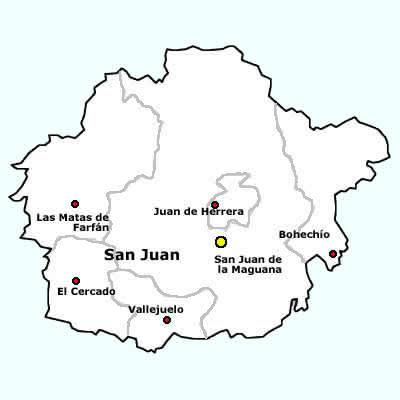
Municipalities of San Juan Province.

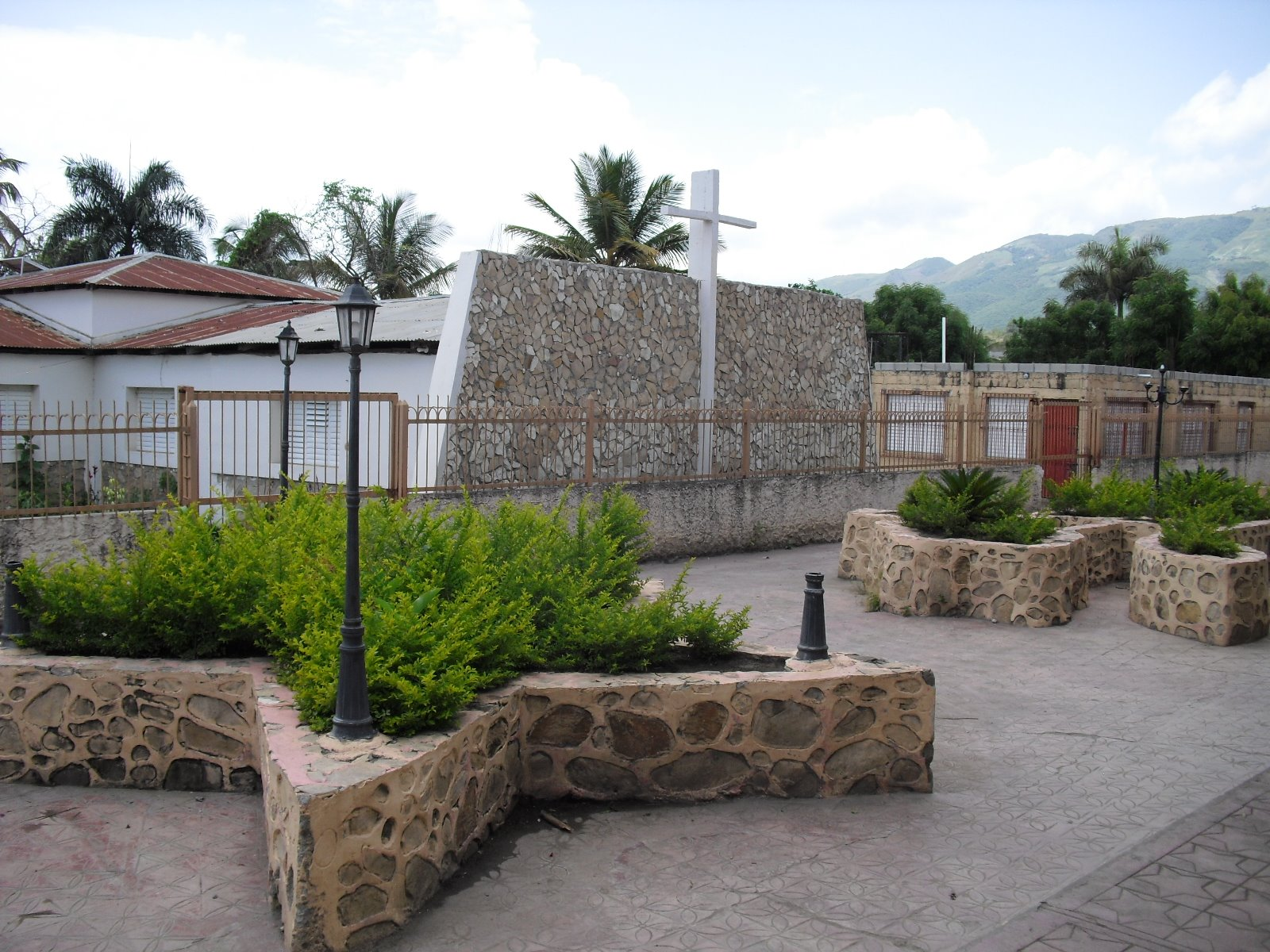
Vallejuelo.

The province as of June 20, 2006 is divided into the following municipalities (municipios) and municipal districts (distrito municipal - D.M.) within them:

- Bohechío
  - Arroyo Cano (D.M.)
  - Yaque (D.M.)
- El Cercado
  - Batista (D.M.)
  - Derrumbadero (D.M.)
- Juan de Herrera
  - Jinova (D.M.)
  - La Rubia (D.M)
- San Juan de la Maguana
  - El Rosario (D.M.)
  - Guanito (D.M.)
  - Hato del Padre (D.M.)
  - La Jagua (D.M.)
  - Las Maguanas (D.M.)
  - Las Charcas de Maria Nova (D.M.)
  - Pedro Corto (D.M.)
  - Sabana Alta (D.M.)
  - Sabaneta (D.M.)
- Las Matas de Farfán
  - Carrera de Yegua (D.M.)
  - Matayaya (D.M.)
- Vallejuelo
  - Jorjillo (D.M.)

The following is a sortable table of the municipalities and municipal districts with population figures as of the 2012 census. Urban population are those living in the seats (cabeceras literally heads) of municipalities or of municipal districts. Rural population are those living in the districts (Secciones literally sections) and neighborhoods (Parajes literally places) outside of them.

Name	Total population	Urban population	Rural population
Bohechío	9,652	4,208	5,444
El Cercado	25,688	2,585	23,103
Juan de Herrera	12,963	6,952	6,011
Las Matas de Farfán	70,586	35,054	35,532
San Juan de la Maguana	169,032	119,581	49,451
Vallejuelo	12,555	1,006	11,549
San Juan province	300,476	154,386	146,090

For comparison with the municipalities and municipal districts of other provinces see the list of municipalities and municipal districts of the Dominican Republic.
