= Miss Dominican Republic 2012 =

- Date: 17 April 2012
- Presenters: Luis Manuel Aguiló; Hony Estrella; Bolívar Valera; Nashla Bogaert
- Entertainment: El Cata; Cristian Daniel; Alex Matos; Ámbar
- Venue: Renaissance Auditorio de Festival del Hotel Jaragua, Santo Domingo, Dominican Republic
- Broadcaster: Antena Latina (Dominican Republic); Televisión Dominicana (U.S.)
- Entrants: 37
- Placements: 15
- Debuts: Com.Dom. Venezuela
- Winner: Carola Durán Baldera; La Vega (dethroned); Dulcita Lieggi; Distrito Nacional (successor)

Miss República Dominicana 2012 was held on 17 April 2012 at the Renaissance Auditorio de Festival del Hotel Jaragua in Santo Domingo, Dominican Republic.

The Miss República Dominicana 2012 represented the Dominican Republic in Miss Universe 2012.

The First Runner-Up entered Miss Continente Americano 2012. The Second Runner-Up entered Reina Hispanoamericana 2012. The Third Runner-Up entered Miss Globe International 2012. The Fourth Runner-Up entered Miss América Latina 2012. The winner was crowned by Dalia Fernández, Miss Dominican Republic 2011.

== Results ==
=== Placements ===
Placement	Contestant
Miss Dominican Republic 2012	La Vega – Carola Durán (dethroned)
1st Runner-Up	Distrito Nacional – Dulcita Lieggi (assumed)
2nd Runner-Up	Santiago – Carolyn Hawa
3rd Runner-Up	Peravia – Alondra Peña
4th Runner-Up	San José de Ocoa – Luz Quezada
Top 10	Monseñor Nouel – Yildry Peña; María Trinidad Sánchez – Liza Blanco; Santo Domingo Norte – Yudelsi de Raben; San Pedro de Macorís – Yolenny Mora; Com. Dom. EEUU – Nathalie Muñoz
Top 15	Santiago Rodríguez – Eliangy Rosario; Samaná – Verónica Batista; Duarte – Karen Yapoort §; Dajabón – Marilyn Rivas; Hermanas Mirabal – Lia Jiménez

§ – Voted into the Top 15 by viewers

== Candidates ==
Represents	Candidates	Age	Height	Hometown
Azua	Zaldy Díaz Espinal	20	1.71 m (5 ft 7 1/2 in)	Azua de Compostela
Bahoruco	Jessica Hidalgo Cruz	21	1.66 m (5 ft 5 1/2 in)	Santiago de los Caballeros
Barahona	Elizabeth Ibañéz Reyes	23	1.80 m (5 ft 11 in)	Santa Cruz de Barahona
Com. Dom. En Estados Unidos	Nathalie Muñoz Santos	18	1.71 m (5 ft 7 1/2 in)	New York City
Com. Dom. En Puerto Rico	Vanessa Myint López	21	1.80 m (5 ft 11 in)	Bayamón
Com. Dom. En Venezuela	Karen Luna Peguero	24	1.88 m (6 ft 2 in)	Caracas
Dajabón	Marlyn Elanny Rivas Ramírez	18	1.80 m (5 ft 11 in)	Dajabón
Distrito Nacional	Dulcita Lynn Lieggi Francisco	22	1.75 m (5 ft 9 in)	Santo Domingo
Duarte	Karen Yapoort Evangelista	23	1.76 m (5 ft 9 1/2 in)	San Francisco de Macorís
El Seibo	Yirell Acosta Mercedes	23	1.76 m (5 ft 9 1/2 in)	Santa Cruz de El Seibo
Elías Piña	Massiel Teresa Jiménez Tejada	21	1.76 m (5 ft 9 1/2 in)	Comendador
Espaillat	Katherine Polanco Echenique	26	1.78 m (5 ft 10 in)	Moca
Hato Mayor	Laura Margarita Guzmán Rodríguez	18	1.73 m (5 ft 8 in)	Moca
Hermanas Mirabal	Lia Jiménez Batista	24	1.69 m (5 ft 6 1/2 in)	Santiago de los Caballeros
Independencia	Laura Peña Rodríguez	20	1.83 m (6 ft 0 in)	Santo Domingo
La Altagracia	Scarlet Hernández Vásquez	25	1.69 m (5 ft 6 1/2 in)	Santo Domingo
La Romana	Jennifer García Cáceres	21	1.69 m (5 ft 6 1/2 in)	La Romana
La Vega	Carola Durán Baldera	25	1.82 m (5 ft 11 1/2 in)	Concepcion de la Vega
María Trinidad Sánchez	Liza Mariel Blanco García	18	1.75 m (5 ft 9 in)	Nagua
Monseñor Nouel	Yildry Stefany Peña Bonifacio	21	1.86 m (6 ft 1 in)	Bonao
Monte Cristi	Ámbar Cabrera Duarte	23	1.81 m (5 ft 11 1/2 in)	Santiago de los Caballeros
Monte Plata	Francia Mercedes Santana Cruz	24	1.72 m (5 ft 7 1/2 in)	San Pedro de Macorís
Pedernales	Yolaine Santiago Iglesias	23	1.70 m (5 ft 7 in)	Santo Domingo
Peravia	Alondra Peña Pacheco	22	1.82 m (5 ft 11 1/2 in)	Baní
Puerto Plata	Paloma Massiel Almonte Reynoso	23	1.70 m (5 ft 7 in)	San Felipe de Puerto Plata
Samaná	Verónica Batista Caroles	21	1.79 m (5 ft 10 1/2 in)	Santiago de los Caballeros
San Cristóbal	Ilia Miriam Molina Mejía	23	1.80 m (5 ft 11 in)	San Cristóbal
San José de Ocoa	Luz Mariel Quezada Báez	22	1.76 m (5 ft 9 1/2 in)	San José de Ocoa
San Juan	Pamela Fernández Mesa	20	1.74 m (5 ft 8 1/2 in)	San Juan de la Maguana
San Pedro de Macorís	Yolenny Mora Medina	23	1.83 m (6 ft 0 in)	San Pedro de Macorís
Sanchez Ramírez	Emilin de Dolores Castillo Mejía	24	1.70 m (5 ft 7 in)	Santo Domingo
Santiago	Carolyn Andreina Hawa Rodríguez	23	1.73 m (5 ft 8 in)	Santiago de los Caballeros
Santiago Rodríguez	Eliangy Rosario Núñez	21	1.78 m (5 ft 10 in)	San Ignacio de Sabaneta
Santo Domingo Este	Mabel Alessandra Báez Vásquez	23	1.76 m (5 ft 9 1/2 in)	Santo Domingo
Santo Domingo Norte	Yudelsi de Raben Díaz	25	1.73 m (5 ft 8 in)	Santo Domingo
Santo Domingo Oeste	Ericka Indhira Santana Campusano	19	1.77 m (5 ft 9 1/2 in)	Santo Domingo
Valverde	Angelly Anés Guillén Goméz	19	1.72 m (5 ft 7 1/2 in)	Santo Domingo

== Other pageant notes ==
=== Replacements ===
- Comunidad Dominicana en Estados Unidos: Nathalie Muñoz was appointed as Miss Comunidad Dominicana en Estados Unidos after Mio Almonte was dethroned for undisclosed reasons.
