= Carola Durán =

Dominican model

- Born: Carlina Altagracia Durán Baldera; January 17, 1987 (age 39); Concepción de La Vega, Dominican Republic
- Education: BA in Culinary Arts at Pontificia Universidad Católica Madre y Maestra
- Occupations: Model and Chef
- Height: 1.87 m (6 ft 2 in)
- Beauty pageant titleholder
- Title: Miss Dominican Republic 2012
- Hair color: Brown
- Eye color: Hazel
- Major competitions: Reina Nacional de la Belleza República Dominicana 2011 (1st Runner-Up); Miss Tourism Queen International; Miss Dominican Republic 2012 (Winner) (Dethroned); Nuestra Belleza Latina 2013 (Top 18)
- Website: http://carlinaduran.com/

Carlina Durán Baldera (born January 17, 1987, in Concepción de La Vega) is a Dominican model who won the national crown of Miss Dominican Republic 2012, initially giving her the right to compete in Miss Universe 2012 representing her country in December 2012. After representing her home province of La Vega in the 2012 Miss Dominican Republic, Carola was crowned by Miss Dominican Republic 2011 Dalia Fernandez. She later got dethroned for admitting she had been married in 2009.

== Biography ==
Durán was a culinary student in the city of Santiago de los Caballeros, where she graduated at Pontificia Universidad Católica Madre y Maestra. She first started modeling at the age of 15. Her first pageant was Miss World La Vega, and was able to compete in the Reina Nacional de la Belleza República Dominicana 2011, in which she placed as first runner up. Being a finalist in the contest RNB allowed her to enter Miss Tourism Queen International where she did not place.

== Miss Dominican Republic 2012 ==
Durán competed as a representative of the province of La Vega, being one of 37 candidates in the country of Dominican Republic in the national beauty contest, Miss Dominican Republic 2012, broadcast live from Santo Domingo on April 17, 2012, where she was crowned the winner, earning the right to represent the Dominican Republic in Miss Universe 2012.

The first runner-up is Dulcita Lieggi from the Distrito Nacional, who was to represent the Dominican Republic in the contest of Miss Continente Americano 2012 in Ecuador. The second runner-up, Carolyn Hawa from Santiago, will represent the Dominican Republic in the contest of Reina Hispanoamericana 2012 in Bolivia. The third runner-up was Alondra Peña of Peravia and the fourth runner-up was Luz Quezada of San José de Ocoa.

On April 24, 2012, exactly one week after she won the crown, Carola was dethroned due to the fact that she was once married according to the MDR organization.

== Nuestra Belleza Latina 2013 ==
On February 4, 2013, Carlina auditioned for the beauty pageant/reality show Nuestra Belleza Latina 2013 in Miami, FL. She was selected by judge Osmel Souza to be in his group and be part of the Top 30 girls. On March 24, 2013, after weeks of competition she advanced to the Top 18. However, the following week on March 31, 2013, she didn't receive enough votes from the viewers and was eliminated from the competition.

Awards and achievements
Preceded by Dalia Fernández	Miss Dominican Republic; 2012 (Dethroned)	Succeeded by Dulcita Lieggi (Successor)
