= La Vega, Dominican Republic =

La Vega
- Municipality
- Concepción de la Vega (Real)
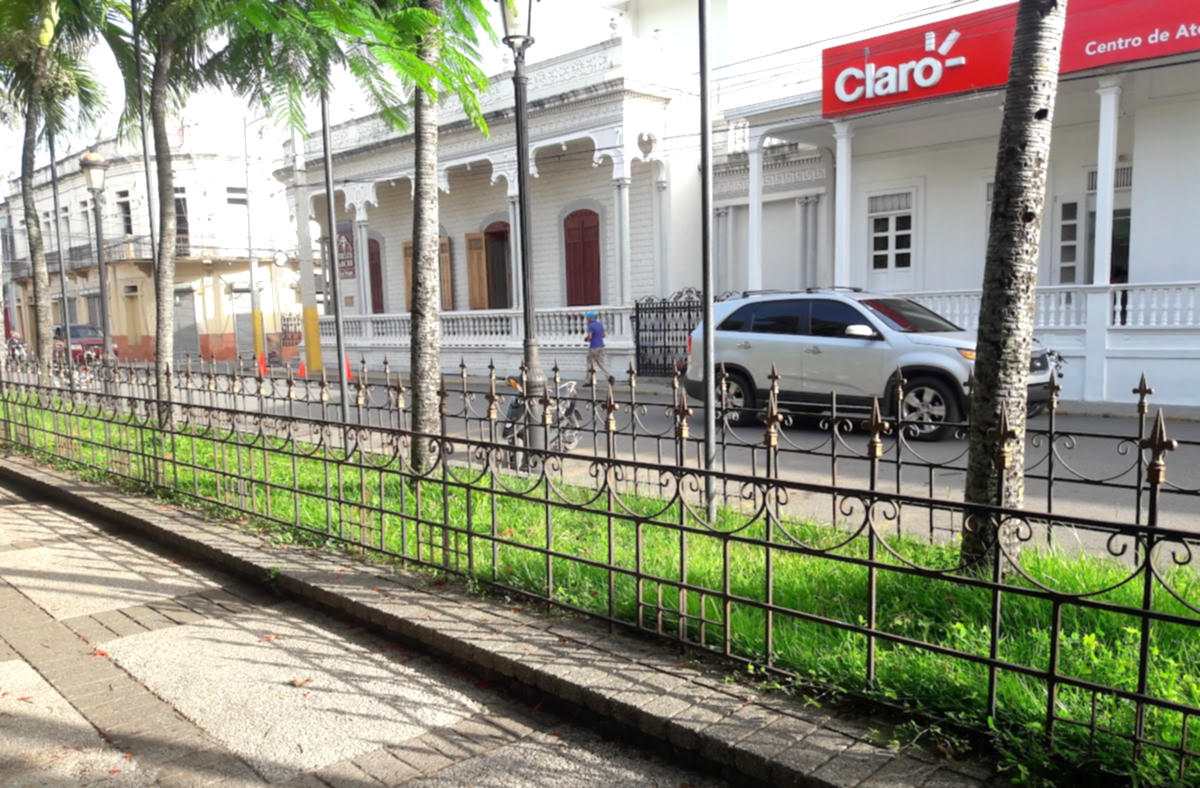
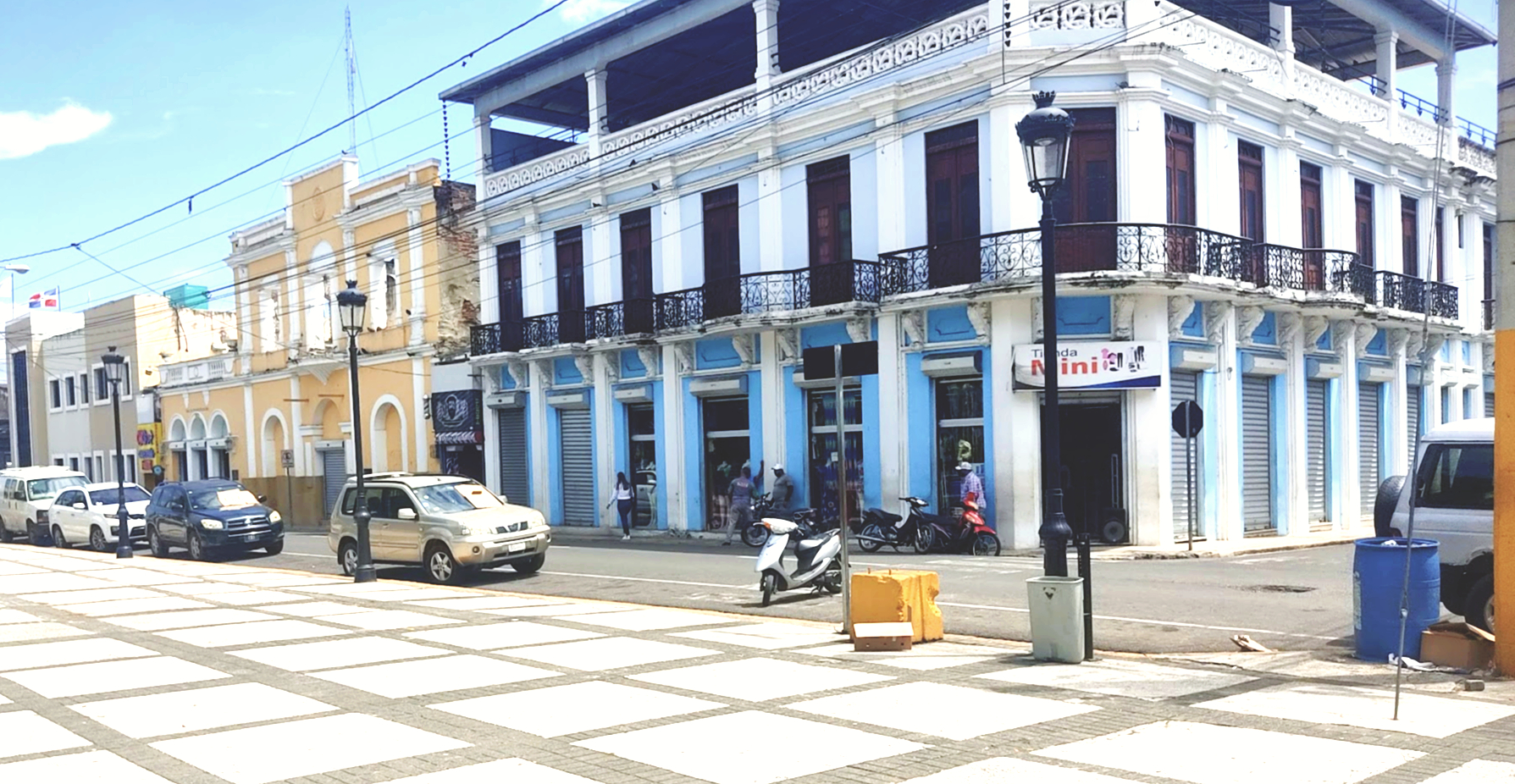
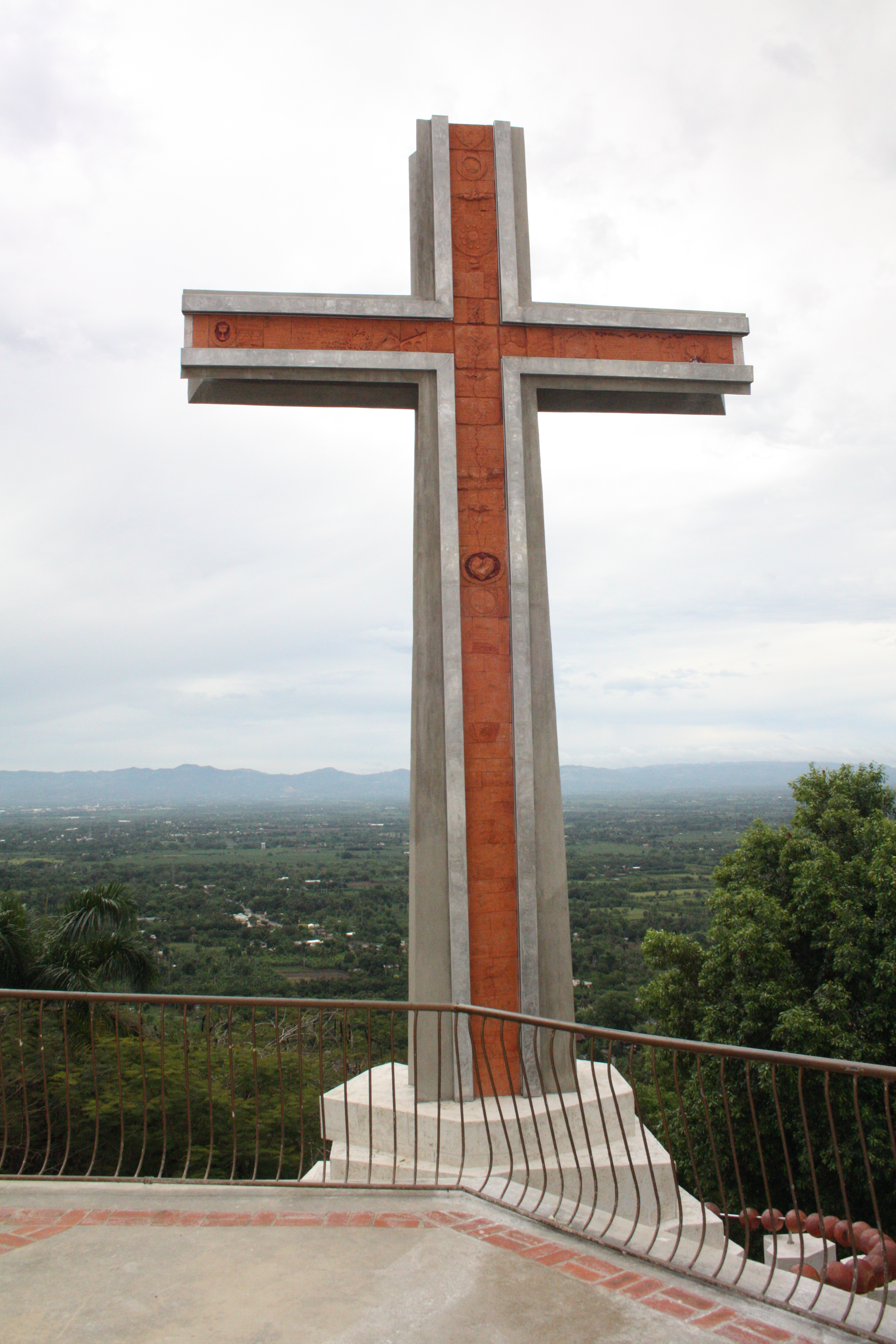
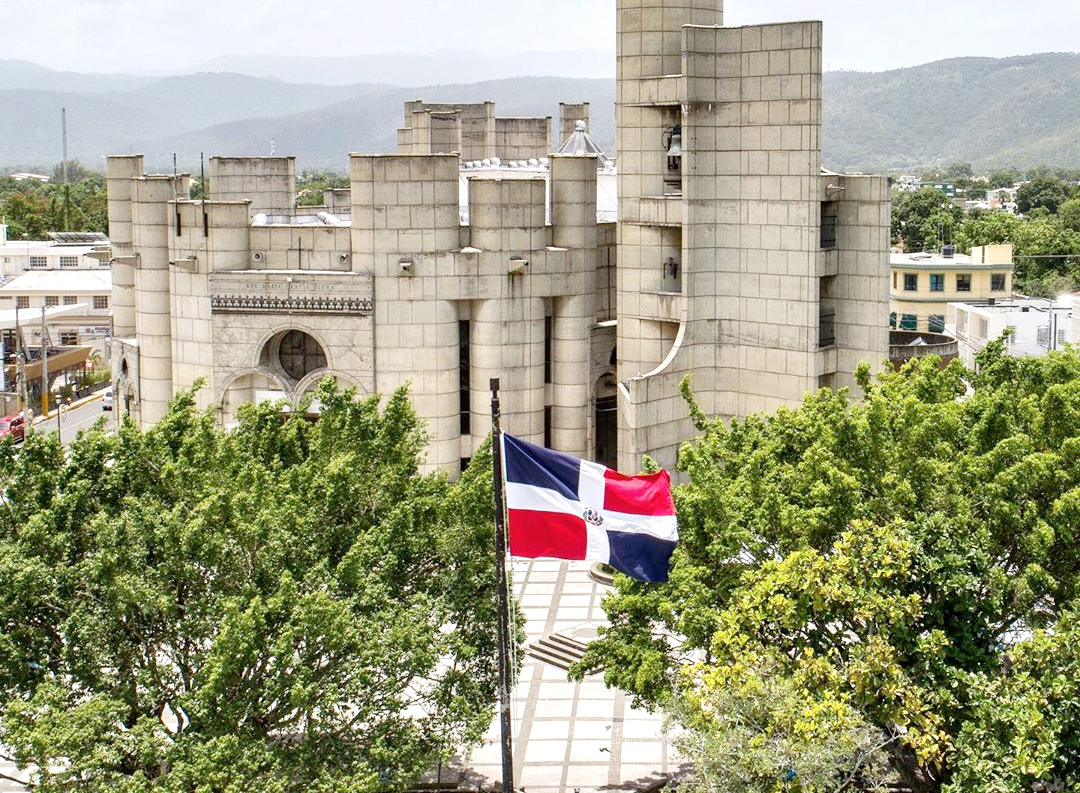
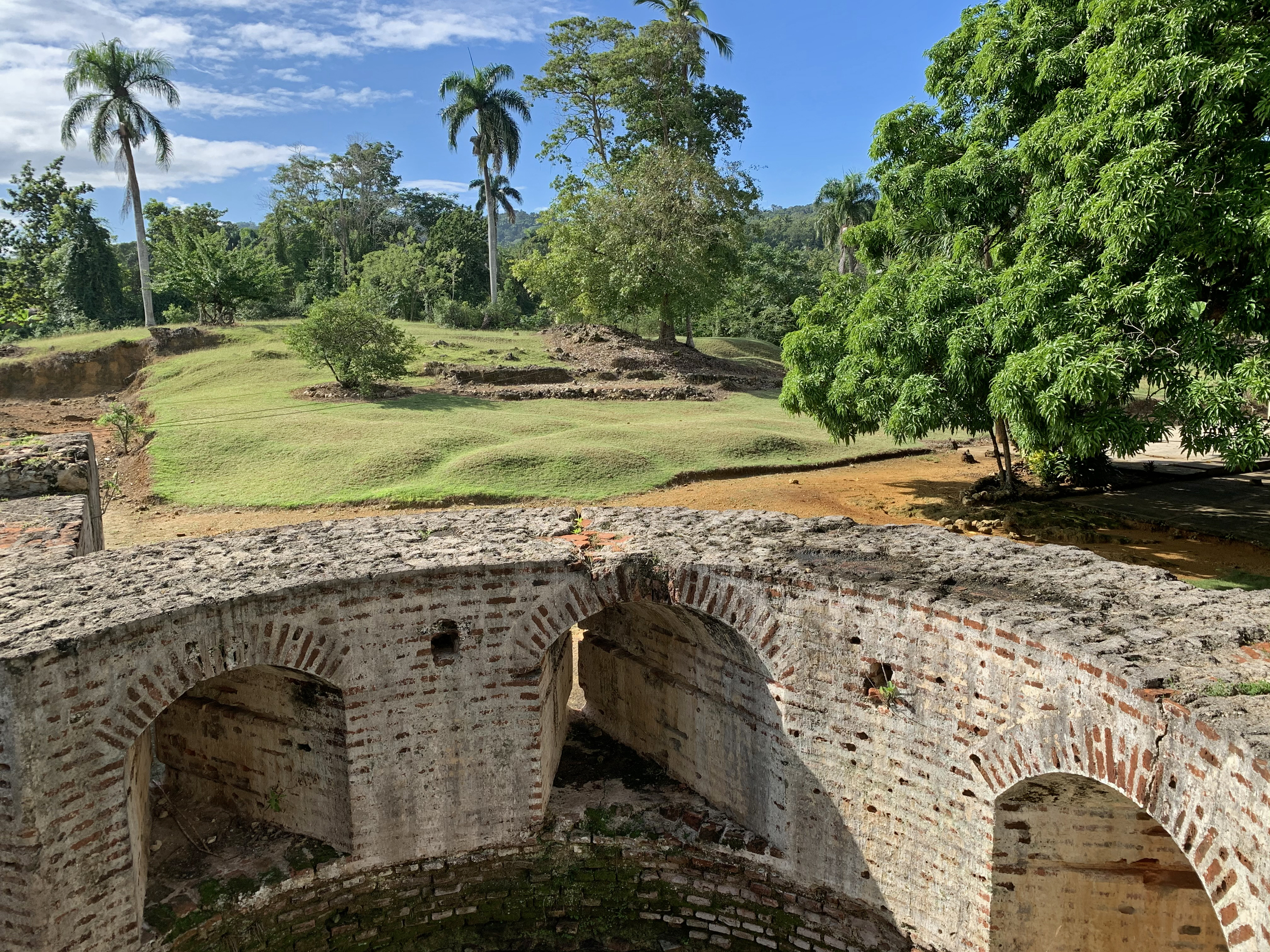
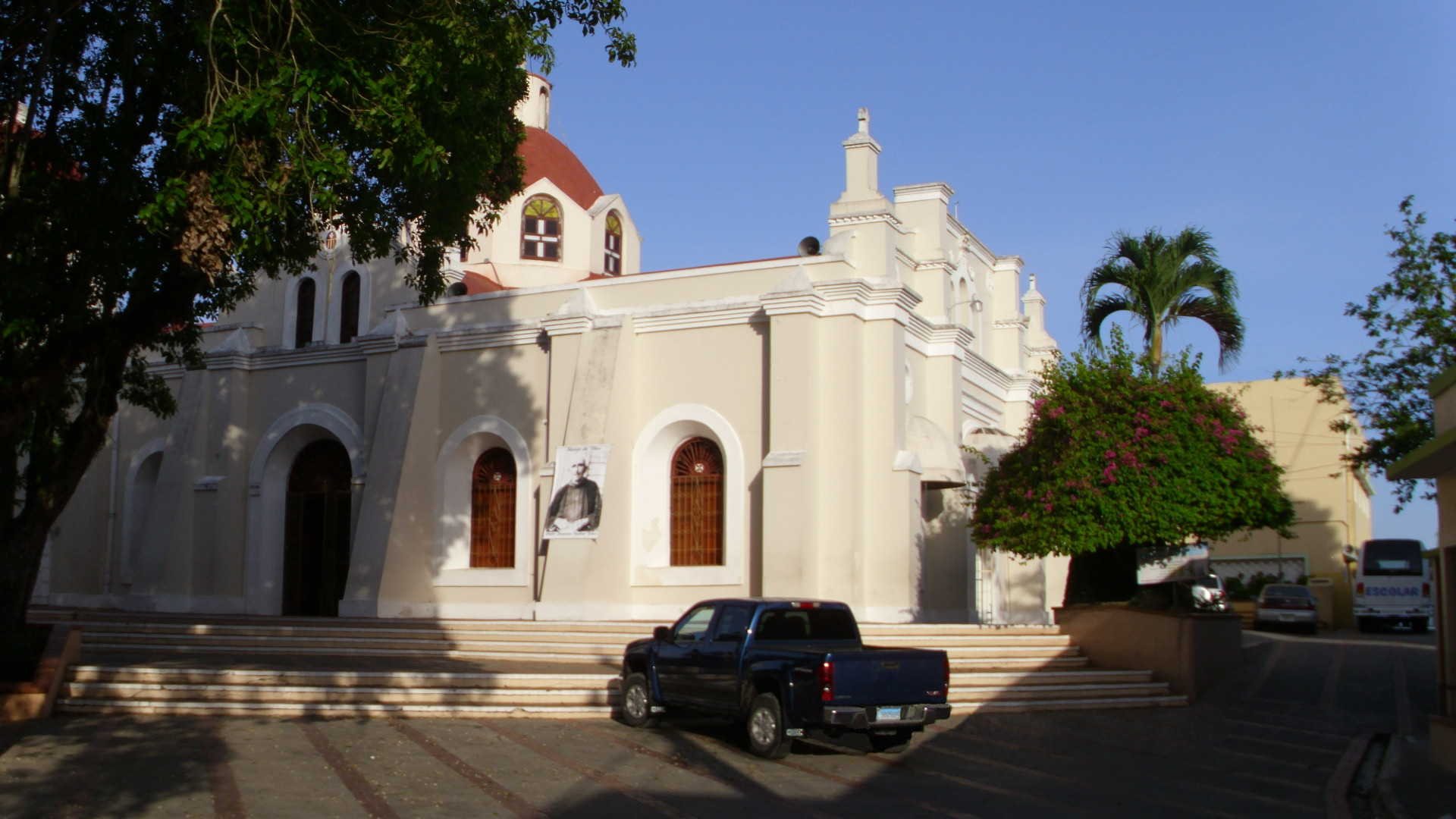
- View of La Vega city, Dominican Republic

- Coat of arms

- Location within the Dominican Republic
- Coordinates: 19°13′12″N 70°31′48″W
- Country: Dominican Republic
- Province: La Vega
- Municipal Districts: 3
- Founded: 1494
- Municipality since: 1844

Area
  - Total: 410.9 km^{2} (158.6 sq mi)
  - Urban: 30.71 km^{2} (11.86 sq mi)
- Elevation: 100 m (330 ft)

Population (2014)
  - Total: 202,864
  - Density: 493.7/km^{2} (1,279/sq mi)
  - Urban: 104,536
- Demonyms: Vegano (female, vegana)
- Time zone: UTC-4 (AST)
  - Summer (DST): UTC-4 (AST)
- Distance: 36 km (22 mi) to Santiago; 125 km (78 mi) to Santo Domingo

La Vega, officially Concepción de la Vega (Real), is the third most populous city and a municipality of the Dominican Republic. It is the provincial capital of the homonymous province. The city is known as the Carnival epicenter of the Dominican Republic for its tradition and culture, its large agricultural production methods throughout its province.

== History ==
Concepción de la Vega (Real) was the first settlement in its province, having been founded in 1495 by Batholomew Columbus at the foot of a fortress built by his brother, Christopher Columbus in 1494, which was intended to guard the route to the interior gold deposits of the Cibao Valley. This Spanish settlement gradually grew around the fort. The name of the city honors and refers to the Immaculate Conception of the Blessed Virgin Mary, which in Spanish is commonly shortened to "Concepción"; and "la Vega" refers to the "plain" in which it is sited. Either the city itself or the antecedent fortress was founded on 8 December, this being the date of the Catholic feast of the Immaculate Conception. After 1508, when gold was found in quantity there, Concepción became the first gold boomtown in the island. It already had a cathedral, two convents, a hospital, and several administrative buildings. The first coin was minted in La Vega, and the first merchants settled there.

By 1510 it was one of the largest and most important European cities in the hemisphere. The city was destroyed and buried by an earthquake on December 2, 1562, and the survivors moved to the present site on the banks of the Camú River. The second foundation of the city corresponds to its current location and it is believed that it took place between the years 1562 and 1563. In the days of National Independence, the city of La Vega joined the cause of freedom with soldiers. On March 4, 1844, La Vega formalized its declaration in support of the War of Independence, and that same day it became the first town in the country to raise the national flag.

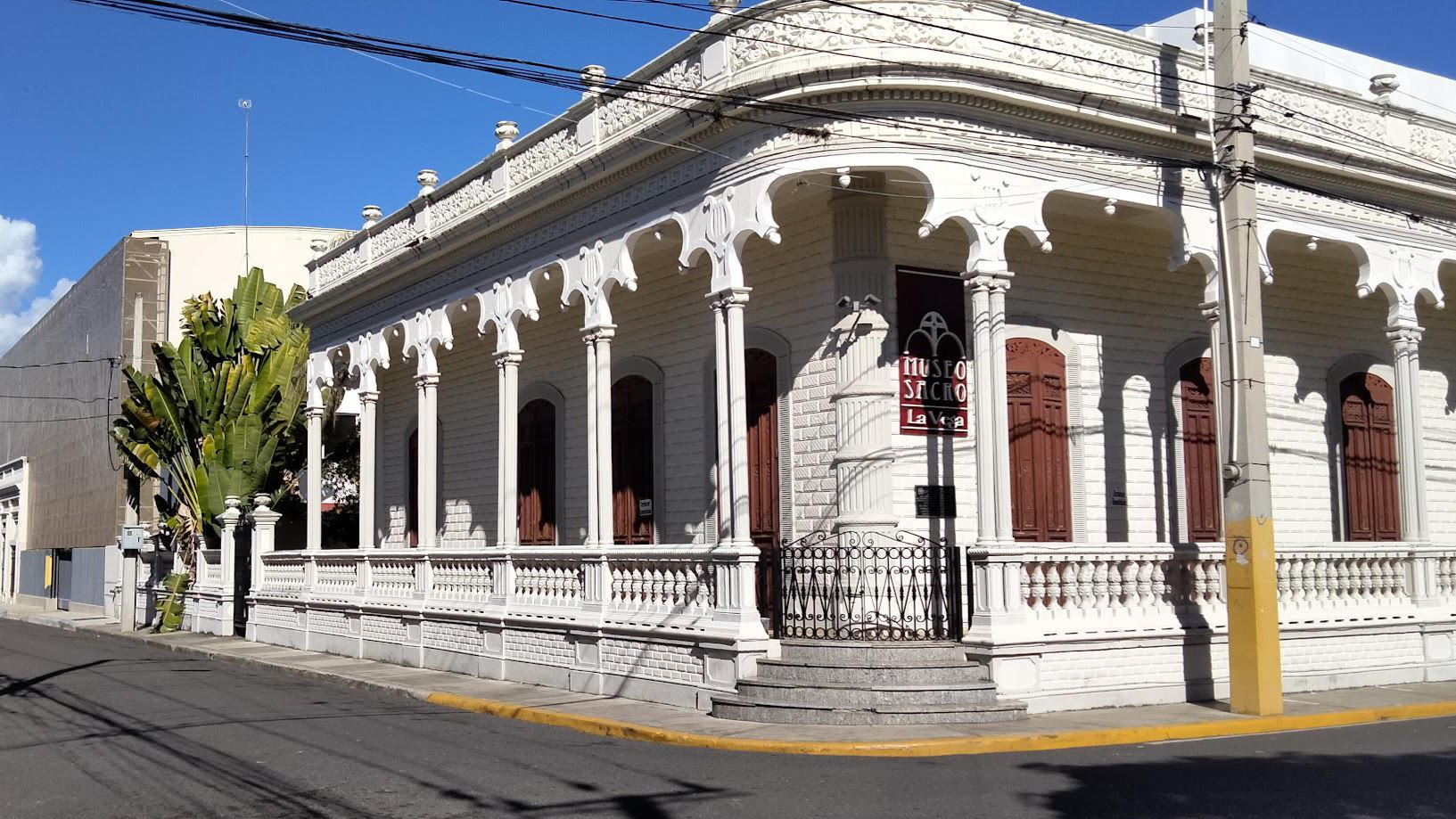
Colonial architecture in LA Vega Dominican Republic downtown streets.

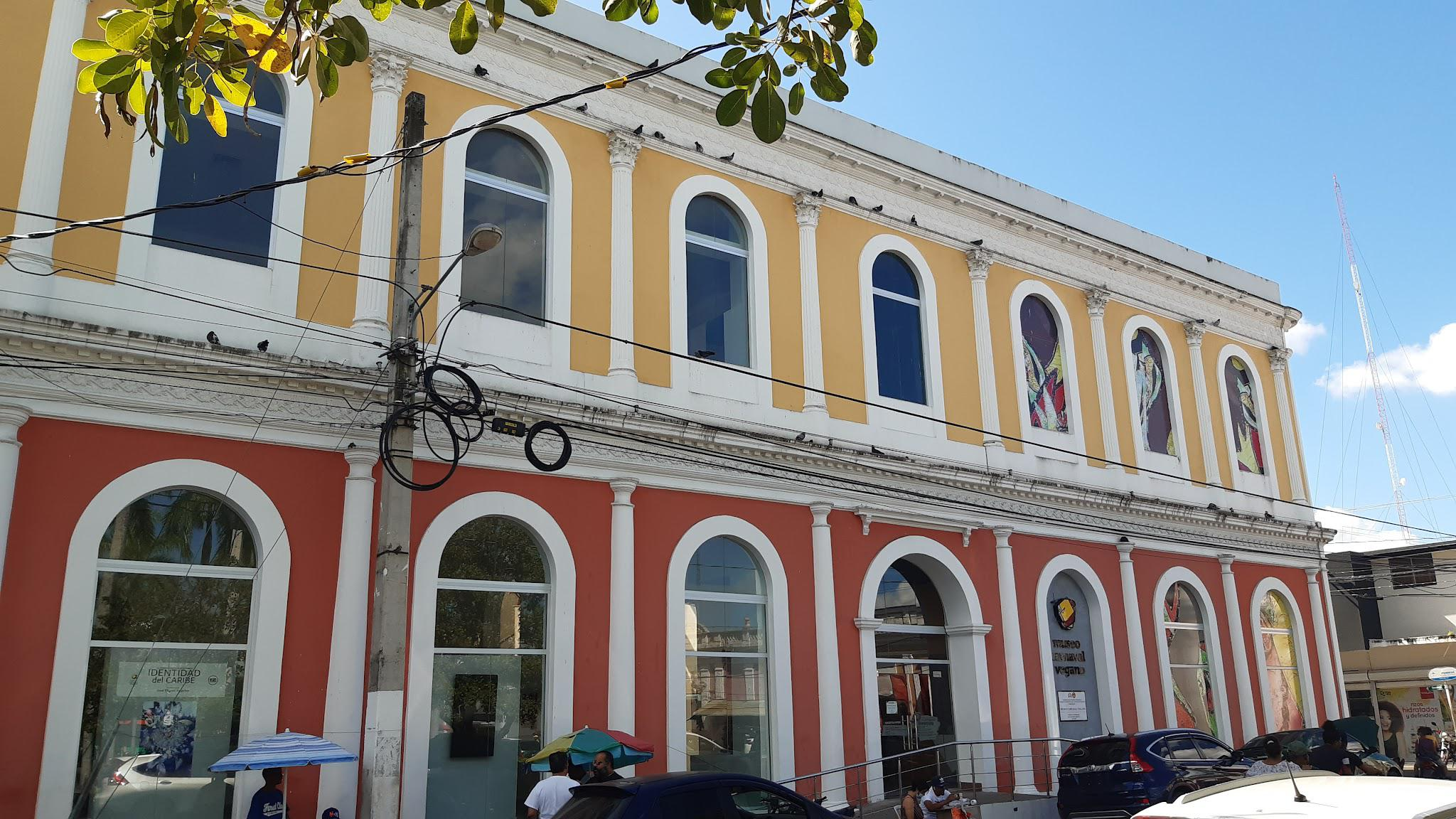
Colonial architecture in La Vega Dominican Republic downtown streets.

Commerce, agriculture, and industry gained new momentum in the late 1800s and early 1900s. An event that strengthened the area's economic development was the inauguration of the railway between the port of Sánchez and the city of La Vega. The transport by this means of fruits and merchandise led to new living conditions, with settlers arriving from Santo Domingo, Santiago, Moca, and other places. The La Vega region today yields cacao, coffee, tobacco, rice, fruits, and cattle. The first theater in the country was also built in La Vega. In 1915, the city received the name of a cultured city due to its art and culture. In the place of the ruins of the first city, there is an archaeological park and a museum, the Pueblo Viejo National Park. Over the years, a town called Pueblo Viejo emerged in honor of being the first place where the city existed.

== Geography ==
La Vega is bounded on the north by the Camú River. This river flows about 100 kilometers before emptying into Yuna River. South of the city is the Cordillera Central, the largest mountain system of the Dominican Republic. El Ponton Field, a local airport, bounds the city on the east. To La Vega's west are the Camú River again and Montellano.

== Climate ==
La Vega has a tropical rainforest climate (Köppen: Af) The city averages around 1,357 mm (53 in) of rainfall a year. The highest temperature ever recorded was 38.6 °C (101 °F) on October 6, 1979.

Climate data for Concepción de la Vega (1991–2020 averages, extremes 1961–present)
Month	Jan	Feb	Mar	Apr	May	Jun	Jul	Aug	Sep	Oct	Nov	Dec	Year
Record high °C (°F)	36.2 (97.2)	36.2 (97.2)	37.2 (99.0)	37.3 (99.1)	38.0 (100.4)	38.0 (100.4)	37.5 (99.5)	38.5 (101.3)	38.4 (101.1)	38.6 (101.5)	37.2 (99.0)	35.0 (95.0)	38.6 (101.5)
Mean daily maximum °C (°F)	28.9 (84.0)	30.0 (86.0)	30.6 (87.1)	31.1 (88.0)	31.7 (89.1)	32.8 (91.0)	32.8 (91.0)	32.8 (91.0)	32.8 (91.0)	31.7 (89.1)	29.4 (84.9)	28.9 (84.0)	31.2 (88.2)
Mean daily minimum °C (°F)	18.9 (66.0)	18.9 (66.0)	19.4 (66.9)	20.6 (69.1)	21.7 (71.1)	21.7 (71.1)	21.7 (71.1)	21.7 (71.1)	21.7 (71.1)	20.6 (69.1)	20.6 (69.1)	19.4 (66.9)	20.6 (69.1)
Record low °C (°F)	11.0 (51.8)	14.0 (57.2)	12.5 (54.5)	14.0 (57.2)	17.0 (62.6)	17.0 (62.6)	16.0 (60.8)	15.0 (59.0)	16.0 (60.8)	17.2 (63.0)	16.2 (61.2)	14.0 (57.2)	11.0 (51.8)
Average rainfall mm (inches)	99.3 (3.91)	57.9 (2.28)	81.3 (3.20)	100.8 (3.97)	118.6 (4.67)	121.9 (4.80)	137.2 (5.40)	142.2 (5.60)	137.2 (5.40)	95.8 (3.77)	114.3 (4.50)	150.9 (5.94)	1,357.4 (53.44)
Average rainy days (≥ 1.0 mm)	9.0	7.1	6.4	8.8	11.5	10.3	11.4	12.1	11.8	10.5	11.0	11.1	121.0
Average relative humidity (%)	73.6	72.5	69.6	71.5	74.3	71.5	71.3	70.7	70.6	74.7	77.6	77.1	72.9
Mean monthly sunshine hours	186.7	185.8	213.9	201.5	206.5	228.7	246.2	250.7	210.7	207.2	174.5	156.3	2,468.7
Source: NOAA

== Sectors ==
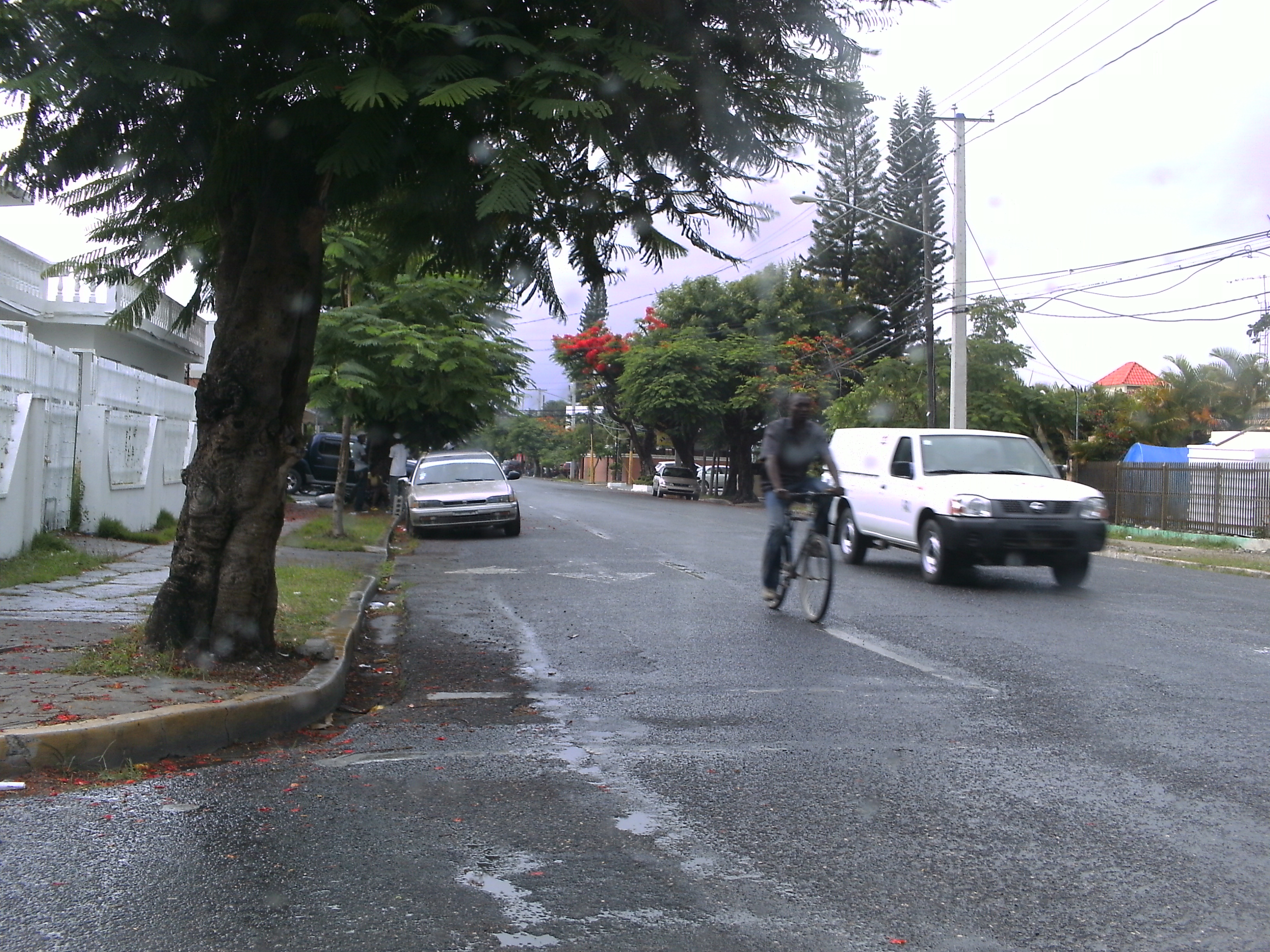
Centro Ciudad sector

- Arenoso (surrounding areas)
- Brache Batista
- Barrio Guarionex
- Barrio Loteria
- Barrio Militar
- Barrio X
- Bayacanes (surrounding areas)
- Carmelitas
- Camboya
- Centro Ciudad (Margarita)
- Conani
- Cutupú (surrounding areas)
- Don Bosco
- Don Pedro
- El Bolsillo
- El Paraiso
- El Campito
- El Cerro (surrounding areas)
- El Ensueño
- El Napoles
- El Riito
- Ensanche Duarte
- Gamundi
- Guaigui (surrounding areas)
- La Arboleda
- La Boca Del Lobo
- Las Carolinas
- La Enramada
- La Cigua
- La Planta
- La Riviera
- Las Marias
- Licey (surrounding areas)
- Los Pomos
- Los Robles
- Los Multi-Familiares (Viejos y Nuevos)
- Palmarito
- Parque Hostos
- Ponton
- Puerto Rico
- Rancho Abajo (surrounding areas)
- Residencial Chimbin
- Residencial Coral
- Río Verde Abajo (surrounding areas)
- Río Verde Arriba (surrounding areas)
- San Antonio
- San Martin
- San Miguel
- Santo Domingo Sabio
- Soto (surrounding areas)
- Villa Carolinas
- Villa Olga
- Villa Francisca
- Villa Francisca II
- Villa Margarita
- Villa Mera
- Villa Real
- Villa Hollywood
- Villa Lora
- Villa Rosa
- Zafaraya

== Government of Vega ==
Person	Occupation	Political Party
Kelvin Cruz	Mayor	PRM
Amparo Custodio	Vice Mayor	PRM
Lourdes Margarita Alvarado	Governor	PLD
Rogelio Genao	Senator	PRSC
TBD	Deputy	TBD
TBD	Deputy	TBD
TBD	Deputy	TBD
Agustin Burgos	Deputy	PRM
Fausto Ruiz Valdez	Deputy	PRM
TBD	Deputy	TBD

== Economy ==
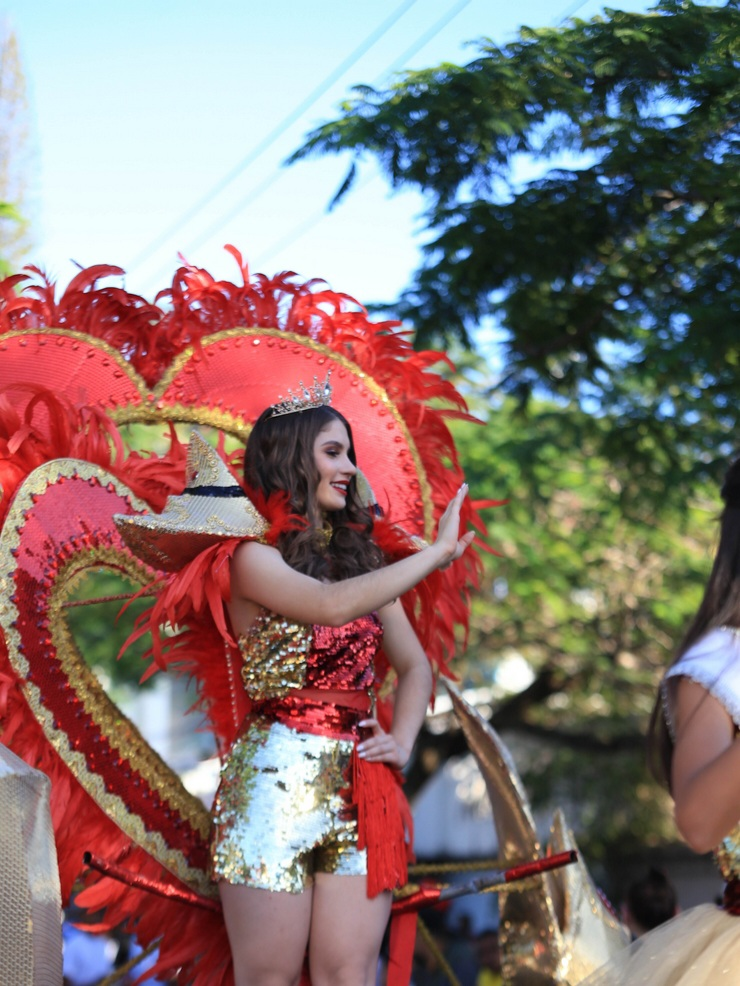
Carnival of La Vega, Dominican Republic.

The local industries are based upon cacao, coffee, tobacco, rice, and cattle production. There is also a small but very famous brewery called Cervecería Vegana known for its pilsener-style beers, named Quisqueya and Soberana. There is a factory known for making the famous sausage Induveca.

== Religion ==
The shrine of Our Lady of Mercy called Santo Cerro is located in the place where Virgin Mary appeared to Christopher Columbus during a battle.

== Education ==
There is an extension of the Universidad Nacional Pedro Henríquez Ureña and there is the Universidad Católica Tecnológica del Cibao. Since 2005 the national and local governments are planning to build an extension of the Universidad Autónoma de Santo Domingo, but there are some conflicts and the project is behind schedule. This city also has one of the most expensive schools in the country, the famous Colegio Agustiniano, which is the only in the country.

=== Private, public, and high schools ===
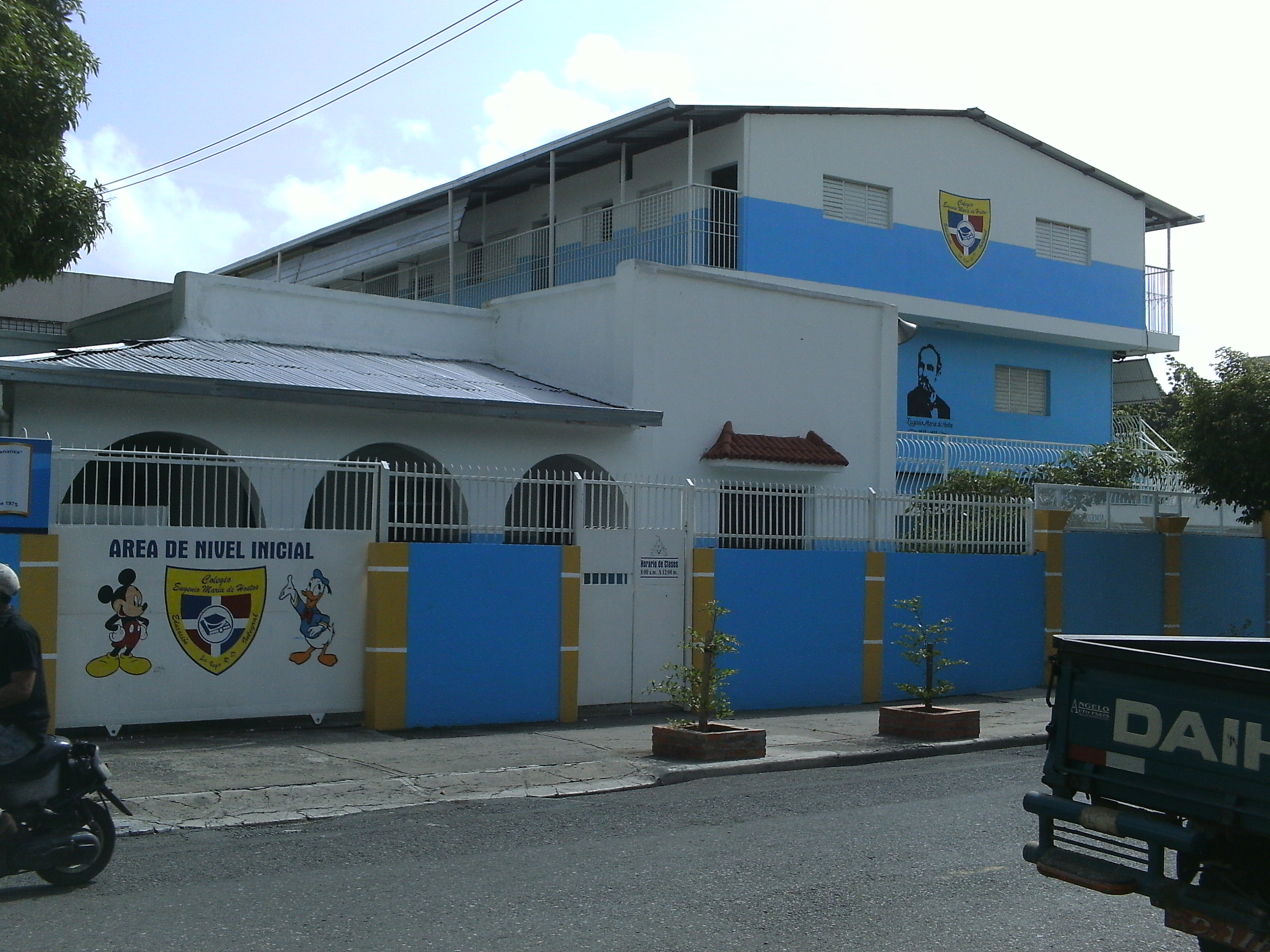
Eugenio María de Hostos School

Private schools & High schools	Public schools & High schools
Colegio Agustiniano	Arenoso School
Cardenal Sancha	Don Pepe Alvarez High School
La Vega Christian School	Del Carmen School
Don Luis Despradel	Garcia Godoy
Eugenio Maria De Hostos	Politécnico Femenino Mercedes Morel
Immacualada Concepción	Mitila Grullón
Nuveluz Elementary Private School	Laura Vicuña
Padre Fantino Bilingual School	Padre Lamarche
Santo Tomás De Aquino	San Miguel Elementary School
U.N.P.H.U.	San Antonio Public school
Vega Nueva	San Martín De Porres

=== The Book Fair ===
Annually, the famous Feria del Libro de República Dominicana (Dominican Republic Book Fair) takes place in the city of La Vega. In this fair most of the famous books and literary works from Dominicans writers such as Juan Bosch, Joaquín Balaguer, w:es:Federico García Godoy, among others, and international writers such as Gabriela Mistral, Rubén Darío, Gabriel García Márquez, among others, are sold, and some theatrical works are shown to the public. The fair is celebrated each year in the month of September, lasting about one week, and brings to this city all the editors from all around the country, selling many kinds of books, theatrical works, etc.

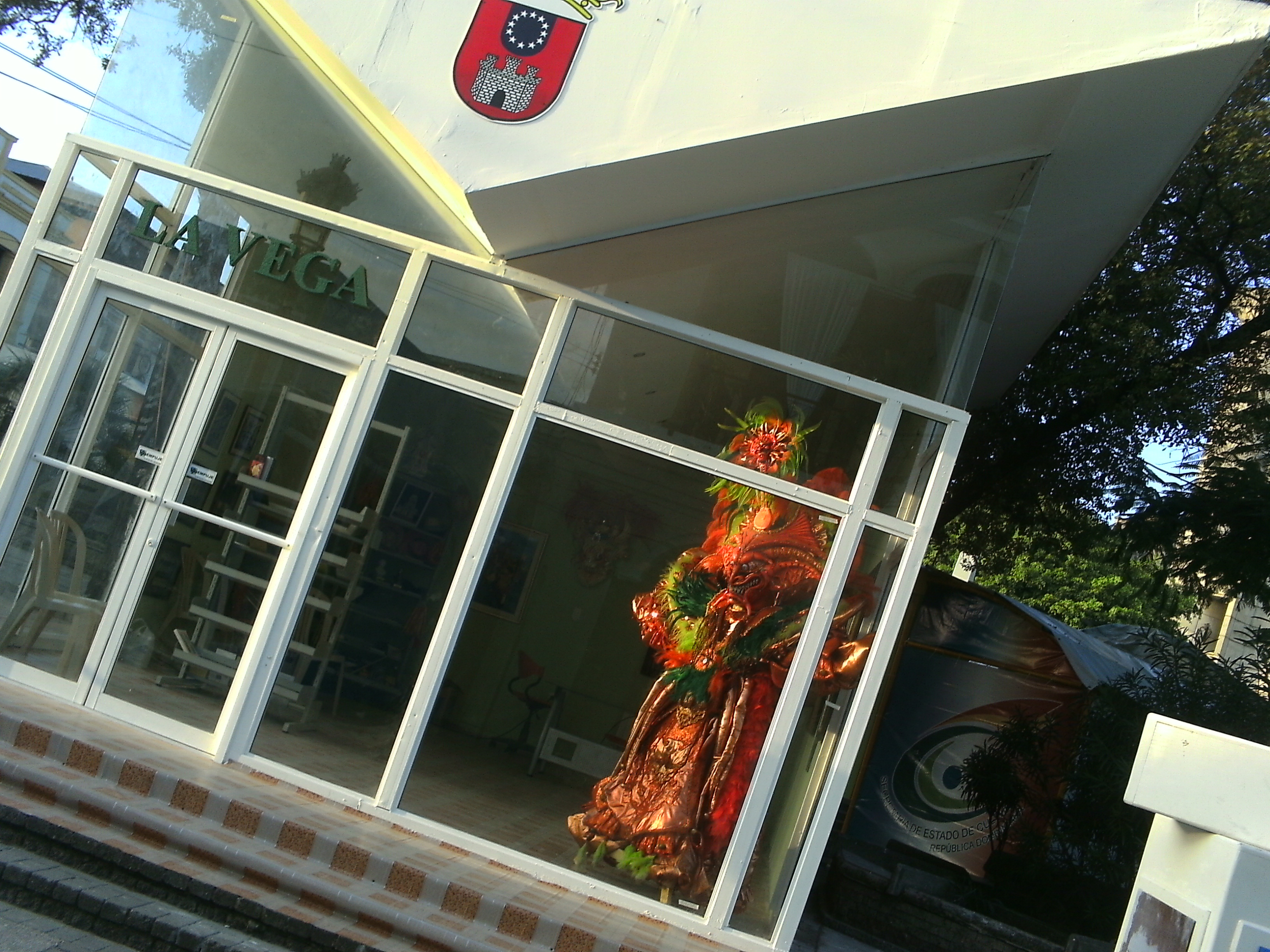
Concepción de La Vega section

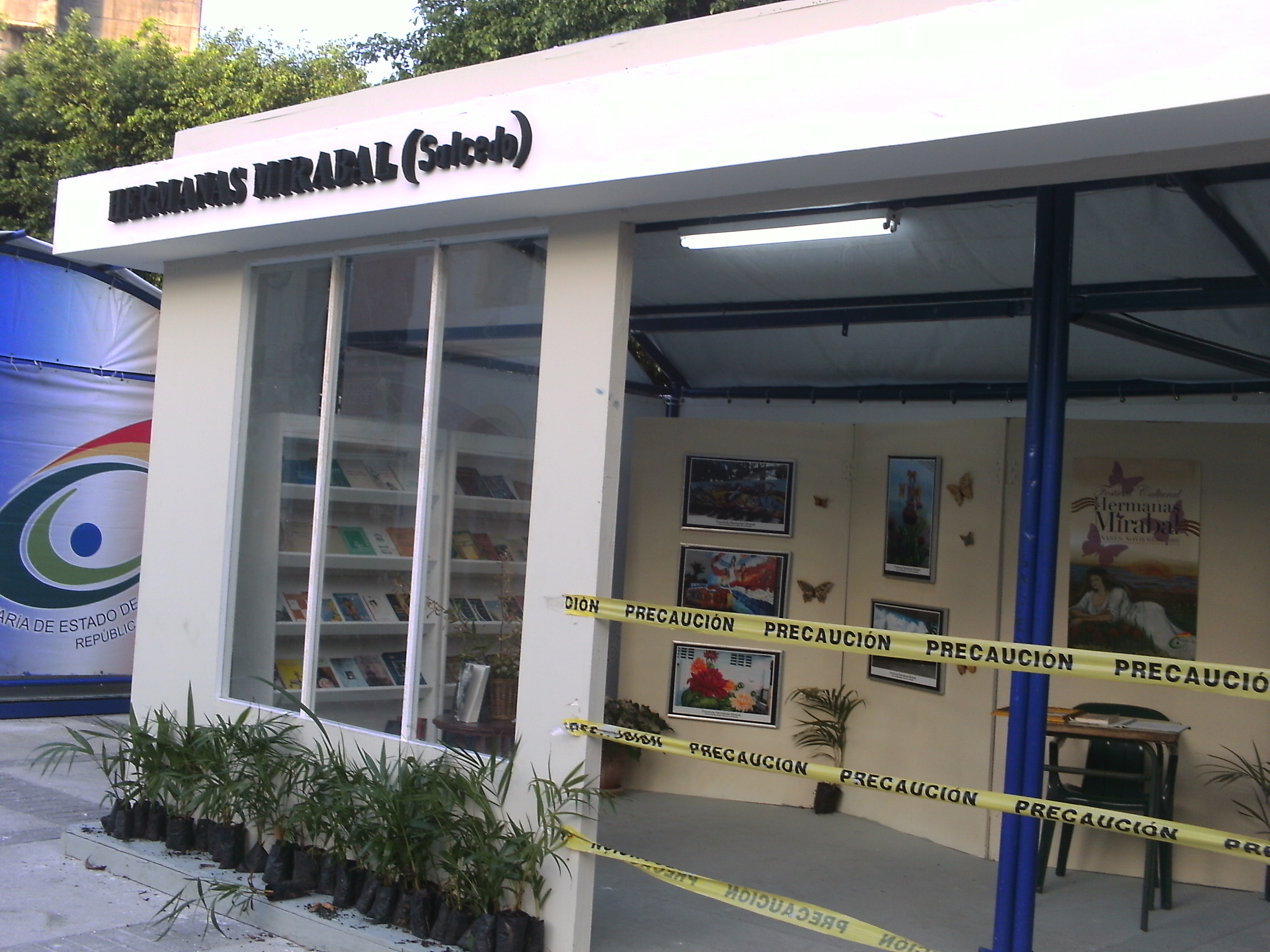
Hermanas Mirabal section

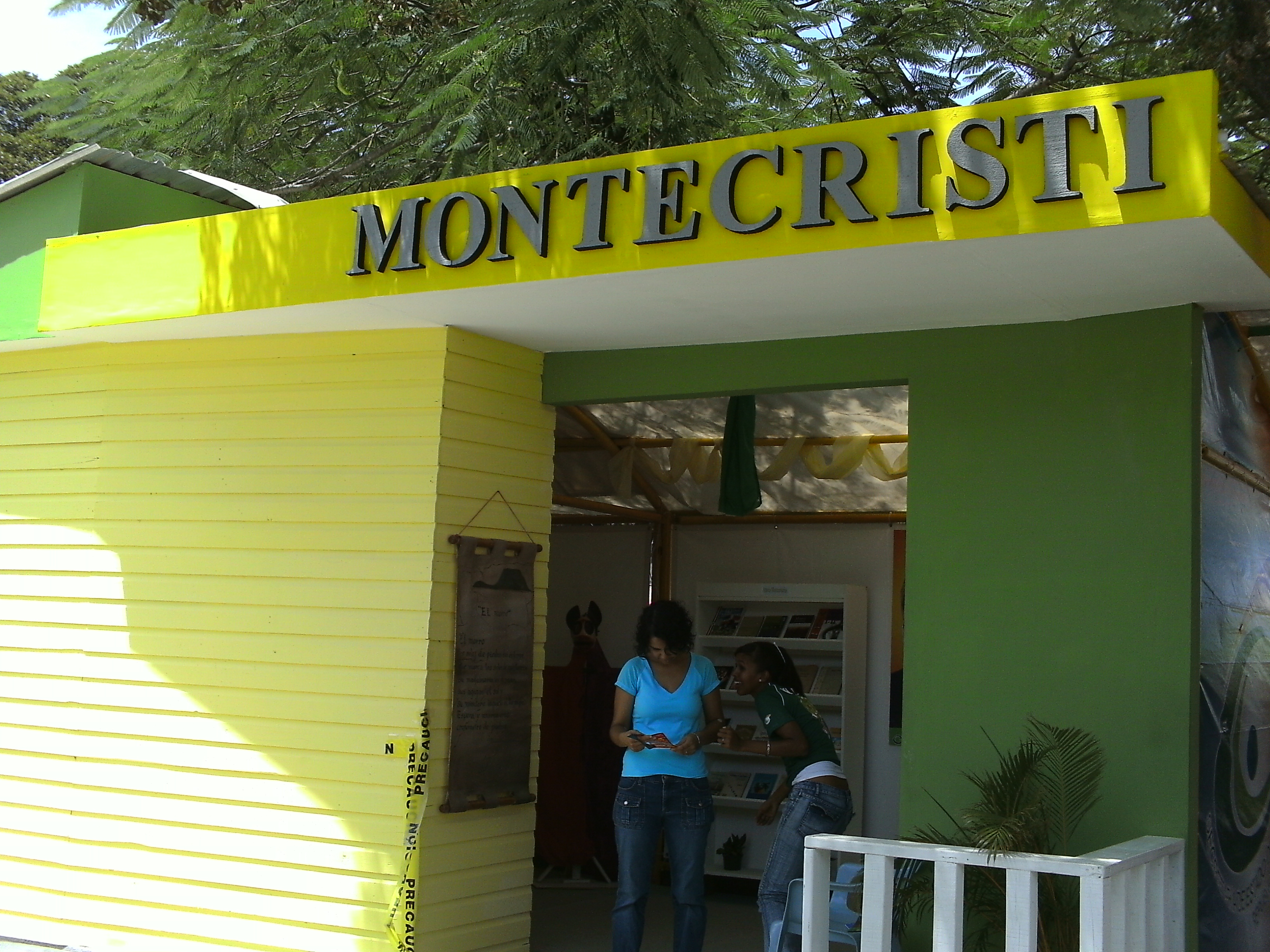
Monte Cristi section

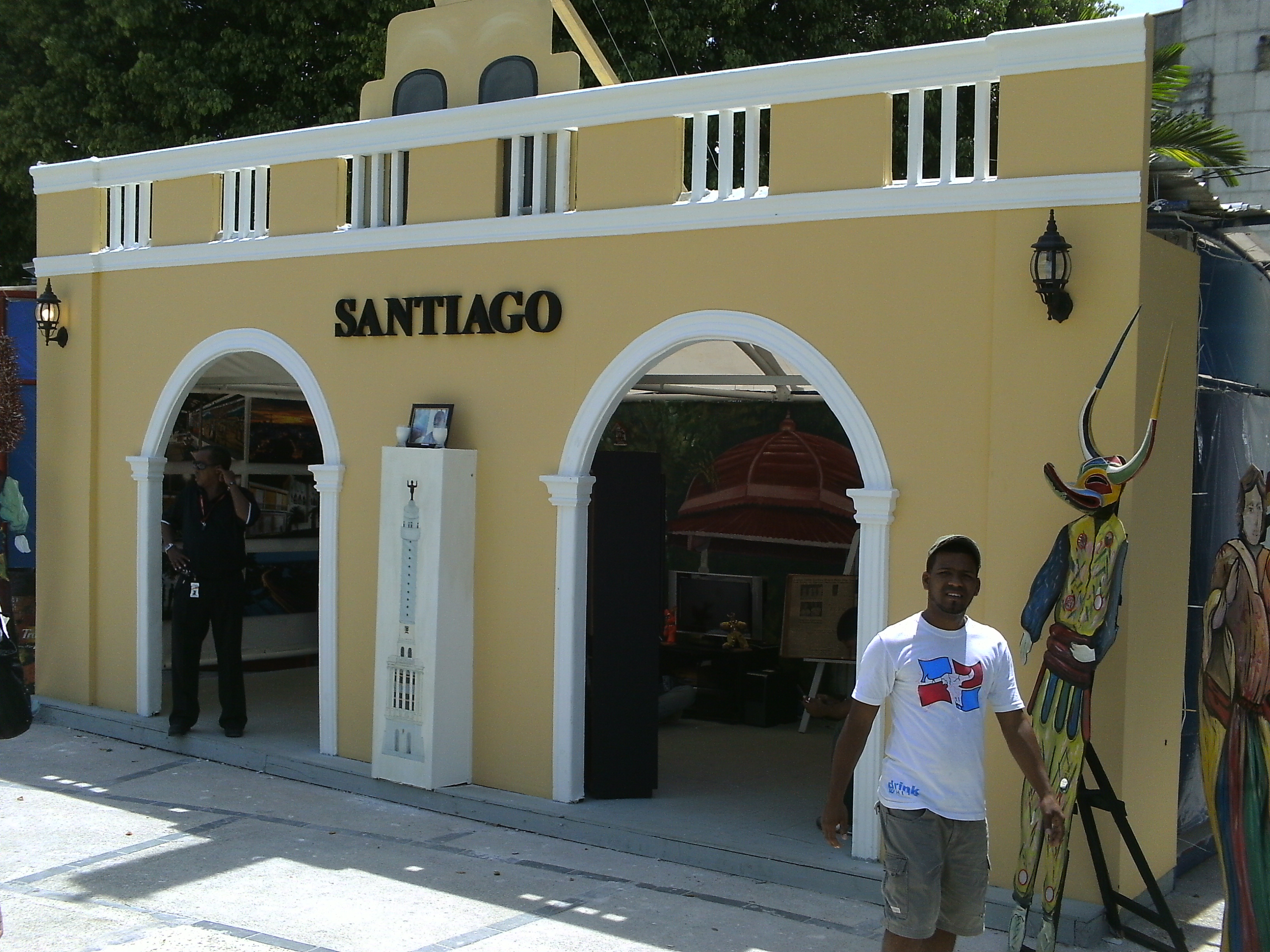
Santiago section

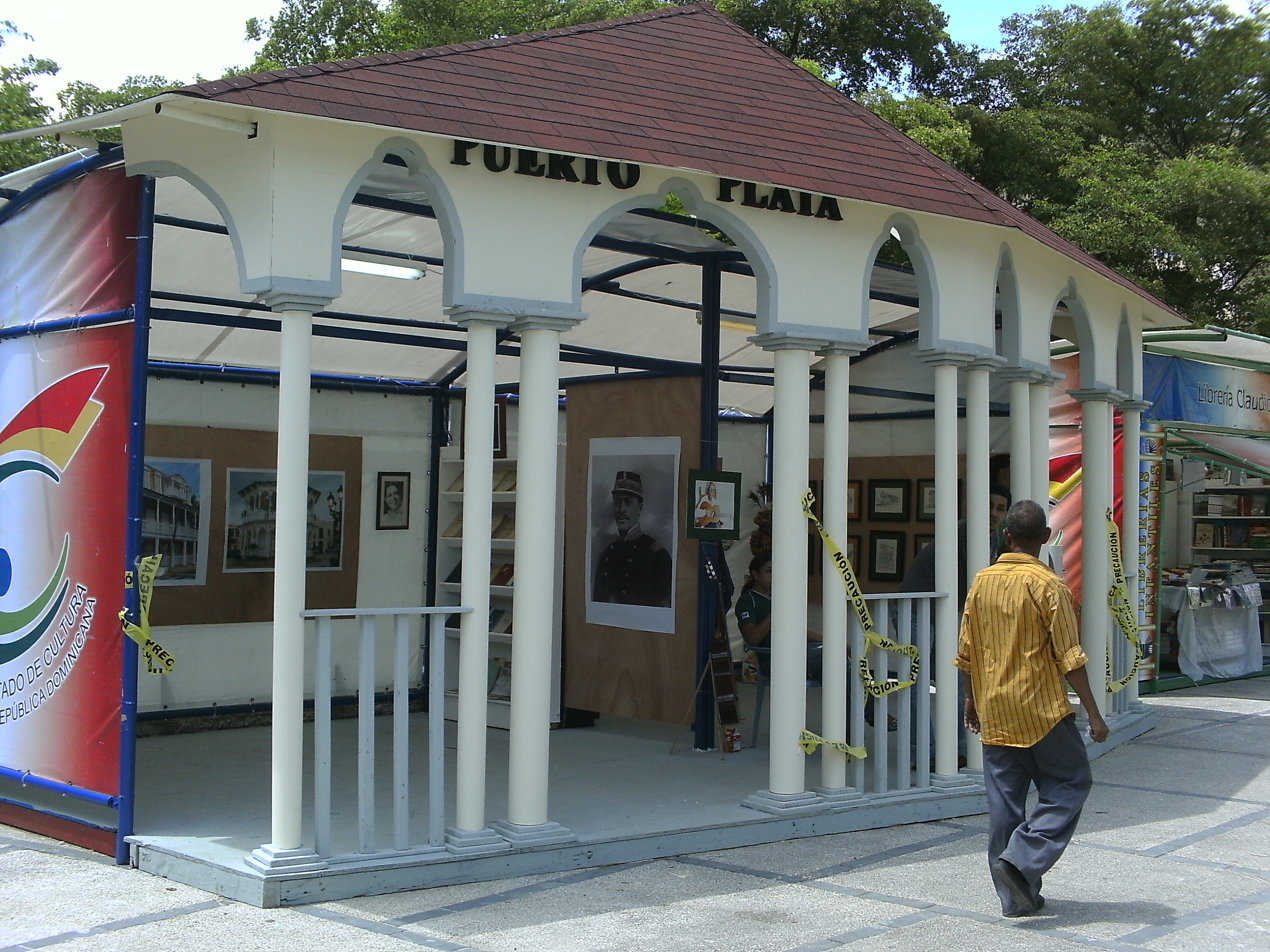
Puerto Plata section

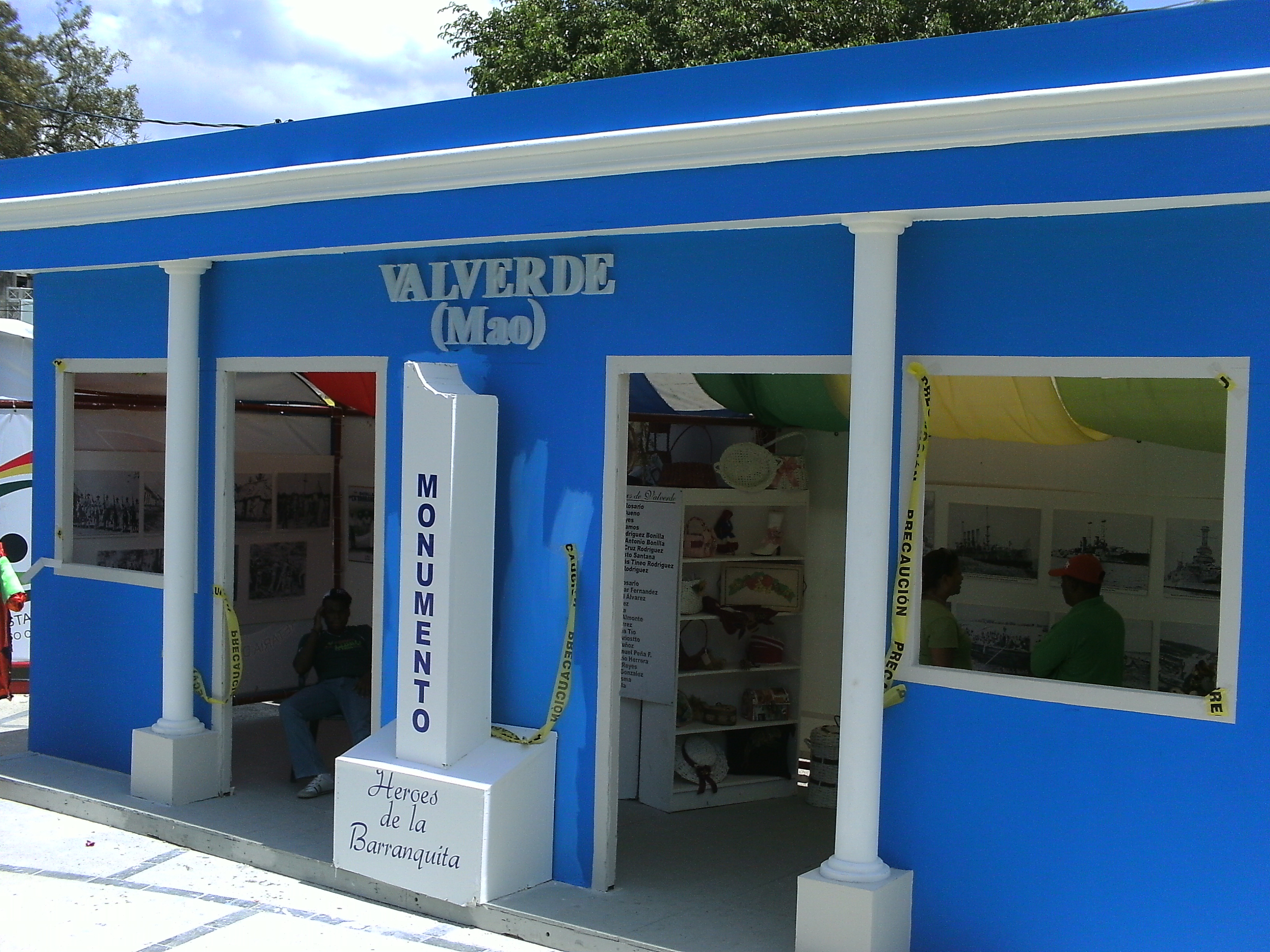
Mao section

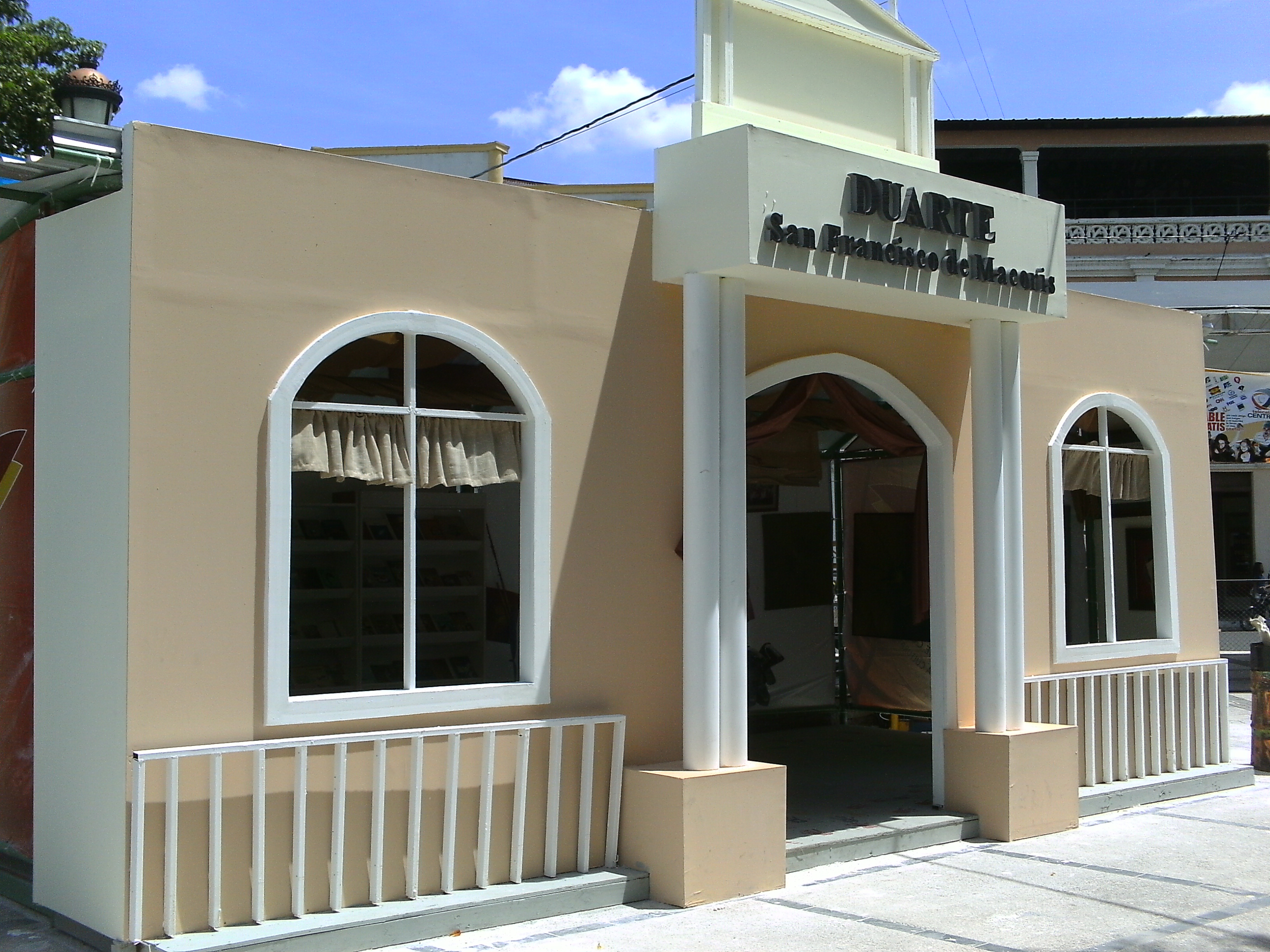
San Francisco de Macorís section

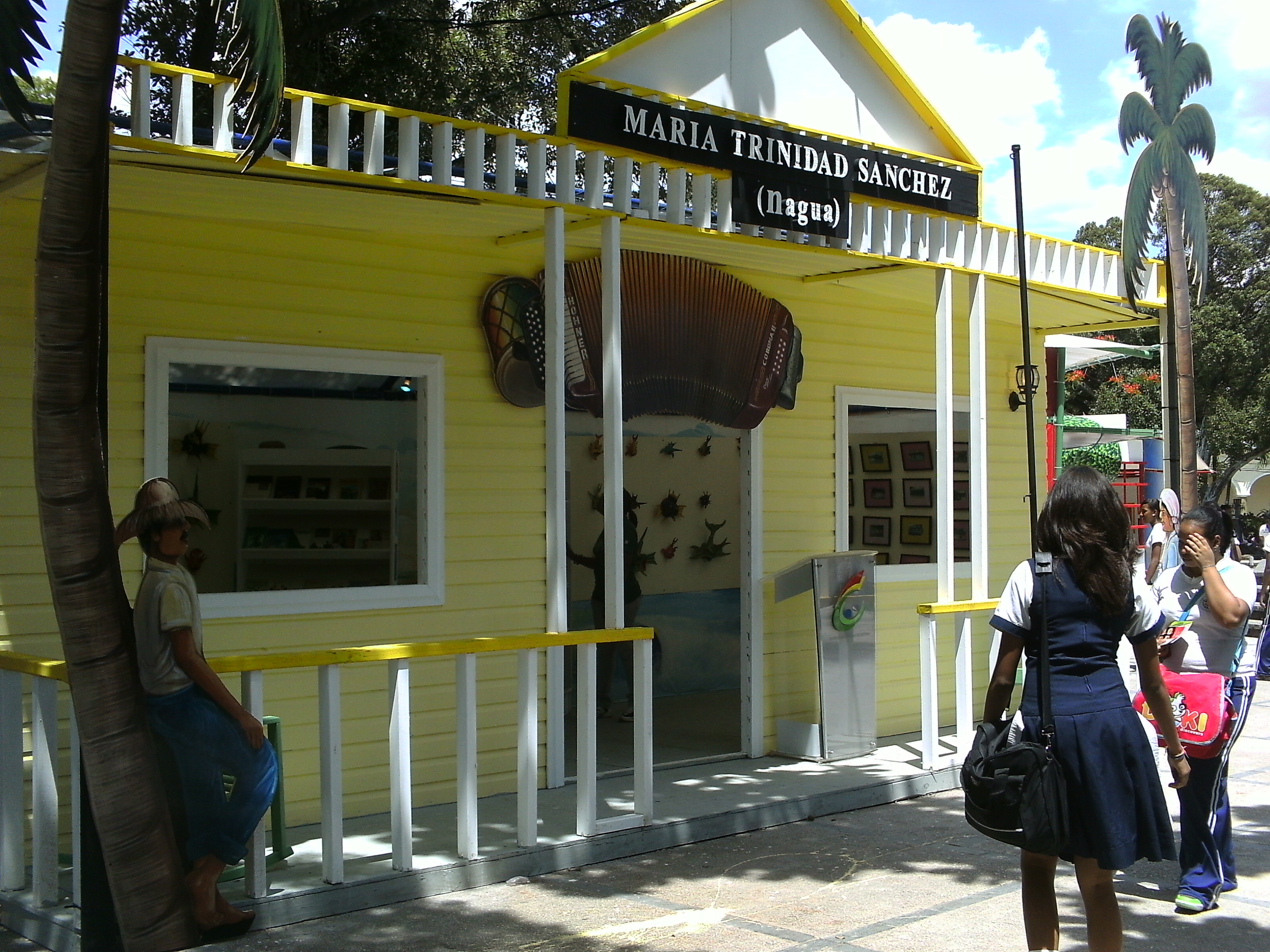
Nagua section

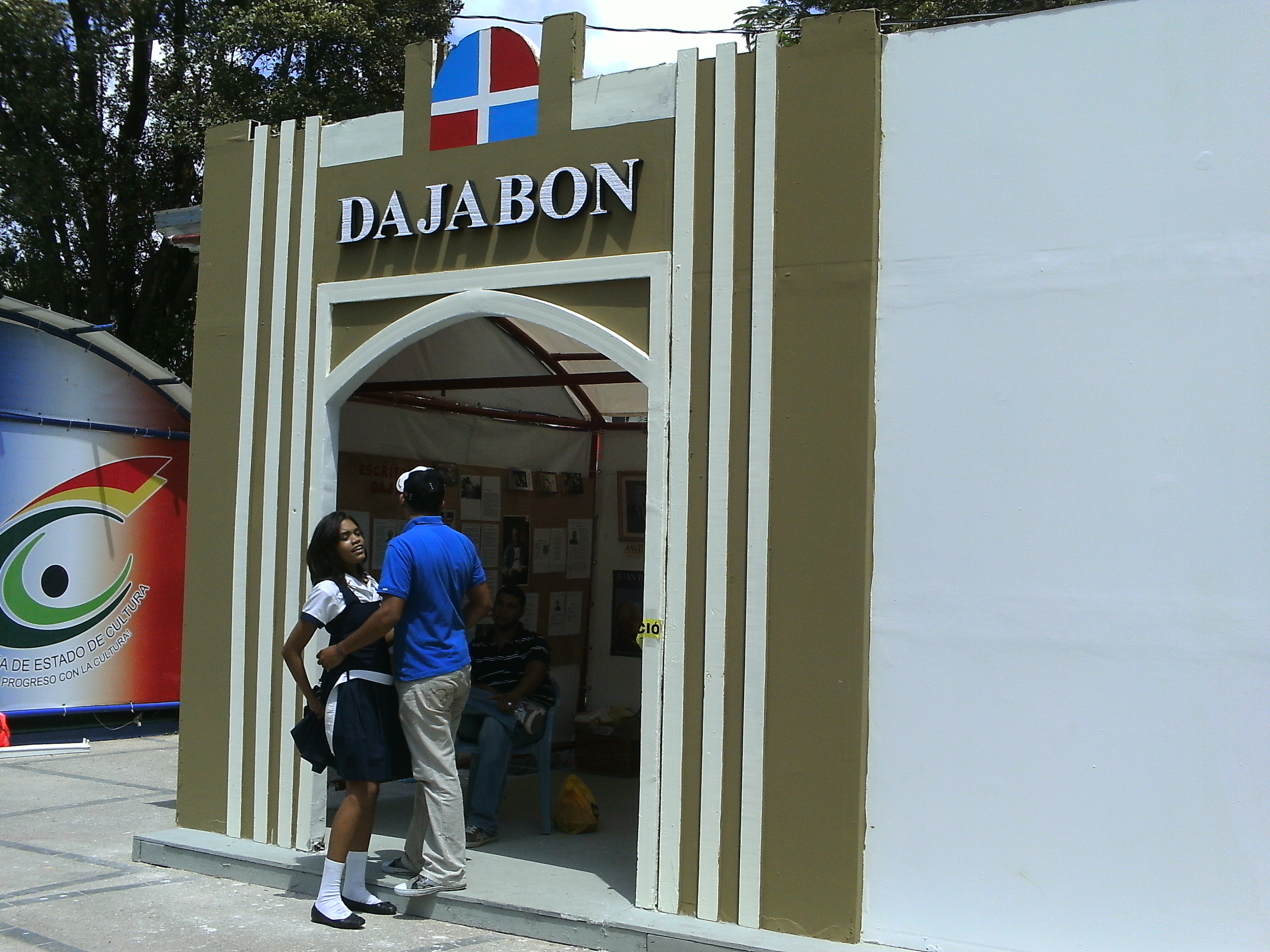
Dajabón section

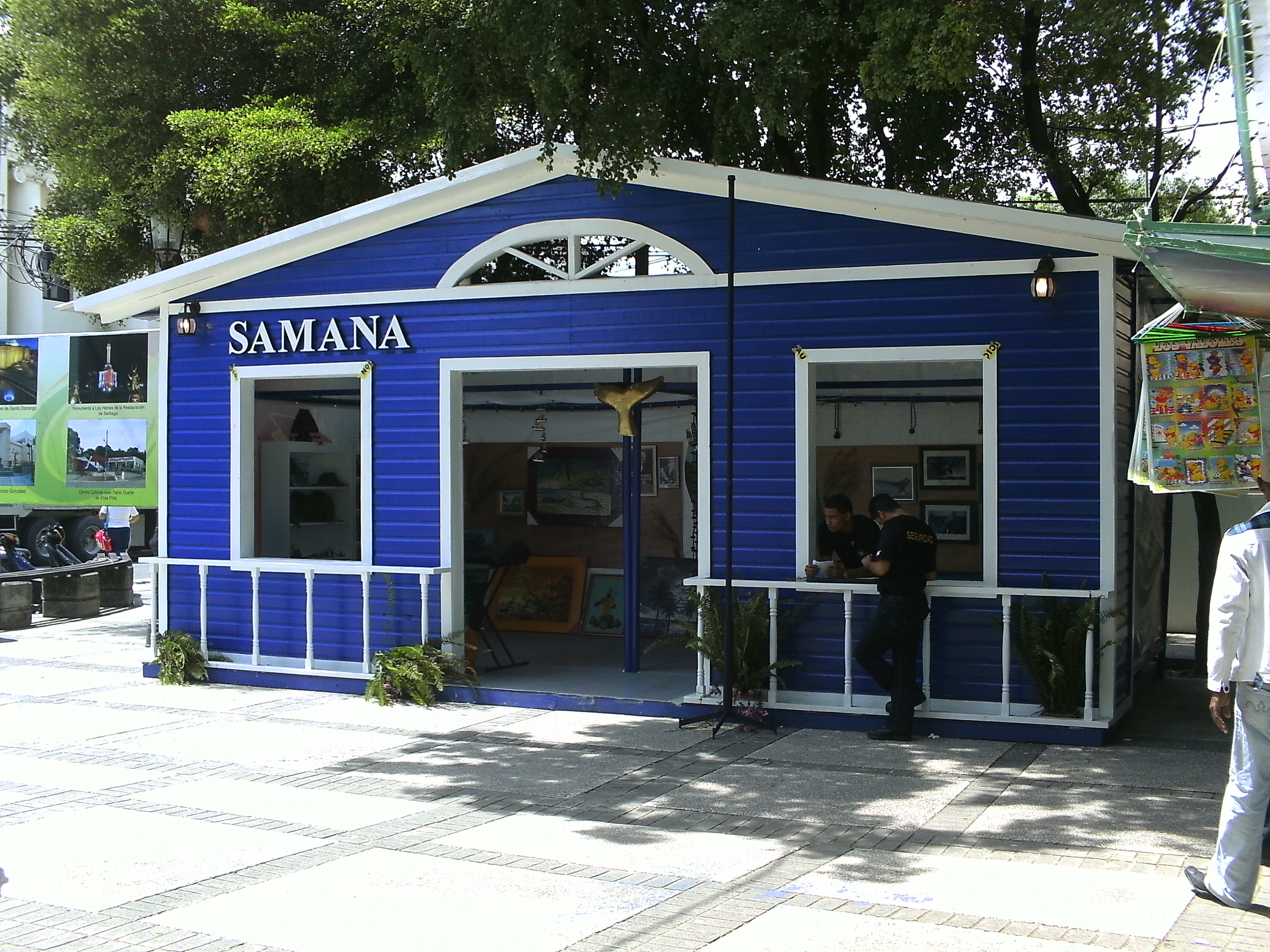
Samaná section

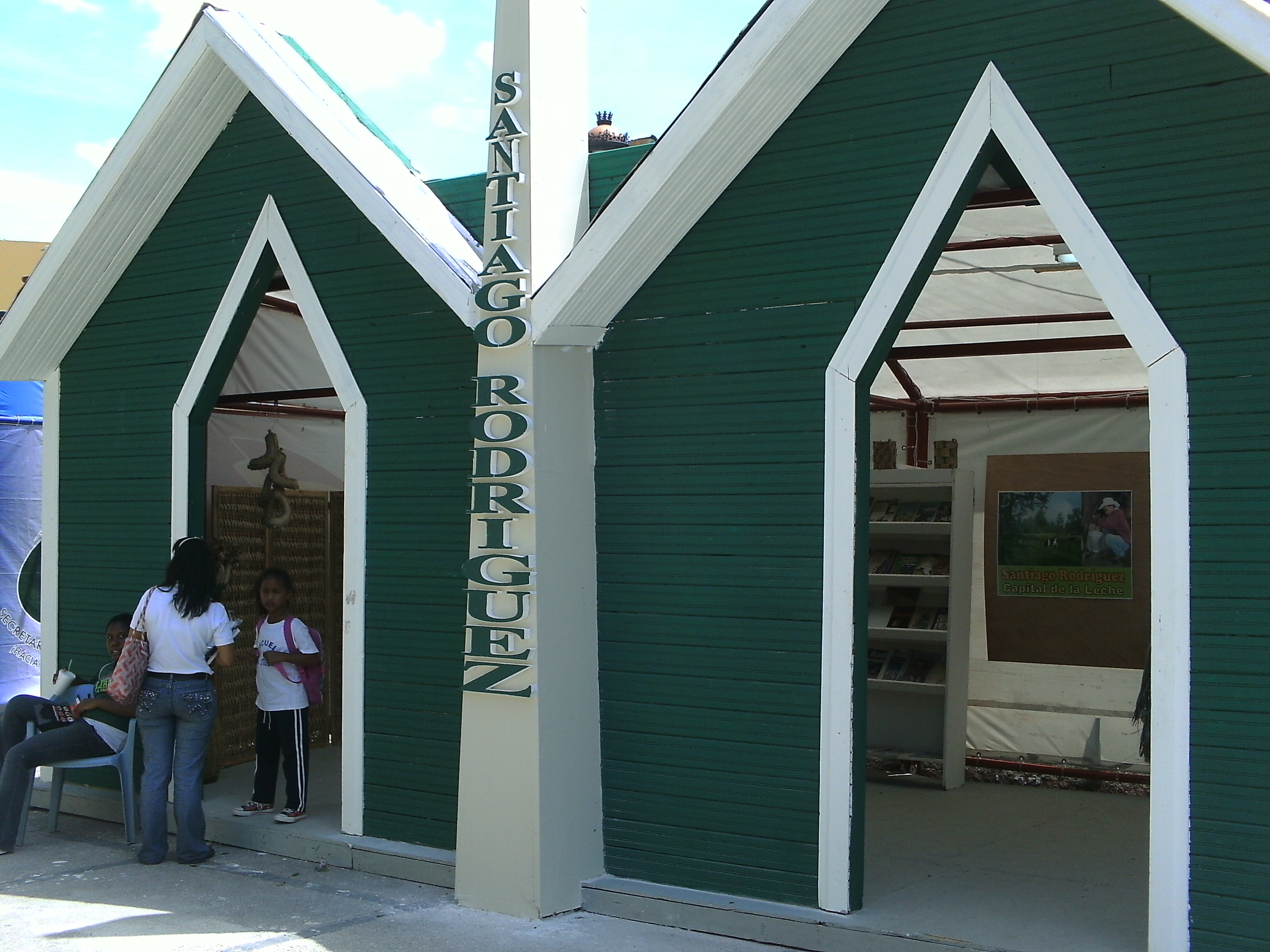
Santiago Rodriguez section

== Transportation ==
There are many bus companies which travel between La Vega other cities like: Santo Domingo, Santiago, Samana, Puerto Plata, and others. There is also El Ponton Field, which serves domestics flights.

== Sports ==
Each year between the months of October and December a basketball tournament is held in this city, it is called in Spanish Torneo Superior de Baloncesto de La Vega in English Superior Basketball Tournament of La Vega, This tournament started in October 1994 (after a time of political and cultural crisis between the years 1978 and October 1994). One team is still active, the other ("El Country Team") disappearing.

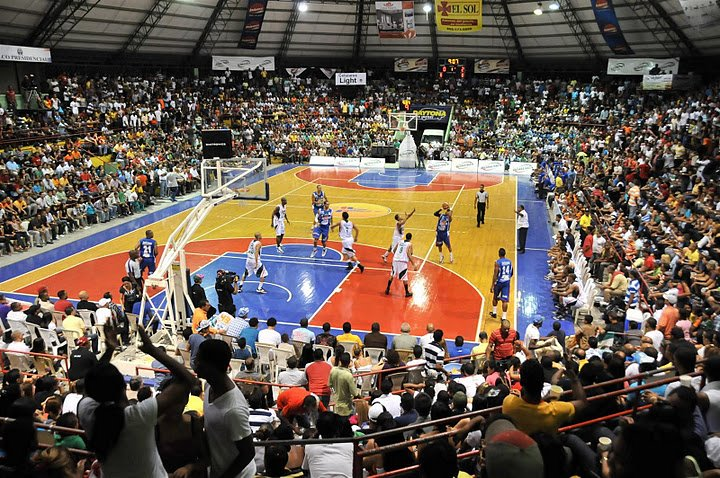
a match being held between La Matica and Enrriquillo

1994–2002	Club DOSA	Club Enriquillo	Club La Matica	Club Parque Hostos	Club Villa
1994	did not compete	disqualified	Champion	disqualified	runner up
1995	did not compete	disqualified	disqualified	Champion	runner up
1996	did not compete	canceled	canceled	disqualified	disqualified
1997	did not compete	disqualified	disqualified	runner up	Champion
1998	Champion	disqualified	runner up	disqualified	disqualified
1999	disqualified	disqualified	Champion	disqualified	Runner up
2000	disqualified	disqualified	Champion	disqualified	Runner up
2001	Runner up	disqualified	disqualified	Champion	disqualified
2002	disqualified	disqualified	Runner up	Champion	disqualified
2003–2012	Angelitos del DOSA	Guerreros del Enriquillo	Potros de La Matica	Tigres del Parque Hostos	Villanos de La Villa
2003	disqualified	Champion	disqualified	Runner up	disqualified
2004	disqualified	disqualified	Runner up	Champion	disqualified
2005	disqualified	disqualified	Runner up	Champion	disqualified
2006	disqualified	disqualified	Runner up	Champion	disqualified
2007	disqualified	disqualified	Runner up	Champion	disqualified
2008	Champion	disqualified	disqualified	Runner up	disqualified
2009	Runner up	disqualified	disqualified	Champion	disqualified
2010	Runner up	disqualified	Champion	disqualified	disqualified
2011	disqualified	disqualified	Champion	disqualified	Runner up
2012	Champion	Runner up	disqualified	disqualified	disqualified
2013–2014	Angelitos del DOSA	Rebeldes del Enriquillo	Potros de La Matica	Tigres del Parque Hostos	Villanos de La Villa
2013	Runner up	disqualified	disqualified	Champion	disqualified
2014	Champion	disqualified	disqualified	Runner up	disqualified
2015–present	Angelitos del DOSA	Rebeldes del Enriquillo	Potros de La Matica	Tigres del Parque Hostos	Fieras de La Villa
2015	disqualified	disqualified	disqualified	Runner up	Champion
2016	disqualified	Champion	disqualified	disqualified	Runner up
2017	Champion	Runner up	disqualified	disqualified	disqualified
2018	disqualified	disqualified	disqualified	Champion	Runner up
2019	Runner up	Champion	disqualified	disqualified	disqualified
2020	Due to the impact of COVID-19 pandemic, no competition was held in 2020				
2021	disqualified	disqualified	Champion	Runner up	disqualified
2022	disqualified	Runner up	disqualified	Champion	disqualified
2023	Runner up	disqualified	Champion	disqualified	disqualified

- El Parque Hostos is the most winning team with ten crowns (1995, 2001, 2002, 2004, 2005, 2006, 2007, 2009, 2013, 2018) and six times as runner up (1997, 2003, 2008, 2014, 2015, 2021).
- La Matica is the second most winning team with six crowns (1994, 1999, 2000, 2010, 2011, 2021), six times as first runner-up (1998, 2002, 2004, 2005, 2006, 2007) and qualified to the finals in 1996 but that year's finale was eventually canceled.
- DOSA is the third most winning team with five crowns (1998, 2008, 2012, 2014, 2017) and five times as first runner-up (2001, 2009, 2010, 2013, 2019).
- Enriquillo is the fourth most winning team with three crowns (2003, 2016, 2019), and two-time as first runner-up (2012, 2017) and qualified to the finals in 1996 but that year's finale was eventually canceled.
- La Villa is the fifth most winning team with two crowns (1997, 2015) and five times as runner up (1994, 1999, 2000, 2011, 2016, 2018).
- In the tournament number 19 (2012) was the first time in the history of this tournament that none of the most winning teams Club La Matica & Club Parque Hostos advanced to the final.

== Notable people ==
- Juan Bosch: famous writer, former president of the Dominican Republic, from February 27, 1963, to September 24, 1963, and for decades a top, national political leader
- Rhina Espaillat: bilingual Dominican-American poet
- Zoilo H. Garcia: aviator
- Luis Alberti: musician
- Juan Carlos Payano: boxer
- Victoriano Sosa: boxer
- Antonio Guzmán Fernández: former president of the Dominican Republic, 1978–1982
- Larimar Fiallo: Miss Dominican Republic 2004
- Cirilo J Guzmán: Lawyer
- Francisco Moncion: ballet dancer, charter member of the New York City Ballet and choreographer
- Carlos de la Mota: Televisa actor
- Vielka Valenzuela: Miss Dominican Republic 1994
- Carola Durán: Miss Dominican Republic 2012
- Ana Julia Quezada: murderer
- Jonathan Villar: professional baseball player for the New York Mets of Major League Baseball.

== Photo gallery ==
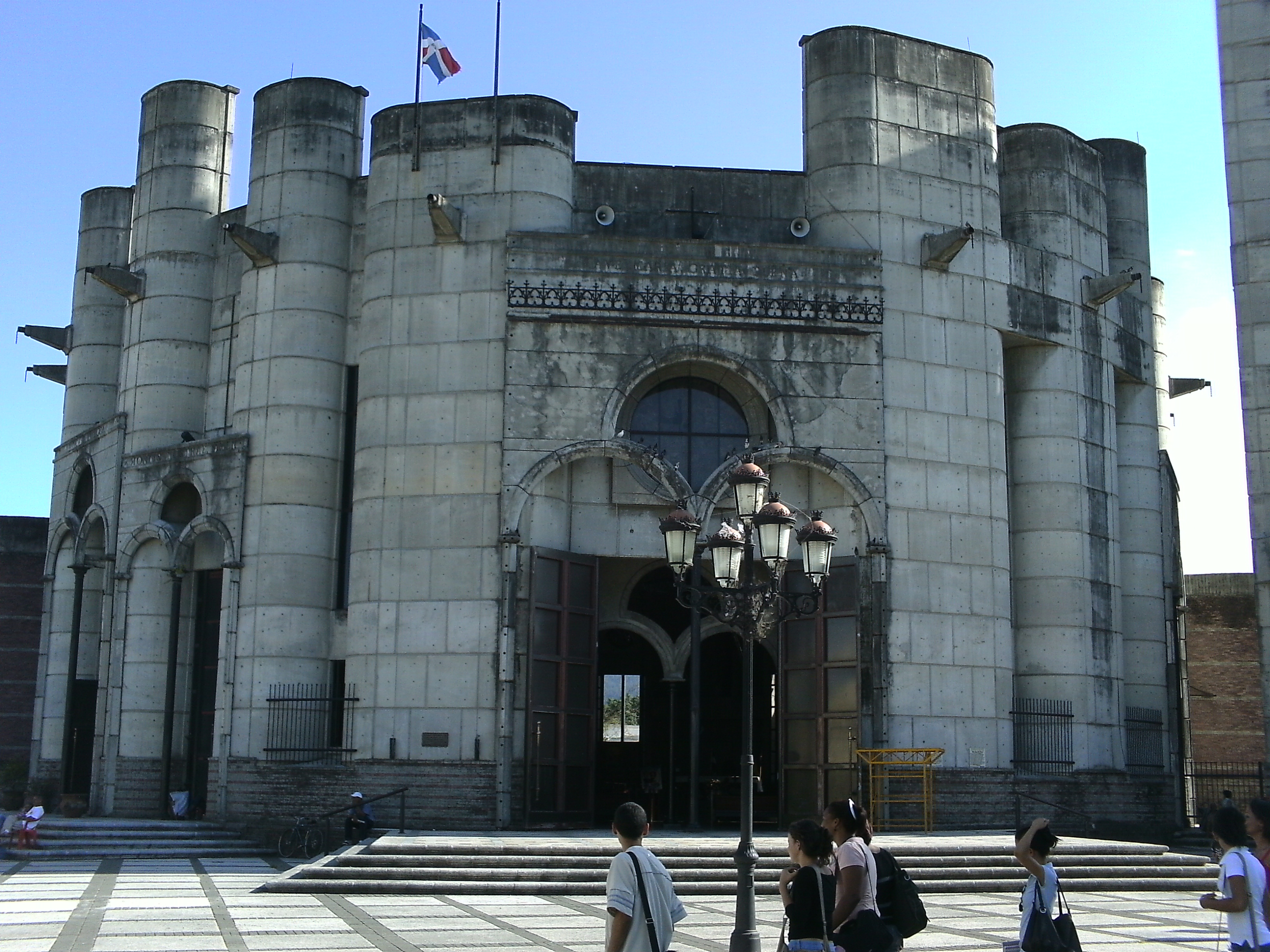
The Catedral of La Vega

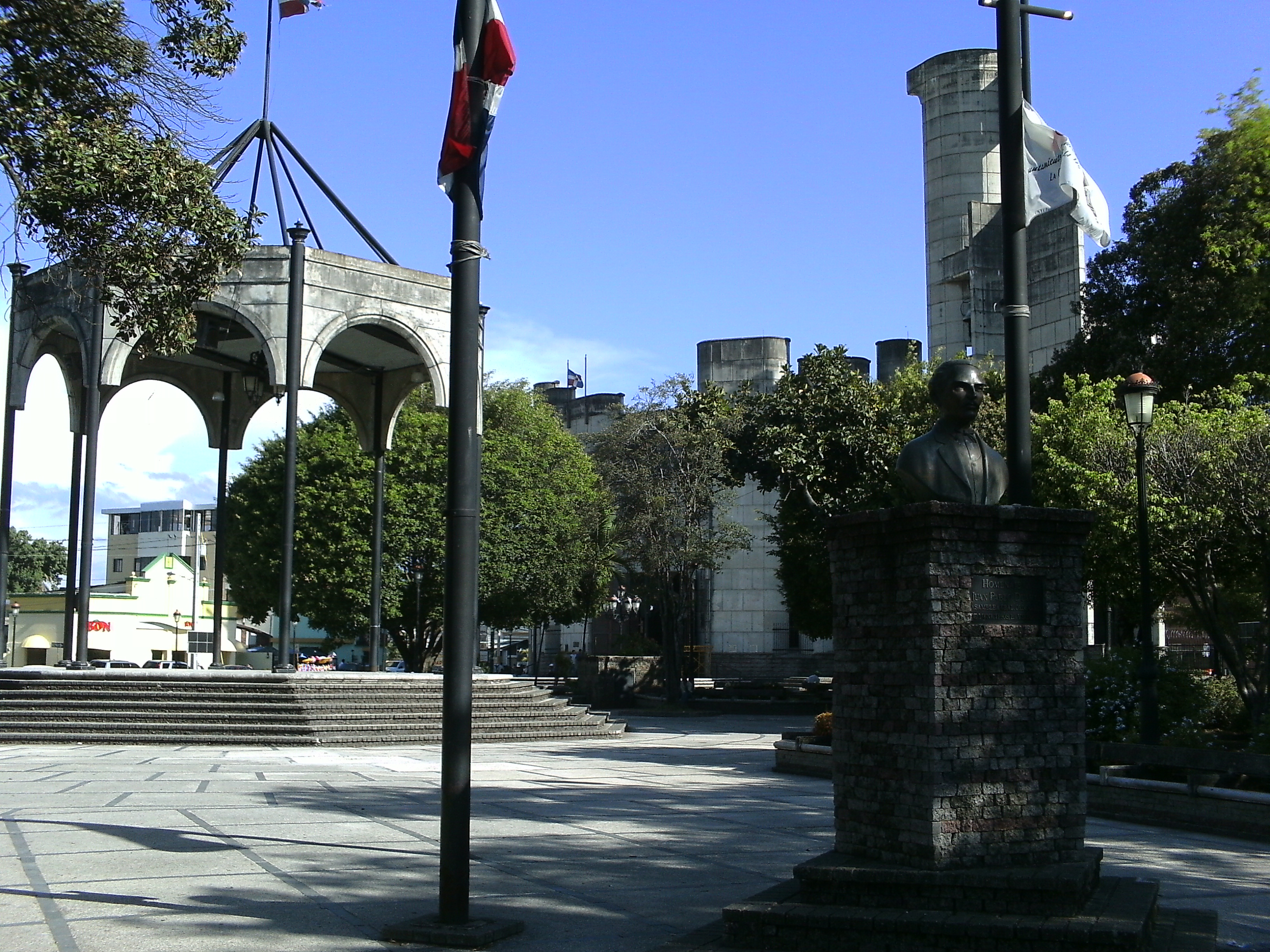
Plaza Duarte

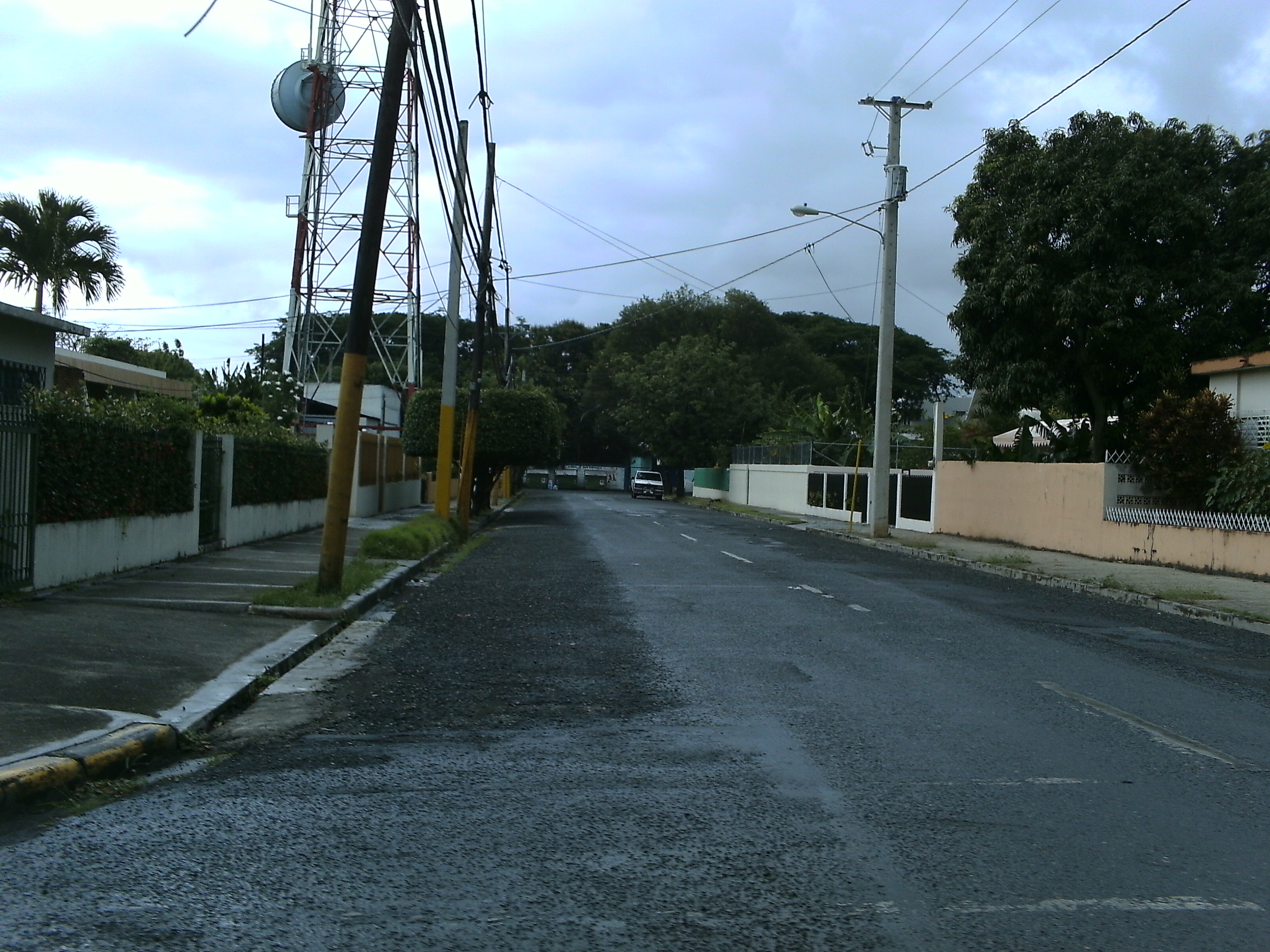
A typical neighborhood

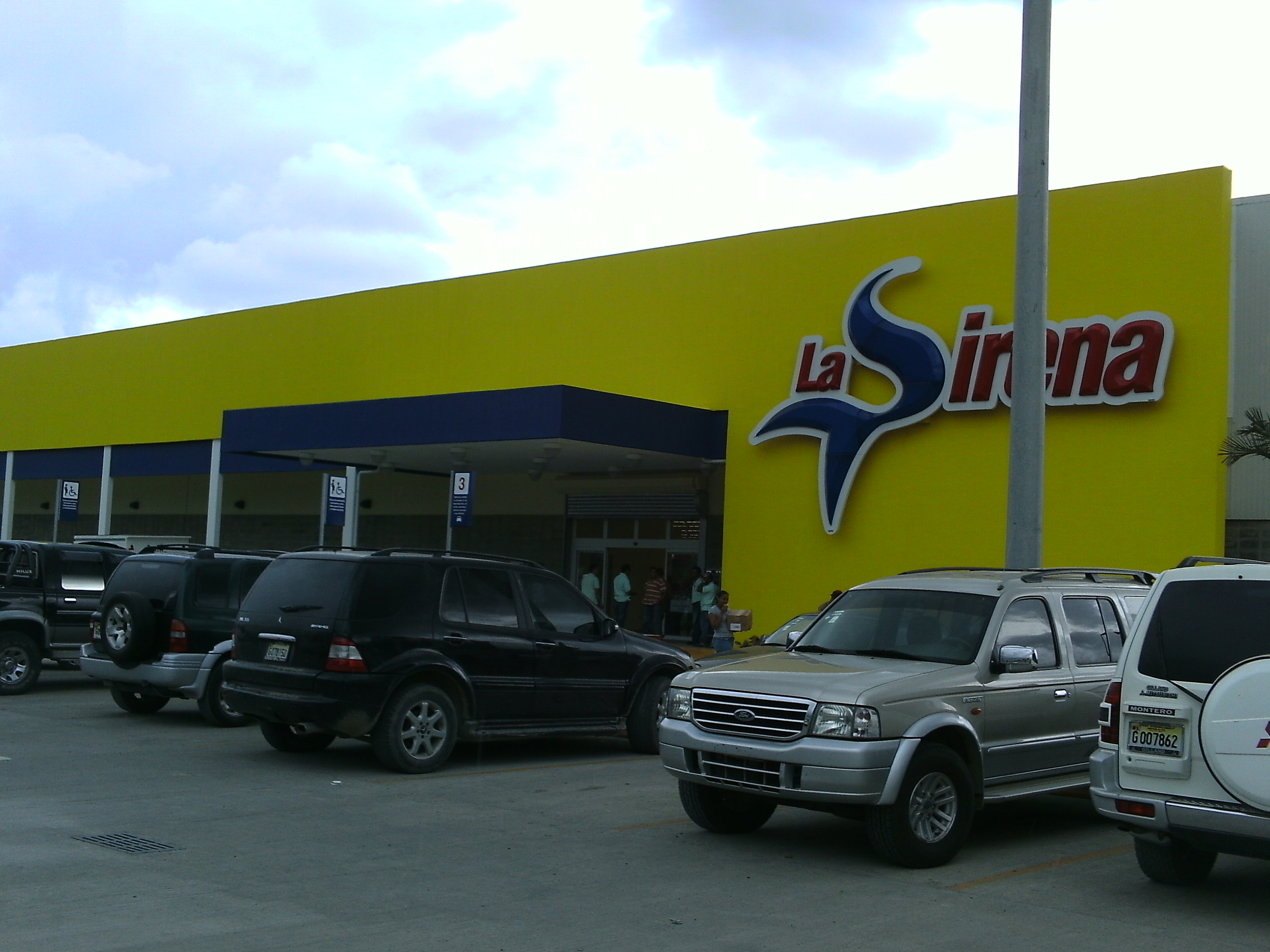
Commercial center in La Vega

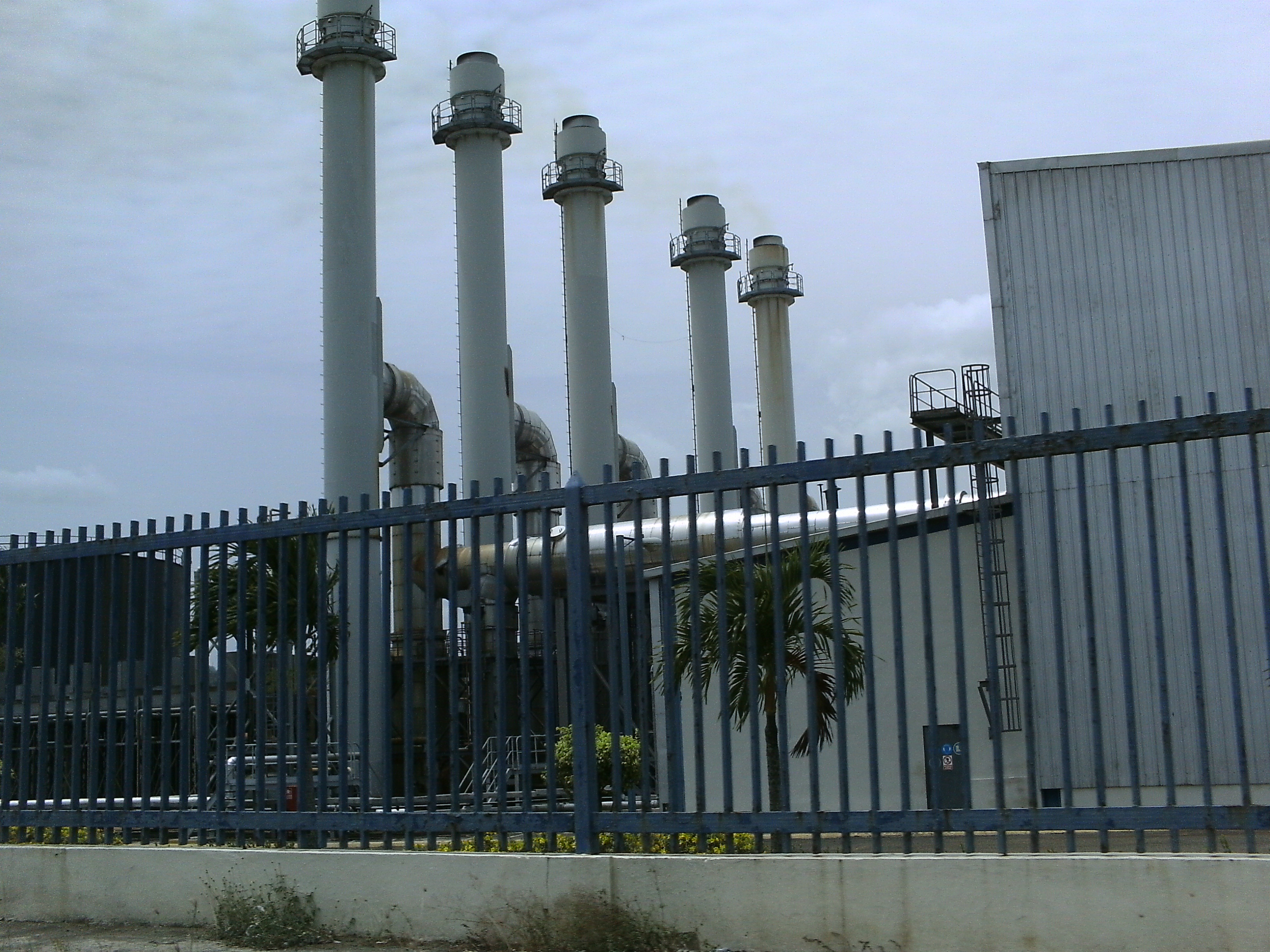
Electrical center in La Vega
