= Zoilo H. Garcia =

Dominican civil engineer (1881–1916)

Zoilo Hermogenes García Peña
- Born: Zoilo Hermogenes García Peña; December 21, 1881; La Vega, Dominican Republic
- Died: December 11, 1916 (aged 34); La Vega, Dominican Republic
- Occupation: Civil Engineer
- Spouse: Luisa Teresa Fernandez Perez
- Children: Zoilo Hermogenes Hena de la Concepción; Triana Mercedes García Tirso de Jesus García Fernandez
- Relatives: Don Zoilo García (father); Maria Dolores Peña (mother)

Zoilo Hermogenes García Peña (December 21, 1881 - December 11, 1916) was a civil engineer and aviator from the Dominican Republic. Besides being a prolific engineer credited with building, among other things, the first theater of La Vega, he is best remembered for designing and flying the first Dominican heavier-than-air aircraft in 1911–1912.

== Early life ==
Zoilo Hermogenes García Peña was born in La Vega to Maria Dolores Peña and Don Zoilo Garcia, a businessman, general in the Dominican forces and for a time governor of La Vega. Besides being a successful entrepreneur and exporter of cocoa and tobacco, his father is remembered for attempting to save the life of Dominican Presidente General Ulises Heureaux.

Garcia traveled to France to study civil engineering at Institut Industriel du Nord (today École Centrale de Lille), graduating in 1902 as the first Dominican to do so. He returned to La Vega and in 1908 married Luisa Teresa Fernandez Perez. He built several buildings, among them the first theater of La Vega.

== Polyplane ==
Between 1906 and 1911 Garcia created the design for his own airplane, taking inspirations from the original Wright Flyer to Alberto Santos Dumont’s 14bis and the Voisin and Bleriot biplanes. He called his design the ‘Poliplano’, or ‘Polyplane’ in English, meaning multi-wings due to its three wings.

Garcia attempted to create interest in his design and its potentials with the Dominican government, convincing them to back his project and clearing a landing strip in the Sabana de Ponton area of La Vega on 17 January 1911.

He acquired partial funding and traveled to Long Island, placing an order for the construction of the Poliplano according to his specifications with the American Aeroplane Supply House, a Long Island airplane manufacturer specializing in Bleriot monoplanes. Construction began on 4 February 1911 using equipment and parts used for the Bleriot planes.

In July of the same year he began taking flying lessons with the instructor James Lester Weeks and also engaged Weeks as the aviation instructor for the Dominican army. Attempts were made to persuade Garcia to remove the ‘poly’ part of the plane and recognize it as a monoplane. He seemed to have rejected the name change as it is continually referred to as a 'Poliplano'.

By August 1911 the manufacturers ran into trouble with Garcia's design, possibly due to a miscalculation in the weight of the Roberts engine. Construction was put on hold and Garcia returned to Santo Domingo.

Back in La Vega Garcia helped organize the La Vega Center of Aviation with the purpose of opening a flight school once the Polyplane arrived on the island and so kick start the Dominican flight industry.

Garcia returned to Long Island in January 1912. Construction had continued and the plane was completed on February 20, 1912. Its specifications are registered as the Garcia Polyplane, 6-cylinder, 75-horsepower Roberts motor with a Gibson propeller. The first flight attempts on the Nassau Boulevard Aerodrome seem to have been a failure. The pilot and flight engineer Fred Schneider who had worked with the Wright and Curtis planes, was quoted as saying that the design was to blame.

Disappointed, Garcia ordered the plane dismantled and shipped by boat to the Dominican Republic. Some Dominican news outlets falsely reported that the plane was destroyed in a fire, but this may be a misunderstanding stemming from a storm that ravaged the Nassau Boulevard Aerodrome on 24 February 1912, damaging a few planes and hangars.

== La Vega flight attempts ==
Back on the airstrip in Sabana del Ponton in La Vega, Garcia reassembled the plane himself. The reassembly was often falsely reported as the actual construction.

Using the knowledge he had acquired as a pilot, he attempted to correct the design errors, taking the plane on various test flights along the Ponton air strip.

In the Santiago newspaper El Progreso appeared an article by Rafael Sanchez Gil describing a test flight as:

[...]I myself have touched and have seen the device rising to a very high altitude... The most perfect balance I have seen him keep the device in the air was at the moments when Mr. García let it fall abandoned to its weight to show the slowness with which, in a given case and without the slightest bit of danger, a descent could be made, when for some reason the engine or any other part of the apparatus would deprive it of its initial impulse[...]

The same article shows that Garcia later approached the directors of the Aviation Center to recommend the dissolution of said organization. He wrote off the Polyplane as a financial loss. The plane is reported to have remained at the Sabana de Ponton landing strip where it rotted away.

== Death ==
Garcia died in 1916 after battling a high fever. He was 34 years of age, 10 days shy of his 35th birthday.

== Gyrocopter ==
In 1983 the son of Garcia, Tirso de Jesus García Fernandez, built and flew a gyrocopter called the Cabra Loca, the Mad Goat, from Puerto Rico to the Dominican Republic.
