= Dulcita Lieggi =

Dominican actress and model (born 1989)

- Born: Dulcita Lynn Lieggi Francisco; 19 May 1989 (age 37); Santo Domingo, Dominican Republic
- Occupations: Professional model and actress
- Height: 1.75 m (5 ft 9 in)
- Beauty pageant titleholder
- Title: Miss Dominican Republic 2012
- Hair color: Brown
- Eye color: Green
- Major competitions: Miss Italia nel Mondo 2009; Miss Universe 2012 (Unplaced)

Dulcita Lynn Lieggi Francisco (born 19 May 1989, in Santo Domingo) is a Dominican actress, model and beauty pageant title-holder. Ms. Lieggi was originally placed first runner-up to Carola Durán at Miss Dominican Republic 2012, but later Durán was dethroned and the title was given to Lieggi. Lieggi then represented the Dominican Republic at Miss Universe 2012.

== Early life ==
Lieggi was born in Santo Domingo to father native of Mola di Bari (Apulia, Southern Italy) and a mother from Puerto Plata, Northern Dominican Republic.

== Miss Dominican Republic and Miss Universe 2012 ==
Lieggi competed as a representative of the province of Distrito Nacional, being one of 37 candidates in the country of Dominican Republic in the national beauty contest, Miss Dominican Republic 2012, broadcast live from Santo Domingo on 17 April 2012, where she became the first runner up for the title, winning the right to represent the Dominican Republic in Miss Continente Americano 2012. The second runner up, Carolyn Hawa, from Santiago, will represent the Dominican Republic in the Reina Hispanoamericana 2012 in Bolivia. The third runner up was Alondra Peña of Peravia, and the fourth runner up was Luz Quezada of San José de Ocoa. On 24 April 2012, exactly one week after winning the crown, Durán was dethroned for having once been married.

Lieggi got the title of Miss Dominican Republic 2012 representing the province of the capital, Distrito Nacional. She went on to compete in the Miss Universe 2012 pageant held in Las Vegas, USA. Lieggi did not make it to the top 16.

== Filmography ==
Year	Title	Character	Director	Country
2010	Lily	Lily	Shahzad Yunas	(Dominican Republic)
2011	El dinero	hooker	Alberto Matos Soto	(Dominican Republic)
2014	Locas y Atrapadas	Amanda	Alfonso Rodríguez	(Dominican Republic)
2014	Al Sur de la Inocencia	Laura	Héctor Valdez	(Dominican Republic)

== Notes ==
^{note 1} Lieggi was originally first Runner-up, but became Miss Dominican Republic 2012 after the original titleholder, Carola Durán, was dethroned

Awards and achievements
Preceded by Dalia Fernández (2011); Carola Durán (2012; Dethroned)	Miss Dominican Republic; 2012 (Successor)	Succeeded by Yaritza Reyes
