= Reina Mundial del Banano =

International beauty pageant based in Ecuador

Reina Mundial del Banano (World Queen of Bananas) is a beauty pageant held in Machala, Ecuador since 1985, and is restricted to banana producing countries. The pageant is broadcast in Ecuador by Canal Uno.

== Titleholders ==
Year	Reina Mundial Del Banano	1sr Place	2nd Place	3rd Place	4th Place	5th Place
1985	Rosibel Chacón Pereira; Costa Rica	Cristiane Lasita Passos; Brazil	Mónica Espinoza; Ecuador	Joanne Goiri González; Venezuela	Yanina Maricel Castaño; Argentina	Not awarded
1986	Betzabeth Emilia Coelles Araújo; Venezuela	María Eugenia Benjamín; Panama	Claudia Patricia Ruiz; Colombia	Yamila Salaya; Argentina	Anamaria Marques Stark; Brazil	Not awarded
1987	Carla Irene Trombotti Moreno; Uruguay	Doris Mora Bejarano; Ecuador	Not awarded	Not awarded	Not awarded	Not awarded
1988	Ximena Paullette Correa Jarre; Ecuador	Rita Rosina Verreos; Venezuela	Emma Betancourt Suárez; Colombia	Not awarded	Not awarded	Not awarded
1989	Cristiane Corrales Ferreira; Brazil	Vivian Sanabria; Costa Rica	Not awarded	Not awarded	Not awarded	Not awarded
1990	Luz Angélica Ruiz Velasco; Mexico	Daniela Lores Quintero; Venezuela	Virna Passelly Machuca; El Salvador	Not awarded	Not awarded	Not awarded
1991	Mónica Rodríguez Cháves; Colombia	María Fernanda Corral Dazza; Ecuador	Not awarded	Not awarded	Not awarded	Not awarded
1992	Gisselle Amelia González Aranda; Panama	Idis Mabel Vélez Romero; Puerto Rico	Iglaê Gunther; Brazil	Claudia Bastón Monquera; Argentina	Mónica Aída González Mejía; Mexico	Not awarded
1993	Yadira Yesenia Ríos García; Mexico	Phyllis Motta Ruiz De Somucursio; Panama	Nashali Enchautegui Ramírez; Puerto Rico	Farley Derly Ferreira da Silva; Brazil	Maria Angélica González Luque; Colombia	Not awarded
1994	Liliana Noemi González Mena; Paraguay	Ana Lucía Granda Aguilar; Ecuador	Lucy Vásquez Almonte; Dominican Republic	Maria Fernanda Navarro Guigou; Uruguay	Solange Guadalupe Magnano Silvestro; Argentina	Not awarded
1995	Gabriela Aguilar Chavarría; Costa Rica	Fabiana Fontanella; Brazil	Rocío del Pilar Abed Chafloque; Peru	Patricia Serafini Geoghegan; Paraguay	Roxana Maria Pérez del Castillo; Bolivia	Not awarded
1996	Paula Denisse Simom; Brazil	Marisela Moreno Montero; Panama	Claudia Romina Pinargote Delgado; Ecuador	Not awarded	Not awarded	Not awarded
1997	Adriana de Jesús Zúñiga Sáenz; Costa Rica	Karla Hannelore Beteta Forkel; Guatemala	Karla Cedena Vélez; Ecuador	Jackeline Negrón Divieri; Puerto Rico	Lisette Morán; Dominican Republic	Not awarded
1998	Jessica Lynn Bryan Gándara; Guatemala	Noelia Ortiz Melo; Italy	Mónica Patricia Sáenz Grimm; Peru	María Elisa Jara; Ecuador	Verónica Antelo; Bolivia	Not awarded
1999	Amaloha Elisa Méndez Silverio; Venezuela	Viviana Brener Campo; Costa Rica	Georgette Giovanna Medina Pinzón; Colombia	Kristy Bitting; Puerto Rico	Lucía de Oslazábal; Peru	Not awarded
2000	Melania Canino Santos; Puerto Rico	Alejandra Vélez Londoño; Colombia	Katia Peterli Camargos; Brazil	Lourdes Quirola; Ecuador	Ana Valentina Montero Lugano; Venezuela	Not awarded
2001	Claudia Alejandra Palacios López; Colombia	Shadelyn López; Puerto Rico	Ana Lucia de Bastos Herrera; Venezuela	Jessica Alaña; Ecuador	Mireya Castedo Soliz; Bolivia	Not awarded
2002	Isabel Cristina Estrada Cano; Colombia	Susanne Tocker; Germany	Laura Carolina Molina Navarro; Venezuela	Maria Gabriela Riquelme; Paraguay	Priscila Verónica Del Salto Astudillo; Ecuador	Not awarded
2003	Liliana Judith De Cambil Ávila; Colombia	Amanda Cothran; United States	Claudia Kindscherousky; Germany	Nelda Esther Sánchez Cantoral; Panama	Alanna Valquiria Arruda Silva; Brazil	Leslie Lizeth Caballero; Honduras
2004	Anna María Ezechiels; Canada	María Gabriela Granda Román; Ecuador	Leanna Pareja; United States	Farrah Edwards Moncriffe; Costa Rica	Gabriela Zavala Irias; Honduras	Not awarded
2005	Tatiana María Bastidas Castañeda; Colombia	Jessica Torejani; Brazil	Gretal Montgomery; Panama	Estefany Carolina Salgado Tomaselly; Ecuador	Josmila Fajardo; Venezuela	Not awarded
2006	Verónica María González Quesada; Costa Rica	Rosibel María Eugenia Macías Álava; Ecuador	María Jesús Salas Calvo; Peru	Joanna Giselle Gallo Hosein; Venezuela	Ana María Castañeda Gómez; Colombia	Not awarded
2007	Jennifer Johanna Schell Dorantes; Venezuela	Izaskun Arana Cándela; Ecuador	Jennifer Schott; Canada	Laura Montoya Escobar; Colombia	Stephanie Joan Araúz Shaw; Panama	Not awarded
2008	Amanda Renee Delgado; United States	Nailette Cristina Romero Gazaui; Venezuela	Gloria Patricia Pérez Peñuela; Colombia	María Silvana Belli Vega; Argentina	Paola Casilla Agnes; Dominican Republic	Not awarded
2009	Josephine Karam León; Venezuela	Dalia Cristina Fernández Sánchez; Dominican Republic	Livia Brito Pestaña; Mexico	Viviana Cortez Zúñiga; Ecuador	Dayana Luara Incandela; Argentina	Not awarded
2010	Hilda Alessa Gamez Phillips; Honduras	Laura Vivian Spoya Solano; Peru	Ava Ferdowsmakan; Canada	Saira Yael Hernández Duval; Mexico	Esmeralda Alejandrina Yaniche Vásquez; Venezuela	Not awarded
2011	Lizeth Carolina González Romero; Colombia	Johanna Acs; Germany	Elishia Aman Sahota; Canada	Jessica María Schell Dorant; Venezuela	María Gracia Figueroa; Peru	Not awarded
2012	Jennifer Valle; Honduras	Nerys Margarita Díaz Ramírez; Venezuela	Ruth Estefanía Guevara Yánez; Ecuador	Karla Paulina Gutiérrez García; Mexico	Natalia Leyva Lezcano; Puerto Rico	Not awarded
2013	Manou Volkmer; Germany	Donají López; Mexico	Carolina Yanuzzi; Argentina	Kennya Araújo da Silva; Brazil	Natasha Muñoz; Puerto Rico	Not awarded
2014	Susan Romanishin; United States	Alessah Freitas; Brazil	Axel López; Venezuela	Jessica Lerma; Mexico	Nicole Velásquez; Ecuador	Not awarded
2015	Carolina Rodríguez; Costa Rica	Yuliska Guevara; Venezuela	Not awarded	Not awarded	Not awarded	Not awarded
2016	Ivana Yturbe Contreras; Peru	Rusbell Lòpez; Venezuela	Grettel Rodríguez; Costa Rica	Karem Varas; Ecuador	Suzana Sampeir; Haiti	Not awarded
2017	Yenny Carrillo; Colombia	Karen Robles; Costa Rica	Ivonne Hernández; Mexico	Sthefany Sánchez; Ecuador	Valeria Cardona; Honduras	Gabriela Decena; Venezuela
2018	Jhelenny Tello; Ecuador	María Alejandra Chacón; Colombia	Melody Calderón; Peru	Nataly Vargas; Mexico	Not awarded	Not awarded
2019	Ellen Pimienta Glen; Colombia	Celinee Santos; Dominican Republic	Allison Matamoros; Ecuador	Graziella Luca; Germany	María Alexandra Pinillos; Peru	Not awarded
2022	Gina Paola Vergara Farez; Ecuador	Taya Wolf; Germany	Geraldine Quiroz Bermudez; Colombia	Ana Grisell Romero Najera; Honduras	Maria Rita Dos Santos; Brazil	Not awarded
2025	Alba Saura Andres; Spain	Elena Collins; Canada	Maria Alejandra Ortega Zanbrano; Ecuador	Delia Mejia; Dominican Republic	Kathleen Arianis Perez Coffre; Panama	Liz Zamora Yanquen Florez; Colombia
2026	Vanessa Williams; Switzerland	Luisa Trujillo; Colombia	Leiya López; Peru	Bibeybi Baez; Dominican Republic	Alejandra Correa; Mexico	Karina Bonilla; Puerto Rico

== Titles By Countries ==
=== Reina Mundial Del Banano ===
Country/Territory	Títles	Year(s)
Colombia	8	1991, 2001, 2002, 2003, 2005, 2011, 2017, 2019
Costa Rica	5	1985, 1995, 1997, 2006, 2015
Venezuela	4	1986, 1999, 2007, 2009
Ecuador	3	1988, 2018, 2022
United States	2	2008, 2014
Honduras	2	2010, 2012
Brazil	2	1989, 1996
Mexico	2	1990, 1993
Switzerland	1	2026
Spain	1	2025
Peru	1	2016
Germany	1	2013
Canada	1	2004
Puerto Rico	1	2000
Guatemala	1	1998
Paraguay	1	1994
Panama	1	1992
Uruguay	1	1987

=== Virreina Mundial Del Banano ===
Country/Territory	Títles	Year(s)
Venezuela	6	1988, 1990, 2008, 2012, 2015, 2016
Ecuador	6	1987, 1991, 1994, 2004, 2006, 2007
Brazil	4	1985, 1995, 2005, 2014
Colombia	3	2000, 2018, 2026
Costa Rica	3	1989, 1999, 2017
Panama	3	1986, 1996, 1993
Dominican Republic	2	2009, 2019
Germany	2	2002, 2011
Puerto Rico	2	1992, 2001
Mexico	1	2013
Peru	1	2010
United States	1	2003
Italy	1	1998
Guatemala	1	1997

== See also ==
- List of beauty contests
