= Dalia Fernández =

Dominican beauty pageant titleholder

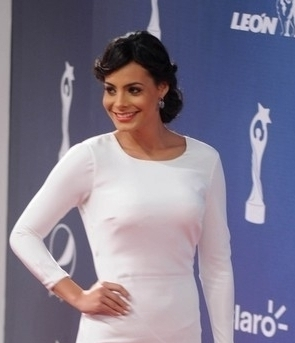
- Born: Dalia Cristina Fernández Sánchez; January 3, 1990 (age 36); Santiago de los Caballeros, Dominican Republic
- Beauty pageant titleholder
- Title: Virreina Mundial del Banano 2009; Miss Santiago 2011; Miss Dominican Republic 2011; Miss Continente Americano Dominican Republic 2011
- Hair color: Brown
- Eye color: Hazel
- Major competitions: Reina Mundial del Banano 2009 (Virreina Mundial del Banano); Miss Dominican Republic 2011 (Winner); Miss Universe 2011 (Unplaced); Miss Continente Americano 2011 (1st Runner-Up)

Dalia Cristina Fernández Sánchez (born January 3, 1990, in Santiago de los Caballeros) is a Dominican model and beauty pageant titleholder who was crowned Miss Dominican Republic 2011 and represented her country at the 2011 Miss Universe pageant.

In 2012, she was selected by Luz García's Noche de Luz programme as a "Summer's Hot Body".

== Early life ==
Prior to her participation in Miss Dominican Republic 2011, Fernández competed in Reina Mundial del Banano 2009 in Machala, Ecuador on September 23, 2009. As the eventual first runner-up of the event, she won a crown made of 500 green pearls, tourmaline gemstones, and 700 crystals in a silver finish. Fernández studied for a bachelor's degree in psychology.

== Miss Dominican Republic 2011 ==
Fernández competed as the representative of Santiago, one of 36 finalists in her country's national beauty pageant, Miss Dominican Republic 2011, held in Santo Domingo on March 8, 2011, where she became the eventual winner of the title, gaining the right to represent the Dominican Republic at Miss Universe 2011.

== Miss Universe 2011 ==
Fernández represented the Dominican Republic at the Miss Universe 2011 pageant, held in São Paulo, Brazil on September 12, 2011, where she competed to succeed the outgoing titleholder, Ximena Navarrete of Mexico but failed to place in the semifinals.

Awards and achievements
Preceded by (Mexico) Karla Carrillo	Miss Continente Americano 1st Runner-Up; 2011	Succeeded by (Panama) Maricely González
Preceded by Eva Arias	Miss Dominican Republic; 2011	Succeeded by Carola Durán (Dethroned); Dulcita Lieggi (Successor)
Preceded by Alma Álvarez	Miss Continente Americano Dominican Republic; 2011	Succeeded by Carolyn Hawa
Preceded by Catherine Ramírez	Miss Santiago; 2011	Succeeded by Carolyn Hawa
Preceded by (Venezuela) Nailette Romero	Virreina Mundial del Banano; 2009	Succeeded by (Peru) Laura Spoya
