= El Ponton Airport =

- IATA: none; ICAO: MDEP

Summary
- Airport type: Aerodrome
- Location: La Vega Province
- Elevation AMSL: 498 ft / 156 m

Runways
Direction	Length		Surface
Direction	ft	m	Surface
	155	60	Unpathed

El Ponton Airport is located in La Vega Province, Dominican Republic and serves to general and private aviation. It can receive only bimotor aircraft because of it runway length.
