= Miss Dominican Republic 2011 =

- Date: March 8, 2011
- Presenters: Marianne Cruz; Jaime Augusto Mayol
- Entertainment: Vakero and Divino
- Venue: Renaissance Auditorio de Festival del Hotel Jaragua, Santo Domingo, Dominican Republic
- Broadcaster: Super Canal Caribe 211, Antena Latina, WAPA TV y Color Visión Canal 9
- Entrants: 36
- Placements: 15
- Winner: Dalia Fernández; Santiago

Miss Dominican Republic 2011 was held on March 8, 2011 at the Renaissance Auditorio de Festival del Hotel Jaragua in Santo Domingo, Dominican Republic.

Dalia Fernández of Santiago was crowned by Eva Arias of Espaillat at the end of the event. Fernández then represented her country in the Miss Universe 2011 pageant.

The first runner-up competed in Miss Continente Americano 2011, the second runner-up competed in Reina Hispanoamericana 2011, the third competed in Miss Supranational 2011, and the fourth runner-up competed in Miss Intercontinental 2011.

== Results ==
=== Placements ===
Placement	Contestant
Miss Dominican Republic 2011	Santiago – Dalia Fernández
1st Runner-Up	Santo Domingo Norte – Katherine Cruz
2nd Runner-Up	Distrito Nacional – Kirssi Abreu
3rd Runner-Up	Peravia – Evaida Santana
4th Runner-Up	El Seibo – Luz Aura Goico
Top 10	Hermanas Mirabal – Sally Aponte; Barahona – Judith Jiménez; San Pedro de Macorís – Ángela Mariano; Duarte – Irlandia Núñez; San Cristóbal – Cherry Jiménez
Top 15	Estados Unidos – Fátima Leonardo; Monte Cristi – Génesis Nouel; Samaná – Evíssiris Siskos; Puerto Rico – Georgina Pérez; Elías Piña – Jahnna Jones

== Contestants ==
Province	Contestant	Age	Height	Hometown
Azua	Ángela María Gutiérrez Cáceres	18	1.77 m (5 ft 9 3/4 in)	Azua de Compostela
Bahoruco	Carmen Victoria Goico Ortíz	21	1.75 m (5 ft 9 in)	Santa Cruz de El Seibo
Barahona	Judith Jiménez Álvarez	22	1.77 m (5 ft 9 3/4 in)	Santa Cruz de Barahona
Com. Dom. En Estados Unidos	Fátima Mabel Leonardo Suarèz	23	1.85 m (6 ft 3/4 in)	Providence
Com. Dom. En Puerto Rico	Georgina Daliza Pérez Mota	19	1.81 m (5 ft 11 1/4 in)	Carolina
Dajabón	Gabriela Ferreira de los Santos	22	1.70 m (5 ft 7 in)	Dajabón
Distrito Nacional	Kirssi Raquel Abreu Tineo	18	1.74 m (5 ft 8 1/2 in)	Santo Domingo
Duarte	Irlandia Brussel Núñez Ortega	18	1.70 m (5 ft 7 in)	San Francisco de Macorís
El Seibo	Luz Aura Goico Ortíz	19	1.69 m (5 ft 6 1/2 in)	Santa Cruz de El Seibo
Elías Piña	Jahnna Jones Ynoa	21	1.81 m (5 ft 11 1/4 in)	Los Alcarrizos
Espaillat	Alba Jiménez Reyes	21	1.77 m (5 ft 9 3/4 in)	Moca
Hato Mayor	Dania Ventura de los Santos	19	1.75 m (5 ft 9 in)	Hato Mayor del Rey
Hermanas Mirabal	Sally Lucía Aponte Tejada	19	1.79 m (5 ft 10 1/2 in)	Salcedo
Independencia	Dilegni María Pujols Reynoso	24	1.77 m (5 ft 9 3/4 in)	Santiago de los Caballeros
La Altagracia	Helena María García O'Rourke	21	1.83 m (6 ft 0 in)	Salvaleón de Higüey
La Romana	Eleonor Sofia Domínguez Santana	18	1.74 m (5 ft 8 1/2 in)	La Romana
La Vega	María Méndez Rodríguez	19	1.81 m (5 ft 11 1/4 in)	Concepción de La Vega
María Trinidad Sánchez	Katherine Argenia Villalona Mir	23	1.79 m (5 ft 10 1/2 in)	Nagua
Monseñor Nouel	Indiana Ortega Peña	18	1.72 m (5 ft 7 3/4 in)	Bonao
Monte Cristi	Génesis Carlina Nouel Baret	19	1.79 m (5 ft 10 1/2 in)	Santiago de los Caballeros
Monte Plata	Elpidia Rodríguez Raymond	20	1.79 m (5 ft 10 1/2 in)	Santo Domingo Este
Pedernales	Yasaida Ysabel Blanco Morán	18	1.77 m (5 ft 9 3/4 in)	Santo Domingo Este
Peravia	Evaida Lorena Santana Mateo	20	1.75 m (5 ft 9 in)	Baní
Puerto Plata	Anhyérica Jacqueline Paulino Cid	22	1.80 m (5 ft 10 3/4 in)	San Felipe de Puerto Plata
Samaná	Evíssiris "Eví Siskos" Cecilia Siskos Guzmán	22	1.75 m (5 ft 9 in)	Moca
San Cristóbal	Cherry Elizabeth Jiménez Jáquez	19	1.79 m (5 ft 10 1/2 in)	San Cristobal
San José de Ocoa	Pamela Dalmaú Rivera	19	1.72 m (5 ft 7 3/4 in)	Santiago de los Caballeros
San Juan	Wendy Stephania Polanco Peña	18	1.71 m (5 ft 7 1/4 in)	Santiago de los Caballeros
San Pedro de Macorís	Ángela Leidy Mariano Kostoulos	18	1.89 m (6 ft 2 1/2 in)	San Pedro de Macorís
Sánchez Ramírez	Esther Karen Díaz Hernández	22	1.78 m (5 ft 10 in)	Santiago de los Caballeros
Santiago	Dalia Cristina Fernández Sánchez	21	1.73 m (5 ft 8 in)	Santiago de los Caballeros
Santiago Rodríguez	Adielsie Fancy de la Rosa Bello	21	1.73 m (5 ft 8 in)	Los Alcarrizos
Santo Domingo Este	Elizabeth Lauren Turra Brower	20	1.82 m (5 ft 11 3/4 in)	Santo Domingo Este
Santo Domingo Norte	Katherine Cruz Varela	21	1.81 m (5 ft 11 1/4 in)	Santo Domingo Norte
Santo Domingo Oeste	Leydi Joreiy Madera Vargas	18	1.81 m (5 ft 11 1/4 in)	Pedro Brand
Valverde	Lourdes Madera Rodríguez	24	1.66 m (5 ft 5 1/4 in)	Esperanza
