= Ito Bisonó =

Dominican politician, businessman and diplomat (born 1963)

- Bisonó in 2026

Minister of Foreign Affairs of the Dominican Republic
- Incumbent
- Assumed office 16 August 2026
- President: Luis Abinader
- Preceded by: Roberto Álvarez

Minister of Housing, Habitat and Buildings of the Dominican Republic
- In office 6 January 2026 – 16 August 2026
- President: Luis Abinader
- Preceded by: Carlos Bonilla Sánchez
- Succeeded by: Jean Luis Rodríguez

Minister of Industry, Trade and MSMEs of the Dominican Republic
- In office 16 August 2020 – 6 January 2026
- President: Luis Abinader
- Preceded by: Nelson Toca Simó
- Succeeded by: Eduardo Sanz Lovatón

Deputy for the 2nd circunscription of Distrito Nacional
- In office 16 August 2002 – 16 August 2020

Personal details
- Born: Víctor Orlando Bisonó Haza; 27 August 1967 (age 59) Santo Domingo, Dominican Republic
- Party: Independent (2018–2019); Modern Revolutionary Party (2020–present)
- Other political affiliations: Social Christian Reformist Party (1986–2017)
- Spouse: Isabel María León Nouel
- Relations: Marcos Bisonó (brother); Oscar Haza (first cousin); Rita Indiana (second cousin); Alejandro Grullón (second cousin-once removed); Manuel Alejandro Grullón (third cousin); Manuel Rodríguez Objío (great-great-grandfather); Fernando Valerio (great-great-great grandfather)
- Children: Andrés Guillermo; Daniela Isabel; Diego Orlando
- Parents: Víctor Bisonó Pichardo (father); Ivonne Haza (mother)
- Education: Universidad Iberoamericana (Lic.); Universidad de la Tercera Edad (Lic.)
- Occupation: Politician; businessman; diplomat
- Profession: Business administrator
- Website: itobisono.com (in Spanish); Biography on the official website of the Ministry of Foreign Affairs of the Dominican Republic (in Spanish and English)

Víctor Orlando Bisonó Haza (born 27 August 1963), better known as Ito Bisonó, is a Dominican politician, businessman and diplomat. In August 16, 2026 he became the Minister of Foreign Affairs of the Dominican Republic, in the government of President Luis Abinader. And a former member of the Chamber of Deputies, representing the Second District of the National District from 2002 to 2020. Bisonó is a member of the Dominican-Haitian Chamber of Commerce; in 2009 he was its second vice president.

== Early life and education ==
Bisonó was born in Santo Domingo, and is the son of architect Victor Bisonó Pichardo, born into a prominent family (Note: The Bisonó family descends from Jean Bissonnet (d. 1817), his wife Marie Framingdano, and their child, Pierre Bissonnet (born in France in 1775). Pierre married twice, first to Marie-Joséphine Sanout and later to Marie Thami. The Bissonnet were landowners in Gonaïves, Saint-Domingue (currently Haiti) and had to flee amid a massacre against whites to San José de las Matas, in the then-French-administered Santo Domingo (currently the Dominican Republic). Pierre had 1 child with the former: María Josefa (born in Gonaïves, died 1896 in San José de las Matas); with the latter he had 4 children: Pedro Luys (1805–1853), Ana (1806–1886), Miguel (?), Pedro Antonio (1807–1882), all born in San José de las Matas; his father died in 1817, in San José de las Matas. Some children of Miguel and Pedro Luys Bisonó moved from San José de las Matas and established in what today is known as “Villa Bisonó”, and became wealthy farmers and traders, and eventually a prominent family.) from Villa Bisonó in Santiago, and Ivonne Haza (b. 1938), a native of Ingenio Angelina (a locality part of San Pedro de Macorís). He completed grade school at Colegio Santa Teresita and his undergraduate studies at the Universidad Iberoamericana (UNIBE), achieving his degree in Business Management. He also completed some courses in Engineering at the Universidad Nacional Pedro Henríquez Ureña.

Bisonó is descended from Domingo Daniel Pichardo, Vice President of the Dominican Republic from 1857 to 1858, and Fernando Valerio, who is considered a hero of the Battle of Santiago (1844).

Bisonó is a first cousin of journalist Oscar Haza, a second cousin of writer and artist Rita Indiana, and is related to the bankers of the Grullón family: Alejandro Grullón, Manuel Alejandro Grullón, and Manuel Grullón Hernández. Bisonó is a descendant of national heroes Manuel Nemesio Rodríguez Objío (great-great-grandson) and Fernando Valerio (great-great-grandson), and is also a descendant of Dominican Vice President Domingo Daniel Pichardo (great-great-grandson).

He completed his primary and secondary education at the Santa Teresita School in that city, and his university studies were completed at the Universidad Iberoamericana (UNIBE), where he graduated with a degree in Business Administration. He took courses in Civil Engineering at the Universidad Nacional Pedro Henríquez Ureña. In addition, he graduated with a degree in Political Science from the Universidad de la Tercera Edad.

== Entering politics ==
Despite having close ties to the Dominican Revolutionary Party, because his mother, Ivonne Haza, was a singing instructor for then-President Antonio Guzmán Fernández, Ito developed a conservative fiscal policy in repudiation of the practices of irresponsible indebtedness and lack of control of public spending incurred by the Dominican governments of that time. From a young age, he saw former President Joaquín Balaguer as a reliable and viable alternative, which was why he joined the Christian Social Reformist Youth (JRSC).

Among his fellow political activists at that time were Milton Ginebra, Leoncio Almanzar, Fausto Jaquez, Sergia Elena Mejia, Juan Luis Seliman, Aristides Fernandez Zucco and Silvestre de Moya, among many other young people. Most of them, like Bisono Haza, came from the Dominican middle and upper middle class, which served to give the PRSC a new image with these young leaders who became the heart of the party from the opposition.

In 1986, together with his fellow JRSC members, Ito introduced the Vice Presidential candidate Carlos Morales Troncoso, who at the time was an outsider, to the grassroots reformists. This was where the relationship between the two national leaders began.

== Public service ==
Bisonó has held numerous positions in public administration. Among these, he was assistant to the Minister of Public Works Marcos Subero, whom he later followed to the then Dominican Electricity Corporation and then to the Foreign Investment Promotion Council in the Dominican Republic (CPI) and to finish this first stage of 11 years as a member of the Board of Directors of Marmolería Nacional Dominicana.

== Legislative career ==
Following a restructuring of the Reformist Party, Ito assumed the role of Vice President of the National District Board of the party. From this position, together with the President of the Board, Héctor Marte, he received great national attention, which opened the possibility that in 1990 he would formalize for the first time his aspirations to an elective office: that of Deputy for Santo Domingo, which was not yet divided into constituencies.

He remained politically active and thus again launched his aspirations for the Chamber of Deputies in the elections of 2002, now with the modality of the open list or preferential vote. With the National District divided into three constituencies, he had to compete in the second one where he was the third most voted candidate by obtaining 4,667 votes in a universe of 60,000. That is, 7%, behind the 18% obtained by the veteran politician Alfredo Pacheco and the 11% of the candidate of the Dominican Liberation Party. He was above all the other candidates of these parties. Thus, on August 16, he was sworn in as a deputy.

The expanded Reformist Party bloc (it grew from 17 to 37 Deputies) chose him as its party's spokesperson in the Lower House.

In his first year he stood out so much that by 2003 he was already seen as a possible President of the Chamber of Deputies and thus aspired to succeed the then incumbent Lila Alburquerque. However, internal rivalries between the various factions of the ruling PRD led Pacheco to that position.

Among these, his great support for youth stands out, which has been demonstrated by his contributions to groups such as Pro-Youth, the Youth Parliament (of which he is the founder and Consultative President), the Club of Political Ideas of the Pontifical Catholic University Madre y Maestra, as well as the sponsorship of academic trips for students from different Dominican universities. He was recognized by the Ministry of Youth as an outstanding young politician in 2004.

From Congress he has promoted laws such as No. 170-07, which establishes the Municipal Participatory Budget; No. 57-07 on Incentives for the Development of Renewable Energy Sources and their Special Regimes; No. 171-07, which grants Special Incentives to Pensioners and Foreign Source Annuitants; No. 392-07 on Competitiveness and Industrial Innovation; No. 479-08 on Commercial Companies and Individual Limited Liability Companies.

He has also taken the initiative in projects such as the Bill on Public Works and Services Concessions, the Bill on Commercial Restructuring and Judicial Liquidation, the Bill on Incentives for Private Maritime Tourism in the Dominican Republic, the Bill creating the State Secretariat for Housing, Human Settlements and Buildings, the Bill creating the General Directorate of Arms Control (DIGECA), attached to the State Ministry of the Interior and Police in coordination with the Ministry of the Armed Forces, with the aim of establishing, controlling, managing, obtaining and granting permits for the carrying and possession of firearms, ammunition, explosives and other related materials throughout the national territory. 7

For the 2006 elections, many sectors within and outside the reformist party called for his candidacy for the Senate of the National District, but in pursuit of party unity, he refused to present himself as a candidate for Senator and aspired to a second term as deputy. On this occasion, he managed to double the number of votes obtained in 2002, now obtaining 8,579.

In 2010, he was re-elected again and ended up being the candidate with the most votes from the alliance that nominated him for the Lower House. He was sworn in for a third term that would exceptionally be 6 years due to the constitutional reform that sought the unification of the Dominican elections for the year 2016 on the same date.

== Environmental work ==
Because of his role in defending the environment of the Dominican Republic, Bisonó has become the representative of eco-friendly Dominicans in Congress. He has sponsored many events to decrease pollution, fumigate areas affected by infested lagoons, tree planting sprees as well as presenting many comprehensive pieces of legislation concerning environmental conservation and climate change.

== Laws ==
Among the most notable laws he promoted are:

- Law No. 57-07 on Incentives for the Development of Renewable Energy Sources and their Special Regimes
- Law No. 392-07 on Industrial Competitiveness and Innovation
- Law No. 479-08 on Commercial Companies and Individual Limited Liability Companies
- Law No. 170-07 that Institutes the Municipal Participatory Budget
- Law No. 171-07 Granting Special Incentives to Pensioners and Annuitants from Foreign Sources
- Public-Private Partnerships Act
- Weapons Law

== Role within the PRSC (1896-2017) ==
Within the Social Christian Reformist Party he has held positions such as Vice President of the National District Board, Member of the Central Executive Board, Member of the National Restructuring Commission and the Advisory and Cooperation Commission of the 20, Member of the Executive Commission and is a member of the Permanent Presidential Commission.

In 2007 he supported the candidacy of Engineer Eduardo Estrella and joined the campaign as finance manager. However, after a new controversy that ended with Estrella's departure to form a new party, the deputy remained in the party that, with the elected candidate, Amable Aristy Castro, was reduced to its lowest point in the 2008 presidential elections.

In 2020, Bisonó decided to join the Modern Revolutionary Party (PRM). Since then, he has been an active member of the PRM Executive Directorate.

== Management as Minister of Industry, Commerce, and MSMEs ==
Since taking office as Minister of Industry, Commerce, and MSMEs in August 2020, Ito Bisonó has led a number of key initiatives.

Under the direction of Ito Bisonó, the Ministry of Industry, Commerce, and MSMEs (MICM) played a crucial role in the expansion and strengthening of free trade zones in the Dominican Republic. 302 permits were issued for the installation of companies in these zones, with a projection of creating 46,022 direct jobs and an estimated investment of US$651 million. These companies, which operate under the free trade zone regime, generate foreign exchange earnings of around US$599 million.

As an active member of the Dominican-Haitian Chamber of Commerce, where he served as second vice president in 2009, Bisonó worked to strengthen trade ties between the Dominican Republic and Haiti.

== Political thought ==
Ito Bisonó is the founder and president of the Center for Public Policy Analysis (CAPP), an organization that has been instrumental in promoting debates on issues such as geopolitics, economic development, immigration, security and technology in the Caribbean region.

== Personal life ==
He is married to Isabel "Chabela" León Nouel, daughter of industrialist Carlos Guillermo León Asensio (1926–2009) and Mercedes 'Yin' Nouel Victoria (b. 1932), with whom he has had various children. Isabel is niece of José León Asensio, granddaughter of Eduardo León Jimenes and Carlos Tomás Nouel y Bobadilla, and therefore grandniece of Adolfo Alejandro Nouel y Bobadilla.

=== Ancestors ===
Ancestors of Ito Bisonó

16. Joseph Estanislao 'Juan' Bisonó Muñoz (b. 1840, m. 1871, d. 1900)
8. Juan Caridad Bisonó Checo (b. 1872, d. 1969)
17. María Caridad Checo Rodríguez (m. 1871)
4. Gustavo Nery Bisonó Fernández (b. 1899, d. 1949)
Juan Fernández
9. Agapita Fernández Castro
2. Víctor Gustavo Bisonó Pichardo (b. 1933, m. 1961, d. 2017)
20. Rodolfo Ramón Pichardo Román (b. 1847, m. 1870, d. 1927; son of Domingo Daniel Pichardo)
10. Florencio Rodolfo Pichardo Valerio (b. 1881, m. 1907, d. 1959)
21. Juana Francisca Valerio Suriel (b. 1853, m. 1870, d. 1944; daughter of Fernando Valerio)
5. Rosa Pichardo Corona (b. 1908, m. 1931, d. 1983)
22. Ramón Corona
11. Rosa Corona Collado (b. 1877, m. 1907, d. 1964)
23. María Collado
1. Víctor Orlando Bisonó Haza (b. 1963)
6. Luis Felipe Haza González
3. Sara María Ivonne Haza del Castillo (b. 1938, m. 1961)
28. Benigno (Ruiz) del Castillo
14. Luis Temístocles del Castillo García (1854–1922)
29. Gabina García Perdomo
7. Rita Indiana del Castillo y Rodríguez-Objío
30. Manuel Rodríguez Objío
15. Dolores Eloísa Rodríguez-Objío Reyes (1867–1941)
31. Rita Altagracia Reyes García
