= Tentacle (disambiguation) =

In zoology, a tentacle is a flexible, mobile, elongated organ present in some species of animals.

Tentacle or Tentacles may also refer to:

- Tentacle erotica, a type of pornography
- Tentacle (botany), glandular hairs on the leaves of some species of insectivorous plants such as sundews
- Tentacles (film), an Italian-American horror film
- Tentacle (novel), a 2015 novel by Rita Indiana
- Tentacles (album), a 2009 album by Crystal Antlers
- Tentacles (novel), a 2009 novel by Roland Smith
- Squidward Tentacles, a fictional character in the American animated television series SpongeBob SquarePants
- "Tentacles" (Into the Dark), an episode of the second season of Into the Dark
