= Haza =

Haza may refer to:

== Places ==
- Haza, Province of Burgos, a town in Castile and León, Spain

== People ==
- Ahmed Muhammed Haza Al Darbi (born 1975), Saudi Arabian prisoner at Guantanamo Bay
- Hisui Haza (born 1996), Japanese footballer
- Ivonne Haza (1938–2022), Dominican soprano
- Ofra Haza (1957–2000), Israeli singer
- Óscar Haza (born 1951), American journalist
- Plutarco Haza (born 1972), Mexican actor

== Science ==
- Haza (butterfly), a genus of skipper butterflies in the subtribe Moncina

== See also ==
- Paolo de la Haza (born 1983), Peruvian footballer
- Marta Hazas (born 1977), Spanish actress
