= Metafiction =

Genre of fiction about fiction

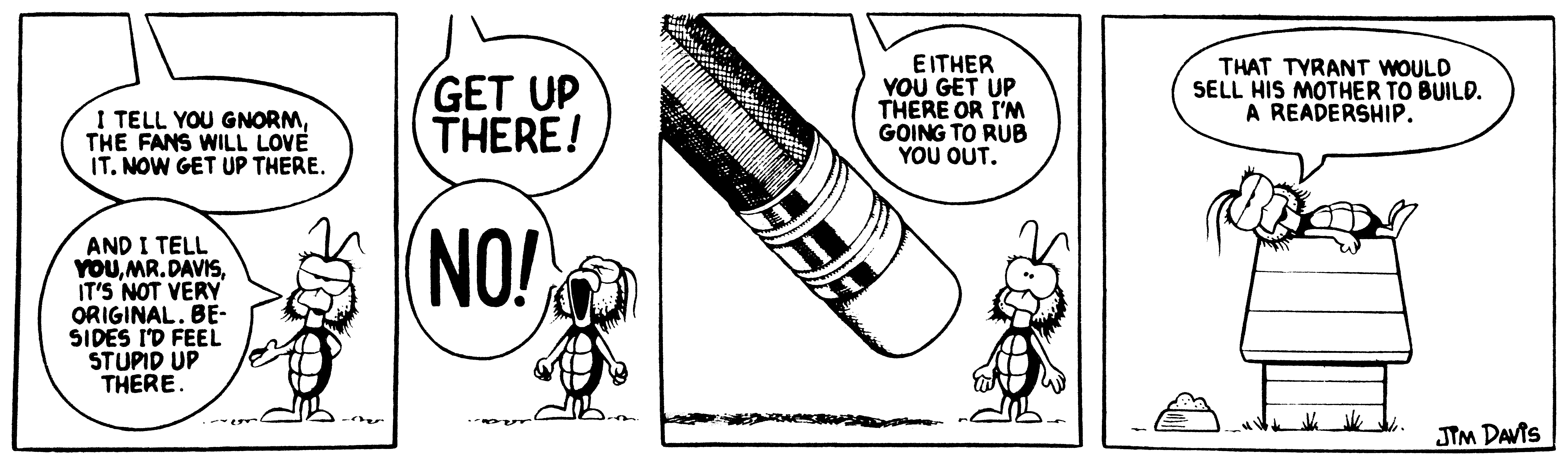
A Gnorm Gnat comic in which the titular character talks to his artist, Jim Davis, and acknowledges the strip's lack of popularity relative to Peanuts.

Metafiction is a form of fiction that emphasizes its own narrative structure in a way that inherently reminds the audience that they are reading or viewing a fictional work. Metafiction is self-conscious about language, literary form, and storytelling, and works of metafiction directly or indirectly draw attention to their status as artifacts. Metafiction is frequently used as a form of parody or a tool to undermine literary conventions and explore the relationship between literature and reality, life and art.

Although metafiction is most commonly associated with postmodern literature that developed in the mid-20th century, its use can be traced back to much earlier works of fiction, such as The Canterbury Tales (Geoffrey Chaucer, 1387), Don Quixote Part Two (Miguel de Cervantes, 1615), Chymical Wedding of Christian Rosenkreutz (Johann Valentin Andreae, 1617), The Cloud Dream of the Nine (Kim Man-jung, 1687), The Life and Opinions of Tristram Shandy, Gentleman (Laurence Sterne, 1759), Dream of the Red Chamber (Cao Xueqin, 1791), Sartor Resartus (Thomas Carlyle, 1833–34), and Vanity Fair (William Makepeace Thackeray, 1847).

Metafiction became particularly prominent in the 1960s, with works such as Lost in the Funhouse by John Barth, Pale Fire by Vladimir Nabokov, "The Babysitter" and "The Magic Poker" by Robert Coover, Slaughterhouse-Five by Kurt Vonnegut, The French Lieutenant's Woman by John Fowles, The Crying of Lot 49 by Thomas Pynchon, and Willie Master's Lonesome Wife by William H. Gass.

Since the 1980s, contemporary Latino literature has an abundance of self-reflexive, metafictional works, including novels and short stories by Junot Díaz (The Brief Wondrous Life of Oscar Wao), Sandra Cisneros (Caramelo), Salvador Plascencia (The People of Paper), Carmen Maria Machado (Her Body and Other Parties), Rita Indiana (Tentacle), and Valeria Luiselli (Lost Children Archive).

Also in Latin America, but much earlier, Ecuadorian writer Pablo Palacio published his experimental novella Débora in October 1927. Some of the techniques he employed in the book include stream of consciousness and metafiction.

A prominent video game example of metafiction is The Stanley Parable, which explores video game story-telling structures and tropes, and in particular the relationship between the creator and the player, frequently breaking the fourth wall by directly commenting on it.

== History of the term ==
The term 'metafiction' was coined in 1970 by William H. Gass in his book Fiction and the Figures of Life. Gass describes the increasing use of metafiction at the time as a result of authors developing a better understanding of the medium. This new understanding of the medium led to a major change in the approach toward fiction. Theoretical issues became more prominent aspects, resulting in increased self-reflexivity and formal uncertainty. Robert Scholes expands upon Gass's theory and identifies four forms of criticism on fiction, which he refers to as formal, behavioural, structural, and philosophical criticism. Metafiction assimilates these perspectives into the fictional process, putting emphasis on one or more of these aspects.

These developments were part of a larger movement (arguably a meta referential turn) which, approximately from the 1960s onwards, was the consequence of an increasing social and cultural self-consciousness, stemming from, as Patricia Waugh puts it, "a more general cultural interest in the problem of how human beings reflect, construct and mediate their experience in the world."

Due to this development, an increasing number of novelists rejected the notion of rendering the world through fiction. The new principle became to create through the medium of language a world that does not reflect the real world. Language was considered an "independent, self-contained system which generates its own 'meanings.'" and a means of mediating knowledge of the world. Thus, literary fiction, which constructs worlds through language, became a model for the construction of 'reality' rather than a reflection of it. Reality itself became regarded as a construct instead of objective truth. Through its formal self-exploration, metafiction thus became the device that explores the question of how human beings construct their experience of the world.

Robert Scholes identifies the time around 1970 as the peak of experimental fiction (of which metafiction is an instrumental part) and names a lack of commercial and critical success as reasons for its subsequent decline. The development toward metafictional writing in postmodernism generated mixed responses. Some critics argued that it signified the decadence of the novel and an exhaustion of the artistic capabilities of the medium, with some going as far as to call it the 'death of the novel'. Others see the self-consciousness of fictional writing as a way to gain a deeper understanding of the medium and a path that leads to innovation that resulted in the emergence of new forms of literature, such as the historiographic novel by Linda Hutcheon.

Video games also started to draw on concepts of metafiction, particularly with the rise of independent video games in the 2010s. Games like The Magic Circle, The Beginner's Guide, and Pony Island use various techniques as to have the player question the bounds between the fiction of the video game and the reality of them playing the game.

== Forms ==
According to Werner Wolf, metafiction can be differentiated into four pairs of forms that can be combined with each other.

=== Explicit and implicit ===
Explicit metafiction is identifiable through its use of clear metafictional elements on the surface of a text. It comments on its own artificiality and is quotable. Explicit metafiction is described as a mode of telling. An example would be a narrator explaining the process of creating the story they are telling.

Rather than commenting on the text, implicit metafiction foregrounds the medium or its status as an artifact through various, for example disruptive, techniques such as metalepsis. It relies more than other forms of metafiction on the reader's ability to recognize these devices to evoke a metafictional reading. Implicit metafiction is described as a mode of showing.

=== Direct and indirect ===
Direct metafiction establishes a reference within the text one is just reading. Contrarily, indirect metafiction consists in metareferences external to this text, such as reflections on other specific literary works or genres (as in parodies) and general discussions of an aesthetic issue. Since there is always a relationship between the text in which indirect metafiction occurs and the referenced external texts or issues, indirect metafiction always impacts the text one is reading, albeit in an indirect way.

=== Critical and non-critical ===
Critical metafiction aims to find the artificiality or fictionality of a text in some critical way, which is frequently done in postmodernist fiction. Non-critical metafiction does not criticize or undermine the artificiality or fictionality of a text and can, for example, be used to "suggest that the story one is reading is authentic".

== See also ==
- Fourth wall
- Found manuscript
- V-Effekt (Alienation Effect)
- List of metafictional works
- Postmodernism
