= Manuel Rodríguez Objío =

Dominican poet and politician (1838–1871)

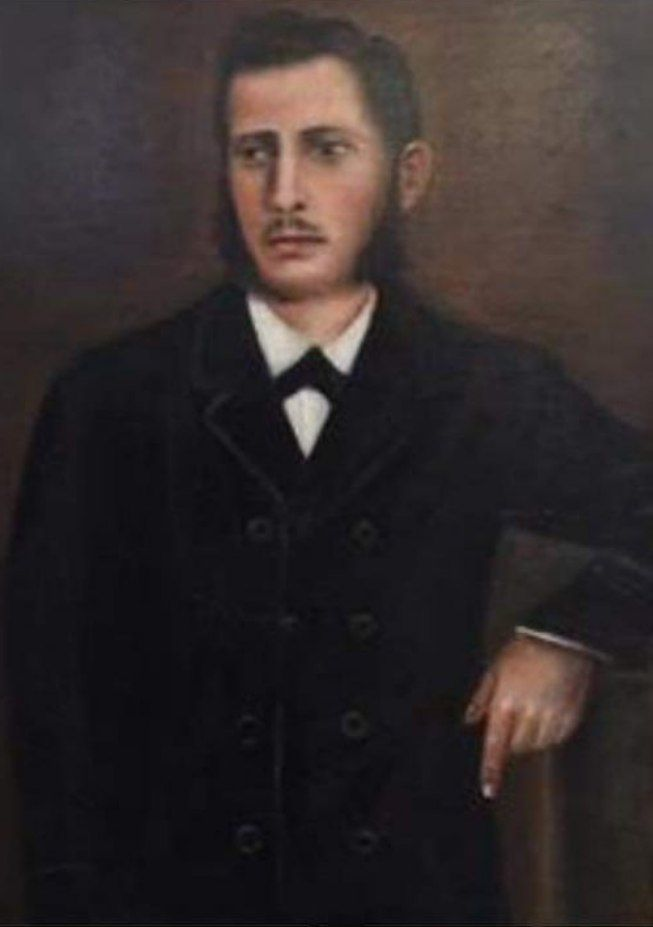
- Oil portrait of Manuel Rodríguez Objío
- Born: 19 December 1838; Santo Domingo, Dominican Republic
- Died: 18 April 1871 (aged 32); Santo Domingo, Dominican Republic
- Cause of death: Execution by firing squad
- Occupations: Author, Poet, revolutionary
- Parents: Andrés Rodríguez (father); Bernarda Objío (mother)

Brigadier General Manuel Nemesio Rodríguez Objío (19 December 1838 – 18 April 1871) was a Dominican poet and activist. A martyr of the Six Years' War, he was one of the early contributors to Dominican literature.

He fought in the Dominican War of Independence, the Cibaeño Revolution and the Dominican Restoration War. He founded the newspaper "La Voz del Cibao" in Santiago. He published several poems in the Sociedad Amigos del País Magazine. He was shot by order of Buenaventura Báez during the Six Years' War period, in the Ozama Fortress in Santo Domingo, on 18 April 1871.

== Early life ==
=== Family life ===
Objío was born in Santo Domingo on 19 December 1838 into a middle-class white family of Spanish heritage. His parents were Bernardina Objío Noble (1814–1893) and Andrés Rodríguez Rodríguez (c. 1810–1843). He was born on 19 December 1838 in the city of Santo Domingo, a few months after the formation of the secret society, La Trinitaria. His parents' home was on the southwest corner of El Conde and José Reyes streets. The location of his house hints that his parents, Andrés Rodríguez and Bernarda Objío (possibly born in Venezuela), belonged to the middle and upper urban strata. The civil registry documents support this, since Andrés Rodríguez appears in them as a "retail merchant." Some of the Trinitarios were friends of the family, which indicates that the boy Rodríguez Objío grew up under the influence of Juan Pablo Duarte's teachings.

At the time, everything was surrounded by difficulties, since the country was extremely poor and even the upper urban sectors lived in the midst of enormous precariousness. This situation worsened as a result of the premature death of Andrés Rodríguez, in February 1843, after having had two other children and a fourth daughter still to be born. The young widow was forced to go to Azua, where her family was, in order to dedicate herself to commercial activities. Bernarda Objío had experience helping her husband, and her first-born Manuel, still a child, had to participate in the search for subsistence at home. From there would come a vocation for business that he did not develop because of his strong literary interest. As he narrates in Relationships, he suffered several failures in commercial activities, which explains his social environment where the success of a company of any kind was difficult.

Of those first years, under Haitian rule, his friend and fellow poet, José Joaquín Pérez, refers:

As it is an inherent condition of every conquering nation to stop the flight of intelligence, placing obstacles to the enlightenment of the masses, Manuel R. Objío had the misfortune of not receiving any education. He spent his childhood in that limitless vagueness of a life of dangerous idleness. Precocious in daring conceptions, in the small circle of his family he could easily learn something that would help him acquire for himself the most indispensable notions and when he reached the age of six his progress was prodigious.

=== Early activities ===
At the age of 13, Rodríguez Objío returned to Santo Domingo to take a position as a shop assistant. In his own words, he led a lazy life and surrounded himself with "bad company," getting drunk a few times. On a trip to Azua, while a card game was in progress, the spark from one of the players' cigars caused the gunpowder keg on which he was sitting to explode. Rodríguez Objío was one of the few who did not lose their lives, which made him think that his life was sealed by a destiny. Despite this wayward existence, he began to attend the San Buenaventura school as a student, founded by President Buenaventura Báez during his first administration. During those times he was able to draw on the knowledge of some of the few cultural luminaries of the time, such as Félix María del Monte and Alejandro Angulo Guridi. Soon he began to write poetry, inspired by the work and exploits of Lord Byron. In 1855, when he was just 16 years old, he published his first poem, dedicated to "a young poetess." So, as he said years later, he was already a romantic spirit:

[…] my heart overflowed with love for the whole world, women seemed to me like angels, friendship a goddess, the Homeland an Eden. I felt too much and stifled my feelings too much; When I wanted to expand them, not finding the world I dreamed of, I cursed my destiny and threw myself into an endless struggle.

Upon returning from an eventful trip to New York in the company of a merchant who had carried out irregular transactions, a trip that he himself described as a disaster, in March 1856 he was appointed official in the Ministry of Finance by the incumbent, Manuel Delmonte, a friend of his family and member of Pedro Santana's circle. At the age of 17, he began a career in positions in the State that would generate internal conflicts. In reality, in accordance with his intellectual vocation, he was interested in contributing to the search for solutions to national problems. Together with other writers, such as his great friend Juan Bautista Zafra, he founded the Sociedad Amantes de las Letras, which he conceived as a space for reflection that would affect the problems that conservative politicians could not address. He presented his resignation shortly after being appointed, taking advantage of Santana's departure from power, and returned to Azua for a certain time.

The Cibaeño Revolution in 1857 found him in the city of Santo Domingo, where he had established a small business distilling beverages in the company of the poet Manuel Heredia. He was forced to fight on the Baecista side, under the command of General José María Cabral. But as soon as he could, he went over to Santiago's side, which maintained the siege of the walled city. In those months he established a relationship with General Santana, head of the besieging troops, who, upon noticing the talent of the young poet, appointed him part of his General Staff, despite the suspicion that his liberal ideas caused him. When the fourth and last Santana government was established, Rodríguez Objío was appointed first official of the Ministry of the Interior and Police, but he soon resigned. His already defined liberal inclinations led him to equally repudiate the two political leaders of the time, Santana and Báez.

He preferred to get involved in the reorganization of the Society of Lovers of Letters, in order to contribute to a type of collective action that put patriotism before any personal or group interest. As part of this cultural activism, he collaborated in the city's main newspapers, especially Flores del Ozama. Whether due to political differences or personal rivalries between writers, he was bitterly fought within this cenacle, which generated a feeling of disappointment. It is likely that the attacks to which he was subjected came from conservative writers who had joined the entity, such as Manuel de Jesús Galván.

From then on, his life would oscillate between the grandiose will to act in pursuit of the ideal and the passivity caused by disappointment. Unemployed and disconnected from literary society, he returned to Azua in 1860, in order to carry out commercial operations, just before the border rebellion in favor of Haiti led by General Domingo Ramírez and other figures of the Dominican army occurred. Santana settled in Azua to crush dissidence and took the young Rodríguez Objío as his personal secretary, who abandoned the position after three months when Santana returned to Santo Domingo.

== Dominican Restoration War ==
As soon as he was certain that Santana planned to annex the island to the Spanish monarchy, Rodríguez Objío went to Saint Thomas to meet with the exiled Francisco del Rosario Sánchez, who symbolized the spirit of national self-determination and equality. There is a version, not supported by him, that he was sent by conservative politicians who wanted to prevent the annexation to Spain. While informing the founder of the Republic of Santana's plans, he offered to fight them. In Relations, he remembers having told Sánchez that, despite the aversion he felt towards Báez, he preferred any ruler to foreign domination. The long-awaited meeting with the hero of national ideals generated a perennial veneration of his memory. "From that moment," he said, "my fate was linked to his; and even after his death, I was faithful to my promises." Rodriguez Objío would go on to write several pieces voicing his admiration for Sánchez, whom he would emulate and idolize and for the rest of his life.

Rodríguez Objío returned to Santo Domingo, so he did not accompany Sánchez on the expedition he led from Haiti, which culminated in his execution in July 1861. Seeing that the opposition to the annexation did not prosper, he decided to wait, convinced that the people would end up rebelling. In the meantime, Rodríguez Objío married María del Rosario Ravelo, sister of the Trinitarian Juan Nepomuceno Ravelo, who had inspired his youthful verses. He soon experienced disappointment in his passion, although he decided not to divorce. Years later, he met Rita Reyes in Santiago, who became the love of his life. He had children with both women and maintained the relationship until his death.

A few days after the Dominican Restoration War began, Rodríguez Objío fled to Venezuela in order to join the patriots. Given that his repudiation of the foreign regime was in the public domain and he was subject to police surveillance, he determined that it would not be feasible for him to travel to Santiago by land. He says that he was the first inhabitant of the capital who decided to join the insurgents. He stopped in Curaçao, where he met his relative Manuel Ezequiel Bruzual, leader of the liberal current that then predominated in Venezuela.

As in later quotes by Rodríguez Objío, slight modifications have been introduced to make them more readable. Venezuelan President Juan Crisostomo Falcón, gave aid to the Dominican revolutionaries. In Caracas, he joined the group formed by General Juan Pablo Duarte, in order to join the war, bringing resources from that country. Rodríguez Objío received the rank of colonel from Duarte, and both, along with Vicente Celestino Duarte and Mariano Diez, Duarte's brother and uncle, and the Venezuelan Candelario Oquendo, left Venezuela on 2 March 1864 and arrived in Monte Cristi on 25 March.

Almost immediately Rodríguez Objío was assigned to assist General Manuel María Castillo in the reorganization of the front of the southern region, after the setbacks inflicted on the patriots by the Spanish troops due to the mistakes of the previous leader, Pedro Florentino. On that front, where danger and extreme misery abounded, he distinguished himself by carrying out risky missions. He was concerned about establishing communication points with Haiti, the only means to obtain weapons and other essential items. He was appointed chief of the front staff and at times temporarily held the command of operations. He established himself as the warrior of freedom that he aspired to be, although he was already experiencing doubts about the relevance of the action.

Castillo's successor as southern leader, José María Cabral, asked him to go to Santiago for help. In this city he was surprised by the movement that led to the dismissal of President José Antonio Salcedo and the proclamation of the head of the army, Gaspar Polanco, as president with dictatorial powers. This evolution was caused by what several leaders considered stopping the war because of the president's military errors, as well as by his willingness to reach an agreement with the Spanish and promote the return of Buenaventura Báez to the supreme leadership of the country, who He had surprised many by accepting the rank of field marshal of the Spanish army. Rodríguez Objío himself had the opportunity to participate in the conversations that were held in Monte Cristi between Captain General José de la Gándara and a delegation from the government of Santiago, after this city was occupied by the Spanish army. Whether because he was convinced of Salcedo's errors or because of the radical vocation of Gaspar Polanco, Rodríguez Objío supported the actions of the latter, whose revolutionary dictatorship lasted just over three months.

In Polanco's cabinet he was appointed Minister of Foreign Affairs, although his real contribution lay in directing the government newspaper and writing a large part of the official documents of those months. The pen of the Restoration was made, precisely when the national conflict reached its zenith and the radical positions in pursuit of an autonomous and democratic national order were defined from the top of the government. Although the dominant figure of such orientation was Vice President Ulises Francisco Espaillat, the literary work of systematically exposing arguments fell to Rodríguez Objío. He was impressed by the honesty and firmness of purpose of the vice president, from whom he received some of the political guidance that most marked him.

During the months of the Polanco dictatorship, the Spanish counteroffensive that had put the Dominicans in a difficult situation was contained. After preparing the evacuation of Santiago, after the capture of Monte Cristi, the Dominicans immobilized the Spanish army a few kilometers beyond the latter city. On the southern front, Cabral's military expertise was demonstrated in the Battle of La Canela, on 5 December 1864, when the Spanish and Dominican annexationist troops, under the command of Eusebio Puello, were defeated and the a new advance by restaurateurs throughout the region. Once this task of the Polanco government was fulfilled, new disagreements began in the restorative ranks, both due to disordered aspirations for command and due to different conceptions about the political order and the conduct of the war.

President Polanco was blamed for the execution of his predecessor José Antonio Salcedo, which was cited by several generals of the Northwest Line as a reason for his overthrow. In January 1865, Pedro Antonio Pimentel was appointed third president of the Restoration, and those who had accompanied the deposed Polanco, among whom was Rodríguez Objío, were reduced to prison. Since they were not found responsible for Salcedo's death, almost all of them were released two months later, and Rodríguez Objío was assigned again to the south, where he accompanied General Cabral in the final phase of the operations and the occupation of the city of Santo Domingo.

Both in the Polanco government ministry and as Cabral's advisor, Rodríguez Objío was the one who had the clearest vision of the need for the patriots to consolidate into an entity that was called the National Party. Although Polanco, the most radical of the restoration military leaders, accepted the idea and repeatedly referred to said party, in reality it never came to exist, because the conditions were still lacking. It must be taken into account that most of the restoring military leaders lacked any notion of modern politics. Although these warriors had to abide by the government's guidelines, intellectuals and politicians lacked the strength to bring them under control.

== Post-Restoration War ==
=== Decline of liberalism ===
Cabral occupied the presidency of the Republic a month after Spanish troops evacuated Santo Domingo, following a statement made in the city by several generals from the south and east, who questioned the Cibaeño preponderance represented by President Pimentel. He also received the title of Protector, in recognition of his brilliant military leadership. It was alleged shortly after that the intellectual inspiration of said movement was Rodríguez Objío, something that he himself took it upon himself to deny. The months of Cabral's first presidency were a kind of golden interregnum, despite the destruction in which the country had been left after the prolonged war. The circles of educated young people were confident that a promising future was opening up. The most important expression of this illusion was the Constituent Assembly convened to promulgate a new fundamental law of the State that would enable a democratic order, replacing the Constitution of 1854 that legalized despotism.

Rodríguez Objío was commissioned by Cabral to organize the government, and was later appointed Minister of Justice, Public Instruction and Foreign Relations. The inclusion of Rodríguez Objío highlighted the restorative origin of this first Cabral administration, despite the president's interest in surrounding himself with conservative figures and obtaining the support of the high commercial establishment. Cabral placed his trust in Juan Ramón Fiallo, who imposed a conservative orientation, and appointed Pedro Valverde to the Ministry of War, which determined the departure of Rodríguez Objío from the government. The old Santanistas and Baecistas, according to Relations, disputed hegemony in the government, so Rodríguez Objío and other restaurateurs lost influence. Probably because of the advance of the conservatives in the government, he asked the president to appoint him head of the southern region. There he caught the intrigues that the supporters of Buenaventura Báez were starting and tried to oppose them, although without too much belligerence, which denotes the precariousness in which the restaurateurs operated in power and the speed with which Báez's prestige was recovered, despite having supported the annexation.

As part of this situation, Rodríguez Objío agreed to be elected representative of Bánica to the Constituent Assembly, at the request of Carlos Báez, brother of Buenaventura Báez, who was carrying out a promotion campaign in Azua. Disappointed by the rising prestige of the inveterate annexationist, he decided for the first time to leave politics and dedicate himself to the practice of law, for which he obtained the appointment of public defender. He realized that the majority of the people did not support the liberal proposal. Even so, as on subsequent occasions, he retraced his steps and accepted the challenge of patriotism, once again occupying a government ministry at the request of the President, who renewed his confidence in him.

In that context, the rebellion in favor of Báez of several leaders from the east who had led the Restoration war in the area. Its leader was Pedro Guillermo, who ended up occupying the country's capital without Cabral being able to gather the strength to resist him. The president himself was forced to travel to Curacao to ask Báez to agree to replace him as president of the Republic. Gregorio Luperón and Benito Monción tried to oppose the reinstatement of Báez, but they did not achieve many adhesions, a sign of the state of mind that existed in the country, the divisions existing at the top of the restaurateurs, and the rising popularity that Báez had thanks to being recognized by many as the only one endowed with the capacity to govern the nation. Showing signs of his proverbial cunning, Báez appointed a cabinet made up of former leaders of the Restoration, such as Cabral himself, Minister of War, and Pimentel, Minister of the Interior. Rodríguez Objío decided to accept the president's assignment to be his delegate in the provinces of Cibao, with the mission of warding off foreseeable new outbreaks of opposition. The reasons why he accepted the appointment were explained some time later:

My mission to Cibao had the special purpose of fighting my true friends and coreligionists, the men of the National Party. The instructions transmitted to me were explicit, fully consistent with the power with which I was invested. I did not believe I should use the weapon that was placed in my hands to annihilate my people. […] The force of the principle triumphed over the so-called Military Duty, which is sometimes a tyranny against conscience, irrational, and therefore unjust […].

He had enough power to place people he trusted in relevant positions. Shortly after, the government appointed him governor of Puerto Plata, an important responsibility because in this city nearly two-thirds of the country's taxes were collected.

=== Widthdrawal of Baecism ===
Soon, concern began to spread among the leaders of the Restoration because they noticed the despotic purposes of the new president, who did not coincide with their nationalist and liberal orientation. Cabral was the first to break with Báez and went to Curacao, where he launched a manifesto of grievances in April 1866. He then moved to Haiti and raided the southern border, obtaining the support of some of the generals who had supported him during the last war. Faced with this situation, Rodríguez Objío, who in Puerto Plata had surrounded himself with people he trusted, declared himself in rebellion against the president and had Luperón, who at that time was in exile in the Turks and Caicos Islands, brought in to receive Luperón, on 28 April 1866, he gave a speech that became famous, in which he exacerbated his repudiation of Báez:

When, due to an inexplicable misfortune, the national party had to bow under the stained silver of the Spaniards, I deplored that event in the depths of my soul: but at the same time that my heart urged me to nobly reject the government of a traitor, my head He ordered me to follow a different behavior […]. I had always been designated as Marshal Báez's enemy. Ostracism and prison threatened me closely […]. Wanting to avoid persecution and be useful to my companions of glories and setbacks, I lied fidelity to the new master: that man, eternal enemy of my country and my friends, had the weakness of believing me, entrusting me with an important mission in Cibao, and later the civil and military governments of this Plaza that should be the path to your triumph […]. Events have crowned my wishes, because at the first cry of mine I have been able to secure this important District for you, and open the doors of the Homeland to you. I have suffered a lot morally, citizen General, having been condemned to make a new sacrifice in favor of the great national party: that of my tortured conscience. In the future, Citizen General, I am willing to renew the sacrifice of my blood as a soldier. On the 25th of this month I was able to definitively throw off my disguise, leading the statement in this Plaza: in this event the national spirit has guided me. TRAITORS MUST BE HURT BY BETRAYAL.

At the time, it seems that the author considered this speech an accomplished piece, but in Relations he exposes self-critical judgments, recognizing that, having allowed himself to be carried away by exaltation, he incurred exaggerations: in reality, he reflects, there was at no time "lied fidelity" to Báez, so he should have limited himself to saying that he feigned compliance. He also considered it absurd to have proclaimed himself a traitor, since one only betrays oneself if one fights one's principles or one's country. This speech, in any case, portrays the emotional characteristic of his person that led him to commit improvised acts that he later regretted.

Rodríguez Objío accompanied Luperón in the raid against the resistance of the leaders who supported Báez in the Cibaeño regions. During the campaign it became evident that most of the leaders of the Restoration had adhered to the figure of the deposed leader. Recalling this turn, and alluding to generals Benito Monción and Juan de Jesús Salcedo, he displayed his capacity for analysis by questioning the explanation given by some of the liberal intellectuals that the rebels were motivated by their lack of convictions and their rebellious characte; Without denying that they suffered from these flaws, he also wondered to what extent the conservative orientation of a part of the government top, personified in Cabral, did not contribute to the loss of popular influence of the liberals and the consequent defection of leaders to the conservative side.

In that period the close friendship between Rodríguez Objío and Gregorio Luperón must have been forged. The poet's nationalist mystique, which had exalted Sánchez's heroism, was projected under the new circumstances in Luperón. Still in the Puerto Plata speech the leader taken as a reference was Cabral, but shortly after relations between the poet and the warrior from Santomé and La Canela became cloudy.

When the rebellion of the liberals against Báez triumphed, after an interim government of a triumvirate composed of Gregorio Luperón, Pedro A. Pimentel and Federico de Jesús García, Cabral was reinstated in the presidency of the Republic for being the main leader of the liberals, who were already known as "the Blues". Rodríguez Objío understood that it made no sense to occupy positions in Cabral's second administration, when the influence of Fiallo, "the favorite" as he was called, was ratified, who proposed to nullify the influence of the men of the Restoration and favor the ancients. Santanistas. Hence, more clearly than in the first Cabral government, in the second, between 1866 and 1867, the majority of the ministers were former Santana officials.

Due to this government orientation, Rodríguez Objío settled in La Vega with his family and ignored political affairs. He followed in the footsteps of Luperón, "whose principles were highly harmonized with mine," who had dedicated himself to commercial activities in Puerto Plata. Previously, according to many young people and some prominent people in Cibao, Rodríguez Objío tried to convince Luperón to accept the presidency, which he flatly refused. Rodríguez Objío's intransigence led President Cabral to withdraw his confidence, so he was pleased that he settled in La Vega "among his own people," an expression that made it clear that he did not want his participation in public affairs. However, obeying the sense of duty, Rodríguez Objío was forced to participate in the repression of the uprising of Benito Monción and Juan de Jesús Salcedo, which did not prevent Pablo Pujol, one of Cabral's main supporters in Santiago, from accusing him of bad behavior and tried to put him before a court martial. The intrigues within the restaurateurs were beginning to take their toll on the spirit of Rodríguez Objío, who turned out to be one of the most opposed due to his radical stance. He himself characterized this situation shortly after:

The men of August 16, without support anywhere, without strength of any kind, ended up dividing among themselves, each joining the party that could offer them the greatest guarantees. Those among these who could not attempt a transaction with Báez were left isolated, enduring, like the tree in the desert, the impulse of all the winds. The traitors, annexationists and supporters of Báez competed in the political arena. These had to triumph sooner or later, since those worked in their favor.

Although removed from government functions, Rodríguez Objío renewed his patriotic commitment through doctrinal journalism. He proceeded to found La Voz del Cibao, which he conceived as the last trench of democratic radicalism. The critical tone of that newspaper exacerbated the ill will against him by government officials, despite the fact that figures such as José Gabriel García and Gregorio Luperón collaborated on its pages. He began to give shape to topics that characterized his democratic ideology: intransigence in the defense of national sovereignty, the search for a democratic order where legality prevailed, the vindication of the interests of the poor and proletarians, the fight for social equality. and legal, the eradication of racial discrimination and inequalities on ethnic or racial grounds.

At one point Rodríguez Objío moved to Santo Domingo, where he was elected deputy for La Vega, a position he refused to occupy due to disagreements with the government. Even so, on the occasion of the arrest of Pedro Guillermo, after an insurrectional attempt, Cabral asked Rodríguez Objío to preside over the military council that would judge him, claiming that no one felt brave enough to assume such responsibility. Rodríguez Objío agreed to the President's request and went to El Seibo, where he issued the death sentence on the Baecista leader, commonly considered a bandit. Immediately the exiled Baecistas described Rodríguez Objío as a murderer. Such animosity was exacerbated by the last offensive of the Cibaeño leaders against Cabral, which began in Monte Cristi in October 1867. One of them, Jove Barriento, was captured and executed by the liberal leader Subí, a fact that was unjustifiably attributed to Rodríguez Objío, who arrived at the scene when the shooting had already taken place. Rodríguez Objío's relations with the Cabral government became more tense when he was forced to remain in Santo Domingo, as the Baecistas advanced at the end of 1867. Then, in order to survive at all costs, Cabral sent Pablo Pujol on a mission to Washington, with the proposal to lease the Samaná peninsula to the United States in exchange for money and weapons. In "tumultuous" sessions, several deputies raised their protests, among whom were Rodríguez Objío and Juan Bautista Zafra.

=== Exile to Haiti ===
The fall of Cabral's administration was inevitable, since the vast majority of the caudillos, the influential figures in their respective communities, advocated the return of Báez. The announcement of the negotiations on Samaná ended up plunging the government into moral ruin, which was taken advantage of by Báez's supporters to, hypocritically, accuse him of being anti-national. Upon learning of the dealings with Samaná, Luperón broke up with Cabral and went to the Turks and Caicos Islands. At the end of January 1868, the blues capitulated in Santo Domingo and their leaders left the country. In one of his last notes before taking the path of exile alongside the figures of the fallen regime, and in the besieged city, Rodríguez Objío reflected on the causes of failure. He warned that the Spaniards of Cibao ended up united around Báez. Secondly, he considered that Cabral had isolated himself by surrounding himself with a very small ring of trusted people.

The expelled blues held a conference on the Venezuelan Guiaiguaza islet, in front of Puerto Cabello, where they were quarantined, because before leaving the Dominican Republic a cholera epidemic had broken out. In these conversations, the command aspirations of the blue military leaders Cabral, Luperón and Pimentel were revealed, each of whom had a cohort of supporters. Some conservatives who accompanied them also disputed hegemony, pointing particularly to the former Santanistas Tomás Bobadilla and Manuel Valverde. The relationship between these conservatives and the liberals was due to the fact that, due to old grudges, they did not accept the preponderance of Báez. But Rodríguez Objío, in his writings, was emphatic in denying that they belonged to the National Party, although he positioned it as a project that did not come together due to the rivalries of the leaders. A considerable part of those expelled settled in Haiti, taking advantage of the fact that President Sylvain Salnave had not yet reached a solid alliance with Báez, who had recently come to power. Rodríguez Objío went on to reside in Cap-Haïtien, where he obtained the protection of the local authorities. His personal situation was extremely difficult and he lived literally in misery, even though he dabbled in commercial activities.

The differences among the blues touched him, and he found antagonists who came to accuse him of treason. Pujol suggested that he had tried to get Salnave to capture Cabral in Jacmel, before he entered Dominican territory to start the guerrilla war against Báez. From what is inferred from his notes, he even came to doubt some of Luperón's attitudes, which he interpreted as the fruit of his aspiration for supreme leadership. He was filled with bitterness due to disappointment, since he could not understand the malevolence of many of his companions. This situation led him to abjure politics, and in several letters he asked that, if he ventured into it again, he be abhorred. He remained confined to private life for two years, while Cabral and other generals waged a prolonged war against Báez in the southwest. In any case, he occasionally collaborated with Pimentel, who was making efforts to consolidate a base of operations near the northern border, and attempted to harmonize relations between Pimentel and Luperón.

For personal reasons, Rodríguez Objío came to visit Las Matas de Farfán, held by the blues, where he met his brother Mariano (known as the warrior). He refused on that occasion and on others to accept the invitation to join the patriotic guerrilla. Perhaps he obeyed one of the maxims of his stamp: "It is preferable not to act, than to act halfway." Despite his state of mind, from a certain moment he devoted himself zealously to historical elaboration. He proposed to organize the Relations that he had begun many years before, creating new stories and refining his conception of Dominican history. Although the book did not go beyond the level of notes, not always integrated, of personal memories and political narration, it also introduced a systematic reflection that was unprecedented in the country. In this sense, he inaugurated the liberal consideration of national history, whose pragmatic goal was the independence and happiness of the people.

In his opinion, these principles continued to be represented by Luperón, which is why in 1870 he informed him of his intention to write his biography, focused on the Dominican Restoration War to the extent that he visualized it as the event that finished forging the Dominican nation. Luperón provided him with the documents he kept, with which he was able to write his long two-volume book Gregorio Luperón and history of the Restoration period. Although this text is limited to a political chronicle, it also represented pioneering work in the country, because thanks to the inclusion of documents and by expressing his vivid knowledge of the subject, for the first time an account of what happened in the war was articulated. José Gabriel García in those days began to have a similar concern. But it was not a laconic narrative, since the poet continually appeared, achieving a work of art exalting the hero and the sacrifices of the people. As he explained in a letter to Luperón on 20 April 1870, what he proposed was to rescue the unknown past of the Dominican people: "Our people lack history, and their renown sinks day after day into the deep darkness of oblivion or mystery; America itself knows him more for his disasters than for his glories; and yet these are incomparable."

=== Return to Dominican Republic, outbreak of war, and death ===
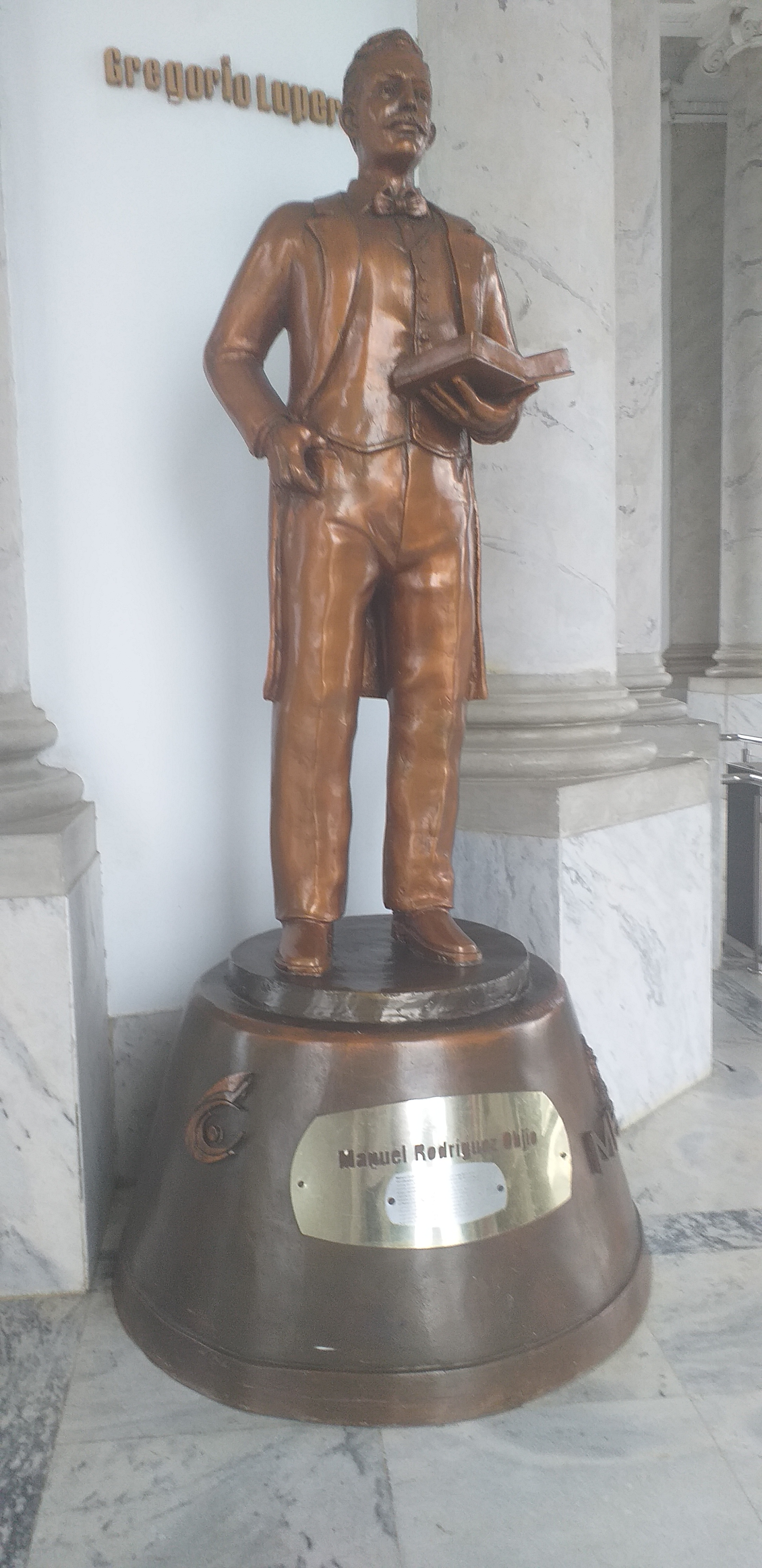
Statue of Manuel Rodríguez Objío

Despite being torn by disappointment and separated from political activity, in February 1871, Rodríguez Objío responded to Luperón's request that he accompany him on an expedition to the Northwest Line in order to anticipate the plan to annex the country to the United States. He joined in November 1869, a protocol had been signed for this purpose, and a few months later a referendum was held under severe conditions of repression, so almost all voters favored annexation. The liberals sensed an immense danger for the nation, which stimulated the rise of guerrillas in the south. But, despite awareness of the danger, the blue leaders could not agree. As there was no way to reach an operational agreement with Cabral, Luperón decided to open a front in the western portion of Cibao, in order to reach the surroundings of Santiago, where many of his supporters lived. To undertake his expedition, Luperón obtained support from General Nord Alexis, head of the Cape region and future president. Unlike Cabral in the south, who applied a guerrilla tactic, Luperón proposed to overthrow the government in the short term as the only means to prevent annexation to the United States. Some Baecista generals were already beginning to feel discontent with their supreme leader, and it is possible that they held secret negotiations with Luperón's envoys. At least, General José Hungary, former Minister of War, had broken with Báez and had assured Luperón that he could count on about 10 generals from the area. The fact is that the expedition members were confident that they would obtain the support of some red leaders of the Northwest Line as soon as they set foot on Dominican territory. The expedition was conceived as the spark necessary to generate an irresistible movement that would lead to the fall of the government.

Accompanied by 45 followers, among whom were Generals Segundo Imbert, Severo Gómez and Rodríguez Objío, Luperón crossed the border near Dajabón in March 1871. The first days the expedition members managed to advance, crushing the opposition presented to them by local troops, but none of the government leaders turned their weapons, which condemned them to failure. In El Pino, near Sabaneta, the expedition members were surrounded by a troop of 1,000 men, commanded by the head of the common, General Juan Gómez, who had received reinforcements from the head of the Line, General Federico de Jesús García. After a fierce fight of more than seven hours, Luperón's push gave way and he began to experience numerous casualties, such as that of General Severo Gómez, second in command.

When he ordered the withdrawal, it was too late for the group that included Rodríguez Objío, who was captured on 17 March, after trying to stay hidden in the La Peñita area. Brought before the presence of General Juan Gómez, he decided not to shoot the poet and tried to protect him. Apparently Gómez conceived of allowing Rodríguez Objío to escape, but without much conviction out of a sense of military duty. He placed it in the hands of General Federico de Jesús García, who also evaded taking responsibility for carrying out the execution, even though he had to do so by virtue of the decree of 18 June 1868, which stipulated the death penalty for those who were captured. in a state of rebellion. García and Gómez took the prisoner to Santiago to hand him over to the government delegate, Manuel Altagracia Cáceres. Given the outcry that arose in Santiago in favor of Rodríguez Objío's life, Cáceres decided to cancel the execution and referred it to the government.

In Santo Domingo, Rodríguez Objío was put on trial; It was foreseeable that the death penalty would be applied. It became evident that the president's clique harbored a violent animosity against the patriot, whom they blamed for the executions of Pedro Guillermo and Jove Barriento. All government agencies, obeying Báez's dictate, ratified the death penalty sentence. As in Santiago, a demand arose among various sectors of the city, such as corporations, Masonic lodges, ladies and resident foreigners. For days the president and his ministers refused to receive people who asked for clemency. Báez's argument was that the prisoner was a criminal murderer. He was forced to listen to the request of a group of ladies. One of them, a Cuban, fell to her knees before the president, who made her stand up wanting to be gallant. However, he could not avoid falling into vulgarity when he expressed to her: "Madam, you who are so beautiful, if I forgive you, you will go to the border to put your "Beauty of the targets of the cacoses' shots?" The President was referring to the name that his supporters gave to the blues, in order to identify them as criminals and agents of Haiti.

In the days he spent in prison, Rodríguez Objío left some writings. Without foundation, some writers have accused him of having regretted his actions. In fact, in My Last Wills, a text dated in Guayubín on 19 March 1871, he ratifies his conceptions, although he describes his willingness to fight for them as an error, since the people did not share them:

Now I must say something in defense of my errors. They have had as their origin the persuasion in which I have always lived that the autonomous existence of the Dominican Republic was possible; that the ignorance, bad faith or false assessments of the governments that have succeeded one another since the year 44 have been the only obstacles that have opposed the justification of my belief, which is why I have fought some of them, perhaps too much. heat or acrimony. However, I was ostracized, resigned to accept every fact, given that the majority of my compatriots have an opinion contrary to mine, when it was announced to me and I was persuaded through different channels and means that the same opinion of The country had radically changed, and it called upon those expelled to move toward peace and fraternization. Under the influence of this uncalculated persuasion in my spirit I did not know how to maintain the indifference that had been imposed on me by system: I was weak before the always blind impulse of enthusiasm and I have fallen into the last mistake of my life.

Before his execution, just as his with his idol, Francisco del Rosario Sánchez, he recommended that his children be kept away from "intellectual speculation" and that they be given a practical education, which was equivalent to removing them from politics to make them happier. That disenchantment did not prevent him from maintaining the firmness of character to face his destiny. The last days of his life were spent in a perfect state of tranquility. On 18 April 1871, designated for the execution, he was awakened very early and taken by a small picket to one side of the cemetery, within sight of the Puerta del Conde, in the current southwestern corner of Parque Independencia. He fell like the brave man he was, without showing signs of weakness. Like a sailor singing in the storm, as he described himself, he had just finished a poem against the tyrant and calmly faced the fatal shipwreck. He was shot dead at age 33.

== Personal life ==
On 8 January 1861 Objío married María del Rosario Ravelo Prados, a white Dominican of Canarian descent; they had two daughters and one son.

He had another daughter with a woman named Rita Reyes.

Rodríguez Objío was fluent in French.

=== Descendants ===
Among his descendants can be highlighted:

- Alejandro Grullón Espaillat (banker), great-grandson of Manuel Rodríguez Objío
  - Manuel Grullón Viñas (banker), son of the latter
    - Manuel Grullón Hernández (banker), son of the latter
- Ivonne Haza (soprano), great-granddaughter of Manuel Rodríguez Objío
  - Marcos Bisonó (businessman), son of Ivonne
  - Víctor Bisonó (politician), son of Ivonne
- Oscar Haza (journalist), nephew of Ivonne Haza, great-great-grandson of Manuel Rodríguez Objío
- Rita Indiana (singer, author and LGBT and feminist activist), grand-niece of Ivonne Haza, great-great-great-granddaughter of Manuel Rodríguez Objío
- Baseball player Alex Rodriguez is great-grandson of Mariano Rodríguez Objío.

== See also ==
- Gregorio Luperón
- Francisco del Rosario Sánchez
- Buenaventura Báez
- Six Years' War

== Bibliography ==
- Lugo Lovatón Ramón. Manuel Rodríguez Objío. (Poeta-restauradorhistoriador-mártir). Ciudad Trujillo, 1951.
- Martínez, Rufino. Diccionario biográfico-histórico dominicano (1821–1930). 2da. ed. Santo Domingo, 1997.
- Pérez, José Joaquín. Manuel R. Objío. Brisas del Ozama. Consideraciones y apuntes biográficos, El Nacional, 10 de abril14 de agosto de 1875.
- Rodríguez Demorizi, Emilio (ed.). Actos y doctrina del gobierno de la Restauración. Santo Domingo, 1963.
- Rodríguez Objío, Manuel. Relaciones. Ciudad Trujillo, 1951.
- Rodríguez Objío, Manuel. Gregorio Luperón y historia de la Restauración. 2 vols. Santiago, 1939.
- Rodríguez Objío, Manuel. Poesías. Santo Domingo, 1888.
