= Marcos Bisonó =

Dominican Republic businessman

Marcos Rodolfo Bisonó Haza is a Dominican businessman and lawyer. Bisonó is currently the President of Asociación Dominicana de la Industria del Cigarrillo (ASOCIGAR).

== Early life ==
Marcos Bisonó was born in Santo Domingo, and is the son of architect Victor Bisonó Pichardo, born into a prominent family (Note: The Bisonó family descends from Jean Bissonnet (d. 1817), his wife Marie Framingdano, and their child, Pierre Bissonnet (born in France in 1775). Pierre married twice, first to Marie-Joséphine Sanout and later to Marie Thami. The Bissonnet were landowners in Gonaïves, Saint-Domingue (currently Haiti) and had to flee amid a massacre against whites to San José de las Matas, in the then-French-administered Santo Domingo (currently the Dominican Republic). Pierre had 1 children with the former: María Josefa (born in Gonaïves, died 1896 in San José de las Matas); with the latter he had 4 children: Pedro Luys (1805-1853), Ana (1806-1886), Miguel (?), Pedro Antonio (1807-1882), all born in San José de las Matas; his father died in 1817, in San José de las Matas. Some children of Miguel and Pedro Luys Bisonó moved from San José de las Matas and established in what today is known as “Villa Bisonó”, and became wealthy farmers and traders, and eventually a prominent family.) from Villa Bisonó in the foothills of the Northern Mountain-Range in Santiago Province, and Ivonne Haza, a renowned national soprano from San Pedro de Macorís. He completed elemental school at Colegio Santa Teresita and graduated cum laude as Juris Doctor from the Universidad Iberoamericana’s Law School. He also completed some courses at the Lawyers Yale School of Management.

Bisonó is descended from Domingo Daniel Pichardo, Vice President of the Dominican Republic from 1857 to 1858, and Fernando Valerio, who is considered a hero of the Battle of Santiago (1844).

=== Ancestors ===
Ancestors of Marcos Bisonó

16. Joseph Estanislao 'Juan' Bisonó Muñoz (b. 1840, m. 1871, d. 1900)
8. Juan Caridad Bisonó Checo (b. 1872, d. 1969)
17. María Caridad Checo Rodríguez (m. 1871)
4. Gustavo Nery Bisonó Fernández (b. 1899, d. 1949)
Juan Fernández
9. Agapita Fernández Castro
2. Víctor Gustavo Bisonó Pichardo (b. 1933, m. 1961)
20. Rodolfo Ramón Pichardo Román (b. 1847, m. 1870, d. 1927; son of Domingo Daniel Pichardo)
10. Florencio Rodolfo Pichardo Valerio (b. 1881, m. 1907, d. 1959)
21. Juana Francisca Valerio Suriel (b. 1853, m. 1870, d. 1944; daughter of Fernando Valerio)
5. Rosa Pichardo Corona (b. 1908, m. 1931, d. 1983)
22. Ramón Corona
11. Rosa Corona Collado (b. 1877, m. 1907, d. 1964)
23. María Collado
1. Marcos Rodolfo Bisonó Haza (b. 1965)
6. Luis Felipe Haza González
3. Sara María Ivonne Haza del Castillo (b. 1938, m. 1961, d. 2022)
28. Benigno (Ruiz) del Castillo
14. Luis Temístocles del Castillo García (1854–1922)
29. Gabina García Perdomo
7. Rita Indiana del Castillo y Rodríguez-Objío
30. Manuel Rodríguez Objío
15. Dolores Eloísa Rodríguez-Objío Reyes (1867–1941)
31. Rita Altagracia Reyes García
