= Hony Estrella =

Dominican actress and presenter

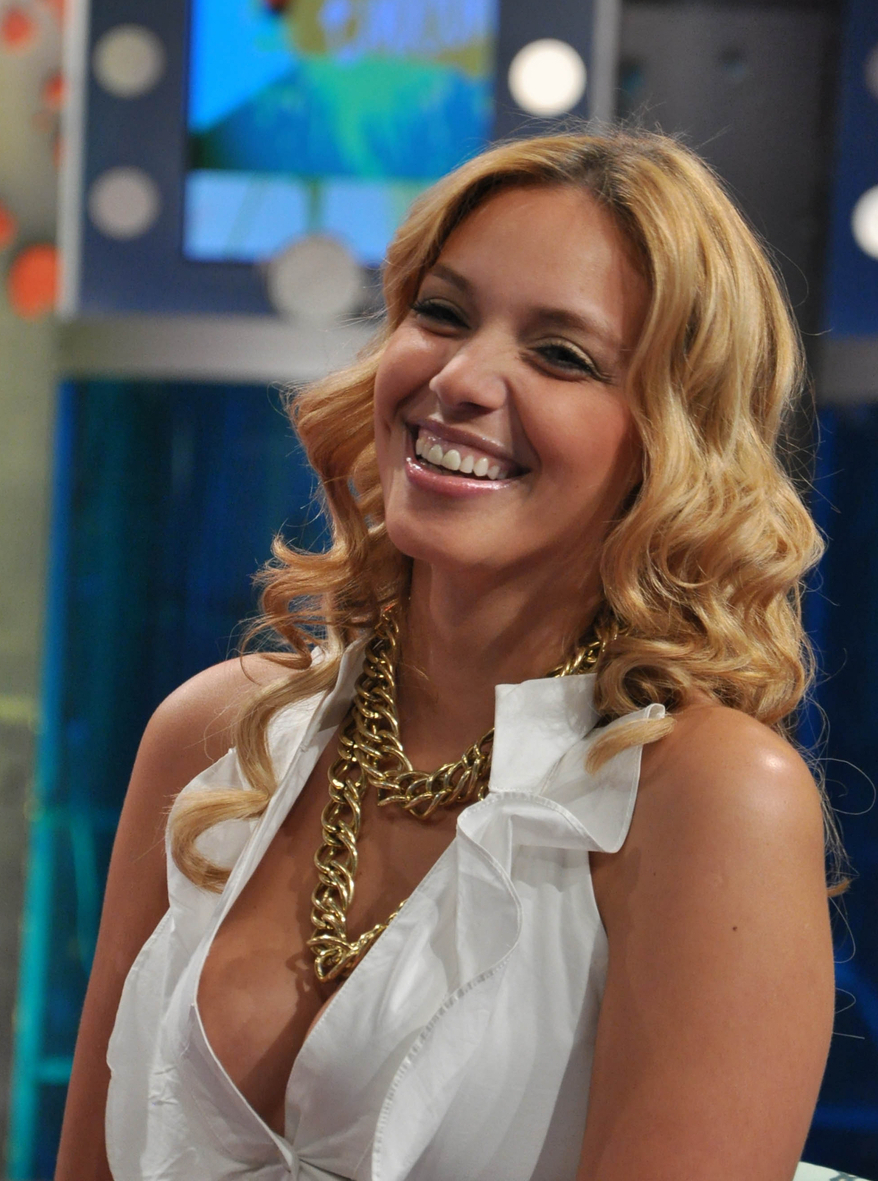
- Hony Estrella in 2011.
- Born: January 1, 1984 (age 42); Santo Domingo, Dominican Republic
- Occupations: Actress, Presenter
- Years active: 1999 - present
- Television: El Mismo Golpe con Jochy; Divertido con Jochy

Hony Smailyn Gregoria Hilario Estrella (born January 1, 1984, in Santo Domingo, Dominican Republic) is a Dominican actress and presenter.

== Early career ==
During her adolescence, Hony began her career as an announcer on several Dominican FM stations such as Rumba FM, Cadena Espacial, Neón and Viva FM (now Fidelity). She entered television as voiceover of El Despeine, a youth TV program broadcast by Mango TV. There, in 2002 as co-anchor Ventures in Video Hits, a program of music videos.

Her public profile was revitalized when joined with Jochy Santos, one of the most widely known of the Dominican Republic. This includes being co-presenter on El Mismo Golpe con Jochy and Divertido con Jochy, respectively. Thereafter, Hony has been on several television and radio programs such as: Adolescentes en cadena, Contacto joven, Misión Iguazú, Perdone La Hora, Solo para mujeres, Radio Como Yo, Consultando con Ana Simó, Rumbo a los premios Casandra, among others.

In 2007, Hony was selected to lead the first two seasons of the reality show ¿Quién baila mejor?.

Hony credits as an actress include Evita, 85 Chevy, The song of the cicada, ¿Con Quien se Casará Mi Novia? (English: who will marry With My Girlfriend?), Mi amor o mi libertad, Condesa por Amor, Prohibido Seducir a los Casados, Cada Oveja con su Pareja, la versión dominicana de Mujeres asesinas, among others.

== Filmography ==
Theater	TV	Cinema
Evita	Chevy 85	Arrobá
El canto de la cigarra	Condesa por Amor	Mi angelito favorito
Cada Oveja con su Pareja	Mujeres asesinas	All Men Are the Same
¿Con Quién se Casará mi Novia?		Papi
Mi amor o mi libertad		The Silence of Marcos Tremmer
Prohíbido Seducir a los Casados		
Gorditas		
la Leyenda del Comodín		
Adulterios		
Steel Magnolias		
