= Papi (2020 film) =

- Theatrical release poster
- Directed by: Noelia Quintero
- Screenplay by: Noelia Quintero
- Based on: Papi by Rita Indiana
- Produced by: Rafael Elías Muñoz
- Starring: Avril Alcántara; Hony Estrella; Amauris Pérez; Olga Bucarelli
- Cinematography: Pedro Juan López
- Edited by: Nino Martínez Sosa
- Music by: Rita Indiana; Luis Amed Irizarry
- Production company: Lantica Media
- Distributed by: Caribbean Films Distribution
- Release dates: November 25, 2020 (Santo Domingo); November 26, 2020 (Dominican Republic)
- Running time: 88 minutes
- Country: Dominican Republic
- Language: Spanish

Papi (lit. 'Daddy') is a 2020 Dominican surrealist drama film written and directed by Noelia Quintero in her directorial debut. Based on the novel of the same name by Rita Indiana, the film stars Avril Alcántara, Hony Estrella, Amauris Pérez and Olga Bucarelli. It follows the memories and imagination of an eight-year-old girl as she deals with the abandonment of her drug-dealing father.

== Cast ==
- Avril Alcántara as Sonia
- Hony Estrella as Rosalia
- Amauris Pérez as Papi
- Olga Bucarelli as Cili
- Orlando Almonte as José Hamilton
- Jean Luis Burgos as Puchy
- Ángela Sofía Caro as La Turca
- Yubo Fernandez as Zoila
- Rita Indiana as Muerta
- Canario Joseph as Papa Clari
- Soraya Pina as China
- Vanessa Torres as Milly
- Roger Wasserman as Armando
- Eddy Avila as Amigo de Papi

== Production ==
Principal photography took place between October and late December 2017 at Pinewood Dominican Republic Studios, located in San Pedro de Macorís, Dominican Republic.

== Release ==
Papi had its world premiere on November 25, 2020, at the Downtown Center in Santo Domingo, followed by a wide national theatrical release on November 26.

== Accolades ==
Award / Festival	Date of ceremony	Category	Recipient(s)	Result	Ref.
Soberano Awards	15 June 2021	Best Film - Drama	Papi	Won	
Soberano Awards	15 June 2021	Best Film Actress	Avril Alcántara	Nominated	
Soberano Awards	15 June 2021	Best Film Actress	Olga Bucarelli	Nominated	
Soberano Awards	15 June 2021	Best Film Actor	Amauris Pérez	Nominated	
La Silla Awards	28 August 2022	Best Picture	Papi	Nominated	
La Silla Awards	28 August 2022	Best Director	Noelia Quintero	Nominated	
La Silla Awards	28 August 2022	Best Actress in a Leading Role	Avril Alcántara	Won	
La Silla Awards	28 August 2022	Best Actor in a Leading Role	Amauris Pérez	Nominated	
La Silla Awards	28 August 2022	Best Editing	Nino Martínez	Won	
La Silla Awards	28 August 2022	Best Musicalization	Rita Indiana & Luis Irrizarri	Won	
La Silla Awards	28 August 2022	Best Art Direction	Oliver Rivas	Won	
La Silla Awards	28 August 2022	Best Costume Design	Alina Julia	Won	
