= Fernando Valerio =

National Hero of the Dominican Republic (1806–1862)

Fernando Valerio Gil
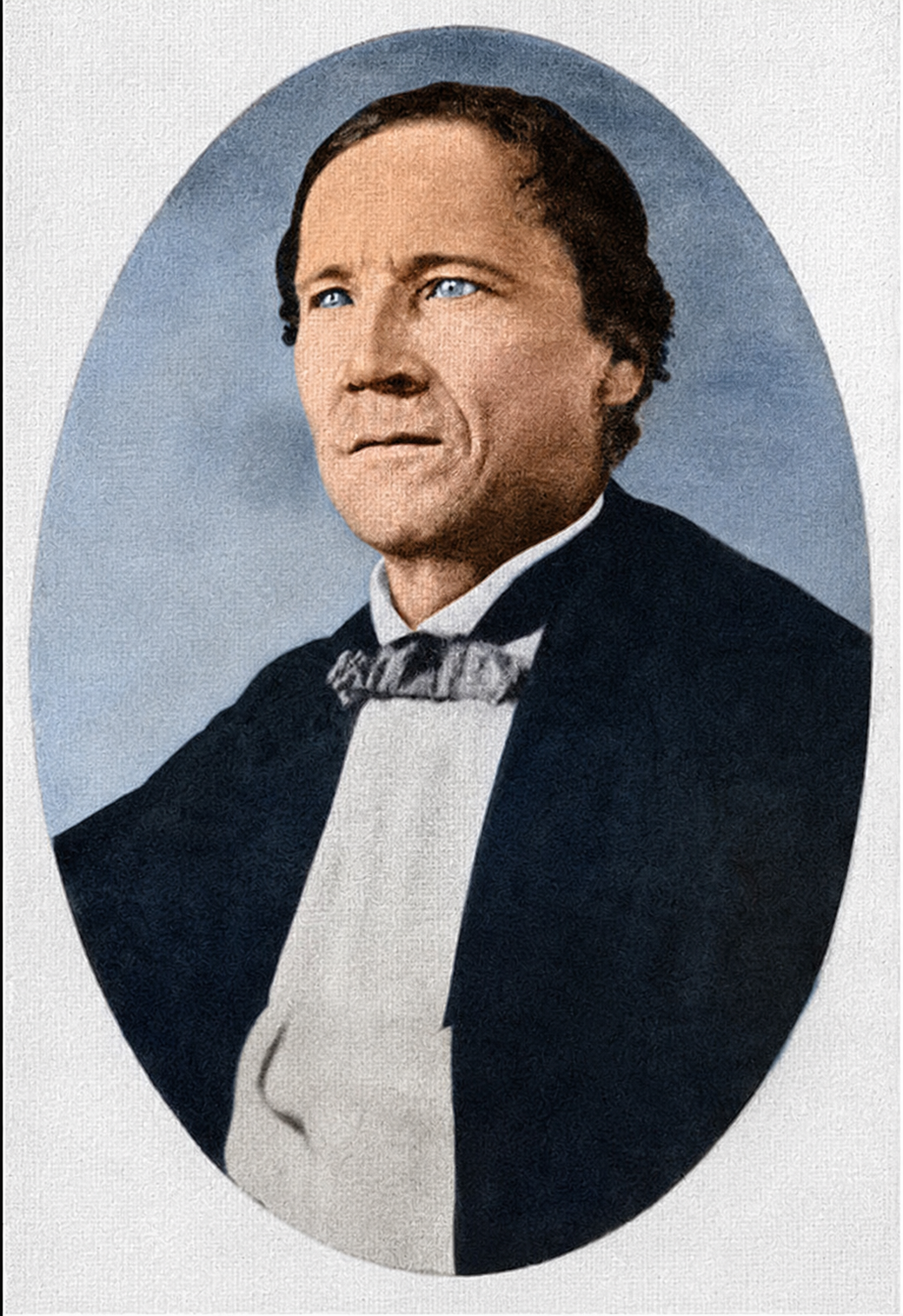
- Born: 1806 (approx. 1801–1807); Sabana Iglesia, Santiago, Dominican Republic
- Died: 2 November 1863 (aged 56–57); Guayubín, Dominican Republic
- Spouse: Petronila Suriel Fernández (m. 1827)
- Children: 7 children with Petronila Suriel; 2 children with María Ignacia Gómez; 4 children with Eduviges Peña
- Military career
- Allegiance: Dominican Republic; Spanish Empire (from 1861)
- Branch: Dominican Army
- Service years: 1844–1863
- Rank: Divisional General
- Conflicts: Dominican War of Independence; Battle of Santiago (1844); Battle of Sabana Larga

Fernando Valerio Gil (1806 – November 2, 1863) was an agriculturalist and soldier from the Dominican Republic. He is considered a hero of the battles of Santiago —together with José María Imbert—, and Sabana Larga —together with Juan Luis Franco Bidó—. He was commander in chief of the northern border.

General Fernando Valerio Gil was born in 1806 in Sabana Iglesia, in the parish of Santiago. Described as white and blue-eyed, Valerio was born in a family of Spanish ancestry. His parents were Narciso Valerio and Elena Gil Tineo. Valerio married his first cousin once removed Petronila Suriel Fernández (c. 1801–1908) in 1827, with whom he begot 7 children. He also had offspring with other two women, with María Ignacia Gómez had two children and with Eduviges Peña had four children.

During the Haitian regime that ruled Santo Domingo, Valerio belonged to the civic infantry in which he reached the rank of captain. After the Dominican Independence was declared in February 1844, the Haitian president Charles Rivière-Hérard advanced with his troops to reconquer the rebel territory, but Valerio, at the head of a contingent, confronted him. This event, that was known as the "Charge of the Andulleros", was decisive for the Dominican victory at the Battle of Santiago (March 1844). When the Dominican War of Independence ended in 1856, Valerio was promoted to the rank of Divisional General.

He died on 2 November 1863.

== Origins ==
Regarding the origin of General Fernando Valerio, there have been many speculations that whether he was from San José de las Matas, Sabana Iglesia or whether he was born in Santiago.

According to data obtained personally, in the historical archive of Santiago and by articles published by the young historian Edwin Rafael Espinal Hernández, he concludes that Fernando Valerio was born in Santiago around the year 1801, son of Narciso Valerio and Elena Gil. The confusion comes because the entire area between Sabana Iglesia, Jánico and San José de las Matas was known as the mountain area which for religious purposes was dominated by the latter municipality, that is, everything related to the civil registries of those baptized and permits to be able to marry had to be done in San José de las Matas, since the parish was based there.

In one article, Hernández claimed that those born in this entire mountain area were considered "Naturals" of Santiago. Therefore Fernando Valerio, despite having been born in Sabana Iglesia, was considered "Natural" of Santiago, since no settlements were made in Sabana Iglesia for those born and San José de las Matas at that time was not a parish.

Below is a translated excerpt from the article by the young historian to which it infers:

"In his petition in 1827 to Father Solano, Fernando Valerio declared that he was “a native and resident” of Santiago, a testimony that raises questions. In effect, the term “ "natural" would mean that he had been born in Santiago, thus contradicting some authors who place his coming into the world in Sabana Iglesia. However, until 1814, when the parish of San José de Las Matas was erected, the inhabitants of its jurisdiction, according to dispensations of the same period, they were called natives of Santiago. Valerio declared that he was twenty years old in 1827, so he was born around 1807, that is, before the creation of the mountain parish.

The word “neighbor” also raises questions. Valerio testified that by then he was a farmer, which may lead us to consider that his domicile was not properly the city of Santiago de los Caballeros. It has been speculated that perhaps he lived in a rural community. In connection with this, it is striking that the company that he commanded as captain of the Civic Guard on March 30, 1844 in Santiago, was made up of andulleros from Sabana Iglesia. His condition as a man dedicated to agricultural work and his ties with mountain families could well have been the key to said integration."

== Military career ==
Once Independence was proclaimed, he took up arms in the Dominican War of Independence, commanding a contingent of troops from Sabana Iglesia, went to the defense of Santiago threatened by the Haitian army that was advancing along the Northwest Line. He was named Chief of the border and participated in all the campaigns of the independence war until the last battle."

As a career soldier, he was assigned along with his troops to an outpost. He knew how to bravely defend his position, ordering in a moment of danger a machete charge against a Haitian advance party that was trying to cross the Yaque River. This load is known in history as The Load of the Andulleros, because the people of Sabana Iglesia were mostly dedicated to the preparation of andullos (tobacco). His merits earned him the promotion to Division General with the position of Chief of the Northwest Line based in Guayubín where he lived for the rest of his life."

== Later years and death ==
Like many other soldiers of Independence, he welcomed the reincorporation of the Republic into Spain in 1861."

He died in 1862 in Guayubín and his remains rest in the Iglesia Mayor de Santiago, where they were transferred in 1928."

== Ancestry ==
Ancestors of Fernando Valerio

2. Narciso Valerio
1. Fernando Valerio Gil; b. 1806, Sabana Iglesia d. 1863, Guayubín
6. Diego Gil
3. Elena Gil Tineo
28. Juan Tineo; b. about 1676
14. Juan Tineo Gil
29. Francisca Gil
7. Francisca Tineo Grullón
15. Simona Grullón

== See also ==
- Pedro Eugenio Pelletier
- Juan Erazo
- Battle of Santiago
