= Jánico =

Jánico Municipio de Janico
- Town and municipality
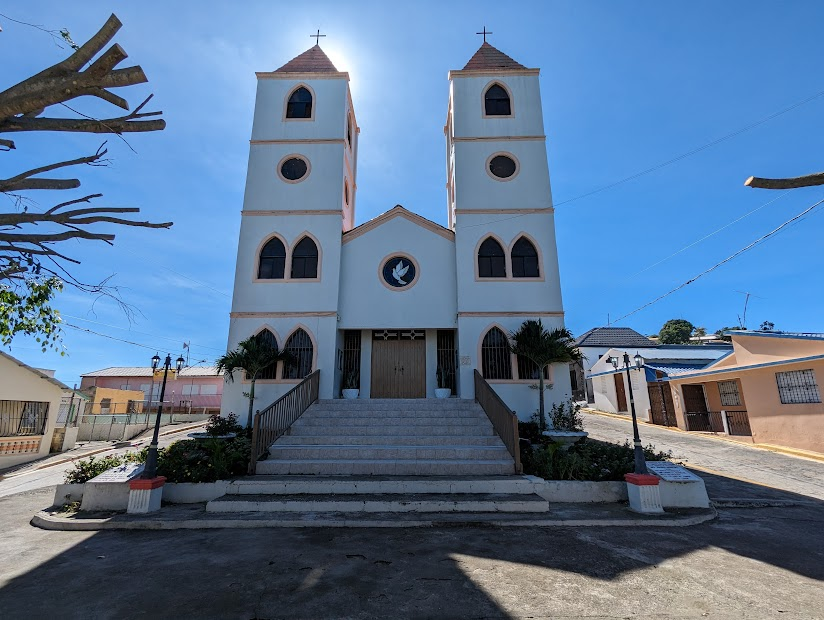
- Janico, Dominican Republic town church.

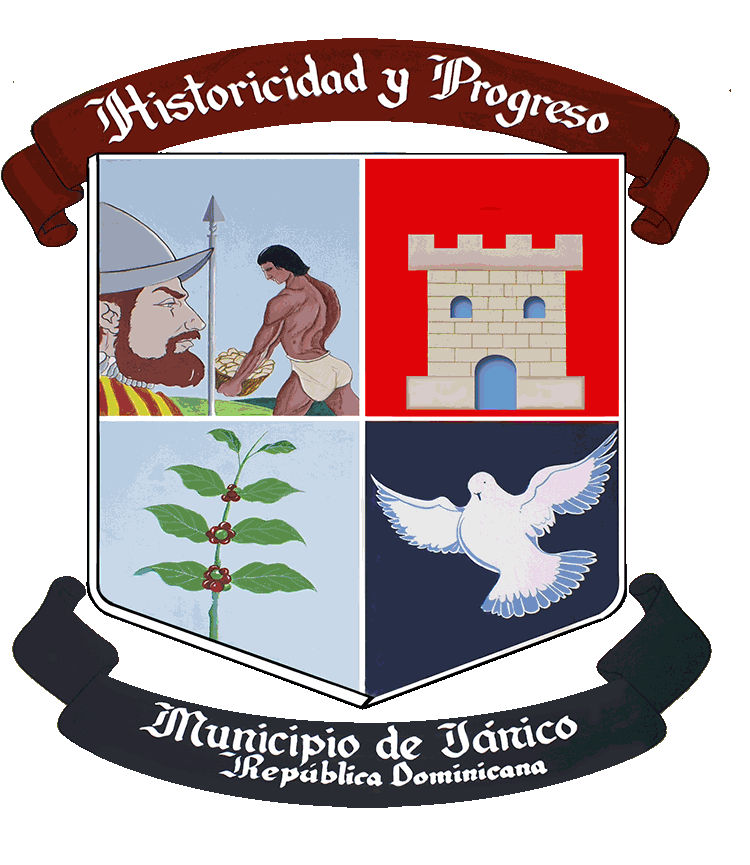
- Coat of arms

- Jánico in the Dominican Republic
- Coordinates: 19°19′34″N 70°48′54″W
- Country: Dominican Republic
- Province: Santiago
- Settled: 16 March 1494
- Incorporated: 29 March 1881

Government
  - Mayor: Hilario Fernández (Dominican Liberation’s Party)

Area
  - Total: 235.03 km^{2} (90.75 sq mi)
- Elevation: 370 m (1,210 ft)

Population (2010)
  - Total: 16,993
  - Density: 72.301/km^{2} (187.26/sq mi)
  - Urban: 1,730
  - Rural: 15,263
- Municipal Districts: 2

Jánico (Caribbean Spanish pronunciation: [ˈhaniko]) is a small mountain town and municipality (municipio) of the Santiago province in the Dominican Republic. A part of the Central Mountain Range, it sits east of San Jose de las Matas; west of Sabana Iglesia; and southwest of Santiago de los Caballeros. The municipality is spread over two municipal districts (distritos municipal): Juncalito and El Caimito Jánico acquired the status of municipality of the province of Santiago on March 29, 1881.

The town sits at a relatively high elevation, as part of the Central Mountain Range, (an average elevation of 370 meters), which gives the municipality a pleasant climate. Along with two municipal districts, Janico contains many rural districts (secciones): Cagüeyes, Cebu, Dicayagua Abajo, Jagua Abajo, Loma del Corral, Mesetas, Franco Bido, Janey, Rincon Largo, Yaque Abajo, Pinalito, Los Pilones, and La Guama.

== Etymology and nicknames ==
The name of the municipality Janico is derived from the Santo Tomas de Janico Fortess, built by Christopher Columbus in 1494.

== History ==
Jánico was first settled when Italian explorer and navigator Christopher Columbus established a stockade there in March 1494, with intention of protecting his gold mining ambitions. The prospectivity of gold was established earlier in the year by an expedition led by Alonso de Ojeda

In the same year of 1494, Columbus ordered the construction of the ephemeral Santo Tomás de Jánico Fortress, the first built inland on the island, and the second in all of America. The remains of this fortress still lie in Janico.

Due to its location in the Central Mountain Range, and its presence in the region known as the Sierra (Spanish: La Sierra; pronounced [la ˈsjera]) Janico received a sizeable amount of white refugees from both Saint-Domingue and the Cibao Valley, the former during the slave revolts in 1805. By then, the (then town) was peopled mostly by ethnic Canarians and French who established a markedly endogamous society in order to preserve their whiteness, very few owned slaves.

The (then town) of Janico acquired the status of municipality on the 29th of March 1881, after 387 years.

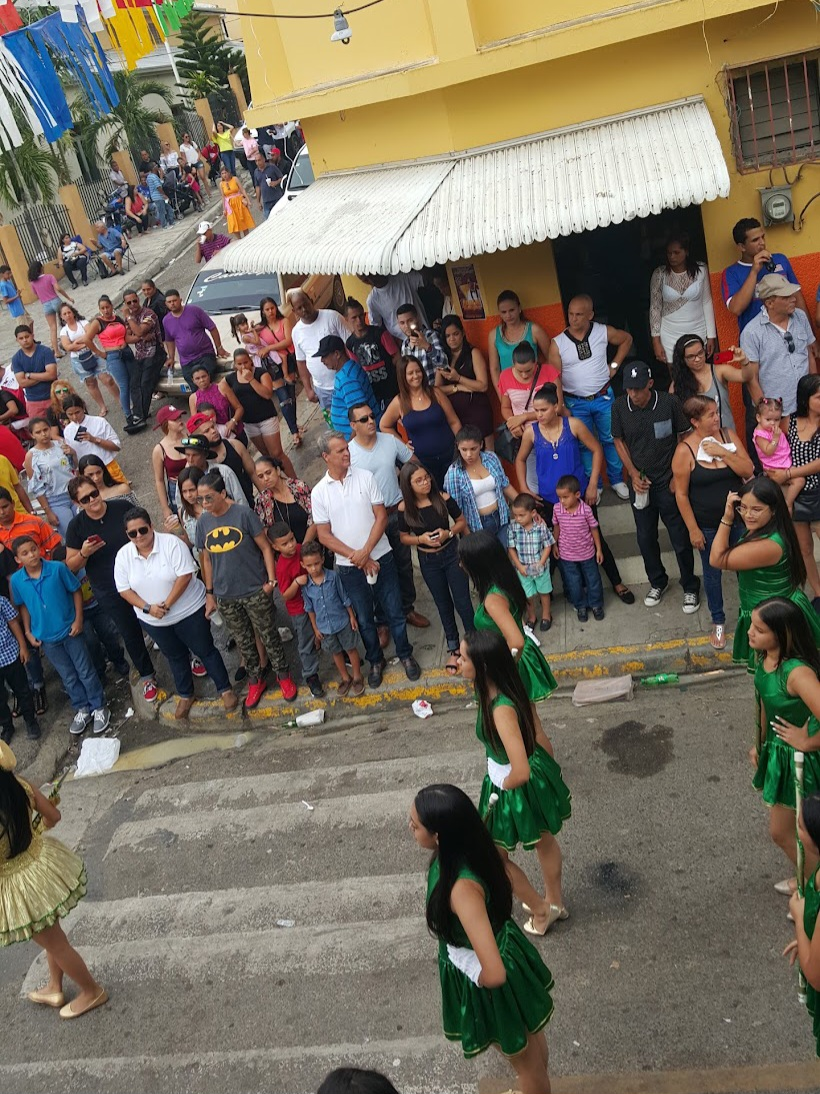
People of Janico, Dominican Republic.

== Geography ==
Jánico is part of a region known as the Sierra (Spanish: La Sierra; pronounced [la ˈsjera]), which is a part of the Central Mountain Range, in the Cibao region. The municipality is located east of San Jose de las Matas; west of Sabana Iglesia; and southwest of Santiago de los Caballeros.

== Demographics ==
In the 1950 census it was the town with the second highest percentage of white people in the country, with 81.1 percent.

According to a 2016 genealogical DNA testing by the Genographic Project, the town still had among the highest percentages of both European and pre-Columbian heritages in the island, at 76% and 10%, respectively, while the African input was numbered at only 14%.

The cause of these demographics lies in its history. The town was peopled in the 18th century mostly by ethnic Canarians and French, who established a markedly endogamous society in order to preserve their whiteness; only a very few were slaveholders.

== Economy ==
The main source of the municipality's economy is agriculture, with coffee cultivation as a reference, which makes it one of the most important coffee-growing areas in the country. Remittances also constitute an important element in the economy of this municipality.

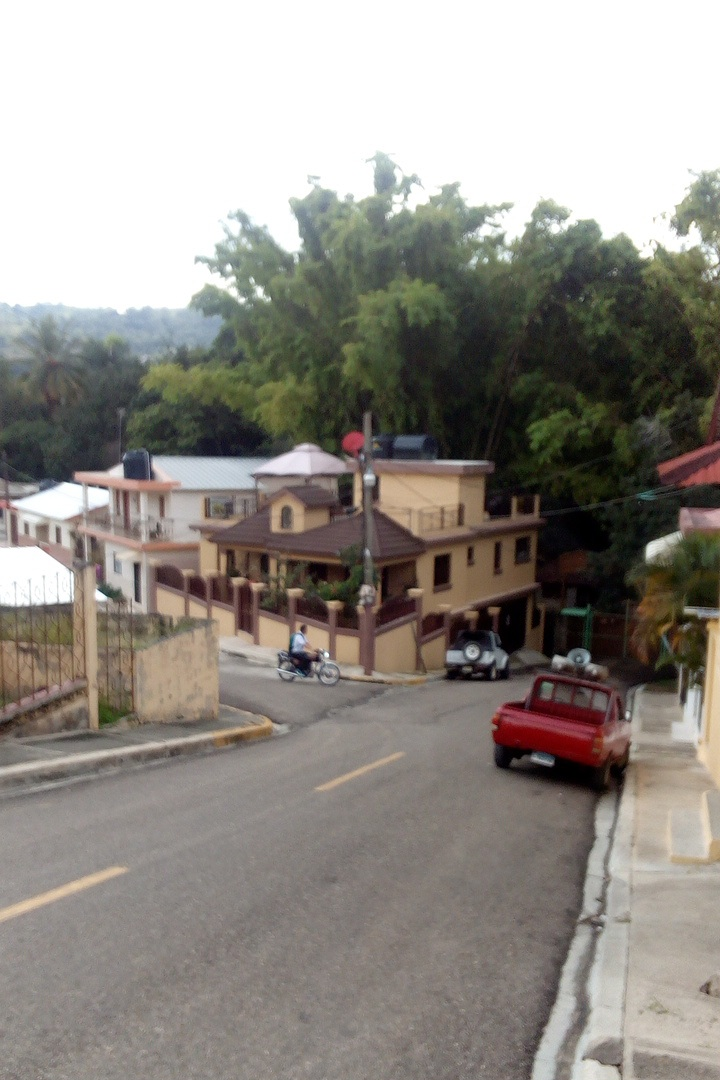

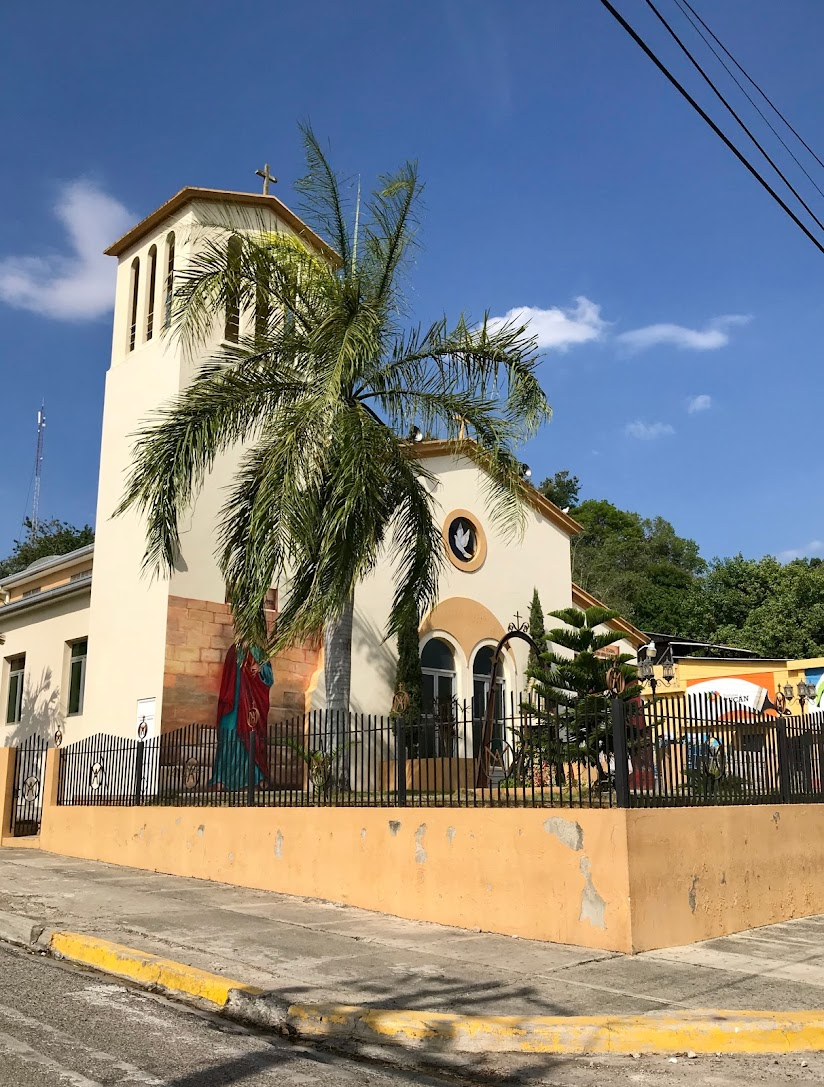

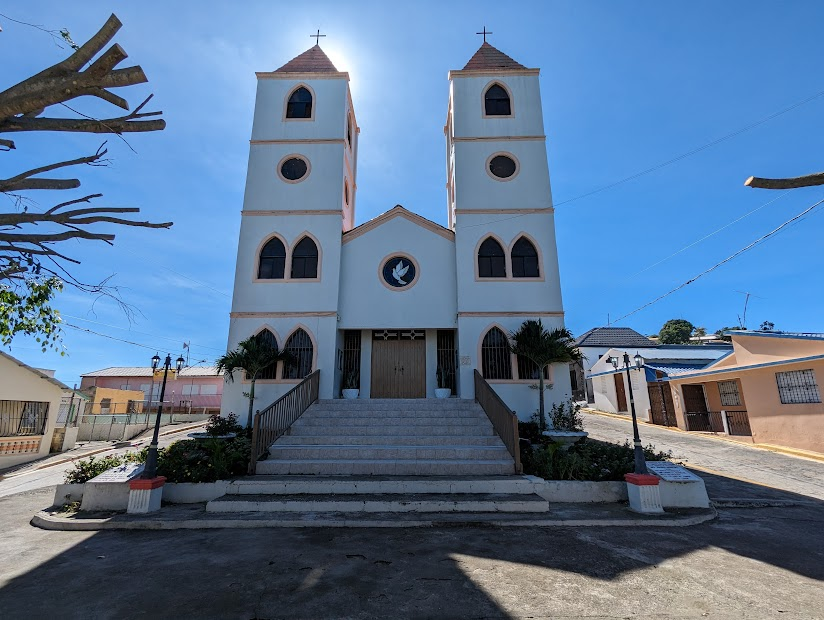

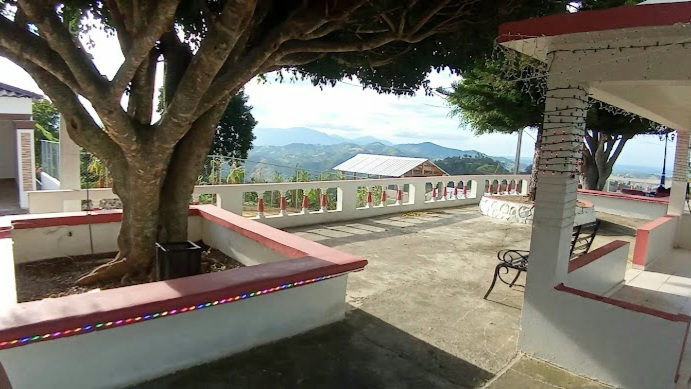

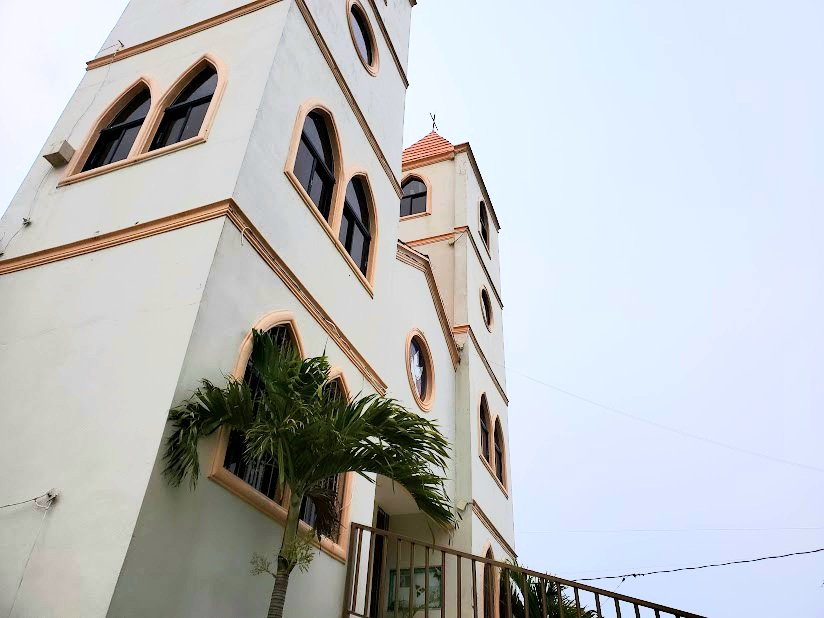

Its location in the Central Mountain Range gives it landscape attributes with great potential for mountain tourism. Among its attractions are the Bao reservoir and a botanical garden with an area of 700 hectares of land. On its border with the municipality of Sabana Iglesia is the Taveras hydroelectric complex, located on the Yaque del Norte and Bao rivers. It is formed by the Taveras, Bao dams and the López Angostura reservoir. This endowment contributes 185 GWH to the national electrical system and is used to irrigate approximately 9,100 hectares of land.

For comparison with other municipalities and municipal districts see the list of municipalities and municipal districts of the Dominican Republic.
