= Yubo Fernández =

Dominican actress

- Born: Yubogil Fernández; November 27, 1979 (age 46); Santo Domingo, Dominican Republic

Yubo Fernández (born 27 November 1979, in Santo Domingo, Dominican Republic) Dominican painter, actress and visual artist. Fernández received awards for her acting performance in Barcelona, Toronto, Los Angeles, and Arizona.

== Education ==
Fernández studied Marketing at APEC University in Santo Domingo. She lived for 10 years in New York City, studying acting at Atlantic Film School, NYC, accents at Edge Studio NYC and cinematography at Altos de Chavón School. She received coaching from John Strasberg of the Lee Strasberg Theater and Film Institute and coaching with Claude Kerven, board director of cinematography at NYFA.

== Acting ==
She participated in the Broadway work The Lost Widow. She played a role in El Encuentro, the work of director Alfonso Rodriguez. She starred in How we Kill Luisa in 2016 In 2017 Fernandez started a campaign of cancer awareness, releasing an international calendar with top Dominican models. She also work as a freelance model.

In July 2019 Fernandez presented her third play at Broadway New York City, a monologue called “Late for Martinis”. Written and directed by Cuban Playwright, Screenwriter and Director Alejandro Normand, adapted to English language by Yubo Fernandez. In 2020, she played as Zoila in the surrealist film Papi.

== As Visual Artist ==
As a painter, Fernández has developed a distinctive style that blends abstract and pop art influences, drawing inspiration from artists such as Wassily Kandinsky, Andy Warhol, and Jackson Pollock. Her work often explores themes of identity, culture, and social issues, expressed through bold colors and textured compositions. Her paintings have been exhibited in major galleries and art fairs worldwide, with one of her pieces recently auctioned in the United States, marking a significant milestone in her artistic career.

== Awards ==
- Barcelona Planet Film Festival: Best Actress
- One World Toronto Film Festival: Best Actress
- L.A Shorts Awards :Best Actress (Diamond Award)
- Platinum Award ( Platinum Award)
- Hollywood Blv Fest: Best Short Film, Best Actress
- Chandler Film Fest: Short Film, Best Actress
- Barcelona Planet Film Festival (Barcelona, España)
- Real Time Film Festival (Lagos, Nigeria)
- Film Noir Festival (Albert, Francia)
- Hollywood independent Film Festival (Los Angeles, EU) L.A. Shorts Awards (Los Angeles, EU)
- Hollywood Blvd Film Festival (Los Angeles, EU) Indi Wise Film Festival (FLorida, EU)
- Miami Independent Film Festival (Florida, EU) Chandler Itln Film Festival (Arizona, EU)
- LA independent Film Fest Awards (Los Angeles, EU)
