= Ivonne Haza =

Dominican soprano (1938–2022)

- Haza, c. 2008–11
- Born: 25 December 1938; Angelina, San Pedro de Macorís Province, Dominican Republic
- Died: 16 June 2022 (aged 83); Dominican Republic
- Occupations: Operatic soprano; Theatre manager; Voice teacher
- Awards: Order of the Dominicos of Duarte of Sánchez and Mella; Order of Merit of Italy

Sara María Ivonne Haza del Castillo (25 December 1938 – 16 June 2022) was an operatic soprano from the Dominican Republic. In a career of more than 50 years, she appeared at the National Theatre, and also in the U.S., Puerto Rico, Mexico, and Cuba. She also worked as a voice teacher, director of the National Opera, and speech therapist. She received honours from her home country and Italy, and an honorary doctorate from the Universidad Autónoma de Santo Domingo

== Early life ==
Ivonne Haza was born in Angelina, a batey of a sugarcane mill in the San Pedro de Macorís Province on 25 December 1938. Her parents were Luis Felipe Haza González, a Cuban immigrant from Matanzas, and Rita Indiana del Castillo y Rodríguez-Objío. Rita was a granddaughter of Manuel Rodríguez Objío.

== Career ==
Haza studied in the Conservatoire of Santo Domingo and debuted on 13 March 1958 as a singer, performing at the Instituto de Señoritas Salomé Ureña, arias from Handel's Messiah, in a chamber concert celebrated in the presence of Rafael Trujillo. In 1961 she studied at the Conservatorio Santa Cecilia in Rome with Elena D'Ambrossio, Inés Alfani-Tellini and Roberto Caggiano. She performed there in Paisiello's Il duelo.

Haza's repertoire covers all the genres of vocal music, including opera, operetta, works with orchestra and songs. With the National Symphonic Orchestra of the Dominican Republic she collaborated with Dominican conductors Manuel Simó, Carlos Piantini, Rafael Villanueva, Manuel Marino Miniño, and José Antonio Molina, and with guest directors such as Roberto Caggiano, Carlos Chávez, Enrique García Asencio, Paul Engel and Robert Carter Austin. Among her notable colleagues were Olga Azar, Arístides Incháustegui, Luís Rivera, Roberto Caggiano, Lilliam Columna, Jacinto Gimbernard, Luis Cold Sandoval, Rafael Félix Gimbernard, Rafael Sánchez Cestero, Rafael Félix, Manuel Simó, Dagmar White, Creole Hidalgo, Fausto Cepeda, Luis Cold, Rafael Gil Castro, Vito Castorina, and Enriquillo Cerón.

Haza sang works by Maurice Ravel, Heitor Villa-Lobos, Lukas Foss, José of Jesús Ravelo, Leo Brouwer and Enrique of Marchena, among others. She played leading roles in operas such as Mascagni's Cavalleria rusticana, Leoncavallo's Los Payasos, and zarzuelas including Torroba's Luisa Fernanda, La leyenda del beso, and El cafetal. Outside of the Dominican Republic, she performed in the United States, Puerto Rico, Mexico, and Cuba. She participated with pianist Manuel Rueda in the Latin Festival-American of the Arts. In 1988, she participated in the Festival Cervantino in Mexico and the Dominican Republic with the pianist María of Fátima Geraldes. That same year she recorded the CDs Entrega (Delivery), Joyas de Navidad (Joy of Christmas) and Sueños (Dreams). On the occasion of her 50th anniversary as a singer, a concert was staged at the National Theatre, conducted by Julio De Windt.

Additionally, Haza taught during many years in the National Conservatoire of Music, and was artistic director of the National Theatre for five years. She also directed the Lyric Singers of Fine Arts. She also worked as a speech therapist.

A book about Haza and her career, Ivonne Haza: la diva dominicana (The Dominican diva), was published in 2011, presented in a ceremony by the Central Bank of the Dominican Republic which published it. Haza was awarded the Order of the Dominicos of Duarte of Sánchez and Mella of the Dominican Republic and the Order of Merit of Italy. She received an honorary doctorate from the Universidad Autónoma de Santo Domingo.

== Personal life ==
Ancestors of Ivonne Haza

4. Luis Felipe Haza
2. Luis Felipe Haza González
5. Sara González
1. Sara María “Ivonne” Haza del Castillo (1938–2022)
12. Benigno del Castillo (1830–1861)
6. Luis Temístocles del Castillo García (1854–1922)
13. Gabina García Perdomo (1826–?)
3. Rita Indiana del Castillo y Rodríguez-Objío
14. Manuel Rodríguez Objío (1838–1871)
7. Dolores Eloísa Rodríguez-Objío Reyes (1867–1941)
15. Rita Altagracia Reyes García (1843–1902)

Haza was married to the architect Víctor Bisonó Pichardo (1933–2017); the couple had four children: Vilma Rebeca; Víctor, who became minister of industry and commerce; Marcos; and Rita Ivonne Bisonó Haza. She was aunt of journalist Óscar Haza and grand-aunt of singer Rita Indiana. She was second cousin of banker Alejandro Grullón as the both of them were great-grandchildren of Manuel Rodríguez Objío and his wife María del Rosario Ravelo.

Haza died on 16 June 2022 at age 83.
