= Rita Indiana y los Misterios =

Dominican alternative merengue band

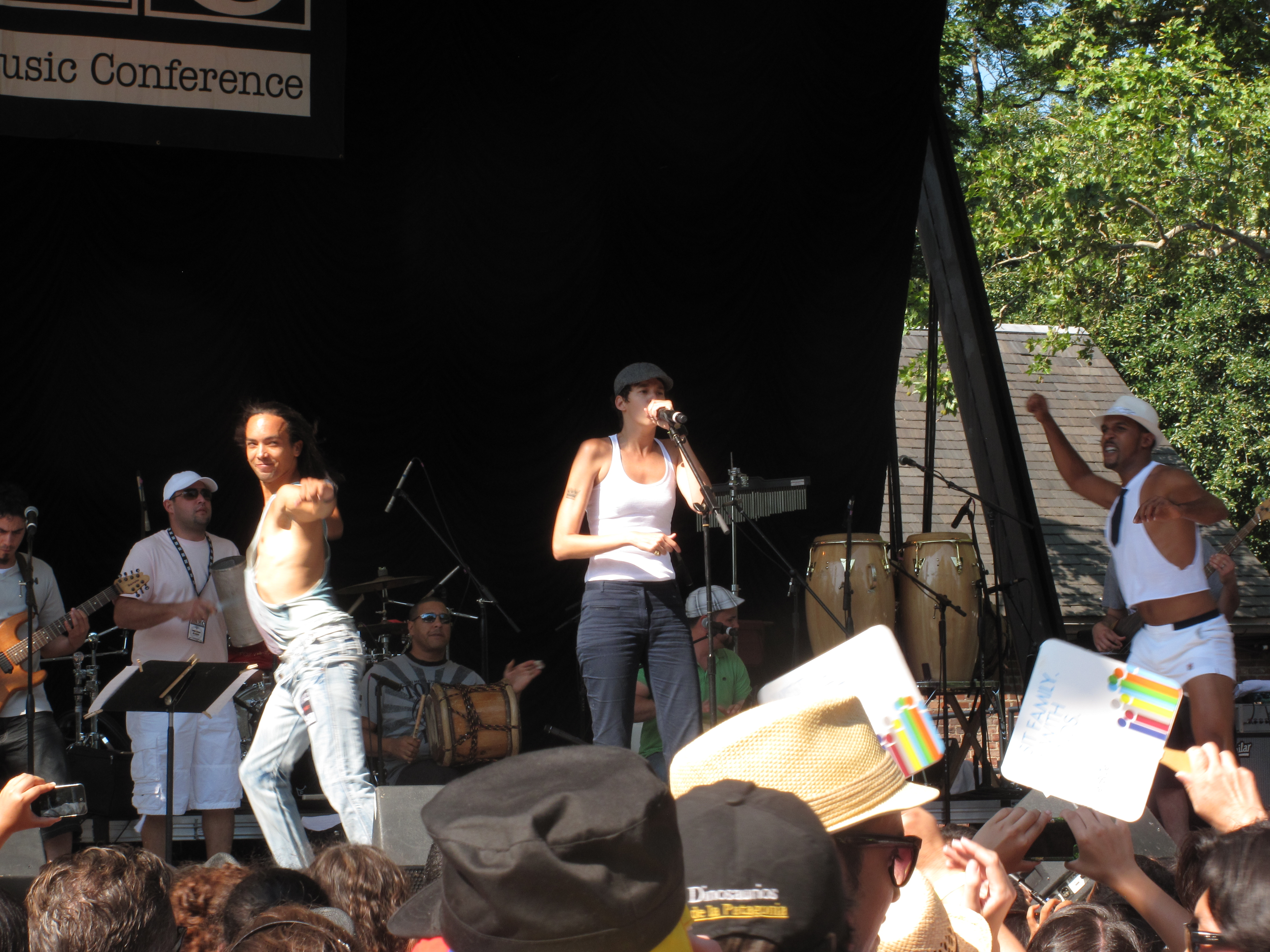
Rita Indiana y Los Misterios performing at Central Park Summer Stage, NYC, 2011

Rita Indiana y los Misterios is an alternative merengue band based in Santo Domingo, Dominican Republic. The band is led by the vocalist Rita Indiana. Since late 2008 the band enjoyed great popularity for creating music using the sounds of traditional merengue and incorporating tastes of alternative rock and electronic music. Rita Indiana y los Misterios has performed in numerous locations of Santo Domingo including the Hard Rock Cafe. Some popular songs of the group are "Jardinera", "El Blu del Ping Pong", "La Hora de Volve", "Equeibol". Rita Indiana has been very successful in the Santo Domingo alternative scene constantly playing in Casa De Teatro, Hard Rock Cafe, and other small venues. They have been featured extensively in many prominent music magazines and websites like NPR Music, FADER and Club Fonograma for their new, experimental sound.

== Musical style ==
Rita Indiana y Los Misterios have composed music using the traditional merengue of Dominican Republic but at the same time putting influences of the modern alternative music and incorporating the electric guitar as a main instrument and electronic effects. The music is as danceable as traditional merengue but varies in tempo and rhythm. Many of their songs have a very fast tempo that reveals the influences of fast speed music genres such as drum and bass.

== Current members ==
- Rita Indiana (Lead vocalist)
- Eddy Nuñez
- Andrew Ramirez "Carrú"
- Gabo Lora
- Boli

== Songs released ==
- "El Blu del Ping Pong"
- "La Hora de Volvé"
- "Jardinera"
- "Equeibol"
- "El Juidero"
- "Da Pa Lo Do"
- "Maldito Feisbú"
- "Bajito a Selva"
- "Platanitos"
- "Nos 'Ta Llevando el Diablo"
- "Oigo Voces"
- "Pásame a Buscá"
- "La Sofi"
- "Dame Los Poderes"
- "Tony 'Ta"
- "Como Un Ladrón en la Noche"
- "Be Stupid"
- "Qué e' la Tiradera"
- "Qué Bueno 'Ta"
- "El Castigador"

== See also ==
- Dominican rock
- Merengue
- Music of Dominican Republic
