= Juncalito =

- Location within the Dominican Republic
- Coordinates: 19°13′12″N 70°49′12″W
- Country: Dominican Republic
- Province: Santiago

Government
  - Sindico de Juncalito: Elbis Inoa (Present)
- Elevation: 965 m (3,166 ft)

Population (2008)
  - Total: 1 353
- Website: https://ayuntamientodejuncalito.blogspot.com/p/historia.html

The town of Juncalito is a municipal district within the municipality of Jánico, in the Santiago province of the Dominican Republic.

Juncalito is a municipal district of Jánico, is located in the Cordillera Central at an altitude of more than 1,000 meters above sea level (3,290 feet), 59 kilometers from the city of Santiago de los Caballeros. It is a centennial community, this place was chosen by its founders for the conditions it has for agricultural production. Although geographical accidents make the urbanization process difficult, the population of Juncalito has grown considerably due to the many positive factors that it has such as climate, and the little pollution that exists in this community. The municipal district Juncalito has a population of approximately 8,000 people, of which more than 60% live in the communities surrounding the town. The population of Juncalito is relatively young. 30 percent of the population lives abroad or has stayed in other towns in search of better living conditions. Juncalito has a pleasant climate and ideal mountain landscapes to fully enjoy the nature of the Central Mountain Range. The geography of Juncalito is in mountainous with very few plains. A short distance from the town is the peak Cacique with a height of 1,300 meters above sea level. In addition to its beautiful mountain landscapes, its lands are bathed by the waters of the Gurabo and Jagua rivers, the latter much visited by local people and other people. Economy The main source of economy in Juncalito is agriculture, its main product is coffee that takes advantage of favorable conditions, such as the height and cool climate of the mountains. This is one of the most important coffee plantations in the country, producing one of the best coffees in the world, where there are around 1,500 coffee producers between large, medium and small. Besides coffee, there is a minor vegetable production in juncalito, mostly for domestic consumption.

- – World-Gazetteer.com
