= Sabana Iglesia =

- Location within the Dominican Republic
- Coordinates: 19°19′48″N 70°45′0″W
- Country: Dominican Republic
- Province: Santiago
- Established as a Municipality: May 18, 2007

Area
  - Total: 58.3 km^{2} (22.5 sq mi)

Population (2012)
  - Total: 13,348
  - Density: 229/km^{2} (593/sq mi)

Sabana Iglesia is a town and municipality in the Santiago province of the Dominican Republic. Santiago is part of the northern valley of the country, otherwise known as the Cibao. Sabana Iglesia is located south of Santiago de los Caballeros, the second-largest city in the Dominican Republic, and sits just north of the country's second-tallest dam, the Bao Dam, surrounded by the mountains of the Cordillera Central.

== History ==
Sabana Iglesia's founding date is unclear, however, for long it was a rural section of the municipality of Santiago that was eventually converted into a municipal district in November 1987. In February 2007 this municipal district was elevated to a municipality that includes the rural sections of Sabana Iglesia, Los Ranchos de Babosico and La Zanja. Much of the town's earliest development is attributed to Generosa Ferreira, who established Sabana Iglesia's first church, school, library and clinic which are still in operation today.

== Notable people ==
Jose Lima (1972-2010) – baseball player

Captain Fernando Valerio (1806-1863) - Hero of the Independence

== Sources ==
- – World-Gazetteer.com
