= Rita Indiana =

Dominican writer and singer-songwriter (born 1977)

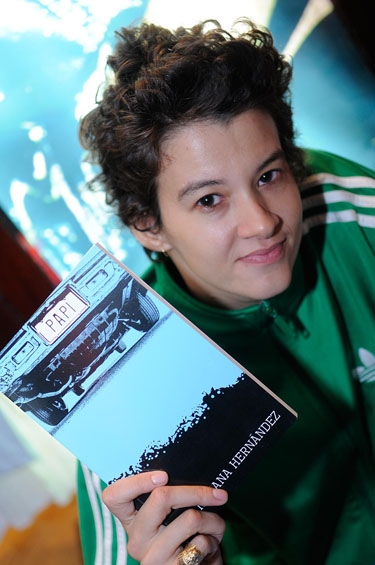
- Indiana in 2013

Background information
- Born: Rita Indiana Hernández Sánchez; 11 June 1977 (age 49); Santo Domingo, Dominican Republic
- Origin: Puerto Rico
- Genre: Merengue
- Occupations: Writer, singer-songwriter
- Instruments: Vocals; guitar
- Years active: 2006–present
- Label: Universal Music
- Musical career
- Member of: Rita Indiana y los Misterios

Rita Indiana Hernández Sánchez (born 11 June 1977) is a Dominican writer and singer-songwriter. In 2011, she was selected by the Spanish newspaper El País as one of the 100 most influential Latino personalities. Her novels prominently feature themes of queerness while the topics of her songs range from Dominican social issues to divergent sexuality. Rita Indiana has been highly recognized and awarded on the Caribbean literary scene, and her viral music success has made Indiana a household name in the Dominican Republic where she is popularly referred to as "La Monstra" (the monster).

== Early life and education ==
Born in Santo Domingo in 1977, Rita Indiana is the grand-niece of the soprano Ivonne Haza and great-great-great-granddaughter of the poet and hero of the Restoration War, Manuel Rodríguez Objío. She is also second cousin of the journalist Óscar Haza and of the politician Ito Bisonó. She was baptized in honor of her great-grandmother Rita Indiana del Castillo y Rodríguez-Objío.

Rita Indiana attended El Colegio Calasanz for 14 years. After finishing her schooling, she continued her education at the Autonomous University in Santo Domingo where she studied Art History. However, she left this course a year after admittance. Rita Indiana then attended Altos de Chavón School of Design but once again left her schooling and decided to pursue a career in writing.

== Literary career ==
Rita Indiana admits to having a passion for reading and writing from a young age. The work that first sparked her interest in literature was Tom Sawyer by Mark Twain. She credits her style of writing regarding marginalized youth to Twain's similar subject matter.

Rita Indiana began her writing career with short stories in the mid 1990s, shortly after leaving Autonomous University. At the age of eighteen, Rita Indiana published her first short stories in the only literary magazine in the Dominican Republic at the time. After leaving Altos de Chavon School of Design, she was able to write and publish her first novel La Estrategia de Chochueca in 2000. La Estrategia de Chochueca belongs to her trilogy La trilogía de niñas locas, which also include Papi (2005), and Nombres y Animales (2013). These are peppered with Dominican slang and colloquialisms and center around exploring the social issues present in the Dominican Republic. This trilogy also introduced themes of nonconforming sexual identity not previously highlighted in Dominican Literature. Her early work is highly regarded for its authentic portrayal of Caribbean life and is now studied in literature courses across the United States and the Caribbean.

Rita Indiana later explored the genre of science fiction with her novel La mucama de Omicunlé (2017). She made this shift to science fiction after noticing the drastic differences in technological and social development across the Caribbean. Rita Indiana also finds that this genre lends itself to more critical social and political commentary that she has previously not been able to access in past pieces. La mucama de Omicunlé became the first Spanish-language work to receive the Grand Prize of the Association of Caribbean Writers. In 2019, the same book, translated to English, was published as Tentacle. Her sixth novel, Hecho en Saturno came out in 2018 and was translated as Made in Saturn, published by And Other Stories in 2020.

== Music career ==
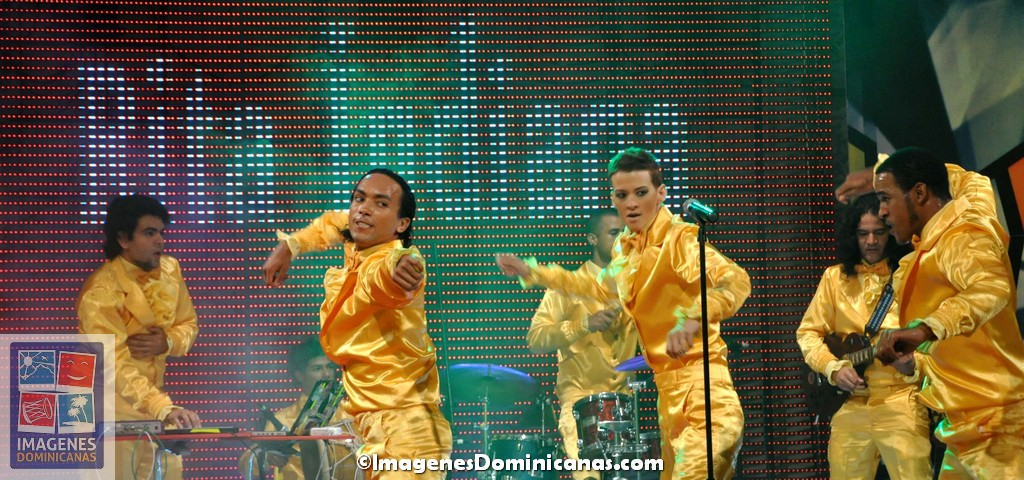
Rita Indiana y Los Misterios, 2010

Rita Indiana moved to Puerto Rico in the mid 2000s and began exploring the realm of music despite never taking music lessons or showing much interest in the music industry. Eventually, she produced the single "Altar Epandex in duo with Miti Miti" after discovering her ear for creating electro-merengue beats on music computer software. This single was very well received and was chosen by New York City's Daily News as one of the top 5 indie jewels of 2008. Rita Indiana's sound is heavily inspired by Dominican popular music, including meringue and salsa. She is often credited with reinventing merengue dancing through her compositions and interpretations of Afro-Caribbean rhythms and electric beats. In 2009, Rita Indiana banded with a group known as Los Misterios and together they went on to release several more singles along with a complete album titled El Juidero in 2010. This album married the sounds of analog and digital music and reached viral success across several online platforms.

Rita India y Los Misterios have become popularly followed both by people in the Dominican Republic and beyond. The subject of their music frequently feature themes of culture and sexual identity as well as social issues of the Caribbean. One of their most popular singles "La hora de volvé", comments on the frequent immigration of Dominicans to the United States. The songs speaks about the hardships these individuals face in the Dominican Republic and Caribbean as well as the hardships they experience in the United States. It is now seen as an anthem by Dominicans all over the world as its lyrics inspire listeners to value their roots and calls on them to return home.

At the height of their success, Rita Indiana y Los Misterios played at many sold-out venues, including Santo Domingo Hard Rock Café. The group was also nominated for the Casandra Award in the category "Revelation of the Year" in 2010. With her band, Indiana appeared at the celebrated venue SOB's in New York and NPR included her El Juidero in their list "Top 10 Latin American Albums of 2010". She was given the nickname "La Monstra", translated to "the monster". Indiana released her most latest single in 2017 called "El Castigador" after going on a hiatus for several years.

Indiana's primary focus is on her literary career than creating music. She admitted that she disliked the "pop fame", and she wanted to walk the streets without being recognized everywhere she goes. Rita Indiana also appreciated the autonomy and independence of writing whereas producing music required extensive collaboration. She has stated that she feels comfortable with her decision to leave the pop music industry where her career felt as if it happened somewhat by accident. However, she continued to produce music for other artists and musicians.

Rita Indiana has written songs for influential Latin American musicians Julieta Venegas and Calle 13.

== Film career ==
Indiana played the role of Señora Dios in Mosh (2019) by Juan Antonio Bisono. Indiana's novel Papi (2005) was adapted into the feature film Papi (2020) directed by Noelia Quintero, of which Indiana was an associate producer and composer, on top of playing the role of Muerta.

== Personal life and influence ==
At the 2010 Casandra Awards in 2010, Rita Indiana attended the prestigious event with her partner Noelia Quintero, whom she held hands with and kissed throughout that evening. Rita Indiana was met with public backlash and criticism. Many media outlets expressed disapproval of the pair's public display of affection and labeled this event as Indiana's official public outing. However, Rita Indiana's musical and literary career seemed to be unaffected by the controversies and she continued to discuss both her sexuality and her relationship openly with the public. Through her work and her interviews, Indiana has established her stance against the social norms surrounding sexual and gender identity in the Caribbean. Aware of the ambiguity of her appearance, the writer rejects the notion of labels and expresses her discomfort with the pressure of these norms and says, "Labels exist because they have a function. . . I’ve been dealing with labels all my life: Tomboy, headbanger, weirdo or lesbian, underground, celebrity. Labels are caricatures." Because of her vocal ideas on queerness, Rita Indiana has become a key advocate of the queer community in the Caribbean and continues to use her work to create a space in which a heterogeneous, multiple and complex Caribbean reality is reflected. Though Indiana is not publicly involved in queer politics, by representing the queer community in her work, Indiana uses her musical and literary influence to act as a cultural counter-strategy against homophobia and gender oppression seen in the Caribbean.

== Awards and nominations ==
- Nominated for her novel "La mucama de Omicunlé" from the Premio Bienal de Novela Mario Vargas Llosa
- Award for her novel "La mucama de Omicunlé" from the Grand Prix Littéraire Région Guadeloupe

== Published works ==
=== Short stories ===
- Rumiantes, Riann, Santo Domingo, 1998.
- Ciencia Succión, Amigo del Hogar, 2001.
- Cuentos y poemas (1998-2003), Ediciones Cielonaranja, Santo Domingo, 2017.

=== Novels ===
- La estrategia de Chochueca, Riann, 2000
- Papi, Vértigo, 2005; Periférica, 2011
  - English Translation: Papi: A Novel, University of Chicago Press, 2016
- Nombres y Animales, Periférica, 2013
- La mucama de Omicunlé, Periférica, 2015
  - English Translation: Tentacle, And Other Stories, 2019
- Hecho en Saturno, Periférica, 2018
  - English translation: Made in Saturn, And Other Stories, 2020
- Asmodeo, Periférica, 2024

== Discography ==
- El Juidero (2010)
- Mandinga Times (2020)

=== Singles ===
- "Altar Epandex in duo with Miti Miti"
- "El Blu del Ping Pong"
- "La Hora de Volve"
- "Jardinera"
- "Equeibol"
- "El Juidero"
- "Oigo Voces"
- "Flores de Fuego"
- "Da Pa Lo Do"
- "Como un ladrón en la noche"
- "Bajito a selva*"
- "Maldito Feisbu"
- "El Castigador"
