= Carlos Bonilla Sánchez =

Dominican businessman and politician

Carlos Bonilla Sanchez

Minister of Housing, Habitat and Buildings of the Dominican Republic
- Incumbent
- Assumed office August 16, 2020

Personal details
- Born: December 26, 1979 (age 46) Santo Domingo, Dominican Republic
- Education: Florida International University
- Occupation: Dominican businessman

Carlos Bonilla Sánchez (December 26, 1979 in Santo Domingo, Dominican Republic) is the current Minister of Housing, Habitat and Buildings of the Dominican Republic under the presidency of Luis Abinader. Between 2020 until 2021 was director of the National Housing Institute (INVI). Bonilla Sánchez studied civil engineering and graduated from the Instituto Tecnológico de Santo Domingo. He also got a master's degree in Construction Management from Florida International University.
