= Tentacle (botany) =

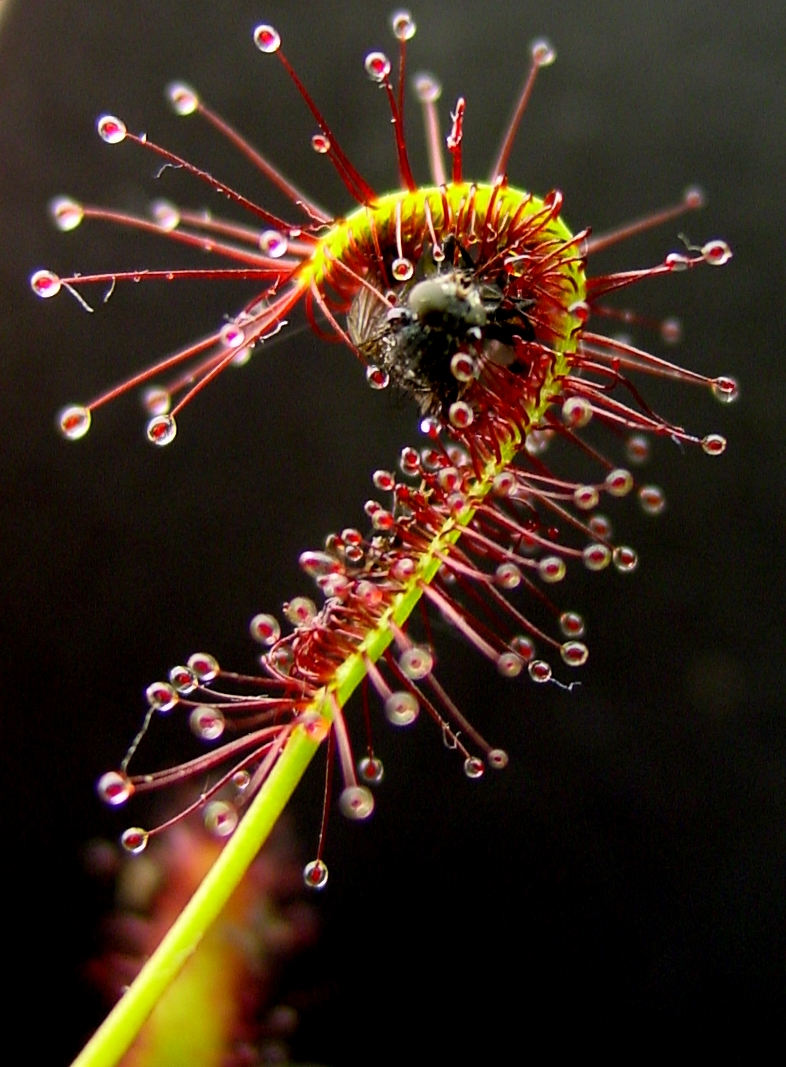
Leaf and tentacle movement on Cape sundew

In botany, tentacles are glandular hairs on the leaves of some species of insectivorous plants such as Drosera (sundews). Tentacles are different from organs such as the tendrils of climbing plants.

In carnivorous plants such as sundews, the tentacles are the stalked glands of the upper surface of the leaves. They are hairlike projections with a drop of sticky mucilage which attract insects. Unlike usual plant hair which is of epidermal origin, the tentacle is highly complex and includes all the tissue types present in the leaf. It consists of a tall, tapering stalk of multi-cellular structure, topped with two layers of glandular cells. They are highly touch-sensitive. When an insect or small animal is captured, the tentacles bend inward and the leaf rolls together as shown in the picture. The glandular cells then secrete enzymes to dissolve and digest the insect.
