= Universidad de la Tercera Edad =

University in Santo Domingo, Dominican Republic

Universidad de la Tercera Edad (UTE) is a university in Santo Domingo in the Dominican Republic.
