= Tentacle (novel) =

2015 novel by Rita Indiana

- Author: Rita Indiana
- Original title: La mucama de omicunlé
- Language: Spanish
- Genre: Science Fiction
- Publication date: 2015
- English publication date: 2018
- Pages: 184
- ISBN: 978-8416291083
- Preceded by: Nombres y Animales
- Followed by: Hecho en Saturno

Tentacle (Spanish: La mucama de Omicunlé, translation: Omicunlé's maid) is a 2015 novel by the Dominican writer and musician Rita Indiana. It is a work of experimental science-fiction, and it revolves around questions of race, gender, environmental change, music and time-travel.

== Plot ==
The book's main character is Acilde Figueora, who works as a maid for Esther Escudero. She lives in the Dominican Republic of 2027, which is no longer the beautiful paradise it once was, because its president, Said Bona, accepted to harbor a number of biological weapons that spilled into the oceans, wreaking environmental havoc in the process.

Acilde worked as a sex worker, who cross-dressed to appear as a young boy in order to attract male clients. One of her clients is the young and good-looking doctor Eric Vitier. They have sex, though Acilde insists on only offering oral sex, which prompts Eric to rape her, and then offer her a job with Esther, who is a friend and --- unbeknownst to Acilde at the time --- part of a religious Yoruba cult, which centers around an almighty anemone, whose tentacles can grant a person time-traveling powers. Acilde agrees to work for Esther, in order to save up money for her gender transition. Esther eventually passes on her secret magical powers to Acilde, who with the help of Eric transitions. Acilde thus acquires the ability to travel back in time. The narrative now acquires two additional temporal strands: one in which Acilde travels back to the 2000s to become Giorgio Menicucci, a music manager who is married to Linda Goldman. He also travels back even further in time back to the time of Spanish colonialization of the Americas in the 15th century, where he lives as the pirate Roque. In both of these strands he encounters Argenis, who was also touched by the anemone when he was deep-sea diving, and thus also possesses the ability to travel through time.

Giorgio eventually encounters Said Bona, then just a middling DJ, with the task to dissuade him from accepting to harbor several nuclear weapons. At this point, a plot twist occurs. It turns out that although Acilde is the Chosen One as the prophecy foretold, he in fact subverts his secret powers, in order to gain personal advantages. He enjoys his life as a man, abandons his future self of Acilde, decides to live as a man, and thus also refuses to sway Bona from accepting Venezuelan biological weapons after becoming president. The novel ends with Linda resting her head in Giorgio's lap.

== Characters ==
- Acilde Figueora/Roque/Giorgio Menicucci: main character, first works as sex worker, then maid, eventually transitions and travels back in time.
- Esther Escudero/Omicunlé: boss of Acilde, and incarnation of Omicunlé, possesses secret powers and sacrifices herself.
- Eric Vitier: Young and good-looking doctor. Hires Acilde and later helps them to transition, dies during the process.
- Argenis Luna: Misogynistic and homophobic art student, who travels back in time through the power of the anemone, has repressed homosexual desires.
- Said Bona: DJ, later president of the Dominican Republic.
- Linda Goldman: wife of Giorgio Menicucci and environmental scientist.

== Style ==
The novel's style has been described as free-floating, "pulpy", marked by "bloody violence, brutish sex, and futuristic flourishes."

The three different temporalities --- Acilde's 2027 self, his early 2000 Giorgio self, his Roque self, as part of the pirates during the Spanish main --- create a complex intermixing of narrative planes, with the tense changing mid-paragraph. The protagonist's pronouns change from "she" to "he" once Acilde transitions. His digital footprint however still reads as "woman."

== Reception ==
The book has been well-received by critics, who have lauded it as being "dizzying".
