= San José de las Matas =

Sajoma
- San José de las Matas
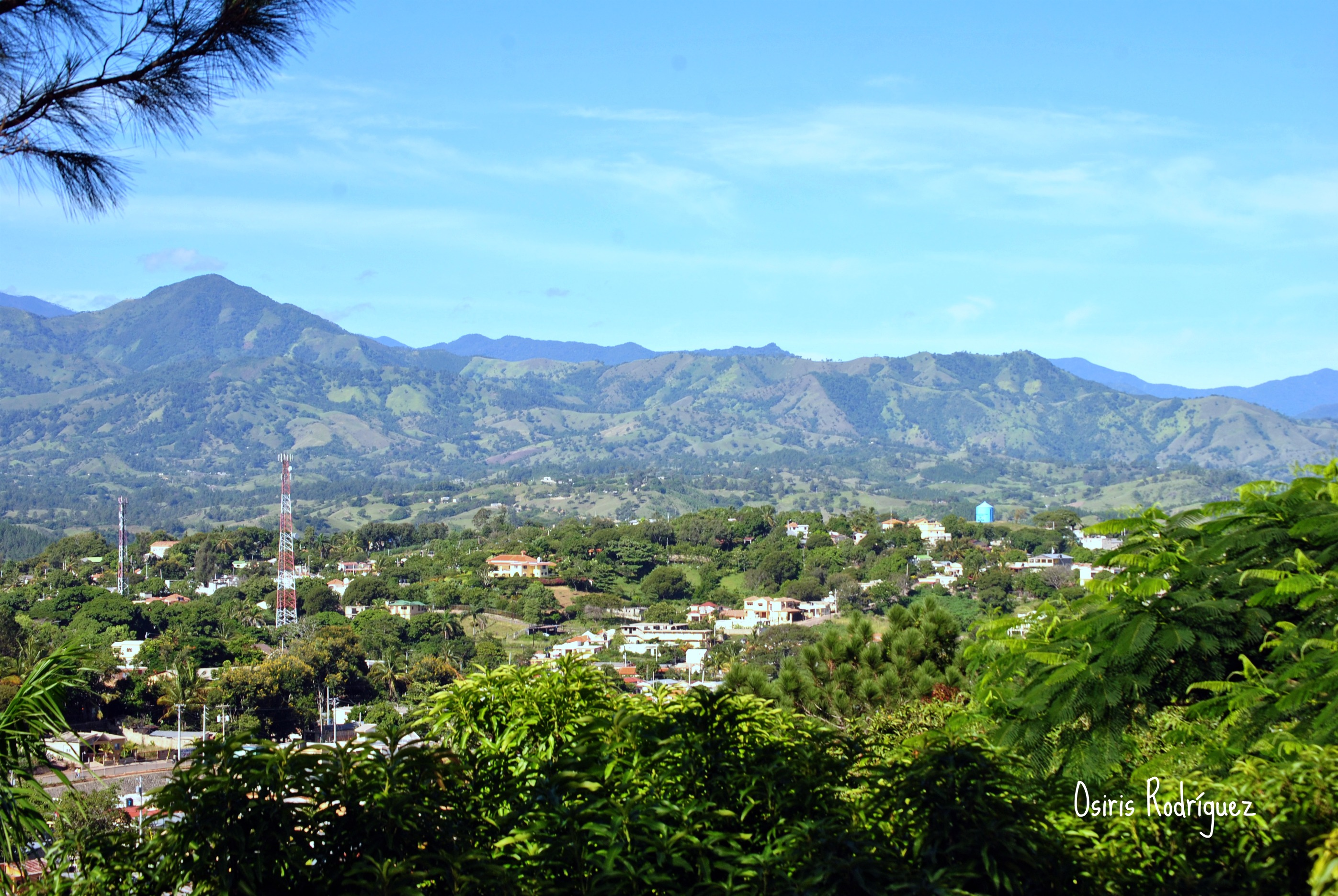
- View of San José de las Matas

- San José de las Matas in the Dominican Republic
- Coordinates: 19°19′48″N 70°55′48″W
- Country (Island): Dominican Republic
- Province: Santiago

Area
  - Total: 1,502.83 km^{2} (580.25 sq mi)
- Elevation: 523 m (1,716 ft)

Population (2012)
  - Total: 109,071
  - Density: 72.5771/km^{2} (187.974/sq mi)
- Demonyms: matero (masc.), matera (fem.)
- Municipal Districts: 3

San José de las Matas, also known as Sajoma, (Note: Sajoma is an acronym from "San José de las Matas".) is an important municipality (municipio) of the Santiago province in the Dominican Republic. The mayor of Sajoma is Alfredo Reyes. There have been many positive changes in the last four years including the addition of a 911 system. Within the municipality there are three municipal districts (distritos municipal): El Rubio, La Cuesta and Las Placetas.

== Climate ==
San José de Las Matas has a tropical monsoon climate (Köppen climate classification: Am) with two short, dry seasons and two heavy monsoons during most of the year.

== Overview ==
San José de Las Matas, also known as "Sajoma", in the province of Santiago, is one of the fastest growing municipalities in ecotourism.

The progress exhibited by this town is the result of a 10-year development plan that emerged in 2010.

San José de Las Matas is Located in an area of 1,506 square kilometers. It borders San Juan de la Maguana, Santiago Rodríguez, Jánico and Santiago.

Thousands visit the town every month, where they receive the fresh breeze from the central mountain range.

== Parks ==
Ariel Díaz, Administrator of the three tourist parks: Aguas Calientes, El Temático Arroyo Hondo and Parque Acuático la Ventana. The first river depends on the Bao River and is known for its sulfur and other mineral content, where hundreds of people go for its healing properties for the skin.

This is the preferred place for its hot waters spilled from a stone, in the middle of the tributary river.

In Arroyo Hondo is the first hydroelectric plant in the country, built by Rafael Leonidas Trujillo. It is composed of children's areas, Swimming pool, as well as extreme sports in the air.

On the Ámina river, the La Ventana spa is one of the most iconic rivers in the area due to its perforated rock that gives it the appearance of a window, in the community of Inoa, with its crystalline waters clean naturally preserve free of contamination.

Hundreds of people come to tourist parks come from different parts of the country, including Higüey, Barahona, Santiago, Santo Domingo, San Cristóbal, La Vega, and it is increasing.

Apart from the three main parks, there are others parks such as The Milagrosa Chapel, Mirador el Fuerte Parks, the entrance sign to the municipality, La Empanada de Leonora, as well as Club Hacienda Campo Verde.

This last one has a river, pool, restaurant and other attractions, and the Casabe Fair, where for three days more than five thousand people attend. The event is repeated every year.

== Notes ==
Climate data for San José de Las Matas (1961–1990)
Month	Jan	Feb	Mar	Apr	May	Jun	Jul	Aug	Sep	Oct	Nov	Dec	Year
Record high °C (°F)	32.8 (91.0)	33.8 (92.8)	35.2 (95.4)	36.2 (97.2)	35.6 (96.1)	36.9 (98.4)	37.6 (99.7)	37.6 (99.7)	36.2 (97.2)	37.2 (99.0)	35.2 (95.4)	32.8 (91.0)	37.6 (99.7)
Mean daily maximum °C (°F)	26.8 (80.2)	27.3 (81.1)	28.4 (83.1)	29.5 (85.1)	30.2 (86.4)	31.1 (88.0)	31.7 (89.1)	32.0 (89.6)	32.0 (89.6)	30.9 (87.6)	28.7 (83.7)	26.9 (80.4)	29.6 (85.3)
Mean daily minimum °C (°F)	15.9 (60.6)	16.2 (61.2)	17.2 (63.0)	18.2 (64.8)	19.5 (67.1)	20.0 (68.0)	20.4 (68.7)	20.4 (68.7)	20.1 (68.2)	19.5 (67.1)	18.3 (64.9)	16.7 (62.1)	18.5 (65.3)
Record low °C (°F)	10.0 (50.0)	10.0 (50.0)	11.0 (51.8)	12.2 (54.0)	13.8 (56.8)	14.4 (57.9)	14.8 (58.6)	15.4 (59.7)	14.4 (57.9)	12.4 (54.3)	12.2 (54.0)	10.8 (51.4)	10.0 (50.0)
Average rainfall mm (inches)	56.6 (2.23)	65.6 (2.58)	75.5 (2.97)	150.3 (5.92)	203.4 (8.01)	101.2 (3.98)	52.1 (2.05)	64.4 (2.54)	119.2 (4.69)	142.5 (5.61)	116.7 (4.59)	79.1 (3.11)	1,226.6 (48.29)
Average rainy days (≥ 1.0 mm)	7.0	6.0	6.7	9.5	13.1	8.3	5.4	6.2	8.4	10.4	10.2	9.3	100.5
Source: NOAA
