= Óscar Haza =

Dominican journalist (born 1951)

Oscar Haza (born December 12, 1951) is a journalist from the Dominican Republic.

At the age of 22, Haza moved to Miami to pursue his career in journalism. He is host of the Channel 22 news talk show Ahora Con Oscar Haza which airs on Mega TV. The topics of his programming range from current cultural issues and local news to a recurring South Florida topic: Cuba. His audience is composed mostly of Cuban Americans and South Florida Hispanics. His guests are usually the most important people in the current news cycle, including ambassadors, former presidents, governors, political analysts, famous writers, and artists.

== Personal life ==
On December 21, 2010, Haza had a quadruple bypass operation in Miami.

== See also ==
- Faride Raful
- Freddy Ginebra
- Geovanny Vicente
- Nuria Piera
- Miguel Franjul
- Pedro Henríquez Ureña
- Orlando Martínez Howley
- Tony Dandrades
