= Miss Dominican Republic 1995 =

- Date: December 2, 1994
- Venue: Renaissance Auditorio de Festival del Hotel Jaragua, Santo Domingo, Dominican Republic
- Broadcaster: Telemicro
- Entrants: 30
- Winner: Cándida Yesenia Lara Betances; San Cristóbal

Miss República Dominicana 1995 was held on December 2, 1994. There were 30 candidates, representing provinces and municipalities, who entered. The winner would represent the Dominican Republic at Miss Universe 1995 and Miss International 1995. The first runner up would enter Miss World 1995. The second runner up would enter in Reina Mundial del Banano 1995. The rest of finalist entered different pageants.

== Results ==
=== Placements ===
Placement	Contestant
Miss Dominican Republic 1995	San Cristóbal – Cándida Lara Betances
1st Runner-Up	El Seibo – Patricia Bayonet
2nd Runner-Up	Valverde – Jeimy Bacar
3rd Runner-Up	Santiago – Jacqueline Cid
4th Runner-Up	Puerto Plata – María Pedemonte
5th Runner-Up	San Francisco de Macorís – Arelis Pichrado
Top 16	Monte Cristi – Ninoska Peña; Santiago Rodríguez – Rosaura Tavares; Río San Juan – Miosoty Socrates; Baoruco – Suany Aroyo; Elías Piña – Silvana Ramos; Monte Plata – Mariela Montás; Distrito Nacional – Ángela Bianca Echavarria; Cabrera – María Teládre; San Juan – Maite Landro

== Delegates ==
Represented	Contestant	Age	Height	Hometown
Azua	Rosa María Suarez Acosta	20	1.74 m (5 ft 8 1/2 in)	Santo Domingo
Baoruco	Suany Aroyo Medina	19	1.77 m (5 ft 9 3/4 in)	Santo Domingo
Bonao	Laura Lialda Germán	17	1.79 m (5 ft 10 1/2 in)	Santo Domingo
Cabrera	María Eugenia Teládre Batista	18	1.75 m (5 ft 9 in)	Cabrera
Distrito Nacional	Angela Bianca Echavarria	17	1.80 m (5 ft 10 3/4 in)	Santo Domingo
El Seibo	Patricia Bayonet Robles	20	1.75 m (5 ft 9 in)	Santiago de los Caballeros
Elías Piña	Silvana Ramos Pucheaux	19	1.84 m (6 ft 1/2 in)	Comendador
Hato Mayor	Fiona Leonidas de la Cruz	24	1.80 m (5 ft 10 3/4 in)	Santo Domingo
Jarabacoa	Milagros García Oviedo	23	1.76 m (5 ft 9 1/4 in)	Santo Domingo
La Altagracia	Clara María Taveras de Moya	22	1.79 m (5 ft 10 1/2 in)	La Romana
La Romana	Cindy Katherin Olivarre Sousa	20	1.69 m (5 ft 6 1/2 in)	La Romana
La Vega	Laura Julissa Pineda Rodríguez	25	1.81 m (5 ft 11 1/4 in)	Concepción de La Vega
Las Matas de Farfán	Odelkis Marlene Henríquez Ríos	20	1.73 m (5 ft 8 in)	San Juan de la Maguana
Moca	Eva Marilyn Soto Riosanchez	21	1.76 m (5 ft 9 1/4 in)	Moca
Monte Plata	Mariela Patrisia Montás Quiros	19	1.71 m (5 ft 7 1/4 in)	Monte Plata
Monte Cristi	Ninoska Altagracia Peña López	21	1.69 m (5 ft 6 1/2 in)	Santo Domingo
Pedernales	Sandra María Polanco de la Mota	23	1.79 m (5 ft 10 1/2 in)	Santo Domingo
Puerto Plata	María Luisa Pedemonte Soto	19	1.82 m (5 ft 11 3/4 in)	Cabarete
Río San Juan	Miosoty Socrates Ulerio	24	1.75 m (5 ft 9 in)	Santo Domingo
Sánchez Ramírez	Katia Aurora Ramírez Ramírez	22	1.70 m (5 ft 7 in)	Concepción de La Vega
San Cristóbal	Cándida Yesenia Lara Betances	18	1.79 m (5 ft 10 1/2 in)	Miami
San Francisco de Macorís	Arelis Pichrado de León	25	1.85 m (6 ft 3/4 in)	Santo Domingo
San José de las Matas	Arlette Castro Domínguez	23	1.81 m (5 ft 11 1/4 in)	Santiago de los Caballeros
San Juan	Maite Waleska Landro de Sosa	21	1.82 m (5 ft 11 3/4 in)	San Juan de la Maguana
San Pedro de Macorís	Andrea Mora de Sosa	19	1.71 m (5 ft 7 1/4 in)	San Pedro de Macorís
Santiago	Jacqueline Cid Rodríguez	22	1.83 m (6 ft 0 in)	Santiago de los Caballeros
Santiago Rodríguez	Rosaura Alexandra Tavares de la Cruz	23	1.76 m (5 ft 9 1/4 in)	Baitoa
Tamboril	Elizabeth Ferreira Cid	19	1.76 m (5 ft 9 1/4 in)	Santiago de los Caballeros
Valverde Mao	Jeimy Joana Hernández Bacar	23	1.77 m (5 ft 9 3/4 in)	Santa Cruz de Mao
Villa Bisonó	Laura María Báez Núñez	18	1.83 m (6 ft 0 in)	Santiago de los Caballeros
Villa González	Sarah Felicidad Alvarado Vargas	18	1.81 m (5 ft 11 1/4 in)	Santiago de los Caballeros
