= List of metropolitan areas in the Caribbean =

Overview of the largest Caribbean metro areas by population

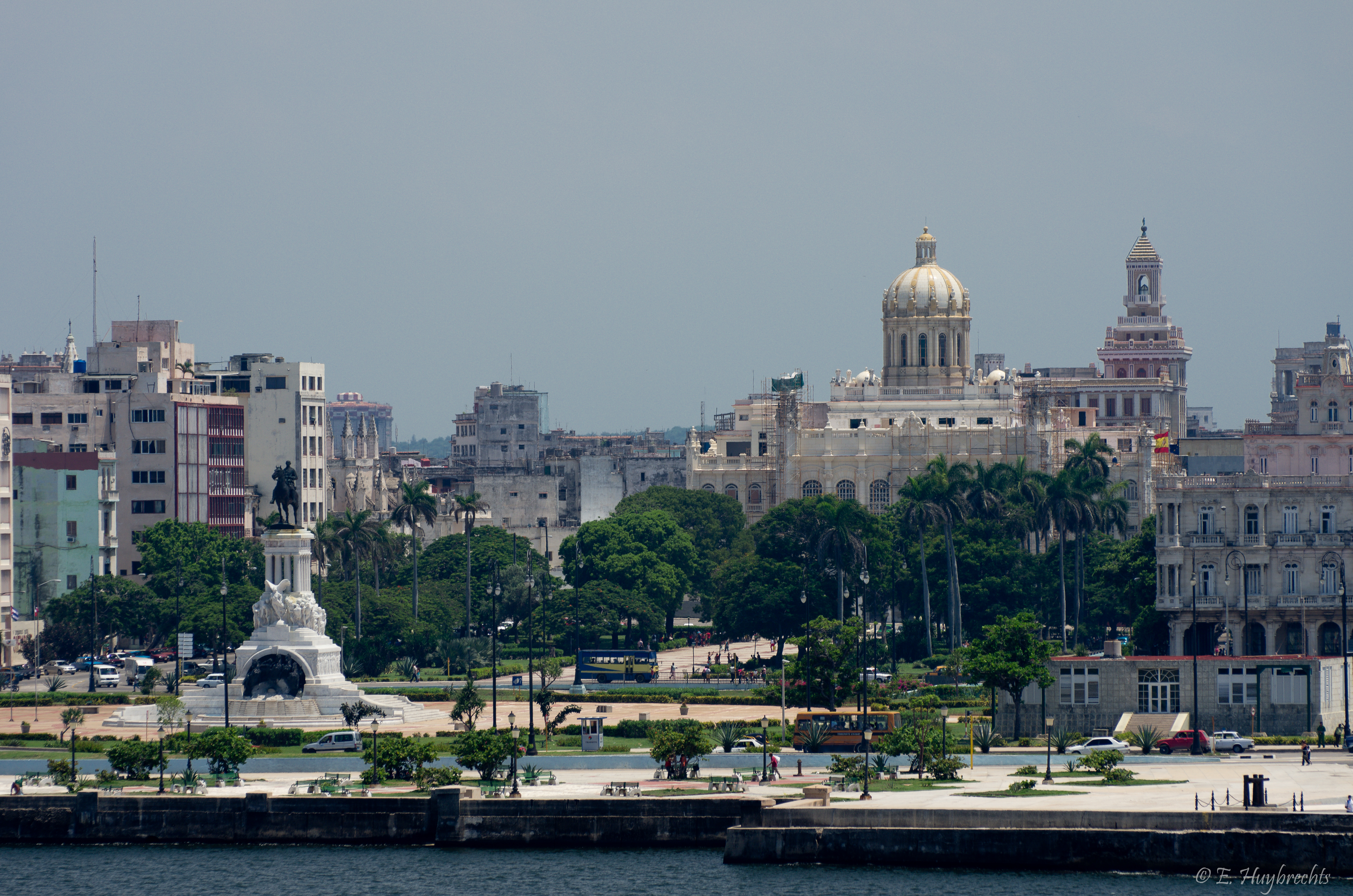
Havana

This is a list of the largest metropolitan areas in the insular Caribbean, based on the latest official population estimates or projections.

Rank	Metropolitan area	Population	Year	Country/territory
1	Santo Domingo	4,751,036	2025	Dominican Republic
2	Port-au-Prince	2,806,000	2026	Haiti
3	Havana	2,732,971	2024	Cuba
4	San Juan	2,435,733 (Note: The population of the San Juan metropolitan area is 842,535 in municipalities in its continuous conurbation and 1,193,198 in municipalities outside its urban core.)	2023	Puerto Rico
5	Kingston	1,190,763 (Note: The National Works Agency of Jamaica defines the Kingston Metropolitan Region as comprising the parishes of Kingston, Saint Catherine and Saint Andrew.)	2015	Jamaica
6	Santiago de los Caballeros	1,074,684 (Note: In 2022, Reynaldo Peguero, the director of the Santiago Development Council (Consejo de Desarrollo de Santiago, CDES), defined the metropolitan area of Santiago as comprising the municipalities of Santiago proper, Baitoa, Licey al Medio, Puñal, Tamboril and Villa González.)	2015	Dominican Republic
7	Nassau	296,522	2024	Bahamas
8	Willemstad	136,660		Curaçao
9	Port of Spain	81,142	2024	Trinidad and Tobago

== See also ==
- List of Caribbean countries by population
- List of populated places in the Caribbean
