= José Armando Castillo =

Dominican softball player (born 1950)

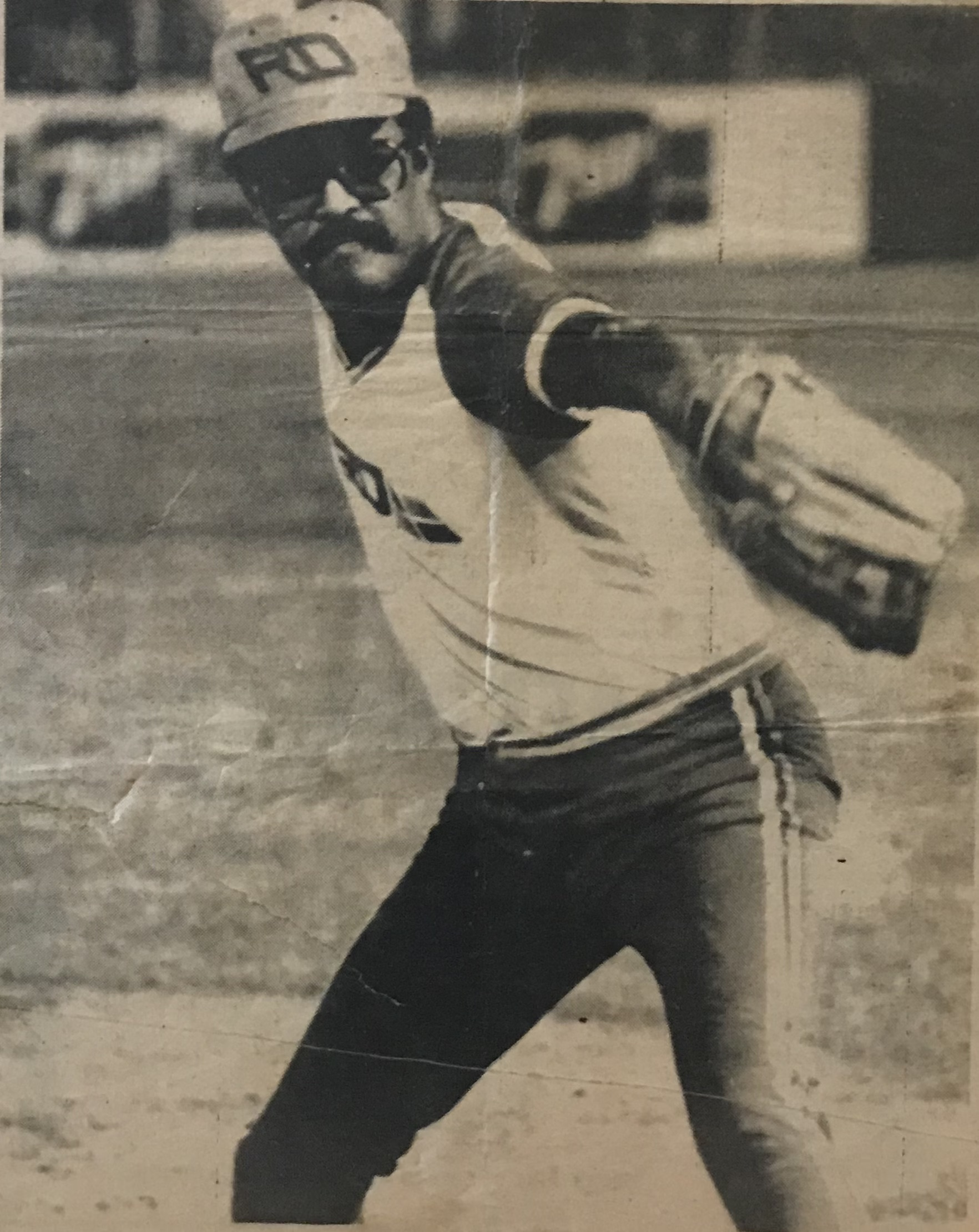
- José Armando Castillo pitching at the Central American and Caribbean Games Santiago ´86

Personal information
- Nickname: El Mago (the magician)
- National team: Pan American Games, Central American and Caribbean Games
- Citizenship: Dominican Republic
- Born: April 2, 1950 (age 75) Villa González
- Years active: 1973-2016
- Height: 6 ft 2 in (188 cm)
- Spouse: Damaris Santos

Sport
- Country: Dominican Republic
- Sport: Softball, Baseball

José Armando Castillo (José Armando Cipriano Castillo, born 2 April 1950 in Villa González, Dominican Republic) also known as El Mago (the magician), is a retired baseball and fastpitch softball pitcher of the Dominican Republic National Team. He has won several gold medals in softball in various Central American and Caribbean Games and has been a national trainer in softball. He has been selected as the Softball Player of the Century in the Dominican Republic as well as added to the Corridor of Athletes of Merit of Santiago by the Sports Press Association of Santiago de los Caballeros, Dominican Republic. In 2016, José Armando was inducted to the Hall of Fame of the Sports of Santiago.

== Career in Baseball ==
In 1973, El Mago participated as baseball pitcher in the first Central American and Caribbean Games of Second Cities in Ponce, Puerto Rico. In the same year, he also participated as pitcher in the XXI World Games for Amateur Baseball in Havana, Cuba.

In 1974, Castillo was part of the national team that represented the Dominican Republic in Guatemala, in an amateur tournament sponsored by the Federación Mundial de Béisbol Amateur, or FEMBA (World Amateur Baseball Federation). Santiago province was the one representing the country in those games.

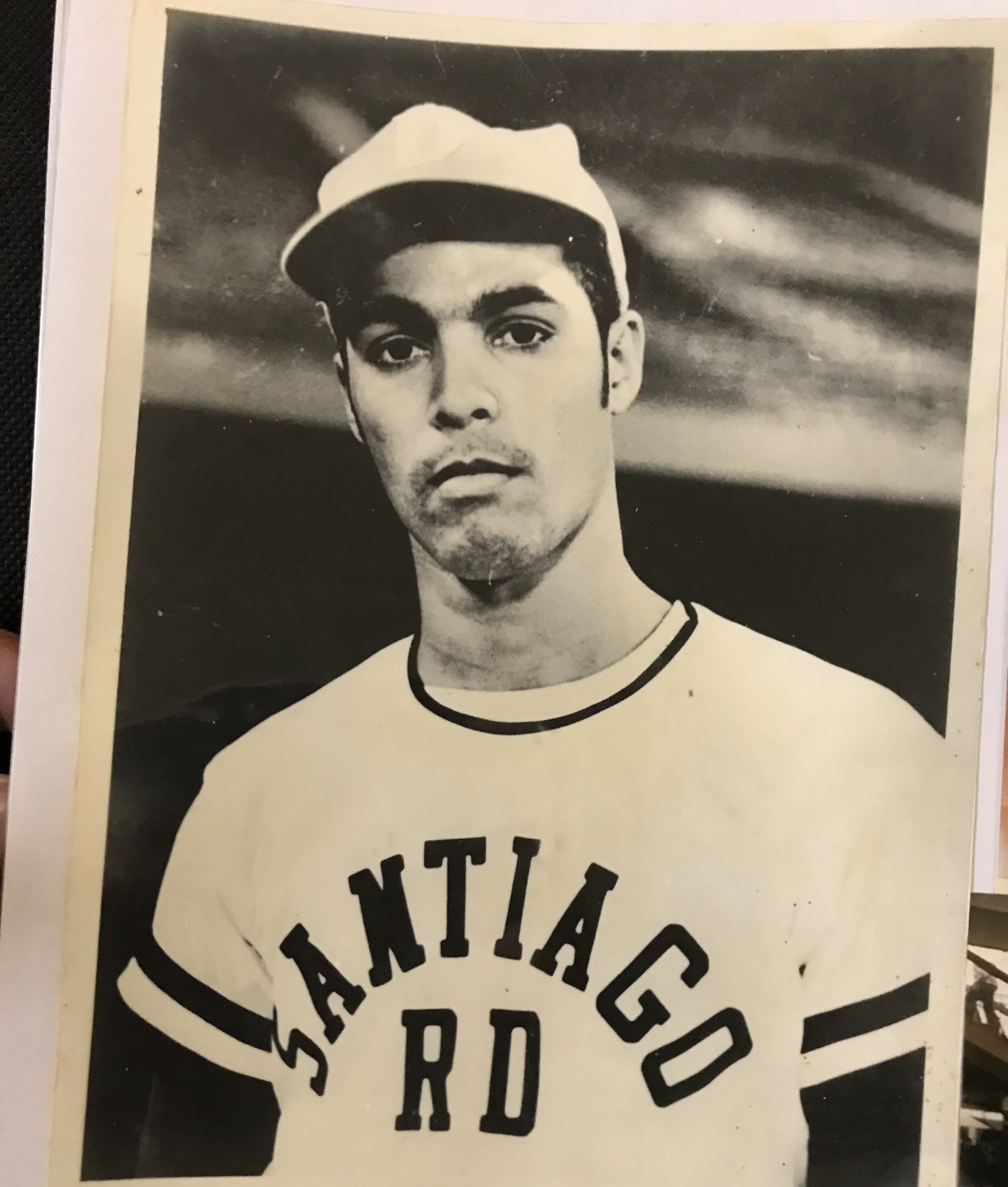
José Armando Castillo in the XXI World Games for Amateur Baseball in Havana, Cuba

== Career in Softball ==
In 1977, José Armando participated in the first tournament of Renacimiento Internacional del Sóftbol Molinete (Renaissance Fastpitch Softball Tournament), celebrated in the Dominican Republic, with the local teams Manicero, Toshiba, and Casino, a team from Puerto Rico and a team from Curaçao. Casino team where Castillo played was the winner of the tournament.

El Mago was pitcher for the National Fastpitch Softball Team of the Dominican Republic, participating in:

- The Central American and Caribbean Games celebrated in Medellin, Colombia (1978);
- The World Softball Tournament celebrated in Ponce, Puerto Rico (1979), were the Dominican Republic classified for the first time;
- The Men's Softball World Championship of Tacoma / Seattle, United States (1980); and in
- The Central American and Caribbean Games of Softball of Ponce, Puerto Rico (1980).

Continuing as a pitcher of the national team, he participated as well in the following international games, representing a vital role in the sports of the Dominican Republic as the country obtained its first medals in softball:

- Softball Champions of the Caribbean, in Maracay, Venezuela (1981);
- Central American Games of Softball, Maracaibo, Venezuela (1981), obtaining bronze medal, the first medal won by the Dominican Republic in Fastpitch Softball in a Central American Game;
- Central American and Caribbean Games, in Cuba (1982), where he obtained bronze medal and was selected as the Best Pitcher of the all-star team,
- Central American and Caribbean, Medellin / Cartagena, Colombia (1983), obtaining gold medal. As a consequence of these games, José Armando Castillo was selected as a trainer for the Men and Women National Teams of Colombia, toward the Pan American Games the same year.

His successful role as a softball pitcher of the Dominican National Team continued:

- In 1983 he was selected as Best Pitcher within the Pan American Games, in Medellin, Colombia.
- In 1985 he participated in the World Championship of Softball, in Michigan, United States. He participated as well as a reinforcement player in the friendly games of the Champions of the Caribbean Games, for the Dominican teams Toshiba, in Puerto Rico, and Manicero, in Panama.

During the Central American and Caribbean Games "Santiago ´86", celebrated in Santiago, Dominican Republic, José Armando Castillo had the honours of both pronouncing the Oath for the Games, and being the flag bearer of the Dominican delegation. He was also the pitcher who won the final match to attain the gold medal for the Dominican Republic. He was selected as the Most Outstanding Athlete of the Dominican delegation, by the then President of the Olympic Committee, Dr. José Joaquín Puello.

- In 1987 El Mago continued with his success as pitcher of the national softball team, winning gold medal, undefeated, in the Central American and Caribbean Games of Mexico City, Mexico. During the same year, the softball selection of Santiago represented Dominican Republic in the Champions Games, in Valencia, Venezuela, winning gold medal.
- In 1987 he participated in the Pan American Games of Indianapolis, United States; and,
- In 1989 he participated in the Pan American Games of Parana, Argentina.

El Mago participated as well in many other friendly international tournaments in Colombia, United States, Venezuela, Cuba and Dominican Republic.

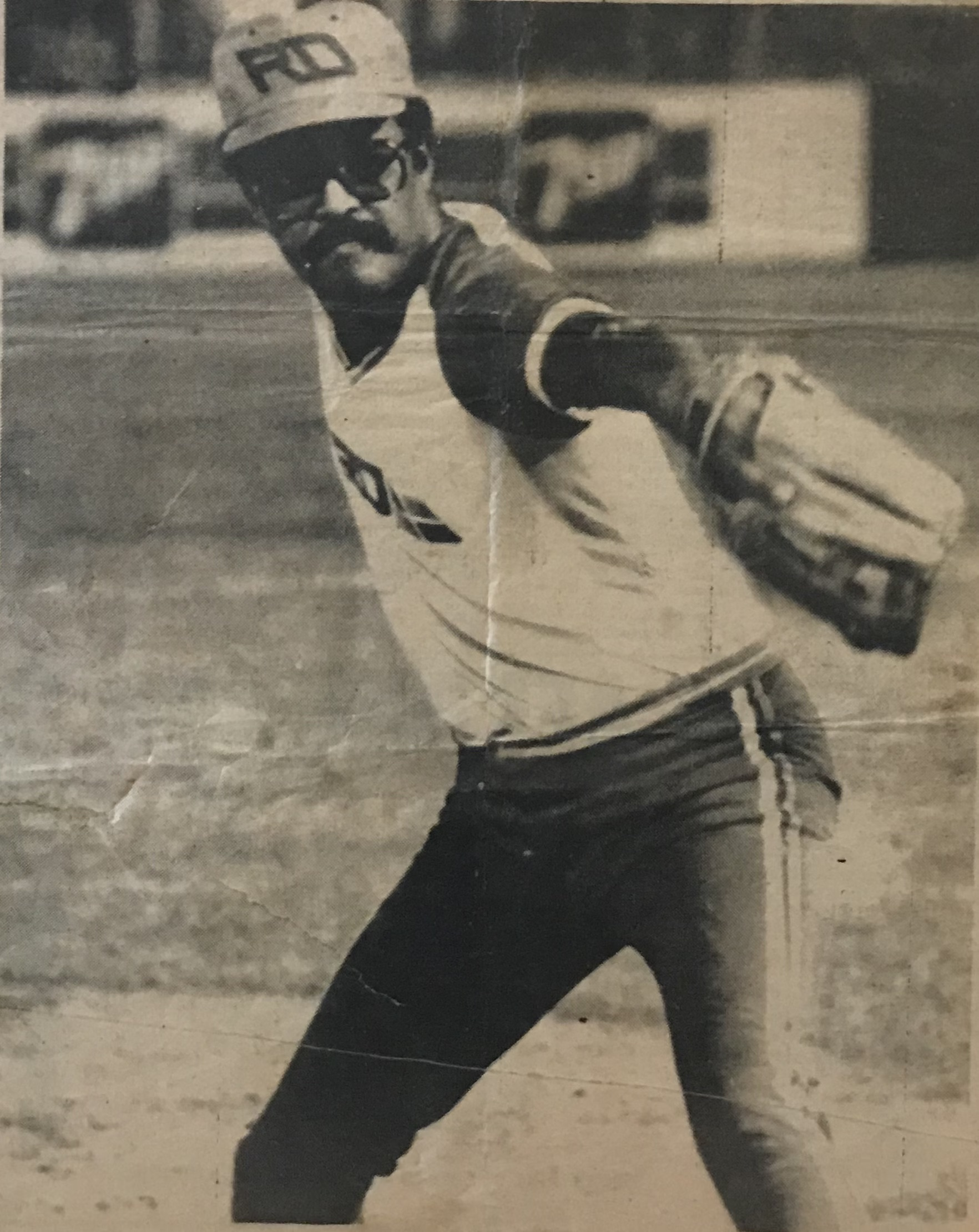
José Armando Castillo pitching at the Central American and Caribbean Games Santiago ´86

== Softball trainer ==
Castillo was Official Trainer of the National Softball Team from mid 1980´ to 2012, appointed by the Dominican Softball Federation and the Sports Ministry. In this position he covered several districts and provinces such as San Francisco de Macorís, Moca, La Vega, Puerto Plata, Bonao and Santo Domingo, among other.

In the 2000s he volunteered for about 5 years, together with the also renowned Dominican softball players, Arturo Fermín and Luis Vargas, for a free-of-charge softball training school in Santiago, with an offer covering also free training in San José de las Matas, Conuco (Moca), and Mao, among other.

He was a trainer of the Men´s and Women´s Softball National Teams of Colombia in 1983, for about two months, to prepare the teams for the upcoming Pan American Games that year. The Colombian Men´s Team actually managed to beat the Dominican Team in such games.

In addition, he was a trainer of the softball leagues of the prestigious Centro Espanol Inc. club of Santiago de los Caballeros, from 2011 to 2016.

== About "El Mago" (The magician) nickname ==
Although the nickname "El Mago" might be expected to be related to José Armando´s exceptional mastery of pitching, the source of this nickname is rather a popular Dominican belief were a person whose father dies before the person is born has the capability of curing mouth sores in kids, by just blowing some air from his mouth toward the wounds.

Given that José Armando´s father died before he was born, and given that the infants were cured after he, as a courtesy, politely blew some air on their wounds, he has always been nicknamed El Mago. José Armando himself has noted that although he is not personally superstitious, there has always been kids brought to him to be "cured" with such "spell".

== Personal life ==
The son of Ana Quisqueya Castillo and native of Villa González, José Armando worked firstly as a mechanic for the Compañía Anónima Tabacalera (tobacco industry) in Santiago de los Caballeros, from 1970 to 1999, and as a supervisor of marketing for sports events from 1990. Therefore José Armando Castillo had to alternate his passion for sports with a full-time job.

El Mago has three grown children: José Vladimir, with Milagros Méndez; and Scarlett María and José Armando from his marriage with the former banker Daisy Agramonte. He currently lives in North Carolina, United States, and is married with the also outstanding Dominican-American softball player, Damaris Santos.

== Discussion ==
José Armando Castillo was inducted into the Hall of Fame of the Dominican Sport (Pabellón de la Fama del Deporte Dominicano) in November, 2024. His career is exceptional, having been softball pitcher of the Dominican National Team that earned the first gold and bronze medals (including undefeated gold in Mexico) in Central American and Caribbean Games for the country; and also having dedicated more than 40 years to the development of both softball and baseball for future generations through trainings and representations all around the country and abroad. https://www.pabellondelafama.do/la-clase-2024-del-pabellon-de-la-fama-termina-de-tallar-su-obra-al-ser-exaltados-a-la-inmortalidad-deportiva/

== Honours and awards ==
- The number 19, which was his jersey number in the Dominican National Softball Team, was "retired" in his honour.
- He was a member of the Dominican National Softball Team from 1978 until 1991.
- He was selected as the most outstanding athlete in 1982, 1983, 1985 y 1986, by the Dominican Softball Federation and by the Dominican Olympic Committee.
- He was selected as the most outstanding athlete in 1979, 1980, 1985, 1986, y 1991 by the Sports Press Association of Santiago, Dominican Republic.
- He has been selected as the Softball Player of the Century in the Dominican Republic as well as added to the Corridor of Athletes of Merit of Santiago by the Sports Press Association of Santiago de los Caballeros, Dominican Republic.
- In 2016, José Armando was inducted to the Hall of Fame of the Sports of Santiago, by the permanent induction committee of the Sports of Santiago, Dominican Republic.
