= Greater Antilles =

Group of Caribbean islands

Coordinates: 21°59′N 79°02′W

Greater Antilles Antillas Mayores (Spanish) Grandes Antilles (French) Gran Zantiy (Haitian Creole)
- Subregion of the Caribbean
- Location within the Caribbean (red shading)

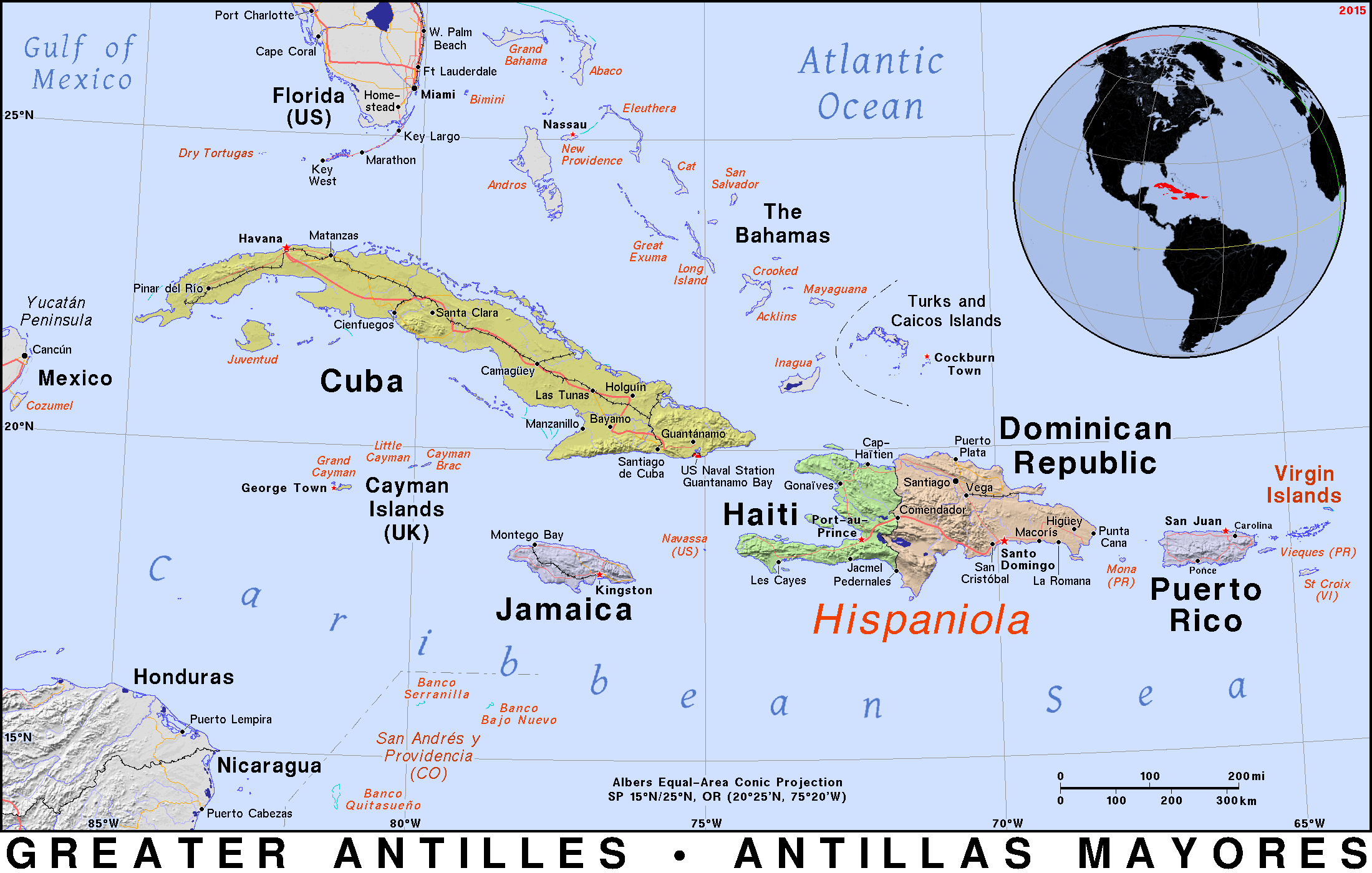
- Map of the Greater Antilles
- Island states: 7: Cayman Islands; Cuba; Dominican Republic; Haiti; Jamaica; Puerto Rico; Navassa Island
- Largest city: Havana
- Largest metro area: Greater Santo Domingo

Area
  - Total: 207,411 km^{2} (80,082 sq mi)

Population (2014)
  - Total: 38,400,500
  - Density: 171.45/km^{2} (444.1/sq mi)
- Demonym: Greater Antillean
- Time zones: UTC−05:00 (EST)
  - Summer (DST): UTC−04:00 (EDT)
- UTC−04:00 (AST)
  - Summer (DST): UTC−03:00 (ADT)

The Greater Antilles is a grouping of the larger islands in the Caribbean Sea, including Cuba, Hispaniola, Puerto Rico, and Jamaica, together with Navassa Island and the Cayman Islands. Seven island states share the region of the Greater Antilles, with Haiti and the Dominican Republic sharing the island of Hispaniola. Together with the Lesser Antilles, they make up the Antilles, which along with the Lucayan Archipelago form the West Indies in the Caribbean region of the Americas.

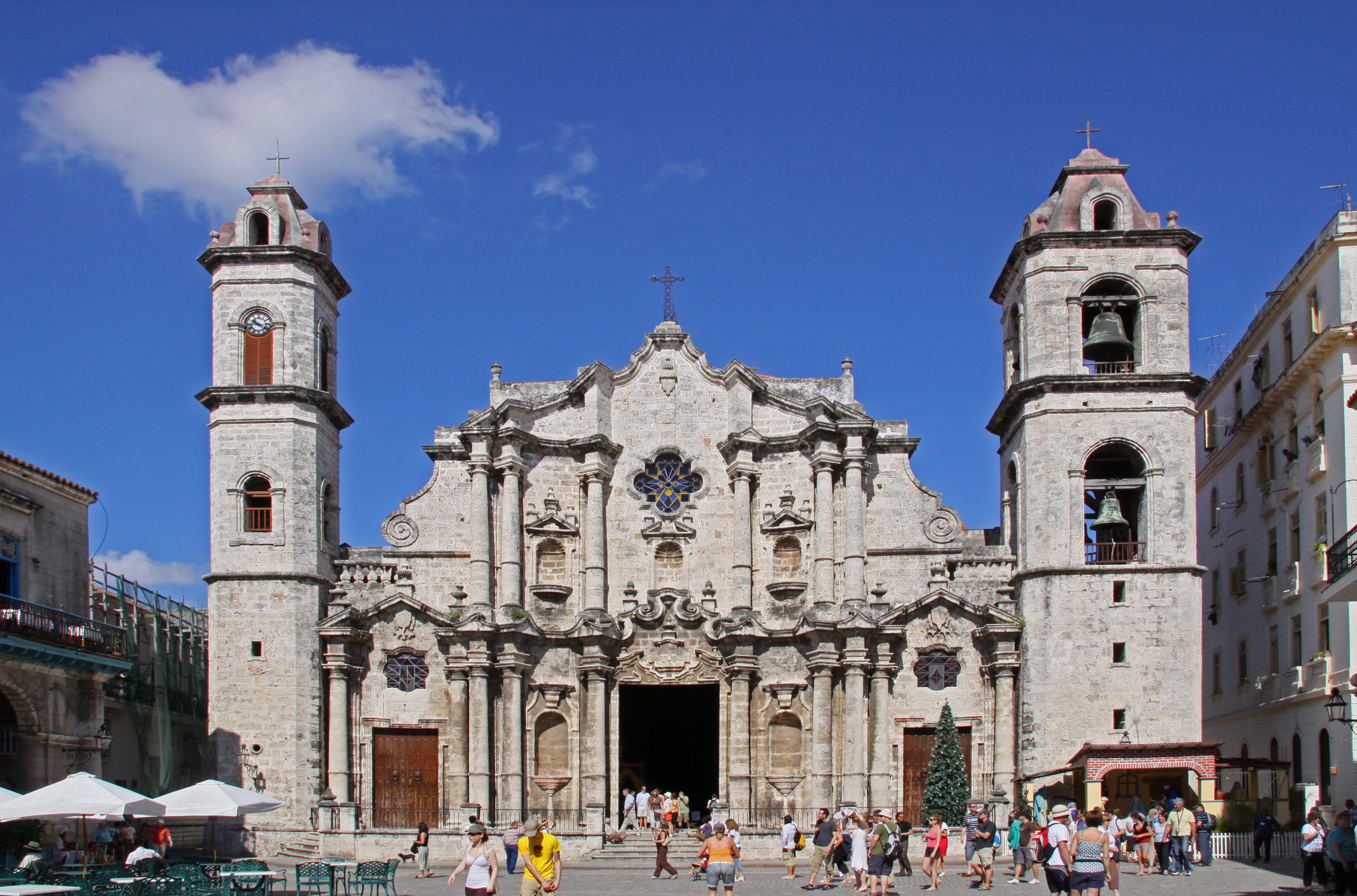
Havana Cathedral, built by the Spanish in Cuba between 1748 and 1777

While most of the Greater Antilles consists of independent countries, Puerto Rico and Navassa Island are unincorporated territories of the United States, while the Cayman Islands are a British Overseas Territory. The largest island is Cuba, which extends to the western end of the island group. Puerto Rico lies on the eastern end, and the island of Hispaniola, the most populated island, is located in the middle. Jamaica lies to the south of Cuba, while the Cayman Islands are located to the southwest. The state of Florida is the closest point in the U.S. mainland to the Greater Antilles, while the Florida Keys, though not part of the Greater Antilles, is an island group north of Cuba.

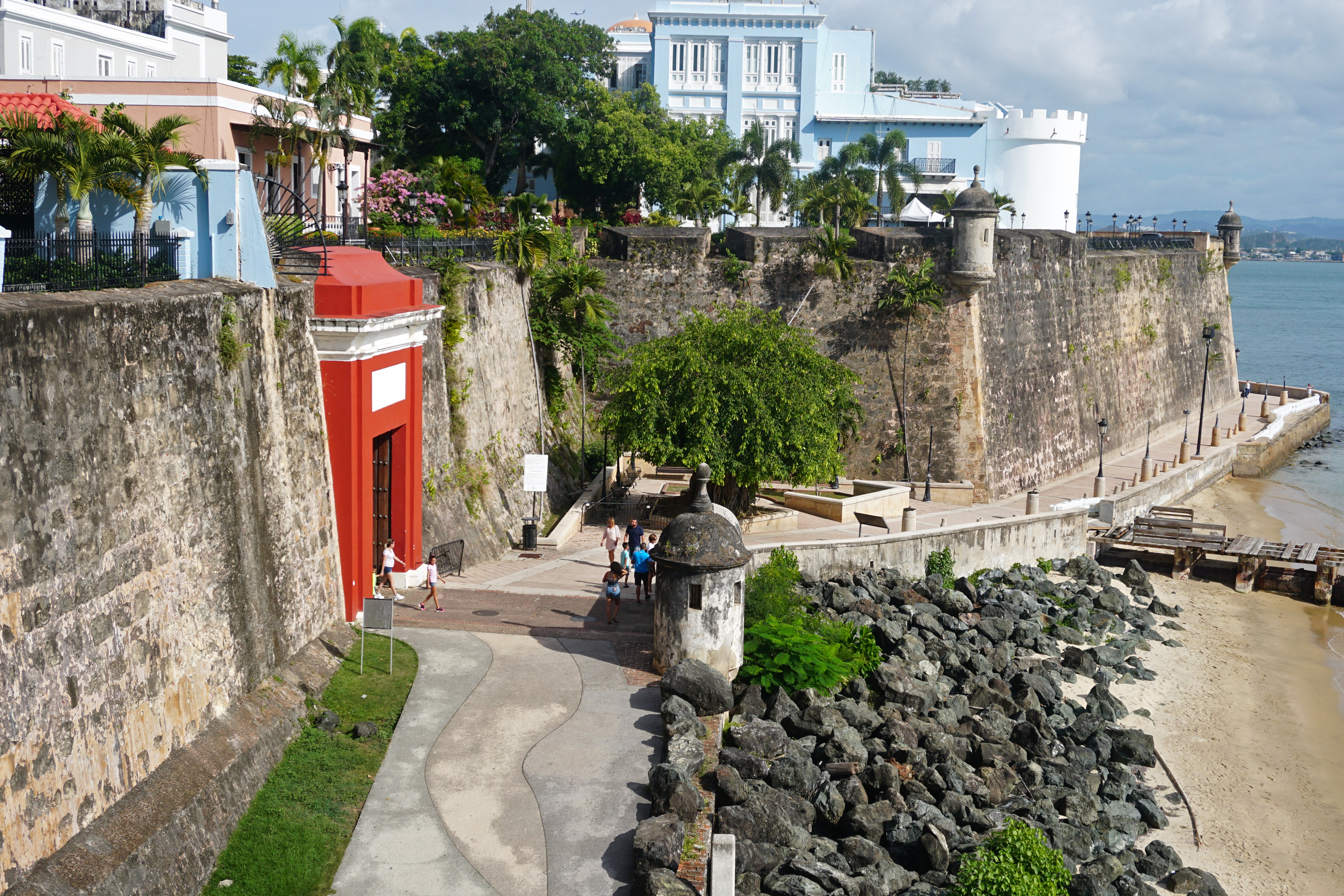
Puerto Rico's historic district, Old San Juan, contains 16th-century architecture, including the Fort San Felipe del Morro, the Fort San Cristóbal, the City Wall of San Juan, and La Fortaleza.

== Etymology ==
The word Antilles originated in the period before the European conquest of the New World. Europeans used the term Antillia as one of the mysterious lands featured on medieval charts, sometimes as an archipelago, sometimes as continuous land of greater or lesser extent, its location fluctuating mid-ocean between the Canary Islands and Eurasia.

== History ==
The first European contact with the Greater Antilles came from Christopher Columbus' first voyage to the Americas, as he sailed south from the Bahamas, exploring the northeast coast of Cuba and northern coast of Hispaniola. The Spanish began to create permanent settlements on Cuba and Hispaniola. The Atlantic slave trade brought many Africans to the islands. France began to exert influence over Haiti from 1625, dividing Hispaniola into two halves. Neighbouring Jamaica was invaded by the British, defeating the Spanish colonists.

At the beginning of the 16th century, the Spanish began to colonize the island of Puerto Rico. Despite the Laws of Burgos of 1512 and other decrees protecting Indigenous populations, some Indigenous people were forced into an encomienda system of forced labor in the early years of colonization.

The Haitian Revolution was the first and only successful anti-slavery and anti-colonial insurrection by self-liberated slaves; it established the independent nation of Haiti from France in 1804, the first and oldest black-led republic in the Americas as well as in the New World, the first in the Greater Antilles, the Caribbean, and Latin America as a whole. Haiti was also the second oldest independent nation in the Western Hemisphere after the United States.

The next nation to achieve independence, the Dominican Republic, was also on Hispaniola, declaring independence from Spain in 1821. It was quickly absorbed by Haiti under the unification of Hispaniola. The Dominican Republic gained independence from Haitian rule in 1844 after the Dominican War of Independence. The rest of the Greater Antilles would remain under colonial rule for another hundred years.

Along with the Philippines in Asia, Spain transferred possession of Cuba and Puerto Rico to the United States as a result of its loss in the Spanish-American War in 1898, coinciding with the Cuban War of Independence. This was the final loss of Spain's territorial possessions in the Americas. U.S. military rule over the island lasted until 1902, when Cuba was granted formal independence.

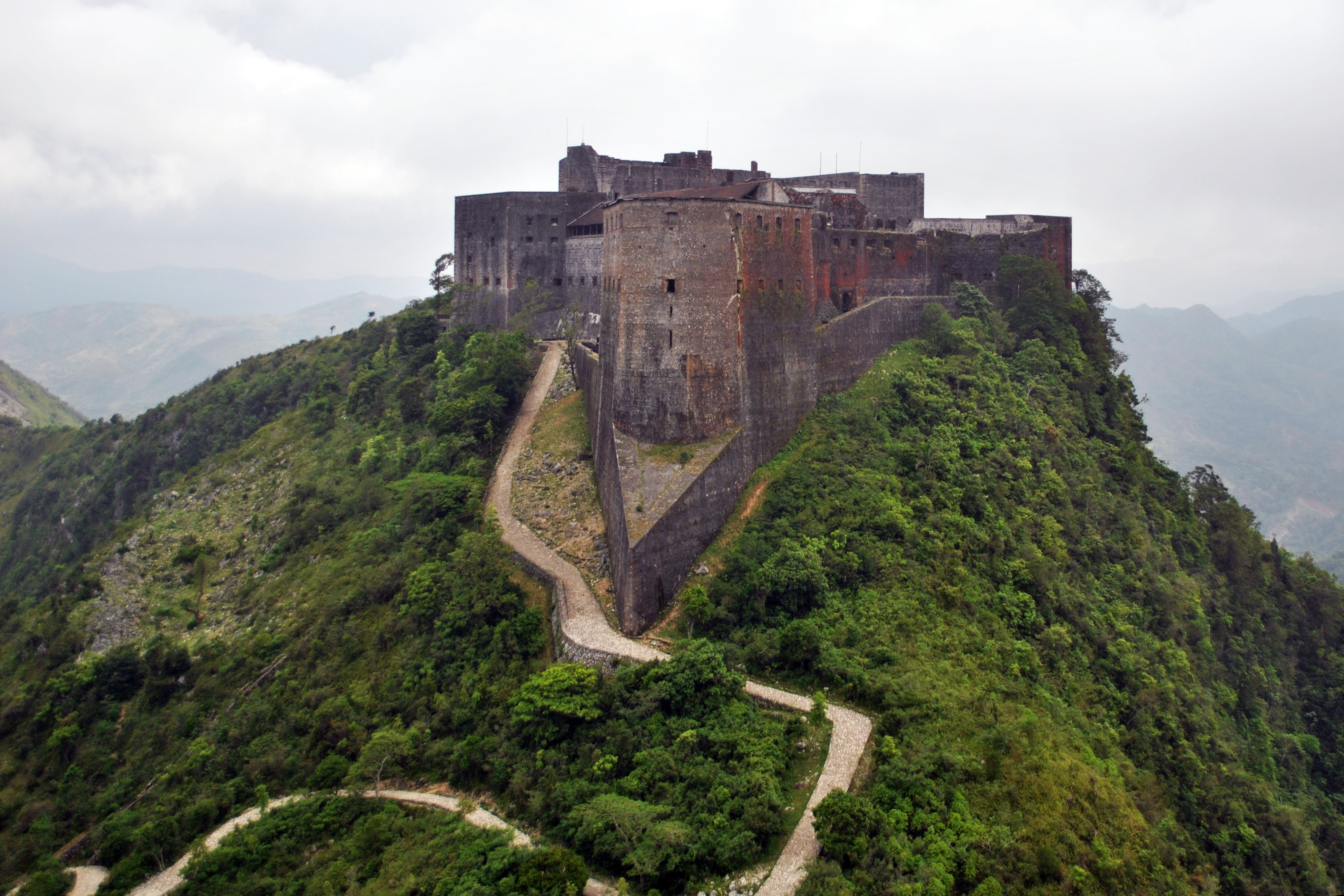
Citadelle Laferrière, 19th-century fortress in Haiti. It was built by freed slaves as a defence against France

In 1917, the U.S. Congress passed the Jones–Shafroth Act granting U.S. citizenship to Puerto Ricans born on or after April 25, 1898. In 1947, the U.S. Congress passed the Elective Governor Act, signed by President Harry S. Truman, allowing Puerto Ricans to vote for their own governor. The Cuban Revolution in 1959 established Cuba as the only communist state in the Greater Antilles. Jamaica was granted independence from the U.K in August 1962 becoming the last currently independent state in the Greater Antilles to achieve independence.

== Geography ==
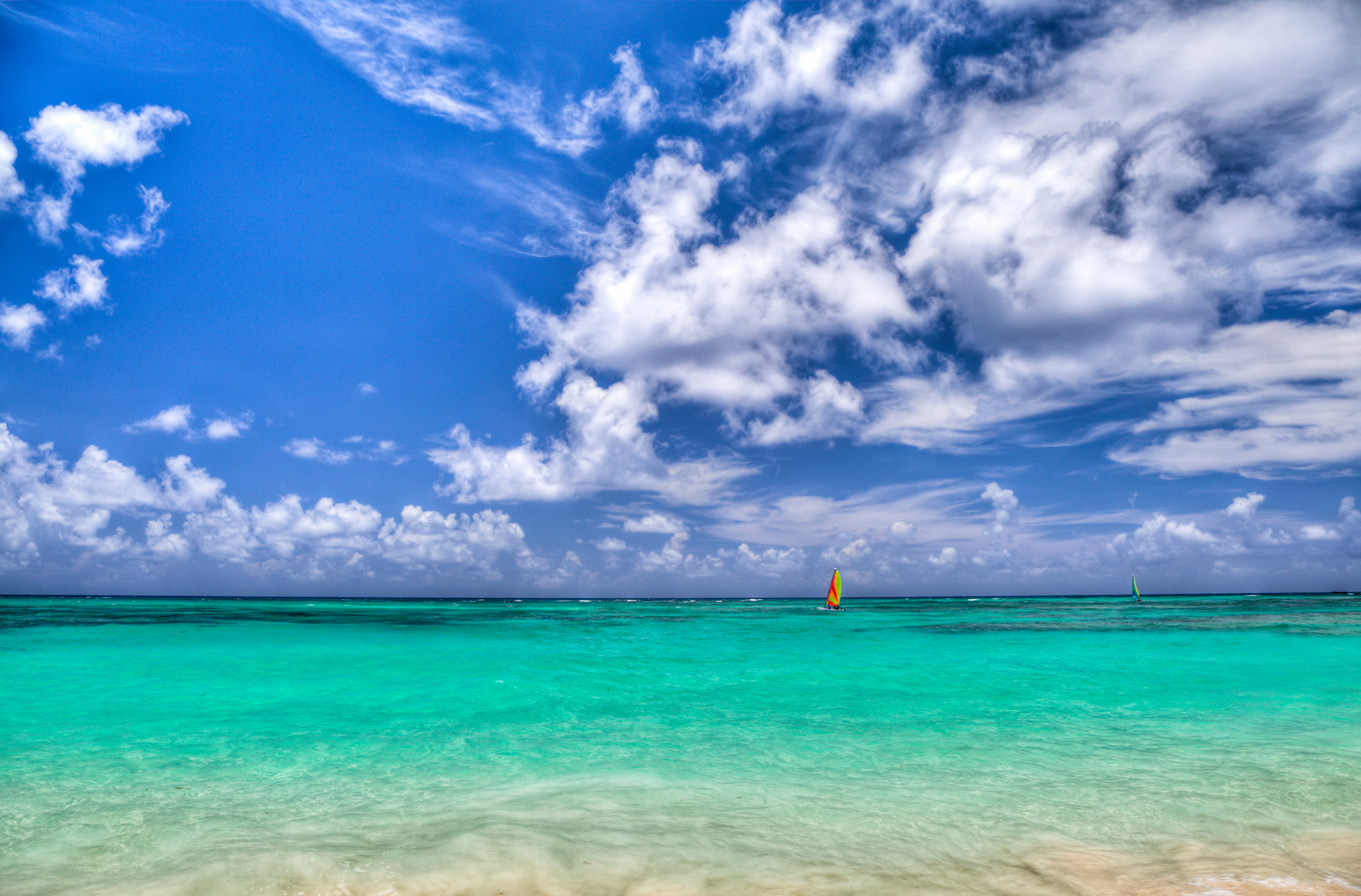
Punta Cana, Dominican Republic

The Greater Antilles comprises four major islands and numerous smaller ones. The island of Cuba is the largest island in the Greater Antilles, in Latin America, and in the Caribbean. It is followed by Hispaniola. Geologically, the Virgin Islands are also part of the Greater Antilles, though politically they are considered part of the Lesser Antilles. With an area of 207,411 square kilometres (80,082 sq mi), not counting the Virgin Islands, the Greater Antilles constitute nearly 90% of the land mass of the entire West Indies, as well as over 90% of its population.

The remainder of the land in the West Indies belongs to the archipelago of the Lesser Antilles, which is a chain of islands to the east, running north–south and encompassing the eastern edge of the Caribbean Sea where it meets the Atlantic Ocean, as well as to the south, running east–west off the northern coast of South America. The Lucayan Archipelago is not considered part of the Antilles archipelagos but rather of the North Atlantic.

The islands exist because of the relative motion of the Caribbean plate and surrounding plates. Obduction has scraped accumulated rock onto the North American plate, islands and intrusions have been formed by volcanism, and the local crust has become deformed in other ways.

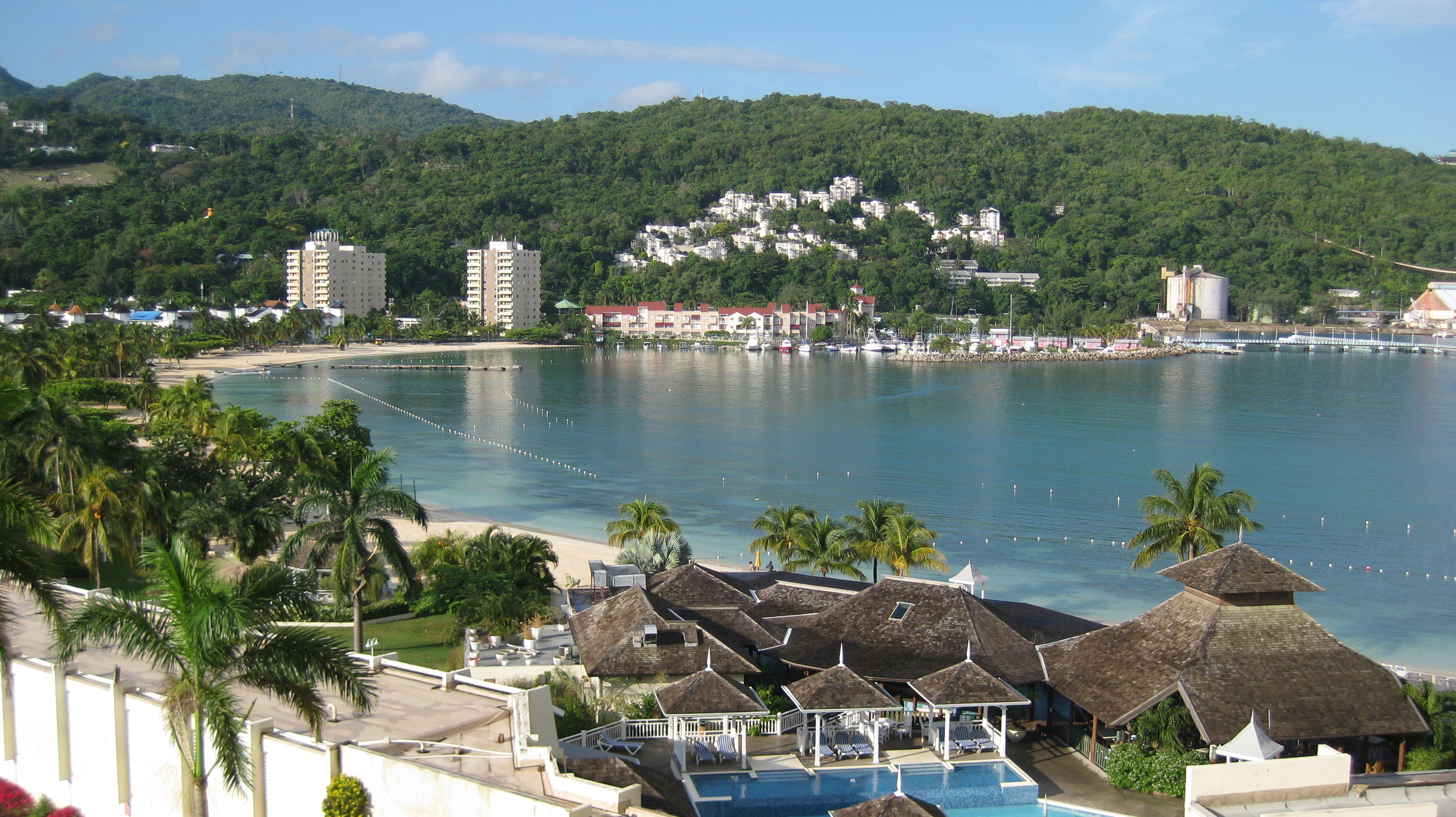
Ocho Rios, Jamaica

== Demographics ==
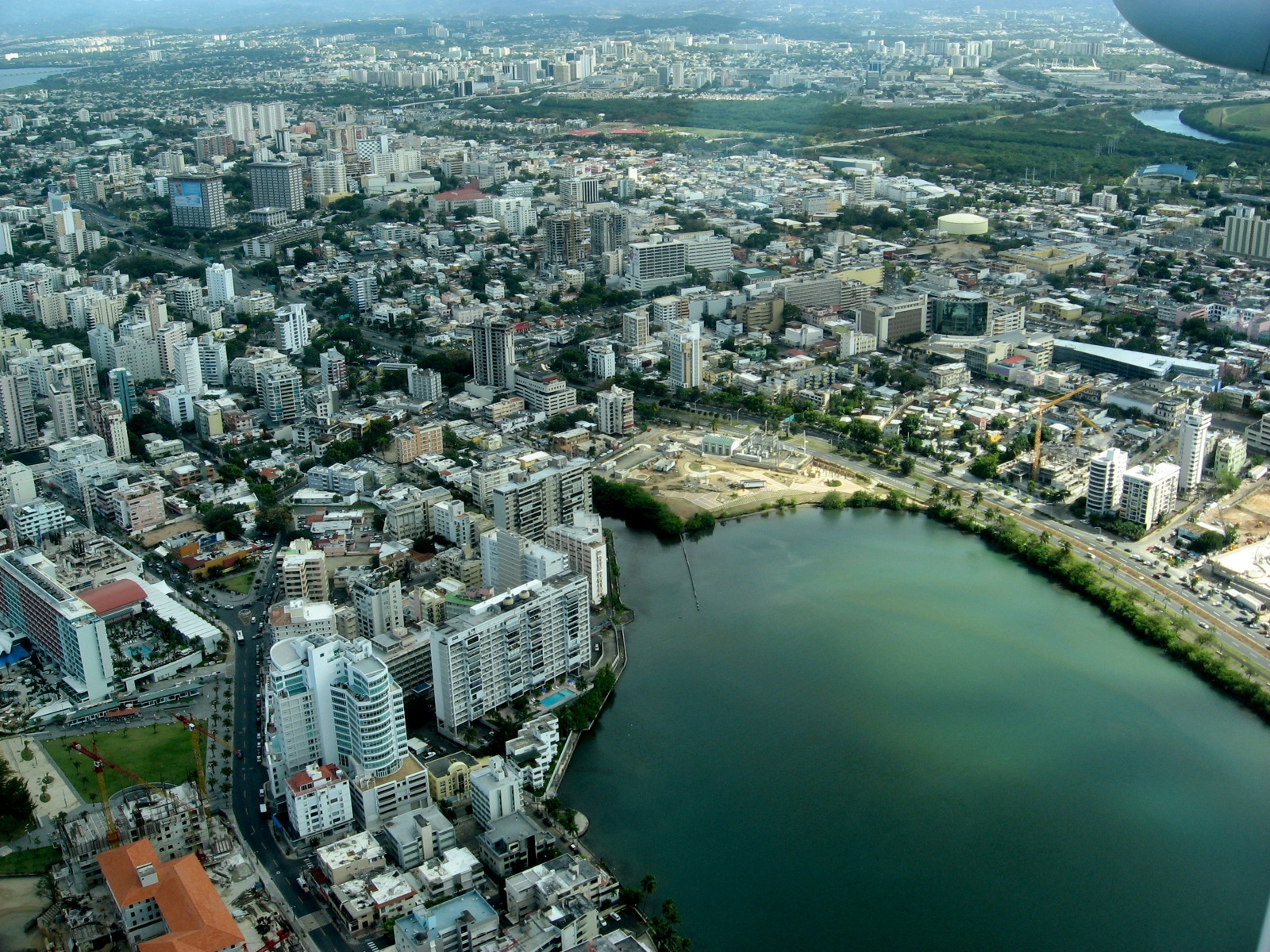
Santurce, the most populated district, or barrio, in Puerto Rico's capital, San Juan.

The Greater Antilles is considered part of Latin America. With a population of 38 million, it makes up 6% of Latin America's population. The capital of the Dominican Republic, Santo Domingo, with a population of over 2 million, is the largest city in the Greater Antilles. Other large cities include Havana, Port-au-Prince, Kingston and San Juan.

In 2018, the quality of life was similar in Cuba, the Dominican Republic and Jamaica, whose Human Development Index (HDI) categorized them as "high human development". Puerto Rico and the Cayman Islands are categorized as "very high". Haiti had the lowest HDI in the Greater Antilles and in all of the Americas, categorized as "Low human development".

== Languages ==
The languages are mostly colonial languages, along with some Creole influence. Spanish is the main language in Cuba, the Dominican Republic and Puerto Rico. Haiti has a Creole language, Haitian Creole, as one of its official languages, alongside French. English is the main language in Jamaica and the Cayman Islands, though it is also an official language of Puerto Rico, where it is spoken as a second language. In Jamaica, a Creole language is spoken but carries no official recognition.

== List of countries and dependencies ==
Name	Area (km^{2})	Population (2017)	Population density (per km^{2})	Capital	Official language
Cayman Islands (UK)	264	58,441	207.9	George Town	English
Cuba	110,860	11,147,407	102.4	Havana	Spanish
Dominican Republic	48,442	10,734,247	183.7	Santo Domingo	Spanish
Haiti	27,750	10,646,714	292.7	Port-au-Prince	Haitian Creole, French
Jamaica	10,991	2,990,561	248.6	Kingston	English
Puerto Rico (US)	9,104	3,351,827	430.2	San Juan	Spanish, English
Total	207,411	38,929,197	169.05		

== See also ==
- Lesser Antilles
- Antilles
