= Cámboya =

- Location within the Dominican Republic
- Coordinates: 19°27′N 70°42′W
- Country: Dominican Republic
- Municipalities: Santiago de los Caballeros
- Province: Santiago

Government
  - Mayor: José Enrique Sued

Area
  - Total: 19.44 km^{2} (7.51 sq mi)

Population (2008)
  - Total: 86,489
  - Density: 982.1/km^{2} (2,544/sq mi)
- Time zone: UTC-4:00
- Website: Portal del ciudadano

Cambóya is a sector in the city of Santiago de los Caballeros in the province of Santiago of the Dominican Republic.

== Sources ==
- Portal del ciudadano
