= Punal =

Punal may refer to:

- Punal Nadu, one of the minor Tamil kingdoms
- Puñal
