= Villa González =

Villa González, Dominican Republic
- Villa González in the Dominican Republic
- Coordinates: 19°31′48″N 70°46′48″W
- Country: Dominican Republic
- Province: Santiago
- Townhood: 20 January 1915
- Cityhood: 1991

Area
  - Total: 101.50 km^{2} (39.19 sq mi)

Population (2012)
  - Total: 72,365
  - Density: 712.96/km^{2} (1,846.5/sq mi)
- Municipal Districts: 2

Villa González is a municipality (municipio) of the Santiago province in the Dominican Republic. Within the municipality there are two municipal districts (distritos municipal): El Limón and Palmar Arriba.

== Geography ==
The town is located 20 miles (32 km) from Santiago de los Caballeros.

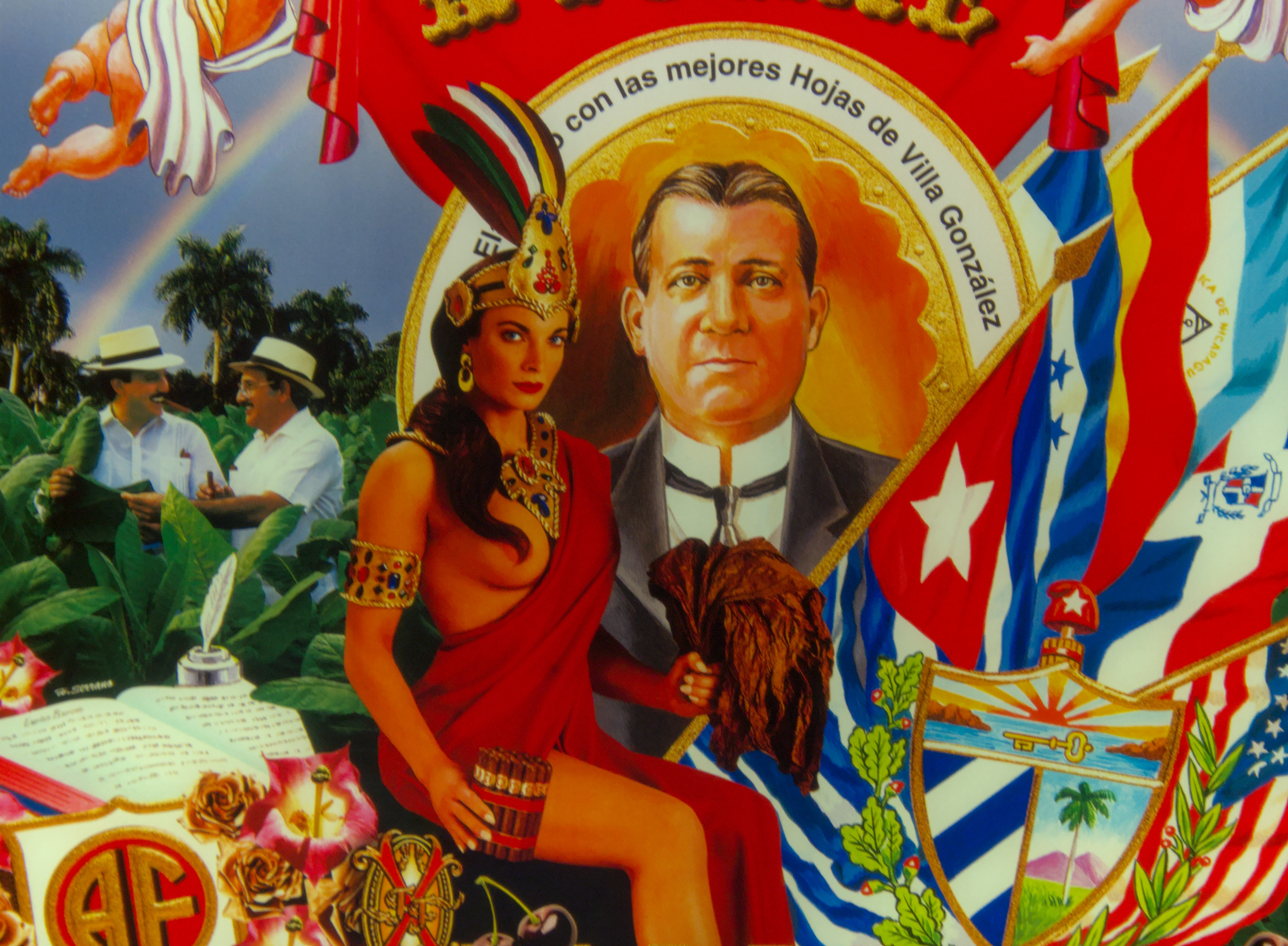
Mural in La Placita del Mercado, Santurce, San Juan, Puerto Rico featuring the trademark of Villa Gonzalez Santiago

== Notable residents ==
- José Armando Castillo, baseball and fastpitch softball player for Dominican national teams
- Ramón del Monte, professional baseball player
- Raynel Espinal, professional baseball player
- Asela Mera de Jorge, politician and activist
- Ramón Morel, professional baseball player
- Reyes Moronta, professional baseball player
- José Reyes, professional baseball player
- Antonio Santos, professional baseball player
