= Licey al Medio =

- Licey al Medio in the Dominican Republic
- Coordinates: 19°25′48″N 70°37′12″W
- Country: Dominican Republic
- Province: Santiago

Area
  - Total: 32.02 km^{2} (12.36 sq mi)

Population (2012)
  - Total: 69,321
  - Density: 2,165/km^{2} (5,607/sq mi)
- Municipal Districts: 1

Licey al Medio is a municipality (municipio) of the Santiago province in the Dominican Republic. Within the municipality there is one municipal district (distrito municipal): Las Palomas. The Cibao International Airport is located here.

== Economy ==
The main economic activities of Licey al Medio are the swine and poultry production, as well as a robust metalworking industry. Licey holds economic exchange links with Tamboril, Santiago, Moca and Santo Domingo, mainly for its production of chickens and eggs. Licey has an industrial park zone containing 7 companies, with approximately 275 employees in total.

== Notable people ==
- Eugenio de Jesús Marcano Fondeur, scientist and botanist
- Manuel de Jesús Peña y Reynoso, writer
- Orlando Alba, linguist
- Ydanis Rodriguez, Commissioner of the New York City Department of Transportation
