= Palmar Arriba =

- Location within the Dominican Republic
- Coordinates: 19°31′48″N 70°43′48″W
- Country: Dominican Republic
- Province: Santiago

Population (2008)
  - Total: 4,072

Palmar Arriba is a town in the Santiago province of the Dominican Republic.

== Sources ==
- – World-Gazetteer.com
