= Baitoa =

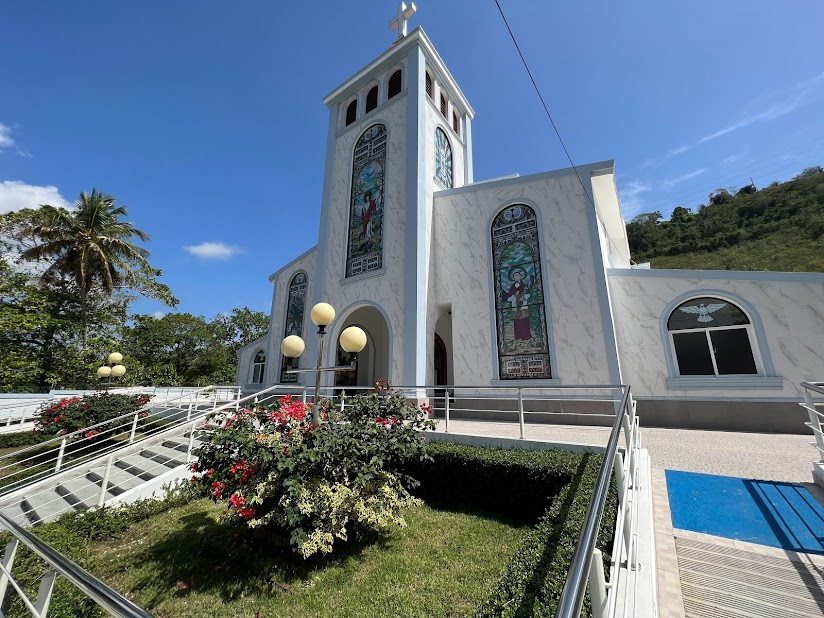
- View of Baitoa, Dominican Republic town church.

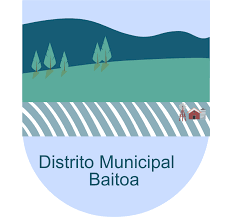
- Coat of arms

- Location within the Dominican Republic
- Coordinates: 19°19′12″N 70°42′0″W
- Country: Dominican Republic
- Province: Santiago
- Founded: circa 1765
- Established as a Municipality: June 1, 2020

Area
  - Total: 29.54 km^{2} (11.41 sq mi)
- Elevation: 250 m (820 ft)

Population (2014)
  - Total: 17,778
  - Density: 601.8/km^{2} (1,559/sq mi)
- Demonym: Baitoeros (-as)
- Time zone: UTC−4
- Postal code: 51000
- Website: ayuntamientobaitoa.gob.do

Baitoa is a town and municipality in the Santiago Province of the Dominican Republic. Santiago is part of the northern valley of the country, otherwise known as the Cibao. Baitoa is named after a native tree, also known as St. Domingo Boxwood. The population speaks a Cibao dialect of Dominican Spanish.

Baitoa is located near the Yaque del Norte River, the longest river in the Dominican Republic. It sits east of Sabana Iglesia, west of La Vega Province, north of La Presa de Taveras, and south of the city of Santiago de los Caballeros.

== History ==
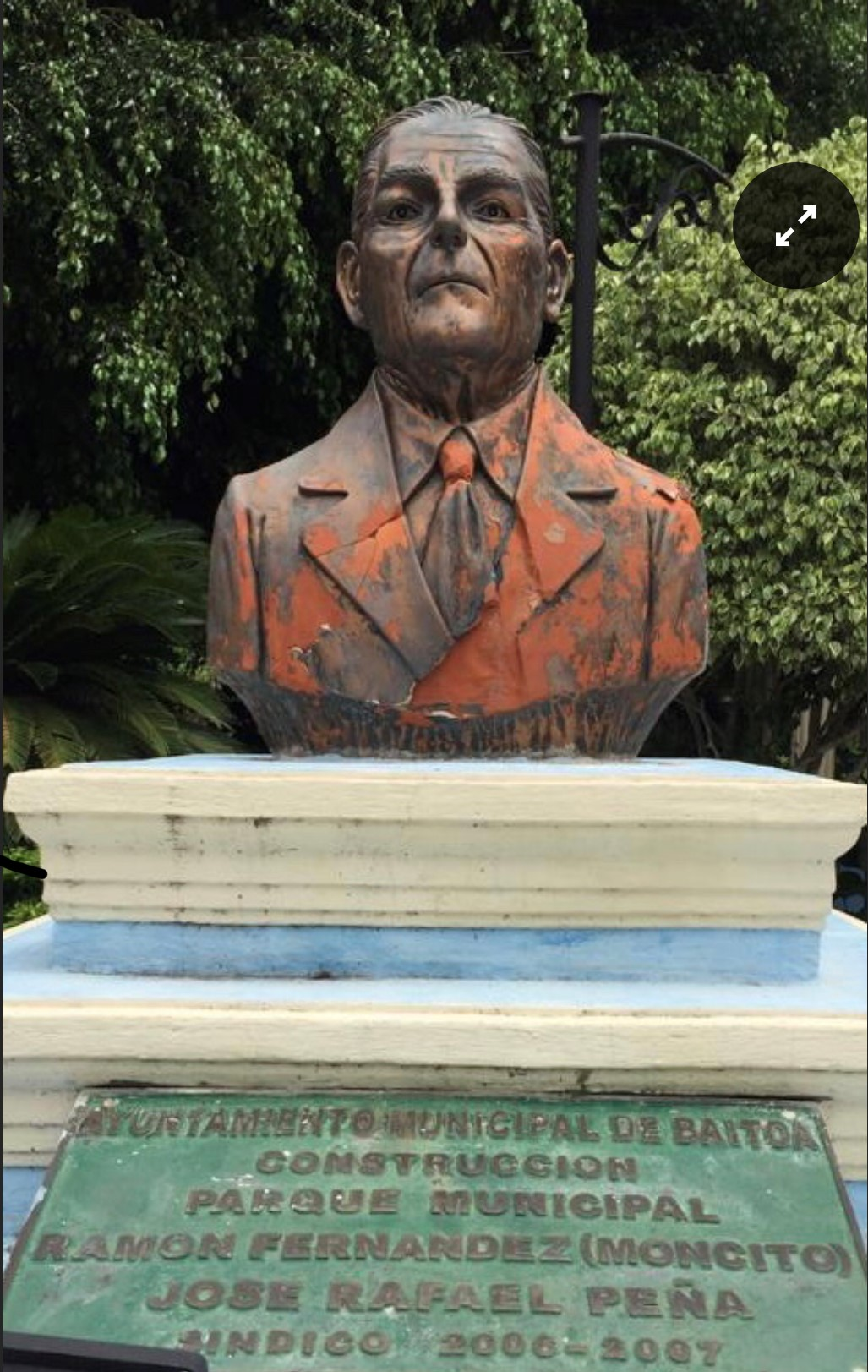
Memorial Statue of Jose Ramon Fernández at the Municipal Park of Baitoa

Baitoa was previously settled by indigenous peoples of the Caribbean known as Taínos for hundreds if not thousands of years prior to the arrival of Christopher Columbus in Hispaniola in 1492. At the time, the island was ruled by five Chiefdoms of Hispaniola, each of which was led by a cacique or a high chief. Baitoa was within the territorial bounds of the Chiefdom of Maguá, which was led by the cacique Guarionex. The early Spanish colonial history of Baitoa is largely unknown. There is no evidence to suggest that there were any permanent European settlements in this region during the early colonial period. However, the Spanish Conquistadors did establish a nearby fort and settlement in La Vega, Dominican Republic in 1494, in order to mine gold.

In 1779 the criollo Don Juan Reyes Terreros sold "Terreno Baytoa" to Don Francisco Espaillat y Virol (1734–1807), a Frenchman, for the operation of raising livestock for 215 pesos. In all likelihood, several criollo families arrived in Baitoa around the same time during the mid to late-18th century. However, due to the lack of historical records from this period, this may never be known. As a rancher, Francisco Espaillat likely engaged in the livestock trade. He was also involved in the lucrative tobacco industry. Throughout the 18th-19th centuries, farmers from the Cibao formed semi-autonomous agricultural economies, and became increasingly involved in growing and selling tobacco to the international market, especially to Hamburg, Germany. One of Francisco's sons, Dr. Santiago Espaillat, became President-elect of the Dominican Republic in 1849, while a grandson, Ulises Francisco Espaillat, later went on to become the 15th President of the Dominican Republic in 1876.

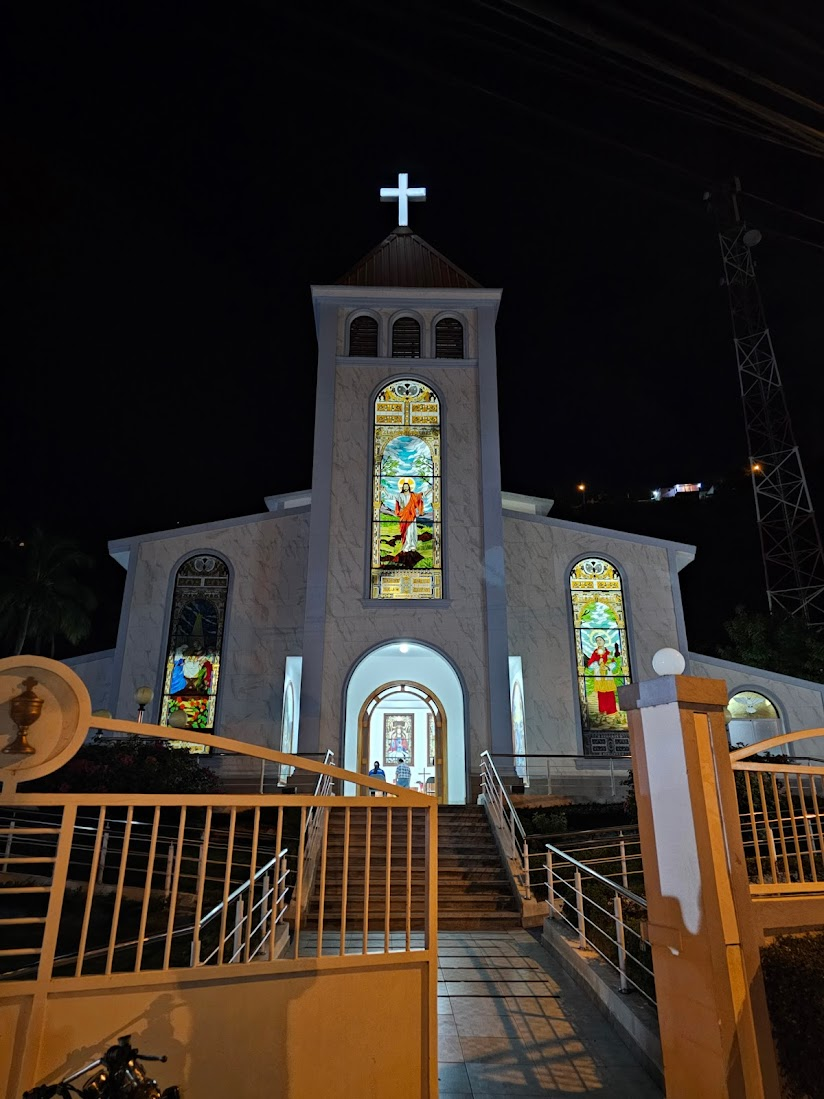

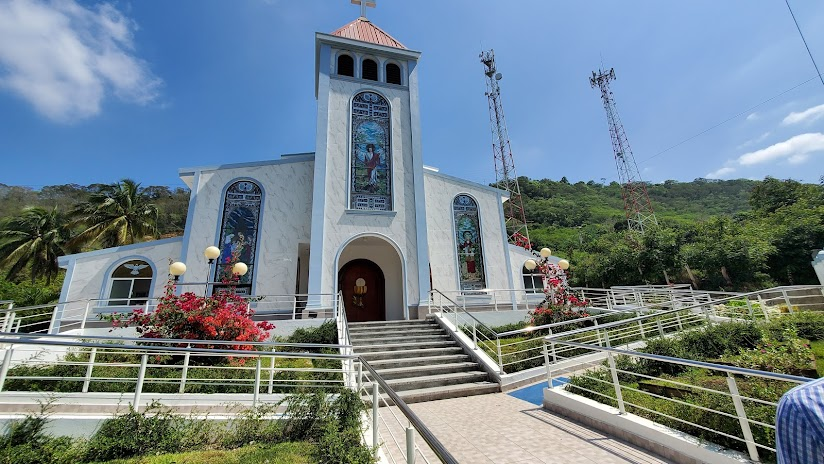

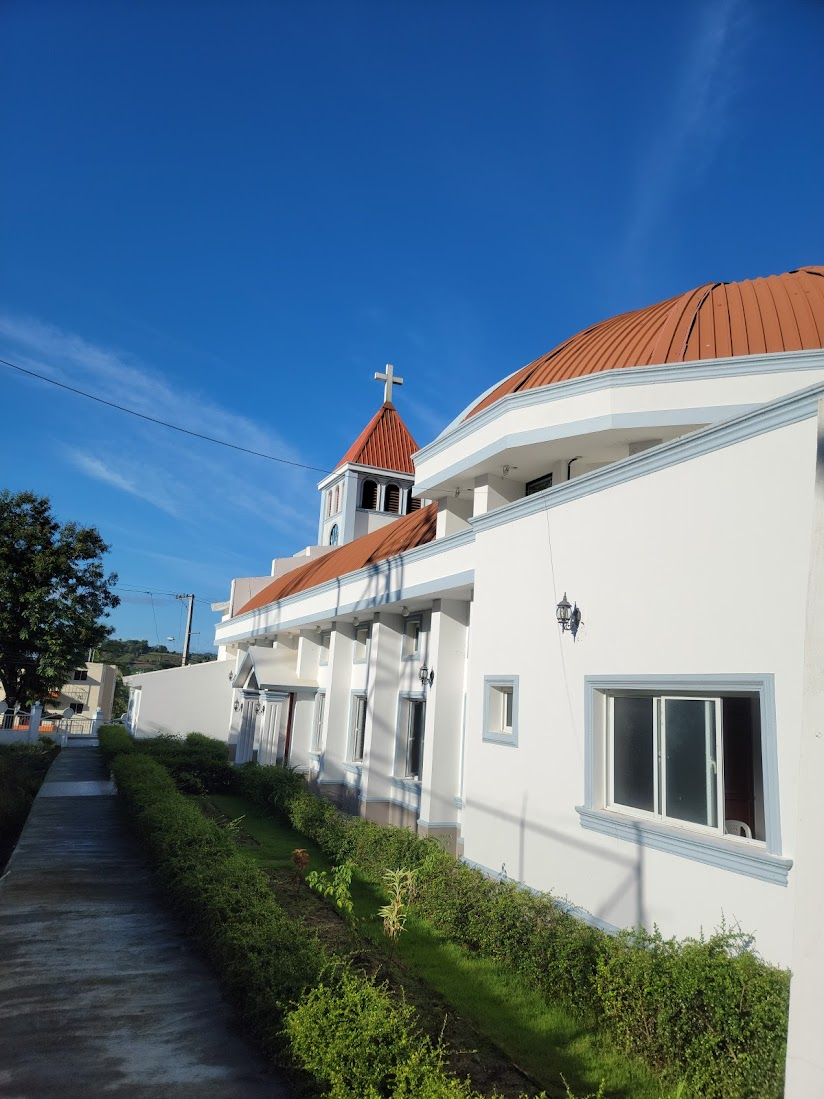

In the early-1800s, migration to Baitoa was probably stimulated by the Peace of Basel (1795), whereby Spain had ceded Santo Domingo to France, and by the Haitian Revolution (1791–1804), where thousands of Dominicans left the island or moved to rural communities in order to escape the reach of colonial powers and foreign rule. By the late-1800s, more families began migrating to Baitoa from other areas of the Dominican Republic, due to the growing agricultural economy and availability of land in the region. There are parish records that go as far back as 1863 in Santiago de los Caballeros, which affirms the presence of several growing and newly arriving families in Baitoa. For much of the 19th-20th century, Baitoa was scarcely populated, with no more than several thousand people, and with a small number of core families who continued to form bonds and marital relationships with members of the same community.

Several other natives of Baitoa were also connected to well-known figures in Dominican history. For instance, Leonor Emilia Valerio (1890–1983), was a granddaughter of Dominican General Fernando Valerio. Mrs. Valerio was also married to Jose Ramon "Moncito" Fernandez (1896–1956), who was one of the leading entrepreneurs in Baitoa. The Parque Municipal Ramon Fernandez (Municipal Park) was posthumously named after him.

By the 21st century, Baitoa had a population of over 17,000 people.

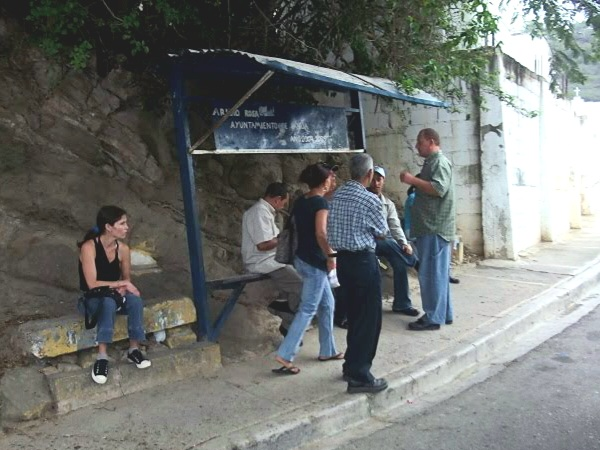

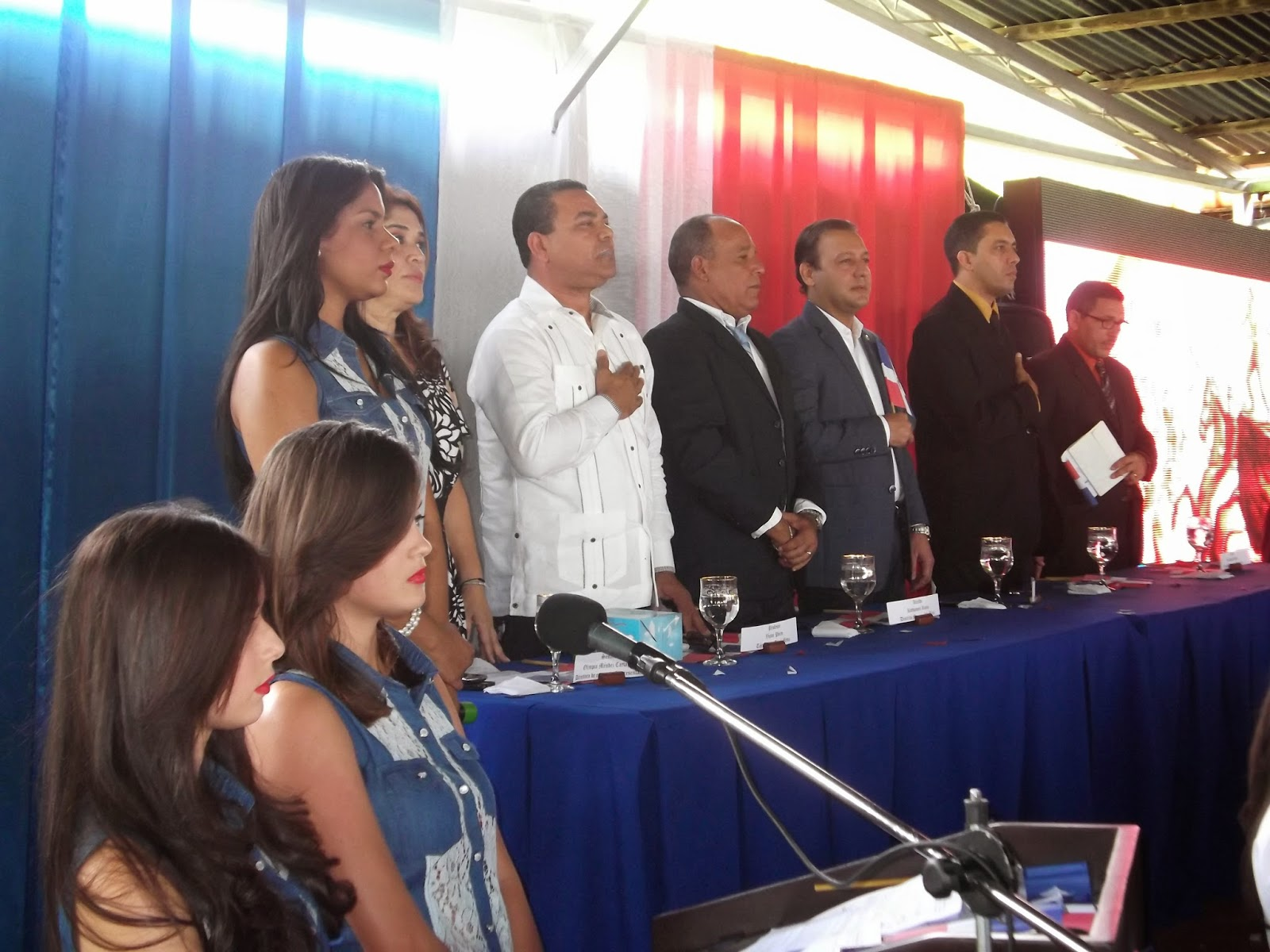

== Genealogy ==
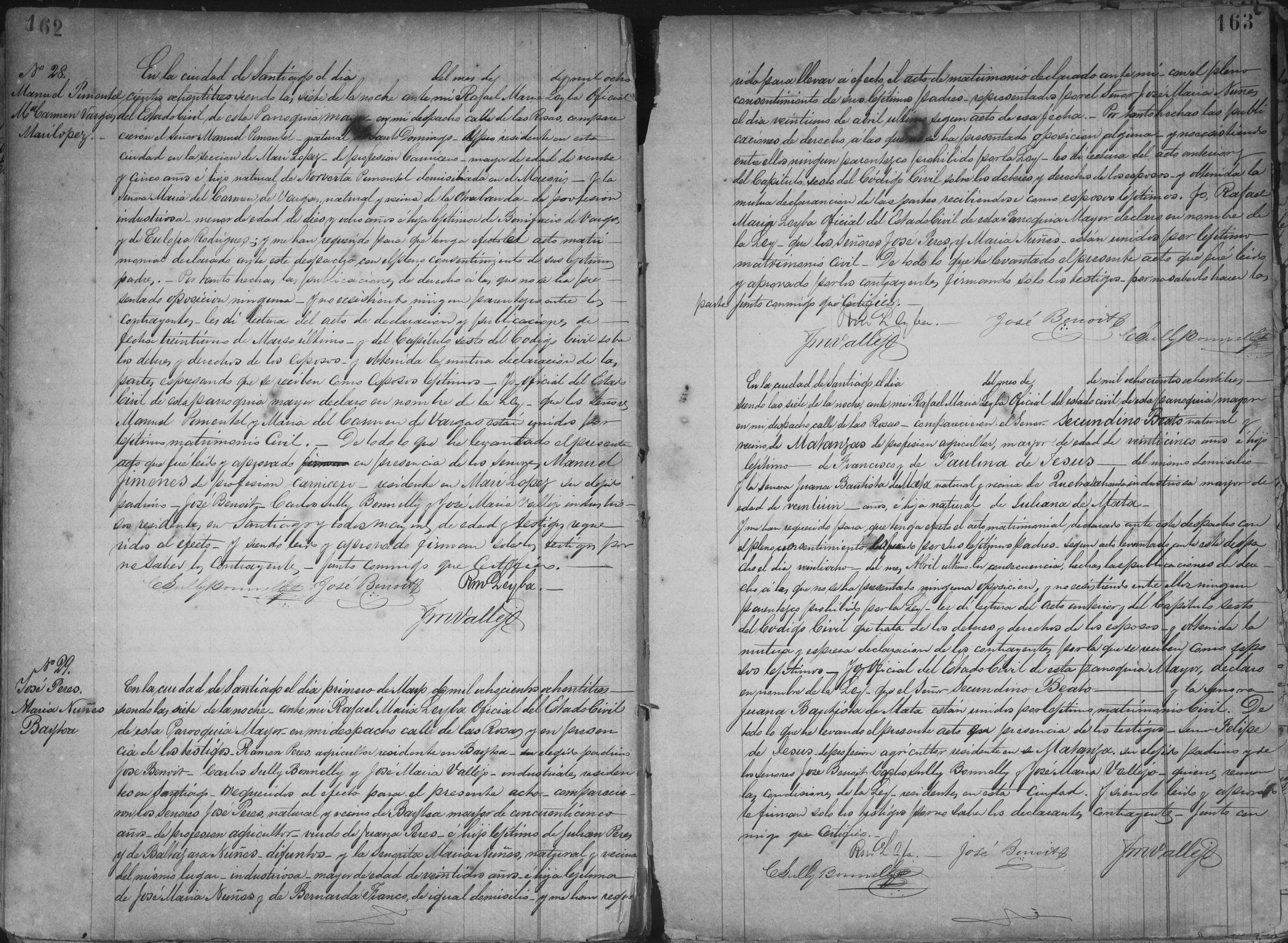
Civil Marriage of Jose "Pepe" Perez and Maria Adelaida Nunez, No. 29 (1883)

=== Traditional Genealogy ===
As per oral history, one of the "founding fathers" of Baitoa was Julian Perez (h. 1780-), the son of Manuel Perez. His mother's name is unknown. Julian Perez was married to Baltazara Núñez Fernández in the 1820s.

=== Genetic Genealogy ===
Similar to the multiethnic profiles of many other Dominicans, natives of Baitoa are mostly of European, Native American, and African DNA, based on genetic genealogical evidence, although their ethnic ancestral background is strongly dominated by Western European origins (Spanish, French, etc). There is a strong presence of White or European-descended Dominicans. This fits the general ancestral pattern in the Cibao valley region of the Dominican Republic, which is characterized by high percentages of Spanish ancestry and broader European ancestry, followed by Native American ancestry and then African ancestry. These observations are based on DNA testing results from the genealogical testing site, 23andMe.

== Education ==
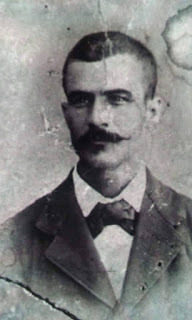
Gabriel Franco

In the late-19th century, the first public school of Baitoa, Liceo Prof. Gabriel Franco, was founded and named after Prof. Gabriel Franco Núñez (c. 1863–1943). The school is located near Carretera Santiago Baitoa, the main highway traversing the region. Franco was one of the first educators in the region of Baitoa.

== Health ==
The main hospital of Baitoa is Hospital Municipal Antonio Fernández, incorporated on September 28, 2012. This hospital is named after the father of former Dominican President, Leonel Fernández.

== Politics ==
In 1993, Baitoa, formerly a section of Santiago, was officially elevated to the rank of Municipal District. In 2014, Baitoa was elevated once again and recognized as a Municipality of Santiago. The Ayuntamiento Municipal de Baitoa, or The Mayor's Office, is located on calle África Núñez.

On June 28, 2017, the Mayor of Baitoa, Bernardo López, organized a protest in front of the national palace, demanding a clean water supply system for his constituents.

== Culture ==
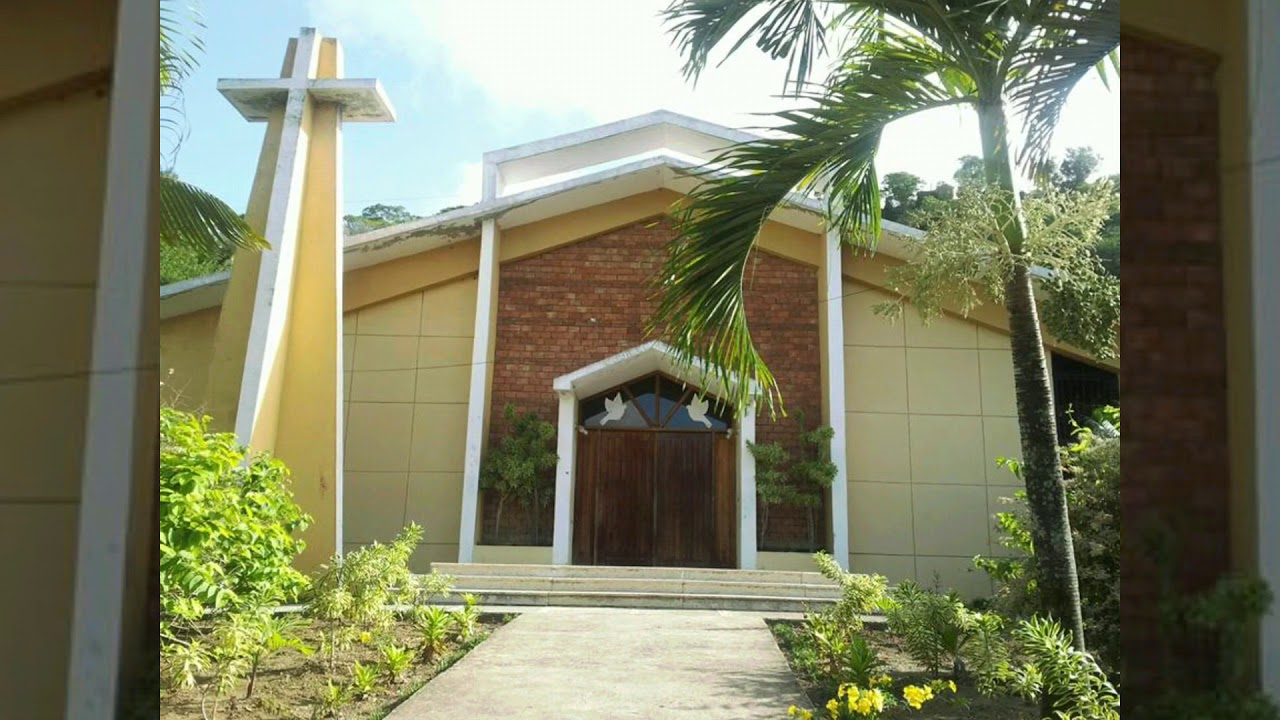
Iglesia San Ramon Nonato

The local population of Baitoa are predominantly Roman Catholic. One of the local churches is Iglesia San Ramon Nonato (Saint Ramon Catholic Church). The church is named after Raymond Nonnatus, the patron saint of Baitoa. The Catholic Church in Latin America plays a very important role in the culture and identity of Dominicans, especially natives of Baitoa, who come from traditional, rural families. Many local festivals and community activities revolve around church traditions and teachings. Prior to the opening of Iglesia San Ramon in the early 20th-century, people from Baitoa would often receive visits from parish priests from the Santiago Apostol Cathedral, located about 25 km away.

The people of Baitoa are known to celebrate El Día de los Burros (or Donkey Day), where all the cowboys in town ride in their horses, donkeys, and mules, within the community, as a well to celebrate their animals and country culture. This event is a local spin off the religious holiday, El Día de San Juan (or the Day of Saint John).

The most popular style of music in this region is merengue music, which is played with instruments like the accordion, güira and tambora. Baseball is the most popular sport in Baitoa and the Dominican Republic in general.

Some of the most well-known landmarks in this region include La Loma de Juana Núñez, La Presa de Taveras, El Callejón de los Sánchez, and the sports complex known as Centro Deportivo Sergio Perez, posthumously named after Sergio Antonio Perez (1949–1992).

== Notable people from Baitoa ==
Manny Pérez – actor, screenwriter

Diccia Pineda-Kirwan - New York State Supreme Court Justice, first woman Dominican born judge in New York

== Gallery ==
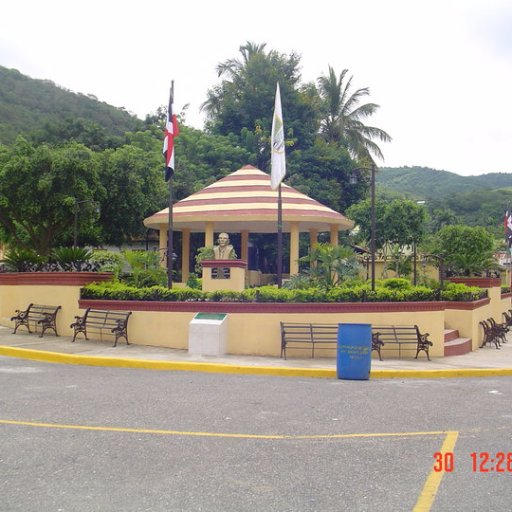

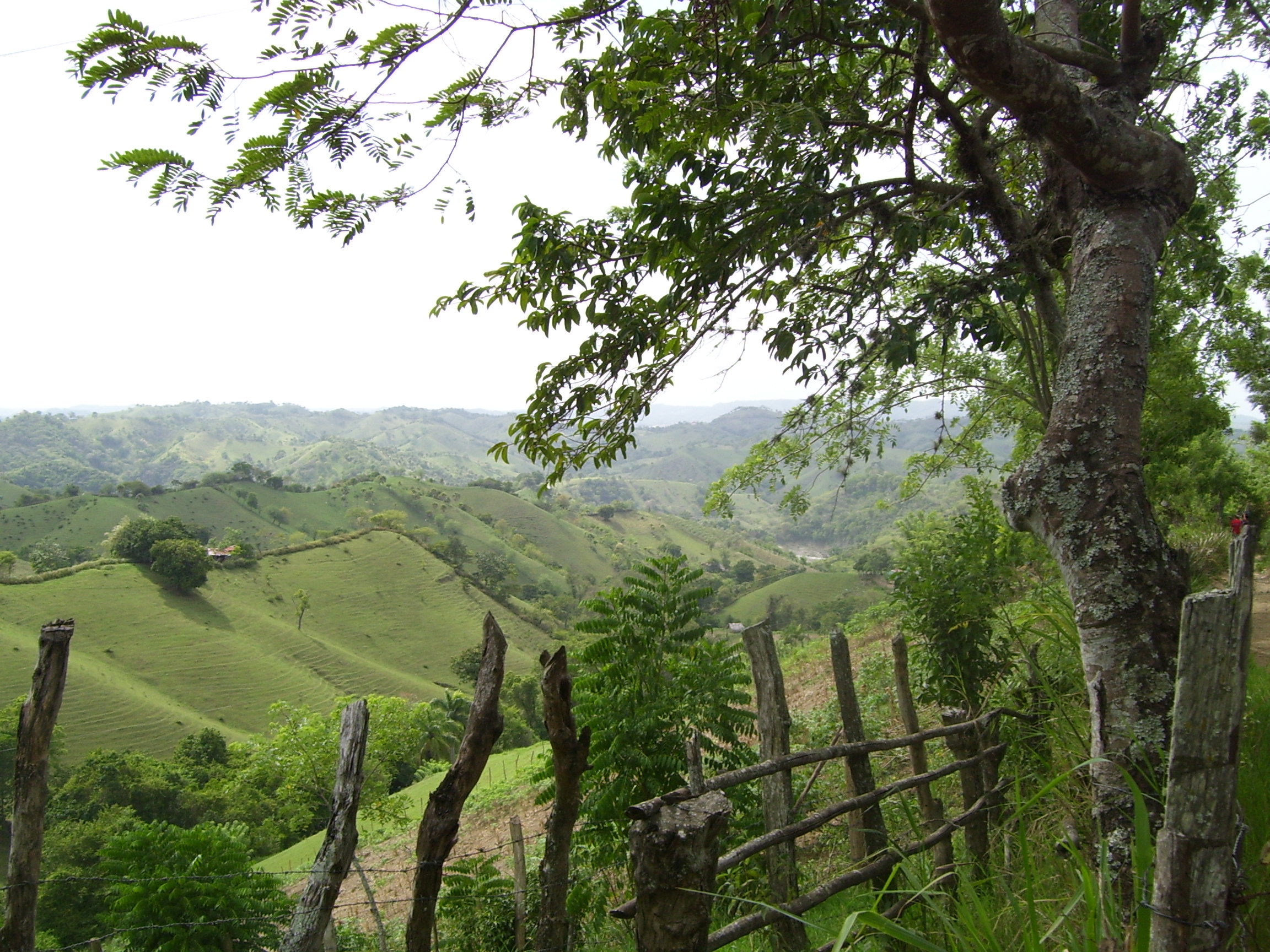

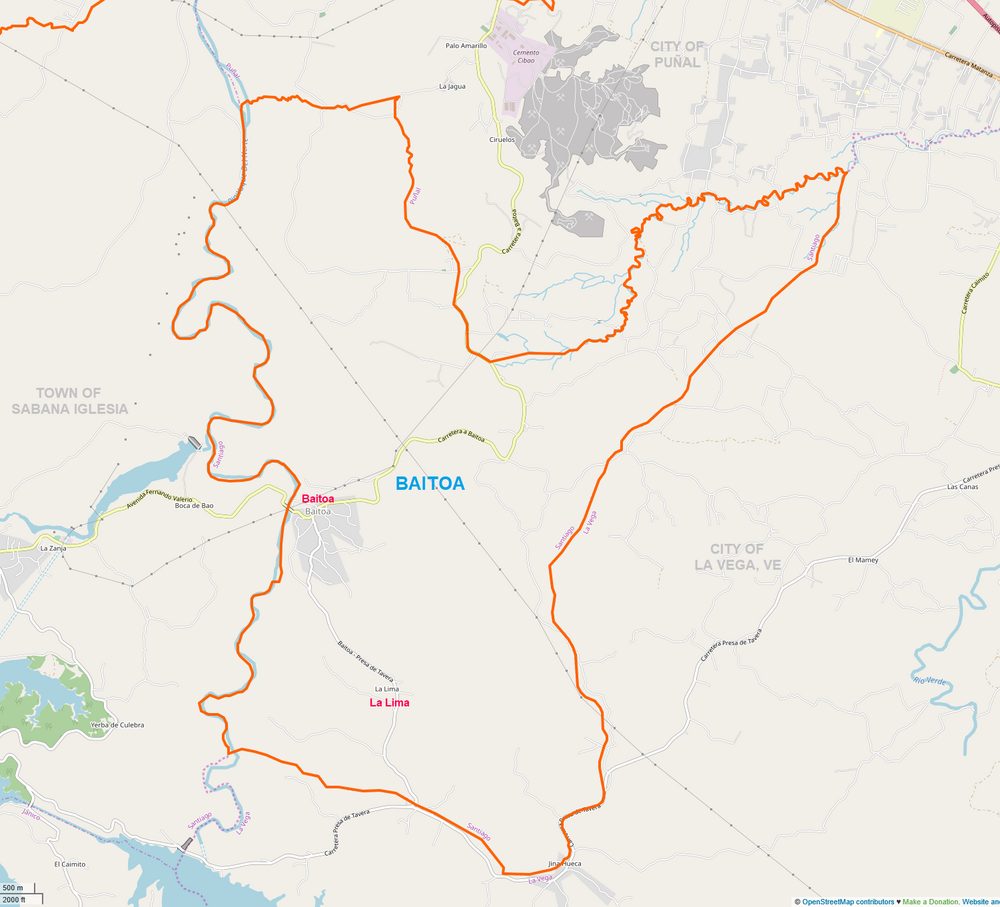
Map of Baitoa

== Sources ==
- – World-Gazetteer.com
