= Puñal =

Puñal San Antonio del Puñal
- Location within the Dominican Republic
- Coordinates: 19°24′0″N 70°37′0″W
- Country: Dominican Republic
- Province: Santiago de los Caballeros
- Founded: 2006

Area
  - Total: 89.12 km^{2} (34.41 sq mi)
- Elevation: 183 m (600 ft)

Population (2012)
  - Total: 69,303
  - Density: 777.6/km^{2} (2,014/sq mi)
- Time zone: Atlantic Standard Time
- Area codes: 809, 829, 849

Puñal is a city in Santiago Province. Puñal became a rural section of the municipality of Santiago de los Caballeros in 1937, comprising the spots: Guayabal, Matanzas and Laguna Prieta. In February 2006 the rural section of Puñal was raised to the category of municipality. Puñal comprises the municipal districts Guayabal, Canabacoa, Arenoso, La Javilla and Matanzas.

== Sources ==
- – World-Gazetteer.com
- http://www.fallingrain.com/world/DR/25/Punal_Adentro.html
- https://web.archive.org/web/20081026081842/http://www.wikidominicana.edu.do/wiki/Municipio_Pu%C3%B1al
