= Santiago Province (Dominican Republic) =

Province of the Dominican Republic

Santiago
- Province
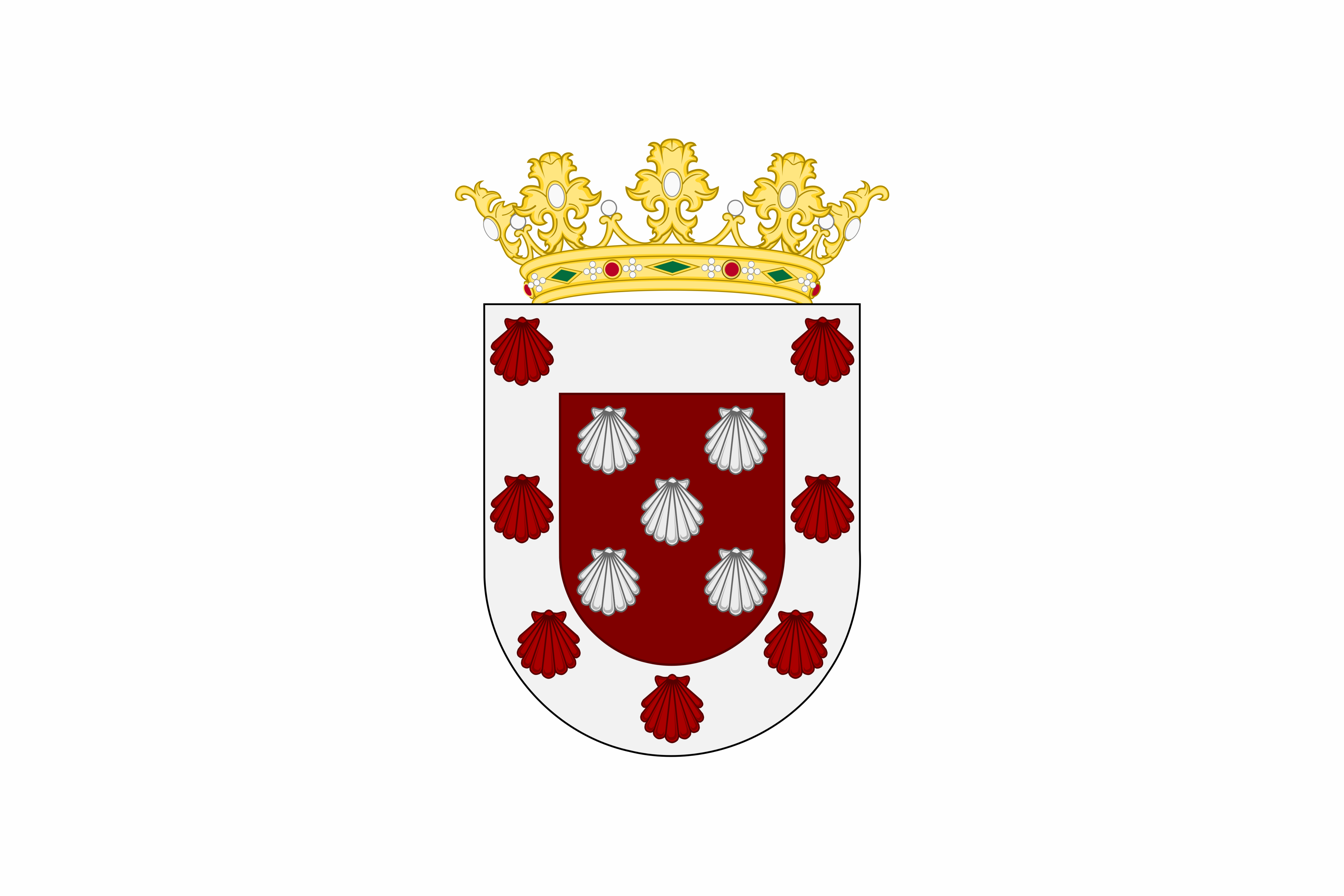
- Flag Coat of arms
- Nickname: Primer Santiago de América
- Motto: Ciudad Corazón
- Location of Santiago Province
- Coordinates: 19°21′24″N 70°54′32″W
- Country: Dominican Republic
- Region: Cibao
- Province since: 1844
- Capital: Santiago de los Caballeros

Government
  - Type: Subdivisions
  - Body: 10 municipalities 20 municipal districts
  - Congresspersons: 1 Senator; 18 Deputies

Area
  - Total: 2,806.29 km^{2} (1,083.51 sq mi)

Population (2022)
  - Total: 1,074,679
  - Density: 382.954/km^{2} (991.845/sq mi)
- Time zone: UTC-4 (AST)
- Area code: 1-809 1-829 1-849
- ISO 3166-2: DO-25
- Postal Code: 51000
- Website: www.provinciasantiago.gov.do/

Santiago (Spanish pronunciation: [sanˈtjaɣo]) is one of the 32 provinces of the Dominican Republic. It is divided into 10 municipalities and its capital city is Santiago de los Caballeros. Located in north-central Dominican Republic, in the Cibao region, it is bordered by the provinces of Valverde to the north-west, Puerto Plata to the north, Espaillat and La Vega to the east, San Juan to the south and Santiago Rodríguez to the west.

It is home to an intellectual, educational, and cultural center. It is also a major industrial center with rum, textile, cigarette and cigar industries based there. Shoe manufacturing, leather goods, and furniture making are important parts of the province's economic life. Santiago also has major Free Zone centers with four important industrial free zones; it also has an important cement factory. Santiago is home to one of the largest medical centers in the country, Clínica Unión Médica, which serves all 14 provinces of El Cibao.

There are also several nearby towns, many of which are prosperous. It is surrounded by tall mountains that have for years protected it from hurricanes and allow for dense tropical forests to develop on the slopes of such mountains, which are among the highest in the region.

== Geography ==
Santiago province is located in a valley within the Northern Cordillera that crosses the entire north of the country and also is the Diego de Ocampo peak of 1,249 meters above sea level. To the west are numerous hills that separate the Western Valley of the Cibao with the Valley of the Vega Real. The highest mountains in the province are La Pelona, La Rusilla that it shares with La Vega, and Pico Duarte that it shares with the province of San Juan, the latter is the tallest mountain in the Caribbean region.

In the province is the José Armando Bermúdez National Park, one of the largest in the country and the most important forest reserve on the island. The main river that crosses Santiago is the Yaque del Norte, which borders the entire southern part of the province. In addition, there are other rivers of great importance that run through the province such as the Bao, Jagua, Inoa, Ámina and Licey rivers.

== History ==
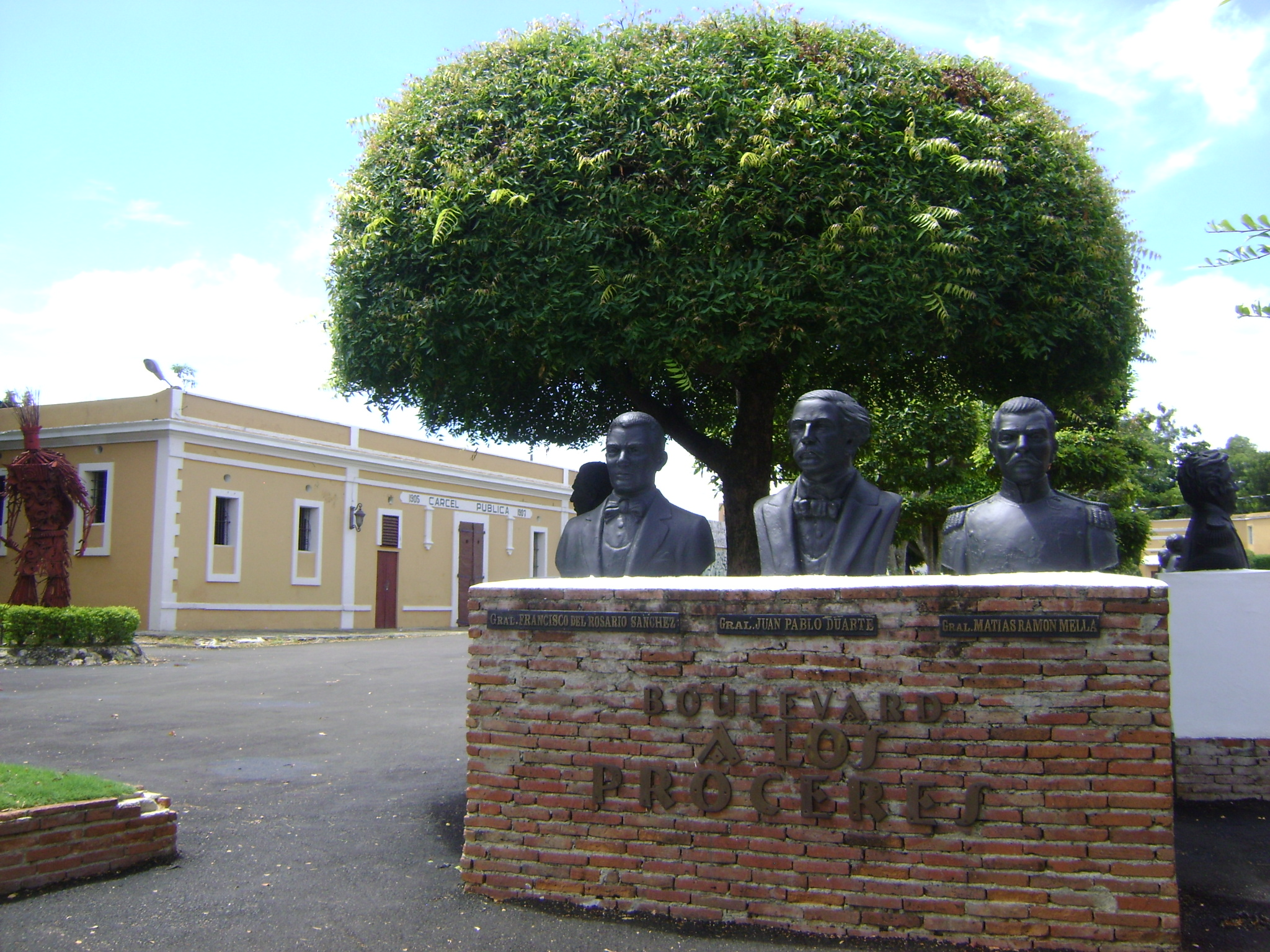
Fortaleza San Luis.

Santiago was founded in 1495, originally on the banks of the Yaque del Norte River, but it is not yet very clear why it was moved in 1504 to the rural community of Jacagua, at the foot of the Diego de Ocampo peak. This seat was destroyed by an earthquake in 1562, then it was moved to where it is today.

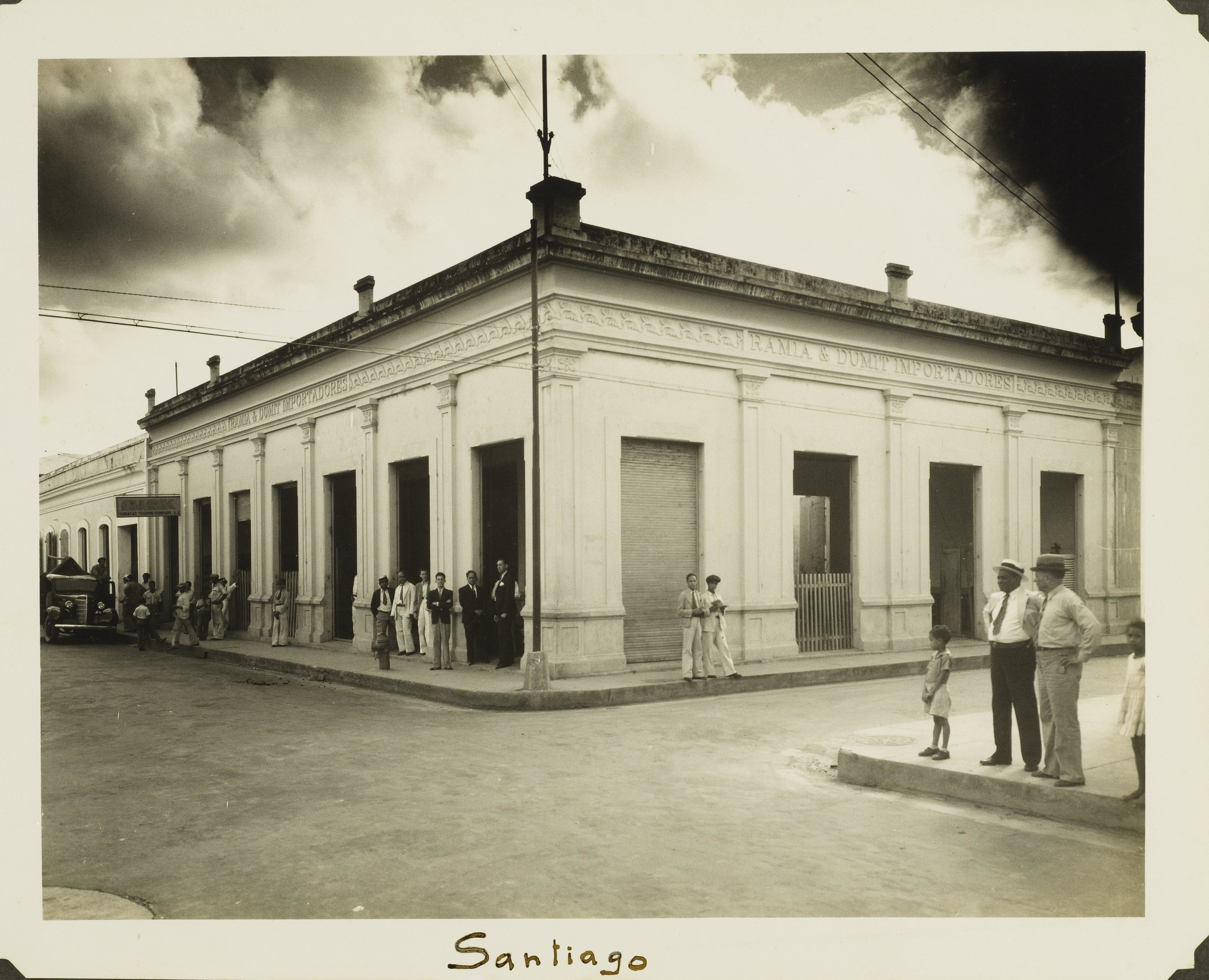
Santiago de los Caballeros in the 1930s.

In 1504 Nicolás de Ovando, the then governor of the island, transferred the province to Jacagua. From a fortress it became a civilian town. The reasons for the transfer are unknown; what is clear, however, is that the new settlement was made on fertile lands. Like other towns on the island, on July 7, 1508, Queen Juana I of Spain granted Santiago the title of town and also granted it a noble coat of arms.

=== Santiago Streets ===
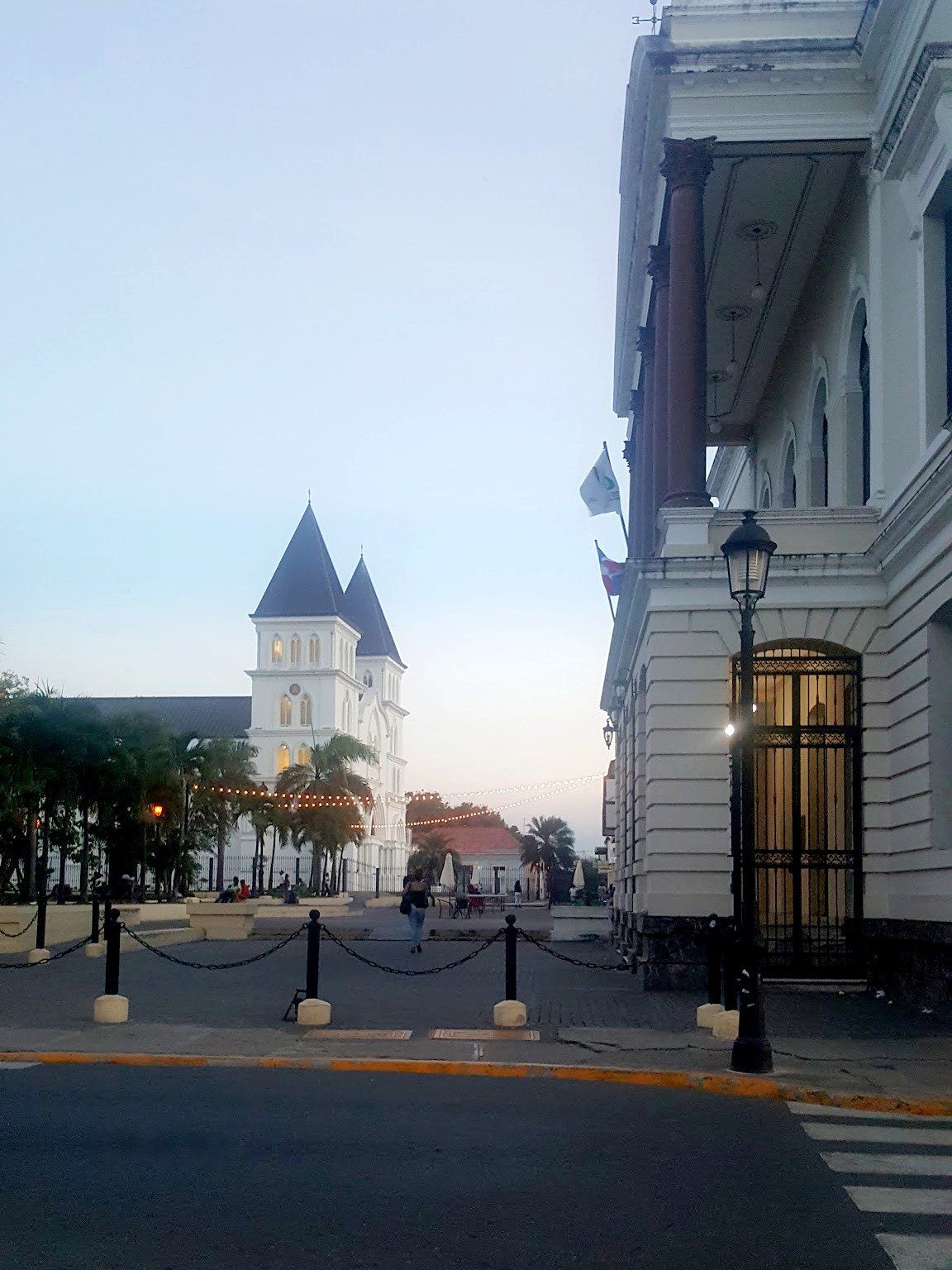

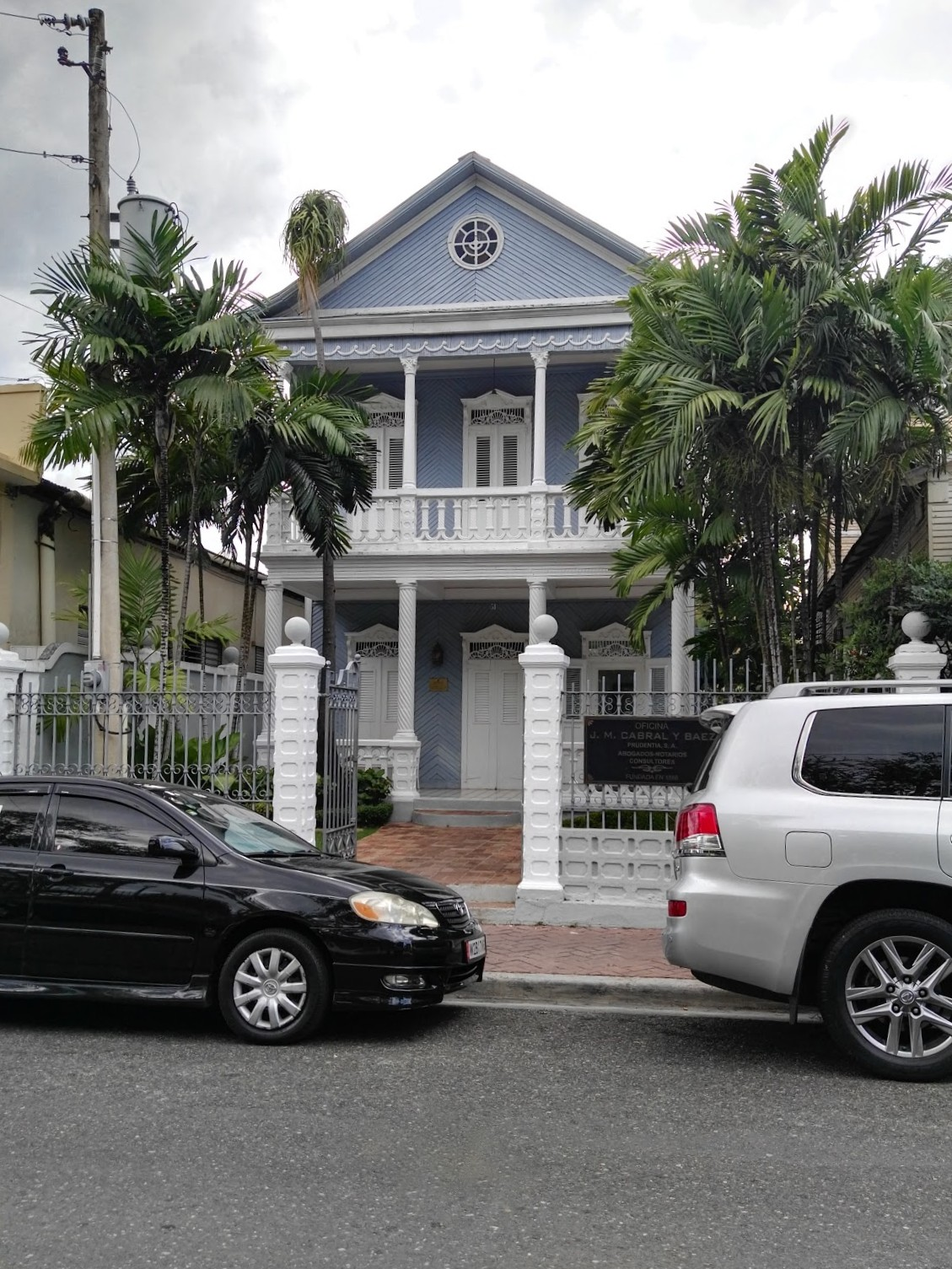

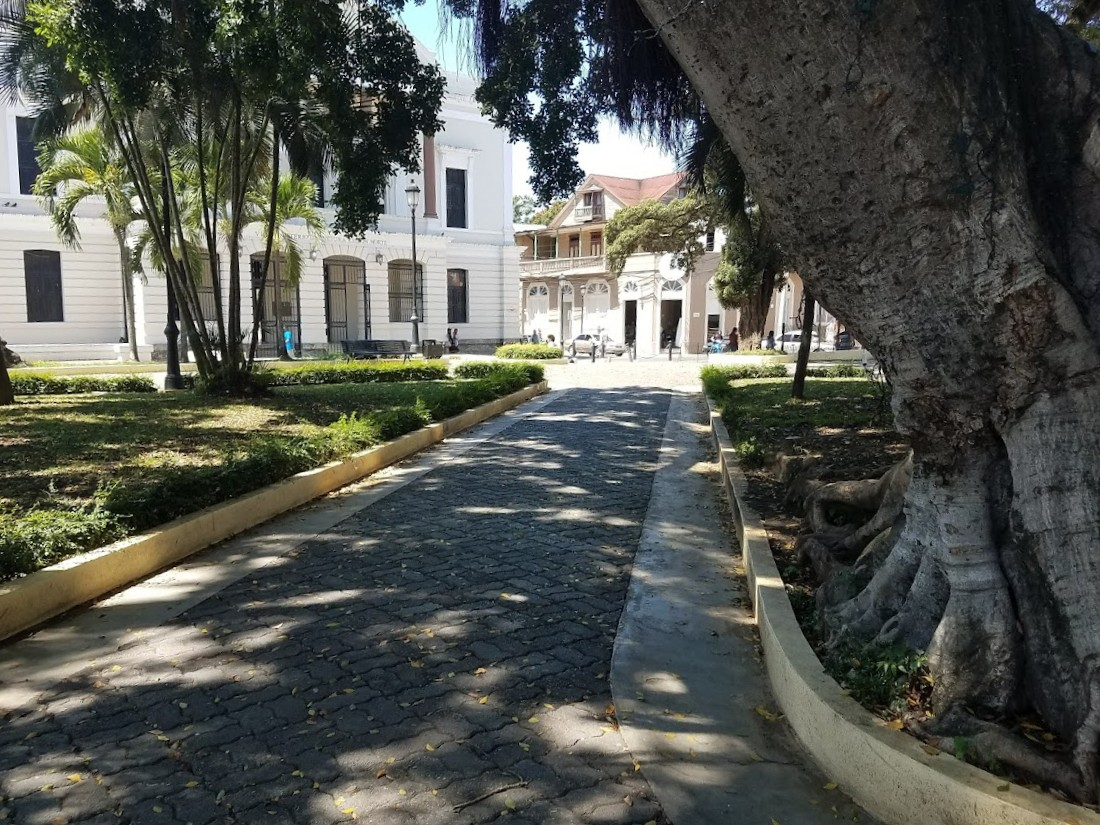

== Economy ==
Santiago is economically one of the most important provinces in the country. It has about 1,500,000 inhabitants and is the province that has the lowest number of unemployed due to its economic diversity. Industries of all kinds are concentrated in Santiago de los Caballeros More than a million people from different parts of the region and the country move daily. The province of Santiago contributes 14% of the GDP of the Dominican Republic.

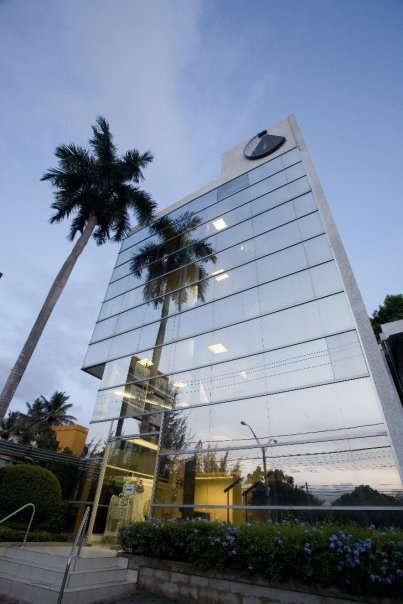
Santiago de los Caballeros, Dominican Republic.

Santiago has a modern rum and tobacco industry that serves international markets. The tobacco industry, as in the past, remains an important part of its economy and a source of thousands of jobs in the area. The region is also a major producer and exporter of raw tobacco to Europe, as well as coffee and cocoa. Its diversified agricultural sector produces numerous crops that supply the Santo Domingo market and other communities. Located in the center of the island, Santiago has road connections that provide access to Santo Domingo, approximately two hours away, and Puerto Plata, approximately 45 minutes away. Both cities have major ports and airports that facilitate the transport of goods and passengers to and from other countries.

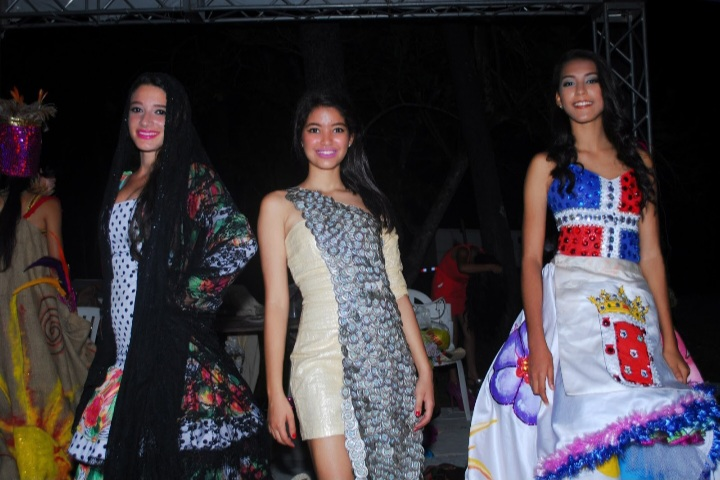
Santiago, Dominican Republic women in carnival dresses.

In the industrial branch, the community has also stood out with notable successes. The development of the industrial sector in Santiago can be divided into two: that of national production and that of free export zones. Internal production is broad in a diverse range of activities, such as cigarettes, shoes, leather, meat food processors, food packaging industries (vegetable and vegetable fats), metal-mechanics, packaging, ceramics, crafts and materials of construction such as cement factory, blocks, windows, doors and others.

Another economic lung of the province is the Industrial Free Zone of Santiago, which produces about 20% of the foreign exchange generated by all the free zones of the country. It is the first in job creation. By 1995, it had a workforce of 32,000 jobs, distributed in 79 companies that manufacture textiles, cigarettes, shoes, plastics, leather, communications, electrical equipment, among others. In 1998 there were an average of 52,943 employees with a total of 114 companies.

The services sector is also strongly development in Santiago. A broad and productive class of merchants, an efficient banking system, communications, tourism, professionals from various disciplines, contribute greatly to the economic and social development of the Dominican Republic. Most of the banking institutions in the Dominican Republic have opened new branches in Santiago, which also helps to boost the economy in the province.

The Free Zones that have been consolidated in this region are considered the strongest and best structured in the Dominican Republic. There are seven industrial parks and they generate approximately 48 thousand direct jobs and move around 30 million pesos per week. In terms of exports, it is estimated about 600 million dollars a year.

== Municipalities and municipal districts ==
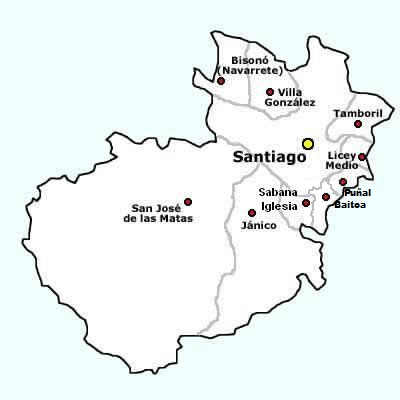
Municipalities of the Province.

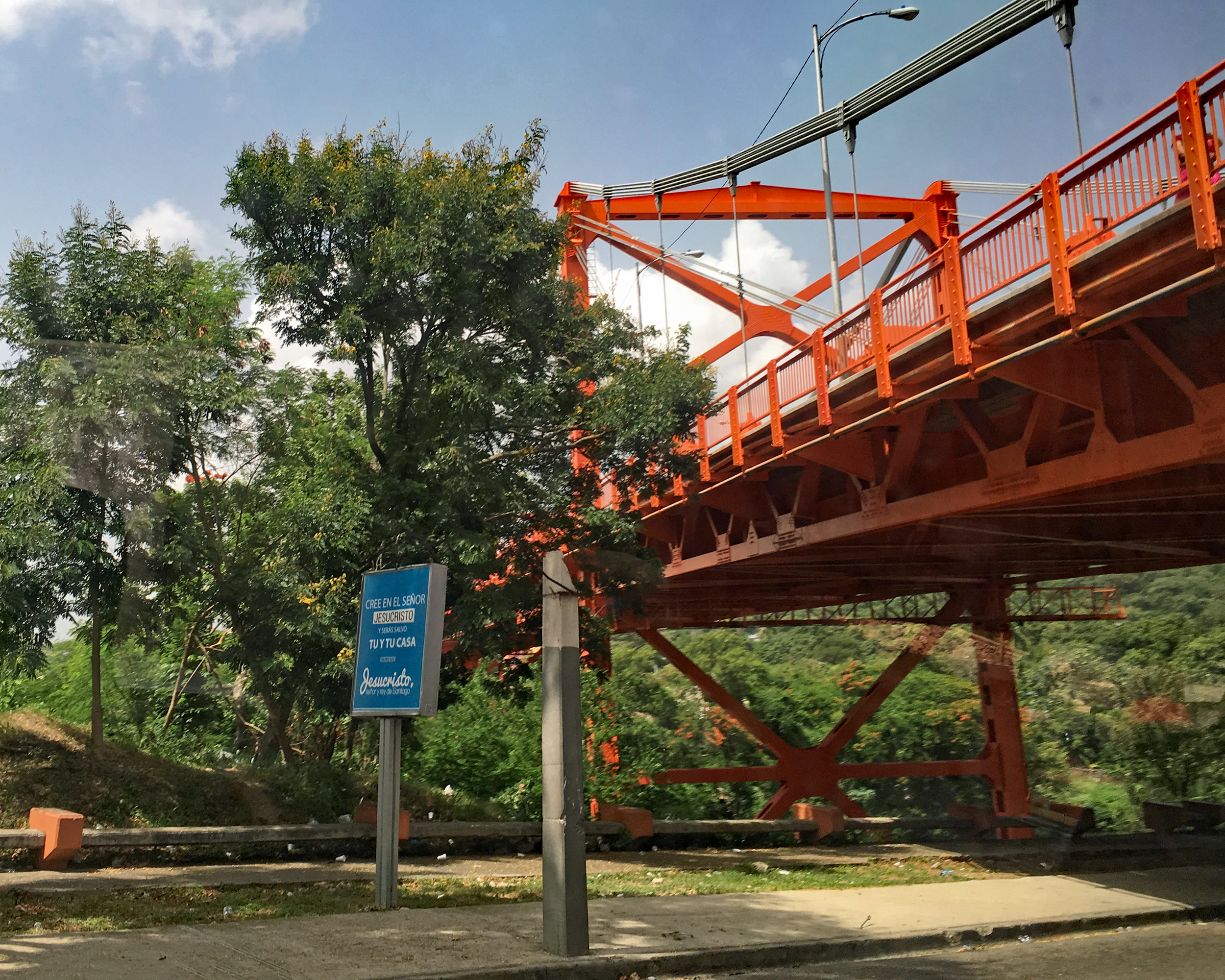
Bridge in Santiago, Dominican Republic.

The province as of 2022 is divided into the following municipalities (municipios) and municipal districts (distritos municipales – D.M.) within them:

- Baitoa
- Jánico
  - El Caimito (D.M.)
  - Juncalito (D.M.)
- Licey al Medio
  - Las Palomas (D.M.)
- Puñal
  - Canabacoa (D.M.)
  - Guayabal (D.M.)
- Sabana Iglesia
  - Sabana Iglesia Abajo (D.M.)
  - Villa Bao (D.M.)
- Santiago de los Caballeros (capital city)
  - Alto Bao (D.M.)
  - Hato del Yaque (D.M.)
  - La Canela (D.M.)
  - Pedro García (D.M.)
  - San Francisco de Jacagua (D.M.)
- San José de las Matas
  - El Rubio (D.M.)
  - La Cuesta (D.M.)
  - Las Placetas (D.M.)
  - Las Manaclas (D.M.)
  - Diferencia (D.M.)
- Tamboril
  - Canca La Piedra (D.M.)
  - Carlos Diaz (D.M)
  - Amaceyes (D.M)
  - Ceboruco (D.M)
- Villa Bisonó
  - Navarrete (D.M.)
- Villa González
  - El Limón (D.M.)
  - Palmar Arriba (D.M.)

The following is a sortable table of the municipalities and municipal districts with population figures as of the 2014 estimate. Urban population are those living in the seats (cabeceras literally heads) of municipalities or of municipal districts. Rural population are those living in the districts (Secciones literally sections) and neighborhoods (Parajes literally places) outside of them. The population figures are from the 2022 population census.

Name	Total population	Urban population	Rural population
Baitoa	11,690	1,938	9,752
Jánico	14,385	3,524	10,861
Licey al Medio	30,103	20,669	9,434
Puñal	46,090	10,574	35,516
Sabana Iglesia	14,018	4,933	9,085
San José de las Matas	37,411	10,312	27,099
Santiago de los Caballeros	771,748	645,075	126,673
Tamboril	57,669	31,664	26,005
Villa Bisonó	49,367	37,463	11,904
Villa González	42,198	17,677	24,521
Santiago province	1,074,679	783,829	290,850

For comparison with the municipalities and municipal districts of other provinces, see the list of municipalities and municipal districts of the Dominican Republic.

== Notable natives ==
- José Acosta — Writer
- † Joaquín Balaguer — Dominican President
- † Rafael Filiberto Bonnelly — Dominican President
- † Pedro Francisco Bonó — Politician
- † Miguel Cocco Guerrero — Politician
- Francisco Dominguez Brito — Lawyer and politician
- † Rafael Estrella Ureña — Vicepresident of the Dominican Republic
- † Antonio Guzmán Fernández — Dominican President
- † Salvador Jorge Blanco — Dominican President
- Eduardo Leon Jimenes — Businessman, Founder of E Leon Jimenes
- Hipólito Mejía — Dominican President
- Orlando Jorge Mera — Politician, General Secretary of the Dominican Revolutionary Party
- † Yoryi Morel — Painter
- Johnny Pacheco — Music band leader
- † Donald Reid Cabral— Dominican President
- Miguel Diloné - Baseball player, MLB outfielder
- Luis Polonia - Baseball player, MLB left fielder
- Winston Llenas (a.k.a. Chilote) - Baseball player, MLB infielder/outfielder
- José Reyes — Baseball player, MLB shortstop
- Julián Tavárez — Baseball player, MLB pitcher
- † José Lima - Baseball player, MLB pitcher
- Joaquín Benoit - Baseball player, MLB pitcher
- Ramón Peña - Baseball player, MLB pitcher
- Carlos Gómez - Baseball player, MLB outfielder
- Tony Peña Jr. - Baseball player, MLB pitcher
- Jhonny Peralta - Baseball player, MLB shortstop/third baseman
- Wandy Rodríguez - Baseball player, MLB pitcher
- † José Desiderio Valverde — Politician
- Amelia Vega — Miss Universe 2003
