= List of Dominican Provinces by date of provincehood =

The following table presents a listing of the Dominican Republic's provinces and the dates of their creation.

Province	Date Created	Preceding Entity	Old Names
Azua	March 12, 1844	One of the Original 5 Provinces	
Bahoruco	March 10, 1943	Separated from Barahona Province	
Barahona	May 16, 1909	Was first a Maritime District from 1870; originally was part of Azua Province before reform in 1845, became province on May 16, 1909	Distrito Marítimo del Sur
Dajabón	April 19, 1938	Separated from Monte Cristi Province	Libertador
Distrito Nacional	January 1, 1935	Santo Domingo Separated into two Provinces	Provincia Nacional, Distrito de Santo Domingo
Duarte	February 27, 1897	Was created out of the San Francisco de Macorís & San Antonio del Yuna municipalities separated from Espaillat Province; and Matanzas Municipality separated from the Samaná Province.	Distrito Pacifícador, Pacifícador
Elías Piña	September 16, 1942	Separated from Benefactor Province	San Rafael, La Estrelleta
El Seibo	March 12, 1844	One of the Original 5 Provinces	Seibo
Espaillat	February 27, 1885	Moca, Jagua, and Juana Núñez separated from Puerto Plata Province; Cotuí, San Francisco de Macorís, & San Antonio del Yuna separated from La Vega Province; and Matanzas separated from Samaná Province so this province could be created.	
Hato Mayor	January 1, 1992	Separated from El Seibo Province	
Hermanas Mirabal	March 3, 1952	Separated from Espaillat Province	Salcedo
Independencia	January 1, 1950	Separated from Baoruco Province	Jimaní, Nueva Era
La Altagracia	August 11, 1961	Taken out of old La Altagracia Province (capital La Romana) which was split into two.	
La Romana	August 11, 1961	Taken out of old La Altagracia Province (capital La Romana) which was split into two.	
La Vega	March 12, 1844	One of the Original 5 Provinces	
María Trinidad Sánchez	February 27, 1959	Separated from Samaná Province	Julia Molina
Monseñor Nouel	January 1, 1992	Separated from La Vega Province	
Monte Cristi	September 9, 1907	Was first a Maritime District from 1874; originally was part of Santiago Province before reform in 1845, became a province on September 9, 1907	Distrito Marítimo Occidental
Monte Plata	January 1, 1992	Separated from San Cristóbal Province	
Pedernales	December 16, 1957	Separated from Barahona Province	
Peravia	November 23, 1944	Separated from Azua Province	Baní, José Trujillo Valdez
Puerto Plata	February 27, 1850	Was first a Maritime District from 1845; originally was part of Santiago Province before reform in 1845, became province on February 27, 1850	Distrito Marítimo del Norte
Samaná	June 4, 1867	Was first a Maritime District from 1845; originally was part of La Vega Province before reform in 1845, became province on June 4, 1867	Distrito Marítimo Oriental
Sánchez Ramírez	July 9, 1952	Separated from Duarte Province	
San Cristóbal	March 1, 1933	Santo Domingo Separated into two Provinces	Alto Ozama, Trujillo
San José de Ocoa	January 1, 2002	Separated from Peravia Province	
San Juan	June 20, 1938	Separated from Azua Province	Benefactor, San Juan de la Maguana
San Pedro de Macorís	January 24, 1907	Was first a Maritime District from 1860; originally was part of Santo Domingo Province before reform in 1845, became province on January 24, 1907	Distrito Marítimo Centrosur
Santiago	March 12, 1844	One of the Original 5 Provinces	
Santiago Rodríguez	October 22, 1948	Separated from Monte Cristi Province	
Santo Domingo	October 16, 2001	Separated from Distrito Nacional	
Valverde	January 1, 1959	Separated from Santiago	Mao

== Extinct Province ==
There were two provinces that are extinct in the Dominican Republic.

Extinct Province	Old Capital	Old Municipalities	Date Created	Date of Extinction	Province Separated	Integrated into/Converted to
Alto Ozama	San Cristóbal	Baní, Bayaguana, Monte Plata, Sabana Grande de Boyá, San Cristóbal, Villa Altagracia, Yamasá	November 10, 1932	March 1, 1933	When Santo Domingo Province split into two provinces, created this province alongside Provincia Nacional Province	Merged with Ozama Province to make Trujillo Province
La Altagracia	La Romana	La Romana, Salvaleón de Higüey	September 14, 1944	August 11, 1961	Seibo Province	La Romana Province, new La Altagracia Province by separating the municipalities of Guaymate and San Rafael del Yuma on February 27, 1960.
Monseñor de Meríño	Monte Plata	Bayaguana, Boca Chica, La Victoria, Monte Plata, Sabana Grande de Boyá, San Antonio de Guerra, San Luis, Villa Mella, Yamasá	April 12, 1938	March 4, 1946	Trujillo Province	The municipalities Boca Chica, La Victoria, San Antonio de Guerra, San Luis, and Villa Mella merged with the Municipality of Santo Domingo and became sectors of the city in the Distrito Santo Domingo, the rest of the municipalities went back to Trujillo Province.
Ozama	Villa Mella	Boca Chica, La Victoria, San Antonio de Guerra, San Luis, Villa Mella	January 3, 1928	March 1, 1928	Santo Domingo Province	Merged with Ozama Province to make Trujillo Province
Provincia Nacional	Herrera	Herrera, Los Alcarrizos, Los Mina, Pedro Brand, Santo Domingo	November 10, 1932	January 1, 1935	When Santo Domingo Province split into two provinces, created this province alongside Alto Ozama Province	Distrito Nacional (all the municipalities merged to one, Santo Domingo)
Santo Domingo	San Cristóbal	Baní, Bayaguana, Herrera, Los Alcarrizos, Los Mina, Monte Plata, Pedro Brand, Sabana Grande de Boyá, San Cristóbal, Santo Domingo, Villa Altagracia, Yamasá	March 12, 1844	November 10, 1932	One of the Original 5 Provinces	Alto Ozama Province, Provincia Nacional
