= Pueblo Viejo mine =

Gold mine in Sánchez Ramírez, Dominican Republic

- Location within the Dominican Republic
- Location: Cotuí, Sánchez Ramírez Province, Dominican Republic; 18.9396°N 70.1753°W
- Products: Gold; Silver
- Company: Barrick Gold Corporation; Newmont Corporation
- Website: https://puebloviejolugardevalor.com/
- Acquired: 2009 (operated 1975-1999 by Rosario Dominicana, S. A.

Local impacts
- Pollution: Acid mine drainage, cyanide, heavy metals polluting Maguaca and Margajita rivers and Hatillo Dam
- Displaced: 65 families; additional 400-600 families requesting relocation, but denied
- Jobs: 2,350 employees and 2,500 contractors
- Development: $2.6 billion in tax revenues from 2013-2020; 2% of Dominican Republic’s GDP

The Pueblo Viejo mine is an open-pit gold and silver mine in the Sánchez Ramírez Province of the Dominican Republic where mining operations started in 2012 and expect to cease in 2041. It is the largest gold mine in Latin America and 13th largest gold mine in the world. The mine is run by Pueblo Viejo Dominicana Corporation (PVDC), which is 60% owned by Barrick Gold Corporation and 40% owned by Newmont Corporation.

Pueblo Viejo employs approximately 2,350 employees and 2,500 contractors. The economic activities of the mine represent 2% of the Dominican Republic’s gross domestic product and Pueblo Viejo is the largest corporate taxpayer in the country.

The mine has generated an environmental conflict, because pollution from the tailings dam and windblown particulates have contaminated rivers and killed local livestock who ingested the toxins. Local communities say that the mine has ruined their lives and caused many health problems: skin lesions are common; children are sickened by chemical vapors; and agricultural land is no longer productive. Local people have asked to be relocated away from the mine since 2013, but neither the government nor the company have responded to their requests.

The company proposed to expand the mine in 2019, meeting with fierce resistance from communities in Yamasá who would be impacted by the expansion.

== History ==
Pueblo Viejo was the first gold deposit exploited by the Spaniards in America.

The mine was operated by state-owned mining company Rosario Dominicana, S. A., from 1975 until 1991 when mining became economically unfeasible and a contaminated site with acid rock drainage was left behind. In 2001, the Dominican government opened tenders for a new mining operation on the site with a mandate to first remediate the site which had a major water contamination problem at the hands of the previous state-owned operator. The following year, the Dominican government issued a special lease agreement with the Vancouver-based mining company Placer Dome to study the feasibility of reopening the mine but only after the existing environmental damage had been cleaned up and the land reclaimed in the previous mining area.

In 2006 Placer Dome was acquired by Barrick who subsequently sold 40% of its stake in Pueblo Viejo to Goldcorp, creating the PVDC joint venture to operate the mine.

=== Environmental rehabilitation project ===
$75 million was spent to remediate environmental impacts from the former mining operation on the site and $7 million was spent on projects to improve healthcare, housing and literacy for local communities between 2008 and 2013. The clean-up effort included removing 130,000 cubic meters of soil to remove contaminants from the ground. It became the largest environmental clean-up in the history of the Dominican Republic and the water quality rose to meet regulatory standards in the aquifers around the site.

Between 2009 and 2013, Canadian companies Barrick Gold and Goldcorp invested $4 billion into the mine, making it the largest single foreign investment in the Dominican Republic, and estimating a mine life of at least 25 years. The government and the mining companies presented the investment as an opportunity to clean up the contamination left by earlier mining operations.

Prior to the resuming of mining activities around 2012, communities near the mine relied primarily on farming of cacao and livestock.

== Environment and society ==
Annually, the mine produces approximately 6.7 billion cubic meters of highly acidic wastewater that contains significant traces of heavy metals, and studies have found that this poses a significant risk to local water supplies.

Six nearby villages comprising about 450 families (around 2,000 individuals) have reported drastic changes in the environment since PVDC began its operations around 2012. They reported many livestock deaths, including deaths from bovine anemia, which can be caused by ingesting cyanide. There were also fish kills in the Maguaca river. After the mine opened, children were sickened by chemical smells and teachers were forced to close schools. In 2021, residents reported that standing in the Maguaca river can cause persistent lesions that last for years; scores of people in the area have scars from these skin lesions. Agricultural land in the area ceased to be productive. A resident who was interviewed in 2021 reported that,

Before Barrick came to this land, we were like millionaires. We had a lot of water. We farmed and grew fruits. The land provided us everything we needed. But now there is nothing here.

More than 100 employees were poisoned by toxic chemicals in 2012. Nearby homes have been damaged by repeated explosions from the mine.

The 114-meter-tall (374 ft) tailings dam for the mine is called El Llagal. Sixty-five families were displaced to build the dam. El Llagal is classified as having an 'extreme' consequence of failure, meaning that over 100 people would be killed.

=== Studies and testing ===
PVDC says that it regularly tests water and air for pollution and makes the information public, although community leaders say they are unaware of these tests. The Economist reported that the company did not respond to requests for that data in 2013, and PVDC declined to provide the data to a researcher from Simon Fraser University in 2019. A request for data from the Jacobin in 2021 was also refused. The Environment ministry found that water in the Margajita river downstream from the mine was highly acidic, and had contaminants that exceeded legal limits. A 2019 report on communities around the Pueblo Viejo mine was censored by the Dominican government. Testing has revealed high levels of lead, sulphur, cyanide and zinc in the blood of local residents.

The Dominican Academy of Sciences concluded in 2012 that the mine had contaminated the Hatillo dam.

In 2014, high levels of cyanide and other heavy metals were found in the blood and urine of residents in four local villages. The test concluded that the toxins were absorbed through respiration and contaminated water.

Barrick gold says that it has remediated “environmental damage left by previous operations at the mine”, and "contributed to the improvement of the environment and especially the water quality.” The company says it has data that show improvement in water quality of the Margajita river from 2004 to 2020.

Experts have said there is not adequate historical water quality data to scientifically determine the cause of contamination in the local rivers.

=== Protests ===
Since 2013, local residents have sustained a protest movement demanding that the government relocate them from the contaminated area. Community members report that PVDC pays local people to inform them about the protests, leading to distrust and fragmentation in the community.

Demonstrators occupied space outside the mine, chained themselves to chairs, and demanded relocation for over 600 families in November 2017.

== Production and reserves ==
Barrick reported production of 581,000 ounces of gold in 2018 and 6.55 million ounces of gold in reserve.

Gold is recovered from the ore using a pressure oxidation process, performed in four autoclaves which operate at 3.45 MPa and 230 °C.

Cyanide is used to extract the gold from the ore.

== Revenue and development ==
According to PVDC, gold from Pueblo Viejo averaged about 31% of the value of exports from the Dominican Republic from 2013-2020. The company paid over $2.6 billion in taxes during this same period, and also employs thousands of people. Barrick Gold made advance payments on taxes to help the government respond to the COVID-19 pandemic.

The mine employed 2,500 people in 2021, 97% of whom were Dominican nationals. In 2023, 23% of mine employees were women.

== Expansion ==
In 2019, PVDC proposed to expand the mine, requiring an additional tailings dam in Yamasá. The proposed expansion led to additional protests. In April 2021, police dispersed a protest against the mine with tear gas.
