= Monte Plata Province =

Province of the Dominican Republic

Monte Plata
- Province
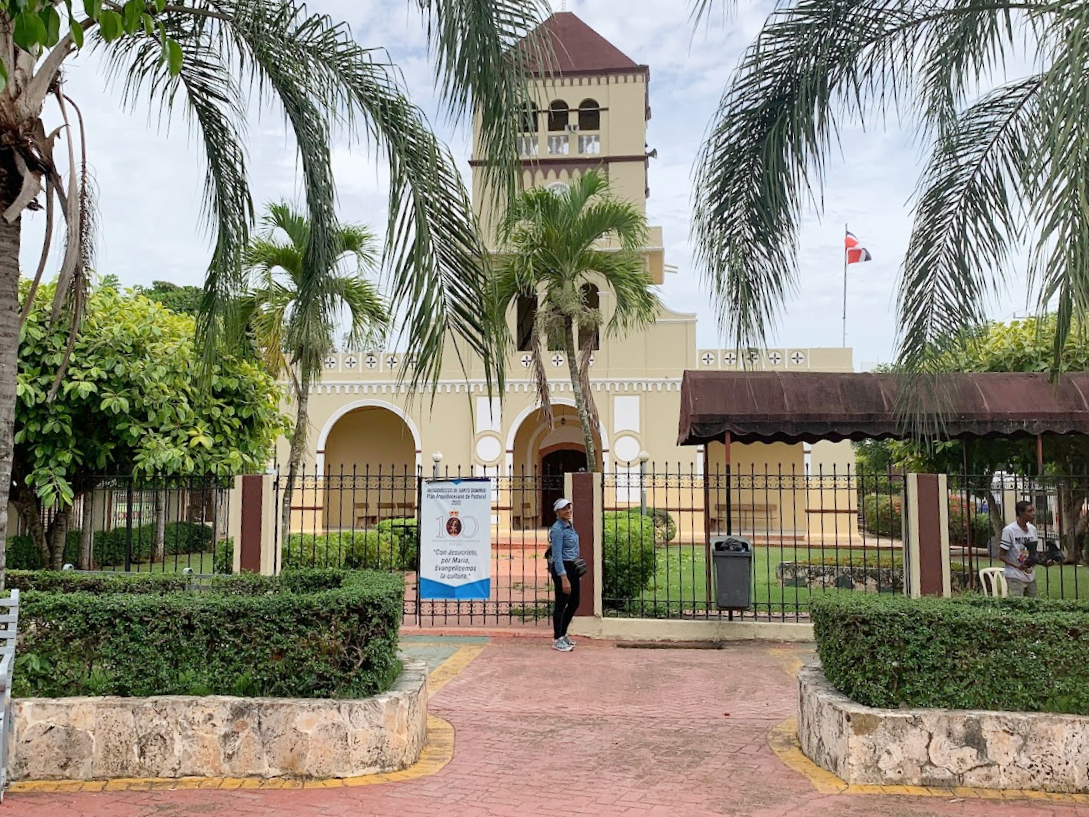
- Church of Bayaguana in Monte Plata, Dominican Republic

- Location of the Monte Plata Province
- Country: Dominican Republic
- Province since: 1991
- Capital: Monte Plata

Government
  - Type: Subdivisions
  - Body: 5 municipalities 6 municipal districts
  - Congresspersons: 1 Senator; 4 Deputies

Area
  - Total: 2,632.14 km^{2} (1,016.27 sq mi)

Population (2014)
  - Total: 222,641
  - Density: 84.5855/km^{2} (219.076/sq mi)
- Time zone: UTC-4 (AST)
- Area code: 1-809 1-829 1-849
- ISO 3166-2: DO-29
- Postal Code: 92000

Monte Plata (Spanish pronunciation: [ˈmonte ˈplata]) is an eastern province of the Dominican Republic, and also the name of its capital city. It was split from San Cristóbal in 1992.

The province is bordered to the north by the Sánchez Ramírez, Duarte and Samaná provinces, to the east by the Hato Mayor and San Pedro de Macorís provinces, to the south the province of Santo Domingo, and to the west by the provinces of San Cristóbal and Monseñor Nouel.

== History ==
The territory that the province of Monte Plata occupies today, was part of the Taino chiefdom of Higüey or Icayagua. The establishment of the population that today lives in the northern enclaves of the city of Santo Domingo and that bear the names Monte Plata and Bayaguana are a consequence of the so-called devastations of Ozorio (1605-1606), the Spanish authorities, in 1603 decided by means of a Royal Decree to depopulate the northwest area of the island in order to eliminate the smuggling of cattle, hides and other products that was being produced by that part of the island.

The populations with their belongings from the cities of Monte Cristi, Puerto Plata, Bayajá and Yaguana were transferred to the southeast of the island where two new cities named Monte Plata and Bayaguana were founded, the names of these cities are the result of the fusion of Monte Cristi and Puerto Plata, and Bayajá and Yaguana.

On May 7, 1842, a strong earthquake shook the city of Monte Plata. One day before the proclamation of Dominican independence in 1844, General Matías Moreno announced independence in Monte Plata, while summoning the troops under his command to march towards the city of Santo Domingo.

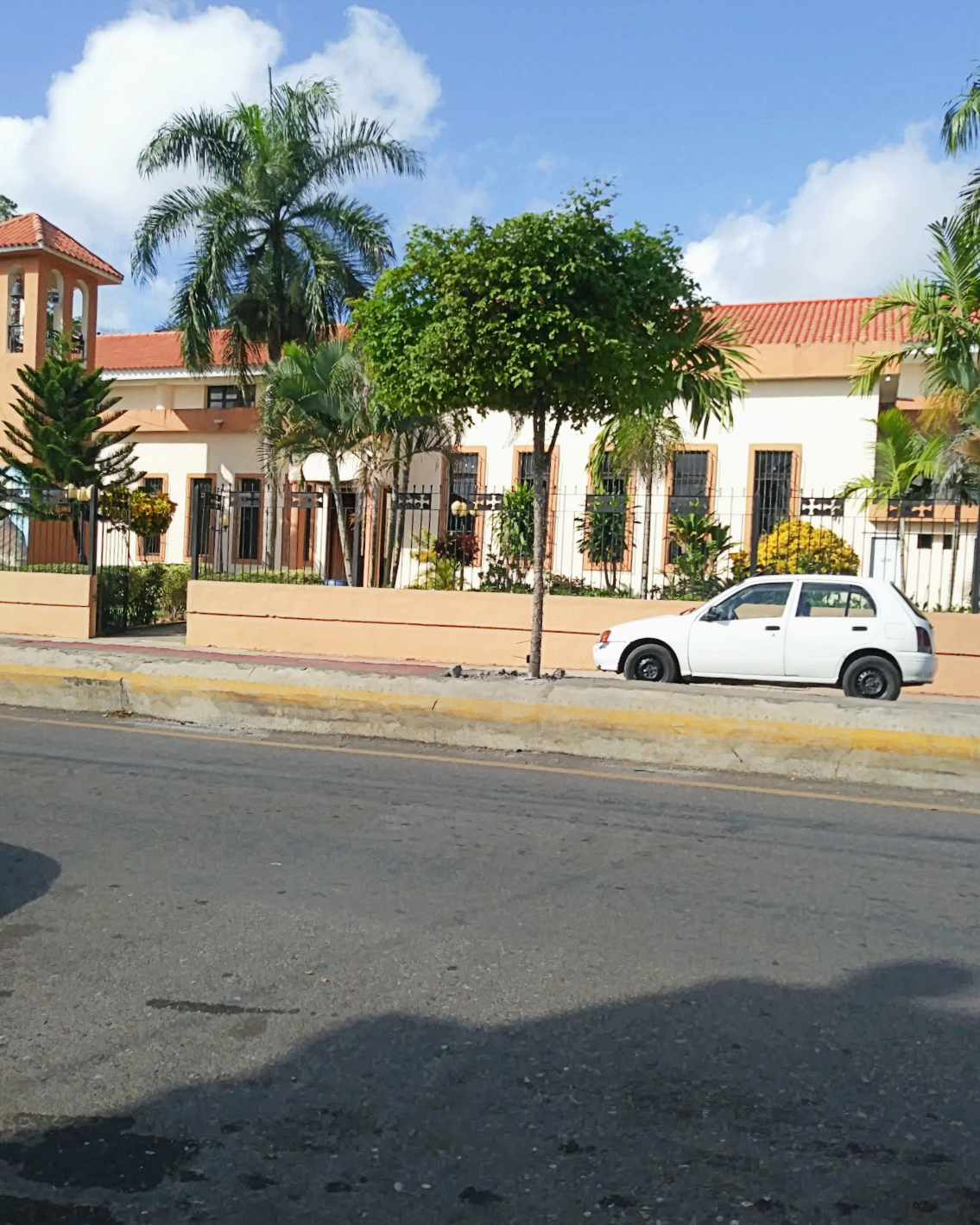
Town street of Monte Plata, Dominican Republic

Monte Plata was also the scene of the Battle of Bermejo, on September 30, 1863. In it the Spanish troops faced against Dominican nationalist. The Spanish left Monte Plata on March 7, 1864; the restorative forces immediately occupied the square. The next day President Salcedo established his headquarters in Monte Plata. On that same date, he appointed Benigno Filomeno Rojas as general in chief of the eastern armies, replacing General Luperón. President Salcedo remained in Monte Plata for 6 days, until March 13. On April 23, 1868 Buenaventura Báez was proclaimed President of the Republic in Monte Plata. At the end of 1879 the combat of Porquero or Arroyo Porquero between liberals, represented by Ulises Heureaux, and conservatives, loyal to President Cesáreo Guillermo, took place in Monte Plata. It was an action of the utmost importance since, with the triumph of Heureaux, the political dominance of the Cibao over the south was established.

Starting in 1930, the urban aspect of Monte Plata was outlined with the construction of the square, the church, the market and the park, thanks to the management of the priest Emiliano Camarena. Inhabitants of the surrounding sections came to the city on the first Friday of each month to exchange their products.

== Geography ==
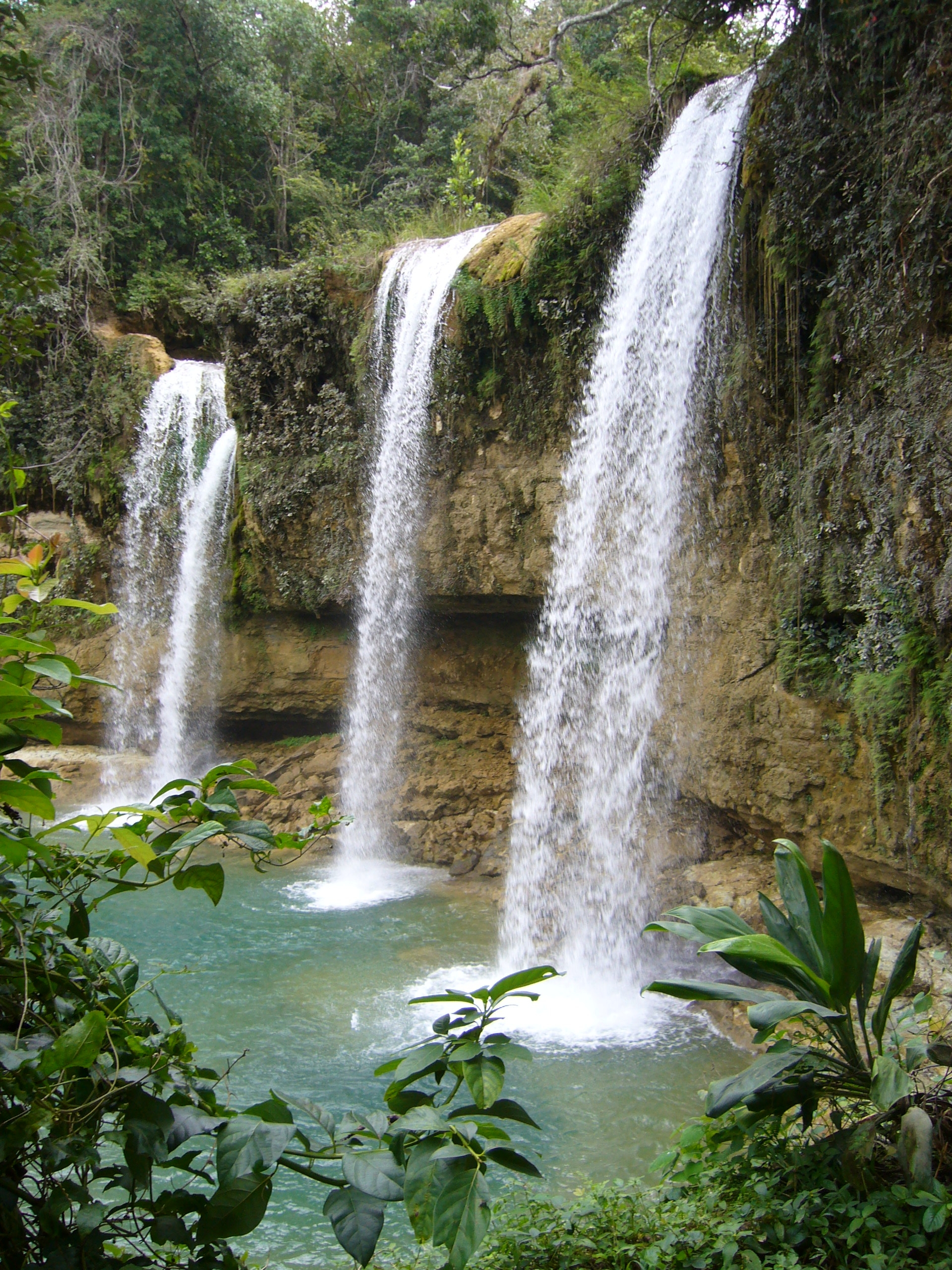
Waterfalls of Bayaguana

Monte Plata has an area of 2,615.29 square kilometers, Guanuma is Part of Monte Plata and home of the monkeys, ranking in 5th place in terms of surface area with 5.4% of the national territory. In the western part of the province is the Sierra de Yamasá mountain range. Part of the Los Haitises National Park, with its scenic landscapes, is also located in the northeast of the province. The main rivers in the province are the Ozama and the Yabacao. Other rivers are Comate, Yamasá, Mijo, Sabita and Guanuma.

== Culture ==
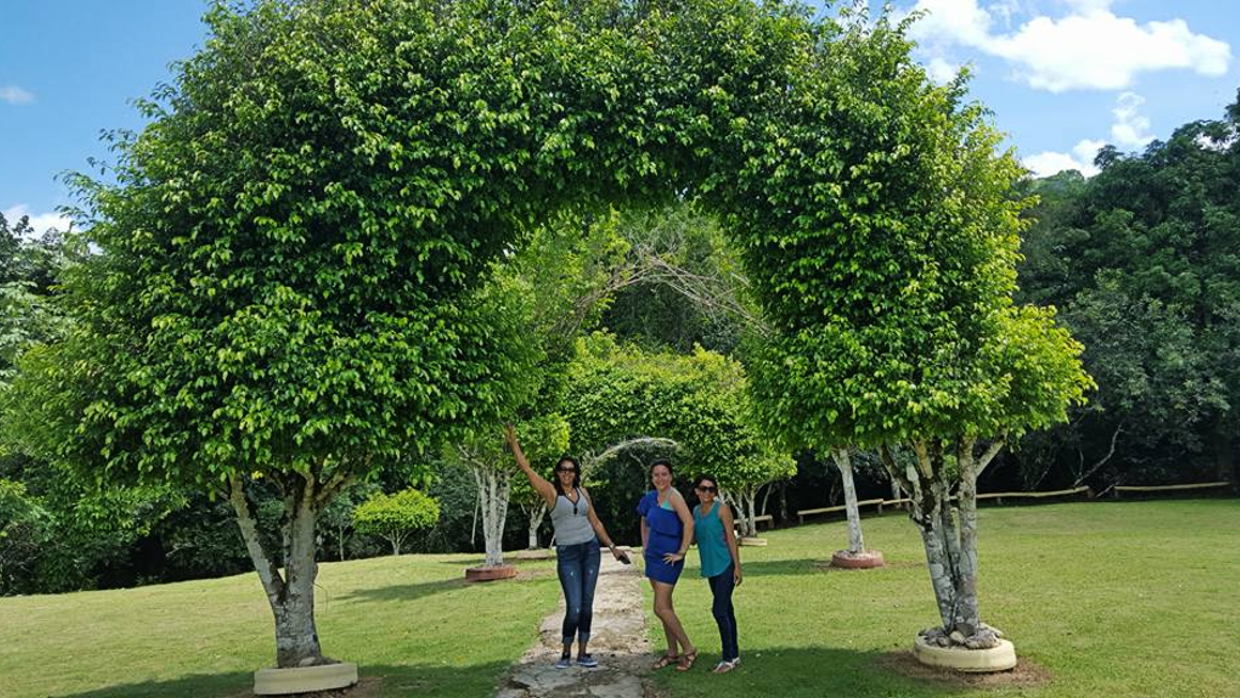
Monte Plata, Dominican Republic Park

Patron Festivities The patron saint festivities of Monte Plata are celebrated from January 11 to 22 of each year, in honor of La Virgen de la Altagracia. This festival comes from the middle of the 18th century; previously they were celebrated in honor of San Antonio de Padua, on June 13. Mural in Monte Plata, RD.

The Bayaguana patrons are the most popular and crowded of the Monte Plata province festivals. The patron saint festivities of San Juan Bautista de Bayaguana are celebrated from June 14 to 23 of each year. To culminate, on June 24 with the celebration of the day of San Juan Bautista, patron of the town. Celebrations include masses, parties with popular music, horse races, and other recreational activities. On December 28 of each year in Bayaguana, the collected bulls are offered to Santo Cristo de los Milagros, whose sanctuary is a place of pilgrimage and expression of faith throughout the year.

== Economy ==
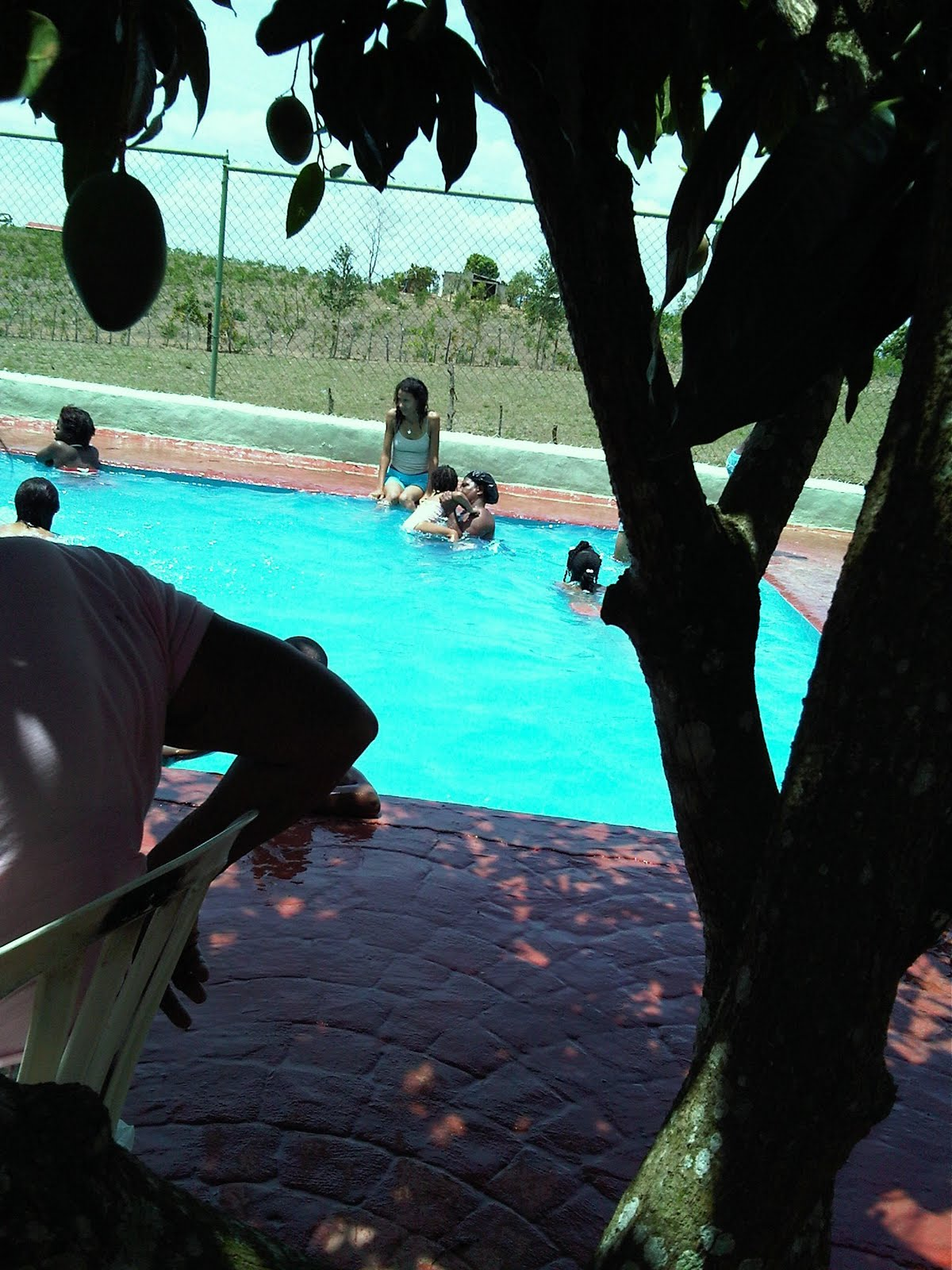
People at public pool in Monte Plata, Dominican Republic

The main activity in the Monte Plata province is agriculture. The lines that most affect the economy of the province are cultivation of crops and cattle ranching. Among the important crops that can be found here are cocoa, sugar cane, corn, yams, cassava, yautía, citrus and others. Regarding livestock, the vaccine is important, both milk and meat are produced in this province.

Despite the fact that the province has outstanding waterfalls, rivers and a strategic location, Monte Plata has not yet been able to develop its eco-tourism potential, only having an economic activity in this area near the Los Haitises National Park and the Bayaguana municipality.

== Municipalities and municipal districts ==
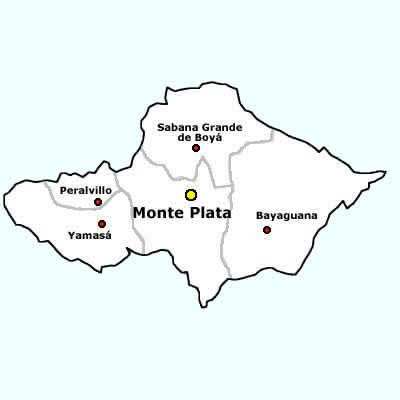
Municipalities of Monte Plata Province

The province as of June 20, 2006 is divided into the following municipalities (municipios) and municipal districts (distrito municipal - D.M.) within them:

- Bayaguana
- Monte Plata
  - Boyá (D.M.)
  - Chirino (D.M.)
  - Don Juan (D.M.)
- Peralvillo (Esperalvillo)
- Sabana Grande de Boyá
  - Gonzalo (D.M.)
  - Majagual (D.M.)
- Yamasá
  - Los Botados (D.M.)

== Population ==
The following is a sortable table of the municipalities and municipal districts with population figures as of the 2012 census. Urban population are those living in the seats (cabeceras literally heads) of municipalities or of municipal districts. Rural population are those living in the districts (Secciones literally sections) and neighborhoods (Parajes literally places) outside of them. For comparison with the municipalities and municipal districts of other provinces see the list of municipalities and municipal districts of the Dominican Republic.

Name	Total population	Urban population	Rural population
Bayaguana	34,786	19,001	15,785
Monte Plata	57,553	26,898	30,655
Peralvillo	20,048	7,558	12,490
Sabana Grande de Boyá	30,085	20,430	9,655
Yamasá	57,982	30,544	27,438
Monte Plata province	200,454	104,431	96,023
