= Platanal Cotui =

Town of the Dominican Republic

Platanal Cotuí
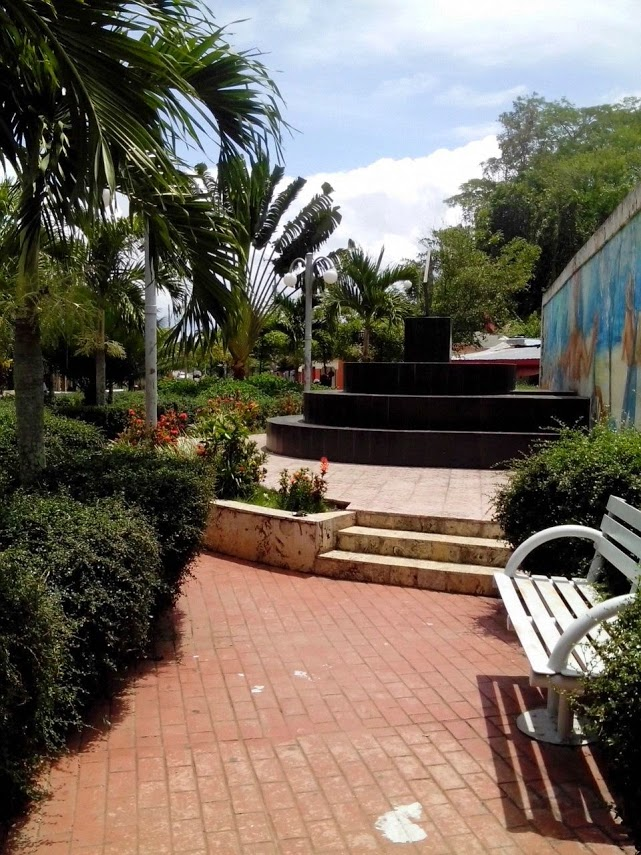

- Location within the Dominican Republic
- Coordinates: 19°07′42″N 70°05′58″W
- Country: Dominican Republic
- Province: Sánchez Ramírez
- Established: 2005

Population
  - Total: 3,531

Platanal Cotuí is a town in the Dominican Republic, which is located in the province of Sánchez Ramírez and belongs to the municipality of Cotuí.

== Foundation ==
Platanal is a municipal district that belongs to the municipality of Cotuí, Sánchez Ramírez province, it was elevated to this category by Law No. 2–05 on January 14, 2005. It is made up of the settlements of Alto de Casiano, Chacuey, Babari, and surrounding areas. According to the 2010 Population and Housing Census, the district had a population of 3,531 inhabitants.
