= Cevicos =

- Cevicos in the Dominican Republic
- Coordinates: 19°0′0″N 69°58′48″W
- Country: Dominican Republic
- Province: Sánchez Ramírez

Area
  - Total: 305.64 km^{2} (118.01 sq mi)

Population (2012)
  - Total: 12,589
  - Density: 41.189/km^{2} (106.68/sq mi)
  - Urban: 4,285
- Municipal Districts: 2 (La Cueva, Platanal)

Cevicos is a town and municipality in the Sánchez Ramírez province of the Dominican Republic. Municipal population, as of 2012, is of 12,589. Town's proper population is of 4,285.

== Overview ==
The town is located in a green plateau between Cotuí and Sabana Grande de Boyá. It municipal district (or hamlet) is the village of La Cueva.

Cevicos produces fruits like mango, pineapple, sugar cane, passion fruit and many others.

== Climate ==
Climate data for Cevicos (1961–1990)
Month	Jan	Feb	Mar	Apr	May	Jun	Jul	Aug	Sep	Oct	Nov	Dec	Year
Record high °C (°F)	35.5 (95.9)	35.0 (95.0)	36.0 (96.8)	37.5 (99.5)	38.0 (100.4)	37.5 (99.5)	36.0 (96.8)	38.0 (100.4)	39.0 (102.2)	38.0 (100.4)	35.0 (95.0)	34.0 (93.2)	39.0 (102.2)
Mean daily maximum °C (°F)	28.2 (82.8)	29.2 (84.6)	30.4 (86.7)	31.1 (88.0)	31.4 (88.5)	32.0 (89.6)	31.9 (89.4)	32.0 (89.6)	32.1 (89.8)	31.5 (88.7)	29.7 (85.5)	28.2 (82.8)	30.6 (87.1)
Mean daily minimum °C (°F)	17.5 (63.5)	17.6 (63.7)	18.1 (64.6)	19.1 (66.4)	20.3 (68.5)	20.9 (69.6)	21.1 (70.0)	21.0 (69.8)	20.8 (69.4)	20.6 (69.1)	19.7 (67.5)	18.3 (64.9)	19.6 (67.3)
Record low °C (°F)	10.0 (50.0)	12.0 (53.6)	12.0 (53.6)	11.8 (53.2)	14.5 (58.1)	16.5 (61.7)	16.2 (61.2)	17.0 (62.6)	18.0 (64.4)	17.0 (62.6)	12.2 (54.0)	12.0 (53.6)	10.0 (50.0)
Average rainfall mm (inches)	80.0 (3.15)	84.0 (3.31)	108.1 (4.26)	145.9 (5.74)	271.4 (10.69)	265.4 (10.45)	240.8 (9.48)	288.5 (11.36)	205.7 (8.10)	200.6 (7.90)	149.6 (5.89)	117.8 (4.64)	2,157.8 (84.95)
Average rainy days (≥ 1.0 mm)	10.8	9.1	10.0	9.4	15.6	16.3	17.5	18.6	14.6	14.4	13.4	12.5	162.2
Source: NOAA
