= Sandy Brito =

Dominican baseball player (born 1996)

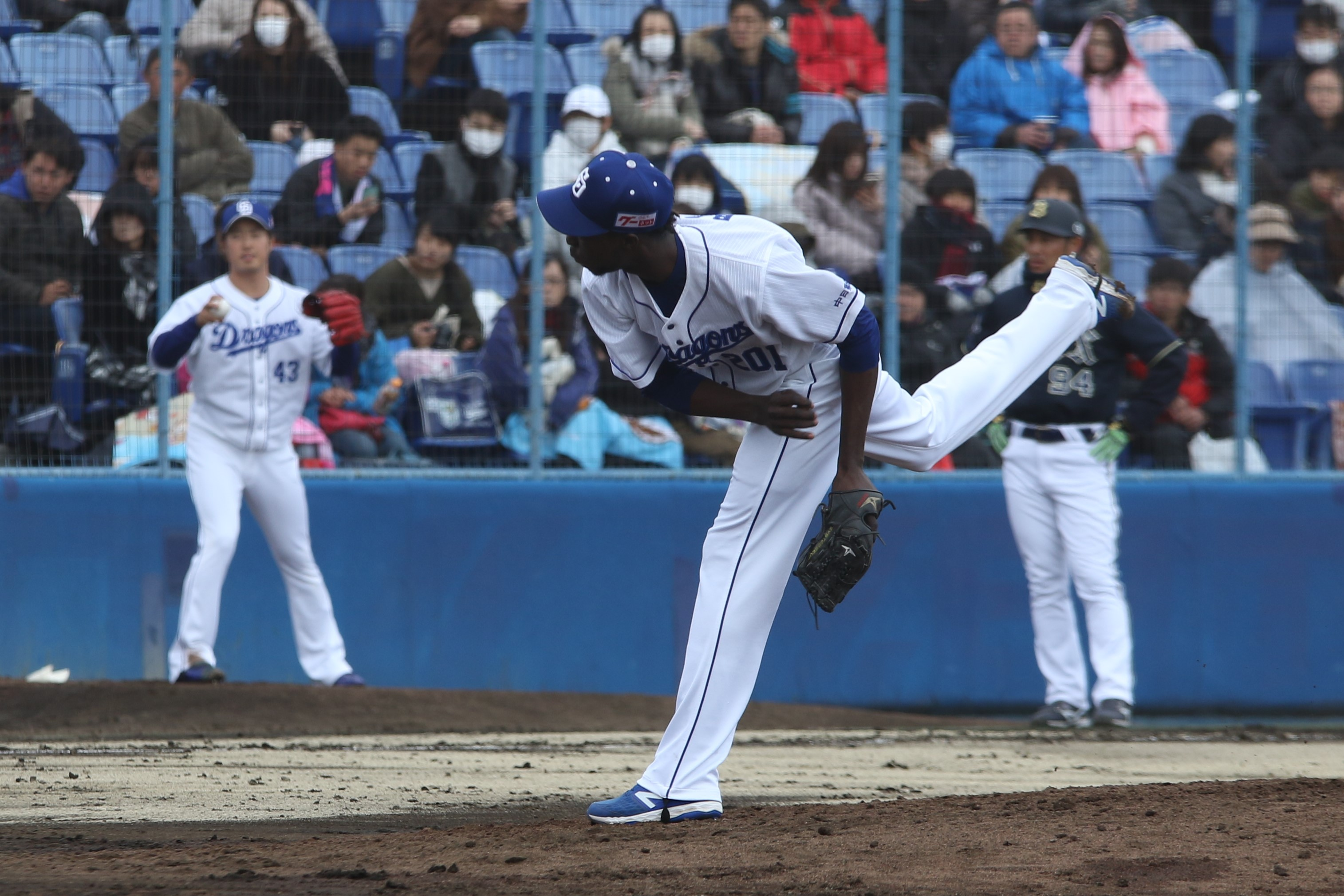

Free agent
- Pitcher
- Born: July 19, 1996 (age 29); Sabana Grande de Boyá, Dominican Republic
- Bats: Right Throws: Right

Teams
- Chunichi Dragons (2019–2020)

Sandy Brito (born July 19, 1996) is a Dominican professional baseball pitcher who is a free agent. He has previously played for the farm team of the Chunichi Dragons of Nippon Professional Baseball (NPB), and in the Tampa Bay Rays organization.

== Career ==
=== Tampa Bay Rays ===
On December 16, 2013, Brito signed a minor league contract with the Tampa Bay Rays organization. He made his professional debut in 2014 with the Dominican Summer League Rays. In 2015, Brito played for the rookie-level Gulf Coast League Rays, recording a 0–2 record and 5.30 ERA and 19 strikeouts in 15 games. In 2016, Brito played for the rookie-level Princeton Rays, registering a 3–0 record and 4.00 ERA with 27 strikeouts in 15 appearances. He did not play in a game in 2017 and allowed two runs in 2/3 of an inning for the GCL Rays in 2018 before being released on June 22, 2018.

=== Chunichi Dragons ===
In 2019, Brito was invited to a try-out with a view to signing on a permanent basis with the Chunichi Dragons of Nippon Professional Baseball (NPB) and was signed to a development player deal on 22 February. Brito's first year for the Dragons was restricted to the farm where he struggled for control and pitched 6 1/3 innings for a 10.80 ERA. Brito's struggles continued in 2020 for the farm team, as he recorded a ghastly 15.00 ERA in 4 appearances. He was released after the season on December 2, 2020.
