= La Cueva, Dominican Republic =

La Cueva
- Interactive map of La Cueva
- Country: Dominican Republic
- Province: Sánchez Ramírez
- Municipality: Cevicos

Population (2002)
  - Total: 5,514
  - Urban: 3,286

La Cueva is a Dominican village, municipal district of Cevicos, in the Sánchez Ramírez Province. It was founded in that category by Law No. 87, on December 26, 1979. It is made up of the communities; Sabana Grande, Los Peralejos and El Pozo de la Ceiba. It has a population of more than five thousand.

== Sources ==
- – World-Gazetteer.com
