= Majagual =

Majagual may refer to:

- Majagual, Dominican Republic, a town in Monte Plata province, Dominican Republic
- Majagual, Sucre, in Sucre department, Colombia
