= Peralvillo =

Peralvillo Esperalvillo
- Municipality
- Location within the Dominican Republic
- Coordinates: 18°49′12″N 70°01′48″W
- Country: Dominican Republic
- Province: Monte Plata
- Established as a Municipality: June 16, 2004

Area
  - Total: 153.35 km^{2} (59.21 sq mi)

Population (2012)
  - Total: 20,048
  - Density: 130.73/km^{2} (338.60/sq mi)

Peralvillo is a municipality (municipio) of the Monte Plata province in the Dominican Republic. It is also known as Esperalvillo.
