= Bayaguana =

- Municipality
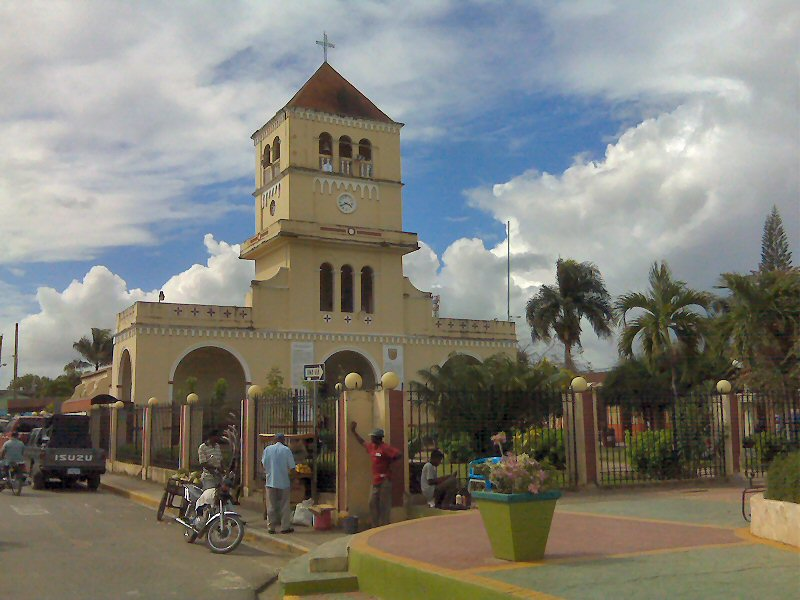
- Church

- Location within the Dominican Republic
- Coordinates: 18°45′N 69°38′W
- Country: Dominican Republic
- Province: Monte Plata
- Founded: 1606

Area
  - Total: 877.99 km^{2} (338.99 sq mi)
- Elevation: 61 m (200 ft)

Population (2012)
  - Total: 34,786
  - Density: 39.620/km^{2} (102.62/sq mi)
  - Urban: 19,001
  - Rural: 15,785
- Municipal Districts: 0
- Distance to – Monte Plata: 21 km

Bayaguana is a municipality (municipio) of the Monte Plata province in the Dominican Republic.

As of the Dominican Republic's 2002 census, the municipality had a total population of 34,786 inhabitants, of which 19,001 resided in urban areas and 15,785 in rural areas.

== History ==
Bayaguana was founded in 1606, when Spain resettled colonists from the northern and western part of Hispaniola closer to Santo Domingo, under the government eviction programme known as the devastations of Osorio. Spanish colonists from La Yaguana and Bayajá (present-day Léogâne and Fort-Liberté, Haiti) were resettled in the town. The economy is centered on cattle-ranching and pineapple and rice farming.

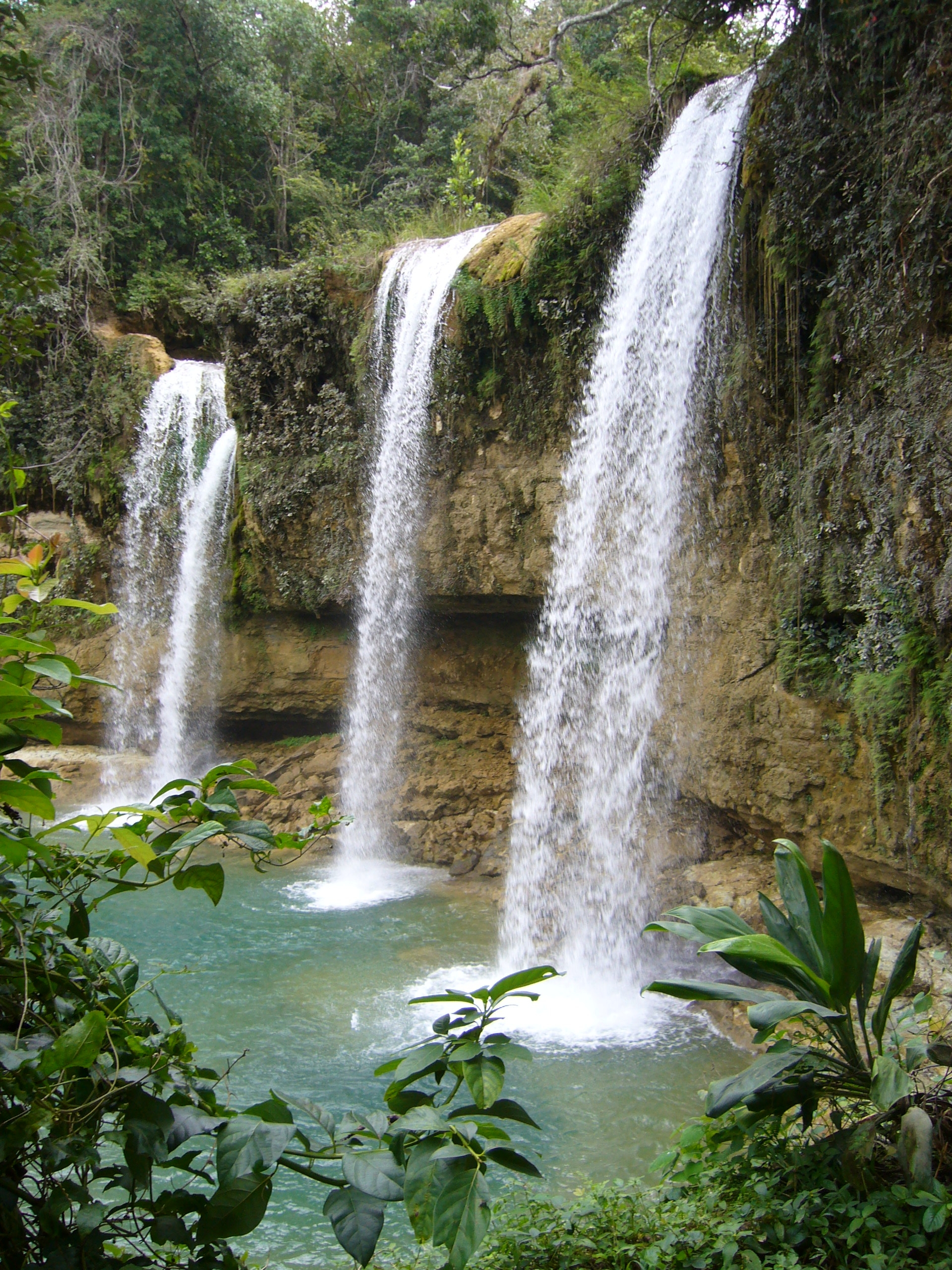
Waterfall in Bayaguana, Monte Plata province

== Economy ==
It operates the agricultural line, as well as part of its land is sown with sugar cane, pineapple and natural pastures for food for the cattle that it has in abundance.

A site of great tourist attraction is located near the town of Bayaguana. It is the Salto de Comate, in the river of the same name, where hundreds of people flock every day to enjoy a bath in its cold waters. There are also the spas of Comatillo, in Comatillo, Salto Alto, in Sierra de Agua, among others. In turn, part of one of the main national parks, Los Haitises National Park, is located in Bayaguana.

== Climate ==
Climate data for Bayaguana (1991–2020)
Month	Jan	Feb	Mar	Apr	May	Jun	Jul	Aug	Sep	Oct	Nov	Dec	Year
Mean daily maximum °C (°F)	30.0 (86.0)	30.6 (87.1)	31.2 (88.2)	31.7 (89.1)	31.6 (88.9)	32.6 (90.7)	32.9 (91.2)	32.8 (91.0)	32.7 (90.9)	32.2 (90.0)	31.1 (88.0)	30.3 (86.5)	31.6 (88.9)
Daily mean °C (°F)	24.4 (75.9)	24.7 (76.5)	25.3 (77.5)	26.1 (79.0)	26.8 (80.2)	27.6 (81.7)	27.8 (82.0)	27.8 (82.0)	27.6 (81.7)	27.2 (81.0)	26.1 (79.0)	24.9 (76.8)	26.3 (79.3)
Mean daily minimum °C (°F)	18.7 (65.7)	18.8 (65.8)	19.3 (66.7)	20.6 (69.1)	21.9 (71.4)	22.6 (72.7)	22.8 (73.0)	22.7 (72.9)	22.5 (72.5)	22.2 (72.0)	21.1 (70.0)	19.5 (67.1)	21.1 (70.0)
Average precipitation mm (inches)	60.6 (2.39)	58.2 (2.29)	73.6 (2.90)	161.3 (6.35)	255.6 (10.06)	190.6 (7.50)	212.2 (8.35)	253.8 (9.99)	218.3 (8.59)	193.3 (7.61)	105.2 (4.14)	58.4 (2.30)	1,841.2 (72.49)
Source: National Oceanic and Atmospheric Administration

Climate data for Bayaguana (1971–2000)
Month	Jan	Feb	Mar	Apr	May	Jun	Jul	Aug	Sep	Oct	Nov	Dec	Year
Record high °C (°F)	33.5 (92.3)	34.0 (93.2)	36.5 (97.7)	36.5 (97.7)	36.0 (96.8)	36.0 (96.8)	35.6 (96.1)	39.5 (103.1)	35.6 (96.1)	35.5 (95.9)	35.0 (95.0)	35.5 (95.9)	39.5 (103.1)
Mean daily maximum °C (°F)	27.2 (81.0)	27.5 (81.5)	28.2 (82.8)	28.7 (83.7)	28.9 (84.0)	29.4 (84.9)	29.6 (85.3)	29.6 (85.3)	29.5 (85.1)	29.2 (84.6)	28.4 (83.1)	27.3 (81.1)	28.6 (83.5)
Daily mean °C (°F)	24.1 (75.4)	24.3 (75.7)	24.9 (76.8)	25.6 (78.1)	26.3 (79.3)	27.0 (80.6)	27.1 (80.8)	27.0 (80.6)	27.0 (80.6)	26.6 (79.9)	25.8 (78.4)	24.5 (76.1)	25.9 (78.5)
Mean daily minimum °C (°F)	18.7 (65.7)	18.7 (65.7)	19.1 (66.4)	20.1 (68.2)	21.3 (70.3)	22.1 (71.8)	22.0 (71.6)	22.0 (71.6)	21.9 (71.4)	21.5 (70.7)	20.8 (69.4)	19.4 (66.9)	20.6 (69.1)
Record low °C (°F)	14.0 (57.2)	12.5 (54.5)	13.2 (55.8)	14.0 (57.2)	14.6 (58.3)	19.0 (66.2)	19.0 (66.2)	18.0 (64.4)	18.8 (65.8)	17.7 (63.9)	16.1 (61.0)	13.4 (56.1)	12.5 (54.5)
Average rainfall mm (inches)	58.5 (2.30)	71.3 (2.81)	82.5 (3.25)	134.4 (5.29)	253.5 (9.98)	196.4 (7.73)	208.8 (8.22)	267.8 (10.54)	241.7 (9.52)	194.9 (7.67)	114.0 (4.49)	59.4 (2.34)	1,883.2 (74.14)
Average rainy days (≥ 1.0 mm)	7.3	7.2	7.0	10.1	13.9	13.1	14.4	16.4	16.2	14.7	10.9	8.2	139.4
Average relative humidity (%)	77.7	74.9	73.1	75.1	79.2	79.1	79.3	81.3	82.4	82.7	81.2	79.2	78.8
Source: ONAMET

Climate data for Bayaguana (1961–1990)
Month	Jan	Feb	Mar	Apr	May	Jun	Jul	Aug	Sep	Oct	Nov	Dec	Year
Record high °C (°F)	36.0 (96.8)	35.5 (95.9)	36.5 (97.7)	36.5 (97.7)	37.0 (98.6)	37.5 (99.5)	37.5 (99.5)	39.5 (103.1)	37.5 (99.5)	37.0 (98.6)	36.0 (96.8)	37.8 (100.0)	39.5 (103.1)
Mean daily maximum °C (°F)	30.1 (86.2)	30.6 (87.1)	31.5 (88.7)	31.8 (89.2)	32.2 (90.0)	32.6 (90.7)	32.7 (90.9)	32.7 (90.9)	32.7 (90.9)	32.4 (90.3)	31.5 (88.7)	30.1 (86.2)	31.7 (89.1)
Daily mean °C (°F)	24.7 (76.5)	24.9 (76.8)	25.6 (78.1)	26.2 (79.2)	27.0 (80.6)	27.5 (81.5)	27.6 (81.7)	27.6 (81.7)	27.6 (81.7)	27.2 (81.0)	26.4 (79.5)	25.0 (77.0)	26.4 (79.5)
Mean daily minimum °C (°F)	19.3 (66.7)	19.3 (66.7)	19.7 (67.5)	20.6 (69.1)	21.8 (71.2)	22.5 (72.5)	22.6 (72.7)	22.5 (72.5)	22.5 (72.5)	22.1 (71.8)	21.3 (70.3)	19.9 (67.8)	21.2 (70.2)
Record low °C (°F)	14.0 (57.2)	12.5 (54.5)	13.2 (55.8)	14.0 (57.2)	14.6 (58.3)	19.0 (66.2)	18.0 (64.4)	18.0 (64.4)	18.8 (65.8)	17.7 (63.9)	16.1 (61.0)	13.4 (56.1)	12.5 (54.5)
Average rainfall mm (inches)	45.4 (1.79)	61.1 (2.41)	78.8 (3.10)	126.8 (4.99)	232.0 (9.13)	229.6 (9.04)	227.3 (8.95)	281.4 (11.08)	217.6 (8.57)	200.8 (7.91)	117.0 (4.61)	58.3 (2.30)	1,876.1 (73.86)
Average rainy days (≥ 1.0 mm)	6.1	6.0	6.3	8.1	13.5	14.2	14.2	16.2	15.5	15.4	9.7	7.2	132.4
Average relative humidity (%)	77.5	74.6	73.2	74.9	78.8	79.3	79.4	81.3	82.3	82.8	81.1	79.2	78.7
Source: NOAA
