= Chirinos =

Chirinos is a Spanish surname. Notable people with the surname include:

- Arsenio Chirinos (1934–2015), Venezuelan cyclist
- Benigno Chirinos (born 1950), Peruvian labor union leader and politician
- Edmundo Chirinos (1935–2013), Venezuelan psychiatrist, academic, politician, and convicted murderer
- Eduardo Chirinos (1960–2016), Peruvian writer and poet
- Javier Chirinos (born 1960), Peruvian footballer and manager
- Juan Carlos Chirinos (born 1967), Venezuelan writer
- Mario Chirinos (born 1978), Honduran footballer
- Manuel Bonilla Chirinos (1849–1913), Honduran general
- Michaell Chirinos (born 1995), Honduran professional footballer
- Patricia Chirinos (born 1975), Peruvian journalist and politician
- Patricio Chirinos Calero (born 1937), Mexican politician
- Robinson Chirinos (born 1984), Venezuelan profession baseball catcher
- Víctor Chirinos (born 1941), Venezuelan cyclist
- Yonny Chirinos (born 1993), Venezuelan professional baseball pitcher

== See also ==
- Chirino, another surname
