= La Mata, Dominican Republic =

Coordinates: 19°06′00″N 70°10′05″W

La Mata
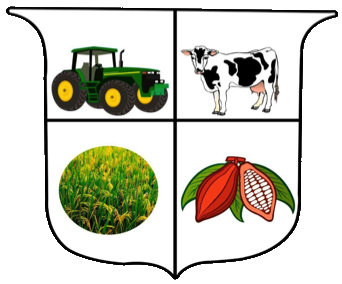
- Coat of arms
- Interactive map of La Mata
- Country: Dominican Republic
- Province: Sánchez Ramírez
- Established as a Municipality: August 7, 2002

Area
  - Total: 174.64 km^{2} (67.43 sq mi)

Population (2012)
  - Total: 42,785
  - Density: 244.99/km^{2} (634.52/sq mi)

La Mata is a town in the Sánchez Ramírez province of the Dominican Republic.

== Sources ==
- – World-Gazetteer.com
