= Hatillo Dam =

- Location within the Dominican Republic
- Official name: Presa Hatillo
- Country: Dominican Republic
- Location: Cotuí, Sánchez Ramírez Province
- Coordinates: 19°02′00.91″N 70°12′01.49″W
- Purpose: Power, irrigation, flood control
- Status: Operational
- Construction began: 1977
- Opening date: 1984; 42 years ago
- Owner: Dominican Hydroelectric Generation Company

Dam and spillways
- Type of dam: Embankment, earth and rock-fill
- Impounds: Yuna River
- Height: 60 m (200 ft)
- Length: 1,800 m (5,900 ft)
- Dam volume: 11,500,000 m^{3} (15,000,000 cu yd)
- Spillway type: Controlled chute
- Spillway capacity: 650 m^{3}/s (23,000 cu ft/s)

Reservoir
- Total capacity: 710,000,000 m^{3} (580,000 acre⋅ft)
- Catchment area: 5,235 km^{2} (2,021 mi^{2})
- Surface area: 22 km^{2} (8.5 mi^{2})
- Maximum length: 15 m (49 ft)
- Normal elevation: 86.5 m (284 ft)

Hatillo Hydroelectric Station
- Commission date: 1984
- Turbines: 1 x 8 MW Francis-type
- Installed capacity: 8 MW

The Hatillo Dam is an earth and rock-filled embankment dam on the Yuna River about 6 km (3.7 mi) southwest of Cotuí in Sánchez Ramírez Province of the Dominican Republic. With a storage capacity of 710,000,000 m^{3} (580,000 acre⋅ft), the dam's reservoir is the largest in the country. The purpose of the dam is to produce hydroelectric power, provide water for irrigation and to control floods. The power station is located at the base of the dam and contains a single 8 MW Francis turbine-generator. Construction on the dam began in August 1977 and it was completed in 1984.

== See also ==
- List of dams and reservoirs in Dominican Republic
