= César Hernández (outfielder) =

Dominican baseball player (born 1966)

- Outfielder
- Born: September 28, 1966 (age 59); Yamasa, Dominican Republic
- Batted: Right Threw: Right

MLB debut
- July 19, 1992, for the Cincinnati Reds

Last MLB appearance
- May 17, 1993, for the Cincinnati Reds

MLB statistics
- Batting average: .213
- Home runs: 0
- Runs batted in: 5

CPBL statistics
- Batting average: .310
- Home runs: 36
- Runs batted in: 179
- Stats at Baseball Reference

Teams
- Cincinnati Reds (1992–1993); Uni-President Lions (1995–1998)

Career highlights and awards
- 2x Taiwan Series champion (1995–1996)

César Dario Pérez Hernández (born September 28, 1966) is a Dominican former Major League Baseball (MLB) outfielder who played 61 games for the Cincinnati Reds in 1992 and 1993, mostly in left field.

== Career ==
He was drafted by the Montreal Expos in the first round of the 1985 amateur draft (Dominican Draft), and in 1991, the Reds selected him off the waiver wire.

He made his major league debut on July 19, 1992, as a pinch hitter for Chris Hammond against the St. Louis Cardinals. His final game came on May 17, 1993, as a defensive replacement in left field against the Los Angeles Dodgers. After his major league career, Hernández went on to play with the Pittsburgh Pirates minor league system, Leones de Yucatán and Piratas de Campeche of the Mexican League, and the Uni-President Lions of the Chinese Professional Baseball League.
