= Pressure oxidation =

Process for extracting gold from refractory ore

Pressure oxidation is a process for extracting gold from refractory ore.

The most common refractory ores are pyrite and arsenopyrite, which are sulfide ores that trap the gold within them. Refractory ores require pre-treatment before the gold can be adequately extracted. The pressure oxidation process is used to prepare such ores for conventional gold extraction processes such as cyanidation. It is performed in an autoclave at high pressure and temperature, where high-purity oxygen mixes with a slurry of ore.

When the original sulfide minerals are oxidized at high temperature and pressure, it completely releases the trapped gold. Pressure oxidation has a very high gold recovery rate, normally at least 10% higher than roasting.

The oxidation of the iron sulfide minerals produces sulfuric acid, soluble compounds such as ferric sulfate, and solids such as iron sulfate or jarosite. The iron-based solids produced pose an environmental challenge, as they can release acid and heavy metals to the environment. They can also make later precious metal recovery more difficult. Arsenic in the ore is converted to solid scorodite inside the autoclave, allowing it to be easily disposed of. This is an advantage over processes such as roasting where these toxic products are released as gases.

A disadvantage of pressure oxidation is that any silver in the feed material will often react to form silver jarosite inside the autoclave, making it difficult and expensive to recover the silver.

An example of a mine utilizing this technology is the Pueblo Viejo mine in the Dominican Republic. At Pueblo Viejo, the process is performed by injecting high-purity oxygen into autoclaves operating at 230 degrees C and 40 bar of pressure. The resulting chemical reactions oxidizes the sulfide minerals the gold is trapped within. The oxidation of pyrite is highly exothermic, allowing the autoclave to operate at this temperature without an external heat source.
