= San Luis, Dominican Republic =

San Luis
- San Luis in the Dominican Republic
- Coordinates: 18°33′0″N 69°42′0″W
- Country: Dominican Republic
- Province: Santo Domingo
- Establishment: March 5, 2004

Area
  - Total: 45.9 km^{2} (17.7 sq mi)

Population (2010)
  - Total: 56,933
  - Density: 1,240/km^{2} (3,210/sq mi)

San Luis is a municipal district of the Santo Domingo province in the Dominican Republic.

As of the 2010 census, San Luis had 56,933 inhabitants.

== History ==
The origins of San Luis are linked to the development of the sugar industry and date back to the end of the 1850s, with the arrival of the Cambiazo brothers (one of whom was named Luis) to this community which they named San Luis. 1881, the Cambiazo brothers installed a sugar mill. Later, the Catholic Church attributed the name to Saint Louis, King of France. 1895, the sugar mill passed to the Michelene family and remained so until the first years of the Trujillo era when it was transferred to The Royal Bank of Canada. By 1953, Trujillo bought the sugar mill. With the death of the dictator in 1961, all his enterprises and companies became State property.

In 2004, San Luis was elevated to the category of Municipal District, made up of the sections San Isidro and El Naranjo and the villages of Cabreto and El Bonito.

With a population of around 70,000 inhabitants, San Luis currently has 18 neighbourhoods, 11 public and private educational centres, and a Community College. San Luis also is the seat of the Batalla de las Carreras Military Academy and of the Dominican Air Force.
