= Sabana Grande de Boyá =

- Municipality
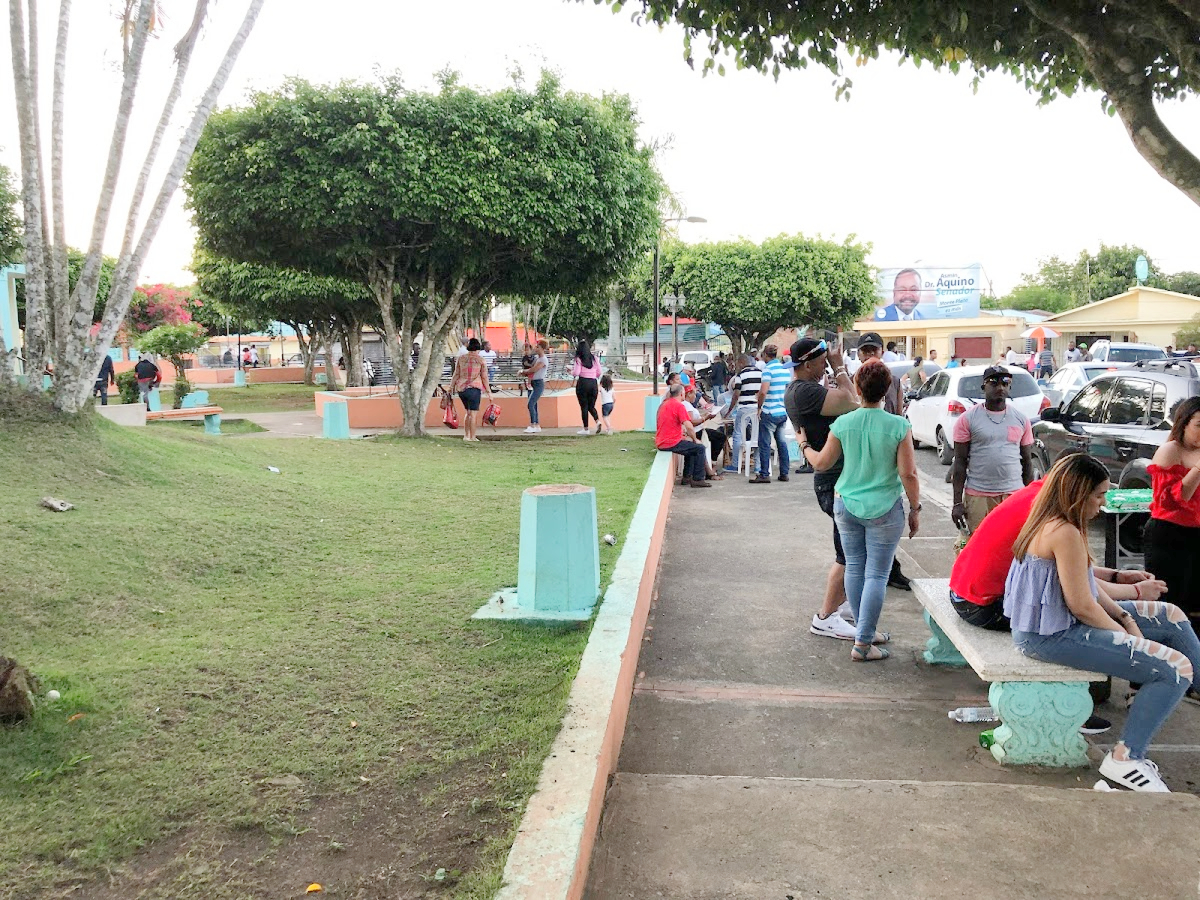
- Sabana Grande de Boya Dominican Republic

- Location within the Dominican Republic
- Coordinates: 18°57′0″N 69°48′0″W
- Country: Dominican Republic
- Province: Monte Plata

Area
  - Total: 535.08 km^{2} (206.60 sq mi)

Population (2012)
  - Total: 30,085
  - Density: 56.225/km^{2} (145.62/sq mi)
- Municipal Districts: 2

Sabana Grande de Boyá is a municipality (municipio) of the Monte Plata province in the Dominican Republic. It includes the municipal districts (distritos municipal) of Gonzalo and Majagual.

== History ==
It was founded by Enrique Bejo (Enriquillo), the Taino chief of Jaragua and hero of Bahoruco, after 14 years of struggle. Having managed to force the authorities of Santo Domingo to sign a peace treaty, he decided to retire to Boyá in 1533, where he later died. His remains are at the point where a temple was later built.

The last Tainos on the island were exterminated in the town of Boyá and, therefore, it has been called the "last redoubt of the indigenous race" of Santo Domingo. By the late 16th century, the population was made up of only 13 Spanish families and was mostly forgotten.

The town experienced its greatest population growth during the 1940s, a time when the sowing, cultivation and harvesting of sugar cane also began, an activity directed by the then president of the Dominican Republic, the tyrant Rafael Leonidas Trujillo. The sugarcane production attracted a large number of families from different parts of the country as well as other parts of the Caribbean, and settled in these properties in search of a better income.

Sabana Grande de Boya is the hometown of MLB players Elly De La Cruz and José Siri.

== Economy ==
The economy of the town is based on livestock, agriculture and remittances received from abroad, specifically from the United States and Europe.

== Notable residents ==
- Elly De La Cruz (born 2002), infielder for the Cincinnati Reds of Major League Baseball
- José Siri (born 1995), outfielder for the Los Angeles Angels of Major League Baseball

== Gallery ==
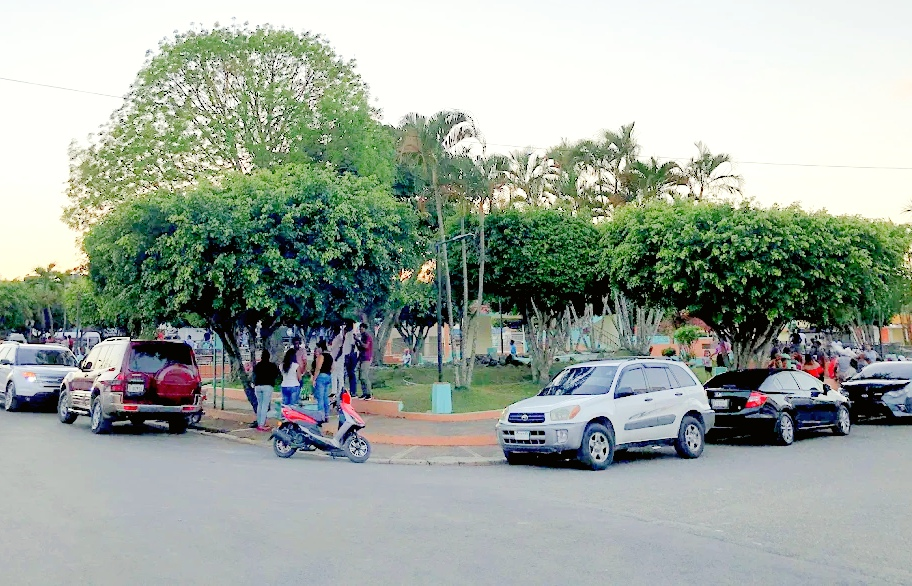

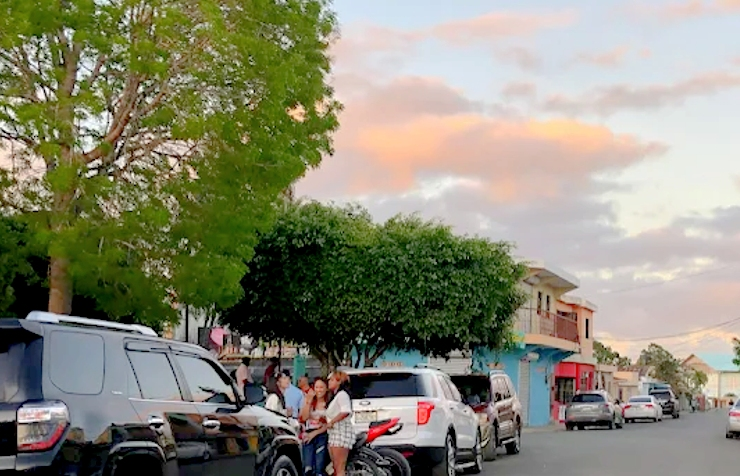

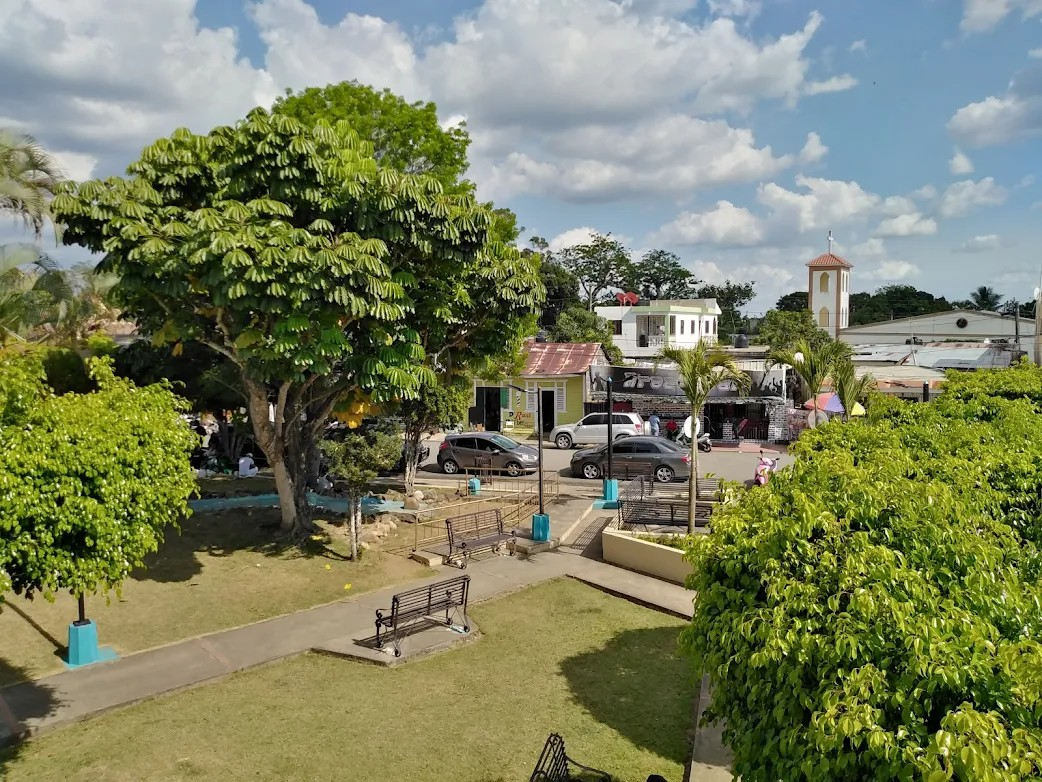
