= Los Botados =

- Location within the Dominican Republic
- Coordinates: 18°43′48″N 70°0′0″W
- Country: Dominican Republic
- Province: Monte Plata

Population (2008)
  - Total: 4,227

Los Botados is a town in the Monte Plata province of the Dominican Republic.

== Sources ==
- – World-Gazetteer.com
