= Gonzalo, Dominican Republic =

Human settlement in the Dominican Republic

Municipio de Gonzalo is a small town in Monte Plata Province, Dominican Republic. The population as of the 2022 census was 5,954. The main source of income is cattle ranching and agriculture.
