= Yamasá =

- Municipality
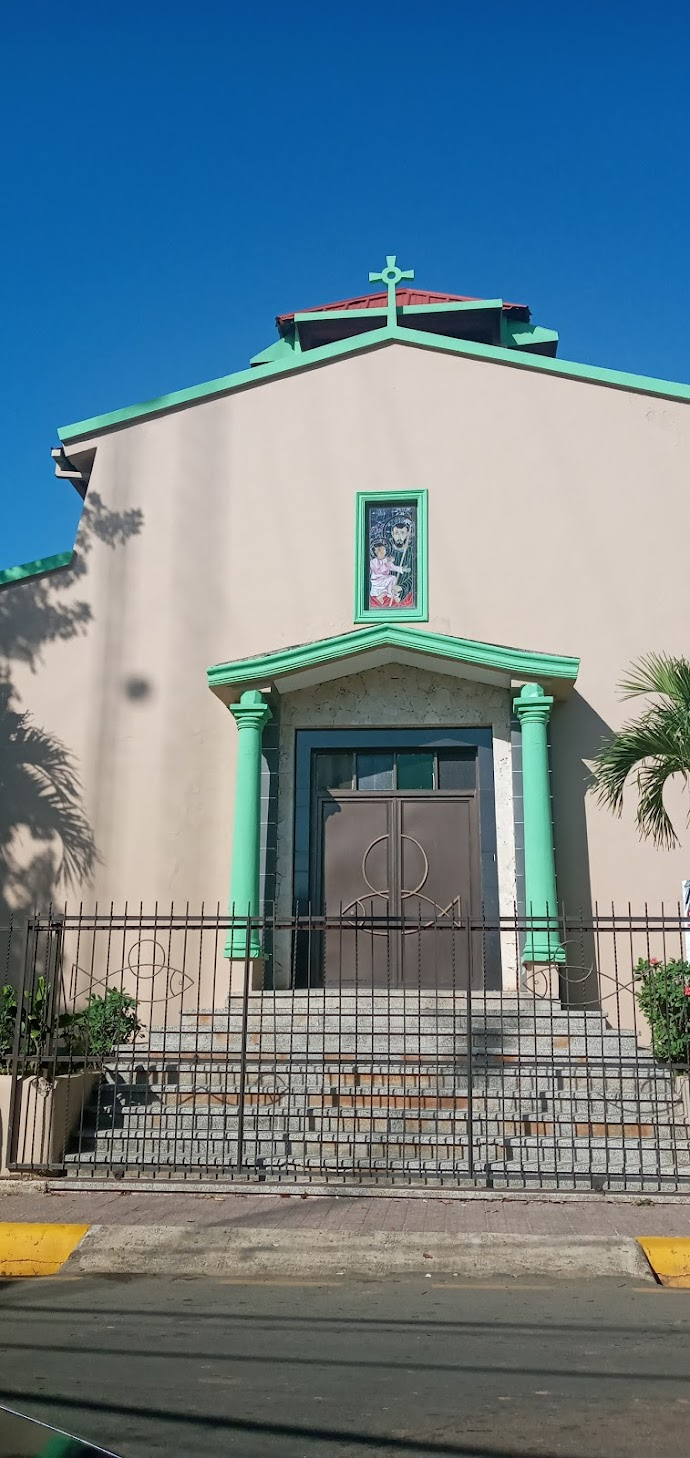

- Location within the Dominican Republic
- Coordinates: 18°46′N 70°01′W
- Country: Dominican Republic
- Province: Monte Plata

Area
  - Total: 441.61 km^{2} (170.51 sq mi)
- Elevation: 82 m (269 ft)

Population (2012)
  - Total: 57,982
  - Density: 131.30/km^{2} (340.06/sq mi)
- Municipal Districts: 1
- Distance to – Santo Domingo: 42 km (26 mi)

Yamasá is a municipality (municipio) of the Monte Plata province in the Dominican Republic. It includes the municipal district (distrito municipal) of Los Botados. Yamasa is north of the capital city of Santo Domingo. The Rio Ozama, one of Dominican Republic's longest rivers, passes through Yamasa.

== Climate ==
Climate data for Yamasá (1961–1990)
Month	Jan	Feb	Mar	Apr	May	Jun	Jul	Aug	Sep	Oct	Nov	Dec	Year
Record high °C (°F)	35.0 (95.0)	37.7 (99.9)	36.7 (98.1)	37.9 (100.2)	38.7 (101.7)	39.6 (103.3)	39.4 (102.9)	38.4 (101.1)	38.4 (101.1)	38.8 (101.8)	37.0 (98.6)	34.6 (94.3)	39.6 (103.3)
Mean daily maximum °C (°F)	29.5 (85.1)	30.3 (86.5)	31.2 (88.2)	32.0 (89.6)	32.6 (90.7)	33.1 (91.6)	33.2 (91.8)	32.9 (91.2)	32.8 (91.0)	32.5 (90.5)	31.1 (88.0)	29.9 (85.8)	31.8 (89.2)
Mean daily minimum °C (°F)	18.9 (66.0)	19.0 (66.2)	19.7 (67.5)	20.2 (68.4)	20.9 (69.6)	21.3 (70.3)	21.5 (70.7)	21.3 (70.3)	21.1 (70.0)	20.8 (69.4)	20.2 (68.4)	19.2 (66.6)	20.3 (68.5)
Record low °C (°F)	13.2 (55.8)	13.7 (56.7)	13.5 (56.3)	13.5 (56.3)	15.5 (59.9)	16.2 (61.2)	16.3 (61.3)	15.7 (60.3)	15.5 (59.9)	15.3 (59.5)	13.8 (56.8)	10.6 (51.1)	10.6 (51.1)
Average rainfall mm (inches)	90.0 (3.54)	95.1 (3.74)	101.7 (4.00)	161.6 (6.36)	287.4 (11.31)	246.9 (9.72)	255.6 (10.06)	326.6 (12.86)	250.7 (9.87)	245.3 (9.66)	161.4 (6.35)	121.8 (4.80)	2,344.1 (92.29)
Average rainy days (≥ 1.0 mm)	9.6	8.0	7.3	8.9	15.0	14.0	16.5	17.7	15.2	14.7	12.1	10.6	149.6
Source: NOAA

== Farming ==
Primarily a rural agriculture community, sugar cane, plantains and mangoes are common staples grown in Yamasa.

== Famous citizens ==
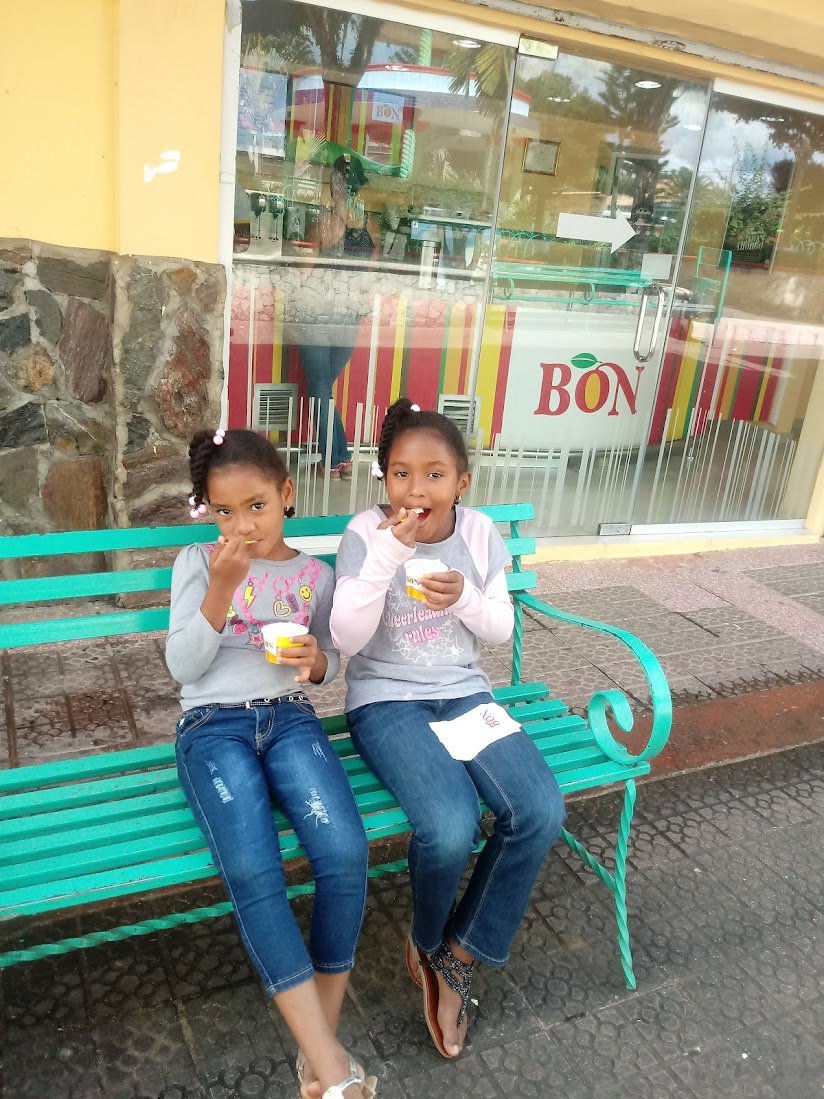
Yamasá, Dominican Republic.

- Camilo Doval (born 1997), baseball relief pitcher for the San Francisco Giants
- Baseball Player César Hernández who played for the Cincinnati Reds was born in Yamasá in 1966.
- Journalist Enny Pichardo An Emmy Award nominee, former Spokesperson/Press Secretary for the NYS Attorney General; and currently Host/Producer of #EnNYConMás, on youtube (www.ennyconmas.tv); previously a national news-correspondent for NBC/Telemundo Network and Noticiero Univisión was born in Yamasá in 1982.
