= Don Juan, Dominican Republic =

Don Juan
- Location within the Dominican Republic
- Coordinates: 18°49′48″N 69°57′0″W
- Country: Dominican Republic
- Province: Monte Plata

Population (2008)
  - Total: 2,498

Don Juan is a town in the Monte Plata province of the Dominican Republic.

== Sources ==
- World Gazeteer: Dominican Republic – World-Gazetteer.com
