= Majagual, Dominican Republic =

Coordinates: 19°02′42″N 69°50′12″W

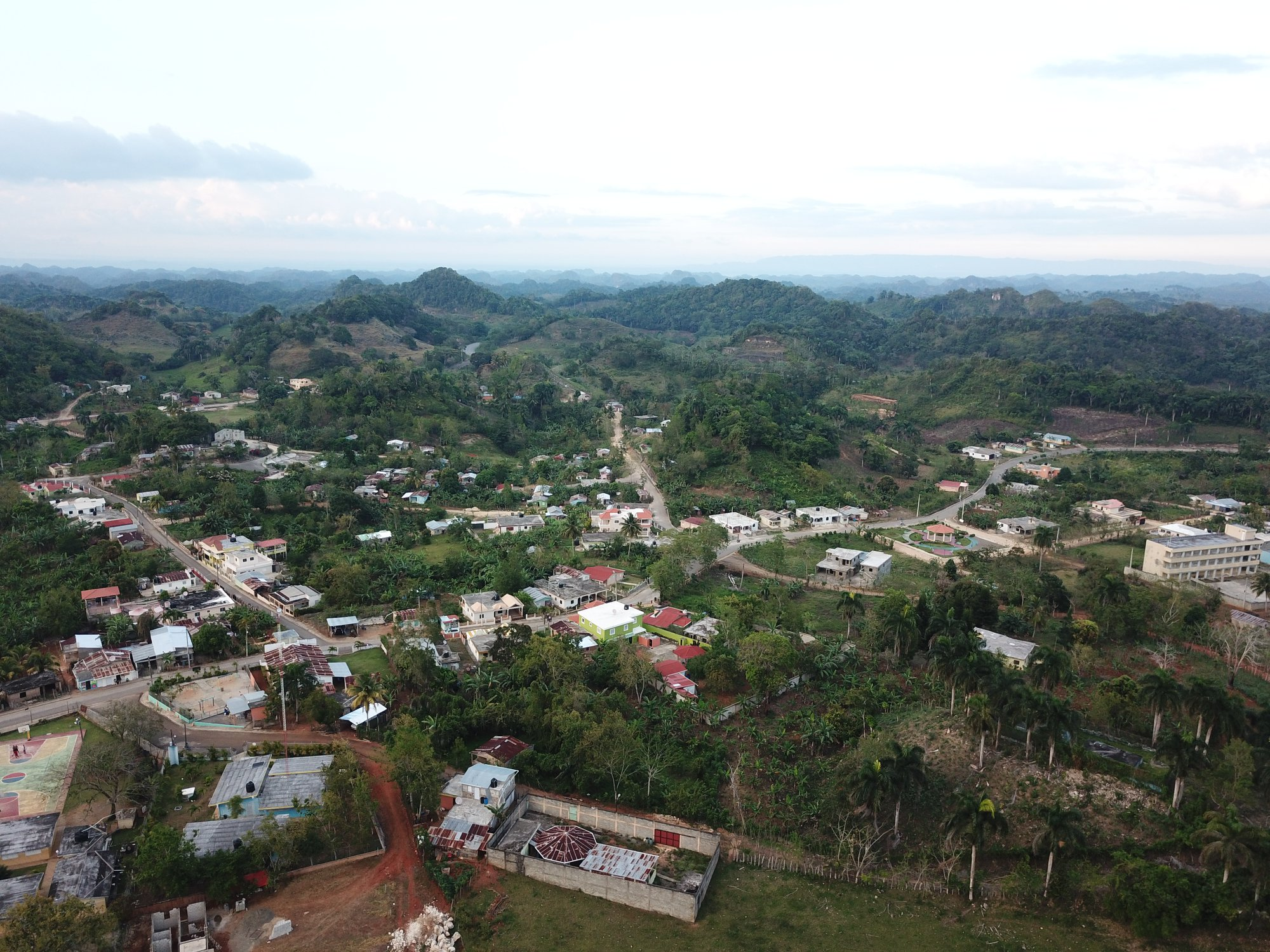
Majagual

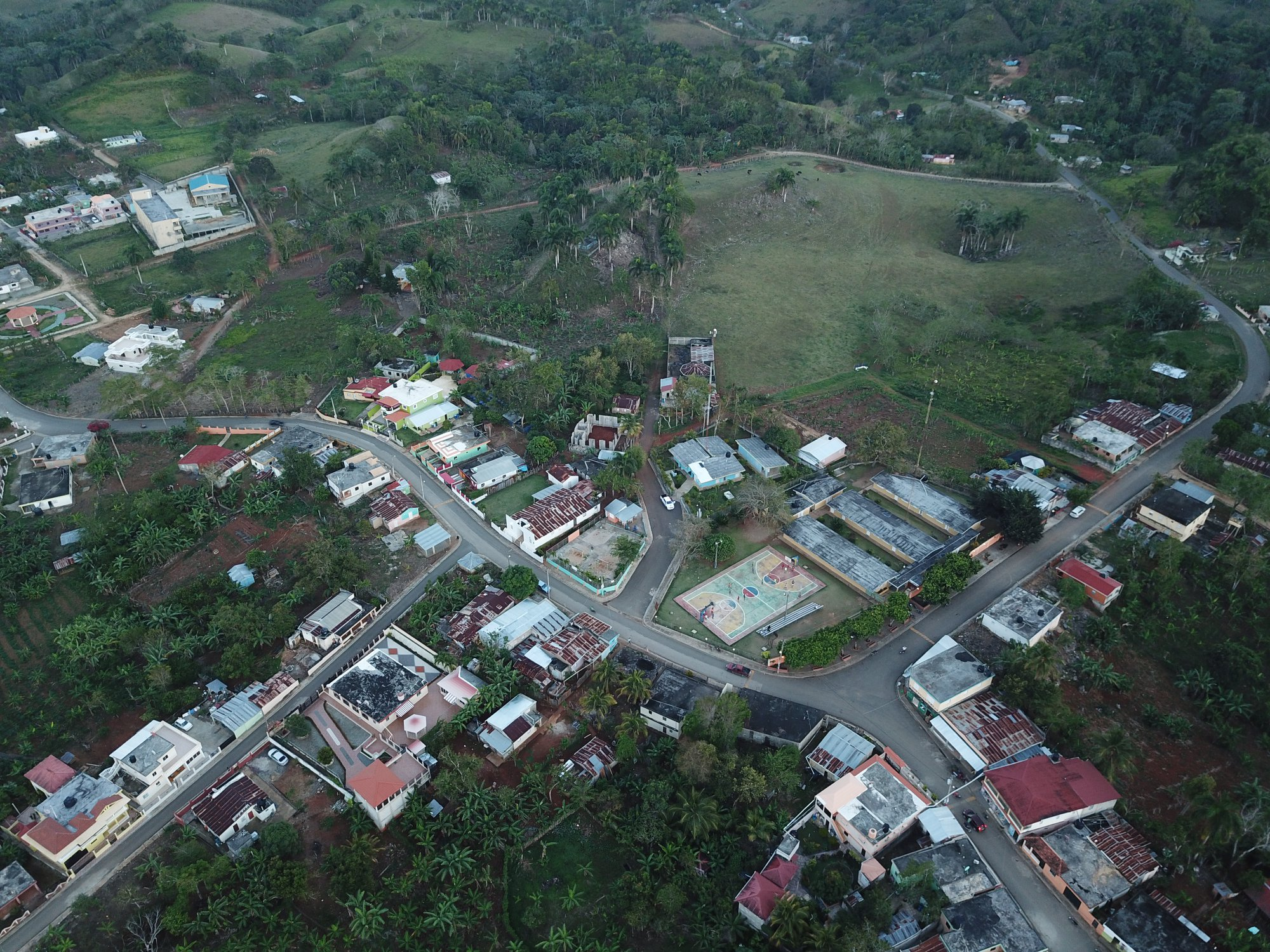
Town of Majagual

Majagual is a small town in the province of Monte Plata, Dominican Republic. The population is approximately 1400.

Many of its residents have immigrated abroad to the US and Europe but they still maintain a strong connection to the town and help the population that remain behind.

Many of the town's young residents attend college in the capital of Santo Domingo, transportation is provided by the local government.

The town is divided into 6 neighborhoods: Sector Deportivo, Higuerito, San Jose, Las Flores, Rinconsolo and El Grillo.

The local economy is based on cattle ranching and dairy products. There used to be a farming communities, but the government took the land from the farmer and convert it into extension of the Haitises national park.

== Infrastructure ==
The town has a clinic, hotel, store, police station, and school.

Highway 7 or Carretera Juan Pablo II crosses this previously inaccessible mountain town, There are dirt road that lead inside the Haitise National Park, which are good for mountain biking and horse riding.

== Nearby ==
Towns near Majagual Municipal District are:

1. La Pista
2. La China
3. Juan Sanchez
4. La Altagracia
5. Piraco
6. La Charca
7. Batey Nuevo
8. Manati
