= Chirino =

Chirino is a surname. Notable people with the surname include:

- José Leonardo Chirino (1754–1796), Spanish colonial revolutionary
- Martín Chirino (1925–2019), Spanish sculptor
- Pedro Chirino (1557–1635), Spanish historian and Jesuit missionary
- Rogelio Chirino (born 1946), Cuban sprint canoeist
- Willy Chirino (born 1947), American singer
- Pedro Almíndez Chirino (fl. 1524–1531), Spanish conquistador

== See also ==
- Chirinos, another surname
