= Cotuí =

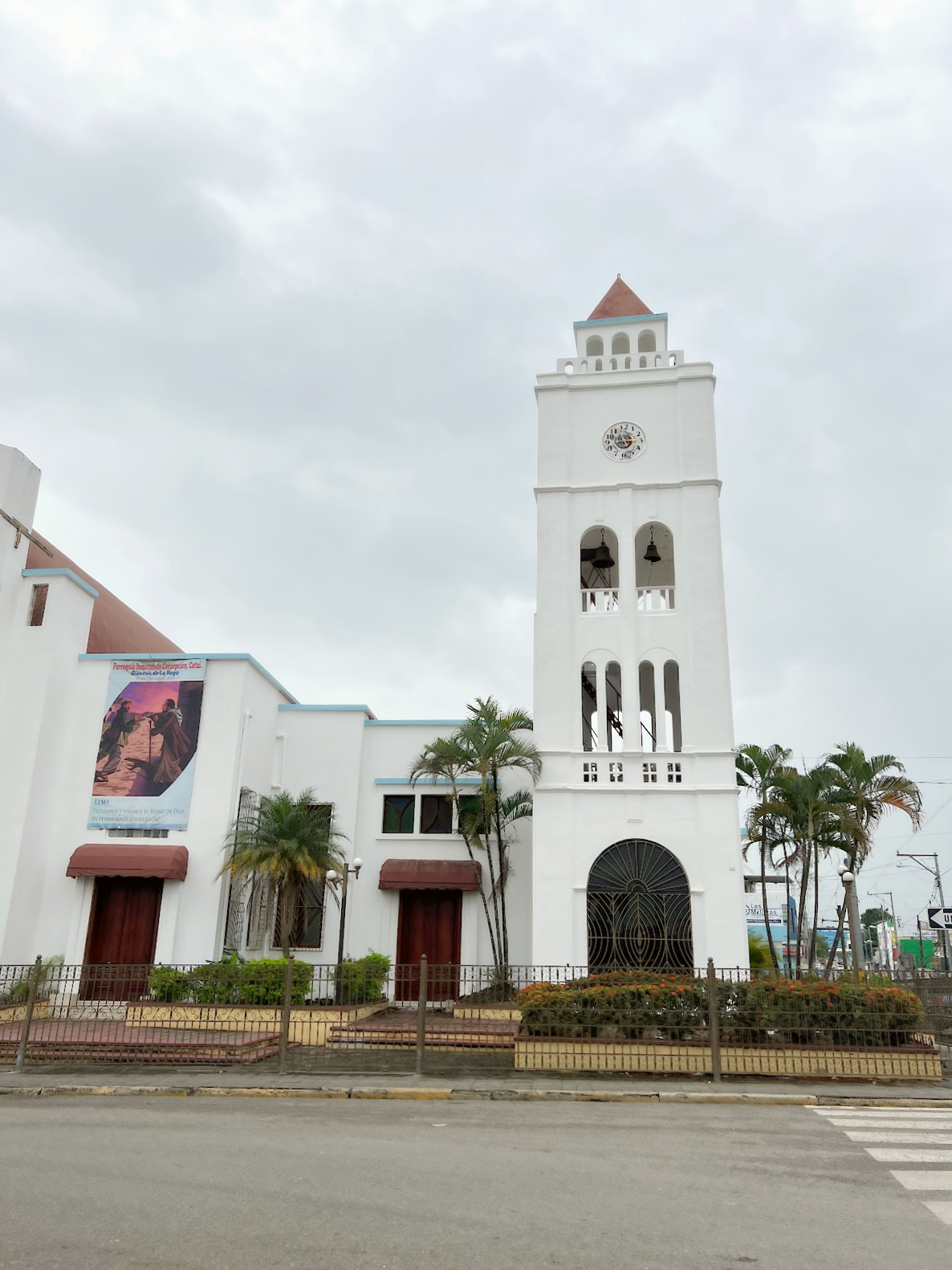
- Cotui Dominican Republic city church

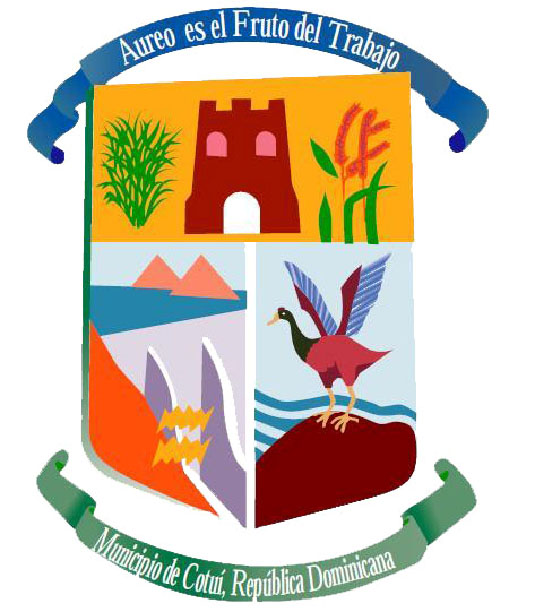
- Coat of arms

- Cotuí in the Dominican Republic
- Coordinates: 19°03′36″N 70°09′0″W
- Country: Dominican Republic
- Province: Sánchez Ramírez
- Founded: 1505
- Municipality since: 1847

Area
  - Total: 619.88 km^{2} (239.34 sq mi)
- Elevation: 66 m (217 ft)

Population (2012)
  - Total: 79,596
  - Density: 128.41/km^{2} (332.57/sq mi)
  - Urban: 48,998
  - Demonym: Cotuisano(a)
- Distance to – Santo Domingo: 105 km
- Municipal Districts: 4
- Climate: Af

Cotuí is a city in the central region of the Dominican Republic and is one of the oldest cities of the New World. It is the capital of Sánchez Ramírez Province in the Cibao.

According to the Population and Housing Census, the municipality had a total urban population of 79,596 inhabitants.

== History ==
It was founded in 1505 by Rodrigo Trillo de Mejía for order of Nicolas de Ovando, who was the governor of Hispaniola. Its name, formerly written Cotuy, was the name of the Taino community located around the gold and silver mines exploited by the Spanish conquerors from the first decade of the 16th century.

=== Early years ===
The total sum of gold extracted during the first two decades of the 16th century in the Spanish Island was estimated at 30,000 kilos, an amount greater than the totality of production in Europe in those years and above the total gold collected by the Portuguese in Africa.

Historian Pedro Mártir de Anglería, in his work Una Decada de Orbe Novo, refers to the mining territory of Cotuí and explains:

There is another region in Hispaniola with the same name Cotuy, which divides the provinces of Unhabo and Cayabo. It has mountains and valleys, there is the origin of the gold, little lumps are not picked up often: solid and pure gold is found in porous stones and between the veins of the rocks: breaking the rocks follows the veins of gold.

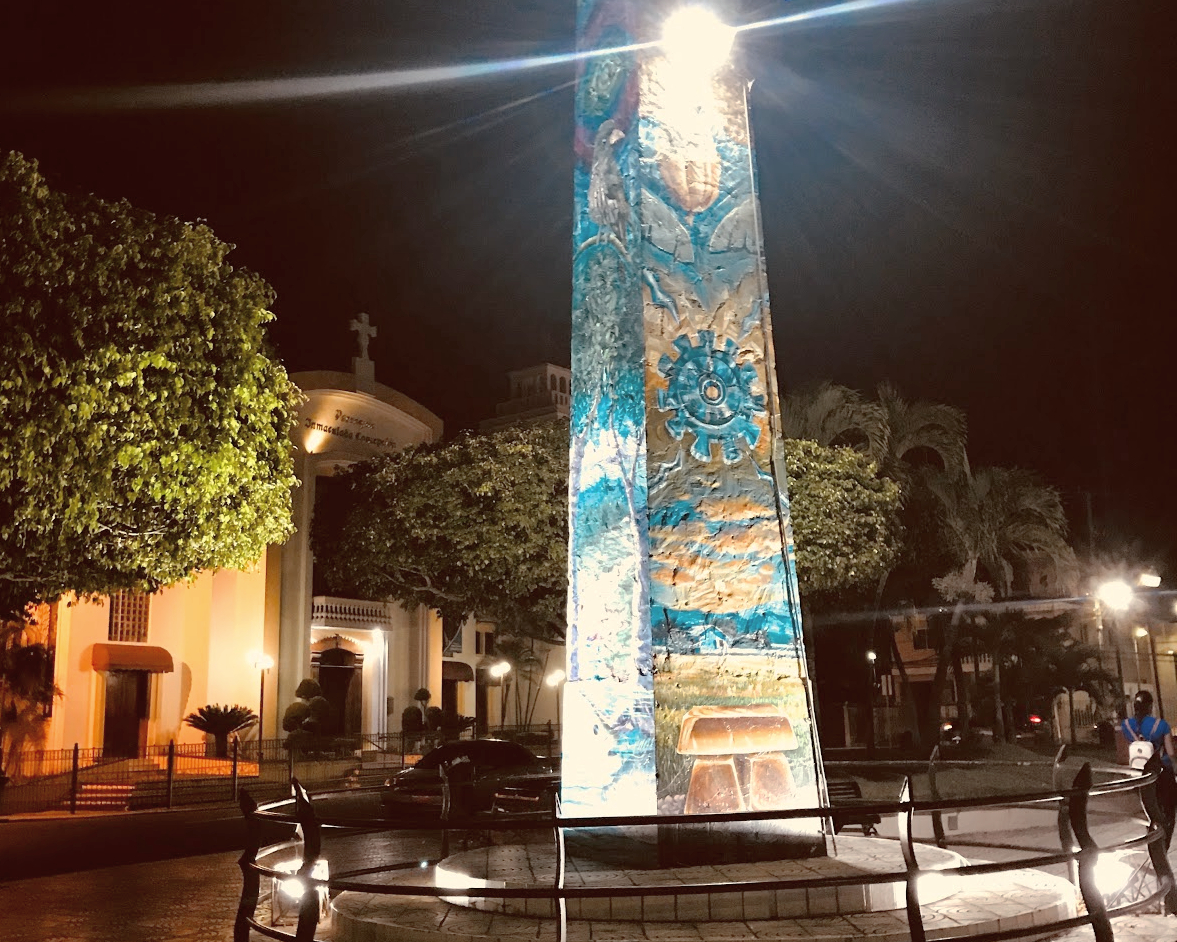
Cotui, Dominican Republic church and obelisk.

In 1533 Cotuí acquired the category of a town, then it began to be known as La Villa Mejorada del Cotuí. Cotui's gold mine was already in production and had become the richest in the New World. In the third decade of the 16th century, the Cotuí gold mine was exploited by a German company of miners, who established an important mining camp at that time. The mine was administered by the Spaniard Francisco Dávila on behalf of the King of Spain through a Mayorazgo. After Francisco Dávila's death in 1554, his will says, among other things, that ten percent of the Cotuí gold mine is for the construction of the church in the town of Aranda de Duero in Spain.

A strong earthquake devastated the town in 1562 and it was moved to its current location, north of the Sierra de Yamasá and close to the Yuna River. In the 17th century the historian Nieto Valcácer carried out a detailed investigation in this place by order of the Spanish monarchy, according to Rincón in his work, he gave the report that he found the ruins of a Spanish city that gave unequivocal signs that a devastating telluric phenomenon had originated, the earthquake that destroyed the city of La Concepción de La Vega in 1562, was the same one that finished destroying La Villa del Cotuí and caused the sinking of the mines.

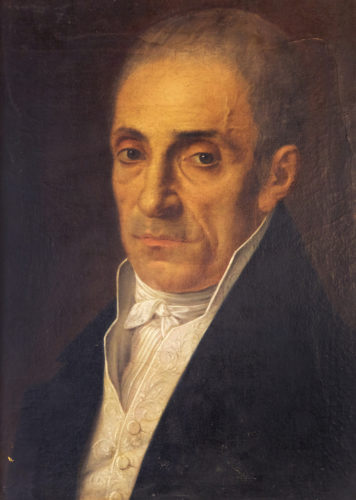
Juan Sánchez Ramírez

In May 1655 Hispaniola was invaded by more than ten thousand English, with the aim of storming the capital and then seizing the entire island. Thirty-seven specialized Cotuisan lancers moved to Santo Domingo to defend the city, their swords wreaked havoc on the invaders to prevent the city of Santo Domingo from being taken over. Cotui was also the birthplace of Juan Sánchez Ramírez known for being the commander in the battle of Palo Hincado on November 7, 1808. Juan Sánchez Ramírez was placed as the leader of the Dominicans to defeat the French in the memorable battle, who under his leadership expelled the French from this territory through the historical struggle called La Reconquista.

=== War of Independence ===
After Juan Pablo Duarte founded the Secret Society La Trinitaria on July 16, 1838, the Cotuisanos organized themselves almost immediately under the batons of Father Puigvert and José Valverde. Cotuí and San Francisco de Macorís became the first towns that dispossessed the Haitians in the town halls, exercising independent municipal power. In January 1844, both Valverde and Puigvert signed the Manifesto of January 16, to let the world, and especially the Haitian authorities, know that the Dominican people were going to war.

After independence was proclaimed, a number of Cotuisanos participated in the different battles that were fought to face the Haitian invasions, since Haiti refused to recognize the independence proclaimed by the Dominican people on February 27, 1844.

=== War of Restoration ===
As soon as the events in Capotillo became known, when Cotuí pronounced himself in favor of the Restoration, hundreds of Cotuisanos went to fight to recover the lost Republic with its annexation to Spain in 1861, those who stood out the most were Esteban Adames, Basilio Gavilán, José Epifanio Márquez, Tomás Castillo and Francisco Suriel, who joined various lines of action, but mainly the Eastern line which had its headquarters in Cotuí, commanded by General Gregorio Luperón.

== Economy ==
The city is well known for its gold, silver, iron, bauxite, marble and nickel mines, its rich soils and the largest artificial lake in the Caribbean, Presa de Hatillo. It is also known for its crystal clear rivers, and its caverns (prehistoric caves called Guácaras). It produces rice, plantains, cacao, pineapples, passion fruits, and yams. Cotui is also the hometown of Mets pitcher Duaner Sánchez, Milwaukee Brewers pitcher José Capellán and Los Angeles Dodger player Teoscar Hernández. Other major towns near Cotuí in Sánchez Ramírez, are Villa La Mata, Fantino, La Cueva and Cevicos.

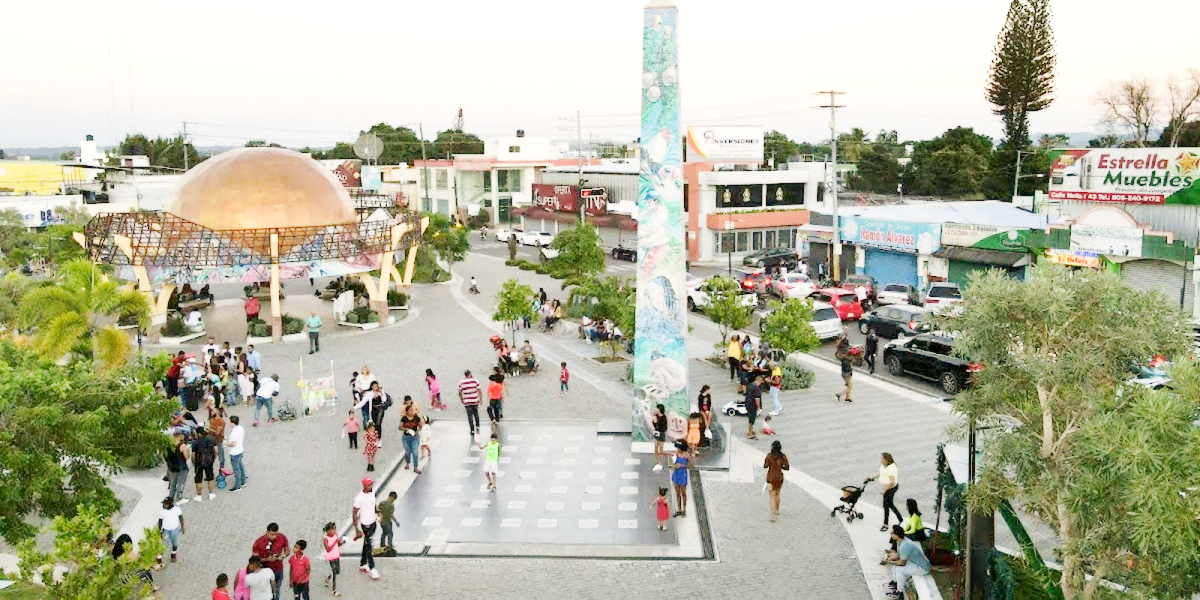

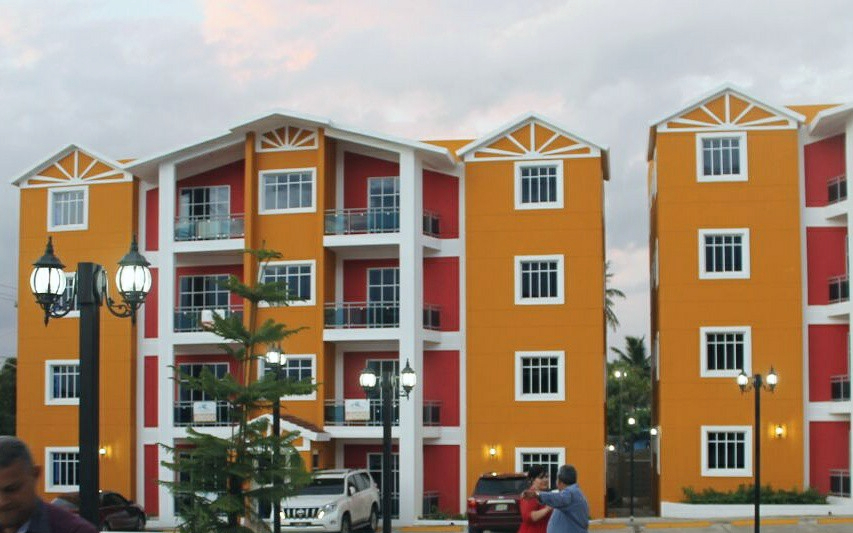

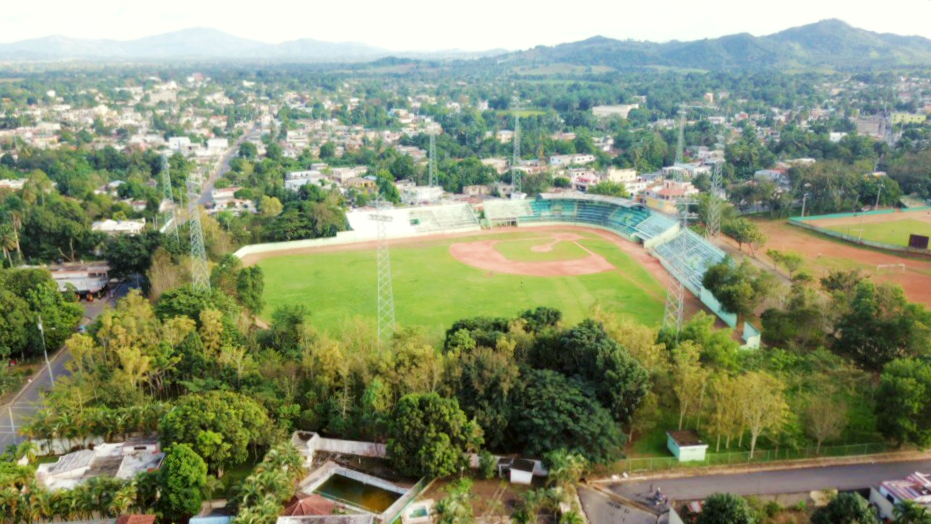

== Culture ==
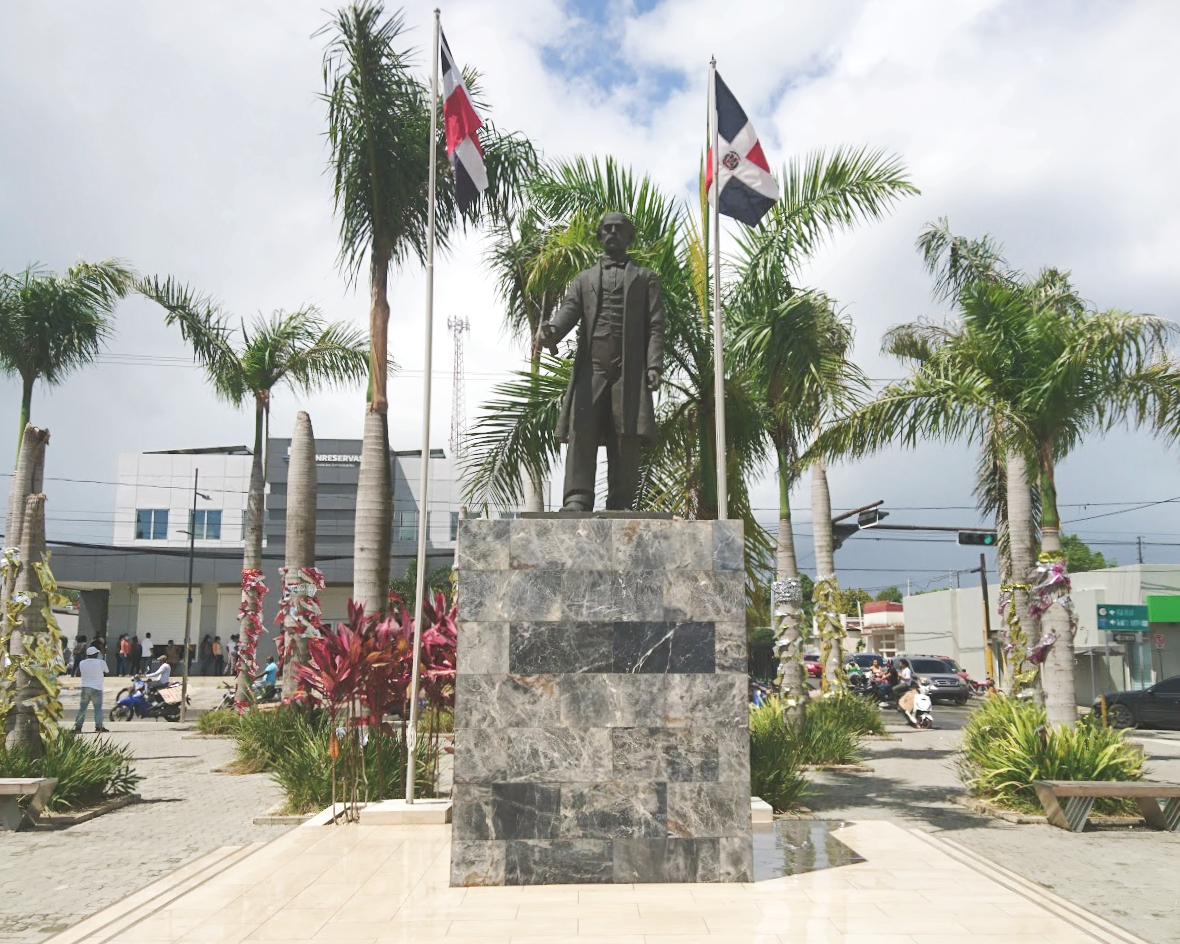
Cotui, Dominican Republic town square.

The Immaculate Conception Church was built in 1741, and was part of the Herrerian-style ecclesiastical monuments that emerged at the beginning of the 17th century, boasting in the portals of the buildings and are associated with the new social impulse that the reign of Carlos V to his former Province of Santo Domingo.

The parochial temple of the municipality was built being priest of the Parish, Mr. Diego Fernández de Castro, it remained for more than 200 years. In 1929 a bell tower was added and when its construction was carried out and the excavations for its base were carried out, the workers found several corpses made into skeletons, which gave a sign that they had been buried in this place for many years. This church was destroyed by an earthquake in 1946. In 1957 the new Immaculate Conception Church was inaugurated, located in front of the central park of the municipality, in the same place where the old one was.

The Cotui carnival, has its origin in Spain, and is also influenced by African culture. Another cultural manifestation of the place is the celebration of the magical religious festival of the Holy Spirit. It is celebrated between the months of May and June of each year, and the organization is called a brotherhood or brotherhood. This celebration is characterized by the playing and singing of the sticks or drums. It is the oldest brotherhood in the New World founded by the clergyman Álvaro de Castro in 1529. Cotui, like all the towns in the country, has its patron saint festivities every year, these festivities are celebrated in honor of the Virgin Immaculate Conception, they begin on November 30 until December 8. It is one of the oldest patron saint festivities in the country.

== Climate ==
Cotuí has a trade-wind tropical rainforest climate (Köppen Af).

Climate data for Cotuí (1961-1990)
Month	Jan	Feb	Mar	Apr	May	Jun	Jul	Aug	Sep	Oct	Nov	Dec	Year
Record high °C (°F)	34.0 (93.2)	35.0 (95.0)	37.2 (99.0)	37.3 (99.1)	38.6 (101.5)	39.2 (102.6)	38.6 (101.5)	37.8 (100.0)	38.9 (102.0)	37.6 (99.7)	35.3 (95.5)	34.2 (93.6)	39.2 (102.6)
Mean daily maximum °C (°F)	29.6 (85.3)	30.4 (86.7)	31.5 (88.7)	32.0 (89.6)	32.4 (90.3)	33.1 (91.6)	32.9 (91.2)	33.0 (91.4)	33.3 (91.9)	33.0 (91.4)	31.3 (88.3)	29.6 (85.3)	31.8 (89.2)
Mean daily minimum °C (°F)	18.5 (65.3)	18.8 (65.8)	19.8 (67.6)	20.5 (68.9)	21.5 (70.7)	22.0 (71.6)	22.1 (71.8)	22.0 (71.6)	21.7 (71.1)	21.4 (70.5)	20.6 (69.1)	19.1 (66.4)	20.7 (69.3)
Record low °C (°F)	13.8 (56.8)	15.0 (59.0)	14.7 (58.5)	15.0 (59.0)	15.6 (60.1)	16.8 (62.2)	16.7 (62.1)	16.9 (62.4)	16.5 (61.7)	16.5 (61.7)	15.6 (60.1)	15.0 (59.0)	13.8 (56.8)
Average rainfall mm (inches)	88.2 (3.47)	98.0 (3.86)	105.8 (4.17)	126.7 (4.99)	234.2 (9.22)	149.6 (5.89)	189.9 (7.48)	209.1 (8.23)	164.1 (6.46)	161.2 (6.35)	167.7 (6.60)	148.9 (5.86)	1,843.4 (72.58)
Average rainy days (≥ 1.0 mm)	10.8	9.0	9.4	9.4	13.9	12.5	15.9	15.4	11.7	12.4	13.1	13.5	147
Source: NOAA
