= Monte Plata =

- Municipality
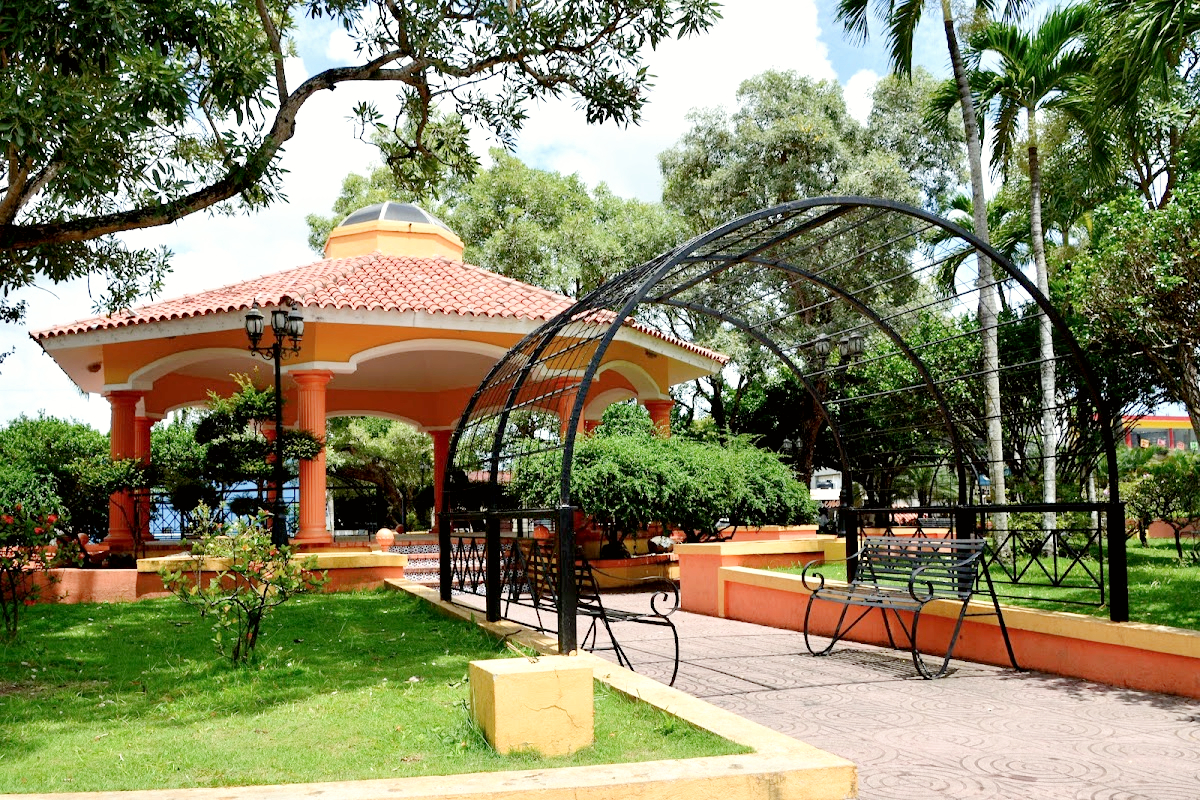

- Location within the Dominican Republic
- Coordinates: 18°48′36″N 69°47′24″W
- Country: Dominican Republic
- Province: Monte Plata
- Founded: 1606

Area
  - Total: 623.55 km^{2} (240.75 sq mi)
- Elevation: 56 m (184 ft)

Population (2012)
  - Total: 57,553
  - Density: 92.299/km^{2} (239.05/sq mi)
- Municipal Districts: 3
- Distance to – Santo Domingo: 153 km
- Climate: Af

Monte Plata is a town, municipality (municipio) and the capital of the Monte Plata province in the Dominican Republic. It includes the municipal districts (distritos municipal) of Boyá, Chirino, and Don Juan.

== History ==
Monte Plata was founded by residents of the towns of Monte Cristi and Puerto Plata. Its destruction was ordered by the king of Spain and carried-out by Antonio Ozorio, Governor of the Island. The name is a portmanteau (word made by blending parts of two (or more) other words) of the names of the two cities MONTE Cristi and Puerto PLATA. The founders of Monte Plata were 87 families from the two previously mentioned cities.

== Climate ==
Climate data for Monte Plata (1961-1990)
Month	Jan	Feb	Mar	Apr	May	Jun	Jul	Aug	Sep	Oct	Nov	Dec	Year
Record high °C (°F)	33.7 (92.7)	33.7 (92.7)	35.8 (96.4)	36.9 (98.4)	37.9 (100.2)	36.7 (98.1)	36.6 (97.9)	37.8 (100.0)	37.9 (100.2)	36.6 (97.9)	35.8 (96.4)	33.7 (92.7)	37.9 (100.2)
Mean daily maximum °C (°F)	29.5 (85.1)	30.1 (86.2)	31.3 (88.3)	32.3 (90.1)	32.6 (90.7)	33.0 (91.4)	33.1 (91.6)	33.0 (91.4)	32.9 (91.2)	32.2 (90.0)	31.0 (87.8)	29.5 (85.1)	31.7 (89.1)
Mean daily minimum °C (°F)	18.8 (65.8)	19.1 (66.4)	20.0 (68.0)	20.7 (69.3)	21.8 (71.2)	22.3 (72.1)	22.4 (72.3)	22.3 (72.1)	22.1 (71.8)	21.8 (71.2)	20.6 (69.1)	19.4 (66.9)	20.9 (69.6)
Record low °C (°F)	12.9 (55.2)	14.8 (58.6)	14.7 (58.5)	14.9 (58.8)	16.4 (61.5)	15.4 (59.7)	19.4 (66.9)	17.3 (63.1)	18.9 (66.0)	18.6 (65.5)	15.7 (60.3)	13.9 (57.0)	12.9 (55.2)
Average rainfall mm (inches)	60.9 (2.40)	78.1 (3.07)	102.3 (4.03)	120.1 (4.73)	256.1 (10.08)	232.3 (9.15)	232.0 (9.13)	327.6 (12.90)	252.4 (9.94)	211.7 (8.33)	118.1 (4.65)	67.2 (2.65)	2,058.8 (81.06)
Average rainy days (≥ 1.0 mm)	6.4	6.4	7.1	8.0	14.0	14.5	14.6	16.1	14.4	13.6	9.6	8.2	132.9
Source: NOAA

== Hydrology ==
In the municipality the main rivers are the Ozama and the Yabacao. Other rivers are the tributaries, Yamasá, Mijo, Sabita and Guanuma.

== Culture ==
Monte Plata possesses a wealth of folkloric elements and rich culture. Some of its best-known cultural elements are its folk songs, folk dances, oral and written traditions, historic monuments, and popular folk beliefs.

== Gallery ==
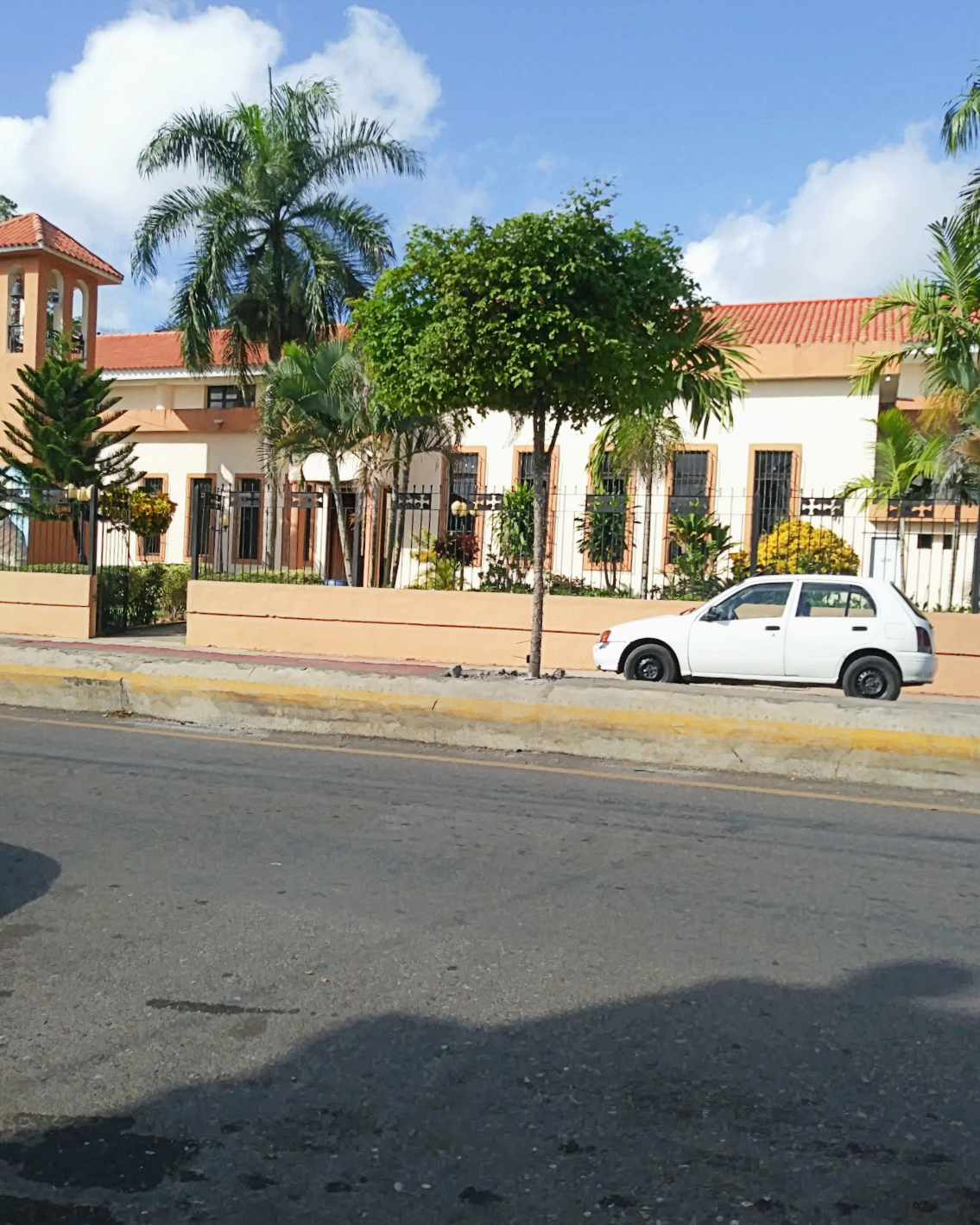

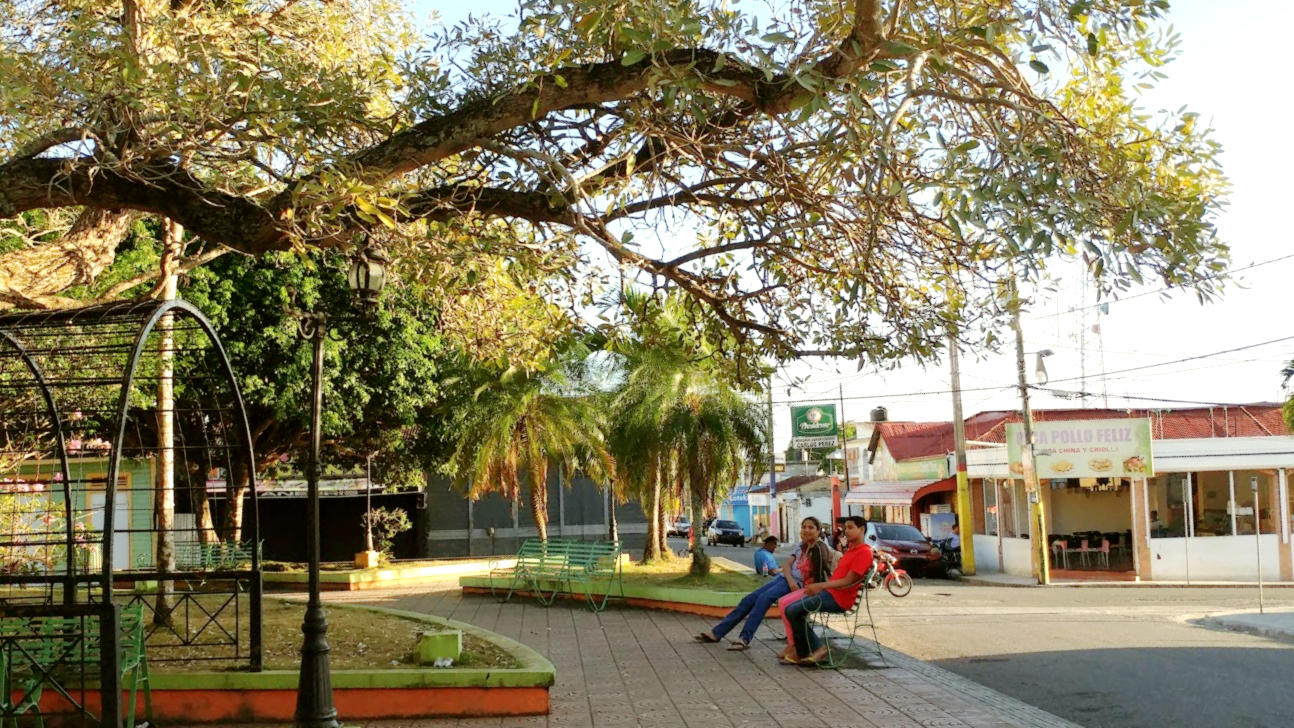

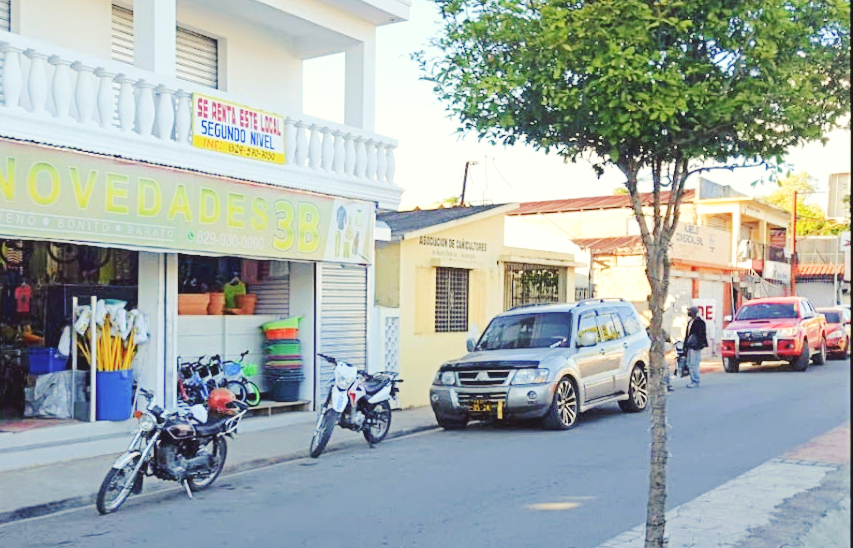
