= Sánchez Ramírez Province =

Province of the Dominican Republic

Sánchez Ramírez
- Province
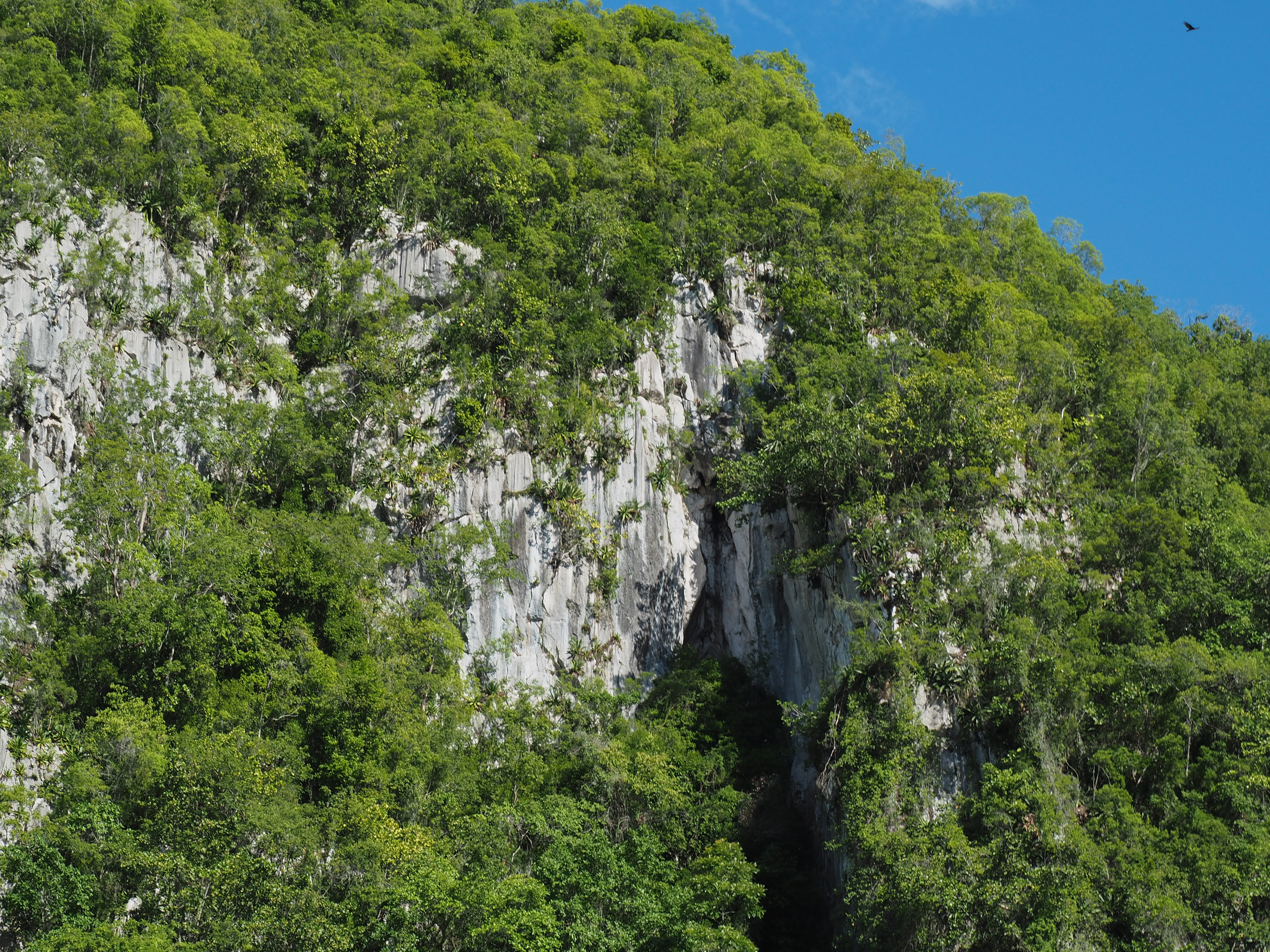
- Sanchez Ramirez National Park

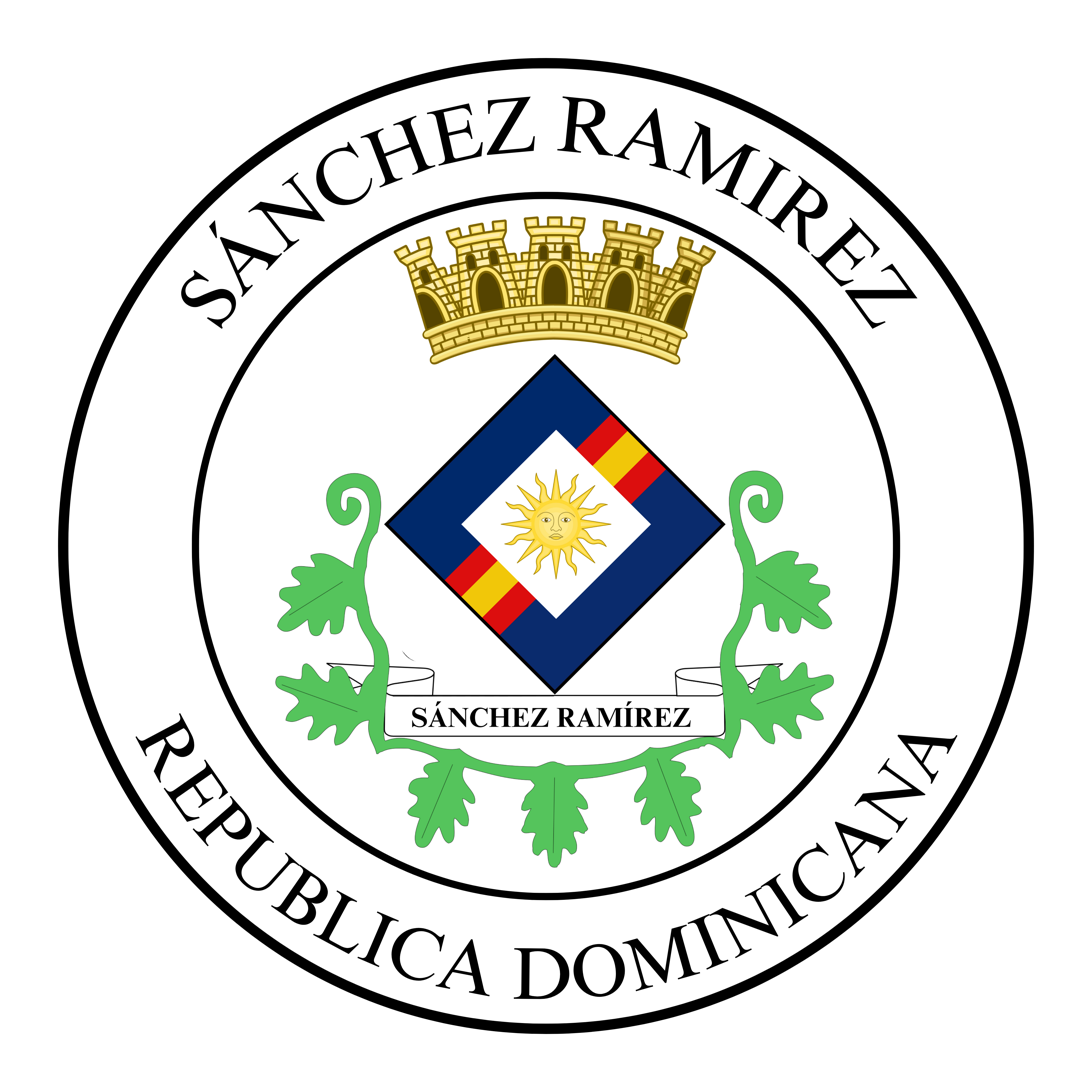
- Coat of arms

- Location of the Sánchez Ramírez Province
- Coordinates: 19°00′58″N 70°07′33″W
- Country: Dominican Republic
- Region: Cibao
- Province since: 1952
- Capital: Cotuí

Government
  - Type: Subdivisions
  - Body: 4 municipalities 8 municipal districts
  - Congresspersons: 1 Senator; 3 Deputies

Area
  - Total: 1,185.3 km^{2} (457.6 sq mi)

Population (2022)
  - Total: 162,642
  - Density: 137.22/km^{2} (355.39/sq mi)
- Time zone: UTC-4 (AST)
- Area code: 1-809 1-829 1-849
- ISO 3166-2: DO-24
- Postal Code: 43000

Sánchez Ramírez (Spanish pronunciation: [ˈsantʃes ɾaˈmiɾes]) It is spread over an area of 1,185.3 km^{2} (457.6 sq mi), and has its capital at Cotuí. It was established in 1952. As per the 2022 census, it had a population of 162,642 inhabitants. It is named after Juan Sánchez Ramírez.

== History ==
The region was part of the La Vega Province till 1945, after which it became part of the Duarte Province. Sánchez Ramírez province was created on 3 March 1952 with parts of the provinces of Duarte and La Vega. It is named after Juan Sánchez Ramírez, who was born in Cotuí and fought against the French colonial rule.

== Geography ==
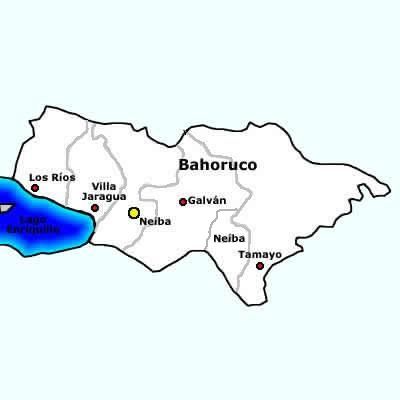
Municipalities of the Province

Sánchez Ramírez is one of the 31 provinces of the Dominican Republic. It is spread over an area of 1,185.3 km^{2} (457.6 sq mi). It is located in the central part of the country, and is bordered by the Duarte Province to the north, Monte Plata Province to the south and east, Monseñor Nouel Province to the west and La Vega Province to the northwest.

=== Climate and vegetation ===
The province has a tropical rainforest climate (Köppen climate classification: Af). It has an average annual temperature is 25.34 °C (77.61 °F), and receives an average annual rainfall of 8.06 cm (3.17 in) annually.

About 328.41 km^{2} (126.80 sq mi) land area is covered by broad leaf forests, which makes up 28% of the area of the province. Agricultural lands cover an area of 686.2 km^{2} (264.9 sq mi) in the province. There are two protected areas, which occupy 141.05 km^{2} (54.46 sq mi) or 12% of the land area.

=== Administration ===
Its capital city is Cotuí. The province is divided into four municipalities (municipios)– Cevicos, Cotuí, Fantino, and La Mata. These are further sub-divided into eight Municipal Districts–Quita Sueño, Comedero Arriba, Caballero, Angelina, La Bija, Hernando Alonzo, Platanal, and La Cueva.

== Demographics ==
According to the 2022 census, the province had a population of 162,642 inhabitants. The population consisted of 82,409 males (50.7%) and 80,233 females (49.3%). About 24.3% of the population was below the age of 15 years, 64.6% belonged to the age group of 15–64 years, and 11.1% was aged 65 years or older. The province had an urban population of 90,403 inhabitants (55.6%) and a rural population of 72,239 inhabitants (44.4%).

== Economy ==
The economy is mainly based on agriculture and mining. Major agricultural produce include rice, coffee, sugercane, banana, and cocoa beans.
