= Miss Dominican Republic =

Beauty pageant

Miss República Dominicana
- Formation: 1927; 99 years ago
- Type: Beauty pageant
- Headquarters: Santo Domingo
- Location: Dominican Republic
- Members: Miss Universe; Miss World; Miss International; Miss Earth; Miss Supranational
- Official language: Spanish
- Leader: Magali Febles
- Website: missrdu.com

Miss Dominican Republic (Spanish: Miss República Dominicana) is an annual national beauty pageant that selects the Dominican Republic's official representative to Miss Universe—one of the Big Four International beauty pageants.

== History ==
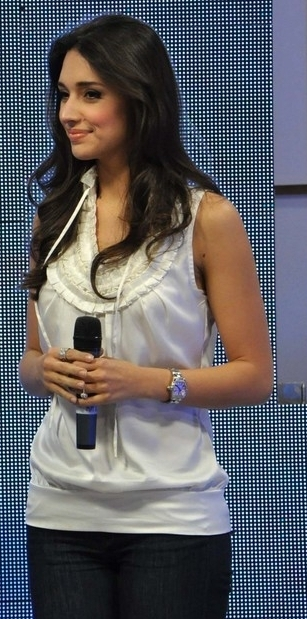
Amelia Vega, Miss Universe 2003 winner

Miss Dominican Republic Organization has been in operation since 1927. In 1956, the pageant was officially restarted after crowning models from 1952 until 1955. In 1956, Olga Fiallo from Santiago won, making the Dominican Republic's first representative to Miss Universe. In 1966, the Concurso Nacional de Belleza Dominicana lost its Miss Universe rights for only one year but on that same year it gained their Miss World franchise sending the winner of that year, Jeanette Dotel from San Juan as their first representative. In 1967, the organization officially decided that the Winner would go to Miss Universe, First Runner-up would enter Miss World and Second Runner-up to a Festival of Latin Beauties in South America. The MRD organization had acquired the Miss International rights, but the organization would only send a representative if the budget allowed them. It wasn't until 1980, when they decided that the Second Runner-up would enter either in Miss International, Reinado Nacional del Café or Miss América Latina. In 1989 until 2000, the official Second Runner-up would enter Miss International, the Third Runner-up would enter Reinado Nacional del Café and the Fourth Runner-up would enter Miss América Latina. This has been the same until 2003 when the organization separated into two separate organizations.

=== Miss República Dominicana Universo Organization ===
The Miss República Dominicana Universo Organization was created in 2003 by Belkys Reyes, and was taken over by Magali Febles in 2004. Since 2003, the representatives of Dominican Republic for one out of the four major international pageants have been selected by this organization. This organization is in charge of sending representatives to Miss Universe. Miss República Dominicana Universo competes in Miss Universe. Also, this organization has 15 franchises in other international competitions and sends representatives to these competitions every year such as Reina Hispanoamericana and Miss Continentes Unidos.

=== Reina Nacional de Belleza Dominicana Organization ===
The organization of Reina Nacional de Belleza Dominicana was created in 2003 by Diany Mota, and is still run by her today. Since 2003, the representatives of Dominican Republic for three out of the four major international pageants have been selected by this organization, until in 2015 when they lost the Miss Earth franchise. This organization is in charge of sending representatives to Miss World and Miss International. Miss Mundo Dominicana competes in Miss World and Miss Internacional Dominicana competes in Miss International.

=== Provincial Pageants ===
In 2009, there has been a huge involvement of the organization in regional pageants. There is right now 6 regional pageants.

For the first time, Miss Dominican Republic organization, will have auditions / contests in all the provinces except the province of Santo Domingo, because of its huge population, the 3 metropolitan municipalities have auditions / contests. The pageants are:

Miss Azua
Miss Bahoruco
Miss Barahona
Miss Dajabón
Miss Distrito Nacional
Miss Duarte
Miss El Seibo
Miss Elías Piña
Miss Espaillat
Miss Guerra-Boca Chica
Miss Hato Mayor
Miss Hermanas Mirabal
Miss Independencia
Miss La Altagracia
Miss La Romana
Miss La Vega
Miss Los Alcarrizos
Miss María Trinidad Sánchez
Miss Monseñor Nouel
Miss Monte Cristi
Miss Monte Plata
Miss Pedernales
Miss Pedro Brand
Miss Peravia
Miss Puerto Plata
Miss Samaná
Miss San Cristóbal
Miss San José de Ocoa
Miss San Juan
Miss San Pedro de Macorís
Miss Sánchez Ramírez
Miss Santiago
Miss Santiago Rodríguez
Miss Santo Domingo Este
Miss Santo Domingo Norte
Miss Santo Domingo Oeste
Miss Valverde
Dominican Communities Abroad
Miss Comunidad Dominicana en Estados Unidos
Miss Comunidad Dominicana en México
Miss Comunidad Dominicana en Puerto Rico
Miss Comunidad Dominicana en Venezuela
Miss Comunidad Dominicana en Italia
Miss Comunidad Dominicana en Japón

== Titleholders ==
The following is a list of winners. From 2002 to Present.

Year	Province	Finals Venue	Miss República Dominicana	Placement	Special Awards	Ref.
2026	La Vega	Santo Domingo	Melissa Núñez	TBA		
2025	Barahona	Santo Domingo	Jennifer Ventura	Top 30		
2024	Distrito Nacional	Santo Domingo	María Celinée Santos Frías	Top 30		
2023	Sánchez Ramírez	Santo Domingo	Mariana Isabel Downing	Unplaced		
2022	United States	Santo Domingo	Andreína Martínez Founier-Rosado	2nd Runner-Up		
2021	Azua	Santo Domingo	Debbie Áflalo Vargas	Unplaced		
2020	La Romana	Santo Domingo	Kimberly Marie Jiménez Rodríguez	4th Runner-Up	Spirit of Carnival Award	
2019	Punta Cana	Santo Domingo	Clauvid Luz Dály Cabrera	Top 20		
2018	Laguna Salada	Santiago	Aldy María Bernard Bonilla	Unplaced		
2017	Duarte	Santiago	Carmen Muñoz Guzmán	Unplaced		
2016	Maimón	Santo Domingo	Rosalba Abreu García	Unplaced		
2015	Espaillat	Santo Domingo	Clarissa María Molina Contreras	Top 10		
2014	Higüey	Santo Domingo	Kimberly Altagracia Castillo Mota	Unplaced		
2013	Elías Piña	Higüey	Yaritza Miguelina Reyes Ramírez	Top 10		
2012	Distrito Nacional	Santo Domingo	Dulcita Lynn Lieggi Francisco	Unplaced		
2011	Santiago	Santo Domingo	Dalia Cristina Fernández Sánchez	Unplaced		
2010	Espaillat	Santo Domingo	Eva Carolina Arias Viñas	Unplaced		
2009	San José de Ocoa	Santo Domingo	Ada Aimée de la Cruz Ramírez	1st Runner-Up		
2008	Hermanas Mirabal	Santo Domingo	Marianne Elizabeth Cruz González	2nd Runner-Up	Best National Costume (Top 10)	
2007	Santiago	Santo Domingo	Massiel Indira Taveras Henríquez	Unplaced		
2006	Santiago	Santo Domingo	Mía Lourdes Taveras López	Unplaced		
2005	Distrito Nacional	Santo Domingo	Renata De Jesús Soñé Savery	2nd Runner-Up		
2004	La Vega	Santo Domingo	Larissa Del Mar Fiallo Scanlón	Unplaced		
2003	Santiago	Santo Domingo	Amelia Victoria Vega Polanco	Miss Universe 2003	Best National Costume	
2002	San Pedro de Macorís	Santo Domingo	Ruth Amelia Ocumárez Apataño	Unplaced		

=== Province rankings ===
Province	Titles	Winning Years
Distrito Nacional	9	1929*, 1956, 1983, 1985, 1990, 1993, 2005, 2012, 2024
Santiago	9	1927, 1963, 1987, 1991, 1992, 2003, 2006, 2007, 2011
La Vega	6	1952, 1989, 1994, 2004, 2012, 2026
Puerto Plata	6	1928, 1962, 1968, 1977, 1981, 1985
Duarte	4	1953, 1967, 1988, 2017
Espaillat	4	1958, 1974, 2010, 2015
Sánchez Ramírez	2	1965, 2023
Azua	2	1997, 2021
La Romana	2	1996, 2020
Elías Piña	2	1964, 2013
Hermanas Mirabal	2	1973, 2008
San Pedro de Macorís	2	1982, 2002
San Juan	2	1966, 2001
San Cristóbal	2	1955**, 1995
Samaná	2	1969, 1979
Com. Dom. En EE.UU.	1	2022
Punta Cana	1	2019
Laguna Salada	1	2018
Maimón	1	2016
Higüey	1	2014
San José de Ocoa	1	2009
Constanza	1	2000
Moca	1	1999
Monseñor Nouel	1	1998
Monte Cristi	1	1986
Santiago Rodríguez	1	1980
María Trinidad Sánchez	1	1978
Independencia	1	1976
Dajabón	1	1975
Barahona	1	1972
El Seibo	1	1971
Valverde	1	1970
Pedernales	1	1957
La Altagracia	1	1954

- *As Old Santo Domingo Province
- ** As Trujillo Province
- *** As San Rafael Province
- **** Won handpicked
- ***** As Salcedo Province
- ****** Crowned as new titleholder

== Placements ==
=== Miss World ===
- : Declared as Winner
- : Ended as runner-up or top 5/6 qualification
- : Ended as one of the finalists or semi-finalists
- : Ended as special awards winner

Miss Mundo Dominicana (Miss World Dominican Republic) is a pageant that was made 2003. Since 1956 they crowned Miss Dominican Republic, Miss Dominican World and Reina Nacional de Belleza Miss República Dominicana together. Then they split up in 2003. In 2011, the Miss World Dominican Republic was given to Dominican designer Diany Mota, along with Miss International Dominican Republic. The following is a list of winners. From 2003 to Present.

Year	Province	Delegate	Placement	Special Awards
2026	Distrito Nacional	Joheirry Mola	Miss World 2026	Miss World Top Model (Top 4); Miss World Multimedia (Top 20)
2025	Distrito Nacional	Mayra Delgado	Top 40	Miss World Multimedia
2024	No competition held			
2023	Distrito Nacional	María Victoria Bayo	Top 12	Miss World Top Model (Top 20)
2022	Miss World 2021 was rescheduled to 16 March 2022 due to the COVID-19 pandemic outbreak in Puerto Rico, no edition started in 2022			
2021	Duarte	Emmy Peña	Top 40	Miss World Caribbean; Miss World Top Model (Top 13)
2020	Due to the impact of COVID-19 pandemic, no competition held			
2019	Jarabacoa	Alba Marie Blair Rodríguez	Unplaced	Miss World Top Model (Top 40)
2018	La Altagracia	Denise Margarita Romero Franjul	Unplaced	Miss World Sport (Top 24)
2017	Santiago	Aletxa Marie Mueses Santana	Top 40	Miss World Sport; Miss World Top Model (Top 30)
2016	Santo Domingo Norte	Yaritza Miguelina Reyes Ramírez	1st Runner-up	Miss World Caribbean; Miss World Top Model (2nd Runner-up); Beauty with a Purpose (Top 24); Miss World Sport (Top 24)
2015	Duarte	Cynthia María Núñez	Unplaced	
2014	Santo Domingo Este	Dhío Moreno Santos	Top 25	
2013	Com. Dom. En EE.UU	Joely Bernat Rodríguez	Top 20	
2012	Hermanas Mirabal	Sally Aponte Tejada	Top 30	
2011	Duarte	Marianly Tejada Burgos	Unplaced	Miss World Sport
2010	Distrito Nacional	Elizabeth Turra Brower	Did not compete	
2009	Monte Plata	Ana Rita Contreras Sosa	Unplaced	
2008	Distrito Nacional	Geisha Nathali Montes De Oca Robles	Unplaced	
2007	San Cristóbal	Ada Aimée de la Cruz Ramírez	Top 16	Miss World Beach Beauty
2006	Santiago	Paola María Torres Cohén	Unplaced	
2005	La Vega	Elisa Abreu De Los Santos	Unplaced	
2004	Monseñor Nouel	Claudia Julissa Cruz Rodríguez	1st Runner-up	
2003	Sánchez Ramírez	María Eugenia Vargas	Top 20	

=== Province rankings ===
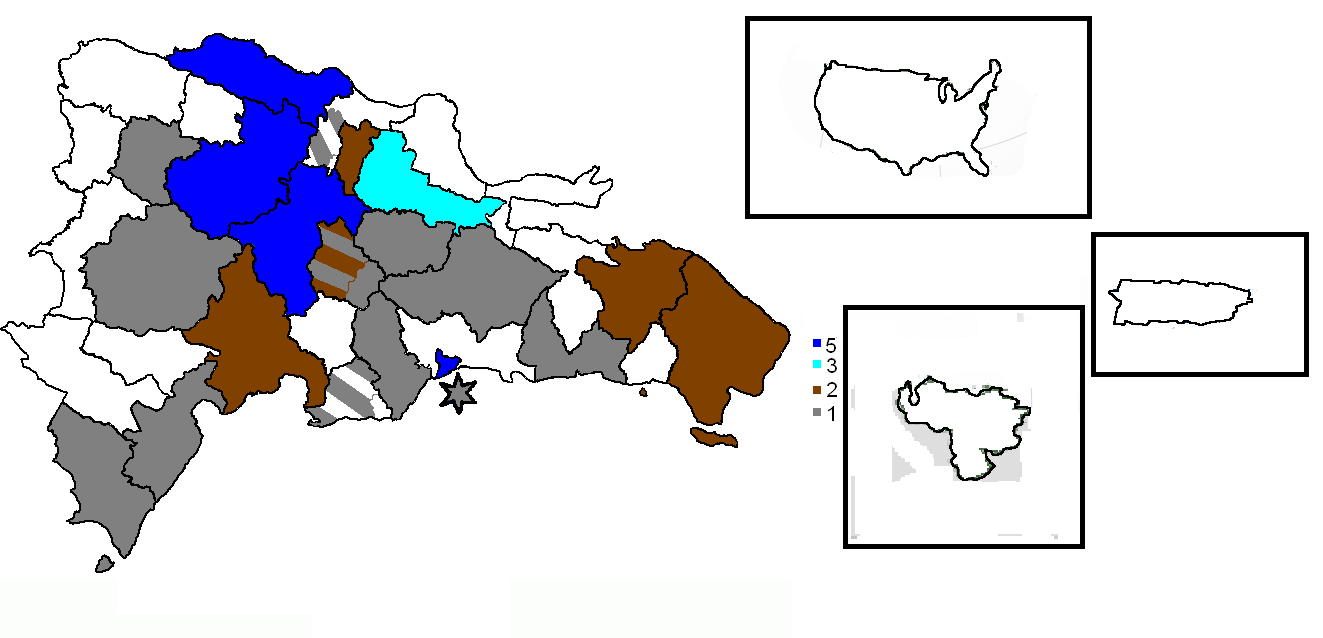
Province and Municipalities that had won Miss Dominican Republic for Miss World.

Joheirry Mola, Miss World 2026 winner

Province	Titles	Winning years
Distrito Nacional	8	1967, 1982, 2000, 2008, 2010*, 2023, 2025, 2026
Santiago	6	1976, 1980, 1985, 1986, 2006, 2017
Duarte	5	1968, 1981, 2011, 2015, 2021
La Vega	5	1976, 1991, 1992, 1993, 2005
Puerto Plata	5	1972, 1973, 1978, 1989, 1997
La Altagracia	3	1970, 1977, 2018
Hermanas Mirabal	2	1987**, 2012
Bonao	2	2001, 2002*
Azua	2	1983, 1996
El Seibo	2	1984, 1995
Jarabacoa	1	2019
Santo Domingo Norte	1	2016
Santo Domingo Este	1	2014
Com. Dom. En EE.UU.	1	2013
Monte Plata	1	2009
San Cristóbal	1	2007
Monseñor Nouel	1	2004
Sánchez Ramírez	1	2003
Moca	1	1999
San Pedro de Macorís	1	1998
Baní	1	1994
Pedernales	1	1990
Santiago Rodríguez	1	1988
Bahoruco	1	1979
Ciudad Santo Domingo	1	1975
Barahona	1	1971
San Juan	1	1966

- *Was prepared to go to Miss World but had an issues in attending and withdrew before going.
- ** As Salcedo Province

=== Miss International ===
- : Declared as Winner
- : Ended as runner-up or top 5/6 qualification
- : Ended as one of the finalists or semi-finalists
- : Ended as special awards winner

Reina Nacional de Belleza Miss República Dominicana is a pageant that was made 2003. Since 1962 they crowned Miss Dominican Republic, Miss Dominican World and Reina Nacional de Belleza Miss República Dominicana together. Then they split up in 2003 until 2013. In 1991 Miss Dominican Republic International 1991 Rafaela Suarez didn't wanted to enter in Miss International 1991, so Melissa Vargas took over. In the Miss Dominican Republic pageant 1995 and Miss Dominican Republic 1996, the winners would enter both Miss Universe and Miss International. In 2003, the first winner, Aura Ramos could enter Miss International 2003 due to visa problems at last minute. It had various names during its history. They were Señorita República Dominicana Internacional, Miss RD Internacional and Reina Nacional de Belleza. The following is a list of winners. From 2003 to Present.

Year	Province	Delegate	Placement	Special Awards
2027	Santiago	Paola Michelle Cruz	TBA	
2026	Santiago	Verónica Musri	TBA	
2025	Santo Domingo Este	Ana Maspons	Top 10	Miss Fitness
2024	Santo Domingo Este	Miyuki Cruz	Top 20	People's Choice
2023	La Vega	Yamilex Hernandez	Top 15	
2022	La Altagracia	Celinee Santos Frias	4th Runner-Up	
Due to the impact of COVID-19 pandemic, no competition held between 2020—2021
2019	Santo Domingo Este	Zaidy Bello	Unplaced	
2018	Com. Dom. En EE.UU.	Stéphanie Bustamante	Unplaced	
2017	Pedernales	Jennifer Valdez	Unplaced	
2016	Duarte	Cynthia Núñez	Top 15	
2015	La Altagracia	Irina Peguero	Unplaced	
2014	Com. Dom. En EE.UU.	Bárbara Santana	Unplaced	
2013	Santiago	Carmen Muñoz Guzmán	Unplaced	
2012	Santiago	Melody Mir Jiménez	3rd Runner-up	
2011	Espaillat	Catherine Ramírez Rosario	Unplaced	
2010	María Trinidad Sánchez	Sofinel Báez	Unplaced	
2009	Santiago	Victoria Fernández	Top 15	
2008	Monseñor Nouel	Claudia Mabel Peña Gómez	Unplaced	
2007	La Altagracia	Ana Carolina Viñas	Unplaced	
2006	Monte Plata	Wilma Joama Abreu Nazario	Top 12	
2005	Espaillat	Yadira Geara Cury	1st Runner-up	
2004	Com. Dom. En EE.UU.	Carol Melissa Arciniegas Disla	Unplaced	
2003	—	Aura Ramos	Did not compete	

=== Province rankings ===
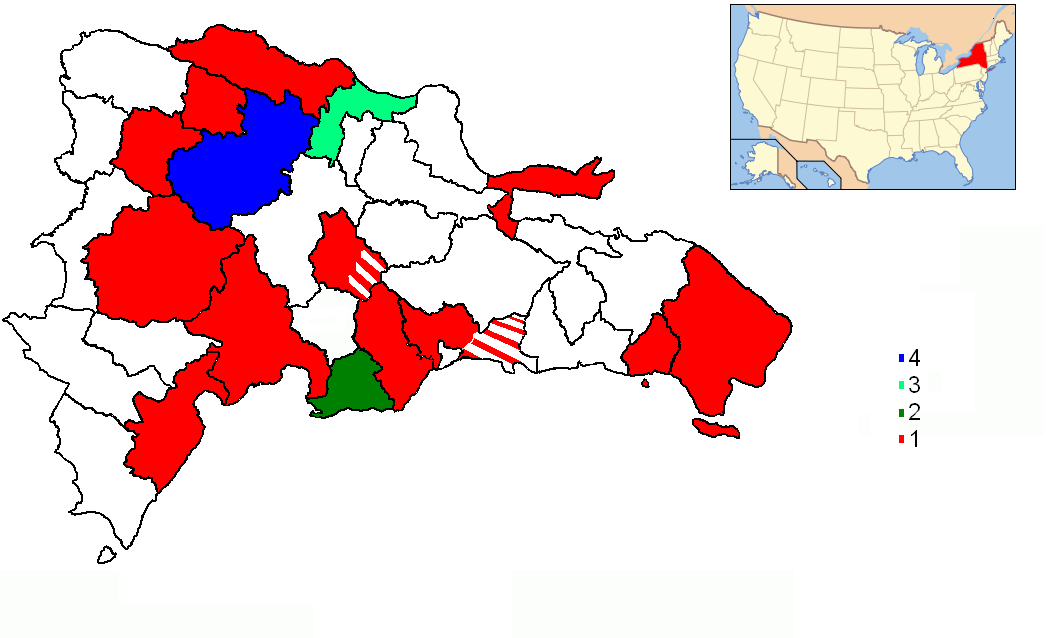
Province and Municipalities that had won Miss Dominican Republic for Miss International.

Province	Titles	Winning years
Santiago	8	1967, 1991, 1994, 2009, 2012, 2013, 2026, 2027
Santo Domingo Este	4	2001, 2019, 2024, 2025
La Altagracia	3	2007, 2015, 2022
Com. Dom. En EE.UU.	3	2004, 2014, 2018
Espaillat	3	1963, 2005, 2011
Peravia	2	1997, 1999
Com. Dom. En Japón	1	2024
La Vega	1	2023
Pedernales	1	2017
Duarte	1	2016
María Trinidad Sánchez	1	2010
Monseñor Nouel	1	2008
Monte Plata	1	2006
Bonao	1	2002
Samaná	1	2000
San Juan	1	1998
La Romana	1	1996
San Cristóbal	1	1995
Barahona	1	1992
Puerto Plata	1	1990
Azua	1	1989
Valverde	1	1964
Santiago Rodríguez	1	1962

=== Miss Earth ===
- : Declared as Winner
- : Ended as runner-up or top 5/6 qualification
- : Ended as one of the finalists or semi-finalists
- : Ended as special awards winner

The Dominican Republic Earth, also known as Miss Tierra República Dominicana, used to be crowned together with the Miss Dominican Republic Universe, Miss Dominica World, and Reina Nacional de Belleza Miss República Dominicana from 2001 to 2003. In 2003, the four beauty pageant titles were split until 2013. The Miss Tierra República Dominicana national pageant is held annually. The winner is expected to participate in the international Miss Earth beauty pageant, an annual international beauty pageant promoting environmental awareness. The Miss Earth winner serves as the spokesperson for the Miss Earth Foundation, the United Nations Environment Programme (UNEP) and other environmental organizations. The following is a list of winners. From 2001 to Present.

Year	Province	Delegate	Placement	Special Award(s)
2026	TBA	TBA	TBA	
2025	Distrito Nacional	Valeria Conde	Unplaced	(silver) Green Leaders in Action Challenge The Americas (Group 2)
2024	Distrito Nacional	Tamara Aznar	Top 8 (Runner-Up)	(silver) Best Philippine Heritage Attire Award
2023	Samanà	Elianny Capellán	Unplaced	
2022	María Trinidad Sánchez	Nieves Marcano	Unplaced	
2021	Distrito Nacional	Nicole Franco	Unplaced	
2020	Distrito Nacional	María Villalona	Unplaced	
2019	Distrito Nacional	Yasmín Evangelista	Unplaced	
2018	Duarte	Gabriela Franceschini	Unplaced	Miss Brisa Marina; (silver) Swimsuit (Fire group); (silver) Long Gown (Fire group)
2017	Boca Chica	Ingrid Franco	Unplaced	(bronze) Best National Costume (North América)
2016	Valverde	Nicole Jimeno	Unplaced	
2015	Monte Plata	Alexandra Parker	Unplaced	
2014	San Cristóbal	Mayté Brito*	Unplaced	Miss Oakwood; (silver) Resort Wear
2013	San Juan	María Eugenia de los Santos	Unplaced	
2012	Distrito Nacional	Rocío Castellanos	Unplaced	(gold) Walk with M.E.; Miss Careline; Miss Bicol Shirts; (bronze) Sponsored Swimsuit Parade; (silver) Ever Bilena Make-up Challenge
2011	Monseñor Nouel	Sarah Féliz Mok	Unplaced	
2010	Samaná	Wisleidy Osorio	Unplaced	
2009	San Francisco de Macorís	Mariel García	Unplaced	
2008	San Francisco de Macorís	Diana Flores	Unplaced	
2007	Azua	Themys Febriel	Top 16	
2006	Puerto Plata	Alondra Peña	Unplaced	
2005	Hato Mayor	Amell Santana	Miss Air (1st Runner-up)	Miss Pond's
2004	Santiago Rodríguez	Nileny Estevez	Unplaced	
2003	La Romana	Suanny Frotaan	Unplaced	
2002	Duvergé	Yilda Santana	Unplaced	
2001	Elías Piña	Catherine Núñez	Unplaced	

- *Cheryl Ortega was originally set to compete at Miss Earth 2014 but withdrew due to her studies. Mayte Brito who was originally set to compete the following year will step in her place.

=== Province rankings ===
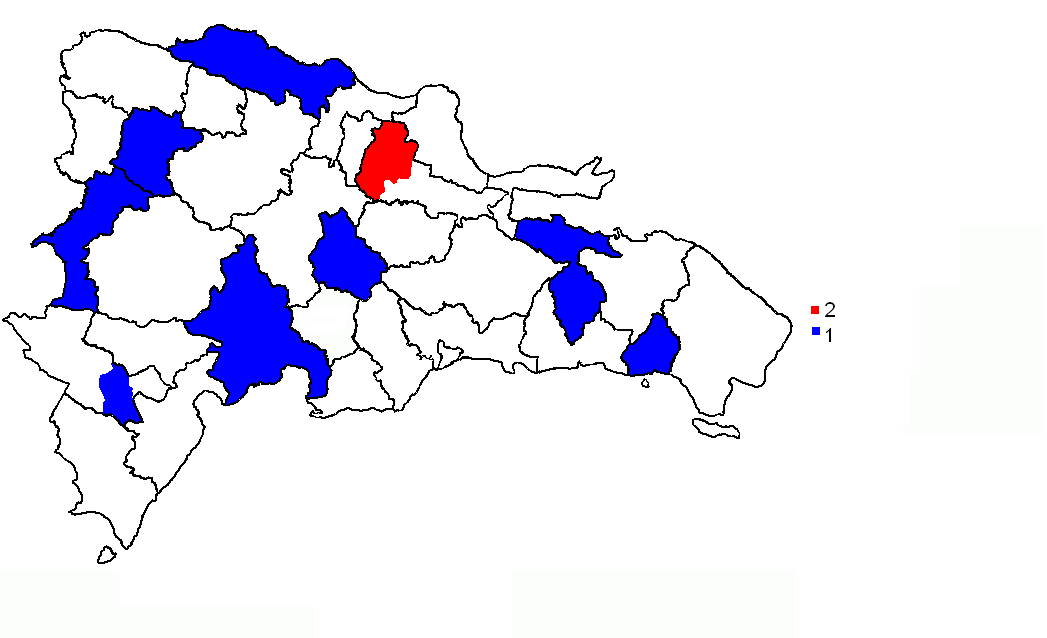
Province and Municipalities that had won Miss Dominican Republic for Miss Earth.

Province	Titles	Winning Years
Distrito Nacional	6	2012, 2019, 2020, 2021, 2024, 2025
San Francisco de Macorís	2	2008, 2009
María Trinidad Sánchez	1	2021
Boca Chica	1	2017
Valverde	1	2016
Monte Plata	1	2015
San Cristóbal	1	2014*
San Juan	1	2013
Monseñor Nouel	1	2011
Samaná	1	2010
Azua	1	2007
Puerto Plata	1	2006
Hato Mayor	1	2005
Santiago Rodríguez	1	2004
La Romana	1	2003
Duvergé	1	2002
Elias Piña	1	2001

=== Miss Supranational ===
- : Declared as Winner
- : Ended as runner-up or top 5/6 qualification
- : Ended as one of the finalists or semi-finalists
- : Ended as special awards winner

Year	Province	Delegate	Placement	Special Awards
2026	Hermanas Mirabal	Nicole Hernández	Top 24	
2025	Santo Domingo	Karibel Pérez	Top 24	Miss Supranational Caribbean
2024	Pedernales	Jénnifer Váldez	Unplaced	
2023	Distrito Nacional	Crystal Matos	Top 12	
2022	Valverde	Emely Altagracia Ruiz Acosta	Unplaced	
2021	Distrito Nacional	Eoanna Constanza Santana	4th Runner-Up	
Due to the impact of COVID-19 pandemic, no competition in 2020
2019	Samaná	Yaliza Burgos	Top 25	Miss Supranational Caribbean
2018	Distrito Nacional	Yomaira de Luna	Unplaced	
2017	Peravia	Lia Rossis	Unplaced	
Did not compete
2015	Boca Chica	Ingrid Mauricia Franco Alvarado	Unplaced	
2014	Distrito Nacional	Britney Ann Bueno	Unplaced	
2013	La Altagracia	Alba Marina Aquino Marte	Unplaced	
2012	Distrito Nacional	Chantel Martínez de la Cruz	Top 20	
2011	María Trinidad Sánchez	Sofinel Mariel Báez Santos	Top 20	Miss Elegance
2010	Distrito Nacional	Darling Cruz Roperto	Unplaced	
2009	Distrito Nacional	Kirsis Celestino Jean	Unplaced	

=== Province rankings ===
Province	Titles	Winning years
Distrito Nacional	7	2009, 2010, 2012, 2014, 2018, 2021, 2023
Hermanas Mirabal	1	2026
Santo Domingo	1	2025
Pedernales	1	2024
Valverde	1	2022
Samaná	1	2019
Peravia	1	2017
Boca Chica	1	2015
La Altagracia	1	2013
María Trinidad Sánchez	1	2011

== See also ==
- Mister Dominican Republic
- Miss Grand Dominican Republic
