= Miss Dominican Republic 2001 =

- Date: July 1, 2001
- Venue: Teatro Nacional Eduardo Brito, Santo Domingo, Dominican Republic
- Broadcaster: Color Vision
- Entrants: 24
- Winner: Ruth Amelia Ocumárez Apataño; San Pedro de Macorís

Miss República Dominicana 2001 was held on July 1, 2001. There were 24 candidates, representing provinces and municipalities, who entered. The winner would represent the Dominican Republic at Miss Universe 2002. The Miss Internacional República Dominicana would enter Miss International 2001. The first runner up would enter in Miss Globe International 2002. The rest of finalist entered different pageants.

== Results ==
Final results	Contestant
Miss República Dominicana 2001	San Pedro de Macorís - Ruth Ocumárez
Miss Internacional República Dominicana	Santo Domingo Este - Judith Cury
1st Runner-up	Distrito Nacional - Lorraine Díaz
2nd Runner-up	Com. Dominicana En Miami - Nilsen Frías
3rd Runner-up	Elías Piña - Catherine Núñez
Semi-finalists	Samaná - Farah Alfonseca; Puerto Plata - Saby Hedeman; Isla Saona - Ninoska Linares; Santiago - Indhira Montás; Bonao - Vanessa Hache

== Delegates ==
Represented	Contestant	Age	Height	Hometown
Azua	Michelle Patrick	21	1.72 m (5 ft 7 3/4 in)	San Francisco de Macorís
Bonao	Vanessa Hache	18	1.70 m (5 ft 7 in)	Bonao
Com. Dom. en Miami	Nilsen Frias Mateo	20	1.77 m (5 ft 9 3/4 in)	Aventura
Com. Dom. en Nueva York	Esther Lluberes	22	1.82 m (5 ft 11 3/4 in)	Queens
Distrito Nacional	Lorraine Díaz Bello	19	1.79 m (5 ft 10 1/2 in)	Santo Domingo
Elías Piña	Catherine Rafaela Núñez Jiménez	19	1.81 m (5 ft 11 1/4 in)	Santo Domingo
Independencia	Cheryl Victoria Rosado	17	1.83 m (6 ft 0 in)	Santo Domingo
Isla Saona	Ninoska Linares Rodríguez	22	1.74 m (5 ft 8 1/2 in)	Santo Domingo
La Altagracia	Yoelkis Melo Espinoza	25	1.76 m (5 ft 9 1/4 in)	Salvaleón de Higüey
La Romana	Geraldine Núñez	17	1.80 m (5 ft 10 3/4 in)	Santiago de los Caballeros
La Vega	Patricia Pimentel	23	1.72 m (5 ft 7 3/4 in)	Concepción de la Vega
Puerto Plata	Saby Hedeman	25	1.78 m (5 ft 10 in)	San Felipe de Puerto Plata
Monte Cristi	Michelle Reynoso	25	1.84 m (6 ft 1/2 in)	Santo Domingo
Nagua	Margarita Mejía	24	1.75 m (5 ft 9 in)	Santiago de los Caballeros
Neiba	Rosalina Hernández	18	1.77 m (5 ft 9 3/4 in)	Santo Domingo
Puerto Plata	Karen Carvajal Figuero	21	1.82 m (5 ft 11 3/4 in)	Santiago de los Caballeros
Salcedo	Rahilsa Sanabia	25	1.76 m (5 ft 9 1/4 in)	Moca
Samaná	Farah María Alfonseca Súarez	23	1.83 m (6 ft 0 in)	Santiago de los Caballeros
Distrito Nacional	Melina Jiménez Mejía	18	1.72 m (5 ft 7 3/4 in)	Santo Domingo
San Juan	Enyerlina Sánchez Tejada	19	1.83 m (6 ft 0 in)	San Juan de la Maguana
San Pedro de Macorís	Ruth Amelia Ocumárez Apataño	17	1.78 m (5 ft 10 in)	Santo Domingo
Santiago	Isaura Indhira Montás Romano	24	1.75 m (5 ft 9 in)	Santiago de los Caballeros
Santo Domingo Este	Belgica Judith Cury de Lara	19	1.77 m (5 ft 9 3/4 in)	Santo Domingo Este
Valverde Mao	Mariela Guzmán Peralta	23	1.80 m (5 ft 10 3/4 in)	Santiago de los Caballeros
