= Miss Dominican Republic 1994 =

Competition for Miss República Dominicana 1994

- Date: 4 August 1993
- Venue: El Gran Auditorio del Gran Teatro del Cibao, Santiago de los Caballeros, Dominican Republic
- Broadcaster: Telemicro
- Entrants: 24
- Winner: Vielka Veronica Valenzuela Lama; La Vega

The competition for Miss República Dominicana 1994 was held on 4 August 1993. There were 24 candidates, representing provinces and municipalities, who entered. The winner would represent the Dominican Republic at Miss Universe 1994. The first runner-up would enter Miss World 1994. The second runner-up would compete in Miss International 1994.

The remainder of the finalists entered different pageants.

== Results ==
Final results	Contestant
Miss República Dominicana 1994	La Vega – Vielka Valenzuela
1st Runner-up	Baní – Claudia Franjúl †
2nd Runner-up	Santiago – Alexia Lockhart
3rd Runner-up	El Seibo – Soraya Sánchez
4th Runner-up	Pedernales – Aleydis Collado
Semi-finalists	San Pedro de Macorís – Aimeé González; San Cristóbal – Denisse Alvarado; Pedro Brand – Sofía Tatís; Higüey – Elisa Medina; Nagua – Alexandra Batista

== Delegates ==
Represented	Contestant	Age	Height	Hometown
Azua	Salma Catalina Abreu Ynoa	22	174 cm 5 ft 9 in	Azua de Compostela
Baní	Claudia Franjúl González †	18	177 cm 5 ft 10 in	Santo Domingo
Bonao	Lisa Noruega Espinal	23	180 cm 5 ft 11 in	Santo Domingo
Distrito Nacional	Edeliza Mena Ruíz	25	171 cm 5 ft 7 in	Villa Mella
Duarte	Rosabel Mary Paulino de Torres	20	180 cm 5 ft 11 in	San Francisco de Macorís
Duvergé	Susana Karina Cevallos de la Rosa	19	169 cm 5 ft 7 in	Santo Domingo
El Seibo	Soraya del Rocío Sánchez Colón	21	184 cm 6 ft 0 in	Los Alcarrizos
Higüey	María Elisa Medina de Rojas	18	181 cm 5 ft 11 in	Salvaleón de Higüey
Jarabacoa	Fernanda Rivera de los Santos	24	170 cm 5 ft 7 in	Santo Domingo
Jimaní	Christina Hernández de Jesús	19	172 cm 5 ft 8 in	Santo Domingo
La Vega	Vielka Veronica Valenzuela Lama	20	180 cm 5 ft 11 in	Concepción de la Vega
Moca	Oneidys Lynnedis Victorio Fabere	21	173 cm 5 ft 8 in	Santo Domingo
Nagua	Alexandra Batista de López	22	176 cm 5 ft 9 in	Santo Domingo
Neiba	Vilma Agnes Tavarez Cristiano	19	178 cm 5 ft 10 in	Santo Domingo
Pedernales	Aleydis Amelia Collado de Zamora	17	179 cm 5 ft 10 in	Santo Domingo
Pedro Brand	Sofía Tatís Vargas	23	173 cm 5 ft 8 in	Pedro Brand
Puerto Plata	Rosa María Rosario Imbert	18	177 cm 5 ft 10 in	Sosúa
San Cristóbal	Denisse Aurelis Alvarado Fiallo	17	173 cm 5 ft 8 in	San Cristóbal
San Pedro de Macorís	Ana Aimeé González de Sued	23	175 cm 5 ft 9 in	San Pedro de Macorís
Santiago	Alexia Magdalena Lockhart Fermín	19	183 cm 6 ft 0 in	Tamboril
Sosúa	Laura Karina Imbert Mota	19	180 cm 5 ft 11 in	Sosúa
Valverde Mao	Laura del Carmen Acosta Chávez	24	180 cm 5 ft 11 in	Santiago de los Caballeros
Villa Bisonó	Carolina Reynoso Fabían	21	172 cm 5 ft 8 in	Santiago de los Caballeros
Villa González	Anyelika Rivera Javier	19	169 cm 5 ft 7 in	Santiago de los Caballeros

† After the first runner up sashed Patricia Bayonet in next year edition, Claudia Franjúl dies at the age of 20 in a car accident.
