= Miss Tierra República Dominicana 2005 =

- Date: July 30, 2005
- Venue: Hotel Jaragua, Santo Domingo, Dominican Republic
- Broadcaster: Telemicro 5
- Entrants: 25
- Winner: Amell Yoselín Santana de Jesús; Hato Mayor

Miss Tierra República Dominicana 2005 (translated as Miss Earth Dominican Republic 2005) was a national beauty pageant held in the Dominican Republic. A total of 25 candidates competed for the national crown, and the winner went on to represent the Dominican Republic at the Miss Earth 2005 pageant held in Manila, Philippines.

== Results ==
- Miss Tierra República Dominicana 2005 : Amell Yoselín Santana de Jesús (Hato Mayor)
- 1st Runner Up: Mariela Zamora (Vílla Bisonó)
- 2nd Runner Up: Carina Sousa (Neiba)
- 3rd Runner Up: Ana Hidalgo (Santiago)
- 4th Runner Up: Sandra Montas (San Pedro de Macorís)

Top 12

- Jelite Zamora (San Francisco de Macorís)
- Inelkis Ramos (La Romana)
- Mayra Rosario (Moca)
- Nidez de Paula (Com. Dom. Nueva York)
- Aura Castros (Puerto Plata)
- Morena Ruiz (Monte Cristi)
- Diana Santos (Valverde)

=== Special awards ===
- Miss Photogenic (voted by press reporters) - Tatiana Rojas (Salvaleón de Higüey)
- Miss Congeniality (voted by contestants) - Isaura Reynosa (Bonao)
- Best Face - Amell Santana (Hato Mayor)
- Best Provincial Costume - Casandra Mota (Santiago Rodríguez)
- Miss Cultura - Cesarina Ynoa (Com. Dom. Puerto Rico)
- Miss Elegancia - Mili de la Rosa (Azua)

== Delegates ==
Province, Mun., Community	Contestant	Age	Height	Hometown
Azua	Milagros de la Rosa Echeverria	22	6 ft 0 in 183 cm	Azua de Compostela
Bonao	Isaura Reynosa Tavarez	25	5 ft 8 in 173 cm	Juan Adrian
Com. Dom. Nueva York	Nidez de Paula Rey	19	5 ft 7 in 170 cm	Long Island
Com. Dom. Puerto Rico	Cesarina Ynoa Cañizarez	21	5 ft 8 in 173 cm	Bayamon
Cotuí	Livia Paniagua Mora	26	5 ft 10 in 178 cm	La Cueva
Distrito Nacional	Laura Tavarez Garzon	18	6 ft 0 in 183 cm	El Naco
El Seibo	Iris Soto Raosa	27	5 ft 9 in 175 cm	Santa Cruz de El Seibo
Hato Mayor	Amell Yoselín Santana de Jesús	18	6 ft 0 in 183 cm	Sabana de la Mar
Jimaní	Iolanda Sauri de los Santos	18	6 ft 0 in 183 cm	La Descubierta
La Romana	Inelkis Madale Ramos Ramos	25	5 ft 10 in 178 cm	Vílla Hermosa
La Vega	Sandra Roig Rodríguez	19	5 ft 11 in 180 cm	Constanza
Moca	Mayra Rosario Rolais	18	5 ft 8 in 173 cm	Moca
Monte Cristi	Ana Morena Ruiz Orda	23	5 ft 11 in 180 cm	Las Matas de Santa Cruz
Monte Plata	Raiza Almonte Nornoja	24	5 ft 7 in 170 cm	San Antonio de Yamasá
Neiba	Carina Sousa Algoas	21	5 ft 7 in 170 cm	Valle Nuevo
Puerto Plata	Aura Marie Castros Toledo	22	6 ft 0 in 183 cm	Los Hidalgos
Salvaleón de Higüey	Tatiana Magdalena Rojas Safrio	18	6 ft 2 in 188 cm	Punta Cana
Samaná	Lisa Mary Tatis Valle	18	6 ft 2 in 188 cm	El Limón
San Cristóbal	Eva Quiros Casanarez	23	5 ft 5 in 165 cm	San Cristóbal
San Francisco de Macorís	Jelite Zamora Raulos	22	5 ft 5 in 165 cm	San Francisco de Macorís
San Pedro de Macorís	Sandra Montas Lorano	21	5 ft 9 in 175 cm	San José de los Llanos
Santiago	Ana Hidalgo Alvarez	24	5 ft 9 in 175 cm	Tamboril
Santiago Rodríguez	Casandra Mota Rosa	23	5 ft 11 in 180 cm	Monción
Valverde	Diana Santos Ramos	20	5 ft 6 in 168 cm	Esperanza
Vílla Bisonó	Mariela Zamora Ferrano	18	5 ft 11 in 180 cm	Estancia del Yaque
