= Miss Tierra República Dominicana 2007 =

- Date: November 1, 2007
- Entertainment: El Jeffrey
- Venue: Auditorio del Hotel Dorada, Sosúa, Dominican Republic
- Broadcaster: TV de las Estrellas
- Entrants: 36
- Winner: Themys Aleska Febriel Tatís; Azua

The Miss Tierra República Dominicana 2007 pageant was held on November 1, 2007. This year, 36 candidates competed for the national crown. The winner represented the Dominican Republic at the Miss Earth 2007, which was held in Manila.

== Results ==
Final results	Contestant
Miss Tierra República Dominicana 2007	Azua - Themys Febriel
1st Runner-up	Cotuí - Ynalkis Reynoso
2nd Runner-up	La Vega - Janet de Soto
3rd Runner-up	Santiago - Velkis Fermin
4th Runner-up	San Francisco de Macorís - Cindy Rosal
Semi-finalists	Santiago Rodríguez - Cristina Matos; Puerto Plata - Leidi Rosario; Distrito Nacional - Eva Peralta; Hato Mayor - Alisa Meran; Samaná - Joany Safran; Jarabacoa - Luisa Franco; Neiba - Yudelka Ramírez

=== Special awards ===
- Miss Photogenic (voted by press reporters) - Rosilendis Santana (San Cristóbal)
- Miss Congeniality (voted by Miss Dominican Republic Universe contestants) - Somairis Aquino (El Seibo)
- Best Face - Denise Rollo (La Romana)
- Best Provincial Costume - Alicia Ramos (Valverde)
- Miss Cultura - Maryann Castro (San Pedro de Macorís)
- Miss Elegancia - Sandra Eros (Comendador)

== Delegates ==
Province, Mun., Community	Contestant	Age	Height	Hometown
Azua	Themys Aleska Febriel Tatís	18	6 ft 0 in 183 cm	Azua de Compostela
Baní	Carina Soto Laro	26	5 ft 7 in 170 cm	Santo Domingo
Barahona	Casandra de Lara Roso	22	5 ft 6 in 168 cm	Santo Domingo
Bonao	Katherine Cuello García	19	6 ft 0 in 183 cm	Bonao
Cabrera	Damaris Alvarado Mejía	24	5 ft 7 in 170 cm	Santo Domingo
Comendador	Sandra Eros de Jesús	24	5 ft 8 in 173 cm	San Juan de la Maguana
Constanza	Keyla Rodríguez Arce	18	6 ft 1 in 185 cm	Santo Domingo
Cotuí	Ynalkis Reynoso Valle	20	6 ft 0 in 183 cm	Santo Domingo
Dajabón	Iris Karina Also Luperon	25	5 ft 7 in 170 cm	Loma de Cabrera
Distrito Nacional	Eva Peralta Domingo	19	6 ft 2 in 188 cm	Santo Domingo
El Seibo	Somairis Aquino Ocoa	18	5 ft 8 in 173 cm	Santa Cruz de El Seibo
Hato Mayor	Alisa Meran Santos	20	6 ft 0 in 183 cm	Hato Mayor del Rey
Higüey	Irina Rojas	18	5 ft 6 in 168 cm	Santo Domingo
Jarabacoa	Luisa Franco Bisonó	26	5 ft 8 in 173 cm	Buena Vista
Jimaní	Carolina Fabian Aroyo	21	5 ft 10 in 178 cm	Neiba
La Romana	Denise Rollo Peña	23	5 ft 7 in 170 cm	La Romana
La Vega	Janet de Soto Zamora	23	5 ft 11 in 180 cm	Constanza
Moca	Eugenia Matos Ojeda	24	5 ft 5 in 165 cm	Moca
Monte Cristi	Yanielka Castellanos Vera	20	5 ft 8 in 173 cm	Santiago de los Caballeros
Monte Plata	Ada Ferrano Peralta	20	6 ft 0 in 183 cm	Sabana Grande de Boyá
Nagua	Linerka de las Palmas Fiallo	25	5 ft 11 in 180 cm	Santiago de los Caballeros
Neiba	Yudelka Ramírez de la Cruz	19	5 ft 9 in 175 cm	Neiba
Pedernales	Candy Lazaro Mella	23	5 ft 6 in 168 cm	Oviedo
Pedro Brand	Ana María González Escadon	27	6 ft 0 in 183 cm	Pedro Brand
Puerto Plata	Leidi Altagracia Rosario de Collado	18	6 ft 1 in 185 cm	Los Hidalgos
Salcedo	Viviana Marte Fabel	21	5 ft 8 in 173 cm	Santiago de los Caballeros
Samaná	Joany Safran Javier	24	5 ft 7 in 170 cm	Santa Bárbara de Samaná
San Cristóbal	Rosilendis Santana Fran	24	5 ft 8 in 173 cm	San Gregorio de Yaguate
San Francisco de Macorís	Cindy Rosal Castro	22	5 ft 11 in 180 cm	San Francisco de Macorís
San Jose de Ocoa	AnaSol Rossi Pena	17	5 ft 8 in 173 cm	Santo Domingo
San Juan	Ericka Ortiz Marto	24	5 ft 9 in 175 cm	San Juan de la Maguana
San Pedro de Macorís	Maryann Castro Lozano	21	5 ft 7 in 170 cm	San Pedro de Macorís
Santiago	Velkis Gabriela Fermin Tavarez	19	5 ft 10 in 178 cm	San José de las Matas
Santiago Rodríguez	Cristina Matos Oliva	21	5 ft 8 in 173 cm	Santiago de los Caballeros
Santo Domingo Este	Alexandra González de Jesús	23	5 ft 9 in 175 cm	Santo Domingo Este
Santo Domingo Norte	Rosany Evo Reyno	18	5 ft 7 in 170 cm	Villa Mella
Valverde	Alicia Ramos Acosta	28	6 ft 0 in 183 cm	Boca Chica
