= Miss Tierra República Dominicana 2008 =

- Date: June 17, 2008
- Venue: Teatro La Fiesta Renaissance Jaragua Hotel & Casino, Bávaro, Dominican Republic
- Broadcaster: TV de las Estrellas
- Entrants: 40
- Winner: Diana Carolina González Flores; San Francisco de Macorís

Miss Tierra República Dominicana 2008 pageant was held at the Teatro La Fiesta Renaissance Jaragua Hotel & Casino in Bávaro, Dominican Republic, on June 17, 2008.

At the end of the event, Diana Carolina González Flores of San Francisco de Macorís was crowned as Miss Earth Dominican Republic 2008. González represented the Dominican Republic at the Miss Earth 2008 beauty pageant, which was held in Manila. The Miss República Dominicana Ecoturismo will enter Miss Eco-Turismo 2008.

== Results ==
=== Placements ===
Placement	Contestant
Miss Tierra República Dominicana 2008	San Francisco de Macorís – Diana González
Miss República Dominicana Ecoturismo	Constanza – Julian Espinal
1st Runner-Up	Santo Domingo Norte – Joenly Capellán
2nd Runner-Up	Bonao - Nayelis García
3rd Runner-Up	Maimón – Esmirna Lasencia
4th Runner-Up	Monción – Michel Alvarado
Top 12	Santiago – Isaura Mendoza; Puerto Plata – Alfonsina González; Moca – Carolina Rosario; Santiago Rodríguez – Laura Cruz; Elías Piña – Carol Soler; Sosúa – Ibelise Peña

=== Special awards ===
- Miss Photogenic (voted by press reporters) - Evelin Periel (San Cristóbal)
- Miss Congeniality (voted by Miss Dominican Republic Universe contestants) - Fatima Reyes (Hermanas Mirabal)
- Miss Internet - Annè de la Cruz (Jarabacoa)
- Best Face - Diana Flores (San Francisco de Macorís)
- Best Provincial Costume - Ana Vinicio (Neiba)
- Miss Cultura - Marieli Sánchez (Dajabón)
- Miss Elegancia - Yatnna Alvares (Espaillat)
- Best Talent - Waleska de la Cruz (Santo Domingo Este)
- Best Representation of their Province or Municipality - Alfonsina González (Puerto Plata)

== Delegates ==
Province, Mun., Community	Contestant	Age	Height	Hometown
Azua	Paholi Peña Eros	19	5 ft 5 in 165 cm	Azua de Compostela
Barahona	Cinthia Arias Somara	25	5 ft 9 in 175 cm	Santa Cruz de Barahona
Bonao	Nayelis García Soriano	21	5 ft 10 in 178 cm	Bonao
Com. Dom. EU	Sandra Melo Cabrera	23	6 ft 0 in 183 cm	Raleigh
Com. Dom. Pto. Rico	Sofia Agustin Duarte	21	5 ft 8 in 173 cm	Aguadilla
Constanza	Julian Wendelyn Espinal Fiallo	18	5 ft 8 in 173 cm	Santo Domingo
Dajabón	Marieli Sánchez Javier	23	5 ft 7 in 170 cm	Dajabón
Distrito Nacional	Seily Magdalena Then Cabrera	19	6 ft 0 in 183 cm	Santo Domingo
Duarte	Gerladin Santiago Tejeda	18	5 ft 8 in 173 cm	Vílla Riva
El Cercado	Mildre Cabrera Fermin	26	5 ft 9 in 175 cm	Manoguayabo
Elías Piña	Carol Soler Llano	24	6 ft 0 in 183 cm	Santiago de los Caballeros
Espaillat	Yatnna Alvares Corona	21	6 ft 0 in 183 cm	Moca
Jarabacoa	Anne de la Cruz García	16	5 ft 11 in 180 cm	Jarabacoa
La Altagracia	Milagros Figueroa Salman	20	6 ft 3 in 191 cm	Bayahibe
La Vega	Yenifer Marinela Jiménez Burtanis	22	5 ft 11 in 180 cm	Jarabacoa
Licey al Medio	Carolina Paulino Hidalgo	23	5 ft 10 in 178 cm	Licey al Medio
Loma de Cabrera	Catherine Cuello Zamora	24	5 ft 6 in 168 cm	Santiago de los Caballeros
Maimón	Esmirna Lasencia Inoa	19	5 ft 11 in 180 cm	Boca Chica
María Trinidad Sánchez	Istria Soler Castanas	19	5 ft 7 in 170 cm	Santiago de los Caballeros
Moca	Carolina Arlene Rosario Ortega	26	6 ft 0 in 183 cm	Moca
Monción	Michelle Alvarado de la Cruz	22	5 ft 8 in 173 cm	Jaquimeyes
Monte Cristi	Elibeth Franco Yanoa	18	6 ft 0 in 183 cm	Santo Domingo
Monte Plata	Estefania Pérez Fermin	24	5 ft 9 in 175 cm	Sabana Grande de Boyá
Neiba	Ana del Carmen Vinicio Candelario	19	6 ft 2 in 188 cm	Neiba
Nizao	Noelis Tejeda Castro	20	5 ft 9 in 175 cm	Baní
Padre Las Casa	Rosmery Rosaura Rosario Rodríguez	18	6 ft 0 in 183 cm	Santo Domingo
Pedro Brand	Arelis Cruz Maruya	21	5 ft 9 in 175 cm	Pedro Brand
Peravia	Bella Nolasco Tavarez	22	5 ft 6 in 168 cm	Baní
Piedra Blanca	Elena María Silvestre Sousa	19	5 ft 7 in 170 cm	Bonao
Puerto Plata	Alfonsina Altagracia González Duarte	20	6 ft 0 in 183 cm	San Felipe de Puerto Plata
Salcedo	Fatima Reyes Escandon	23	6 ft 1 in 185 cm	Santo Domingo
Samaná	Yailin Casandra Días Ferrano	18	6 ft 1 in 185 cm	Santo Domingo
San Cristóbal	Evelin Periel Tavares	23	5 ft 7 in 170 cm	San Cristóbal
San Francisco de Macorís	Diana Carolina González Flores	18	5 ft 8 in 173 cm	San Francisco de Macorís
Santiago	Isaura Ines Mendoza Gracias	24	5 ft 10 in 178 cm	Santiago de los Caballeros
Santiago Rodríguez	Laura Cruz Reynoso	18	5 ft 11 in 180 cm	San Ignacio de Sabaneta
Santo Domingo Este	Waleska de la Cruz Espinoza	22	5 ft 11 in 180 cm	Santo Domingo
Santo Domingo Norte	Joenly Capellán Fario	22	5 ft 9 in 175 cm	Villa Mella
Sosúa	Ibelise Mary Peña Castellanos	20	5 ft 11 in 180 cm	Sosúa
Villa Altagracia	Dennys Erasmo de los Santos	21	5 ft 8 in 173 cm	Santo Domingo

== Trivia ==
- Miss Com. Dom. Puerto Rico entered in Miss DR 05.
- Miss Barahona would enter Miss Turismo Dominicana 2008
