= Miss Tierra República Dominicana 2006 =

Dominican beauty pageant

- Date: June 28, 2006
- Venue: Auditorio Cabo Nuevo, Santo Domingo Este, Dominican Republic
- Entrants: 42
- Placements: 15
- Debuts: Com. Dom. EU, Padre Las Casa, San José de Ocoa, Santo Domingo
- Winner: Alondra Peña; Puerto Plata

Miss Tierra República Dominicana 2006 was the sixth Miss Tierra República Dominicana pageant, held at the Auditorio Cabo Nuevo in Santo Domingo Este, Dominican Republic, on June 28, 2006.

At the end of the event, Alondra Peña of Puerto Plata was crowned Miss Tierra República Dominicana 2006. Peña represented the Dominican Republic at the Miss Earth 2006, which was held in Manila.

== Results ==
=== Placements ===
Placement	Contestant
Miss Tierra República Dominicana 2006	Puerto Plata – Alondra Peña
1st Runner-Up	Padre Las Casa – Sarah Albino
2nd Runner-Up	Nigua – Tatiana Sosa
3rd Runner-Up	United States – Fanny Alvarado
4th Runner-Up	Santiago – Livia Gordón
Top 10	Moca – Ana Garzón; Samaná – Sonia Ferreira; San José de Ocoa – Cristina de la Rosa; Santo Domingo – Sofia Quinteros; Tenares – Susie Matos
Top 15	Bonao – Laura Marino; Distrito Nacional – Sofy Lozano; Duarte – Sandra Abreu; San Pedro de Macorís – Joellina Castro; Tamboril – Janet Arce

=== Special awards ===
- Miss Photogenic (voted by press reporters) - Cinthia Tavarez (Elías Piña)
- Miss Congeniality (voted by contestants) - Karina Bisonó (Jimaní)
- Best Face - Susie Matos (Tenares)
- Best Provincial Costume - Reiny Ruiz (Valverde)
- Miss Cultura - Lisa Varoni (La Vega)
- Miss Elegancia - Gina Ferro (Santiago Rodríguez)

== Delegates ==
Represented	Contestant	Age	Height	Hometown
Azua	Alicia Fernández de la Cruz	23	1.68 m (5 ft 6 1/4 in)	Santo Domingo
Bonao	Laura Marino Zaragoza	25	1.73 m (5 ft 8 in)	Juma Bejucal
Cabrera	Luisa Mota de Arias	21	1.75 m (5 ft 9 in)	Cabrera
Cabarete	Mairy Oca Torres	22	1.75 m (5 ft 9 in)	San Felipe de Puerto Plata
Com. Dom. En EEUU	Fanny Carina Alvarado Alvarado	20	1.71 m (5 ft 7 1/4 in)	Nueva York
Cotuí	Selyna Hermoso Tosado	23	1.74 m (5 ft 8 1/2 in)	Cotuí
Dajabón	Lorena García Peralta	19	1.80 m (5 ft 10 3/4 in)	Dajabón
Distrito Nacional	Andreina Sofia Lozano Arias	18	1.83 m (6 ft 0 in)	Santo Domingo
Duarte	Sandra Abreu Camacho	26	1.68 m (5 ft 6 1/4 in)	San Francisco de Macorís
Elías Piña	Cinthia Tavarez Camaoyo	26	1.69 m (5 ft 6 1/2 in)	Santo Domingo
Guaymate	Ericka Ferro Cardona	25	1.74 m (5 ft 8 1/2 in)	Boca de Yuma
Higüey	Fania Royd Rojas	18	1.79 m (5 ft 10 1/2 in)	Bávaro
Isla Saona	Melissa Cabrera Polanco	20	1.78 m (5 ft 10 in)	Bayahibe
Jimaní	Karina Sofia Bisonó Eros	18	1.82 m (5 ft 11 3/4 in)	Santo Domingo
La Altagracia	Sandy Tavarez Ronosando	25	1.73 m (5 ft 8 in)	Punta Cana
La Vega	Ana Elisa Varoni Feralta	27	1.75 m (5 ft 9 in)	Santo Domingo
Las Matas de Santa Cruz	Loriel Zamora de Espaillat	20	1.77 m (5 ft 9 3/4 in)	Santo Domingo
Las Terrenas	Carolina Ynoa Walter	23	1.70 m (5 ft 7 in)	Sánchez
Maimón	Andrea Fermin Cabrera	21	1.69 m (5 ft 6 1/2 in)	Santo Domingo
Moca	Ana Garzon Ynoa	21	1.74 m (5 ft 8 1/2 in)	José Contreras
Monte Plata	Lucia Collado Collado	21	1.77 m (5 ft 9 3/4 in)	Sabana Grande de Boyá
Nigua	Tatiana Sosa de Reynosa	19	1.75 m (5 ft 9 in)	Sabana Iglesia
Nizao	Leida Rosa Arroyo	24	1.80 m (5 ft 10 3/4 in)	Santo Domingo
Padre Las Casa	Sarah Albino Colón	23	1.78 m (5 ft 10 in)	Santiago de los Caballeros
Pedernales	Samuelina Hidalgo Upia	23	1.85 m (6 ft 3/4 in)	Santo Domingo
Pedro Brand	Martina Abreu Abreu	18	1.76 m (5 ft 9 1/4 in)	Santo Domingo
Pimentel	Ana Hidalgo Ferro	20	1.72 m (5 ft 7 3/4 in)	San Francisco de Macorís
Puerto Plata	Alondra Peña Pacheco	18	1.82 m (5 ft 11 3/4 in)	Baní
Samaná	Sonia Ferreira Rey	24	1.88 m (6 ft 2 in)	Las Terrenas
San Cristóbal	Joana Germán Sosa	21	1.71 m (5 ft 7 1/4 in)	San Cristóbal
San José de Ocoa	Cristina de la Rosa Tavarez	23	1.67 m (5 ft 5 3/4 in)	Rancho Arriba
San Pedro de Macorís	Joellina Castro Germán	19	1.75 m (5 ft 9 in)	San Pedro de Macorís
Santiago	Ana Olivia Gordón Suarez	18	1.84 m (6 ft 1/2 in)	Jánico
Santiago Rodríguez	Gina Ferro Loazno	18	1.78 m (5 ft 10 in)	Santo Domingo
Santo Domingo	Ana Sofia Quinteros Zamora	24	1.76 m (5 ft 9 1/4 in)	Santo Domingo Norte
Tamboril	Janet Arce Carrajíllo	24	1.80 m (5 ft 10 3/4 in)	Tamboril
Tenares	Susana Matos Cristóbal	23	1.66 m (5 ft 5 1/4 in)	Blanco
Valverde	Corina Agnes Valderrama Mora	19	1.81 m (5 ft 11 1/4 in)	Santo Domingo
Villa Altagracia	Karina Torres Zamora	25	1.73 m (5 ft 8 in)	San Cristóbal
Vílla Mella	Maira Gómez Correa	21	1.70 m (5 ft 7 in)	Villa Mella
Villa Tapia	Luisa Medina Arrea	26	1.83 m (6 ft 0 in)	Santo Domingo
Villa Vásquez	Eva Carina Mena Zaragoza	18	1.80 m (5 ft 10 3/4 in)	Santo Domingo
