= Miss Tierra República Dominicana 2004 =

- Date: June 20, 2004
- Venue: Auditorio de los Encantos Buena Vista, La Romana, Dominican Republic
- Entrants: 25
- Winner: Nileny Dippton Estevez; Santiago Rodríguez

The Miss Tierra República Dominicana 2004 pageant was held on June 20, 2004. This year, 25 candidates competed for the national crown. The winner represented the Dominican Republic at the Miss Earth 2004, which was held in Manila.

== Results ==
=== Placements ===
Placement	Contestant
Miss Tierra República Dominicana 2004	Santiago Rodríguez – Nileny Estevez Dippton
1st Runner-Up	Puerto Rico – Laura Fabre
2nd Runner Up	Santiago – Rachel Zafrio
3rd Runner Up	Puerto Plata – Carina Almeida
4th Runner Up	Samaná – Wilma Pérez
Top 12	Niurca de Mota (La Vega); Sofya Arces (Distrito Nacional); Clara Abreu (Cotuí); Ana Rivera (San Cristóbal); Mily Sosa (Hato Mayor); Janet Mora (Monte Plata); Lisa Matos (San Pedro de Macorís)

=== Special awards ===
- Miss Photogenic (voted by press reporters) - Andrea Ferro (San Francisco de Macorís)
- Miss Congeniality (voted by contestants) - Margarita Ramos (Valverde)
- Best Face - Laura Fabre (Com. Dom. Puerto Rico)
- Best Provincial Costume - Carina Almeida (Puerto Plata)
- Miss Cultura - Janet Mora (Monte Plata)
- Miss Elegancia - Clara Abreu (Cotuí)

== Delegates ==
Province, Mun., Community	Contestant	Age	Height	Hometown
Azua	Lorena Luisa Aroyo Almos	27	5 ft 8 in 173 cm	Las Yayas de Viajama
Bonao	Milvia Castros Mayor	21	6 ft 0 in 183 cm	Juan Adrián
Com. Dom. Nueva York	Martha Morillo Castellanos	25	5 ft 7 in 170 cm	New York City
Com. Dom. Puerto Rico	Laura Mary Fabre Matos	18	5 ft 10 in 178 cm	Ponce
Cotuí	Clara Milena Abreu Abreu	24	5 ft 11 in 180 cm	Cevicos
Distrito Nacional	Sofya Arces Alcantara	18	5 ft 7 in 170 cm	Mendoza
El Seibo	Ema de Lara Tavarez	18	5 ft 10 in 178 cm	Miches
Hato Mayor	Milagros Sosa Tavarez	22	6 ft 0 in 183 cm	El Valle
Jimaní	Cindy Marina Rays de Castro	18	5 ft 11 in 180 cm	Postrer Río
La Romana	Rafelina Suarez Alcarrizos	20	5 ft 5 in 165 cm	La Romana
La Vega	Niurca de Mota Peradron	18	5 ft 8 in 173 cm	Jarabacoa
Moca	Evangelina Alma Pichardo Collado	24	6 ft 2 in 188 cm	Moca
Monte Plata	Janet Agnes Mora Lavos	21	6 ft 1 in 185 cm	San Rafael de Monte Plata
Puerto Plata	Carina Manuela Almeida de la Cruz	19	6 ft 0 in 183 cm	Imbert
Salvaleón de Higüey	Sandra Carolina Bello Zamora	20	6 ft 0 in 183 cm	Mano Juan
Samaná	Wilma Perez Valle	23	5 ft 11 in 180 cm	Valle de Samaná
San Cristóbal	Ana Celeste Rivera Ramos	19	5 ft 9 in 175 cm	San Gregorio de Nigua
San Francisco de Macorís	Andrea Ferro Caroea	26	5 ft 8 in 173 cm	Las Guáranas
San Pedro de Macorís	Lisa Magdalena Matos Lora	21	5 ft 10 in 178 cm	Ramón Santana
Santiago	Rachel Zafrio Vargas	23	5 ft 6 in 168 cm	Navarrete
Santiago Rodríguez	Nileny Estevez Dippton	21	5 ft 9 in 175 cm	San Ignacio de Sabaneta
Valverde	Margarita Ramos Polanco	28	5 ft 11 in 180 cm	Esperanza
