= Miss Tierra República Dominicana 2011 =

- Date: October 14, 2011
- Presenters: Themys Febriel and Wilkins Vásquez
- Venue: Renaissance Auditorio de Festival del Hotel Jaragua, Santo Domingo, Dominican Republic
- Broadcaster: Telemicro
- Entrants: 33
- Winner: Sarah Patricia Féliz Mok; Monseñor Nouel
- Congeniality: Sarah Féliz (Monseñor Nouel)
- Photogenic: Breini Feliz (Barahona)

The Miss Tierra República Dominicana 2011 pageant was held on October 14, 2011. This year 33 candidates competed for the national earth crown. The winner represented the Dominican Republic at the Miss Earth 2011 beauty pageant, which was held in the Philippines.

== Results ==
| Final results | Contestant |
|---|---|
| Miss Tierra República Dominicana 2011 | Monseñor Nouel - Sarah Féliz |
| 1st Runner-up | San Juan - Veronica Batista |
| 2nd Runner-up | Santiago - Dairys Vargas |
| 3rd Runner-up | Independencia - Alba Polanco |
| 4th Runner-up | Peravia - Jatnna Mármol |
| 5th Runner-up | Duarte - Rut López |
| Top 14 | Azua - Yesica Encarnación; Bahoruco - Mirian Florián; La Romana - Isabel Trinidad; María Trinidad Sánchez - Paola Frometa; Puerto Plata - Franchesca Castillo; San José de Ocoa - Shirley Abud; Santiago Rodríguez - Flor Sosa; Valverde - Natividad Ventura |

=== Special awards ===
- Miss Photogenic (voted by press reporters) - Breini Feliz (Barahona)
- Miss Congeniality (voted by contestants) - Sarah Féliz (Monseñor Nouel)
- Best Face - Veronica Batista (San Juan)
- Miss Cultura - Idelkis Sierra (Distrito Nacional)

== Delegates ==
| Represents | Contestant | Age | Height | Hometown |
|---|---|---|---|---|
| Azua | Yesica Encarnación Melo | 20 | 1.71 m (5 ft 7 1/4 in) | Santo Domingo |
| Bahoruco | Mirian Florián Vargas | 23 | 1.74 m (5 ft 8 1/2 in) | Neiba |
| Barahona | Breini Feliz Cristóbal | 19 | 1.69 m (5 ft 6 1/2 in) | Santo Domingo |
| Com. Dom. En EEUU | Yuleisy Mejía Jardínes | 18 | 1.77 m (5 ft 9 3/4 in) | Bronx |
| Dajabón | Alejandra Canela Gómez | 22 | 1.74 m (5 ft 8 1/2 in) | Santiago de los Caballeros |
| Distrito Nacional | Idelkis Sierra Then | 21 | 1.75 m (5 ft 9 in) | Santo Domingo |
| Duarte | Rut Estel López Vargas | 24 | 1.77 m (5 ft 9 3/4 in) | San Francisco de Macorís |
| El Seibo | Estefani Corporan León | 20 | 1.72 m (5 ft 7 3/4 in) | Santo Domingo |
| Elías Piña | Talisbeth Fortuna Vásquez | 21 | 1.75 m (5 ft 9 in) | Santo Domingo |
| Espaillat | Ana Lourdes González Leo | 23 | 1.76 m (5 ft 9 1/4 in) | Moca |
| Hato Mayor | Scarlet María Súarez Mateo | 19 | 1.68 m (5 ft 6 1/4 in) | Santo Domingo |
| Hermanas Mirabal | Dahiana Villalona Reynoso | 24 | 1.77 m (5 ft 9 3/4 in) | San Francisco de Macorís |
| Independencia | Alba Lucía Polanco Mota | 22 | 1.80 m (5 ft 10 3/4 in) | Santo Domingo Este |
| La Altagracia | Ambra Solesin Solimán | 21 | 1.75 m (5 ft 9 in) | Salvaleón de Higüey |
| La Romana | Isabel Lariel Trinidad Morán | 23 | 1.71 m (5 ft 7 1/4 in) | San Pedro de Macorís |
| La Vega | Katherine Cordero Ynoa | 18 | 1.73 m (5 ft 8 in) | Santiago de los Caballeros |
| María Trinidad Sánchez | Paola Frometa Tejada | 21 | 1.77 m (5 ft 9 3/4 in) | Santo Domingo Este |
| Monseñor Nouel | Sarah Patricia Féliz Mok | 23 | 1.79 m (5 ft 10 1/2 in) | Neiba |
| Monte Cristi | Jinette Suero Osvaldo | 20 | 1.76 m (5 ft 9 1/4 in) | Santo Domingo |
| Monte Plata | Jennifer Lara Amaya | 18 | 1.74 m (5 ft 8 1/2 in) | Santo Domingo |
| Pedernales | Angelica Batista Criollo | 24 | 1.81 m (5 ft 11 1/4 in) | Santo Domingo Este |
| Peravia | Jatnna Mármol Santiago | 19 | 1.74 m (5 ft 8 1/2 in) | Baní |
| Puerto Plata | Franchesca Castillo Majtula | 23 | 1.83 m (6 ft 0 in) | Santiago de los Caballeros |
| Samaná | Dasiel Batista Pichardo | 19 | 1.70 m (5 ft 7 in) | Santiago de los Caballeros |
| San Cristóbal | Yamilca Peralta Caucedo | 25 | 1.75 m (5 ft 9 in) | Santo Domingo |
| San José de Ocoa | Shirley Abud Hernández | 20 | 1.77 m (5 ft 9 3/4 in) | Santo Domingo |
| San Juan | Veronica Batista Ríos | 23 | 1.78 m (5 ft 10 in) | Santo Domingo |
| San Pedro de Macorís | Ana Esperanza Ruiz Cid | 18 | 1.71 m (5 ft 7 1/4 in) | San Pedro de Macorís |
| Sanchez Ramírez | Glenys Toribio Paulino | 21 | 1.69 m (5 ft 6 1/2 in) | Santiago de los Caballeros |
| Santiago | Dairys Vargas de los Santos | 18 | 1.82 m (5 ft 11 3/4 in) | Santiago de los Caballeros |
| Santiago Rodríguez | Flor Sosa Montesdeoca | 22 | 1.75 m (5 ft 9 in) | Santiago de los Caballeros |
| Jarabacoa | Liana Marinel Estrella Guzman | 17 | 1.75 m (5 ft 9 in) | Jarabacoa |
| Valverde | Natividad Ventura Pontevedra | 20 | 1.71 m (5 ft 7 1/4 in) | Santiago de los Caballeros |

== Crossovers ==
Contestants who previously competed at other beauty pageants or are expected to:

Miss Dominican Republic 2010

- Monseñor Nouel: Sarah Féliz (as Miss Bahoruco)
