= Miss Tierra República Dominicana 2010 =

- Date: October 12, 2010
- Presenters: Themys Febriel and Wilkins Vásquez
- Venue: Auditorio del Hotel Lina, Santo Domingo Este, Dominican Republic
- Broadcaster: Telemicro
- Entrants: 30
- Winner: Wisleidy Osorio Guzmán; Samaná
- Congeniality: Vicky Burgos (Pedernales)
- Best National Costume: Wisleidy Osorio (Samaná)
- Photogenic: Yulenny Valdéz (La Romana)

The Miss Tierra República Dominicana 2010 pageant was held on October 12, 2010. This year 30 candidates competed for the national earth crown. The winner represented the Dominican Republic at the Miss Earth 2010 beauty pageant, which was held in Vietnam.

== Results ==
Final results	Contestant
Miss Tierra República Dominicana 2010	Samaná - Wisleidy Osorio
1st Runner-up	Valverde - Carla Cabreja
2nd Runner-up	Santiago - Perla del Rio
3rd Runner-up	Dajabón - Verónica Guzmán
4th Runner-up	Pedernales - Vicky Burgos
Top 10	Puerto Plata - Zarina Santos; Bahoruco - Anny Medina; Monte Cristi - Stephanie Martínez; Santiago Rodríguez - Yudelka Almonte; Independencia - Genesis Sánchez
Top 15	Barahona - Olina Mora; María Trinidad Sánchez - Summer del Rosario; San José de Ocoa - Valeria Alcántara; La Romana - Yulenny Valdéz; La Altagracia - Leidy Beco

=== Special awards ===
- Miss Photogenic (voted by press reporters) - Yulenny Valdéz (La Romana)
- Miss Congeniality (voted by contestants) - Vicky Burgos (Pedernales)
- Best Face - Wisleidy Osorio (Samaná)
- Best Provincial Costume - Wisleidy Osorio (Samaná)
- Miss Cultura - Ninoska Serrano (Espaillat)
- Miss Elegancia - María Tavarez (Azua)
- Best Representation of their Province or Municipality - Perla del Rio (Santiago)

== Delegates ==
Represents	Contestant	Age	Height	Hometown
Azua	María Patricia Tavarez	18	1.75 m (5 ft 9 in)	Santo Domingo
Bahoruco	Anny Patricia Medina	21	1.71 m (5 ft 7 1/4 in)	Santo Domingo
Barahona	Olina Mora Noboa	24	1.75 m (5 ft 9 in)	Santiago de los Caballeros
Comunidad Dom. En EEUU	Ericka Sánchez Mateo	25	1.81 m (5 ft 11 1/4 in)	Miami
Dajabón	Verónica Guzmán	20	1.70 m (5 ft 7 in)	Santiago de los Caballeros
Distrito Nacional	Eva Lagrange Soto	22	1.83 m (6 ft 0 in)	Santo Domingo
Duarte	Duberky de Jesús Evangelista	19	1.79 m (5 ft 10 1/2 in)	San Francisco de Macorís
Espaillat	Ninoska Serrano Camacho	19	1.62 m (5 ft 3 3/4 in)	Moca
Hato Mayor	Karina Brito Cornielle	21	1.78 m (5 ft 10 in)	San Cristóbal
Independencia	Genesis Sánchez	20	1.77 m (5 ft 9 3/4 in)	Santo Domingo
La Altagracia	Leidy Beco	18	1.71 m (5 ft 7 1/4 in)	Santiago de los Caballeros
La Romana	Yulenny Valdéz	21	1.75 m (5 ft 9 in)	La Romana
La Vega	Yzanet Ayala	23	1.76 m (5 ft 9 1/4 in)	Santiago de los Caballeros
María Trinidad Sánchez	Summer Alina del Rosario	22	1.78 m (5 ft 10 in)	Nagua
Monte Cristi	Stephanie Martínez	21	1.81 m (5 ft 11 1/4 in)	Santo Domingo
Monte Plata	Valeria Ozuna Claudio	22	1.82 m (5 ft 11 3/4 in)	Santo Domingo
Pedernales	Ruht Victoria Burgos	20	1.82 m (5 ft 11 3/4 in)	Tamboril
Peravia	Yelissa Pimentel Cruz	21	1.79 m (5 ft 10 1/2 in)	Baní
Piedra Blanca	Leidy Reinoso	24	1.80 m (5 ft 10 3/4 in)	Santo Domingo
Puerto Plata	Zarina Santos Rosario	18	1.84 m (6 ft 1/2 in)	San Felipe de Puerto Plata
Salcedo	Emicily Montaño	20	1.74 m (5 ft 8 1/2 in)	Santiago de los Caballeros
Samaná	Wisleidy Osorio Guzmán	25	1.71 m (5 ft 7 1/4 in)	Santo Domingo Este
San Cristóbal	Elimayaly Joseph	23	1.78 m (5 ft 10 in)	San Cristóbal
San Francisco de Macorís	Ana María Tavarez	20	1.77 m (5 ft 9 3/4 in)	San Francisco de Macorís
San José de Ocoa	Valeria Alcántara	25	1.71 m (5 ft 7 1/4 in)	San José de Ocoa
San Pedro de Macorís	Martha de los Santos	20	1.75 m (5 ft 9 in)	Santo Domingo
Santiago	Perla Sofía del Rio Baéz	23	1.83 m (6 ft 0 in)	Santiago de los Caballeros
Santiago Rodríguez	Yudelka Almonte Reyes	20	1.77 m (5 ft 9 3/4 in)	Santiago de los Caballeros
Santo Domingo	Anelsys Altagracia Taveras	20	1.67 m (5 ft 5 3/4 in)	Santo Domingo
Valverde	Carla Cabreja Ulloa	21	1.72 m (5 ft 7 3/4 in)	Santo Domingo
