= Vielka Valenzuela =

Dominican-American TV host and beauty pageant titleholder

- Born: Vielka Veronica Valenzuela Lama; November 7, 1972 (age 53); Junumucu
- Occupations: Actress, model
- Presenting career
- Show: Hoy
- Show: Estrella Hoy
- Network: Estrella TV
- Website
- Height: 5 ft 10.7 in (1.80 m)
- Beauty pageant titleholder
- Title: Miss Dominican Republic 1994
- Hair color: Black
- Eye color: Green
- Major competitions: Miss Dominican Republic 1994 (Winner); Miss Universe 1994

Vielka Veronica Valenzuela Lama (born November 7, 1972 in New York, New York, U.S.) is an American-Dominican TV host and beauty pageant titleholder who won Miss Dominican Republic 1994 and competed at Miss Universe 1994. Raised in Concepción de la Vega, Dominican Republic, she worked in television in the Dominican Republic prior to moving to Mexico where she worked in telenovelas. She hosted Hoy and now hosts the show Estrellas hoy that airs on Estrella TV.
