= Jennifer Rocio Ventura Marte =

Dominican beauty pageant titleholder

Jennifer Ventura
- Ventura at Miss Universe 2025
- Education: Universidad Iberoamericana; Florida International University; IMF Smart Education
- Occupations: Civil engineer Business executive
- Beauty pageant titleholder
- Title: Miss Dominican Republic 2025
- Major competitions: Miss Dominican Republic 2025 (winner); Miss Universe 2025 (Top 30)

Jennifer Rocio Ventura Marte is a Dominican civil engineer and beauty pageant titleholder who won Miss Dominican Republic 2025. She represented the Dominican Republic at Miss Universe 2025, where she reached the Top 30.

== Early life, education and career ==
Ventura is from Barahona, Dominican Republic. She completed a dual-degree program in civil engineering through the Universidad Iberoamericana (UNIBE) and Florida International University (FIU). She later earned a master's degree in business management from IMF Smart Education in Madrid, Spain, and completed professional diplomas in building safety, risk assessment, senior management and project management.

Ventura works as a civil engineer and is chief executive of Ventmar, a construction company.

== Pageantry ==
=== Miss Dominican Republic 2025 ===
On 10 August 2025, Ventura represented Barahona at Miss Dominican Republic, held at the Teatro Nacional Eduardo Brito in Santo Domingo. She won the title from a field of 29 contestants, succeeding Celinee Santos.

Her win was the first for Barahona in 40 years; the province's previous titleholder, Melba Altagracia Vicens, had won in 1985.

Ventura's mother, Roselin Marte Nova, died in the Jet Set nightclub roof collapse on 8 April 2025. Ventura dedicated her participation in the national pageant to her mother's memory.

=== Miss Universe 2025 ===
Ventura represented the Dominican Republic at Miss Universe 2025 in Pak Kret, Thailand. She advanced to the Top 30.

== Advocacy ==
During her reign, Ventura advocated for the inclusion of people with autism and for compliance with safety regulations in the construction industry.
