= Rosalba García =

Dominican model (born 1992)

Sal García
- Born: Rosalba Abreu García; November 18, 1992 (age 33); Maimón, Dominican Republic
- Height: 1.88 m (6 ft 2 in)
- Beauty pageant titleholder
- Title: Miss Dominican Republic 2016
- Hair color: Dark brown
- Eye color: Dark brown
- Major competitions: Miss Dominican Republic 2016 (winner); Miss Universe 2016 (unplaced)

Rosalba "Sal" Abreu García (born November 18, 1992) is a Dominican model and beauty pageant titleholder who won Miss Dominican Republic 2016. She represented her country at the Miss Universe 2016 pageant.

== Early life ==
García was born in Maimón. She is an international model who has modeled for various Dominican fashion brands for many years. She has appeared on the covers of Oh Magazine and Elite Europe. At age 14, Sal García was discovered by Sandro Guzmán, the president of Management for Elite Models at its Paris, New York City and Barcelona branches. Later, García signed with Red Model Management in New York, Hollywood Model Management in Los Angeles, and Leni Model Management in London.

== Career ==
García has modeled for designers and fashion houses from around the world including Jean-Paul Gaultier, Salvatore Ferragamo, Gucci, Prada, Carolina Herrera, Elie Saab, Naeem Khan, and Oscar de la Renta.

In 2015, she walked in the Mercedes-Benz Fashion Week New York for brands and designers like Venexiana, Katia Leonovich, Ødd, TheblondsNY, Azède Jean-Pierre, David Tlale, and Farah Angsana. That same year, García appeared in New York Fashion Week, where she participated in the final runway of Kelly Dempsey in season 14 of the reality show Project Runway.

== Pageantry ==
=== Miss Dominican Republic 2016 ===
García was crowned as Miss Dominican Republic 2016 on April 24, 2016 at the Hotel Jaragua in the city of Santo Domingo.

=== Miss Universe 2016 ===
García represented the Dominican Republic at the Miss Universe 2016 pageant but finished unplaced.

Awards and achievements
Preceded by Clarissa Molina	Miss Dominican Republic; 2016	Succeeded by Carmen Muñoz Guzmán
Preceded by First edition	Miss Municipio Maimón; 2016	Succeeded by Incumbent
