= Ruth Ocumárez =

Dominican Republic model (born 1981)

- Born: Ruth Amelia Ocumárez Apataño; December 10, 1981 (age 44); Santo Domingo, Dominican Republic
- Height: 5 ft 10 in (1.78 m)
- Beauty pageant titleholder
- Title: Miss Dominican Republic 2002
- Hair color: Brown
- Eye color: Brown
- Major competitions: Miss Dominican Republic 2002 (Winner); Miss Universe 2002 (Unplaced) (3rd Place – Best National Costume)

Ruth Amelia Ocumárez y Apataño (born 10 December 1981 in Santo Domingo) is a Dominican actress, model and beauty pageant titleholder. Born and raised in Santo Domingo, Ocumárez became a celebrity in her nation by becoming the first woman of predominantly African heritage to represent the Dominican Republic at Miss Universe.

Due to her dark complexion and “bubbly” personality, she was given the nickname "La Diosa de Ébano" (English: The Ebony Goddess) by the Dominican public and press along with the general expectation of assured placement on coronation night.

== The award of Ruth Ocumarez ==
At the height of Miss Universe 2002 pageant, Ocumárez was predicted by many to be place as a semi-finalist.

To the great surprise of many pageant connoisseurs, Ocumarez did not place, causing many internet bloggers to coin the pageant term the Ruth Ocumárez Award to signify a pageant contestant who seems guaranteed to be a finalist, but didn't make the maximum entry at the initial placement selections of the pageant.

Accordingly, pageant candidates who gained placement or "special awards" (i.e. Miss Photogenic, Miss Friendship, Miss Congeniality, Best in Swimsuit, Best in Long Gown) does not classify for this award.

== Career ==
After her reign was over, Ocumárez entered the world of modeling and appeared in many Dominican, European, and Puerto Rican periodicals. She also branched out into acting, starring in the Dominican film Perico Ripiao. Besides her work in film, Ocumárez also has experience as a television hostess on Puerto Rican television.

It was reported in 2007 that Ocumárez had become engaged to flamboyant entertainment personality Sixto Nolasco. Nolasco, who was interviewed by journalist Carmen Jovet declared that he was "tired of being gay," and that he intends to start a family with his new wife. To date, there has been no formal announcement of the proposed nuptials.

Preceded by Claudia Cruz de los Santos	Miss Dominican Republic; 2002	Succeeded by Amelia Vega
