= Aldy Bernard =

Miss Dominican Republic 2018

- Born: Aldy María Bernard Bonilla; July 5, 1995 (age 31); Laguna Salada, Valverde, Dominican Republic
- Height: 1.82 m (6 ft 0 in)
- Beauty pageant titleholder
- Title: Miss Dominican Republic 2018
- Hair color: Brown
- Eye color: Honey
- Major competitions: Miss Dominican Republic 2018 (Winner); Miss Universe 2018 (Unplaced)

Aldy María Bernard Bonilla (born 5 July 1995) is a Dominican model, entrepreneur, and beauty pageant titleholder who was crowned Miss Dominican Republic 2018 and went on to compete at the Miss Universe 2018 pageant in Thailand.Representing her hometown of Laguna Salada, she also won the Best Traditional Costume award.

Beginning her modeling career at age 16, she has walked the runway for national designers and major international fashion houses, including Jean Paul Gaultier and Salvatore Ferragamo. She is a graduate of the Escuela Nacional de Locución Profesor Otto Rivera with a degree in mass communication. Bernard is also the founder of the dulce de leche business, Doña Ligia, a dulce de leche business based on her grandmother's traditional recipe.

== Career ==
As a model, Bernard signed with Ossygeno Models Management, she has walked the runway for Dominican designers such as Leonel Lirio, Giannina Azar, and Jusef Sánchez. Other than modeling, she is also running a dulce de leche business, Doña Ligia, which she founded based on her grandmother's recipe, Ligia Bonilla.

== Pageantry ==
=== Miss Dominican Republic 2018 ===
Bernard was crowned as Miss Dominican Republic 2018 on 26 August 2018 at the Gran Arena del Cibao, Santiago de los Caballeros, representing Laguna Salada which made her compete in Miss Universe 2018 in Thailand. She also got Best Traditional costume during the event and was crowned by Carmen Muñoz, Miss Dominican Republic Universe 2017.

Awards and achievements
Preceded by Carmen Muñoz Guzmán	Miss Dominican Republic; 2018	Succeeded by Clauvid Dály
