= Amell Santana =

Dominican beauty pageant contestant (born 1987)

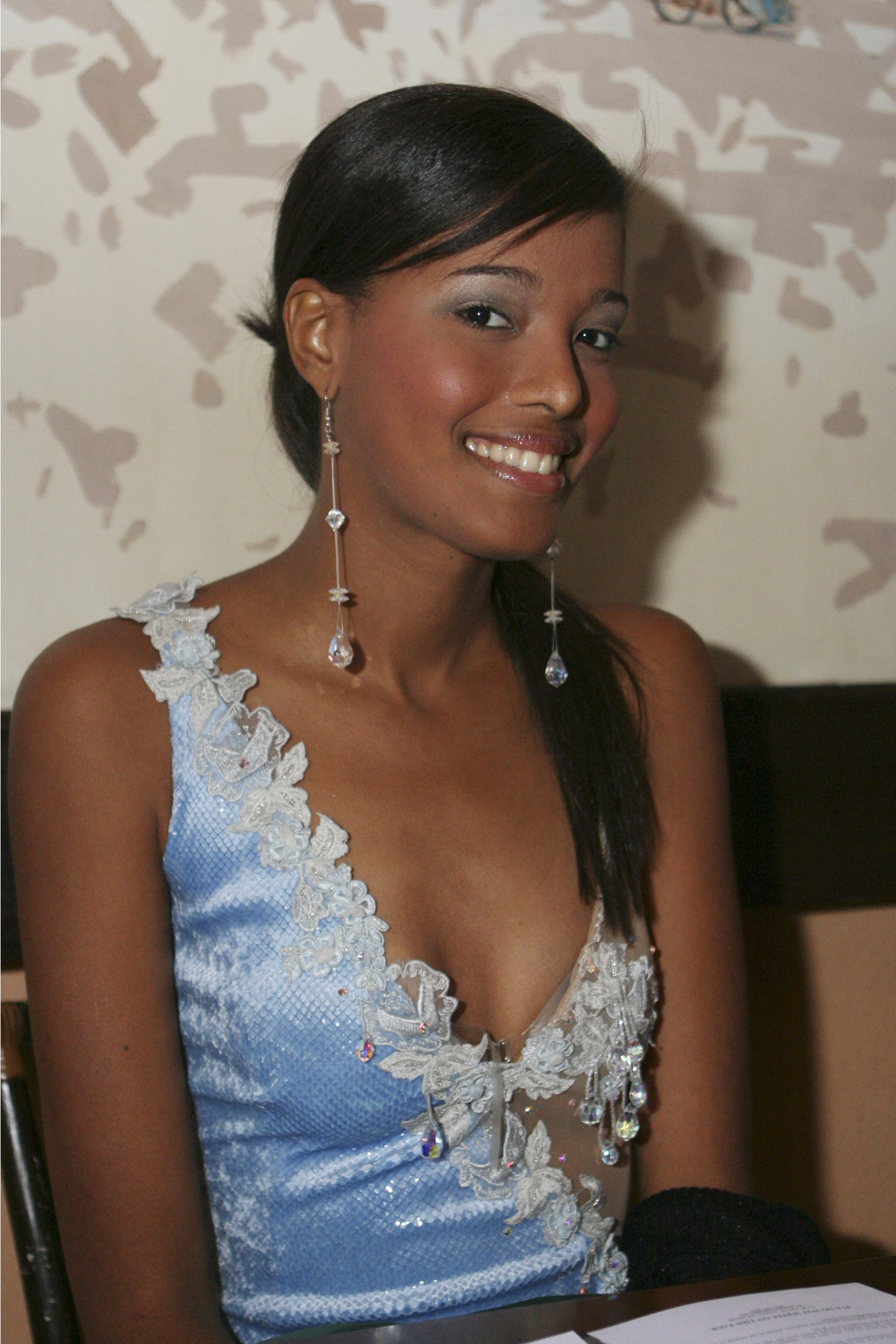
- Amell Santana in October 2005
- Born: Amell Yoselin Santana de Jesus; July 30, 1987 (age 39); Sabana de la Mar, Dominican Republic
- Height: 1.87 m (6 ft 1 1/2 in)
- Beauty pageant titleholder
- Title: Miss Tierra República Dominicana 2005; Miss Earth Air 2005
- Hair color: Brown
- Eye color: Black
- Major competitions: Miss Dominican Republic 2005; (1st Runner-Up); Miss Tierra República Dominicana 2005; (Winner); Miss Earth 2005; (Miss Earth – Air)

Amell Santa de Jesus (born July 30, 1987 in Sabana de la Mar) is a Dominican model and beauty pageant titleholder. She competed in Miss Dominican Republic Universe 2005, representing the province of Hato Mayor and ended as 1st runner-up. Santana then competed in Miss Dominican Republic 2005 and also placed as 1st runner-up. Receiving most of the judge votes, she was crowned as Miss Tierra República Dominicana 2005. A few months later, she represented the Dominican Republic in the 2005 Miss Earth pageant, placing as 1st runner-up. This the first contestant and the highest replacement of Dominican Republic.

Preceded by Nileny Estevez Dippton	Miss Tierra República Dominicana; 2005	Succeeded by Alondra Peña
