= Villa Hermosa =

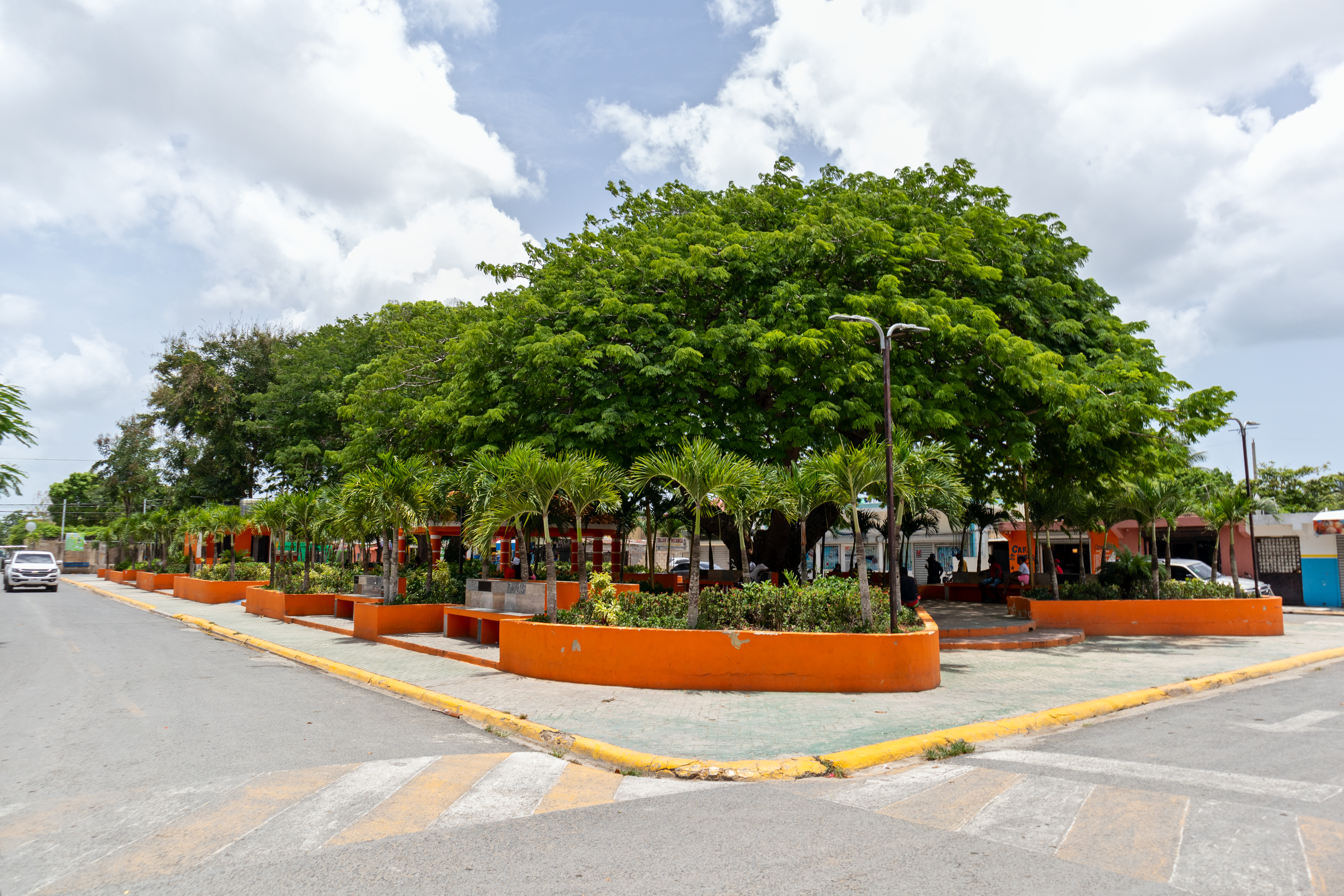

- Location within the Dominican Republic
- Coordinates: 18°34′48″N 68°58′48″W
- Country: Dominican Republic
- Province: La Romana

Area
  - Total: 158.63 km^{2} (61.25 sq mi)

Population (2022 census)
  - Total: 117,445
  - Density: 740.37/km^{2} (1,917.6/sq mi)
- Municipal Districts: 1

Villa Hermosa is a satellite city of La Romana in the Dominican Republic. Villa Hermosa's population live from small businesses in the same area as electricity services, supermarkets, beauty centers and other.

== Sources ==
- – World-Gazetteer.com
