= Guaymate =

- Location within the Dominican Republic
- Coordinates: 18°34′48″N 68°58′48″W
- Country: Dominican Republic
- Province: La Romana

Area
  - Total: 309.80 km^{2} (119.61 sq mi)

Population (2012)
  - Total: 26,133
  - Density: 84.354/km^{2} (218.48/sq mi)
  - Urban: 5,256
- Municipal Districts: 0

Guaymate is a municipality in La Romana province of the Dominican Republic. It is situated in the middle of Yuma Region, found approximately 20 kilometers from the city of La Romana in the eastern region of the country. It became a municipality on February 27, 1963, and continues to be part of the province of La Romana. La Romana Province.

Today, with its unique characteristics, Guaymate prepares to awake from the dream in which it has slept for many years. Guaymate continues to expand, and thanks to land made available by the mayor and other city authorities, the northern part of town has experienced some significant growth.

According to many, the name Guaymate originated from the name of a tree that was very common in the mountains of the region. The name of the tree was guamate. The first inhabitants of the town decided to add the letter "y" between the "a" and the "m", and the name Guaymate was born. Let it known that this is only a legend, and that as it happens with many names, the true origin of the name may never be known. The name Guaymate was accepted when the town became part of the province of La Romana.

Guaymate has been the birthplace of many outstanding baseball players. Surnames such as Quezada and De Aza, could be identified as having their roots in Guaymate.

Today Guaymate has many shopping places where laborers from the Central Romana (a sugar cane refinery) go to do their shopping. Every weekend people come to town to do their weekly shopping.

== Sources ==
- Municipio de Guaymate
- – World-Gazetteer.com
