= San Gregorio de Nigua =

- Nigua in the Dominican Republic
- Coordinates: 18°22′48″N 70°04′48″W
- Country: Dominican Republic
- Province: San Cristóbal

Area
  - Total: 48.76 km^{2} (18.83 sq mi)

Population (2012)
  - Total: 40,589
  - Density: 832.4/km^{2} (2,156/sq mi)
- Municipal Districts: 0

San Gregorio de Nigua is a municipality (municipio) of the San Cristóbal province in the Dominican Republic.
