= Pedro Brand =

- Pedro Brand in the Dominican Republic
- Coordinates: 18°34′0″N 70°5′28″W
- Country: Dominican Republic
- Province: Santo Domingo

Area
  - Total: 212.29 km^{2} (81.97 sq mi)

Population (2012)
  - Total: 103,685
  - Density: 488.41/km^{2} (1,265.0/sq mi)
- Municipal Districts: 2

Pedro Brand is a municipality (municipio) of the Santo Domingo province in the Dominican Republic. Within the municipality there are two municipal districts (distritos municipal): La Cuaba and La Guáyiga.

For comparison with other municipalities and municipal districts see the list of municipalities and municipal districts of the Dominican Republic.
