= Neiba =

Neiba Neyba
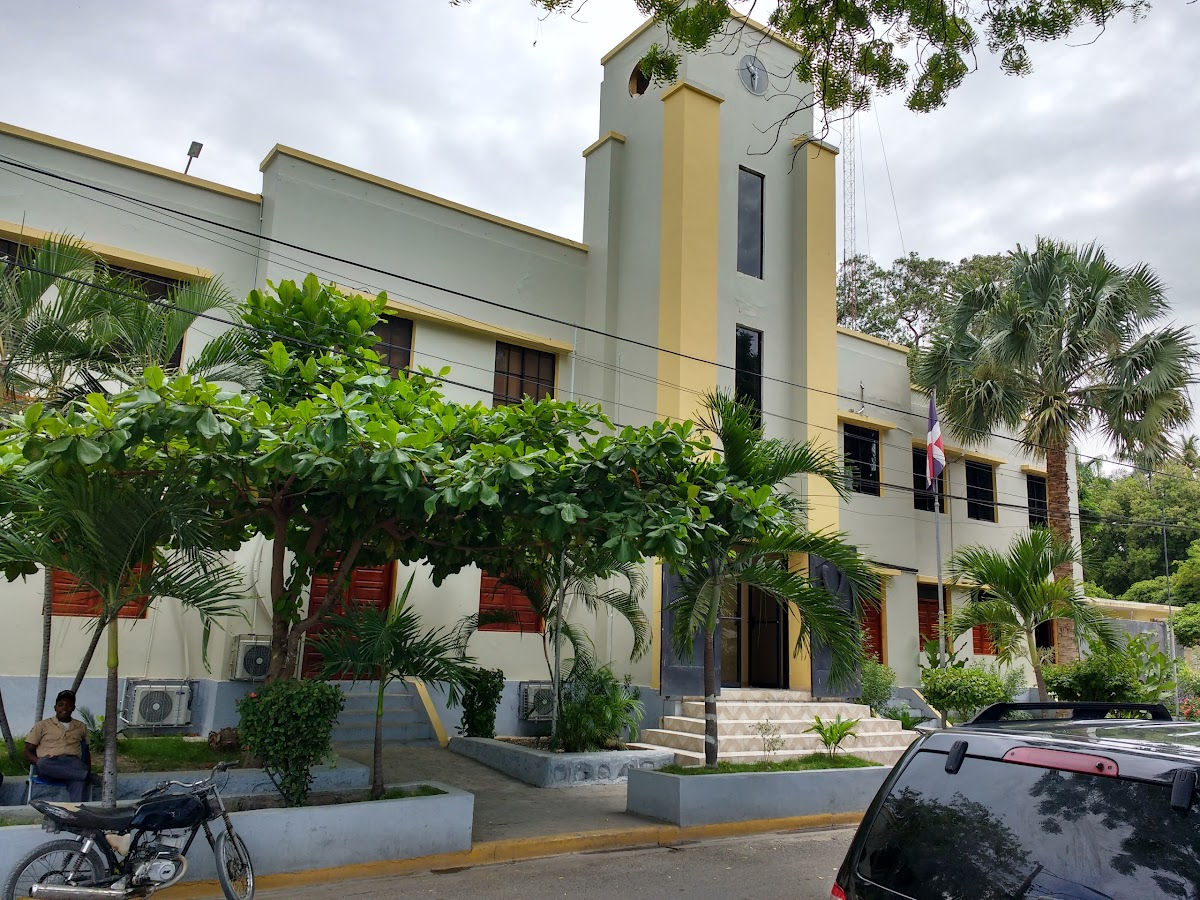
- Municipal building of Neiba

- Coat of arms

- Location in the Dominican Republic
- Coordinates: 18°29′24″N 71°25′12″W
- Country: Dominican Republic
- Province: Baoruco
- Founded: 1735
- Municipality: 1844

Area
  - Total: 275.33 km^{2} (106.31 sq mi)
- Elevation: 10 m (33 ft)

Population (2012)
  - Total: 53,605
  - Density: 194.69/km^{2} (504.25/sq mi)
  - Demonym: Neibero(a)
- Distance to: Santo Domingo: 230 km
- Municipal Districts: 1
- Climate: BSh

Neiba (also spelt Neyba) is a city in the southwest of the Dominican Republic. It is the capital city of the Baoruco province, and is located 180 kilometres west of the national capital, Santo Domingo, close to the shore of Lake Enriquillo, the largest lake in the West Indies.

== History ==
Before the conquest and colonization of Hispaniola, the place was a nitainato belonging to the Chiefdom of Jaragua.

Founded in 1546 as a town from a cattle herd on the west side, years later it was depopulated together with the Villa de San Juan, being refounded in 1735 when it was repopulated and its neighbors enjoyed their lands that were from the Azua district.

On March 13, 1844, a confrontation between Haitian and Dominican troops took place in the municipality in the so-called Battle of the Baptism of Blood, held in the now municipality of Galván, Bahoruco Province.

The municipality was also the scene of the restoration struggles, where the first war day began with the assault on the Neiba command, an action led by Cayetano Velásquez.

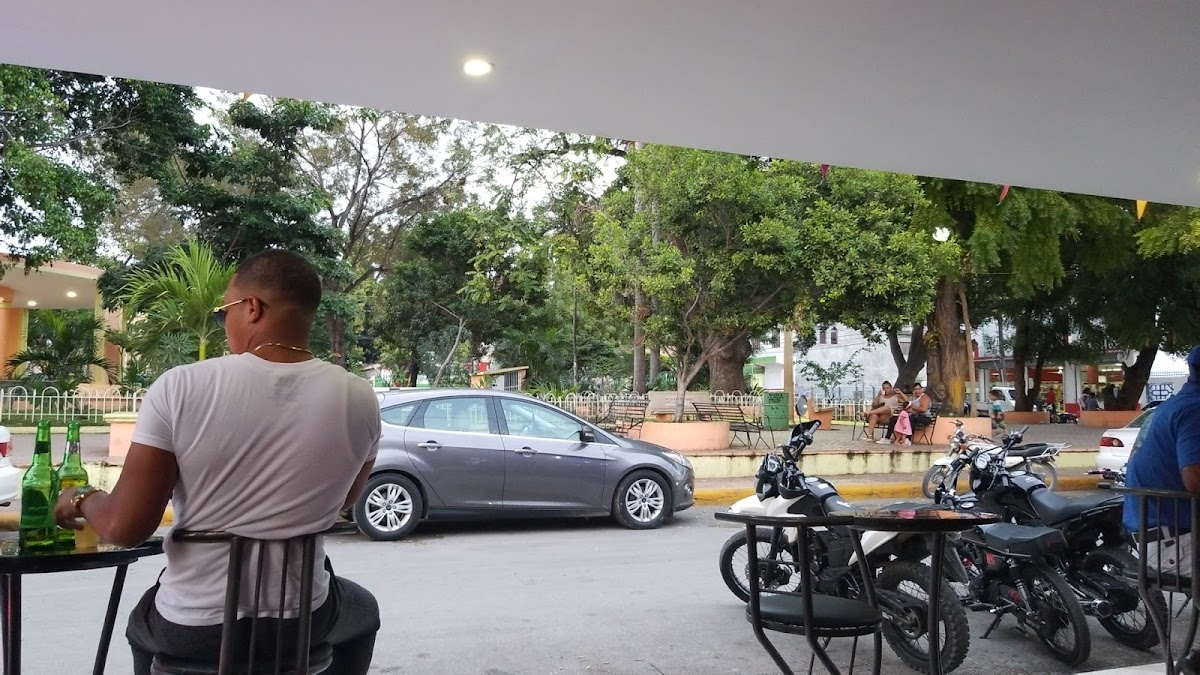
Neiba, Dominican Republic streets.

A Law of the National Congress of the year 1942, elevated Neiba to the category of head of the Province of Bahoruco, being inaugurated on March 18, 1943, during the era of Rafael Trujillo as President and dictator of the country. The date that is celebrated on March 10 by the inhabitants of the place, since it was on this date that the announcement was made.

== Economy ==
The most important crops in the municipality are: coffee and grapes. The municipality of Neiba was the first to export coffee to alternative markets in Europe, and for the industrialization of the grape, a factory was built for the production of wine, must, alcohol and jam, with the advice of the Government of Italy and Spain.

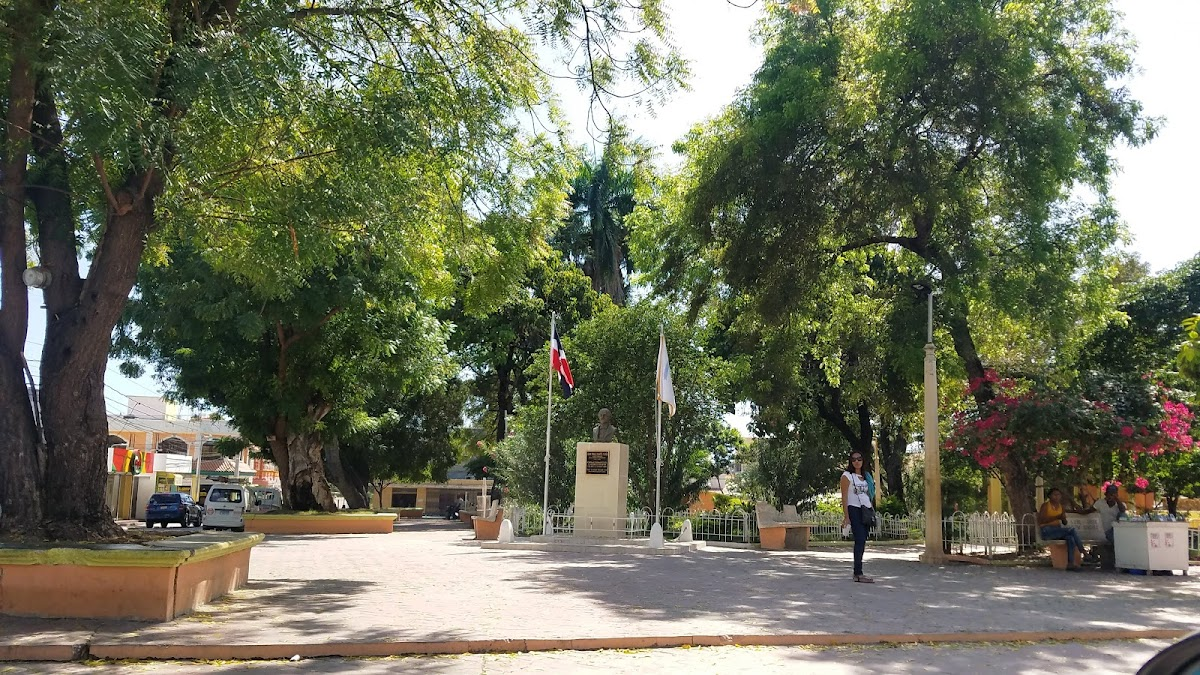
Neiba, Dominican Republic town park with Juan Pablo Duarte statue.

The grape reaches the American continent on the second voyage of Christopher Columbus. Being introduced in Neiba. The first coffee seedlings were introduced in 1735 from Saint Domingue.

The table grape: Red Globe or Red Globe, is the innovation of the moment, from the installation of the Grape Cluster.

Besides, bananas—mangoes, beans, passion fruit, honey, pigeon peas, okra are also grown to a lesser extent.

== Climate ==
Neiba has a hot semi-arid climate (Köppen: BSh)

Climate data for Neiba (1961-1990)
Month	Jan	Feb	Mar	Apr	May	Jun	Jul	Aug	Sep	Oct	Nov	Dec	Year
Record high °C (°F)	38.0 (100.4)	37.2 (99.0)	38.0 (100.4)	38.5 (101.3)	38.3 (100.9)	39.0 (102.2)	38.5 (101.3)	40.0 (104.0)	39.5 (103.1)	38.0 (100.4)	38.0 (100.4)	36.0 (96.8)	40.0 (104.0)
Mean daily maximum °C (°F)	31.7 (89.1)	32.1 (89.8)	33.2 (91.8)	33.8 (92.8)	33.6 (92.5)	33.6 (92.5)	34.5 (94.1)	34.6 (94.3)	34.3 (93.7)	33.8 (92.8)	32.8 (91.0)	31.8 (89.2)	33.3 (91.9)
Mean daily minimum °C (°F)	19.4 (66.9)	20.0 (68.0)	21.0 (69.8)	21.7 (71.1)	22.2 (72.0)	22.7 (72.9)	23.0 (73.4)	23.0 (73.4)	22.6 (72.7)	22.1 (71.8)	21.4 (70.5)	19.9 (67.8)	21.6 (70.9)
Record low °C (°F)	13.5 (56.3)	14.0 (57.2)	14.2 (57.6)	15.0 (59.0)	14.5 (58.1)	15.0 (59.0)	13.0 (55.4)	15.0 (59.0)	16.0 (60.8)	15.0 (59.0)	16.5 (61.7)	14.5 (58.1)	13.0 (55.4)
Average rainfall mm (inches)	8.1 (0.32)	13.7 (0.54)	19.3 (0.76)	36.3 (1.43)	109.7 (4.32)	48.6 (1.91)	30.3 (1.19)	61.6 (2.43)	61.9 (2.44)	74.3 (2.93)	39.1 (1.54)	17.3 (0.68)	520.2 (20.48)
Average rainy days (≥ 1.0 mm)	1.4	1.2	2.3	3.9	6.5	4.5	2.3	4.6	5.4	6.2	3.1	1.7	43.1
Source: NOAA

== Notable residents ==
- Miguel Montilla, (born 1952) professional boxer
