= La Romana Province =

Province of the Dominican Republic

La Romana
- Province
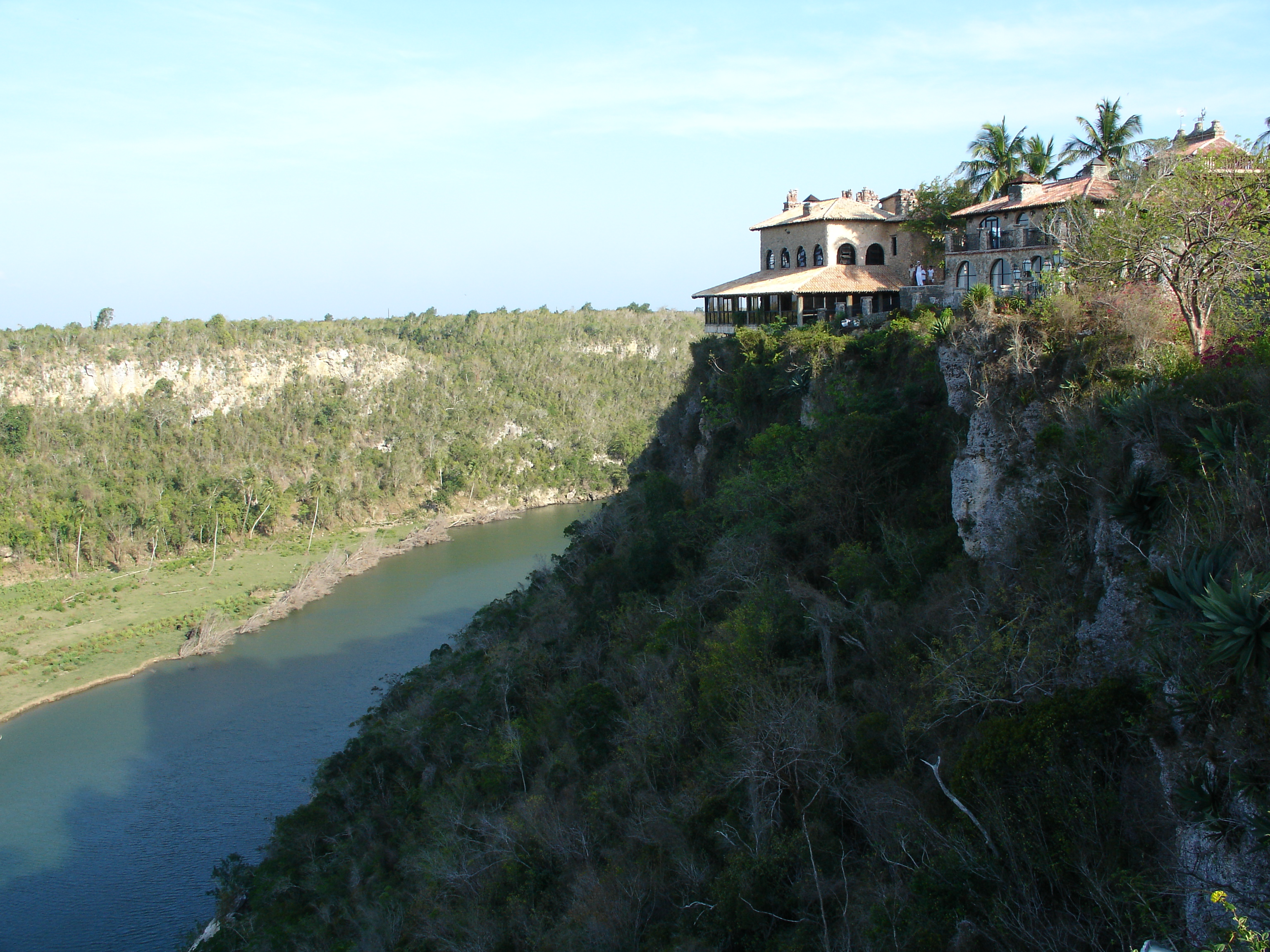
- La Romana, Dominican Republic landscape

- Location of the La Romana Province
- Country: Dominican Republic
- Province since: 1944
- Capital: La Romana

Government
  - Type: Subdivisions
  - Body: 3 municipalities 2 municipal districts
  - Congresspersons: 1 Senator; 4 Deputies

Area
  - Total: 653.95 km^{2} (252.49 sq mi)

Population (2014)
  - Total: 344,580
  - Density: 526.92/km^{2} (1,364.7/sq mi)
- Time zone: UTC-4 (EST)
- Area code: 1-809 1-829 1-849
- ISO 3166-2: DO-12
- Postal Code: 22000

La Romana (Spanish pronunciation: [la ɾoˈmana]) is a province of the Dominican Republic. The capital is also named La Romana, and is the third-largest city in the country. La Romana was elevated to the category of province in 1944. La Romana is also home to Casa de Campo, one of the world's largest resorts and top golfing destinations, including the Teeth of the Dog golf course. Many international and local artists perform at "Altos de Chavón", an artistic community and university.

La Romana is a port city ranked as Dominican Republic's seventh-largest by population (around 130,000, metro around 215,000). The city is located opposite Catalina Island, and approximately 80 kilometres (50 mi) from the national capital, Santo Domingo. Its name comes from a balance used to weigh merchandise for export. The province's patron saint is Rose of Lima.

== History ==
The province was created on January 1, 1961 after the older province of La Altagracia province was separated into two, whose capital was the city of La Romana, in the Province of La Romana and the new Province of La Altagracia. The political division of this province is one of the least complex in the country. It is made up of three municipalities: La Romana, Guaymate and Villa Hermosa (created as a municipality in 2004) and with the municipal districts of Caleta and Cumayasa. La Romana is the main municipality.

== Location ==
The province borders to the north with the province of El Seibo, to the east with the province of La Altagracia, to the south with the Caribbean Sea and to the west with the province of San Pedro de Macorís. The province is part of the eastern Yuma region. La Romana is the third smallest province in the country, with 653.95 square kilometres (252.49 sq mi) and occupies 1.3% of the national territory. The main rivers are Cumayasa, La Romana (or Río Dulce), and Chavón.

== Economy ==
La Romana's economy is based mainly on the sugar industry, free zones and tourism. In La Romana there are still what is called "bateyes", this is due to the great production of sugar cane. The bateyes are colonies of braceros, located in a suitable place for the handling of the agricultural work of the sugar cane. The main agricultural activity is the production of sugar cane followed by cattle raising, both milk and meat. In terms of industries, the main one is the production of sugar. In these places there are houses and facilities for agricultural activities. The sugar industry is the largest private employer in the country, with 25,000 workers including workers and office personnel.

Tourism is of the utmost importance with its beaches, hotels, restaurants, giftshop, and places of entertainment. Tourist attractions generate income for the province and many jobs for the people who live in La Romana. The Central Romana company is an Agro-Industrial, tourist company and works in free zones; it employs more than 25,000 people. 56% of the tourist infrastructures in the city of La Romana have been built by the private sector with the help of the Central Bank, generating more jobs and contributing to the development of the province. This infrastructure has performed the functions for which they have been created, serving as a means of transport and allowing them to travel to the desired destination in the case of constructions, they have been manufactured with high quality materials to guarantee the durability and safety of these works.

== Municipalities and municipal districts ==
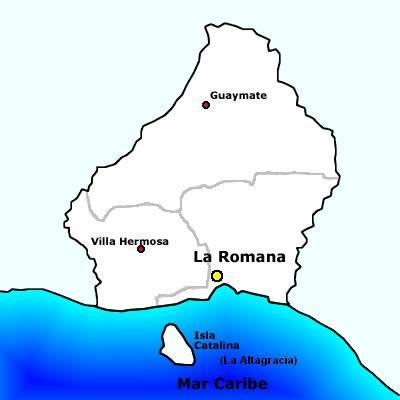
A map of the municipalities of the province of La Romana

The province as of June 20, 2006 is divided into the following municipalities (municipios) and municipal districts (distrito municipal - D.M.) within them:

- Guaymate
- La Romana
  - La Caleta (D.M.)
- Villa Hermosa
  - Cumayasa (D.M.)

The following is a sortable table of the municipalities with population figures as of an estimate on the 2012 census. Urban population are those living in the seats (cabeceras literally heads) of municipalities or of municipal districts. Rural population are those living in the districts (Secciones literally sections) and neighborhoods (Parajes literally places) outside of them. For comparison with the municipalities and municipal districts of other provinces see the list of municipalities and municipal districts of the Dominican Republic.

| Name | Total population | Urban population | Rural population |
|---|---|---|---|
| Guaymate | 28,233 | 7,089 | 21,144 |
| La Romana | 207,784 | 147,373 | 60,411 |
| Villa Hermosa | 108,563 | 70,675 | 17,888 |
| La Romana province | 344,580 | 125,137 | 119,443 |
