= Cotubanamá National Park =

National park in Dominican Republic

- Parque Nacional del Este
- IUCN category II (national park)
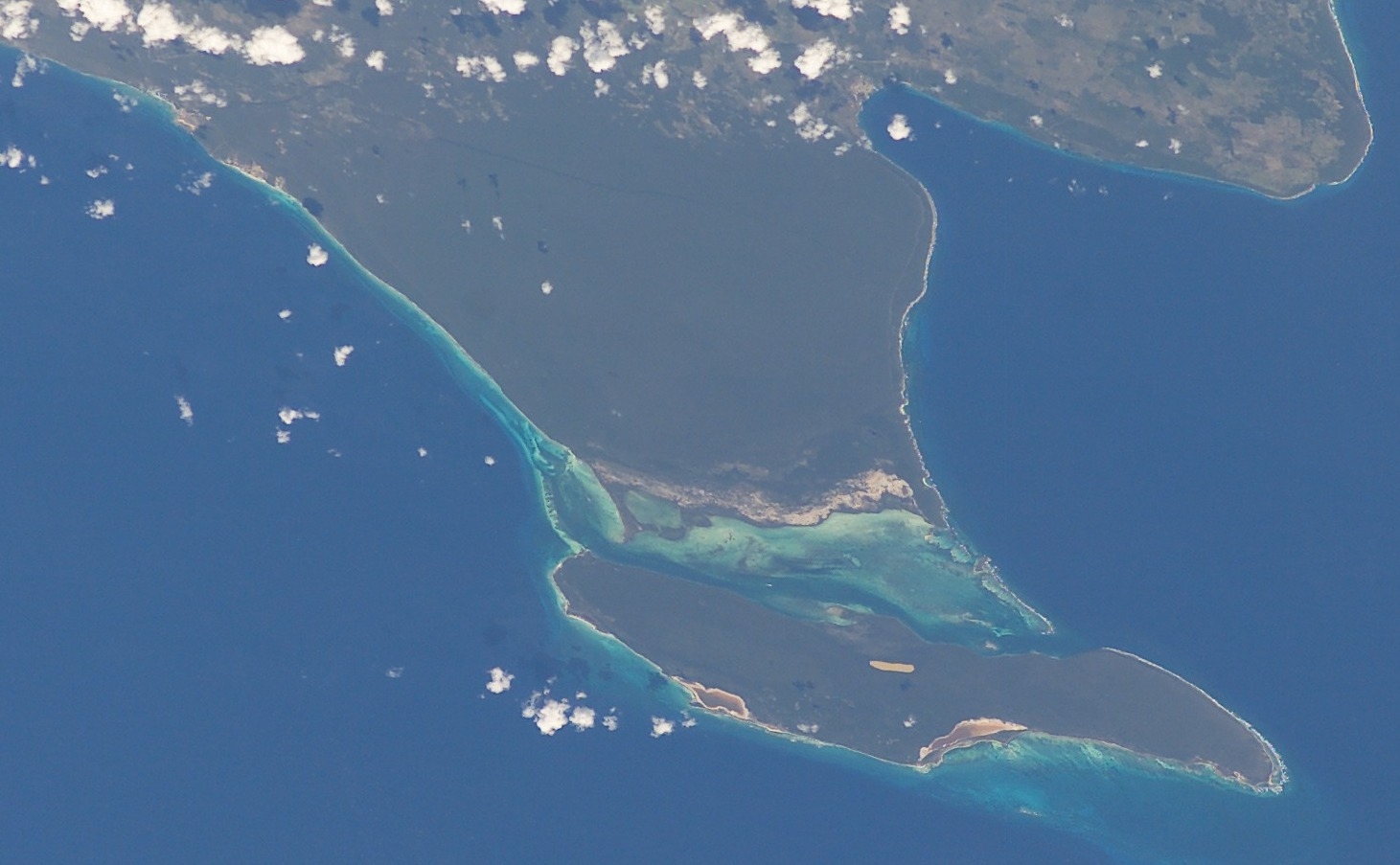
- Aerial picture of Cotubanamá National Park, displaying the Catuano Straight and Saona Island

- Location within the Dominican Republic
- Interactive map of Cotubanamá National Park
- Location: La Altagracia, Dominican Republic
- Nearest city: Bayahibe
- Coordinates: 18.279068°N 68.701663°W
- Area: 792 km^{2} (306 sq mi)
- Designation: National Park and Reserve
- Established: 1975

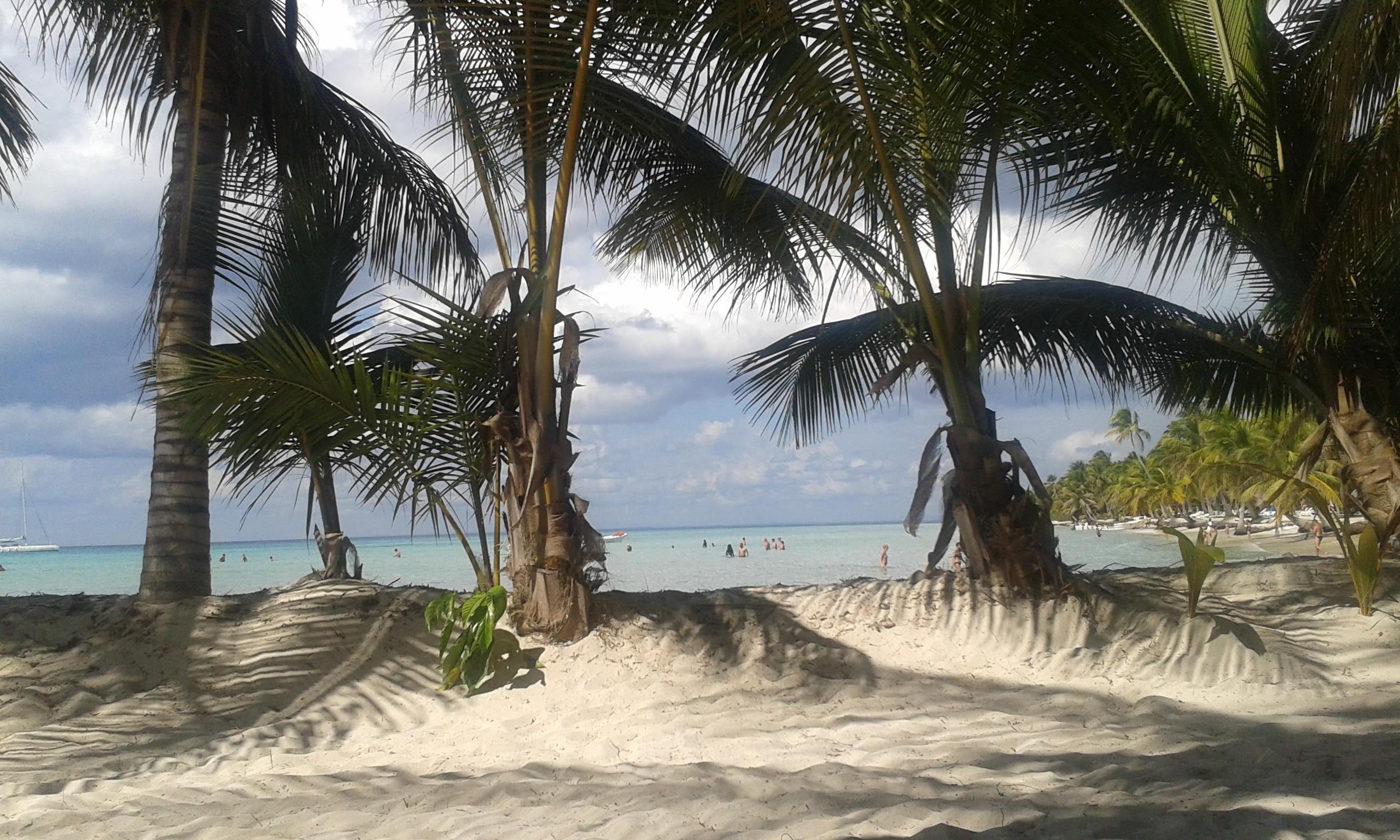
Isla Saona

Cotubanamá National Park (formerly Parque Nacional del Este or "National Park of the East") is located on the lower southeastern coast of the Dominican Republic, spanning across the provinces of La Altagracia and La Romana with an area of 791.9 km^{2} (305.8 sq mi) which includes a range of dense humid and dry subtropical forests, mangroves, beaches, and caves.

East National Park was officially declared a National Park and Reserve in 1975 by Decree No. 1311, and subsequently inducted into the environmental and Protected Area Laws No. 64-00 and Law No. 202-04, after a study was conducted on the land which discovered the presence of over 539 plant species, more than 50 of which are endemic to the region. It consists of 31,244 Ha of open space on the southeastern peninsula of Hispaniola and 10,650 Ha on Saona Island, a popular tourist destination, totaling 41,894 Ha in protected area. The protected area also includes a 12,000 Ha buffer zone around the park boundaries.

In 2014, the Dominican National Congress voted to change the park's original name of Parque Nacional del Este, to Parque Nacional Cotubanamá in honor of the fallen Taino Chief (Cacique).

== History ==
Before the arrival of explorer Christopher Columbus in 1492, the island of La Hispaniola was divided up into five Taino Chiefdoms: Marien, Magua, Jaragua, Maguana, and Higüey, each governed by a Head Chief or Cacique.

By 1502, the Spanish kingdom had already established the city of Santo Domingo, and had overtaken much of the southern and central regions with the help of Conquistador Juan de Esquivel, who had been successful in battle, but had overstepped by assassinating the Caciques of Saona Island and causing a rebellion spearheaded by Cotubanama.

Cotubanamá or Cotubano was the Cacique of the Higüey Chiefdom (where Cotubanamá National Park is currently located), described by Spanish Archbishop Bartolome de las Casas as being "... the most beautiful and resolved man that if set within a thousand men of any nation, I think would stand out... was of such a striking standing that any Spanish or anyone who saw him would admire him."

After several battles with heavy casualties on both sides, Cacique Cotubanamá and Captain Juan de Esquivel had made a truce to end further conflict; however, this truce would be short-lived. While in the absence of Juan de Esquivel and under the command of Martin de Villaman, Spanish soldiers had committed several atrocities and offenses against the Tainos that would reignite tensions, leading into an all-out war that would last eight to nine months.

Eventually, the Spanish dominated in battle and Cotubanamá along with his family fled to Saona Island for safety, where Cotubano was captured by a soldier named Juan López. The Chief was then taken to Santo Domingo and hanged on the orders of Governor Nicolás de Ovando in 1504.

== Geography ==
Cotubanamá National Park is described as having a 791.9 km^{2} (305.8 sq mi) trapezoidal shape, which occupies 109.55 km^{2} (42.30 sq mi) of La Romana Province and 305.06 km^{2} (117.78 sq mi) of the province of La Altagracia, uniting both sections of La Romana-Bayahibe and Boca de Yuma in the San Rafael del Yuma district.

The Park also includes the Islands of Isla Saona, which lie across the Catuano Strait on its southern coast with an area of 110 km^{2} (42 sq mi), and Isla Catalinita (Little Catalina) with only a total area of 22 ha (54 acres), located 3.5 km (2.2 mi) north of Saona Island.

Altogether, the National Park is one of the most protected reserves within the Caribbean Archipelago, made up of beaches, cliffs, humid and dry subtropical forest, 80% of which is seated upon a limestone and coral subsoil where underwater currents flow and connect with coastal waters, where thick mangrove vegetation creates a natural Aerial Root barrier.

Its flora consists of numerous plant and tree species, including Guayiga (Zamia), Bayahonda (Cambron), Caoba (mahogany), Beach Grape (Coccoloba uvifera), coconut palm, and Grigri (Bucida buceras) among many other species of cacti, shrubs, and over 500 distinct species of flowers.

=== Cave system ===
Cotubanamá National Park also contains historically important protected archaeological sites, including a system of more than 20 ceremonial plazas, over eight indigenous cemeteries, and hundreds of caves and sinkholes to date.

These caves were known to be sacred to the Taino population, used as places of ceremonies and rituals, most notably in the much-explored caverns of Jose Maria, Ramoncito, and Berna, where Tainos created thousands of pictographs, paintings, petroglyphs, and carvings.

Apart from rituals and ceremonies, Tainos used underwater caverns as a source of fresh drinking water, which also served for cooking and day-to-day necessities, as in the case of the Padre Nuestro (Our Father) Complex, which houses the Cueva de Chicho, Cueva El Toro, and Cueva Brujo Caverns with freshwater pools.

Just 20 km (12 mi) from the Padre Nuestro Complex, the natural water spring Manantial de la Aleta ('Spring of the Fin') was also a source of drinkable water for the Taino population, and may have been a ceremonial site, as large quantities of intact ceramics, potiza bottles, and tools have been found there.

== Wildlife ==
Among land animals in Cotubanamá National Park, the rhinoceros iguana, hutia (Plagiodontia aedium), and solenodon (Solenodon paradoxus) are the most prominent and endemic to the region, the solenodon being the oldest native species that can be traced back millions of years.

The coastal biological marine life includes thriving coral reefs, sea mammals such as manatees and dolphins, accompanied by Caribbean reef squids, southern stingrays, porcupine or pufferfish, and spotted moray eels.

There are over 300 species of bird life located within the park's boundaries, most notably the Hispaniolan parrot, black-crowned palm tanager, ashy-faced owl, Hispaniolan woodpeckers, pelicans, and Antillean piculet.

== Tourism ==
According to the Dominican Ministry of Tourism, Cotubanamá National Park is the most visited of all parks and reserves in the Dominican Republic, attracting 45% of all visitors that travel to protected reserves in 2019, totaling 728,000 people, of which 97% were foreigners.

Due to the COVID-19 outbreak, the park was closed off to foreign visitors and locals.

In 2021, the park was re-opened to visitors, only attracting 30,000 tourists from the month of April to June. Along with Los Tres Ojos Caves in Santo Domingo, both areas brought in more visitors than any other natural reserve in the Caribbean according to Statista.

== The Cartagena Convention and SPAW ==
Since November 24, 1998, the Dominican Republic has formed part of the Cartagena Convention, the only regional environmental pact that focuses on the protection of key coastal ecosystems from human terrestrial activities or contamination, by cooperating with regional partners to promote a sustainable development.

As of 2021, Cotubanamá National Park, along with the Jaragua-Bahoruco-Enriquillo Biosphere Reserve, La Caleta Underwater National Park, and Los Haitises National Park, have been admitted into the Specially Protected Areas and Wildlife (SPAW) as announced by the Dominican Ministry of Environmental and Natural Resources, drawing international attention to the region.

The SPAW protocol has allowed member countries to exchange their experiences and ideas on how to improve sustainability on Caribbean coasts, working to preserve coral reefs and endangered species.
