= Higüey =

- Salvaleón de Higüey
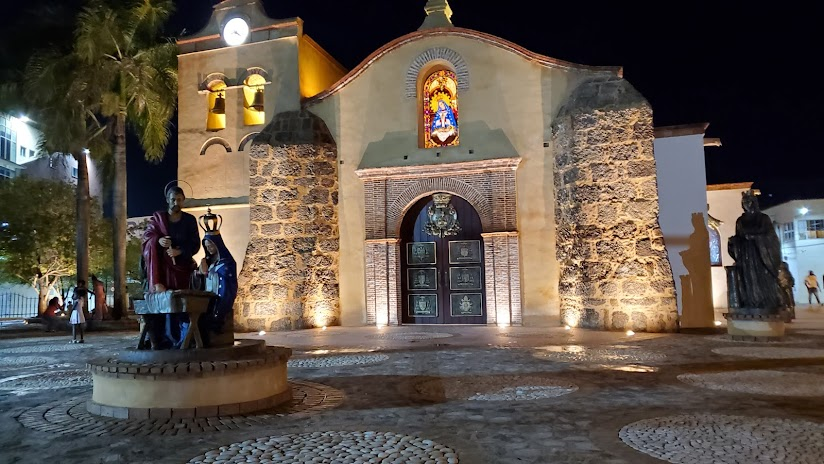
- First cathedral of Higüey

- Coat of arms

- Location within the Dominican Republic
- Coordinates: 18°37′12″N 68°42′36″W
- Country: Dominican Republic
- Province: La Altagracia
- Founded: 1503
- Municipality since: 1844

Area
  - Total: 2,029.14 km^{2} (783.46 sq mi)
- Elevation: 106 m (348 ft)

Population (2022)
  - Total: 115,084
  - Density: 56.7157/km^{2} (146.893/sq mi)
  - Demonym: Higüeyano(a)
- Municipal Districts: 3
- Classification: Af

Higüey (Spanish pronunciation: [iˈɣwej]), or in full Salvaleón de Higüey, is the capital city of the eastern La Altagracia Province, in the Dominican Republic, and has 415,084 inhabitants, according to the 2022 census. The Yuma River flows through the urban areas of Higüey.

Higüey is also the name of a former native chiefdom in Hispaniola's easternmost end when Christopher Columbus arrived. It is now one of the country's economically fastest-developing cities, sometimes nicknamed the Capital of Dominican Tourism or the Capital of Stockbreeding. As of 2006, over 150,000 people lived in Higüey. The city thrives chiefly on tourism, with many of its inhabitants employed in the hotel complexes of Punta Cana a few kilometers away, or selling tourist products.

The most important monuments in the city are the Basilica of La Altagracia and the Church of San Dionisio (Saint Denis), from the 16th century. The current mayor of the city is Karina Aristy.

== Toponomy ==
According to some authors, the name 'Guey' or 'Huiou' is the sun in the Arawakan language of the island's native Taíno people.

== Economy ==
The economy of Higüey is based on tropical agriculture (reed, coffee, tobacco, cacao, rice, and maize), livestock (cattle and pigs), fishing and tourism on the coast.

== Tourism ==
The main historical attraction in Higüey is the cathedral, which displays the "Virgen de la Altagracia", a painting brought by Spanish missionaries in the 15th century. The painting was previously kept in the similarly 500-year-old church of San Dionisio, which remains in religious use. Every year on Virgin of La Altagracia Day, which is a national holiday on January 21, tens of thousands of pilgrims visit the cathedral.

== History ==
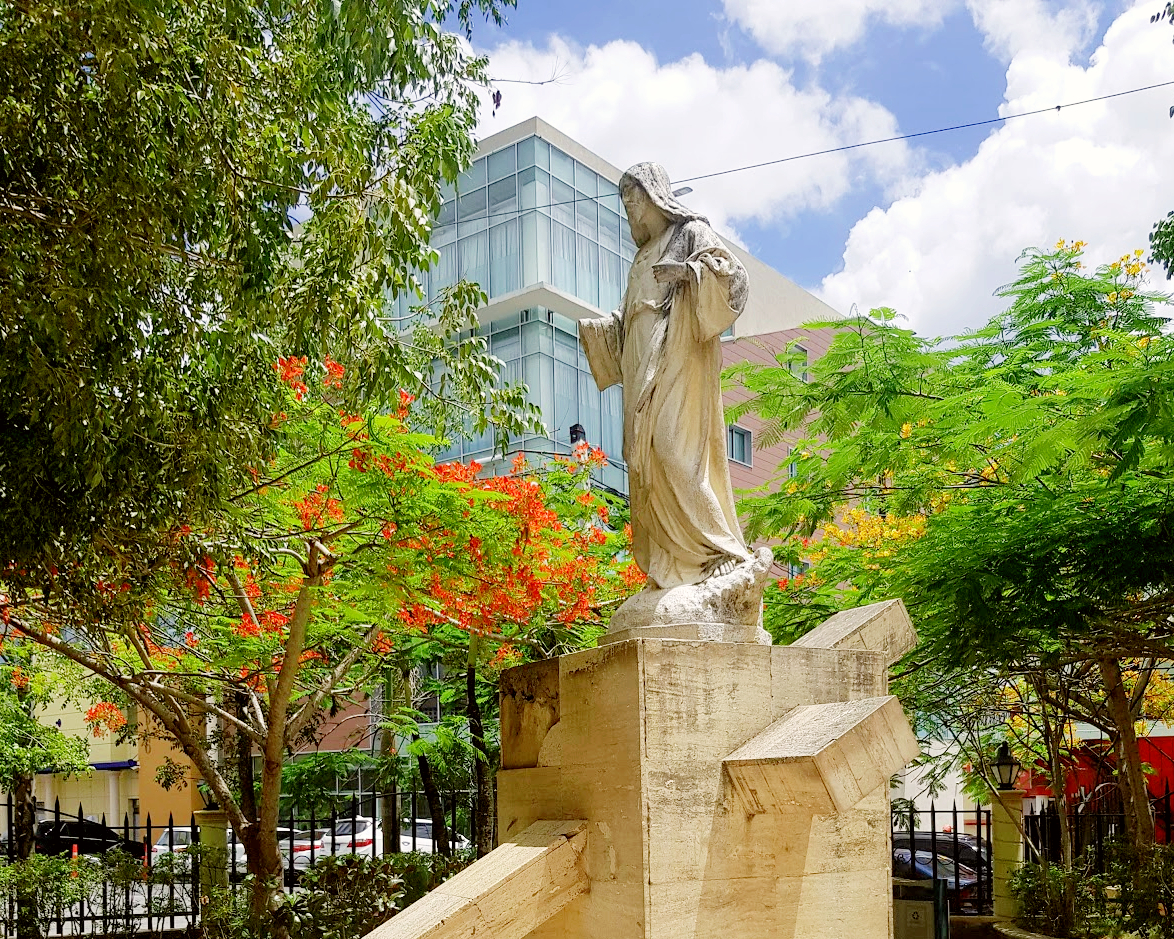
Statue in Higuey, Dominican Republic.

When European settlers invaded Hispaniola, this eastern section belonged to the Caíçimu-Higüey kingdom of Taíno Indians. Leaders included Caciques Cotubanamá and Cayacoa, the female Cacique Higuanamá and other leaders, male and female. This area became the last to be conquered by the Spanish. Juan de Esquivel led the conquest in 1503, a year after the brutal Nicolás de Ovando was appointed the new colony's governor. He assigned Esquivel to subjugate the area, justifying the assignment as payback for a Taino attack (led by Cotubanamá) on 8 Spanish sailors, which was in turn revenge for Spaniards who slaughtered the Cacique of nearby Saona for sport, setting a battle Mastiff to attack him as he was loading traded cassava bread on a barge.

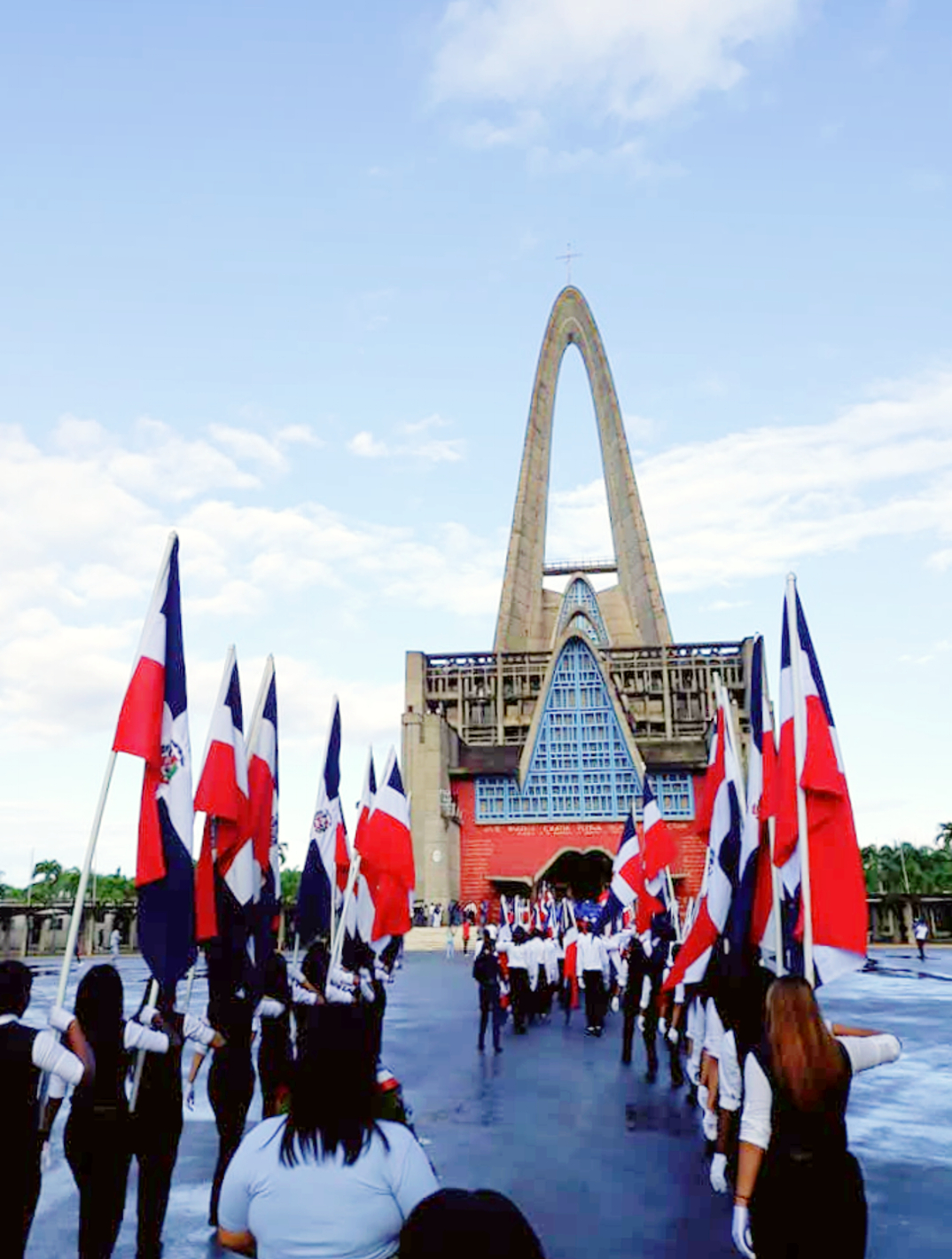
Higuey, Dominican Republic flags.

The First War of Higüey was encouraged by Higuanamá in 1502 and the Second War of Higüey was encouraged by Cotubanamá in 1504. Bartolomé de las Casas participated in and later described the Higüey massacre in which the Spanish slaughtered natives who surrendered after a short but heroic resistance. Men, women, and children were disemboweled alive; many were tortured by having hands and feet cut off as the Spaniards taunted, while others were hanged or knifed to death. Reports of this outraged the people back in Spain, with the royal court and its officials trying to regulate the behaviour of colonists. To do this, they issued the Laws of Burgos of 1512. However, the law arrived late and by 1519 the Taíno of the Higüey region were already for the most part enslaved, and their numbers had declined to only 1,189 individuals. The Spanish then brought in African slaves to replace the natives. Nevertheless, the Laws of Burgos would help mitigate such behaviour in the territories yet to be conquered.

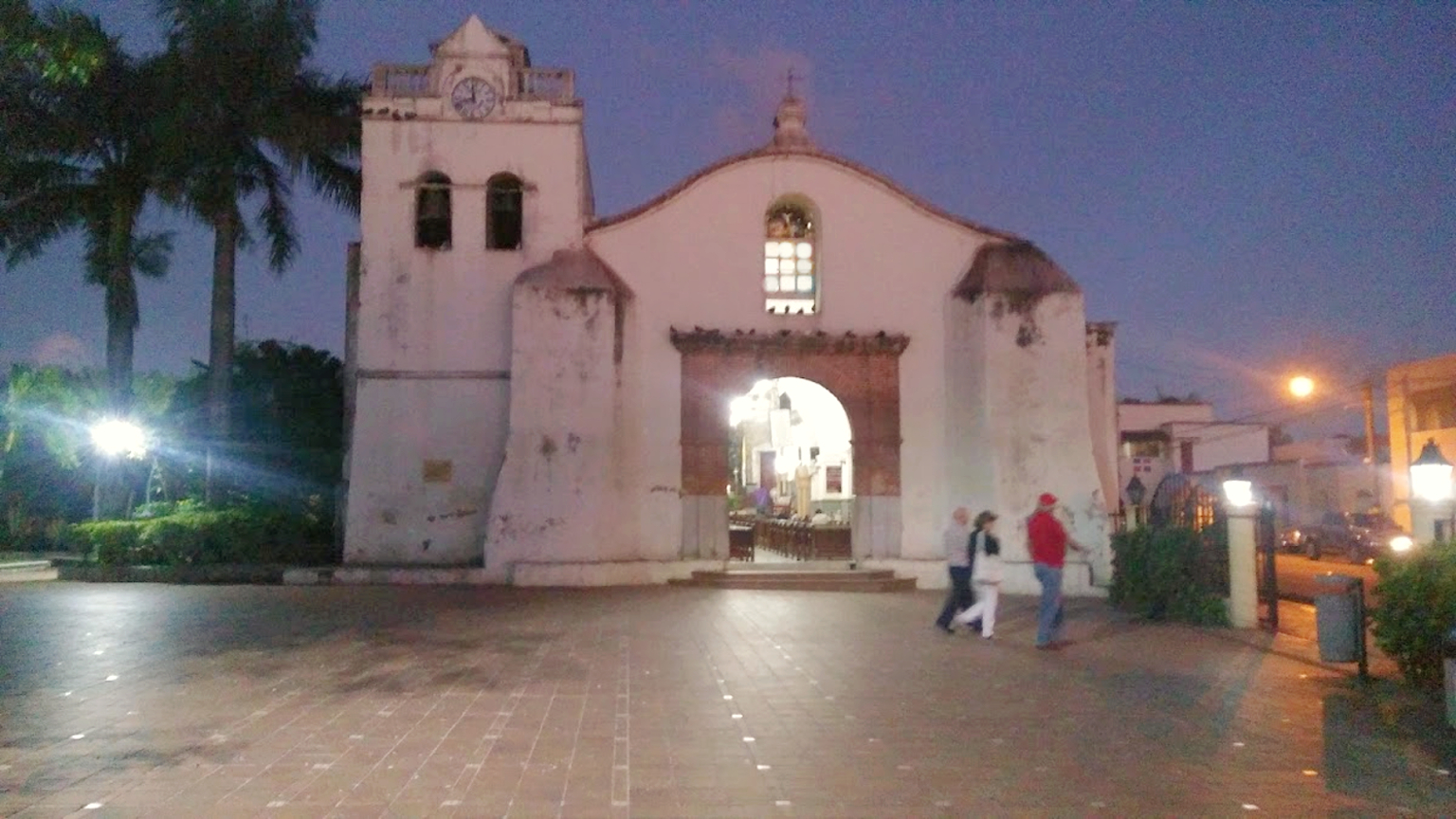
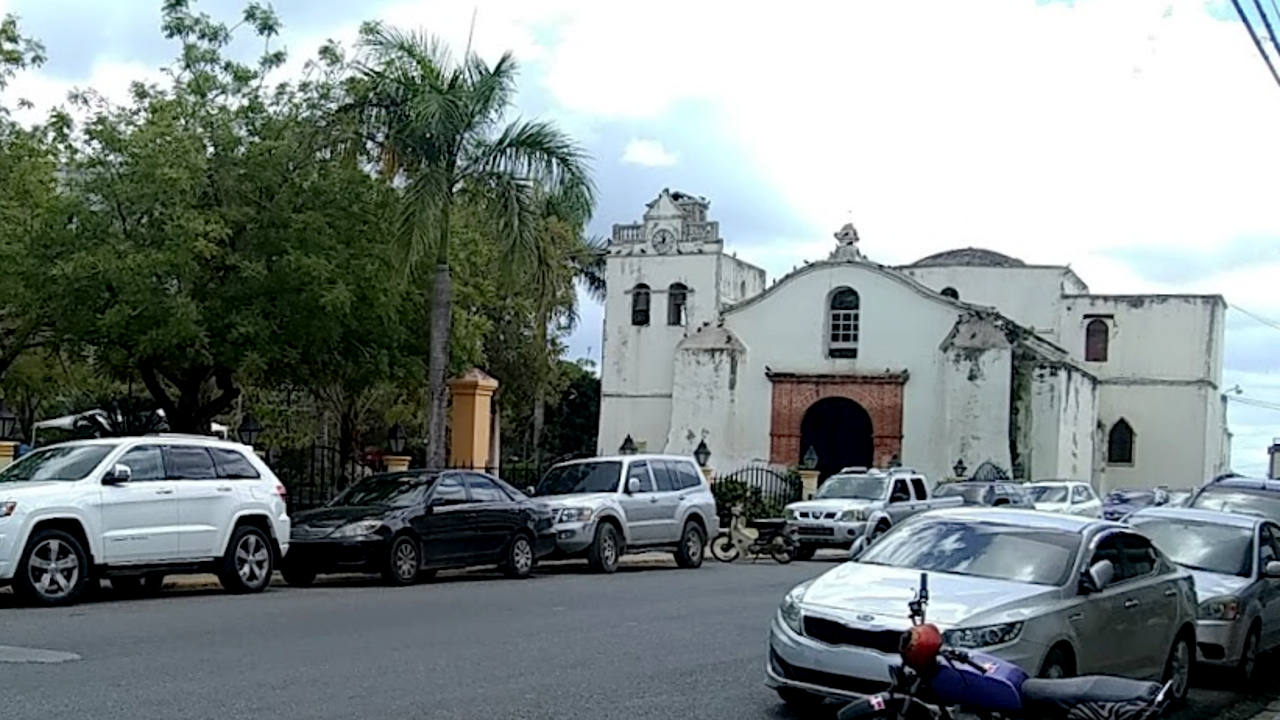
First cathedral of Higuey, Dominican Republic constructed in the 1500s.

On December 7, 1508, Spanish trade authorities at Seville authorized Higüey to display a Coat of Arms by Royal Privilege, which granted it limited self-government. During the Spanish colonial period, Higüey remained a Parish of El Seibo county.

Then in 1801, a decade after the Haitian Revolution began, and after Napoleon deposed the Spanish king, Toussaint Louverture briefly captured the Spanish portion of Hispaniola. Spain had ceded Hispaniola to France under the Treaty of Basel in 1795, and did not regain control until 1809. During this and French rule, Higüey was a district of the Ozama department. After Spanish forces regained control in the España Boba period, Higüey again became part of the El Seibo región. In 1821, during the brief Republic of Spanish Haiti, the area tried to protect itself from its much larger neighbors by allying with Gran Colombia. However, wars both with Haiti and for independence continued. In 1822, Haitian forces under the command of Jean-Pierre Boyer captured Higüey as part of the Haitian occupation of Santo Domingo. The local economy sputtered under military rule and land expropriations.

When the Dominican Republic was proclaimed in 1844 through the efforts of La Trinitaria, the new Governmental Central Meeting placed Higüey under administration of the province of El Seibo. Pedro Santana, although President sporadically during the next decades, actually acted as the country's first dictator. While he ranched near the Haitian border, this eastern province was one of his strongholds. Santana sought to return to Spanish rule, and he got his wish for the four years before his death (although Spanish rule did little to develop the province). After the War of Restoration, the second Republic, either because of or in spite of the Monroe Doctrine lasted until 1916, although the countryside remained extremely poor and actually governed by various aristocratic cliques. Guerillas from El Seibo province fought the United States occupation of Santo Domingo from 1916 to 1924. The area experienced a few years of relative prosperity before agricultural prices again crashed and further de facto dictatorships began under Rafael Leónidas Trujillo Molina. The United States again occupied Santo Domingo from 1965 to 1966.

== Sectors ==
The city is divided into more than 50 sectors, some of them are:

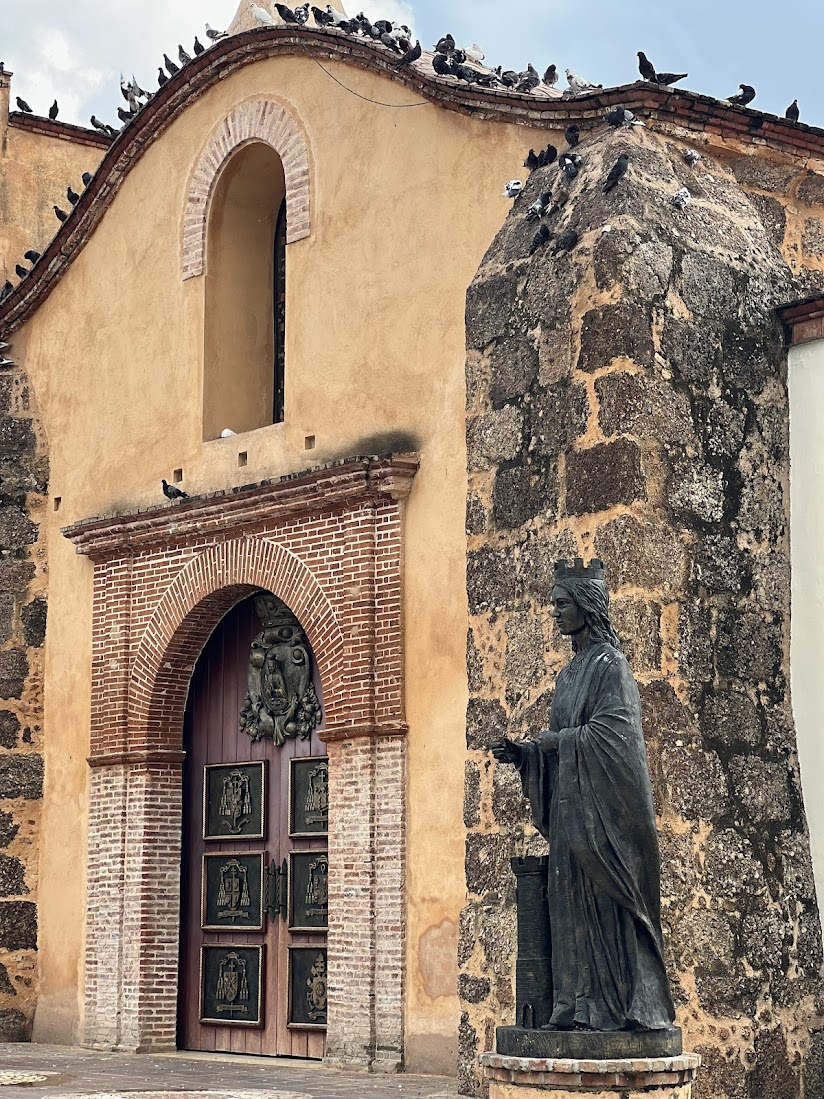
First cathedral of Higuey, Dominican Republic.

Higuey, Dominican Republic.

- Alta Torre
- Antonio Guzmán
- Baja Torre
- Bávaro
- Cambelén
- Enriquillo
- Juan Pablo Duarte
- La Florida
- La Malena
- La Otra Banda
- Lagunas de Nisibón
- Los Guaricanos
- Los Platanitos
- Los Sotos
- Macao
- Mamá Tingó
- Naciado Mejía
- Pepe Rosario
- Sajour
- San Francisco
- San José
- San Martín
- Savica
- Los Rosales
- Verón-Punta Cana
- Villa Cerro
- Villa Higüey
- Villa Nazaret

== Climate ==
Higüey features a trade-wind tropical rainforest climate, with consistently high temperatures and substantial rainfall throughout the year. The city has drier periods, with January to March being the driest months, but like other cities and towns with this climate, there is no dry season, and the city experiences an average of more than 55 inches or 1,400 millimetres of rainfall a year.

Climate data for Higüey, Dominican Republic (1961-1990)
Month	Jan	Feb	Mar	Apr	May	Jun	Jul	Aug	Sep	Oct	Nov	Dec	Year
Record high °C (°F)	35.0 (95.0)	36.0 (96.8)	37.0 (98.6)	36.0 (96.8)	37.0 (98.6)	37.4 (99.3)	37.0 (98.6)	38.0 (100.4)	38.4 (101.1)	38.0 (100.4)	39.0 (102.2)	33.0 (91.4)	39.0 (102.2)
Mean daily maximum °C (°F)	29.1 (84.4)	29.3 (84.7)	30.2 (86.4)	30.7 (87.3)	31.2 (88.2)	32.2 (90.0)	32.4 (90.3)	32.4 (90.3)	32.5 (90.5)	32.0 (89.6)	30.7 (87.3)	29.1 (84.4)	31.0 (87.8)
Mean daily minimum °C (°F)	20.0 (68.0)	19.9 (67.8)	20.3 (68.5)	21.1 (70.0)	22.1 (71.8)	23.0 (73.4)	23.3 (73.9)	23.3 (73.9)	23.0 (73.4)	22.4 (72.3)	21.6 (70.9)	20.7 (69.3)	21.7 (71.1)
Record low °C (°F)	13.0 (55.4)	14.5 (58.1)	15.0 (59.0)	16.1 (61.0)	17.3 (63.1)	19.0 (66.2)	19.0 (66.2)	19.1 (66.4)	19.1 (66.4)	19.1 (66.4)	16.2 (61.2)	16.8 (62.2)	13.0 (55.4)
Average rainfall mm (inches)	75.6 (2.98)	66.8 (2.63)	71.6 (2.82)	105.3 (4.15)	183.1 (7.21)	101.3 (3.99)	117.9 (4.64)	141.2 (5.56)	134.4 (5.29)	160.0 (6.30)	152.1 (5.99)	113.9 (4.48)	1,423.2 (56.04)
Average rainy days (≥ 1.0 mm)	10.1	7.6	7.1	8.0	11.4	8.8	11.0	12.1	10.3	12.2	12.5	12.9	124
Source: NOAA

== Basilica of La Altagracia ==
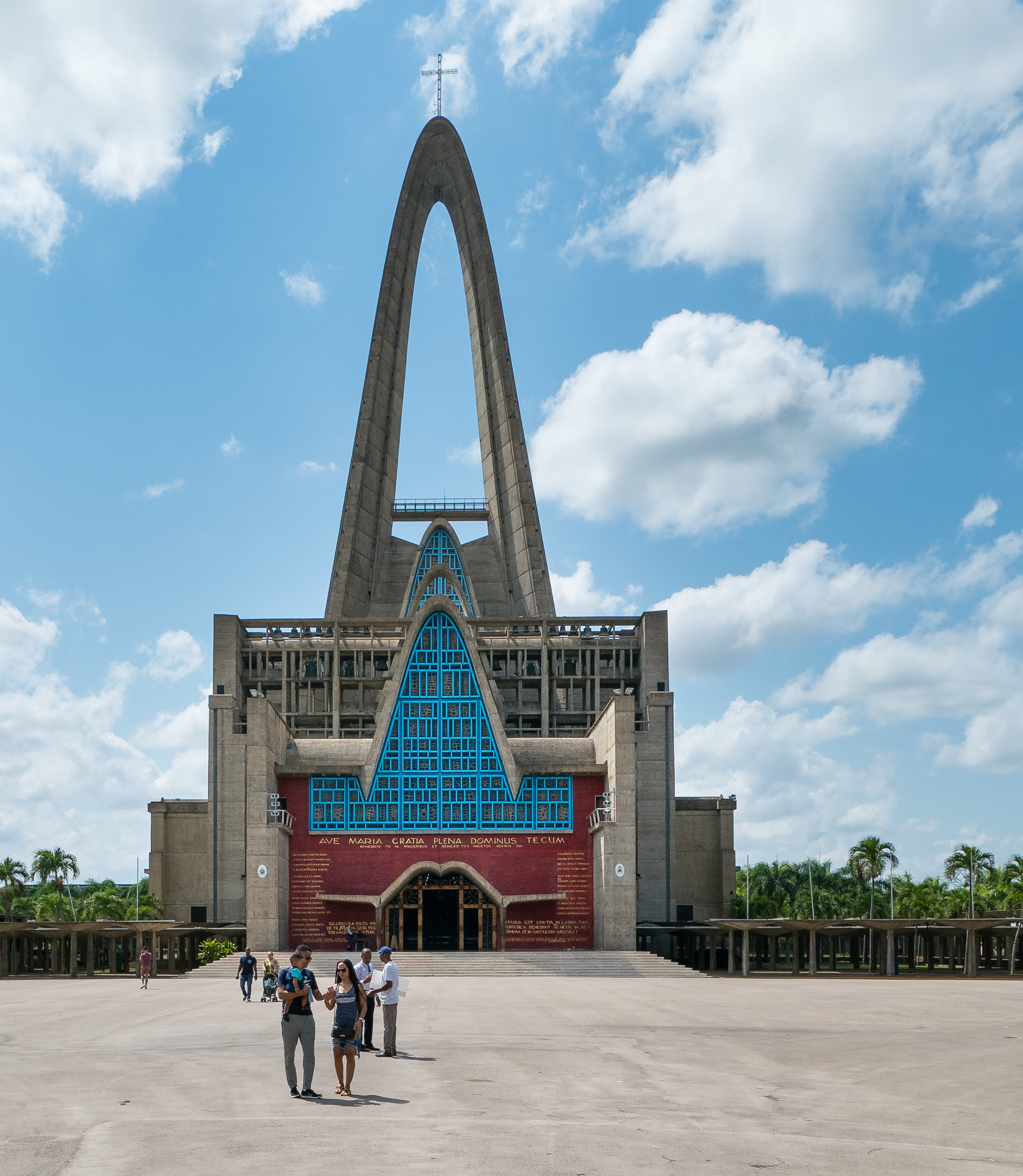
Basilica de La Altagracia

The town's patroness is the Virgin of La Altagracia, a painting brought to the island by Spanish missionaries and now displayed in the Sanctuary of Our Lady of La Altagracia. Every year on her feast day (January 21), thousands of Dominicans gather to venerate the miraculous image at what might be the earliest Marian shrine in the Americas. The Spanish National Library in Madrid has a letter from Can. Lic. Luis Jerónimo of Alcocer, born on Hispaniola, mentioning the veneration as early as 1650. The current Basilica was built to honor the image, which remains displayed in the old Cathedral's Sanctuary, which a corridor now unites to a modern basilica suitable for such large gatherings.

== The Sanctuary of Higüey ==
Juan de Esquivel, conqueror of the local Taino and later Jamaica, founded the historic village of Salvaleón of Higüey in 1505, and included a parish church. The first Marian sanctuary in America was emblazoned with a royal shield by order of the King of Spain.

The current brick cathedral was started in the middle of the 16th century by Can. Mr. Alonso of Rock with the architectural assistance of Simón Bolívar, fifth grandfather of the Liberator of South America. Despite the region's earthquakes, the solid construction has resisted deterioration. It has a vaulted ceiling of five simple but sturdy arches. While the dome they support resembles an orange skin or star, a seashell shape emphasized the altar area. At the center of the high altar, a silver niche highlights the ancient holy painting. The 16th-century artist carved the local mahogany by hand. An ornate silver baldaquin covers the high altar, steps and Sacrarium.

The old cathedral has a simple exterior, as does the bell tower. Joaquín Alfáu donated the bells in 1864, and a dozen years later paid for marble to pave the floor.

The Sanctuary keeps many votive offerings. Some are of historic value, others are curiosities or reminders of the gold and silver fever that once infected the region. In 1922, to celebrate independence as well as the painting's Canonical and Papal Coronation on August 15, residents donated a beautiful crown of gold and precious stones, topped by a cross of diamonds and two solid gold angels. The painting itself has a gold and silver frame, inlaid by precious stones including an emerald donated by Pope Pius X to Archbishop Adolfo Alejandro Nouel to commemorate his election as President of the Republic in 1912 (shortly before the first American occupation ended his term and he donated it to the miraculous image). The cathedral's treasury also holds a gigantic intricate colonial golden monstrance, as well as an elegant silver throne (with golden inlays and chimes), which was used in 1811 during the painting's transfer from the Church of San Dionisio. Another silver chalice dates from 1737, gift of the President of the Royal Audience of Saint. Other precious objects include gold and silver walking canes, as well as many precious antique silver items including a crucifix, two chalices and cups, six sticks for the canopy used on feast days and other special occasions, a cross and parochial candlesticks, candelabras and flower vases.

== Airport ==
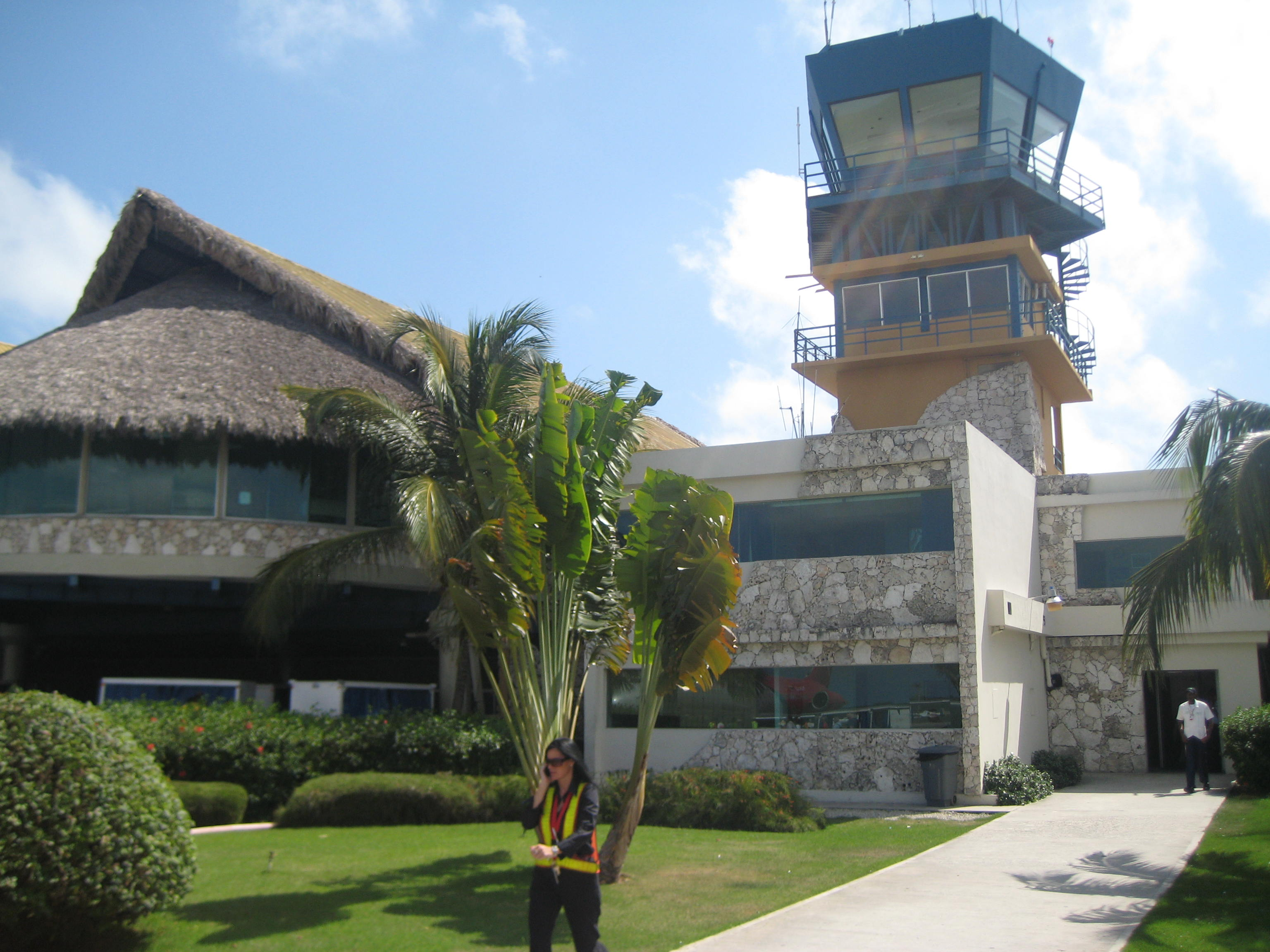
Punta Cana, Dominican Republic airport terminal.

Punta Cana International Airport (IATA: PUJ, ICAO: MDPC) is a privately owned commercial airport in Punta Cana, eastern Dominican Republic. The airport is built in a traditional Dominican style with open-air terminals with their roofs covered in palm fronds. A number of scheduled and charter airlines fly to Punta Cana. The airport handled more than 1 million visitors in 2002, making it the busiest airport in the Dominican Republic. In 2007 Punta Cana received more than 3 million passengers. The operators plan to upgrade the airport, including adding another runway.

== Tourist sites ==
- Bávaro
- Punta Cana
- Bayahíbe
- Boca de Yuma
- El Parque Nacional del Este
- Basílica de Nuestra Señora de La Altagracia

== See also ==
- Chiefdoms of Hispaniola
- Juan Ponce de León
