= Boca de Yuma =

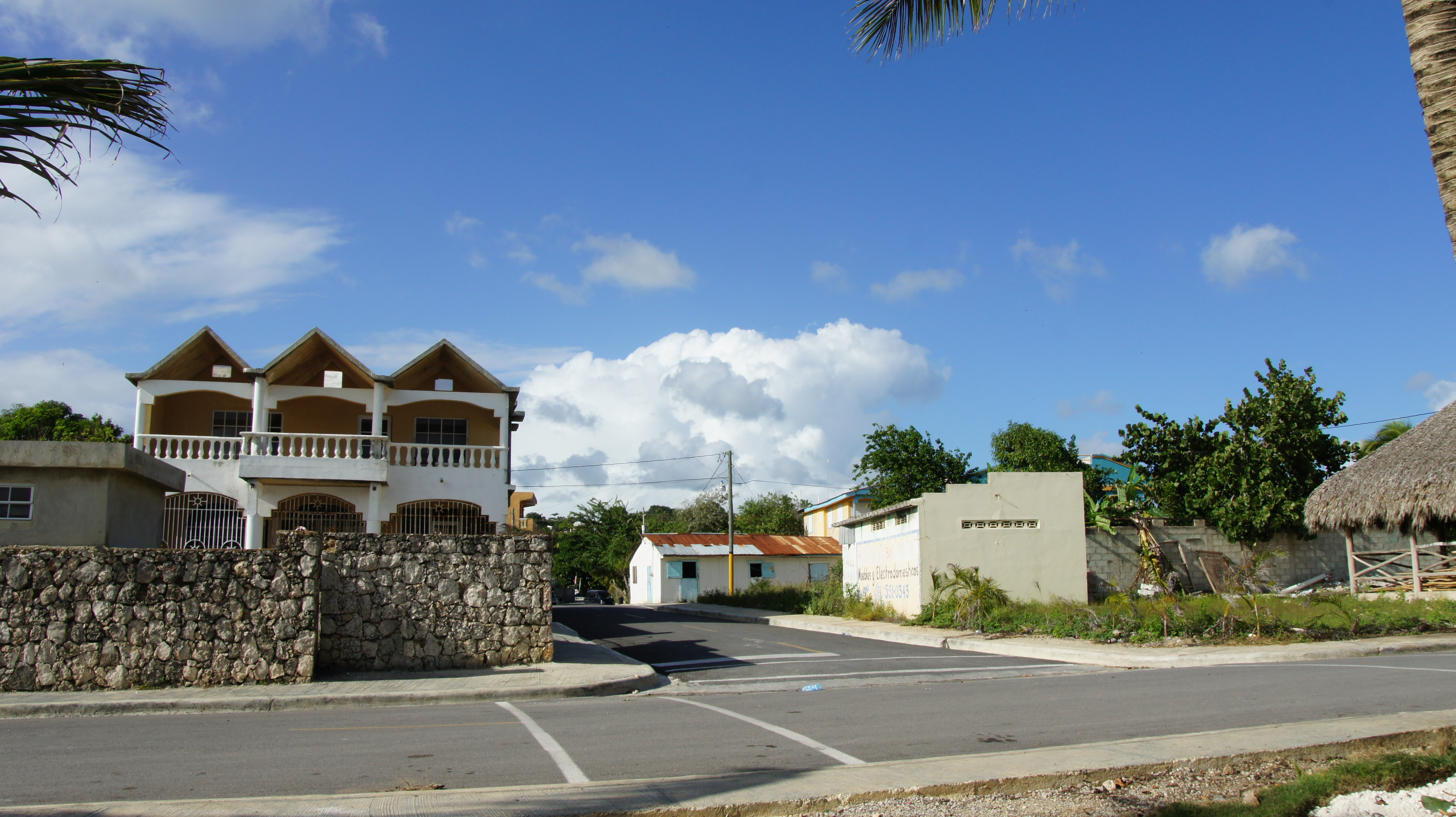
- Streets of Boca de Yuma

- Location within the Dominican Republic
- Coordinates: 18°22′48″N 68°36′0″W
- Country: Dominican Republic
- Province: La Altagracia

Population (2008)
  - Total: 2,342

Boca de Yuma is a town of La Altagracia province in the eastern region of Dominican Republic. It is situated west of the mouth of the Yuma River, near the Caribbean Sea. The word Yuma is taken from the region's indigenous language, Taíno.

The village is a few miles west of the Del Este National Park, one of the largest national parks in the country, with an area of 310 square kilometers.

== History ==
=== The Beginning of Boca de Yuma ===
The first families that settled the village of Boca de Yuma came from various regions of the Spanish colonial Captaincy General of Santo Domingo on Hispaniola. Perhaps one of the first persons to settle here was Pedro Sifuentes, nicknamed the Portugalete. He has also been referred to as the Dominican 'Robinson Crusoe' due to the many years of living alone here after the sinking of his ship in the adjacent Yuma Bay.

=== Forts and pirates ===
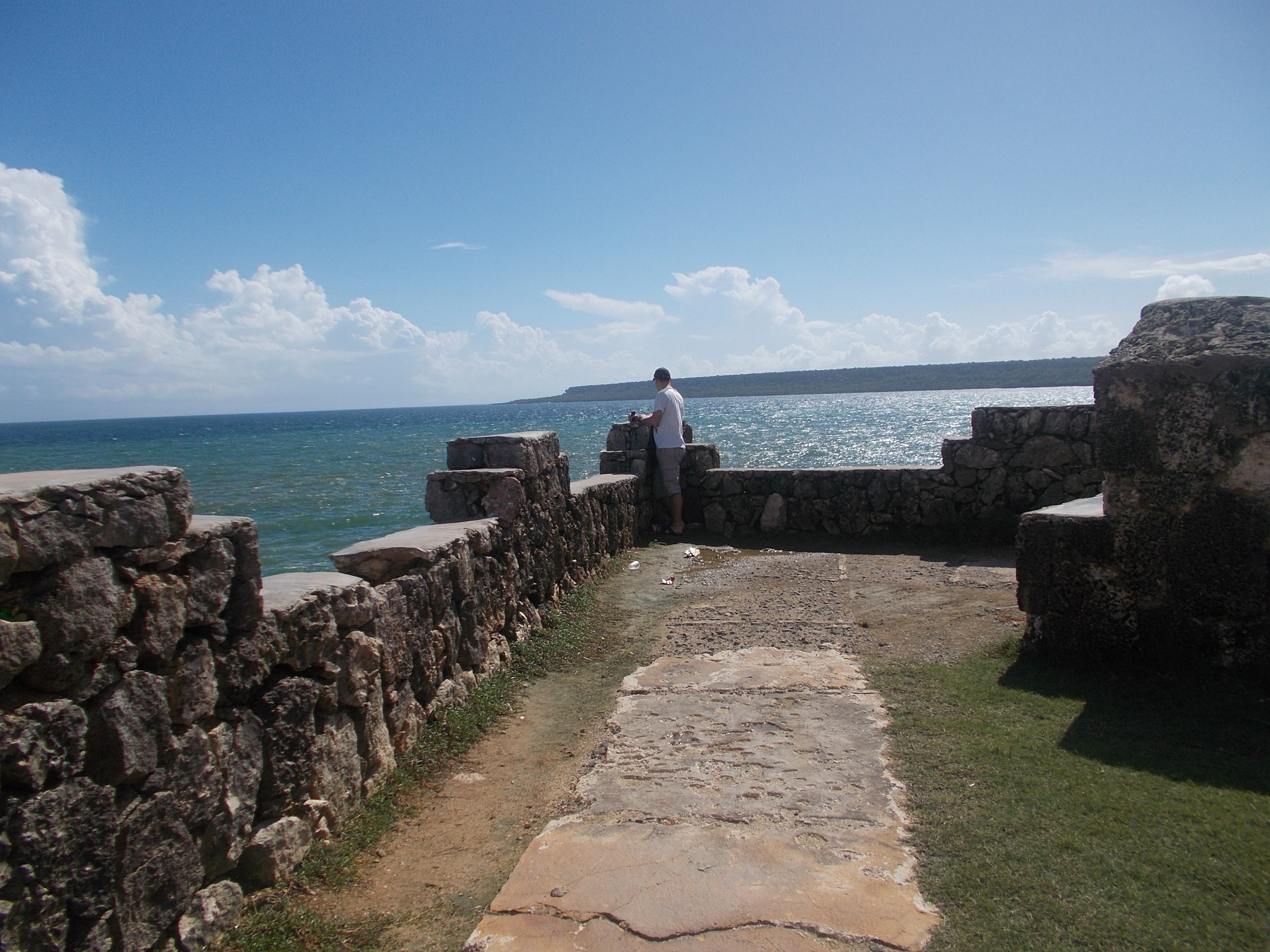
Boca de Yuma fort.

Boca de Yuma had a Spanish colonial fort overlooking the Yuma Bay. The fort held a highly defensible position, with the cannons as the main defense.

On the coastline are the remains of a cannon that is believed to be the same as the one that Archbishop Fernando Navarrete asked for from the King of Spain, in order to defend and protect the Shrine of Our Lady of La Altagracia in Higüey. In 1877 an expedition organized by the baecista of Curaçao found cannons left underwater in Yuma Bay. They were placed as monuments on an ocean cliff where the community park and the historic lighthouse are located. Other guns and battleships remain on the Playa Blanca (White Beach).

One of the great pirates of those times, who defended the poor, was a man named Roberto Cofresi Ramirez de Arellano, born in the coastal town of Cabo Rojo, Puerto Rico. Deep below the river mouth there is a cave, where according to tradition the pirate ship "Cofresi" sank. In 1824, Roberto Cofresí engaged with a Spanish Commander in a fierce battle, after which Cofresí and his crew were captured. His death sentence took place on the morning of March 29, 1825, on the fields of Castillo San Felipe del Morro in Old San Juan, Puerto Rico.

=== Port ===
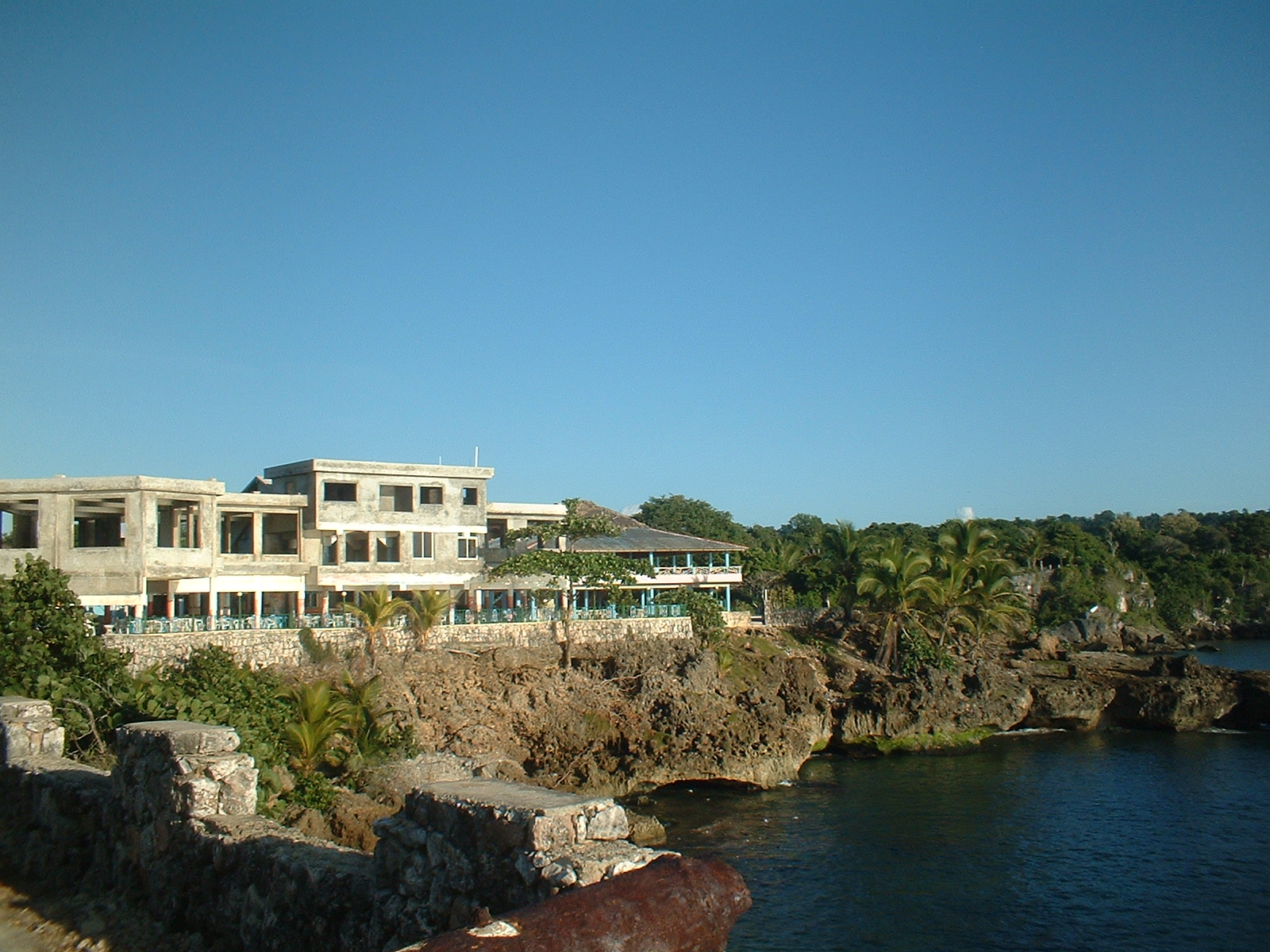
Boca de Yuma harbour.

Boca de Yuma was originally known as the "Port of Higüey." Juan Ponce de León had his ship anchored in the Port of Higüey, and departed from here in 1508, for the conquest of Borinquen, Puerto Rico. In 1513 he left in search of the fountain of eternal youth, and instead made the discovery for subsequent colonization of Spanish Florida.

Boca de Yuma was an important port in the victory over the English in 1655, the Battle of Sabana Real on January 21, 1691, and the Battle of Palo Hincado on November 7, 1808. Those were great military confrontations that changed the eventual history of the Dominican Republic.

On October 29, 1808, the mouth of the Río Yuma at Boca de Yuma was the witness of the support sent by the Governor General Toribio Montes of Puerto Rico to the Port of Higüey for the Battle of Palo Hincado. The material, which has had been embarked in a Brigantine and a goélette included: two small boats equipped with guns, four hundred rifles with bayonets, and two hundred sabers. There were also two hundred volunteers, the majority emigrants from Puerto Rico.

=== Coast ===
On March 4, 1919 the landing began of American sailors to the port of Boca de Yuma from San Pedro de Macoris in the goélette Maria Consuelo, headed by Mr. Catalino Vidal. They settled where the first school was, close to the boat launch beach. Later they built the first concrete school here, named after John F. Kennedy in honor of the Thirty-Fifth President of the United States (1961–1963).

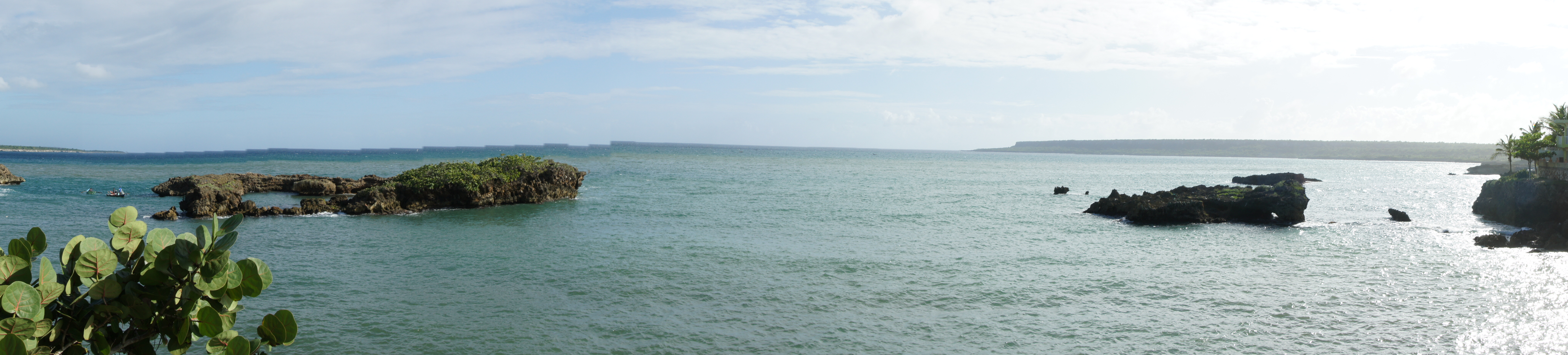
Boca de Yuma landscape.

In 1966, The Incorporated Club Nautical of Santo Domingo installed an extension of the team games recreation area on the coast. It was initiated by Don Alberto Bonetti Burgos, who traveled frequently to Boca De Yuma for fishing and hunting doves.

== Boca de Yuma in the 21st Century ==
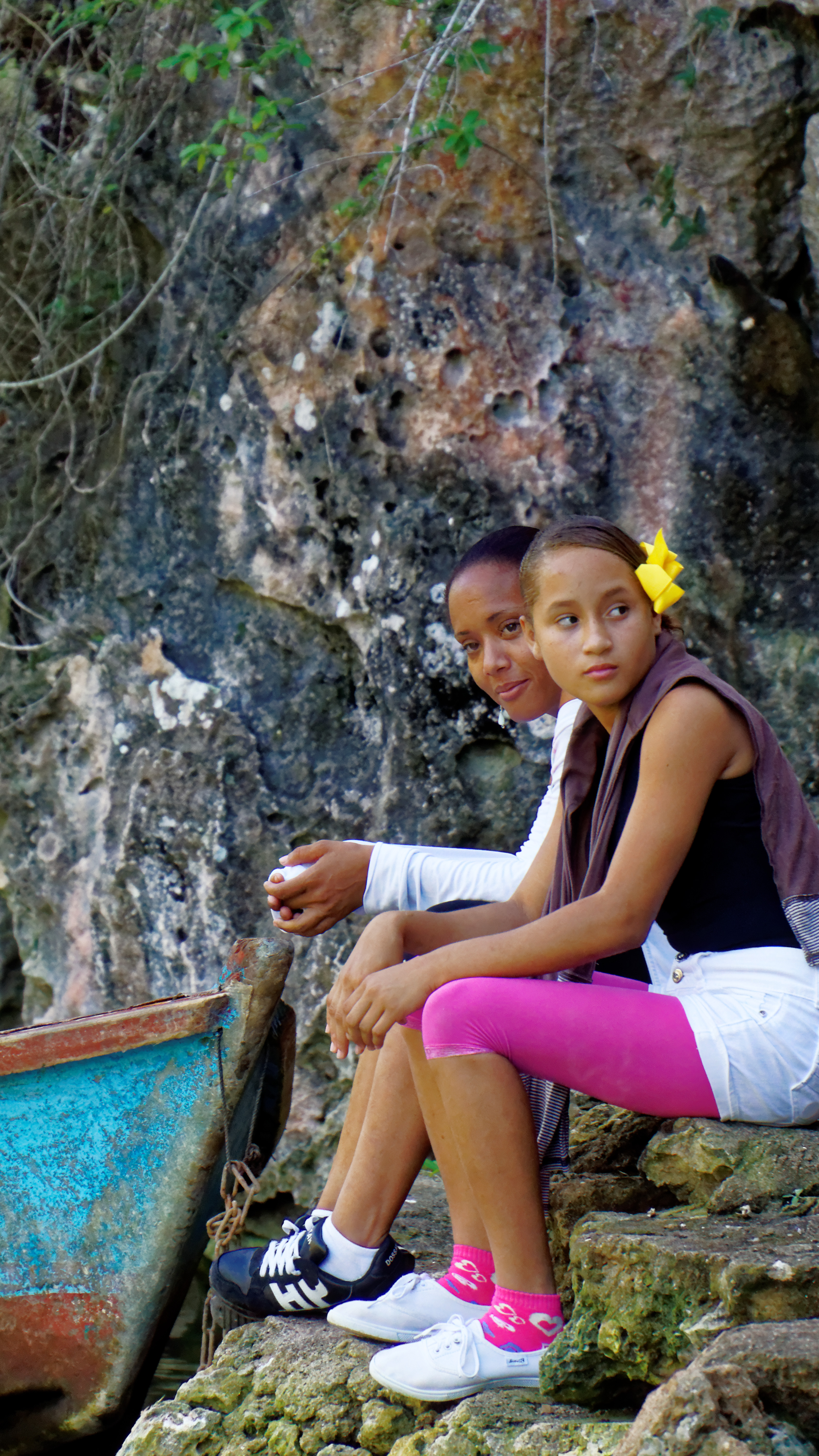
People in Boca de Yuma, Dominican Republic

In 2022, the population was measured as 2,755 individuals. Boca de Yuma is within short distance of La Altagracia province, one-hour drive from Punta Cana, thirty minutes from La Romana city and an hour thirty minutes from the capital city. The fishing town attracts tourists due to opportunities for hunting, fishing, hiking, biking, photography, and exploration. The national park features birds and animals of the region. A navigable river of 1.5 km in length can be travelled by boat, leading to the caves where, according to tradition, the pirate Roberto Cofresí took refugee and hid his treasure.

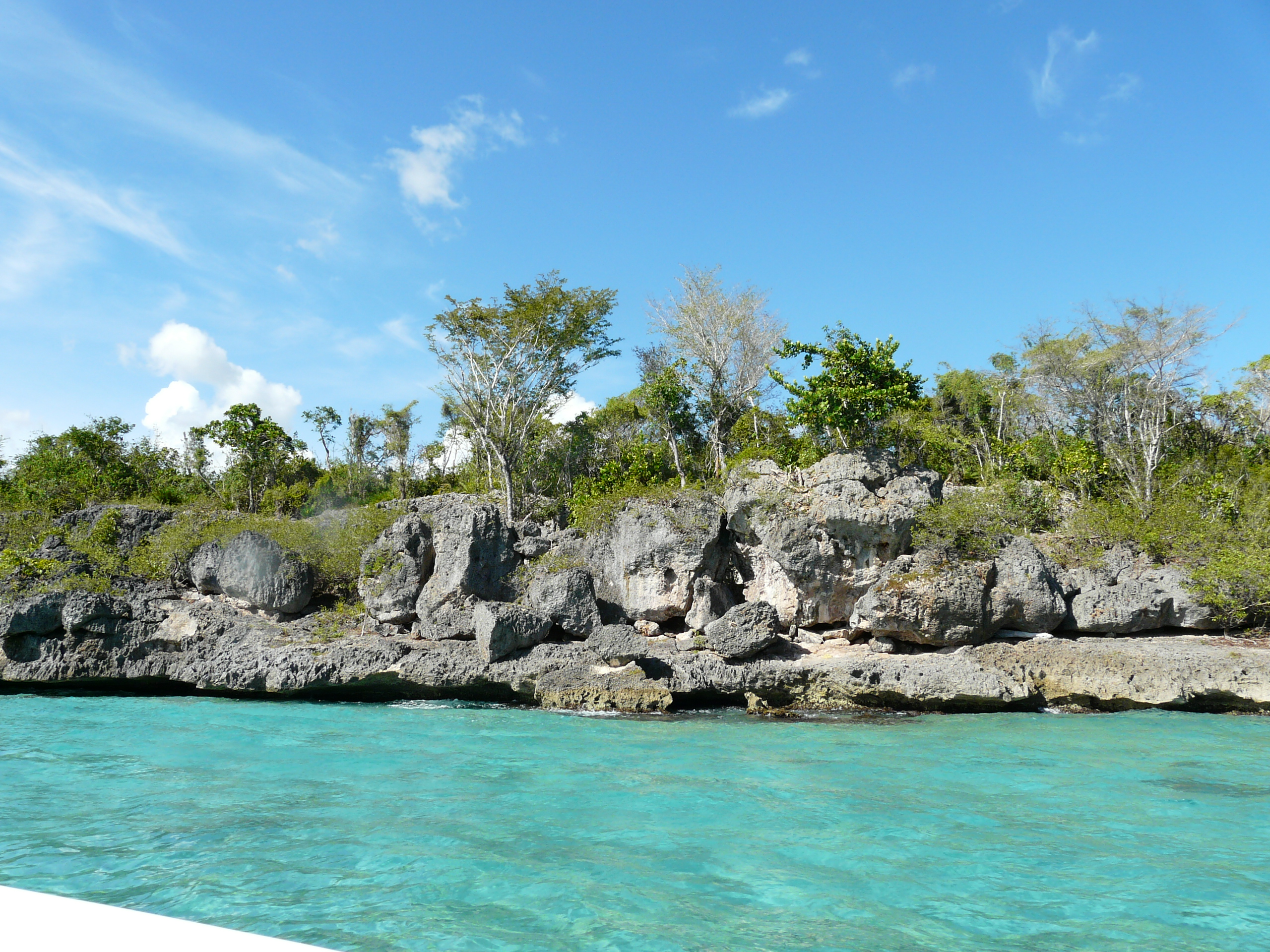
Boca de Yuma.

The Cave Bernard is also popular with tourists due to its stalagmites and stalactites. It was named for a founder of the community, John Bernard.
