= La Altagracia Province =

Province of the Dominican Republic

La Altagracia
- Province
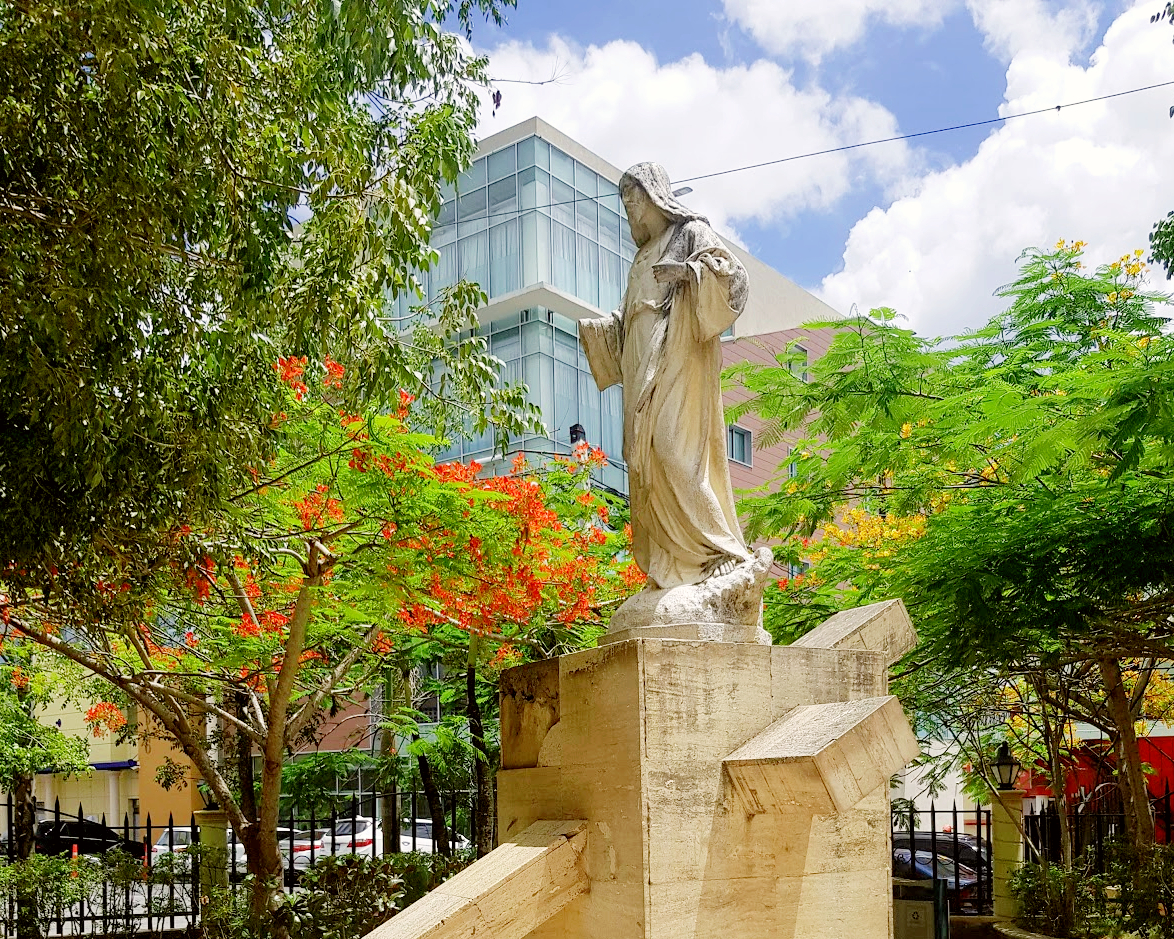
- Higuey, La Altagracia province, Dominican Republic

- Location of the La Altagracia Province
- Country: Dominican Republic
- Province since: 1944
- Capital: Higüey

Government
  - Type: Subdivisions
  - Body: 2 municipalities 5 municipal districts
  - Congresspersons: 1 Senator; 4 Deputies

Area
  - Total: 3,010.34 km^{2} (1,162.30 sq mi)

Population (2022 census)
  - Total: 446,060
  - Density: 148.18/km^{2} (383.77/sq mi)
- Time zone: UTC-4 (EST)
- Area code: 1-809 1-829 1-849
- ISO 3166-2: DO-11
- Postal Code: 23000

La Altagracia (Spanish pronunciation: [la altaˈɣɾasja]) is a province located in the eastern part of the Dominican Republic. It is the only region that borders the Atlantic Ocean and the Caribbean Sea. It is divided into two municipalities and its capital is the beach city of Punta Cana. The province was part of the old La Altagracia Province, which split into two, La Altagracia Province and La Romana Province, on February 27, 1961.

The name "La Altagracia"' meaning the "High Grace" commemorates a painting, Our Lady of Altagracia, which was brought to this area from Spain in the early 16th century. Numerous miracles are attributed to the image.

La Altagracia province is a leading province in the country's tourism industry due to the presence of Punta Cana, widely considered a major part of the country's economy. It is serviced by Punta Cana International Airport, which is by far the busiest airport on the island.

== History ==
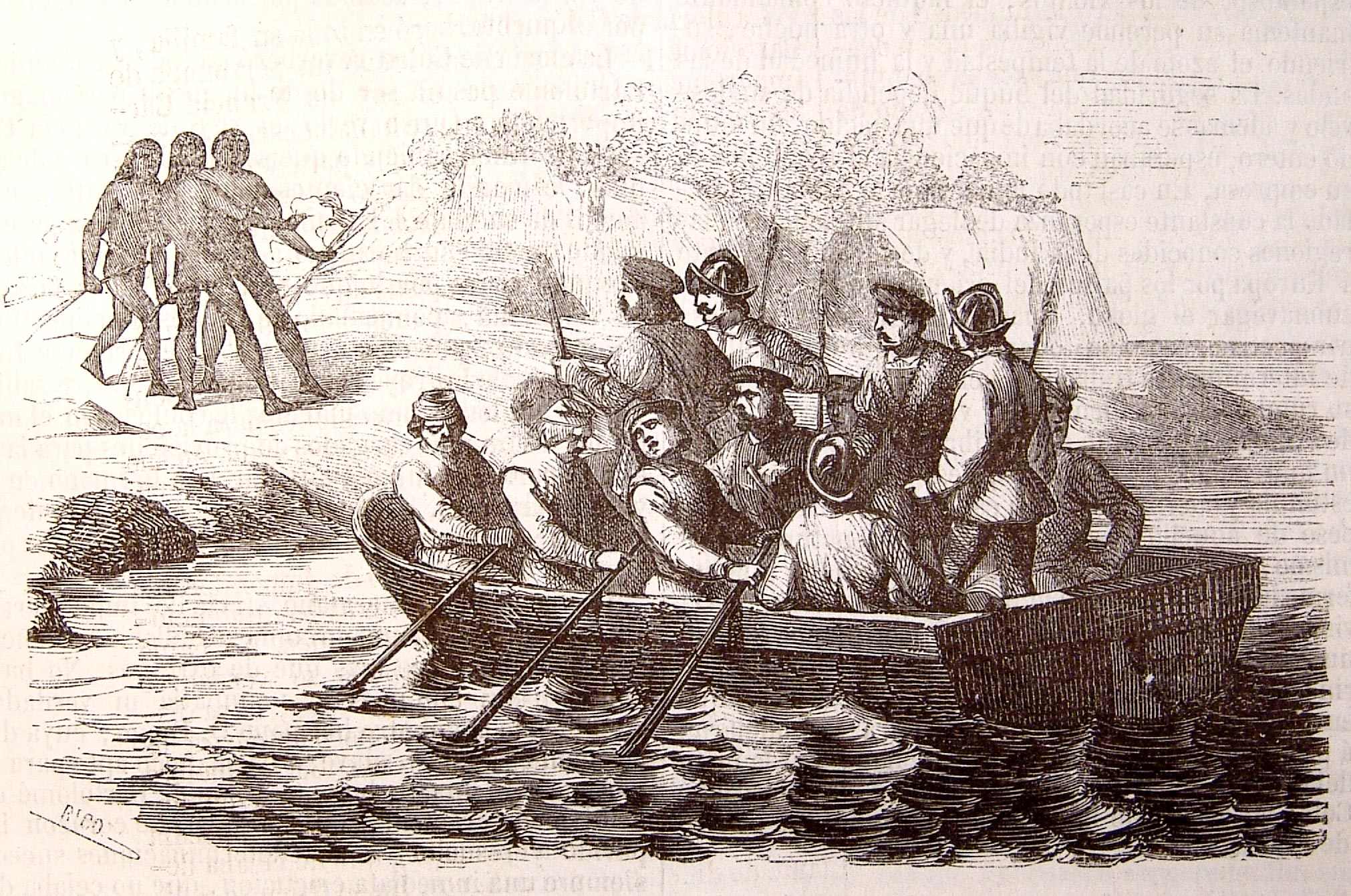
Christopher Columbus travelling to Higuey

By 1505, Juan de Esquivel conquered the Taino chiefdom of Higuey and founded a fortress which he converted in 1506 by order of Ovando into a town, calling it Salvaleón de Higuey.

Years later, by Royal Privilege dispatched from Seville on December 7, 1508, this town was awarded the coat of arms. During the Spanish colonial period, Higüey remained as the Parish of the Seibo party. When the Republic was proclaimed in 1844, the Central Government Board designated it as a common part of the Department of El Seibo.

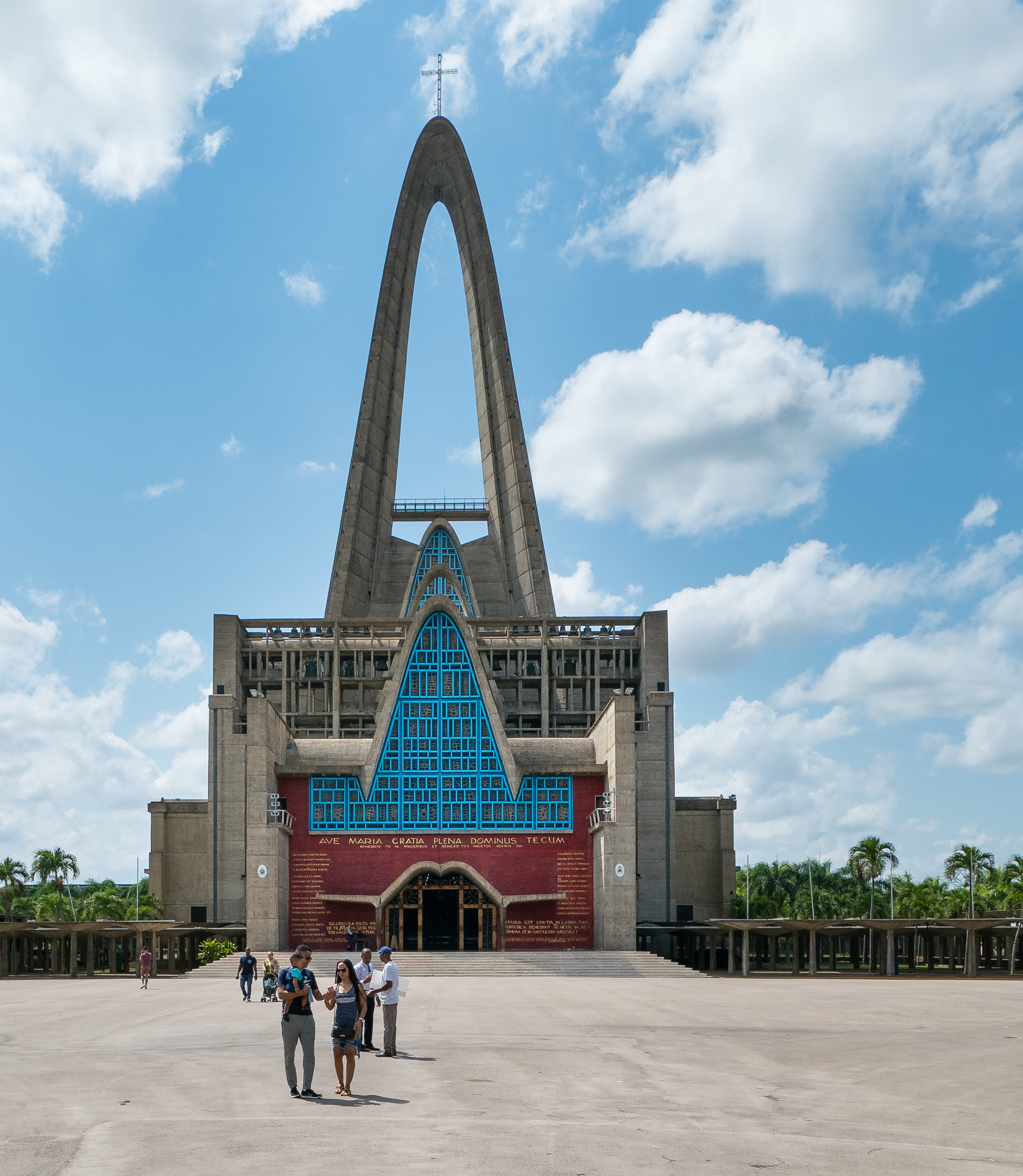
Cathedral of Higuey

It was not until 1959, during the dictatorship of Rafael Leónidas Trujillo, that the province of La Altagracia was officially created, occupying the eastern part of what belonged to the province of La Romana, which at that time was called Altagracia already for in 1945 when Higüey was elevated to a province under the name of Altagracia.

The Basílica Catedral Nuestra Señora de la Altagracia is located in Higüey and is one of the most important religious monuments in the Dominican Republic. It is the place of invocation of the Virgen de la Altagracia. The basilica was inaugurated on January 21, 1971, to replace the old sanctuary built in 1572. On October 12, 1970, it was declared a national monument. This basilica is a large structure in the shape of a Latin cross. The entrance door is made of gold-plated bronze and was blessed by Pope John Paul II in Rome. It has a bell tower with 45 bronze bells.

== Geography ==
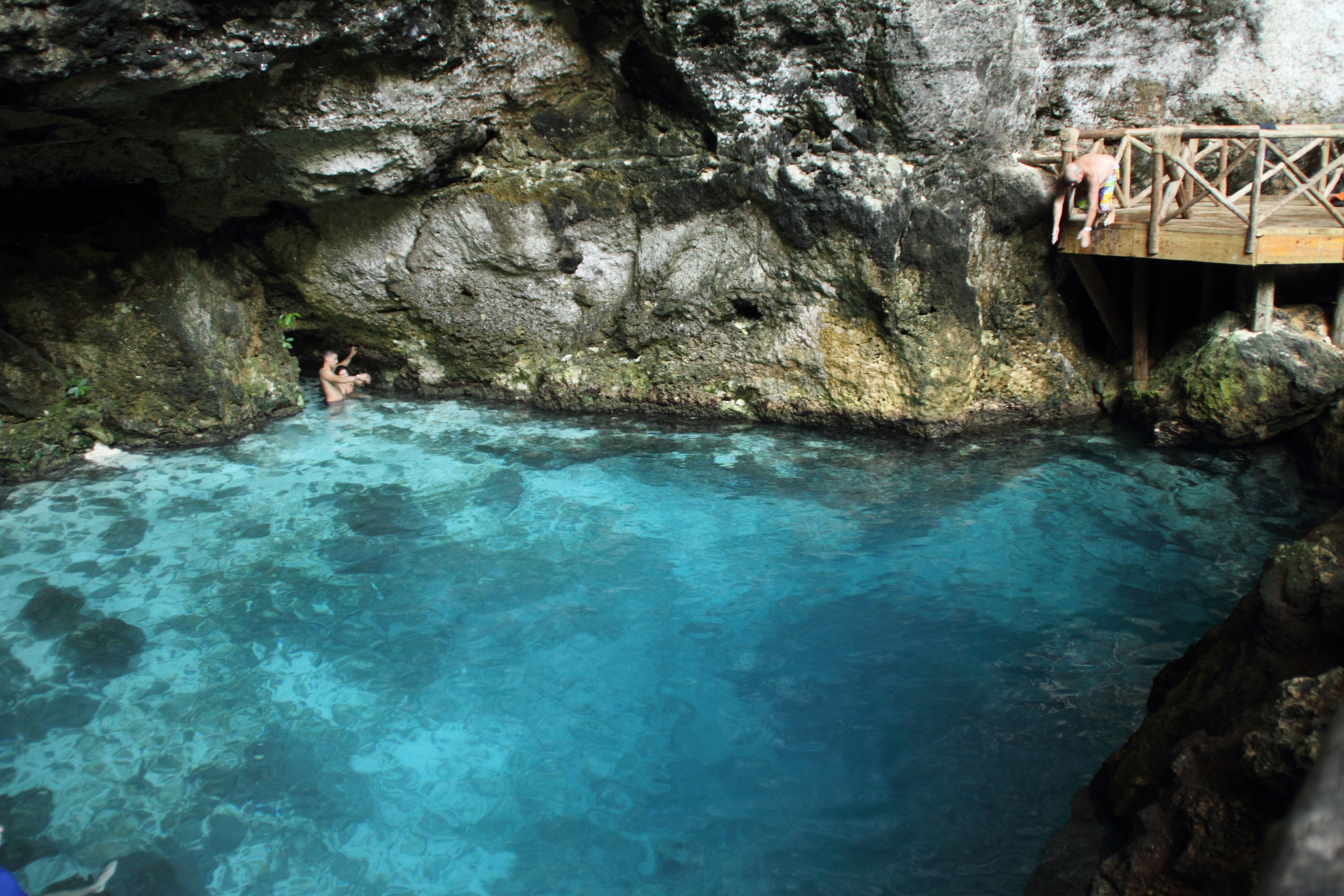
Hoyo Azul in Punta Cana, Dominican Republic

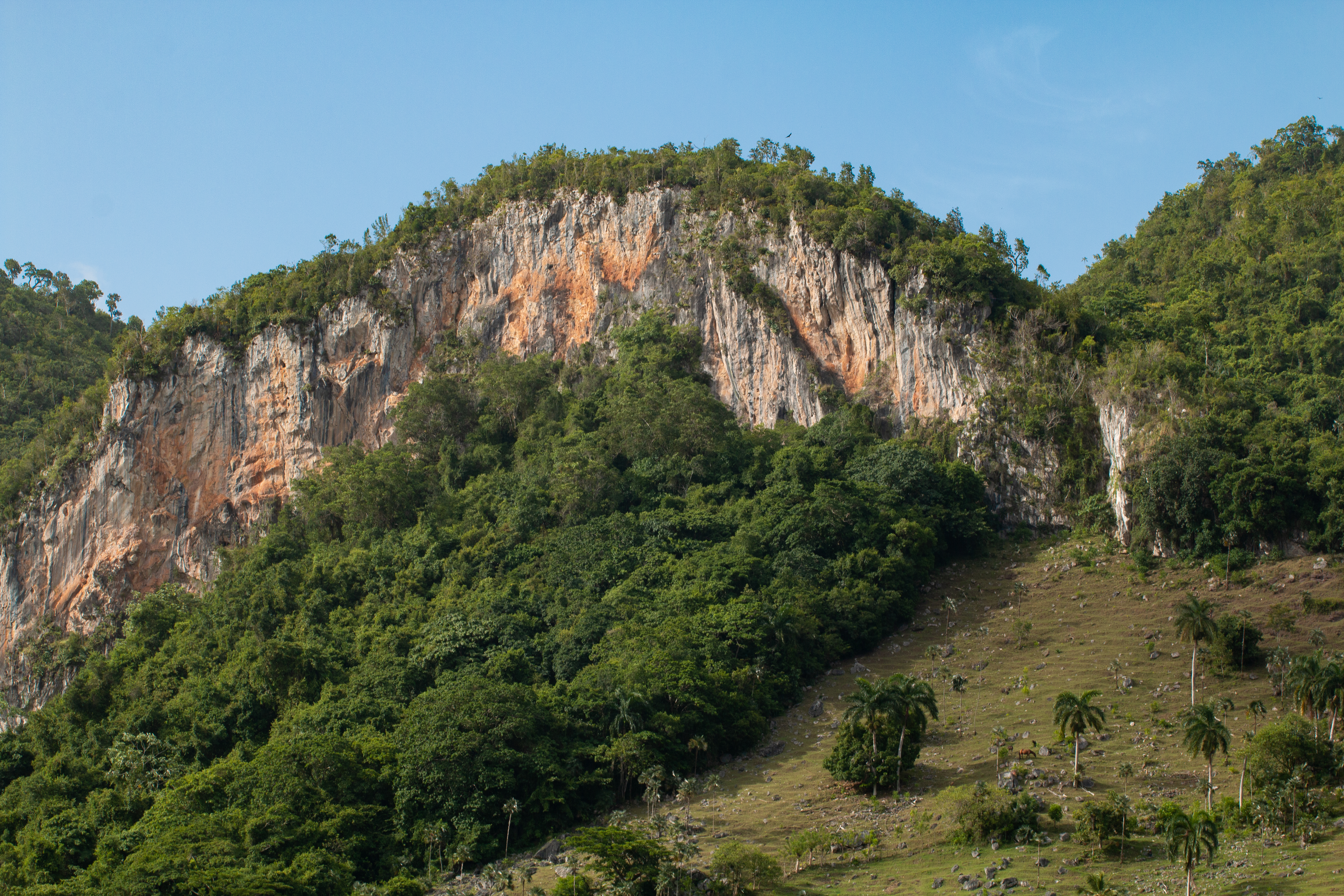
Hills in Higuey, Dominican Republic

La Altagracia is the second largest province in the country with an extension of 3,010.34 km^{2} (1,162.30 sq mi). This province limits to the north with the Atlantic Ocean, to the south with the Caribbean Sea, to the east with the Mona channel and to the west with the provinces of La Romana and El Seibo. The beaches of La Altagracia are world-famous; beaches like Macao, Bávaro, and Juanillo are known for their white sand and crystal-clear waters. However, these beaches are not only ideal for tourism, as they are also important for the conservation of sea turtles and other endangered species.

The most important river in the province is the Yuma, other rivers of consideration are in Duey, Maimon, Chavon, Anamuya, Sanate and Yonu. La Altagracia is part of the coastal plains of the Caribbean, so the southern part of the province presents a relatively flat relief in contrast to other regions of the country. Towards the north are the foothills of the Eastern Cordillera, where the Old Hill rises, which with its 736 meters (2,415 ft) high is the highest in the province.

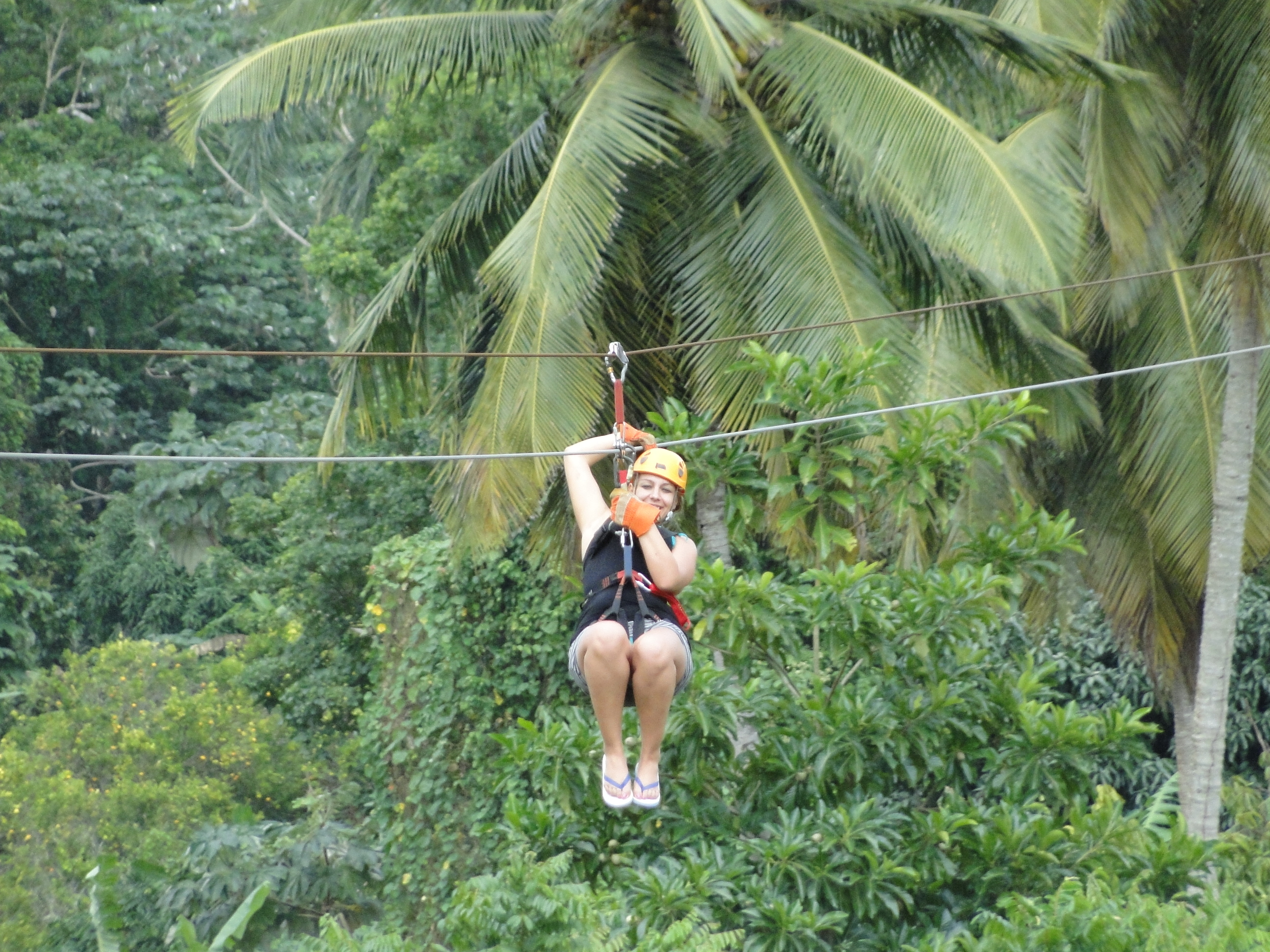
Zipline in Bavaro Park

In the province there are three protected areas: the Eastern National Park, the Bávaro lagoon, and the Maimón lagoon. The National Park of the East (also known as Cotubanamá National Park) is the habitat of a varied terrestrial, marine and bird biodiversity, of which 112 species have been recorded, eight of which are endemic to the country and eleven to the Caribbean. Among the marine species native to this park are turtles, dolphins, and manatees. The park is located on a peninsula trapezoidal in shape and measures 310 square kilometres (120 sq mi), also incorporating Saona Island. The park has hiking trails that connect to caves and springs.

The Bávaro lagoon is the habitat of the cyprinodon nichollsi, a fish that is in danger of extinction, and is a refuge for migratory ducks.

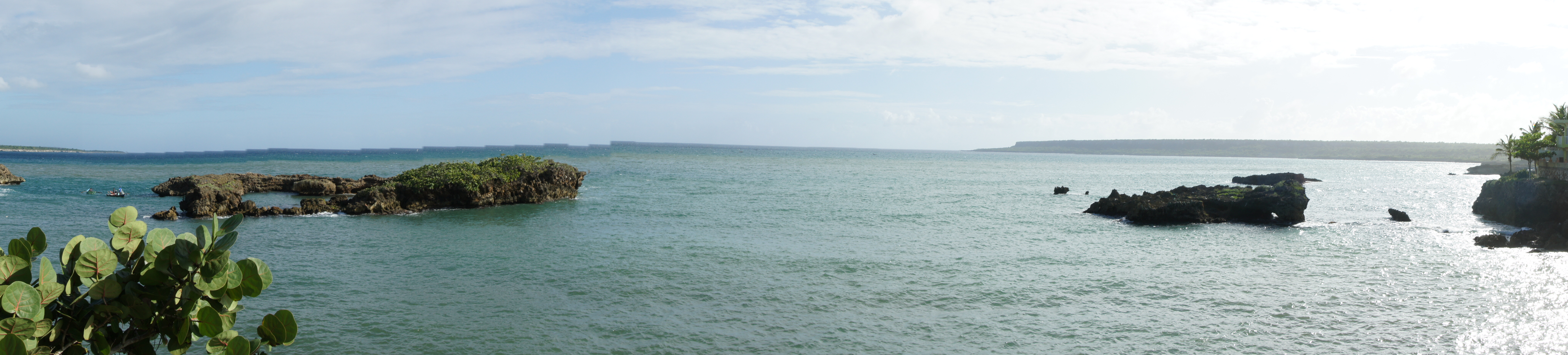
Boca de Yuma (Mouth of the Yuma) river

== Economy ==
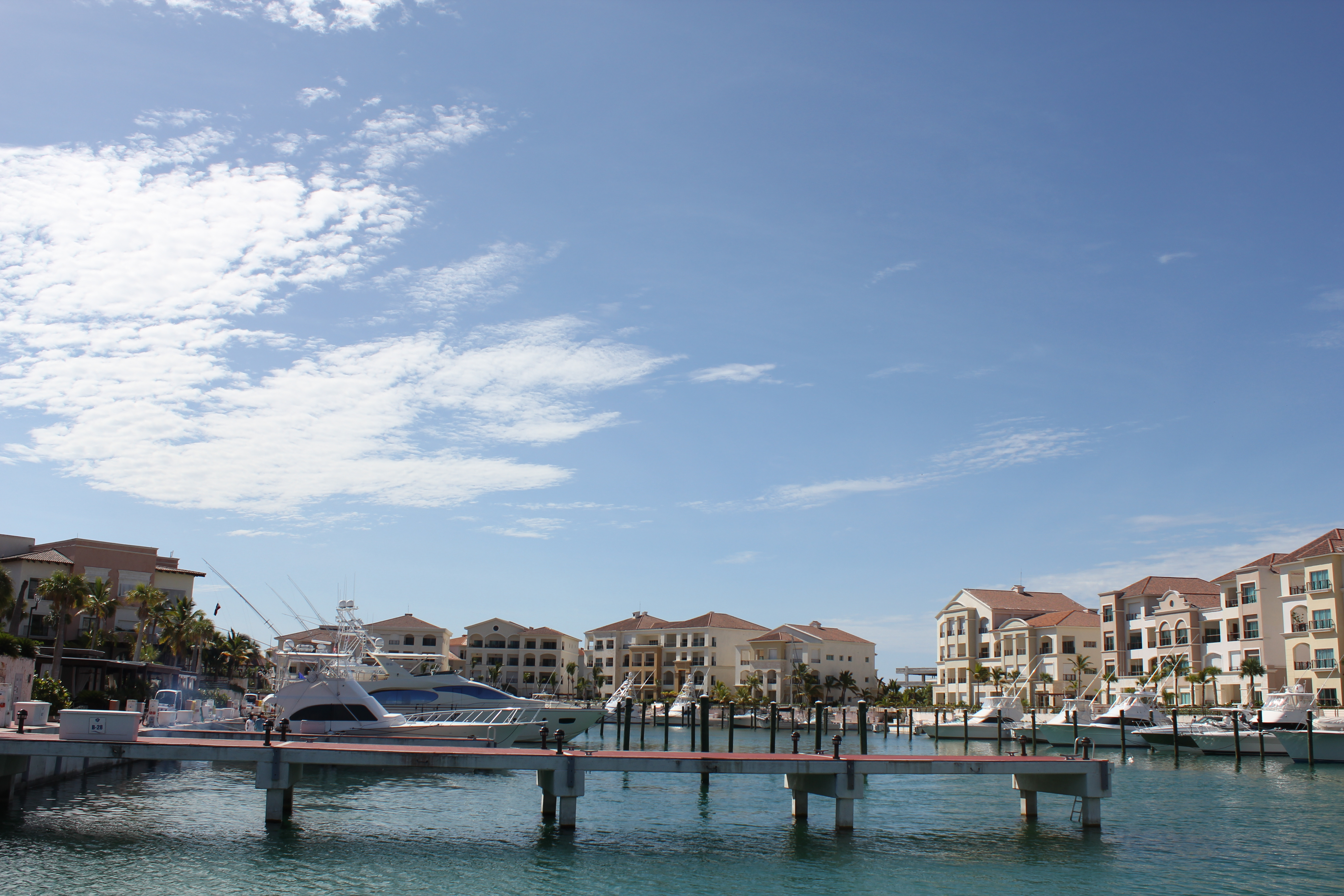
Punta Cana Marina

Tourism is one of the main economic activities in the province. The province's coastal strip concentrates a dense infrastructure of master-planned beach resorts that drive the local hospitality sector. It has first-class international hotel complexes, which places it in one of the main tourist destinations in the Caribbean and the entire Latin America region, which represent a very important source of income for the province, the destinations of Bávaro and Punta Cana being especially well known.

The province also has a notable economic activity based on extensive cattle ranching and agriculture. It is estimated that it has around 775,000 hectares of the province are dedicated to cattle ranching, which places it as the second province in the largest number of cattle. Agricultural activity comes hand in hand with the production of sugar cane and rice, as well as the production of corn, beans, and different foods such as cassava, plantain, yams and sweet potato. Fishing is also common on the coastal areas, not only as a traditional economic activity, but also as a tourist and sports activity.

== Population ==
In the 2010 census, La Altagracia had a population of 273,210 inhabitants, of which 143,010 were men and 130,200 women. Of the total population, 77.8% of the people corresponded to the urban population and 22.2% to the rural population. The most populated city is Higüey with an urban population of 147,978 inhabitants, which represents 54.2% of the total in the province.

This province had an average annual growth rate in the 2002–2010 period of 5.1%, being the province with the highest growth in the country and being above the national growth rate, which was 1.2%. In the previous period (1993–2002), La Altagracia also had the highest population growth in the country.

In the 2022 census, La Altagracia had a population of 446,060 inhabitants, of which 222,866 were men and 223,194 women. Of the total population, 76.8% of the people corresponded to the urban population and 23.2% to the rural population. The most populated city is Higüey with an urban population of 327,886 inhabitants.

== Municipalities and municipal districts ==
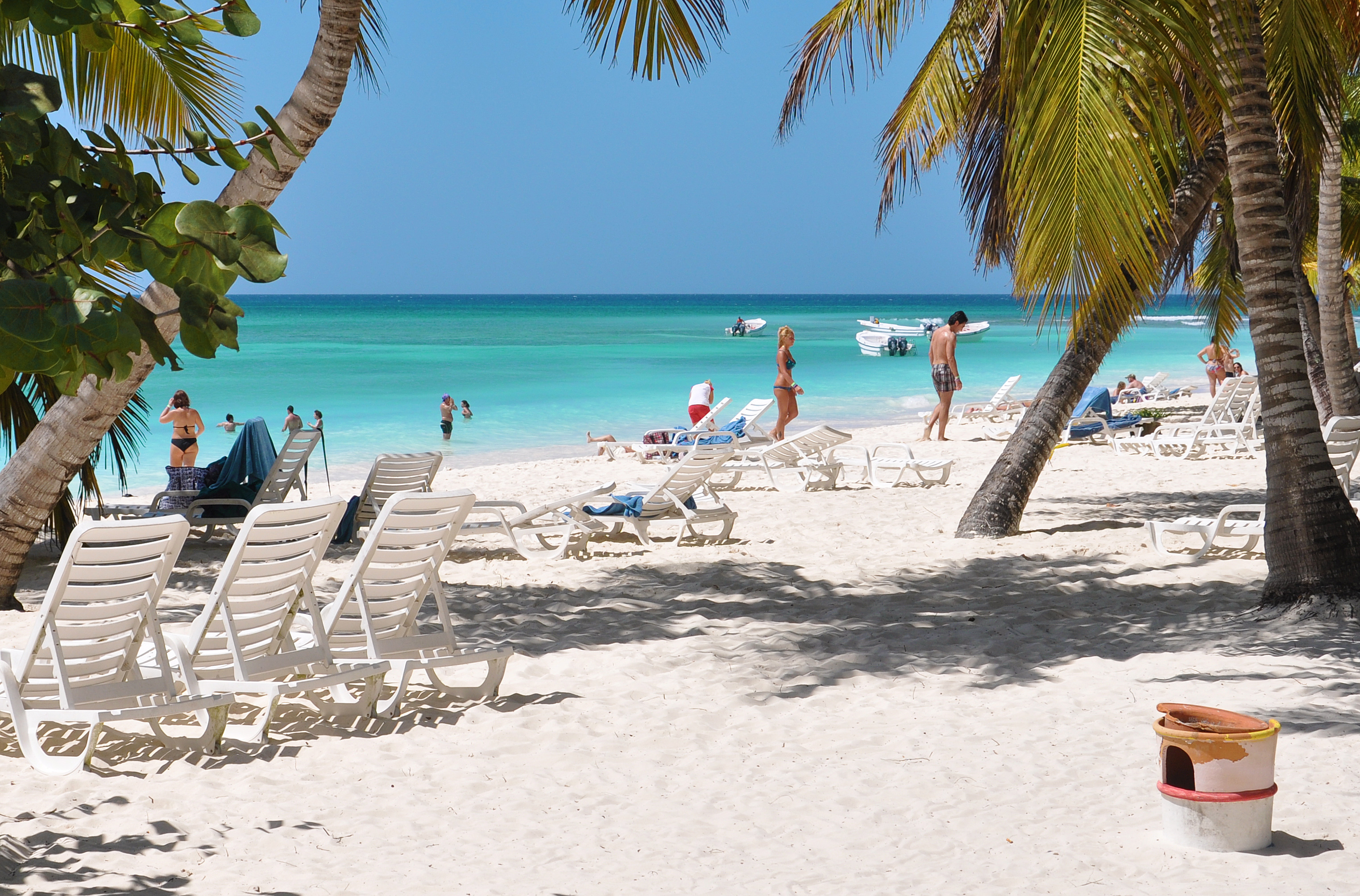
Saona Island in the Province of La Altagracia

The province as of June 20, 2006, is divided into the following municipalities (municipios) and municipal districts (distrito municipal - M.D.) within them:

- Salvaleón de Higüey
  - Lagunas de Nisibon (M.D.)
  - La Otra Banda (M.D.)
  - Verón-Punta Cana (M.D.)
- San Rafael del Yuma
  - Boca de Yuma (M.D.)
  - Bayahibe (M.D.)
- Saona
  - Isla Catalina (M.D.)

The following is a sortable table of the municipalities and municipal districts with population figures as of the 2014 estimate. Urban population are those living in the seats (cabeceras literally heads) of municipalities or of municipal districts. Rural population are those living in the districts (Secciones literally sections) and neighborhoods (Parajes literally places) outside them. The population figures are from the 2014 population estimate. For comparison with the municipalities and municipal districts of other provinces see the list of municipalities and municipal districts of the Dominican Republic.

Name	Total population	Urban population	Rural population
Higüey	322,266	281,061	41,205
San Rafael del Yuma	50,023	31,482	18,541
La Altagracia province	372,289	312,543	59,746
