= Albergo Diffuso =

Type of hotel spread out in a community

The Albergo Diffuso is a form of hotel where guest rooms are spread out in various buildings within a small town or community, generally of historical significance. The concept was launched in Italy in the early 1980s as a means of reviving small, historic Italian villages and town centres that are off the usual tourist track. The term is translated into English as "dispersed hotel", "scattered hotel" or "virtual hotel". It has to conform to the following conditions:

- Run directly by an individual owner and providing normal hotel services
- Rooms distributed in existing converted buildings in historic centres
- Central reception area with food available
- Part of a genuine community so that guests can be part of local life

The idea was promulgated by Giancarlo Dall’Ara. As of 2010, there were more than 40 Italian Alberghi Diffusi, grouped under a national association, and 13 Italian regions had adopted legislation regulating the concept. The Albergo Diffuso has also been adopted outside Italy, in Croatia and Switzerland, notably in the Swiss town of Corippo. The Dominican Republic has adopted the model in the town of Bayahíbe.
