= Otra Banda =

- Location within the Dominican Republic
- Coordinates: 18°39′0″N 68°40′12″W
- Country: Dominican Republic
- Province: La Altagracia

Population (2008)
  - Total: 7,146

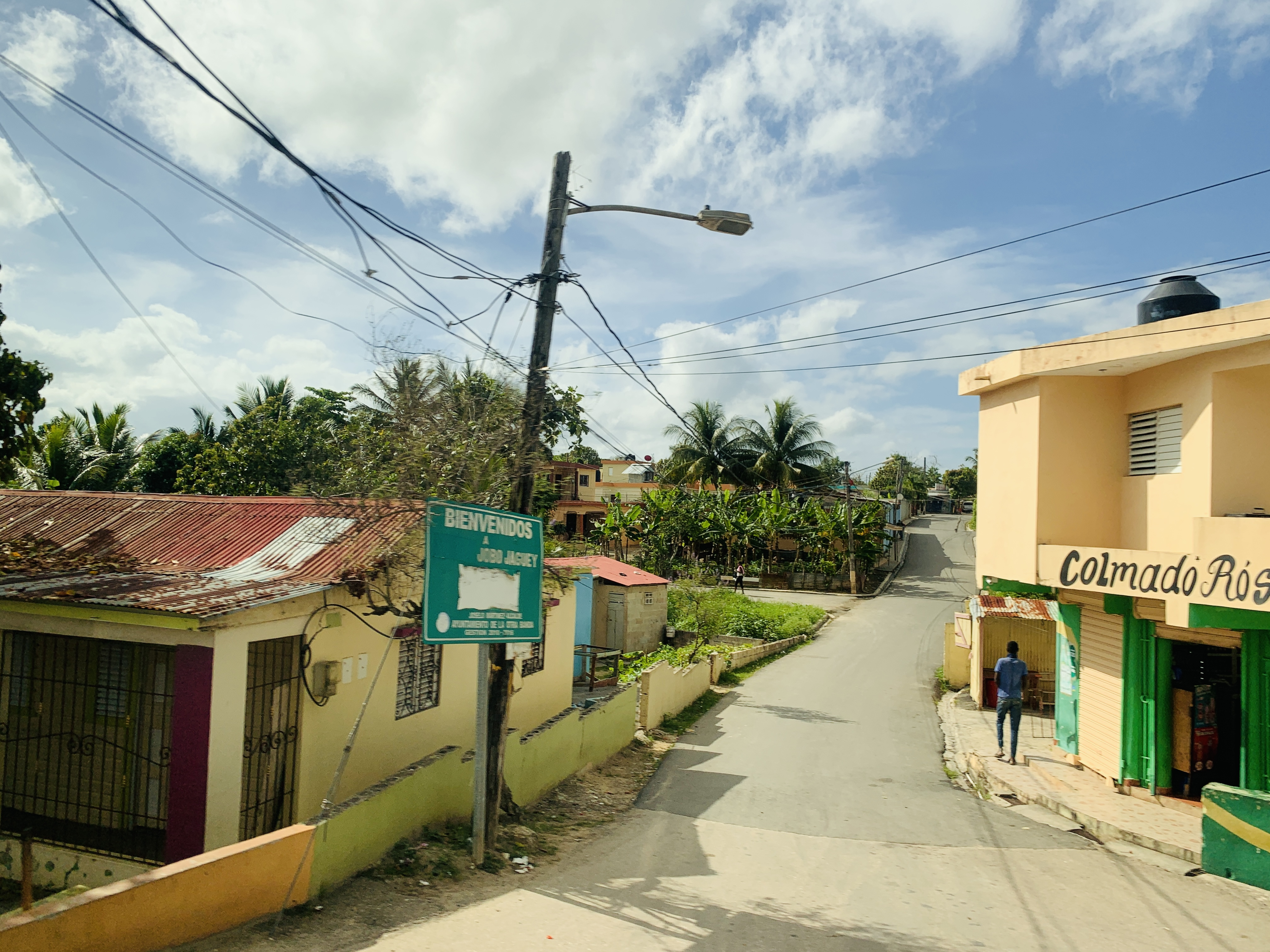
Otra Banda

Otra Banda is a town in the La Altagracia province of the Dominican Republic.

== Sources ==
- – World-Gazetteer.com
