= Lagunas de Nisibón =

Coordinates: 18.83°N 68.67°W

Las Lagunas de Nisibón Laguna de Nisibon
- Interactive map of Las Lagunas de Nisibón
- Country: Dominican Republic
- Province: La Altagracia

Population (2008)
  - Total: 6 144

Lagunas de Nisibón is a town in the La Altagracia province of the Dominican Republic.

== Sources ==
- – World-Gazetteer.com
