= Bayahíbe =

Town and municipality in the Dominican Republic

- Distrito Municipal
- Motto: Pueblo Encantado
- Location within the Dominican Republic
- Coordinates: 18°22′N 68°50′W
- Country: Dominican Republic
- Province: La Altagracia

Area
  - Total: 215.2 km^{2} (83.1 sq mi)

Population (2022 census)
  - Total: 5,618
  - Density: 26.11/km^{2} (67.61/sq mi)
- Time zone: UTC-4 (Atlantic)
- Postal code: 23000
- Area code: 809

Bayahíbe is a town in the Dominican Republic, located about 10 miles (16 km) east of La Romana on the shore of the Caribbean Sea with 5,618 inhabitants (2022). Founded as a fishing village in 1874 by Juan Brito and his family, who came from Puerto Rico, the town is now a tourist destination.

== Etymology ==
Bayahíbe is an indigenous word. Its meaning is not known for sure, but there are many names that include the Tainos word "Baya." "Baya" is the name given to a bivalve mollusk, like clams that are glued to the rocks or roots of mangrove trees. "Jib" (or "hib") is the name of a sieve manufactured from sticks used to sift cassava flour.

== Tourism ==
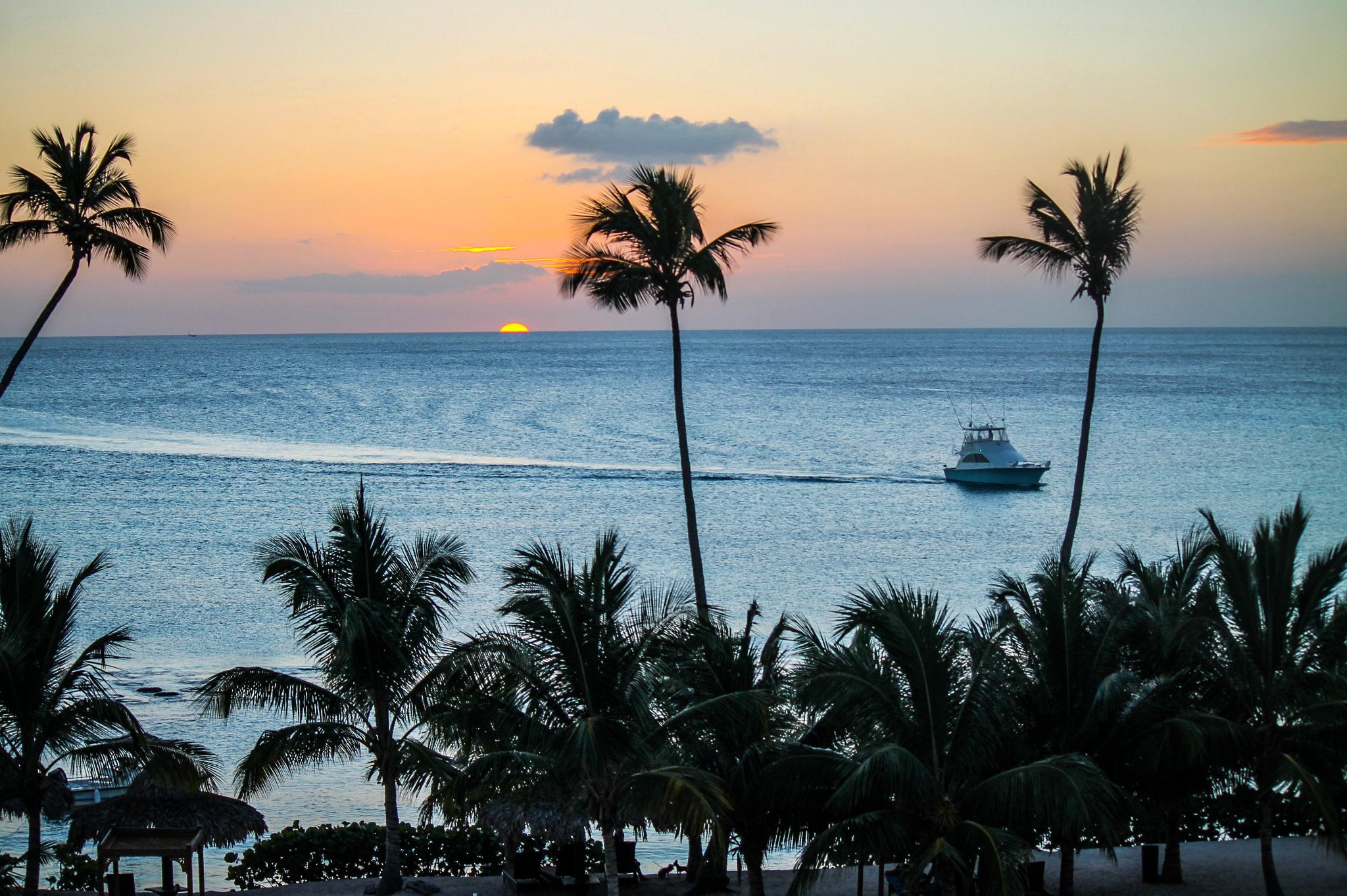
Sunset in Bayahíbe beach

Bayahíbe Beach, a public beach, is located less than a mile from the town center, and Dominicus Beach is in about three miles' distance. Bayahíbe serves as an embarkation point for boat trips to Saona Island, a thinly inhabited island with extensive beaches located in a national park. Numerous large resorts are located in the vicinity of Bayahíbe. The town has an Albergo Diffuso named Bayahibe Village, founded by Fabrizio Annunzi.

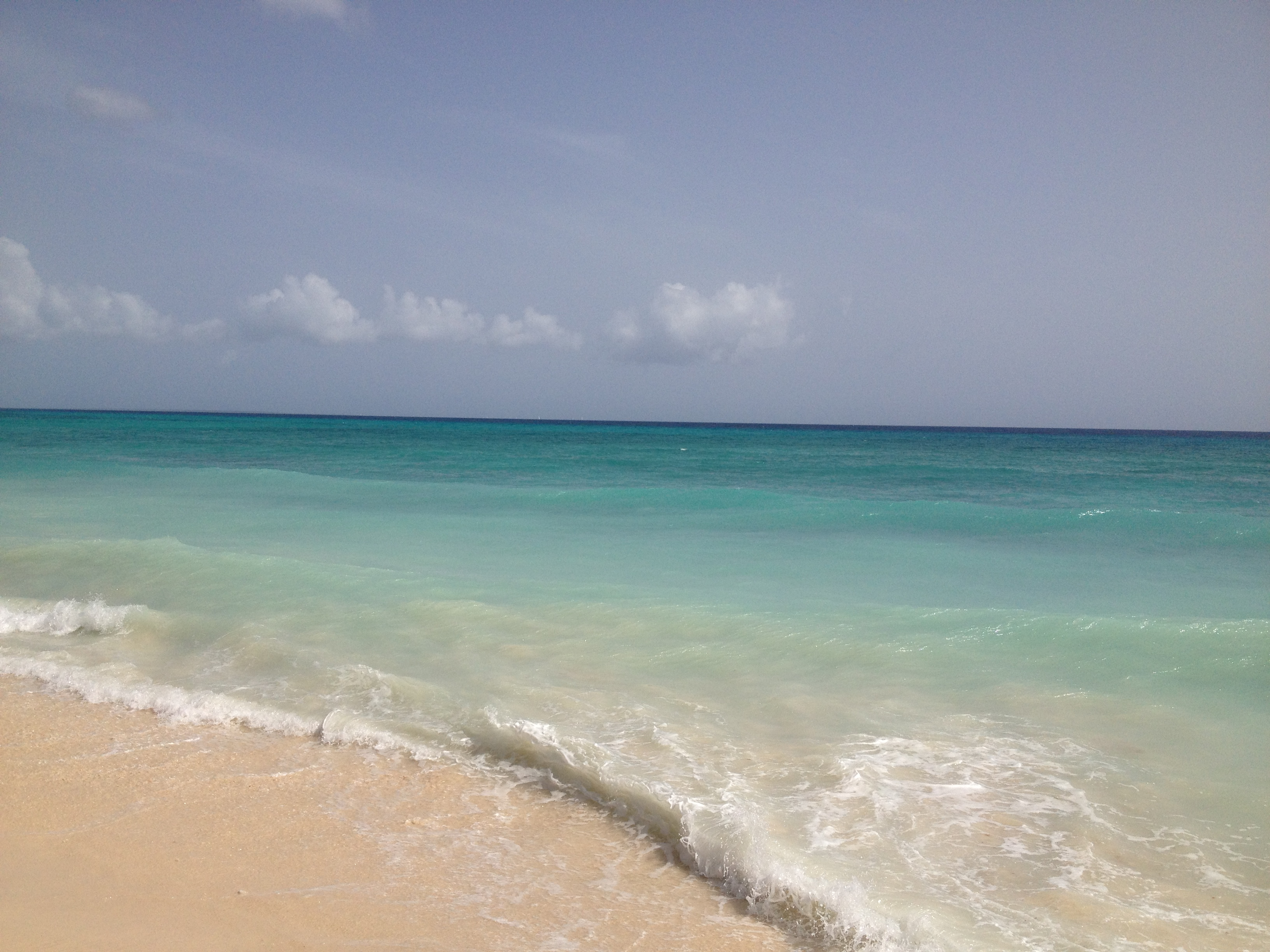
Bayahibe beach.

Scuba diving is practiced in Bayahíbe—Bayahíbe. There are three shipwrecks in the area including the Atlantic Princess, St George and Coco.

== Notable events ==
On October 12, 2002, Audrey Mestre, French world record-setting free-diver, died while attempting to free-dive to a depth of 171 metres (561 ft) off the coast of Bayahíbe.
