= Juan de Esquivel =

Spanish explorer

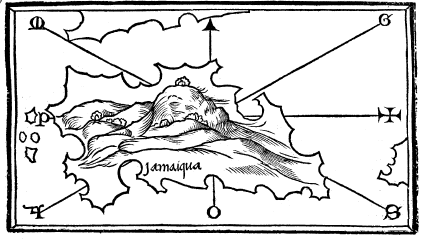
Map of Jamaica in 1528

Juan de Esquivel (c. 1480 – c. 1513) was a Spanish colonist and first governor of the Colony of Santiago, now Jamaica.

== Biography ==
=== Conquistador ===
Juan de Esquivel was a native of Seville, the son of Pedro de Esquivel and Constanza Fernandez de Arauz. His grandfather, Gabriel Sánchez, had been a controller of customs in Seville. Juan de Esquivel accompanied Christopher Columbus in 1493 on his second voyage to the West Indies where he settled on Hispaniola. In 1502 the governor of the Indies, Nicolás de Ovando, sent Esquivel with 400 men to subjugate the Tainos on the eastern end of the island. The region was depopulated and many of the defeated natives were made slaves. As a young man, Bartolomé de las Casas was part of the Spanish force and later wrote about the violence he witnessed. Las Casas claimed that Esquivel led a second expedition against the Tainos, wiping out the population and taking thousands as prisoners in 1504, but Esquivel had returned to Spain during this period.

Among the prisoners taken was the cacique Cotubanamá who was taken to the city of Santo Domingo, where he was hanged. Once the region was pacified in 1505, Esquivel founded a fortress and the town of Salvaleón de Higüey in 1506.

=== Procurador in Hispaniola ===
Around 1504 Esquivel was named a procurador (legal representative) for the towns of Hispaniola and sent to Spain to request relief from the heavy tax on gold mining as well as better terms on trade of imported goods. The king agreed to reduce the royal tax on gold production from one-third to one-fifth of the output and put an end to the royal monopoly on trade with the islands.

After Columbus died in 1506, his son Diego Colón established his claim as hereditary viceroy of lands discovered by his father. Colón returned to Hispaniola in 1509 and learned that Jamaica had been partitioned between two Spaniards unfriendly to his regime. He sent Esquivel to subdue the island with seventy men. Pánfilo de Narváez served as second-in-command. Esquivel apparently brought along his wife and daughters; in 1513 the family was given permission to import three slaves.

=== Foundation of Sevilla la Nueva ===
The island was quickly subjugated and Esquivel founded the towns of Sevilla la Nueva on the north coast and Santa Gloria. No gold was discovered on Jamaica but the soil was fertile and the Spaniards were instructed to use native labor to grow food crops for the mainland and the other islands. King Ferdinand instructed Colón to treat the Jamaican natives with care so that "they may increase and not diminish as has been the case in Espaniola." Without gold, the colony was not as prosperous as hoped and in early 1512 it was even suggested that the colonists relocate to Cuba where Diego Velázquez de Cuéllar was attempting to establish Spanish control of the island. The relocation never took place but Esquivel did send Narváez and thirty crossbowmen to Cuba to assist Velázquez.

=== Dismissal and Death ===
Ferdinand was unhappy with the leadership in Jamaica. He acknowledged that Colón spoke highly of Esquivel but he suspected that the lack of gold was the result of some sort of fraud. He also complained that Esquivel had failed "in the conversion of the Indians and pacification of the island as well as in the increase of our royal revenues." He ordered that a residencia (audit) be taken for Esquivel's term in office, an action that typically coincided with an official's dismissal. The subsequent timing is not clear but by the end of 1513, Esquivel was dead and a royal decree granted his widow 300 pesos of gold. In November 1514, Esquivel had been replaced by Francisco de Garay.

According to Bryan Edwards, he was "one of the few Castilians...distinguished for generosity and humanity".

== Essequibo River ==
The Essequibo river was named after Esquivel. When Alonso de Ojeda made the first explorations of the estuary at the mouth of the Orinoco in 1499, he called it the Dulce River, which means sweet river in Spanish.

== See also ==
- Colony of Santo Domingo
- Colony of Santiago (Jamaica)
- Spanish West Indies

== Bibliography ==
- Arranz Marquez, Luis. "Juan de Esquivel". Real Academia de la Historia (in Spanish).
- Cundall, Frank; Pietersz, Joseph Luckert. (1919). Jamaica under the Spaniards, abstracted from the archives of Seville. Kingston: Jamaica, Institute of Jamaica.
- Edwards, Bryan (1794). An Abridgment of Mr. Edwards's Civil and Commercial History of the British West Indies: In Two Volumes. J. Parsons ... and J. Bell.
- Floyd, Troy S. (1973). The Columbus Dynasty in the Caribbean, 1492-1526 (First ed.). Albuquerque: University of New Mexico Press. ISBN 0-8263-0283-1. OCLC 790464.
- Howgego, Raymond John, ed. (2003). "Esquivel, Juan de". Encyclopedia of Exploration to 1800. Hordern House. pp. 358–359. ISBN 1875567364.
- Sauer, Carl Ortwin (1966). The Early Spanish Main. University of California Press. pp. 178–181.
- Thomas, Hugh (2003). Rivers of Gold : the Rise of the Spanish Empire, from Columbus to Magellan (1st U.S. ed.). New York: Random House. ISBN 0-375-50204-1. OCLC 53896784.
