= Yuma River (Dominican Republic) =

Coordinates: 18.379°N 68.604°W

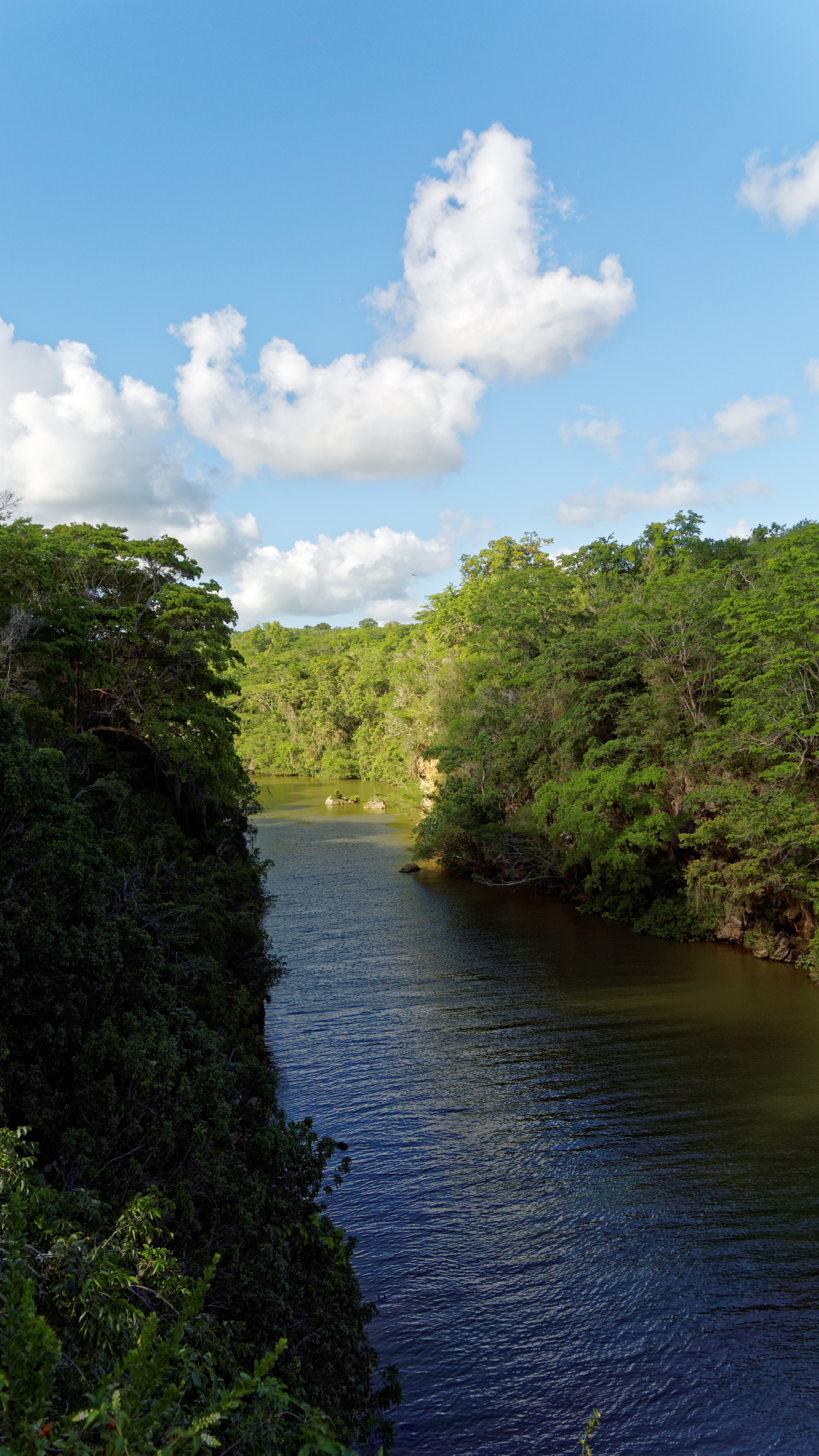

Location
- Country: Dominican Republic

The Yuma River is a river of the Dominican Republic.

== See also ==
- List of rivers of the Dominican Republic
