= Centro de Remo y Canotaje Presa de Rincón =

Rowing, Canoeing and Kayaking facility in Sabana del Puerto, Dominican Republic

Rincon Dam Rowing and Canoeing Center
- Centro de Remo y Canotaje Presa de Rincón
- Interactive map of Rincon Dam Rowing and Canoeing Center
- Full name: Centro de Remo y Canotaje Prof. Francisco Santana
- Address: Sabana del Puerto, Monseñor Nouel; Dominican Republic
- Coordinates: 19.0671557°N 70.4219516°W
- Elevation: 119 m (390 ft)
- Operator: Dominican Rowing and Canoeing Federation
- Capacity: 1,600

Construction
- Opened: 2003; 23 years ago
- Renovated: 2023
- Cost: RD$ 44.000 millions (US$1.06 millions)

The Rincon Dam Rowing and Canoeing Center Centro de Remo y Canotaje Presa de Rincón, is a rowing, canoeing and kayaking facility located in Sabana del Puerto, Monseñor Nouel, Dominican Republic at the Jima River waters on the Rincon Dam lake.

The complex was built for the 2003 Pan American Games, relocated to this place per World Rowing request in March 2003. It is equipped with a 2,000-meter, six-lane track for rowing competitions and another 1,000-meter, nine-lane track for canoeing. Includes a four-floors line tower, awards area, boat hangars, administrative areas, medical dispensary, stands capacity for 1,600 spectators and a small sports village.

The venue had hosted national and international events and after the request for remodeling in 2010 and new equipments, the facility was renovated in 2023 to host the 2023 Central American and Caribbean Games, because the Dominican Republic hosted seven sports as a sub-venue for Canoeing and Kayaking. The renovations included the access road being repaired and the construction of a heliport.

The venue received the name of Francisco Santana in memoriam of the founder and former president of the National Federation of Rowing and Canoeing.

== Events hosted ==
- 2003 Pan American Games
- 2023 Central American and Caribbean Games
- 2026 Central American and Caribbean Games
