= Jima River =

Jima River Río Jima

Location
- Country: Dominican Republic
- Provinces: Monseñor Nouel, La Vega
- Cities: Jima Abajo, Sabana del Puerto

Physical characteristics
- Source: Las Neblinas
  - location: Cabirma Clara, Bonao, Monseñor Nouel, Dominican Republic
  - coordinates: 18°59′13″N 70°29′40″W
  - elevation: 900 m (3,000 ft)
- Mouth: Camú River
  - location: Jima Abajo, La Vega, Dominican Republic
  - coordinates: 19°10′10″N 70°22′55″W
  - elevation: 0 m (0 ft)
- Length: 33.73 km (20.96 mi)

Basin features
- Tributaries
  - left: Jatubey River, Jayaco River
  - right: None

The Jima River (Spanish: Río Jima) is a 33.73 km (20.96 mi) long river in central Dominican Republic. The Rincón Reservoir (Spanish: Presa de Rincón) lies along the river. The river originates in Las Neblinas, Bonao, Monseñor Nouel Province and reaches its mouth at the Camú River in Jima Abajo, La Vega Province.

The Rincon Dam, a hydroelectric, municipal water and supply water for irrigation facility, was built along its path and opened in 1978.
