= Nouel =

Nouel is a French surname, it may refer to:

- Adolfo Alejandro Nouel (1862–1937), archbishop, educator and politician
- Maimón, Monseñor Nouel, town in the Monseñor Nouel province of the Dominican Republic
- Monseñor Nouel Province, province of the Dominican Republic
