= Jayaco River =

Jayaco River Río Jayaco
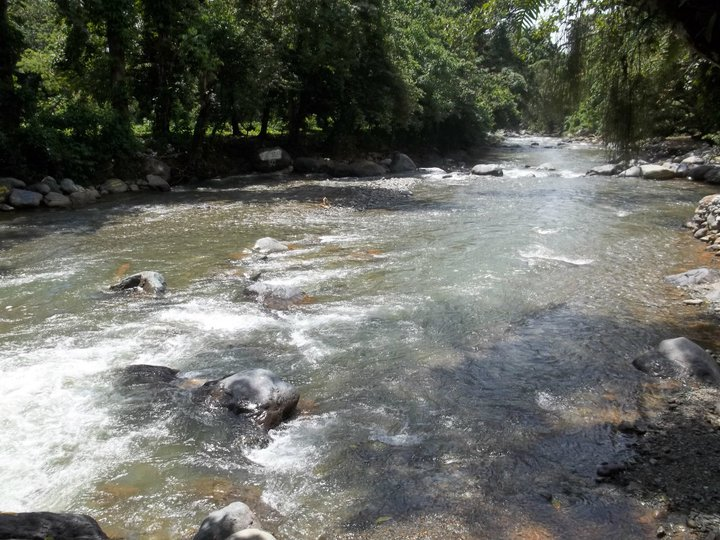
- Jayaco River in Fula, Bonao, D.R.

- Location of mouth

Location
- Country: Dominican Republic
- Provinces: Monseñor Nouel
- City: Sabana del Puerto

Physical characteristics
- Source: Cordillera Central
  - location: Hoyo Redonda, Bonao, Monseñor Nouel, Dominican Republic
  - coordinates: 19°6′5″N 70°31′14″W
  - elevation: 700 m (2,300 ft)
- Mouth: Rincón Reservoir (Jima River)
  - location: Sabana del Puerto, Bonao, Monseñor Nouel, Dominican Republic
  - coordinates: 19°3′32″N 70°25′18″W
  - elevation: 0 m (0 ft)
- Length: 14.58 km (9.06 mi)

Basin features
- Tributaries
  - left: None
  - right: None

Jayaco River (Spanish: Río Jayaco) is a 14.58 km (9.06 mi) long river in the Dominican Republic province of Monseñor Nouel. A part of the Yuna River watershed, the river originates in Hoyo Redonda within the Cordillera Central mountain range. The river flows east from its source and reaches its mouth at the Rincón Reservoir (Spanish: Presa de Rincón), a part of the Jima River.
