= Maimón =

- Interactive map of Maimón
- Location within the Dominican Republic
- Coordinates: 18°54′42″N 70°16′34″W
- Country: Dominican Republic
- Province: Monseñor Nouel

Area
  - Total: 90.07 km^{2} (34.78 sq mi)

Population (2022)
  - Total: 23,885
  - Density: 265.2/km^{2} (686.8/sq mi)
- Distance to – Bonao: 24 km
- Municipal Districts: 0

Maimón is a town and municipality in the Monseñor Nouel Province of the Dominican Republic. Maimón is situated between the Maimón, La Leonora, Yuna and Zinc rivers, formed by a little valley and mountains in his sides. The colonies that were established in Bonao needed to encounter an easy lane to get to Concepción de la Vega, where was settled the general authorities at that time, the first Bonao was established in a little town that today is known as Sonador.

== Notable people ==
- Juan Minaya, baseball player
- Teoscar Hernandez, baseball player
