= Rincon Dam =

- Location within the Dominican Republic
- Official name: Presa de Rincón
- Country: Dominican Republic
- Location: Rincón, Jima Abajo, La Vega
- Coordinates: 19.1037022°N 70.4097992°W
- Purpose: Power, municipal water, irrigation
- Status: Operational
- Opening date: 1978; 48 years ago
- Owner: Dominican Hydroelectric Generation Company

Dam and spillways
- Type of dam: Arch–gravity
- Impounds: Jima River
- Height: 54 m (177 ft)
- Dam volume: 75,500,000 m^{3} (98,800,000 cu yd)
- Spillway capacity: 500 m^{3}/s (18,000 cu ft/s)

Reservoir
- Normal elevation: 118 m (387 ft)

Rincón Hydroelectric Station
- Operator: Dominican Hydroelectric Generation Company
- Turbines: 1 x 10.1 MW Francis-type
- Installed capacity: 10.1 MW

The Rincón Dam is an Arch–gravity dam on the Jima River near Jima Abajo in La Vega Province of the Dominican Republic. It is 54 m (177 ft) tall and the purpose of the dam is to produce hydroelectric power, municipal water and supply water for irrigation. The dam's power station is located downstream and contains a 10.1 MW Francis turbine-generator. The dam was completed in 1978.

== See also ==
- List of dams and reservoirs in Dominican Republic
