= Canoeing at the 2023 Pan American Games – Qualification =

The following is about the qualification system and qualified countries for the Canoeing at the 2023 Pan American Games competition to be held in Santiago, Chile. The canoeing competitions will be held in Los Andes (slalom) and San Pedro de la Paz (sprint).

== Qualification system ==
A total of 176 canoe and kayak athletes will qualify to compete. 126 will qualify in sprint (63 per gender) + four winners from the 2021 Junior Pan American Games and 46 in canoe slalom (23 per gender). The host nation (Chile) is guaranteed a boat in each event in the sprint discipline and in slalom (except the extreme events), however it must compete in the respective qualification tournaments.

== Qualification timeline ==
Events	Date	Venue
2021 Junior Pan American Games	November 25–27	(Colombia) Cali
2022 Pan American Canoe Sprint Championships	August 10–12	(Canada) Dartmouth
2023 Pan American Canoe Slalom Championships	April 28–30	(Brazil) Tres Coroas
2023 COPAC U-23 Championships	April 26–30	(Chile) Santiago
2023 Central American and Caribbean Games	June 24–26	(Dominican Republic) Santo Domingo

== Qualification summary ==
NOC	Slalom						Sprint				Total
NOC	Men			Women			Men		Women		Athletes
NOC	C1	K1	EK1	C1	K1	EK1	Canoe	Kayak	Canoe	Kayak	Athletes
Argentina	1	1	1	1	1	1	2	6	2	6	22
Belize								1			1
Brazil	1	1	1	1	1	1	3	2	1	1	13
Canada	1			1	1		3	6	3	6	21
Chile	1	1	1	1	1	1	1	5	3	4	19
Colombia							3		1	1	5
Cuba							3	4	3	4	14
Dominican Republic							1				1
Ecuador									1		1
Jamaica		1									1
Mexico			1		1		2	5	2	5	16
Paraguay	1			1							2
Peru	1	1			1		1			2	6
Puerto Rico								3			3
Trinidad and Tobago								2			2
United States	1		1			1	2	6	3	5	19
Uruguay								3			3
Venezuela	1	1		1		1	1		1		6
Total: 18 NOCs	9	9	5	9	9	5	22	43	22	43	174

== Slalom ==
A total of 36 canoe slalom athletes (18 per gender) will qualify, along with 10 in extreme canoe slalom (five per gender). All qualification will be done at the 2023 Pan American Canoe Slalom Championships. A nation can qualify a maximum of one athlete per event, meaning a nation can enter a maximum of six athletes (three men and three women). All athletes qualified in canoe slalom can contest the extreme event. A wild card quota is available for an each gender in a canoe slalom event, only if they have competed at the 2023 Pan American Championships.

=== Qualification table ===
Event	C1 Men	K1 Men	C1 Women	K1 Women	Extreme K1 Men	Extreme K1 Women
2023 Pan American Canoe Slalom Championships	Chile; Argentina; Canada; United States; Brazil; Paraguay; Peru; Venezuela; TBD	Chile; Brazil; Argentina; Peru; Venezuela; Jamaica; TBD; TBD; TBD	Chile; Brazil; Canada; Paraguay; Argentina; Venezuela; TBD; TBD; TBD	Chile; Brazil; Canada; Argentina; Mexico; Peru; TBD; TBD; TBD	Brazil; United States; Mexico; Chile; Argentina	United States; Chile; Argentina; Brazil; Venezuela
Total 10 NOC's	9	9	9	9	5	5

== Sprint ==
The top six boats in the kayak events and top seven in the canoe events at the 2022 Pan American Championships qualify for the games. An athlete can qualify in only one boat, and if they compete in multiple events at the qualifier, their results are not counted in the smaller boat(s). The larger boats are awarded first, followed by the smaller ones, with all countries qualifying in the larger boats required to compete in any smaller boat(s) at the games. A total of 43 kayak and 22 canoe athletes will qualify per gender. All quotas were not awarded, and two additional qualification events, the COPAC U-23 Championships and the Central American and Caribbean Games were added.

=== Men's canoe ===
Event	Quotas	Athlete total	Qualified
Cali 2021	1	1	Jose Pelier (CUB)
Pan American Championships	3	9	Brazil; Canada; Colombia
Pan American Championships	2	8	Argentina; Cuba; Mexico; United States
Pan American Championships	1	2	Chile; Peru
U23 COPAC Championships	1	1	Venezuela
Central American and Caribbean Games	1	1	Dominican Republic
TOTAL		22	

=== Men's kayak ===
Event	Quotas	Athlete total	Qualified
Cali 2021	1	1	Valentin Rossi (ARG)
Pan American Championships	6	12	Canada; United States
Pan American Championships	5	15	Argentina; Mexico; Chile
Pan American Championships	4	4	Cuba
Pan American Championships	3	6	Puerto Rico; Uruguay
Pan American Championships	2	4	Brazil; Trinidad and Tobago
Pan American Championships	1	1	Belize
TOTAL		43	

=== Women's canoe ===
Event	Quotas	Athlete total	Qualified
Cali 2021	1	1	Katherin Nuevo (CUB)
Pan American Championships	3	9	Canada; Chile; Cuba
Pan American Championships	2	6	Argentina; Cuba; Mexico
Pan American Championships	1	3	Brazil; Colombia; Ecuador
U23 COPAC Championships	1	2	Venezuela; TBD
Central American and Caribbean Games	1	1	
TOTAL		22	

=== Women's kayak ===
Event	Quotas	Athlete total	Qualified
Cali 2021	1	1	Isabel Aburto (MEX)
Pan American Championships	6	12	Argentina; Canada
Pan American Championships	5	5	United States
Pan American Championships	4	12	Chile; Cuba; Mexico
Pan American Championships	2	2	Peru
Pan American Championships	1	2	Brazil; Colombia
U23 COPAC Championships K2	2	4	Colombia; Venezuela
U23 COPAC Championships K1	1	2	Ecuador; Peru
Central American and Caribbean Games K2	2	2	Dominican Republic
Central American and Caribbean Games K1	1	1	Guatemala
TOTAL		43	

== See also ==
- Canoeing at the 2024 Summer Olympics – Qualification
