= Aniana Vargas =

Dominican revolutionary and environmental activist (1930–2002)

Aniana Ondina Vargas Jáquez (13 March 1930 – 16 December 2002) was a Dominican democracy and environmental activist. After a period in exile in the United States during the regime of Rafael Trujillo, Vargas returned to the Dominican Republic following his assassination in 1961 where, following the 1963 coup d'état that ousted Trujillo's democratically elected successor, Juan Bosch, she became one of the most prominent female members of the constitutionalist June 14th Revolutionary Movement during the subsequent civil war in 1965. Later in her life, Vargas became known as an environmental activist and land defender, earning the nickname La Madre de las Aguas ("the mother of the waters") due to her work on the preservation of the Yuma River.

== Early life and exile ==
Vargas was born in Bonao, Monseñor Nouel, Dominican Republic, to Marcelino Antonio Vargas García and Eugenia Elicia Jáquez Abreu. By 1956, she was a prominent anti-Trujillo activist in Bonao, though in 1959, she fled the country following threats and harassments she and her family experienced from Trujillo's security forces, including the Servicio de Inteligenica Militar. Vargas settled in New York City in the United States, where she continued to support Manolo Tavárez Justo, a revolutionary who had been married to Minerva Mirabal Reyes, one of the Mirabal sisters who were murdered at Trujillo's orders in 1960.

== Anti-triumvirate activism and civil war ==
Trujillo was assassinated in May 1961; while he had been succeeded by his son Ramfis Trujillo, by November the Trujillo family were pressured into exile, leaving for France, and Vargas returned to the Dominican Republic that same year. Vargas was a supporter of Juan Bosch, who became the country's first democratically elected president in February 1963. By November, a coup d'état by the Dominican Army had ousted Bosch and replaced him with a military junta under a triumvirate model.

Following the coup, Justo reformed his anti-Trujillo group into the June 14th Revolutionary Movement; from 1963 until 1964, Vargas took part in resistance activities against the triumvirate, operating underground to avoid persecution. On 24 April 1965, Vargas participated in the April Revolution, which saw a second coup d'état which ousted the militarily installed president, Donald Reid Cabral, triggering the Dominican Civil War.

During the war, which lasted from April to September 1965, Vargas initially was assigned to a command on Calle Juan de Morfa in Santo Domingo, which saw significant fighting between the pro-military loyalist and the constitutionalist factions. Vargas gained recognition as a prominent female member of the constitutionalist movement, and, alongside Roberto Duvergé, established the Academia 24 de Abril, a combatant training facility in Eugenio María de Hostos Park. Vargas subsequently commanded revolutionary activities in the Padres Las Casas, Azula, and in the rural communities of Puerto Plata.

In June 1965, Vargas was among six female resistance members who were sent to China to receive further training. She subsequently experienced the Cultural Revolution during her time in the country. While Vargas was abroad, the loyalists won the civil war, with a ceasefire and new elections being agreed. She returned to the Dominican Republic in 1968.

== Subsequent environmental activism ==
During the 1980s, Vargas was the leader of the Manolo Tavárez Justo Foundation and was a vocal critic of the economic stabilisation programme agreed by the International Monetary Fund and the government of Salvador Jorge Blanco, which saw mandated price increases in 1984.

By the end of the decade, Vargas had re-emerged as an environmental activist and land defender in her home province of Monseñor Nouel. She led a successful campaign against Falconbridge Dominicana, a ferronickel mining company that sought to operate in Bonao. In the 1990s, Vargas re-emerged as an environmental activist and land defender in her home province of Monseñor Nouel. She led a successful campaign against Falconbridge Dominicana, a ferronickel mining company that sought to operate in Bonao. Around this time, she also became actively involved in the peasant movement through the Federation of Farmers Towards Progress (Spanish: Federación de Campesinos Hacia el Progreso, FCHP), an organization founded by farmers from the Alto Yuna region under the leadership of Esteban Polanco Colón. Her participation in the federation was highly valued, especially for her commitment to rural and environmental causes, although she eventually stepped away from the organization.

Vargas became a regular contributor for El Nacional, where she wrote columns primarily focused on issues facing the environment, as well as farmers and rural communities.

== Death and legacy ==
Vargas died on 16 December 2002 in Bonao, of natural causes at the age of 72. She was later buried in the town.

The Dominican government named the Aniana Vargas National Park after her. Located primarily in her home province, it includes within it the Hatillo Dam, the largest freshwater reservoir in the Caribbean, and is also a noted location of prehistoric cave paintings. The Yuna River, which Vargas spent the last decades of her life defending, runs through the park.

A street named after Vargas exists in her hometown of Bonao.

A documentary about Vargas, entitled Aniana Vargas: la mariposa entre hortensias ("Aniana Vargas: The Butterfly between Hydrangeas) and directed by Max Garcia, premiered in 2012.
