= Canoeing at the 2023 Central American and Caribbean Games =

- Venue: Centro de Remo y Canotaje Presa de Rincón
- Location: (Dominican Republic) Sabana del Puerto, Monseñor Nouel
- Dates: 24 June – 26 June

The canoeing competition at the 2023 Central American and Caribbean Games was held in Sabana del Puerto, Monseñor Nouel, Dominican Republic at the Centro de Remo y Canotaje Presa de Rincón, from 24 June to 26 June.

== Medal table ==
* Host nation (El Salvador)

Rank	Nation	Gold	Silver	Bronze	Total
1	Cuba (CUB)	4	4	0	8
2	Mexico (MEX)	3	2	2	7
3	Colombia (COL)	1	1	2	4
4	Dominican Republic (DOM)	1	1	1	3
5	Venezuela (VEN)	0	1	4	5
Totals (5 entries)		9	9	9	27

== Medal summary ==
=== Men's events ===
Event	Gold	Silver	Bronze
C-1 1000 m	José Pelier (CUB)	Sergio Díaz (COL)	Edwar Paredes (VEN)
C-2 500 m	Cuba (CUB); Jose Pelier; Tabiany Dieguez	Mexico (MEX); Gustavo Eslava; Rigoberto Camilo	Venezuela (VEN); Luis Guerra; Edwar Paredes
K-1 200 m	Jose Eguia (MEX)	Alexander Concepción (DOM)	Ray Acuña (VEN)
K-1 1000 m	Leocadio Pinto (COL)	Robert Benítez (CUB)	Cristian Guerrero (DOM)
K-2 500 m	Cuba (CUB); Robert Benítez; Yan Same	Venezuela (VEN); Cristian Canache; Ray Acuña	Mexico (MEX); José Eguia; Alberto Briones
K-4 500 m	Dominican Republic (DOM); Rafael Féliz; Cristian Guerrero; Alexander Concepción; Juan Plasencia	Cuba (CUB); Robert Benítez; Yan Same; Reyler Paterson; Julio Hidalgo	Mexico (MEX); José Eguia; Carlos Navarro Morales; Alberto Briones; Juan Fernando Rodríguez

=== Women's events ===
Event	Gold	Silver	Bronze
K-1 200 m	Brenda Gutiérrez (MEX)	Yurieni Guerra (CUB)	Yocelin Canache (VEN)
K-1 500 m	Beatriz Briones (MEX)	Yurieni Guerra (CUB)	Mónica Hincapié (COL)
K-2 500 m	Cuba (CUB); Daylen Rodríguez; Yurieni Guerra	Mexico (MEX); Karina Alanís; Maricela Montemayor	Colombia (COL); Tatiana Muñoz; Diexe Molina
