= Tireo =

- Location within the Dominican Republic
- Coordinates: 18°55′48″N 70°40′48″W
- Country: Dominican Republic
- Province: La Vega

Population (2008)
  - Total: 4,023

Tireo is a town in the La Vega province of the Dominican Republic.

== Sources ==
- – World-Gazetteer.com
