= Éléonore Desmier d'Olbreuse =

Éléonore Desmier
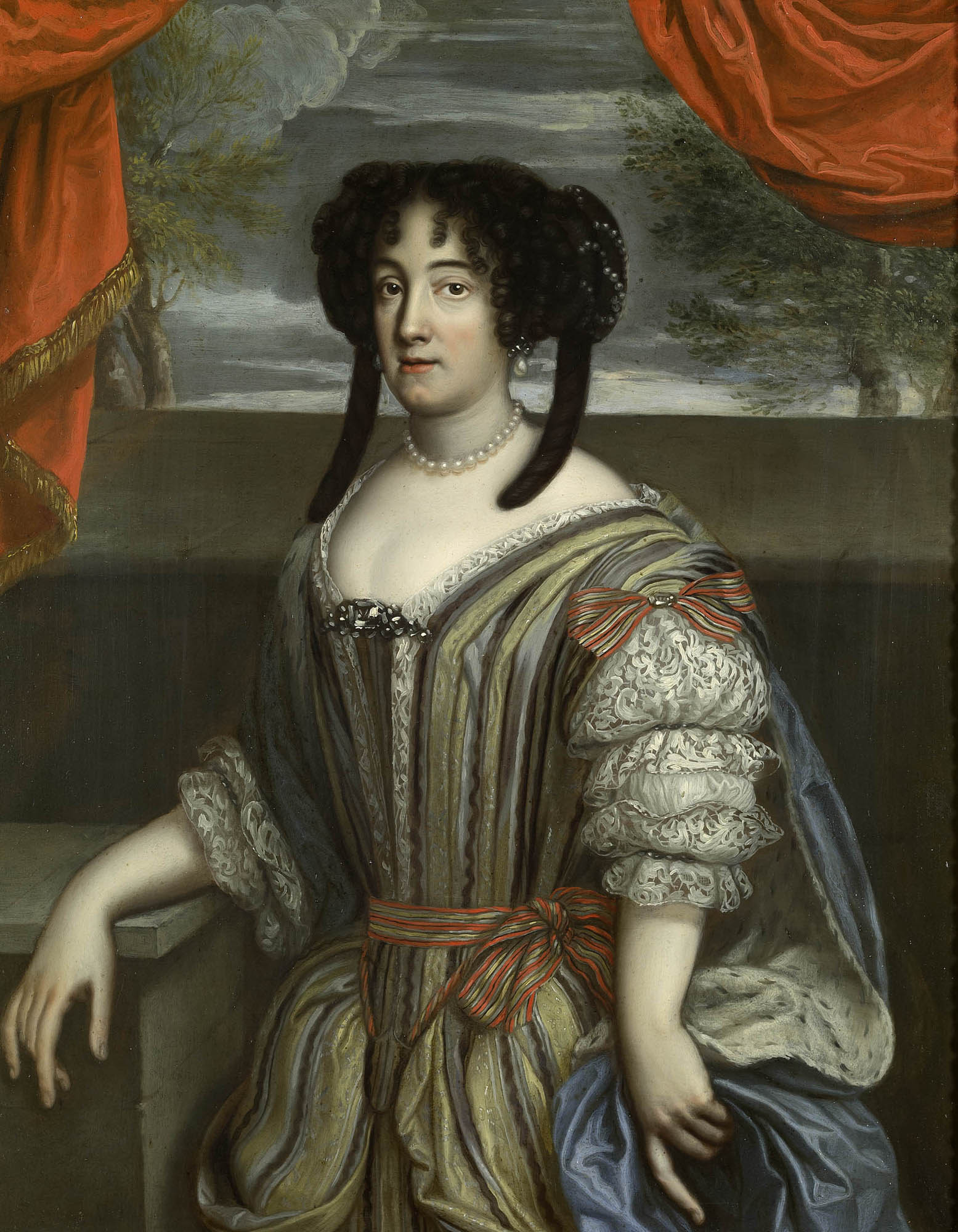
- Portrait, c. 1658. Attributed to German School, Brunswick. Royal Collection, Great Britain.

Duchess consort of Brunswick-Lüneburg
- Tenure: 24 April 1676 – 28 August 1705

Duchess consort of Saxe-Lauenburg
- Tenure: 30 September 1689 – 28 August 1705
- Born: January 1639 probably the Château d'Olbreuse, now in Deux-Sèvres, France
- Died: 5 February 1722 (aged 83); Celle Castle, Celle, Germany
- Burial: Stadtkirche, Celle, Germany
- Spouse: George William, Duke of Brunswick-Lüneburg (m. 1665; died 1705)
- Issue: Sophia Dorothea, Electoral Princess of Hanover
- House: Olbreuse (by birth); Hanover (by marriage)
- Father: Alexandre Desmier, seigneur d'Olbreuse
- Mother: Jacquette Poussard du Bas-Vandré

Éléonore Desmier d'Olbreuse (3, 7 or 9 January 1639 – 5 February 1722), was a French noblewoman, who became first the mistress and later wife of George William of Brunswick, Duke of Lauenburg and Prince of Celle. She was the mother of Sophia Dorothea of Celle, who was the wife of George I of Great Britain. Thus she was the maternal grandmother of George II.

== Life ==
Éléonore Desmier d'Olbreuse was probably born at the Castle of Olbreuse in what is now Deux-Sèvres near Niort, Poitou, France, into a Huguenot family of lesser French nobility. Her parents were Alexandre Desmier, seigneur d'Olbreuse, and his wife, Jacquette Poussard du Bas-Vandré.

In 1661 she went to the royal court in Paris as a lady-in-waiting in the service of Marie de La Tour d'Auvergne, Duchess of Thouars, whose son Henri Charles de La Trémoille had married Landgravine Emilie of Hesse-Cassel, daughter of William V, Landgrave of Hesse-Kassel in 1648. In winter 1664 Emilie visited her relatives in Kassel, where she was accompanied by Éléonore, whose remarkable beauty attracted many suitors. It was in the court of Kassel that Éléonore met George William of Brunswick, Prince of Calenberg, who immediately fell in love with her, and they began a love affair.

At first, Éléonore could only aspire to being a mere mistress, but George William was determined to marry her, despite the previous arrangement made by him and his other brothers that none of them could marry (except Ernest Augustus) in order to avoid further divisions on their domains. Finally, in 1665 George William abdicated all his rights over the Principality of Calenberg (giving it to his brother John Frederick) and to his recently inherited Principality of Lüneburg (giving it to his brother Ernest Augustus) and entered into a secret morganatic marriage with Éléonore, who received the title of "Lady of Harburg" (Frau von Harburg); however, George William managed to keep the Principality of Celle as his personal domain during his lifetime; in addition a ducal order dated 15 November 1665 guaranteed a dower for Éléonore in case George William died. One year later, on 15 September 1666, Éléonore gave birth a daughter, Sophia Dorothea.

Éléonore and George William enjoyed an almost bourgeois and very happy marriage. Since she had no official status in the first years of her marriage, she was able to personally raise her daughter, who was very similar to her, more than other upper-class women of her time. Being raised in the Huguenot faith, Éléonore founded a reformed church (Reformierte Kirche) in Celle and maintained it with her own resources. She also managed to arrange good marriages to her sisters: the older, Angélique (died 5 October 1688) married Count Henry V Reuss of Untergreiz (1645-1698) in 1678, while the younger, Marie, became the wife of Olivier de Beaulieu-Marconnay (1660-1751), also from a Huguenot noble family, who held high-ranking court office in Hanover.

Despite the fact that George William not only secured a dower for Éléonore but also bequeathed all of his private fortune to her and undertook to take care of her impoverished relatives, she wanted to be recognized as a Duchess of Brunswick with full rights. By Imperial order dated 22 July 1674 and in recognition to the military assistance given to Emperor Leopold I, her husband obtained for Éléonore and their daughter the higher title of "Countess of Harburg and Wilhelmsburg" (Gräfin von Harburg und Wilhelmsburg) with the allodial rights over the domains.

By that time, it had become quite clear that among the four brothers (George William and three others), only the youngest, Ernest Augustus, had produced any heirs male, and that the entire duchy of Lüneburg was likely to be united under Ernest Augustus's eldest son George Louis. George William therefore wanted George Louis to marry his daughter Sophia Dorothea, whose marriage prospects were otherwise not bright, given the circumstances of her birth. To George William's annoyance, George Louis and his parents refused the proposal on the grounds of precisely the birth status of the intended bride.

After the rejection of his daughter, George William decided to improve definitively the status of Éléonore and Sophia Dorothea: by contract signed on 22 August 1675 and in open violation of his previous promise, George William declared that his marriage to Éléonore was not morganatic but valid to both church and state, with a second wedding ceremony being held at Celle on 2 April 1676. George William's younger brother Ernst August and specially his wife Sophia of the Palatinate demonstratively stayed away from this second wedding. Twenty-two days later, on 24 April, the second marriage was made public and Éléonore officially addressed as Duchess of Brunswick and their daughter declared legitimate.

This development greatly alarmed his relatives, as it threatened to hinder the contemplated union of the Lüneburg territories. Indeed, if George William had had a son, a serious succession crisis could have arisen. No son however was born, as Éléonore’s next two pregnancies, in 1671 and August 1676, produced only short-lived daughters. Once it became clear that George William wouldn't have male heirs, his brothers relented: by family agreement signed on 13 July 1680, Éléonore was finally recognized by her husband's family as Duchess of Brunswick and, most importantly, Sophia Dorothea was declared Princess of Brunswick-Lüneburg-Celle with all appertaining rights of birth. Also, George Louis' parents finally agreed to the proposed marriage with Sophia Dorothea as a way of avoiding uncertainty and inheritance disputes. The wedding took place on 21 November 1682 but since the beginning the union was a complete failure: the feelings of hatred and contempt that Sophia of the Palatinate had over her daughter-in-law were soon shared by her son George Louis, who was oddly formal to his wife. Sophia Dorothea was frequently scolded for her lack of etiquette, and the two had loud and bitter arguments. Nevertheless, they managed to have two children in quick succession: George Augustus (born 30 October 1683 and future King George II of Great Britain) and Sophia Dorothea (born 16 March 1687 and by marriage Queen consort in Prussia and Electress consort of Brandenburg).

Éléonore still experienced first-hand the catastrophic course of her daughter's marriage. When Sophia Dorothea began a relationship with Count Philip Christoph von Königsmarck and threatened with the scandal of an elopement, the Hanoverian court, including not only George Louis's brothers and mother but also Éléonore, urged the lovers to desist, but to no avail. On the morning of 2 July 1694, after a meeting with Sophia Dorothea at the Leineschloss castle, von Königsmark was seized and disappeared, being presumed murdered at the instigation of George Louis, and his body thrown into the Leine river. Sophia Dorothea was placed under house arrest, and her marriage was dissolved on 28 December 1694 under the grounds of desertion. At the request of her former husband and with the consent of her own father, she was forbidden to see her children again and imprisoned for life in the Castle of Ahlden. Devastated by the fate of her daughter, Éléonore tried by all means to obtain her release, without success.

When George William was on his deathbed in 1705, he wanted to see his daughter one last time to reconcile with her, but his prime minister, Baron Andreas Gottlieb von Bernstorff, raised objections and claimed that a meeting would lead to diplomatic complications with Hanover; the ailing duke no longer had the strength to prevail against him.

After the death of her husband, Éléonore received Lüneburg Castle as her widow's seat. Sophia Dorothea unsuccessfully asked her former husband one last time that he should let her leave Ahlden to live with her mother in complete seclusion, but her request was denied.

Éléonore spent the last years of her life caring for her daughter and trying to obtain her release. She even turned to King Louis XIV, who had once driven her and her Huguenot family out of France. The French monarch was not averse to accepting her and her daughter, but Eléonore did not want to meet the condition of converting to Catholicism.

Éléonore died on 5 February 1722, nearly blind, in Celle Castle, Celle. She mentioned 342 persons in her will. She was buried in the Fürstengruft at the Stadtkirche St. Marien (town church of St. Mary) in Celle.

== Ancestry ==
Ancestors of Éléonore Desmier d'Olbreuse

16. François Desmier, seigneur d'Olbreuse
8. Louis Desmier, seigneur d'Olbreuse
17. Hélène Dorin
4. Alexandre Desmier, seigneur d'Olbreuse
18. Jacques de Mathefelon, seigneur d'Orfeuille
9. Jeanne de Mathefelon
19. Luce du Courret
2. Alexandre Desmier, seigneur d'Olbreuse
20. Pierre Baudoin
10. Mathieu Baudoin, seigneur du Peux
21. Madeleine Baudu
5. Marie Baudoin
22. Guillaume Tarquois, seigneur de Fontaines
11. Jacquette Tarquois
23. Guillemette de Biron
1. Éléonore Desmier
24. René Poussard, seigneur du Bas-Vandré
12. Jean Poussard, seigneur du Bas-Vandré
25. Jacqueline de Barbezières
6. Joachim Poussard, seigneur du Bas-Vandré
26. Simon de La Jaille, seigneur de La Tour-Saint-Gelin
13. Anne de La Jaille
27. Simone de Mauléon
3. Jacquette Poussard
28. Guillaume Gaillard, seigneur de Saint-Dizant
14. Lancelot Gaillard, seigneur de Saint-Dizant
29. Léonie de Pompadour
7. Suzanne Gaillard
30. Charles de L'Isle, seigneur de Saint-Mauris
15. Jacquette de L'Isle
31. Marie de Beaumont

== Bibliography ==
- Andreas Flick: „Der Celler Hof ist ganz verfranzt“. Hugenotten und französische Katholiken am Hof und beim Militär Herzog Georg Wilhelms von Braunschweig-Lüneburg (in German). In: Hugenotten. 72nd year, N° 3, 2008, ISSN 0340-3718, S. 87–120 (PDF; 2,2 MB).
- Horric de Beaucaire, Charles Prosper Maurice (1884). Une mésalliance dans la maison de Brunswick (1665-1725) : Éléonore Desmier d'Olbreuze, duchesse de Zell (in French). Paris: Libr. H. Oudin : Libr. Fischbacher (Société Anonyme). OCLC 1125380017.
- Elisabeth E. Kwan und Anna E. Röhrig: Frauen vom Hof der Welfen. (in German) MatrixMedia, Göttingen 2006, pp. 53–63 and 115–126, ISBN 3-932313-17-8
- Leitner, Thea (1995). Skandal bei Hof Frauenschicksale an europäischen Königshöfen (in German). München. ISBN 978-3-492-12009-8. OCLC 845117877.
- Luise Marelle: Eleonore d’Olbreuse, Herzogin von Braunschweig-Lüneburg-Celle. Die Großmutter Europas (in German). Hoffmann und Campe, Hamburg 1936.
- Pierre-Henri Mitard: Éléonore Desmier d’Olbreuse. ‘La Grand’Mère de l’Europe‘ (1639–1722) In: Bulletin de la Société Historique et Scientifique des Deux-Sèvres. Deuxième série (in French). vol. 23, N° 1. Niort, 1990, pp. 35–38. ISSN 0751-5294
- Neigebaur, Johann Ferdinand (1859). Eleonore d'Olbreuse, die Stammmutter der Königshäuser von England, Hannover und Preußen (in German). Universitätsbibliothek Braunschweig. doi:10.24355/dbbs.084-201002081353-0.
- Dorothea Nolde: Eléonore Desmier d’Olbreuse (1639–1722) am Celler Hof als diplomatische, religiöse und kulturelle Mittlerin (in German). In: Dorothea Nolde, Claudia Opitz (ed.): Grenzüberschreitende Familienbeziehungen. Akteure und Medien des Kulturtransfers in der frühen Neuzeit. 1st edition, Böhlau, Köln [u. a.] 2008, ISBN 978-3-412-20100-5, pp. 107–120 (excerpt)
- Michael Sikora: Dynastie und Eigensinn. Herzog Georg Wilhelm von Celle, Eleonore d’Olbreuse und die Spielregeln des Fürstenstandes. In: Heiko Laß (ed.): Hof und Medien im Spannungsfeld von dynastischer Tradition und politischer Innovation zwischen 1648 und 1714 (= Rudolstädter Forschungen zur Residenzkultur, vol. 4). Deutscher Kunstverlag, Munich 2008, pp. 19–30. ISBN 978-3-422-06862-9
- du Vinage, Renate (2010). Ein vortreffliches Frauenzimmer das Schicksal von Eleonore Desmier d'Olbreuse (1639 - 1722), der letzten Herzogin von Braunschweig-Lüneburg-Celle (in German). Berlin. ISBN 978-3-87527-107-2. OCLC 64650329.

German nobility
Preceded by Sophia Dorothea of Schleswig-Holstein-Sonderburg-Glücksburg	Duchess consort of Brunswick-Lüneburg; 1676–1705; Served alongside: 1) Benedicta Henrietta of the Palatinate and 2) Sophia of Hannover	Vacant Title next held by Caroline of Ansbach
Vacant Title last held by Hedwig of the Palatinate-Sulzbach	Duchess consort of Saxe-Lauenburg; 1689–1705	Vacant Title next held by Caroline of Ansbach
