= Villa Sonador =

- Villa de Sonador
- Interactive map of Villa Sonador
- Location within the Dominican Republic
- Coordinates: 18°52′23.5″N 70°21′44.7″W
- Country: Dominican Republic
- Province: Monseñor Nouel

Population (2008)
  - Total: 3 899

Villa de Sonador is a town in the Monseñor Nouel province of the Dominican Republic.

== Sources ==
- – World-Gazetteer.com
