= Río Verde Arriba =

- Location within the Dominican Republic
- Coordinates: 19°19′12″N 70°34′12″W
- Country: Dominican Republic
- Province: La Vega

Population (2008)
  - Total: 33,809
- Climate: Af

Río Verde Arriba is a town in the La Vega province of the Dominican Republic.Río Verde Arriba is the self governing body.

== Sources ==
- – World-Gazetteer.com
