= Adolfo Alejandro Nouel =

Dominican archbishop, educator and interim president

His Excellency, The Most Reverend Monsignor Adolfo Alejandro Nouel
- Metropolitan Archbishop of Santo Domingo, Primate of the Indies; President of the Dominican Republic
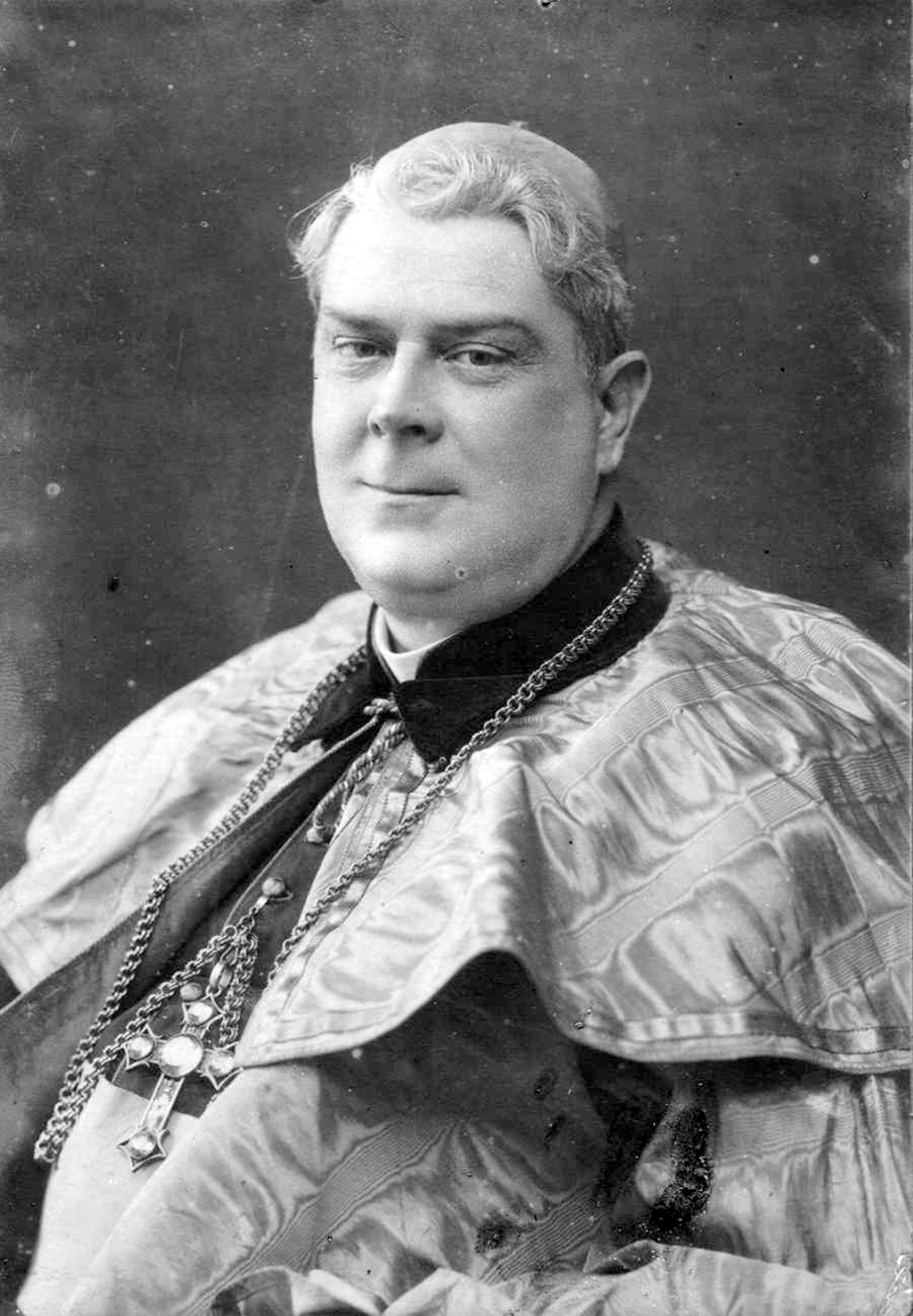
- Archbishop Nouel
- Church: Roman Catholic Church
- Archdiocese: Santo Domingo
- See: Basilica Cathedral of Santa María la Menor
- Appointed: 20 August 1906
- Quashed: 11 October 1935
- Predecessor: Fernando Arturo de Meriño
- Successor: Ricardo Pittini
- Other post: President of the Dominican Republic (1912–1913)

Orders
- Ordination: 19 December 1885 by Fernando Arturo de Meriño
- Consecration: 16 October 1904 by Rafael Merry del Val

Personal details
- Born: Adolfo Alejandro Nouel y Bobadilla; December 12, 1862 Santo Domingo, Dominican Republic
- Died: June 25, 1937 (aged 74) Ciudad Trujillo, District of Santo Domingo, Dominican Republic
- Denomination: Catholic Church
- Residence: Santo Domingo
- Parents: Carlos Rafael Nouel y Pierret (father), Clemencia Antonia Bobadilla y Desmier D'Olbreuse (mother)
- Motto: Iustitia et Pax (Latin for 'Justice and Peace')
- Coat of arms: Adolfo Alejandro Nouel's coat of arms

Adolfo Alejandro Nouel y Bobadilla (12 December 1862, Santo Domingo – 26 June 1937) was an archbishop, educator and interim president of the Dominican Republic.

== Early life and education ==
Nouel was born to Carlos Rafael Nouel y Pierret, a Dominican diplomat, law teacher, journalist, and businessman of French descent, and Clemencia Antonia Bobadilla y Desmier D'Olbreuse (daughter of President Tomás Bobadilla y Briones, of full Spanish descent and the first ruler of the Dominican Republic, with his wife of French noble origin María Virginia Desmier D'Olbreuse y Allard, from the Desmier of Olbreuse dynasty) in Santo Domingo. Nouel was 3/4 French and 1/4 Spanish. His great-grandfather, Barthelemy Pierret Grinet, was a French gunnery sergeant who arrived to the island on 29 January 1802 in the fleet commanded by General Leclerc, Napoleon's brother-in-law.

Ancestry of Monsignor Nouel

16. Blaise Nouel Marien
8. François-Adolphe Nouel Naulin
17. Marie Naulin
4. Juan Bautista Adolfo Nouel y Gobert (b. 1806, d. 1859)
18. Pierre Gobert
9. Marie-Sophie Gobert Tessier
19. Marie-Louise Tessier
2. Carlos Rafael Nouel y Pierret (b. 1833, m. 1854, d. 1905)
20. Robert Pierret
10. Barthelemy Pierret Grienet
21. Marie-Louise Grienet
5. Juana Rosa Margarita Pierret y Grandier (b. 1800)
22. Jérôme Grandier Jerlin
11. María Margarita Grandier Champenoise
23. Pétronille Chapenoise
1. Adolfo Alejandro Nouel y Bobadilla (b. 1862, d. 1937)
24. Tomás Bobadilla y Mueses (m. 1779, d. 1872)
12. Vicente Bobadilla y Amaral (d. 1832)
25. Mauricia Francisca Amaral y Jiménez
6. Tomás Bobadilla y Briones (b. 1785, m. 1832, d. 1871)
26. Mateo Briones y Sánchez
13. Gregoria Justina Briones y Pérez
27. Dominga Pérez y Pérez
3. Clemencia Antonia Bobadilla y Desmier D'Olbreuse (b. 1835, m. 1854, d. 1876)
28. Charles Desmier D'Olbreuse
14. Bernard Desmier D'Olbreuse
29. Catherine Rasteau des Arnaulds
7. María Virginia Desmier D'Olbreuse y Allard (m. 1832,d. 1879)
15. Marie-Madeleine Allard

He began his studies in El Colegio El Estudio, of Santo Domingo, and afterward he studied at the Seminary of the Dominican Capital. Before going to study abroad, he was a student of Archbishop Fernando Arturo de Meriño. He went to Italy where he studied in the Colegio Latin Pio for ten years. He excelled in this school as one of the brightest students. In 1883 he received a doctorate in philosophy and bachelor's degree in theology and canon law from the Gregorian University. In 1885, accompanied by Monsignor Meriño, he returned to Santo Domingo and received the sacred order of priesthood in the Cathedral of Santo Domingo.

== Priesthood ==
In 1888 he became the parish priest of San Juan. In 1890, he became parish priest of the Cathedral of Santo Domingo and vice-chancellor of the Conciliar Seminary of Santo Tomas de Aquino. In this seminary he taught Philosophy, Latin and Theology. Later he became parish priest of Santa Barbara, Santa Cruz in el Seibo, San Juan de la Maguana and finally of the parish in La Vega. In this city he initiated the building of a church the Town designated as "adopted son".

In 1903, he was elected deputy of the Province of La Vega. He traveled to Rome, in this year and was designated by Cardinal Merry de Val as Archbishop of Metymma and successor of Monsignor Merino whom he succeeded in the Archdiocese of Santo Domingo after his death on August 20, 1906.

== Politics ==
He was inaugurated as provisional president of the Dominican Republic through a decree of the National Congress on November 30, 1912. His rise to office was due to the ongoing Civil War and the imperative that the presidential office be occupied by a neutral person, who inspired trust and respect, and could offer a stable peace. He resigned before the National Assembly, on April 13, 1913, after considering that he had achieved his purpose to bring peace to the country.

The invasion of the Dominican Republic by American troops, surprised him while he was in Rome where he had traveled for health reasons. He returned to Santo Domingo in 1920 and wrote a letter to the American Ambassador protesting the American intervention.

== Writing ==
His literary work has not been published. Typed copies are kept by the Universidad Autonoma de Santo Domingo. He was in charge of editing the work of his father Historia Eclesiastica de la Arquidiocesis de Santo Domingo.

He was in the middle of revising several documents from el Archivo de Indias when he died in 1937.

== Tributes ==
Monseñor Nouel Province was named for Adolfo Nouel.

Catholic Church titles
Preceded by Fernando Arturo de Meriño	Archbishop of Santo Domingo; 1906–1935	Succeeded by Ricardo Paolo Pittini
Political offices
Preceded by Eladio Victoria	President of the Dominican Republic; 1912–1913	Succeeded by José Bordas Valdez
Academic offices
New institution	Chairman of the Dominican Academy of History; 1927–1937	Succeeded by Cayetano Armando Rodríguez
