= Cutupú =

Rio Verde Arriba Cutupú
- Town
- Río Verde
- Nickname: Villa Cutupú
- Motto: 15,000
- Location within the Dominican Republic
- Coordinates: 19°19′0″N 70°32′0″W
- Country: Dominican Republic
- Province: La Vega

Cutupú is a small town in the northern part of La Vega Province in the Dominican Republic. It is 11 kilometres (6.8 mi) to the north of La Vega city.
