= Piedra Blanca =

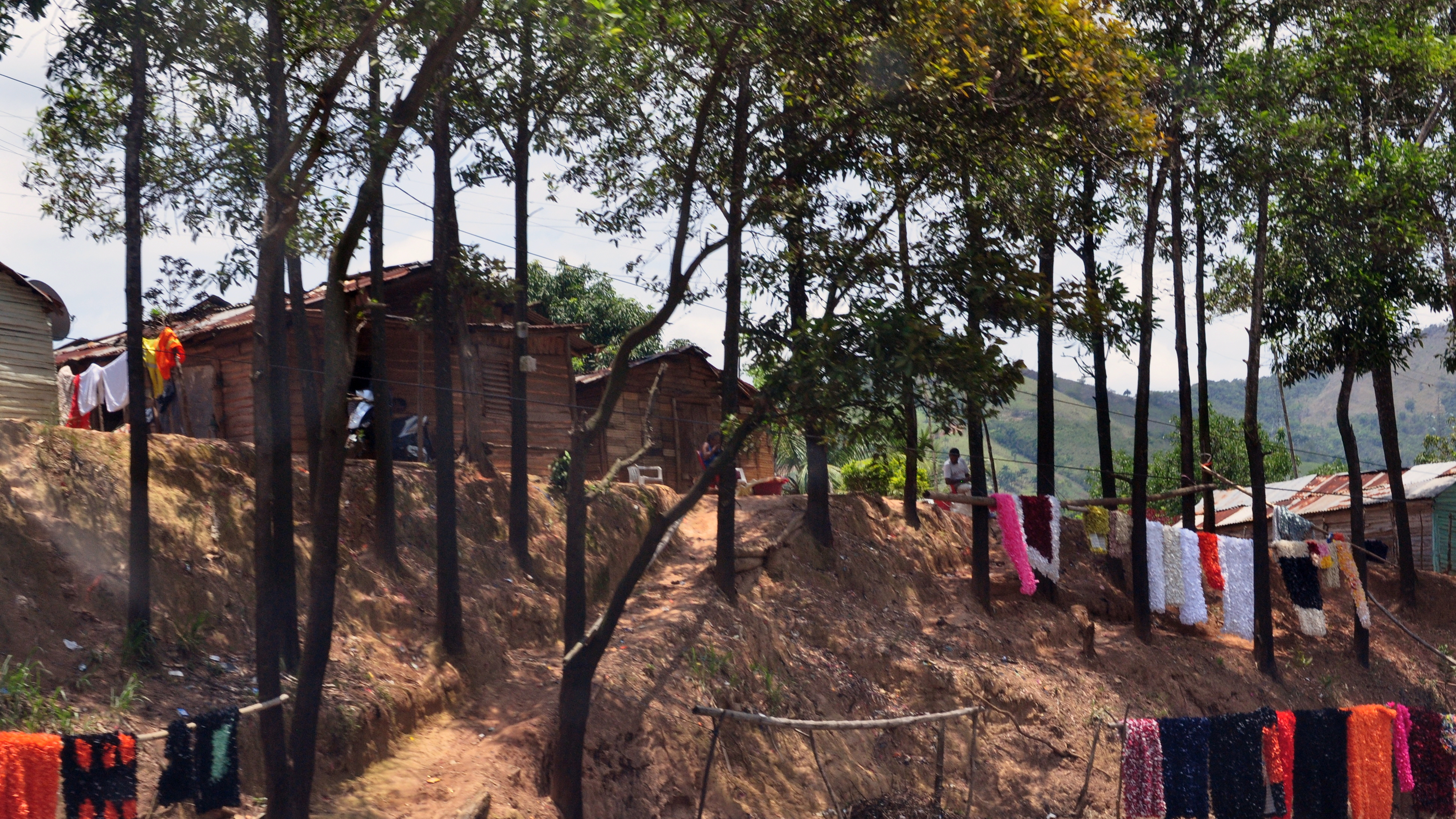
- Interactive map of Piedra Blanca
- Location within the Dominican Republic
- Coordinates: 18°50′47″N 70°19′00″W
- Country: Dominican Republic
- Province: Monseñor Nouel

Area
  - Total: 237.95 km^{2} (91.87 sq mi)

Population (2012)
  - Total: 24,785
  - Density: 104.16/km^{2} (269.77/sq mi)
- Distance to – Santo Domingo: 68 km
- Municipal Districts: 2

Piedra Blanca (literally, "White Stone") is a city in Monseñor Nouel province, Dominican Republic.
