= Castle of Olbreuse =

Castle in western France

Coordinates: 46.1831°N 0.6006°W

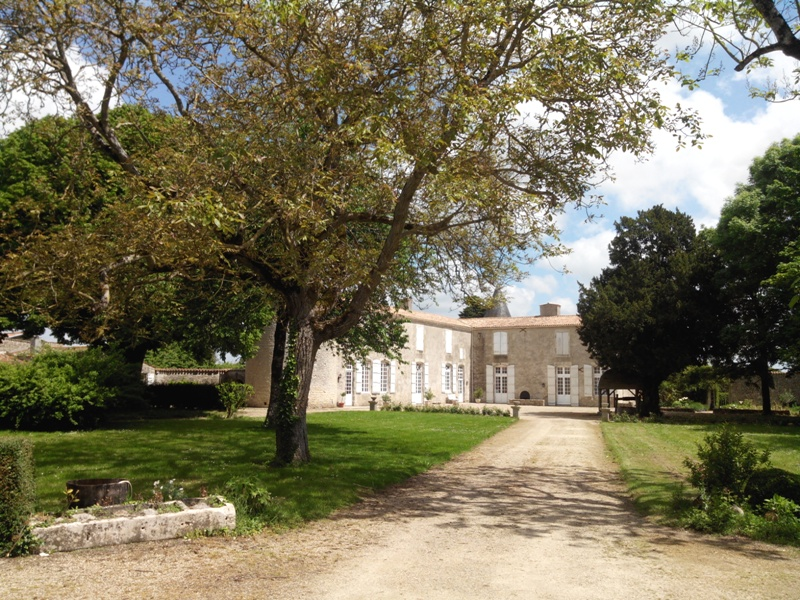
Castle of Olbreuse in Usseau

The Castle of Olbreuse is situated in Usseau, Deux-Sèvres, in western France. It is thought to have been built in the eleventh century but documentation for this supposition is lacking.

== History ==
=== The castle and Protestantism ===
The Castle of Olbreuse is known for its affiliation with Protestantism, specifically Calvinism, in the sixteenth century. At the time the castle belonged to a branch of the Desmier family, the Desmier of Olbreuse. In the early eighteenth century the castle belonged to Éléonore Desmier d'Olbreuse, daughter of Alexandre Desmier of Olbreuse (1608–1660). In 1702, King Louis XIV put the castle into receivership to punish its owner for aiding Protestants. Since the conversion of the Desmier family to Calvinism, they had assisted partisans’ resistance against Catholic oppression. Many Huguenots fled France after the Edict of Nantes (allowing religious freedom after the Reformation) was revoked in 1685, when non-Catholics were offered the choice of conversion or exile. Those who did not convert voluntarily, met with increasing oppression, confiscation of their properties and worse, including violence.

In 1685, Alexandre, the brother of Éléonore, lived at Olbreuse with his wife, who was the great-granddaughter of the poet Agrippa d'Aubigné, of Protestant background. Thanks to the protection of the House of Brunswick to which Éléonore belonged through her marriage to the German Prince George William, Duke of Brunswick-Lüneburg-Celle (1624–1705), he took the initiative to temporarily hide Protestants. Many found refuge and employment in Celle. One of those benefitting from the d’Olbreuses’ hospitality, the teacher of Mauzé-sur-le-Mignon told the story in his diary of the period. He writes of Alexandre Desmier "this veritable nurturer was not only support and a retreat for me and for you, but for all the people who came to ask for help and retreat during the persecution." In 1707, the receivership of Louis XIV was lifted and the castle was returned to Éléonore. On the death of the latter in 1722, the castle’s new owner was her daughter Sophia Dorothea of Celle, known as the Princess of Ahlden where she was kept under house arrest for the last 32 years of her life following the acrimonious divorce from her husband George, Prince of Hanover who became King George I of Great Britain in 1714. She died four years later leaving the property to her children, George II of Great Britain and Sophia Dorothea of Hanover.

=== The castle and the family Prevot of Gagemont ===
In 1727 Sophie's husband, Frederick William I, made inquiries and learned that the castle reported an income of 2110 pounds a year. Both heirs decided to "outright gift" for 40,000 pounds the castle to their Olbreuse cousins of the Prévot de Gagemont family, who were Catholics. This transaction was authorized by Louis XV, 17 September 1729 in a decree:

"Our beloved trusty Alexandre Prevost, lord of Gagemont ... has exposed us humbly having the honor of belonging as a cousin to our beloved deceased and beloved cousin, Madame Eleanor, Duchess of Brunswick Lüneburg maternal grandmother of our beloved king, brother King of Great Britain, and our very dear sister the Queen of Prussia that as heirs of this princess, of the land and lordship of Olbreuse, located in our kingdom, the land of Aunis today belongs: it is by this consideration and put Olbreuse said land in the family of the princess it has pleased our dear brother King of Great Britain and our very dear sister of the queen Prussia to donate to exhibitor (...) ".

It remained in that family until 1871; the last owner, Madame de Nossay, had no heirs.

=== The return to Desmiers ===
The castle, after an arrangement with Madame de Nossay, was sold to Baron Charles Desmier d’Olbreuse (1829–1915) to keep this monument from falling into the wrong hands. The baron was not a direct descendant of Éléonore Desmier d’Olbreuse, but came from a cousin branch, the Desmier Carliere, who immigrated during the Revolution and who on returning to France took the name of Desmier Olbreuse. The castle was again talked about in World War II, when it served as a hospital for blind war wounded.

=== Inn ===
In 1983, the castle of Olbreuse saw a revival with the creation of the LLC "Hostel Castle Olbreuse". Shareholders were the owners and their son Dominic, Mr. Jean Arrivée (chef) and Madame Arrivée (manager). The inn initially hosted seminars; four study rooms were available with a capacity of up to 100 people. The restaurant room had a capacity of 150 people for banquets and 200 for receptions and lunches. It also had eleven rooms steeped in the tradition and comfort of the old days. The menus proposed by chef Jean arrived were meant to close the soil. They were composed of up to products from the region (e.g. fish freshly arrived from La Rochelle). The specialities of the inn were goat cheese, turbot with a sabayon green pepper sauce, duck breast with goat cheese, sweetbread braised with Pineau des Charentes, frozen nougat angelica in Niort, hot apple puffs and cider sabayon. The inn of the castle closed its doors permanently when the property was sold in 1996.

=== Secrets and myths surrounding the castle ===
Olbreuse since its creation been the subject of much controversy. Some people from the local area retell stories that have passed from generation to generation that the castle was burned 27 times. The existence of a salt cellar inside the property is also debated. This theory is very likely true, since salt was widely used for food preservation. Other statements say that the southwest tower imprisons a murderess, a story denied by contemporary owners. Tunnels were built below the castle, known by everyone who lives nearby. These tunnels through the village of Olbreuse they were prolonged to the Mauzé Mignon (located 6.6 km [4.1 mi] from Olbreuse). Other tunnels went underground to the church of Our Lady of Dey (located south of the town of Prin-Deyrançon about 7 kilometers [4.3 mi] from Olbreuse) and some even came out in the woods of Olbreuse. These tunnels were used during the French religious wars to allow Protestants to hide and to flee. They were well built, and it was sometimes even possible to stand up. At present, these tunnels are impassable or even destroyed.

== The Desmier d'Olbreuse ==
A family of military tradition, they wore a coats of arms of prestigious simplicity: "quartered azure and silver four lilies in each color in the other," in other words an azure fleur de lys in each silver quarter and a silver fleur de lys in each of the azure quarters. Tradition has it that this shield them was granted them by King John the Good at the battle of Poitiers. The genealogical dictionary of the families of Poitou by Henri Beauchet-Filleau finds their traces as far back as the 14th century.

== Architecture ==
While Olbreuse is very different today from what it was in the Middle Ages, it continues to be what it always was, a small castle, well integrated into the rural world. By the thirteenth century until the late Middle Ages, the castle was arranged in a simple design -- a rectangle with a tower of four storeys of arrowslits at each corner. Only two of these towers remain.

The building wing that connects them did not exist then. Instead there was a defensive wall that allowed access from the castle itself to the two advance towers. On the other side of the rectangle, a side wall joined the two towers now extinct. We still see the remains of that of the background in the corner of the old parking. Another front wall closed the courtyard but nothing remains of it today. There were wells that were especially deep (40 m) in the limestone soil, which provided water. The interesting woodwork that covers its imperial-style dome seems to date from the sixteenth or seventeenth century. Of the castle itself, the inhabited part consisted of a single building which were adjoined by the towers.

Only half now remains now, the rest having been demolished. This home was lower than the current building and had narrower windows. We see traces of a semicircular door that indicates the level of the first floor. Under the house was dug a vault, still very well preserved, including the external input is clearly distinguished in the middle of the building. Such a device was not designed to defend against real hosts. It mainly served to keep the lord, his family, his people and villagers safe from the bands of prowlers who were not unknown, especially during the Hundred Years' War. In the eighteenth century, around 1760 if we are to believe the inscriptions placed on the lintel of some doors, the Prevot family commitment, then owner of the castle, removed the defensive wall and built the wing perpendicular to the central building of the body. The corner room is a large kitchen with stone paving and garden, in which stands a large fireplace. It has changed little since that time and the imposing rustic table remains in place. In contrast with the tower is installed a wood lounge very well preserved. At that time, the wing did not have high first floor windows: only a kind of attic with small openings. The roof, in the local manner, was still a slightly slanted roof of Roman tiles. The windows of the central building were enlarged and heightened first floor. The weathervanes on each of the towers are of the same period, as evidenced by the dates contained thereon. At the end of the nineteenth century, the castle returned to the Desmier family. They found it too small and decided to raise the floor of the wing, replacing the traditional roof with a much steeper frame they then covered with zinc. They also knocked down the second tower that is in ruins. Then began a period of deterioration for the building, which its owners do not have the resources to renovate. In 1967, one of the Olbreuse Desmier heirs, Christiane and her husband Felix Maingueneau, noting the extreme dilapidation the castle, decided to restore it and register it on the inventory of historical monuments.

== Owners ==
As far back as can be traced, the castle has been owned by a branch of the family Desmier: The Desmier of Olbreuse. In the early seventeenth century, the castle owner Alexander Desmier d'Olbreuse (1608–1660) married in first nuptials Jacqueline Poussard De Vandre. From their union were born four children, Eleanor. He then married Jeanne Beranger Du Beugnon, and had two sons, Henri and Jean. The children of the first marriage like the ones from the second marriage died without heirs, except Eleanor. At his death in 1722, she left Olbreuse to her daughter, Sophia Dorothea. She was the wife of George I, King of Great Britain but she died in 1726; the castle became property of her children, George II and Queen Sophia of Prussia. In 1729, the castle was owned by the Prevot of Gagemont family until 1871. Later the castle belonged to Baron Charles Desmier of Olbreuse until 1915. His daughter Naomi inherited it and owned it until her death in 1964. Upon her death the castle returned to her daughter, Christiane Desmier of Olbreuse and her husband Félix Maingueneau, who owned it until 1996. It now belongs to the Boscals de Reals family.

== See also ==
- Usseau

== Notes and references ==
=== Bibliography ===
- Châteaux, manoirs, logis des Deux-Sèvres, Prahecq, éditions Patrimoines et Médias, 1993 ISBN 2-910137-04-X
