= Jima Abajo =

- Location within the Dominican Republic
- Coordinates: 19°7′48″N 70°22′48″W
- Country: Dominican Republic
- Province: La Vega

Area
  - Total: 132.72 km^{2} (51.24 sq mi)
- Elevation: 100 m (330 ft)

Population (2012)
  - Total: 29,685
  - Density: 223.67/km^{2} (579.29/sq mi)
  - Urban: 27,796
- Municipal Districts: 1
- Climate: Af

Jima Abajo is a town in the La Vega province of the Dominican Republic.

== Sources ==
- – World-Gazetteer.com
