= Bonao =

- City
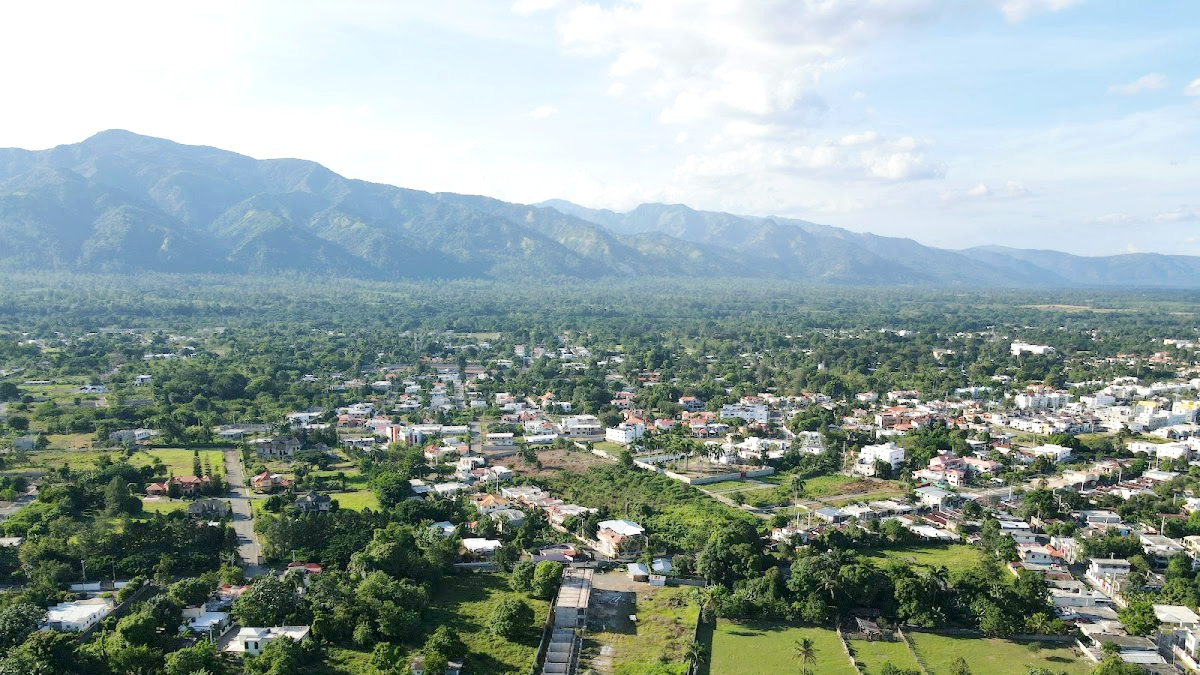
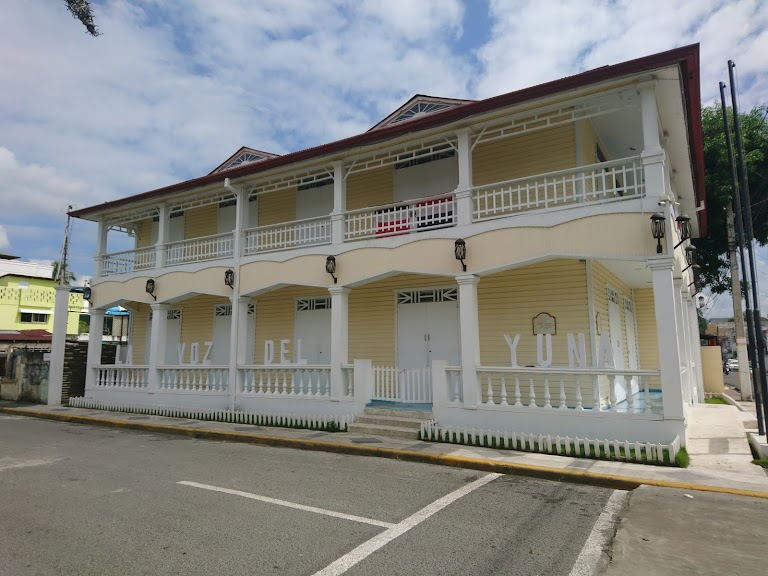
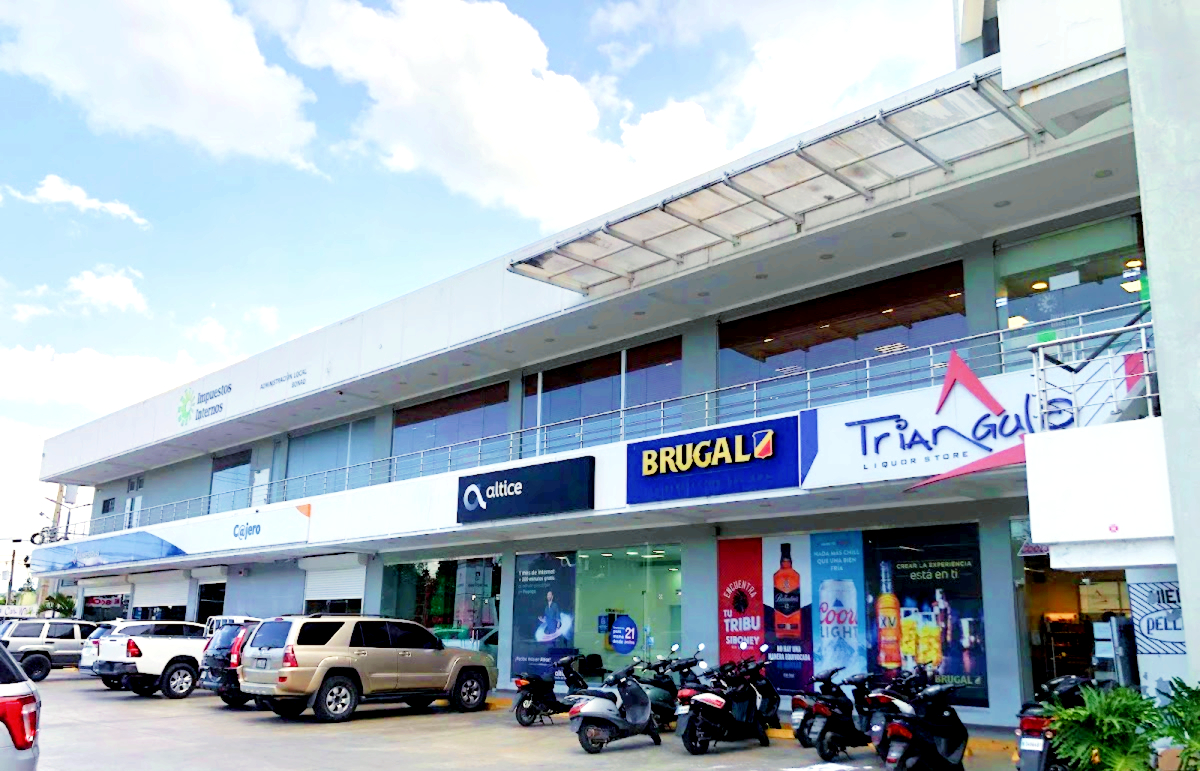
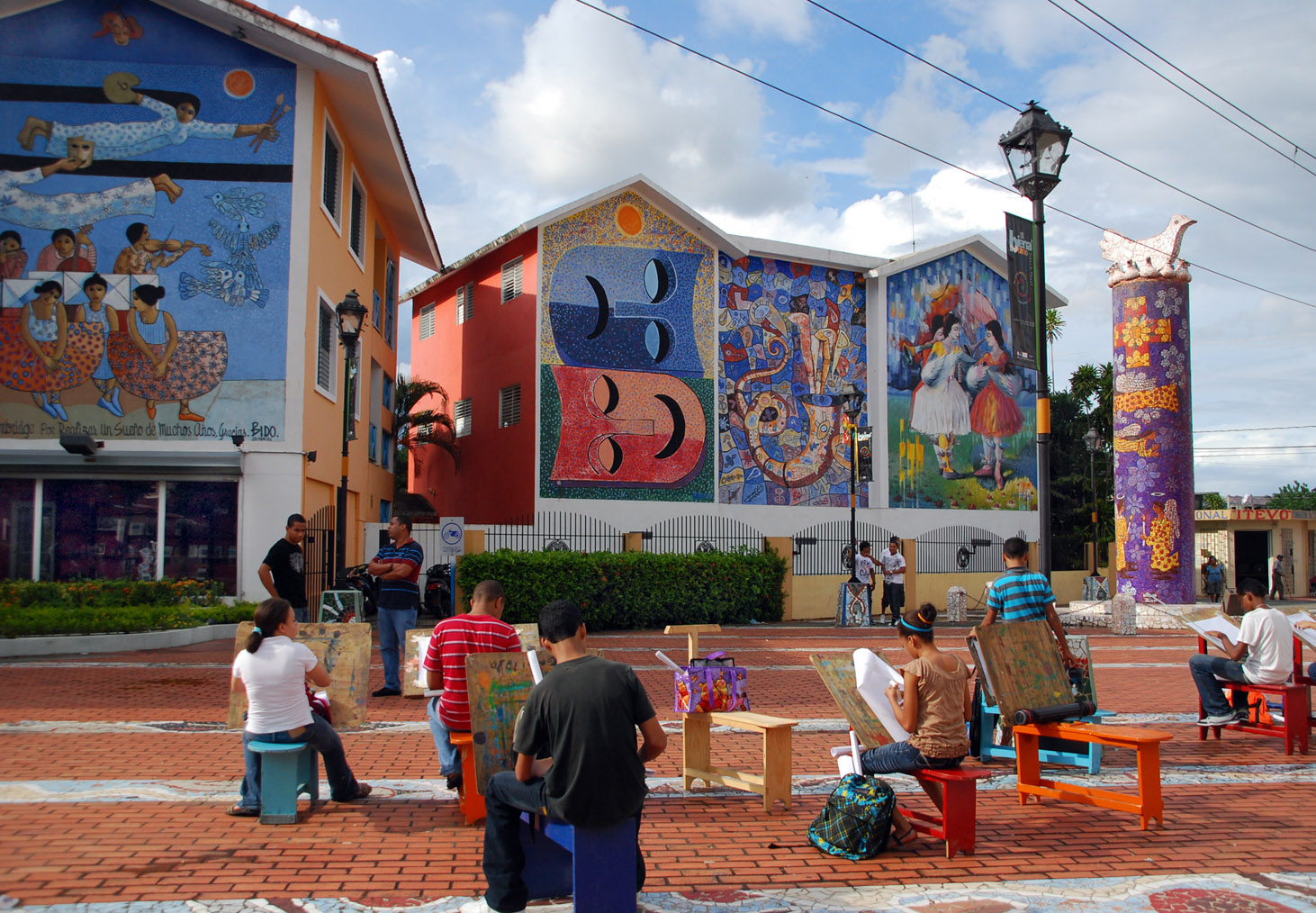
- From top, left to right: Aeriel view of Bonao; La Voz Del Yuna; Shopping center in the city; Plaza De La Cultura

- Coat of arms
- Nickname: "Villa de las Hortensias" (Town of Hydrangeas)
- Interactive map of Bonao
- Location in the Dominican Republic
- Coordinates: 18°55′56″N 70°24′32″W
- Country: Dominican Republic
- Province: Monseñor Nouel
- Founded: 1495
- Municipality since: 1865
- Founded by: Bartolomé Colón

Area
  - City: 664.37 km^{2} (256.51 sq mi)
- Elevation: 173 m (568 ft)

Population (2012)
  - City: 158,034
  - Density: 237.87/km^{2} (616.08/sq mi)
  - Urban: 60,044
- Time zone: UTC-4 (AST)
- Distance to: Santo Domingo: 85 km
- Municipal Districts: 5
- Climate: Af

Bonao is a city in the Cibao region of Dominican Republic. It is the capital of the Monseñor Nouel province. The city is located in the center of the country, to the northwest of the national capital Santo Domingo.

The city is known as "Villa de las Hortensias" - the town of hydrangeas. The Hortensia is the local flower of Bonao.

== History ==
Upon the arrival of the Spaniards, the territory belonged to the Taino chiefdom of Maguá. In 1495, Bartolomé Colón, during an exploration journey through the island, ordered the construction of a fortress to combat the resistance of the natives commanded by a chief with the name of Bonao.

The first fort built on the site was called Bonao Abajo, which was later occupied by Francisco Roldán, a Spanish soldier who rebelled against the colonial authorities in the island. In 1497, Roldán and 70 rebels, fought in the territory of Bonao against the authority of the Columbus. The rebellion was ended in October 1498. The origins of the town of Bonao are associated precisely with this rebellion, to the extent that many who participated stayed in the area.

On December 7, 1508, Bonao was officially granted the category of town and was granted a coat of arms. The main economic activity of this town was the mining of gold. When gold mining by the Spaniards on the island declined, two sugar mills were installed in Bonao. Sugar production was not enough of an incentive to maintain the attraction of the Spaniards over the town of Bonao. Around 1528 it had declined along with nearby towns.

After the nation's Independence in the middle of the 1800s, it became a military post in the municipality of La Vega, and in 1936 it became a municipality in the province of La Vega, and by the year 1865 the town was elevated to common of that province with the name of San Antonio de Bonao. The town remained relatively isolated and by it only had 5,000 inhabitants.

The economic revival of Bonao began in the 1920's when the Duarte highway was inaugurated, linking Santo Domingo with the Cibao region. The highway crossed through the town and became a popular stop for people making the long trip between the capital and Santiago. At that stop, the cars or buses refueled and the passengers rested, to drink and eat. It was in those years that several restaurants were opened.

=== Demographics ===
In that year, 1920, the first national census was carried out and in it the town of Bonao appeared with only 1,069 inhabitants, later rising to 2,129 in 1935 and 10,536 in the 1950 census. The most recent census, from 2010, tells us that the municipality of Bonao has 125,338 inhabitants.

== Economy ==
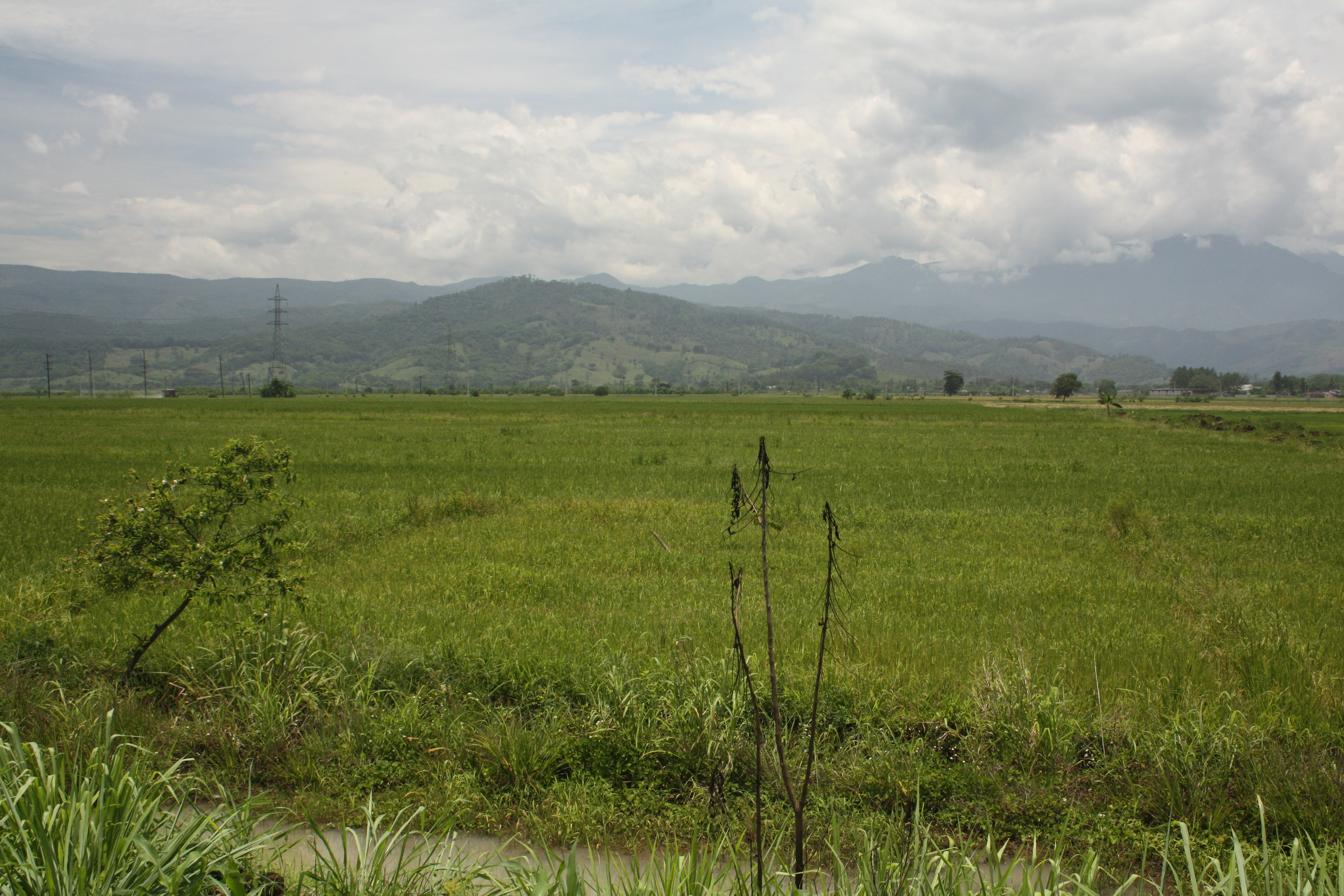
Rice fields in Bonao.

Bonao's economy is based on local businesses, agricultural producers and by the income generated by the mining company Americano Níquel (Falcondo), also known as Falconbridge Dominicana.

Bonao's agricultural production is 80% rice and the rest is divided into cocoa and coffee. There are also important companies that provide jobs such as: Bonao Industrial, Hanesbrands Dos Rios Textiles, Inc.

== Education and technology ==
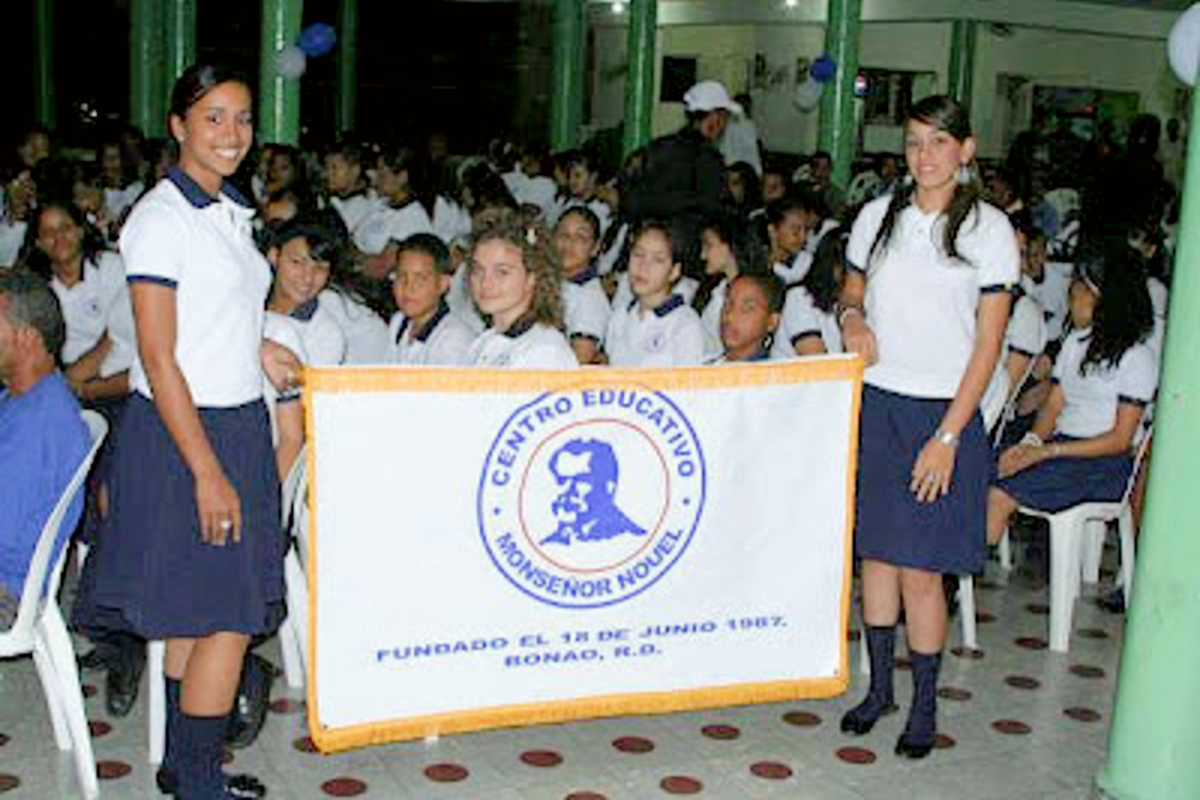
School students in Bonao, Dominican Republic.

There are several public and private basic and secondary schools in Bonao, among which the Elías Rodríguez Secondary School stands out, the so-called Francisco Antonio Batista García School, former Reform Plan; The Francisco Antonio Batista García Polytechnic with the areas of Computer Science, Commerce, Nursing, Industrial Technician; Polytechnic Ing. José Delio Guzmán and Pedro Antonio Frías, both from the public sector and the San Antonio de Padua private schools, Bonao Educational Center, sponsored by the Universidad Central del Este and Mercer University, Colegio San Pablo and Colegio Juan Pablo Duarte. Bonao also has a higher education center, a regional headquarters of the state Autonomous University of Santo Domingo (CURCE-UASD).

The first syngas plant in the country and the Caribbean, a plant that produces energy from vegetable materials such as rice straw, banana peels and other materials, was installed near the headquarters of the Dominican Agrarian Institute in Bonao. It was named in posthumous homage after Engineer Quilvio Cabrera, an outstanding promoter of technology in agriculture, and the main promoter of the installation of this plant in the country.

== Telecommunications ==
The city of Bonao has variety of local media, including Television, Radio and Digital formats. In the television media, the province has the Telecasa company that offers different television channels for the towns of Bonao and other cities and towns within the province.

Bonao is historically the home of La Voz Dominicana, the official radio and television station of the Dominican Republic during the regime of Rafael Trujillo. At first the station was a local radio broadcast called La Voz del Yuna (1943) in Bonao until Jose Trujillo (Petan), the brother of President Trujillo, acquired the station. Petan Trujillo later convinced his brother to get the equipment to turn the station into a radio/TV station, and in the early 1950s, what is called Radio Television Dominicana (RTVD) was founded. At this time in Latin America only three countries, Cuba, Dominican Republic, and Mexico had TV stations.

== Climate ==
Bonao has a trade-wind tropical rainforest climate (Köppen Af). There is no dry season, as all months average above 100 millimetres or 4 inches of rain, although there are distinctly wetter periods of the year in May and, under the influence of Atlantic hurricanes, from August to November.

Climate data for Bonao (1961-1990)
Month	Jan	Feb	Mar	Apr	May	Jun	Jul	Aug	Sep	Oct	Nov	Dec	Year
Record high °C (°F)	35.2 (95.4)	36.3 (97.3)	37.5 (99.5)	36.8 (98.2)	37.5 (99.5)	38.9 (102.0)	39.2 (102.6)	38.9 (102.0)	38.9 (102.0)	38.9 (102.0)	37.1 (98.8)	36.5 (97.7)	39.2 (102.6)
Mean daily maximum °C (°F)	29.5 (85.1)	29.9 (85.8)	30.8 (87.4)	31.3 (88.3)	31.7 (89.1)	32.9 (91.2)	33.0 (91.4)	33.0 (91.4)	33.1 (91.6)	32.6 (90.7)	31.2 (88.2)	29.5 (85.1)	31.5 (88.7)
Mean daily minimum °C (°F)	18.1 (64.6)	18.1 (64.6)	18.7 (65.7)	19.5 (67.1)	20.1 (68.2)	20.9 (69.6)	21.1 (70.0)	21.0 (69.8)	20.6 (69.1)	20.3 (68.5)	19.6 (67.3)	18.7 (65.7)	19.7 (67.5)
Record low °C (°F)	12.0 (53.6)	12.2 (54.0)	14.5 (58.1)	14.8 (58.6)	15.8 (60.4)	17.0 (62.6)	17.2 (63.0)	16.5 (61.7)	17.0 (62.6)	16.3 (61.3)	13.2 (55.8)	12.4 (54.3)	12.0 (53.6)
Average rainfall mm (inches)	107.2 (4.22)	108.3 (4.26)	117.7 (4.63)	204.1 (8.04)	333.3 (13.12)	138.8 (5.46)	176.3 (6.94)	203.9 (8.03)	180.2 (7.09)	251.8 (9.91)	248.2 (9.77)	146.4 (5.76)	2,216.2 (87.25)
Average rainy days (≥ 1.0 mm)	9.5	8.3	9.2	11.6	14.0	9.6	13.6	13.5	12.1	13.7	14.5	12.4	142.0
Source: NOAA

== Local scene ==
Motorcycles (especially mini-bikes and scooters also known as 'PASOLA') are the most common form of transportation in the city. There are also taxi and car rental services available. DR-1 (Autopista Duarte) bypasses the city to the east.

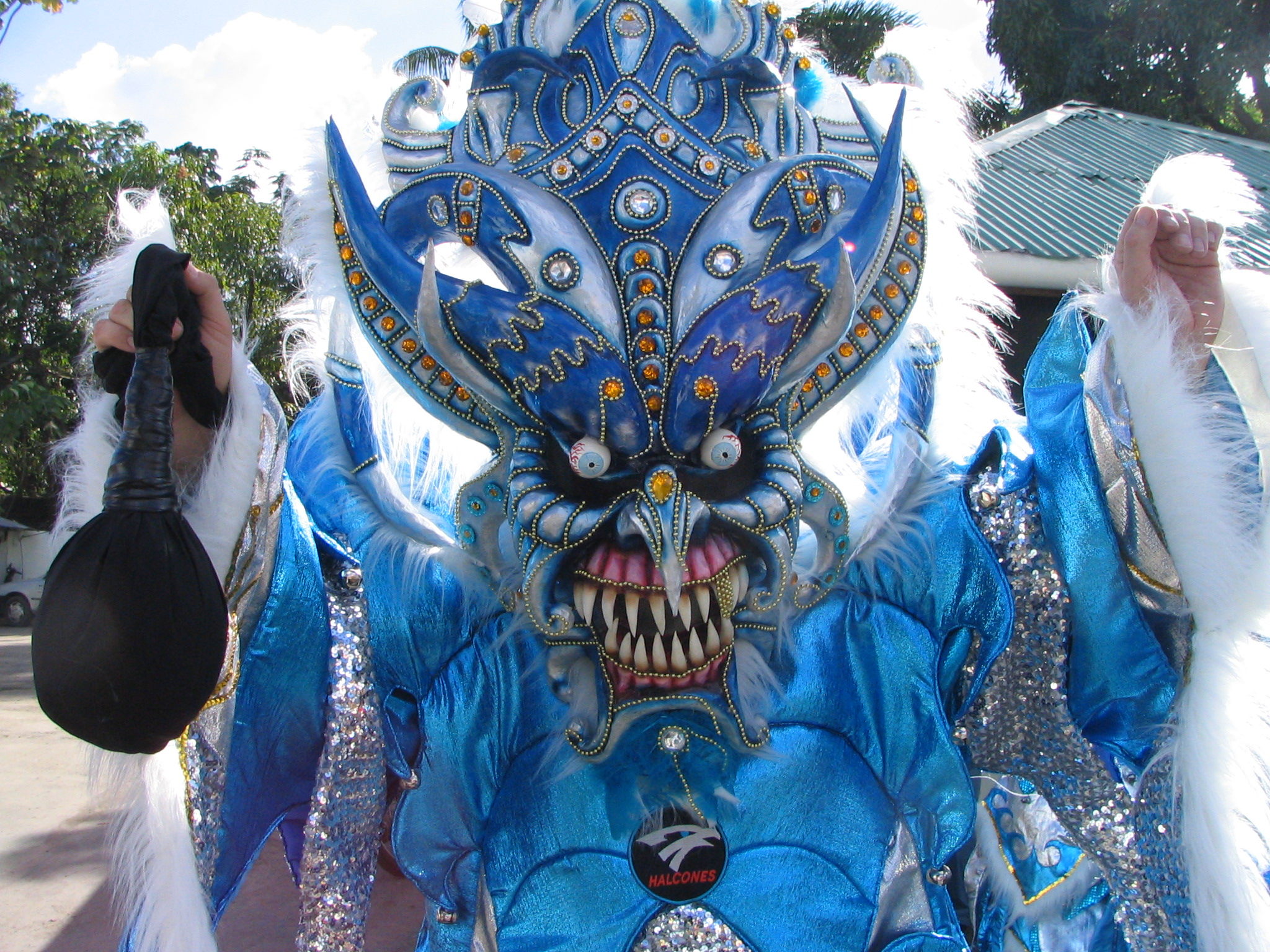
A costumed reveler during the 2006 carnival in Bonao.

A popular annual attraction is the Carnival. Groups that parade in the Carnival start out in "caves" (typically a blocked-off street) where loud music is played. Costumes are often slightly demonic in nature. During Carnival season, there is often a concert in the town square (El Parque Duarte), on Saturday night.

== People from Bonao ==
=== Sports ===
Major League Baseball former pitcher Carlos Mármol and Philadelphia Phillies catcher Deivy Grullón are from Bonao. Hansel Robles, relief pitcher for the Boston Red Sox, is also from Bonao. Free agent third basemen Juan Francisco, "Baby Huey", is from Bonao. Also, former big league pitcher Benito Baez is from there too, as well as Joel Peralta, relief pitcher for Los Angeles Dodgers.

=== Entertainment ===
The singer and music composer, Hector Acosta 'El Torito', is one of the icons of the country. Luis Días, composer of the popular song "Baile en la Calle", was born in Bonao.

=== Politics ===
Aniana Vargas, a prominent female activist during the 1965 Civil War, was born and raised in Bonao.
