= La Vega Province =

Province of the Dominican Republic

La Vega
- Province
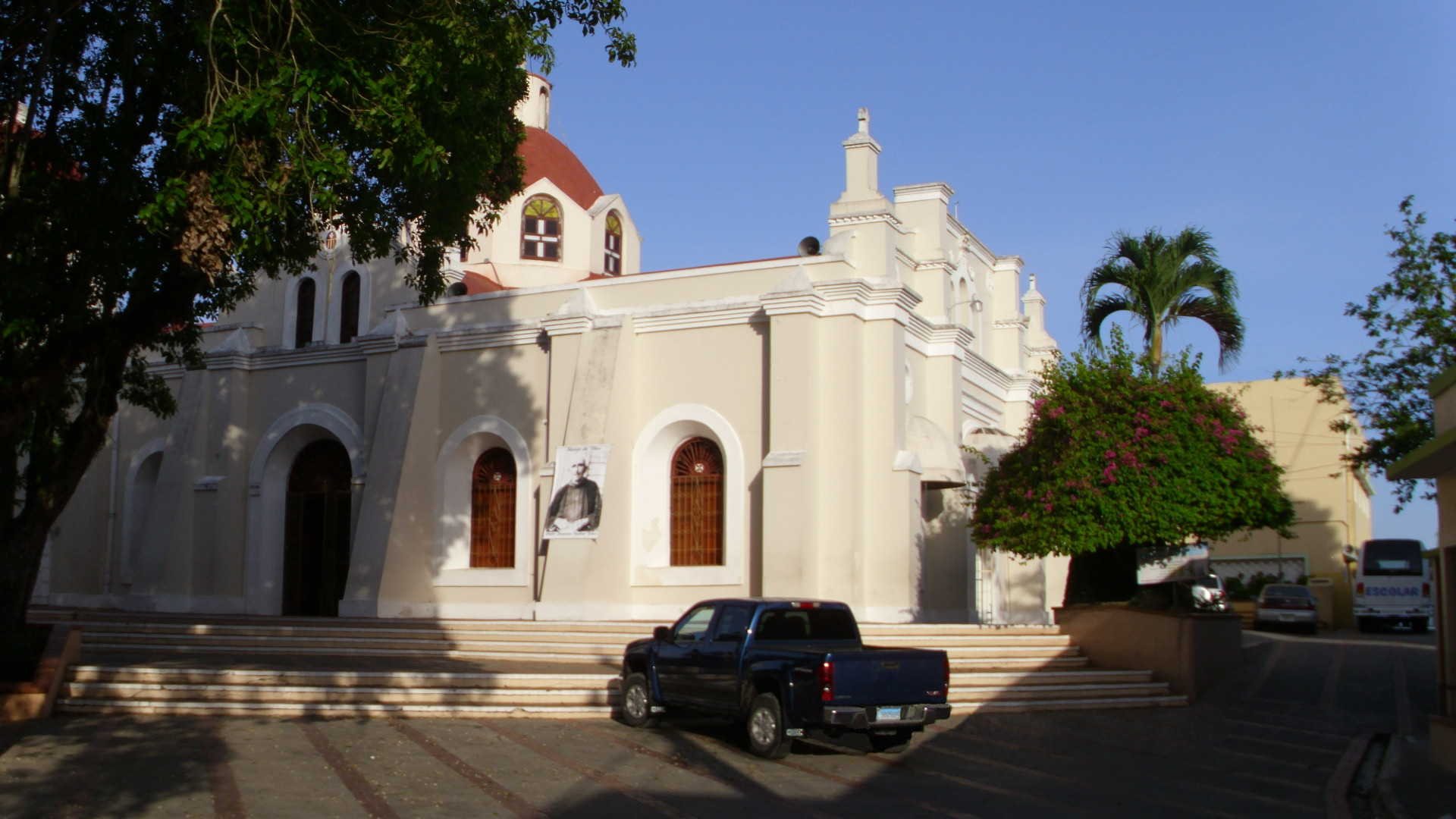
- Santo Cerro church in La Vega

- Coat of arms

- Location of the La Vega Province
- Country: Dominican Republic
- Region: Cibao
- Province since: 1844
- Seat: La Vega

Government
  - Type: Subdivisions
  - Body: 4 municipalities 7 municipal districts
  - Congresspersons: 1 Senator; 8 Deputies

Area
  - Total: 2,287.24 km^{2} (883.11 sq mi)

Population (2014)
  - Total: 447,905
  - Density: 195.828/km^{2} (507.191/sq mi)
- Time zone: UTC-4 (EST)
- Area code: 1–809 1–829 1–849
- ISO 3166-2: DO-13
- Postal Code: 41000

La Vega (Spanish pronunciation: [la ˈβeɣa]) is one of the 32 provinces of the Dominican Republic. It is located in the Cibao Valley, the north-central region of the country, and is divided into 4 municipalities with its capital city being the namesake of La Vega. The province borders Espaillat and Hermanas Mirabal to the north, Duarte to the east, Monseñor Nouel to the south and Santiago to the west.

== History ==
The first settlement made by Christopher Columbus in the area was on December 8, 1494. Its initial economic development was based on gold mining. In the early 16th century, it had a cathedral, plus two convents, the fort, a building that functioned as a hospital, and administration buildings. In La Vega the first coin was minted and the first merchants settled. It is also the site of one of the mayor battles between Spaniards and indigenous people.

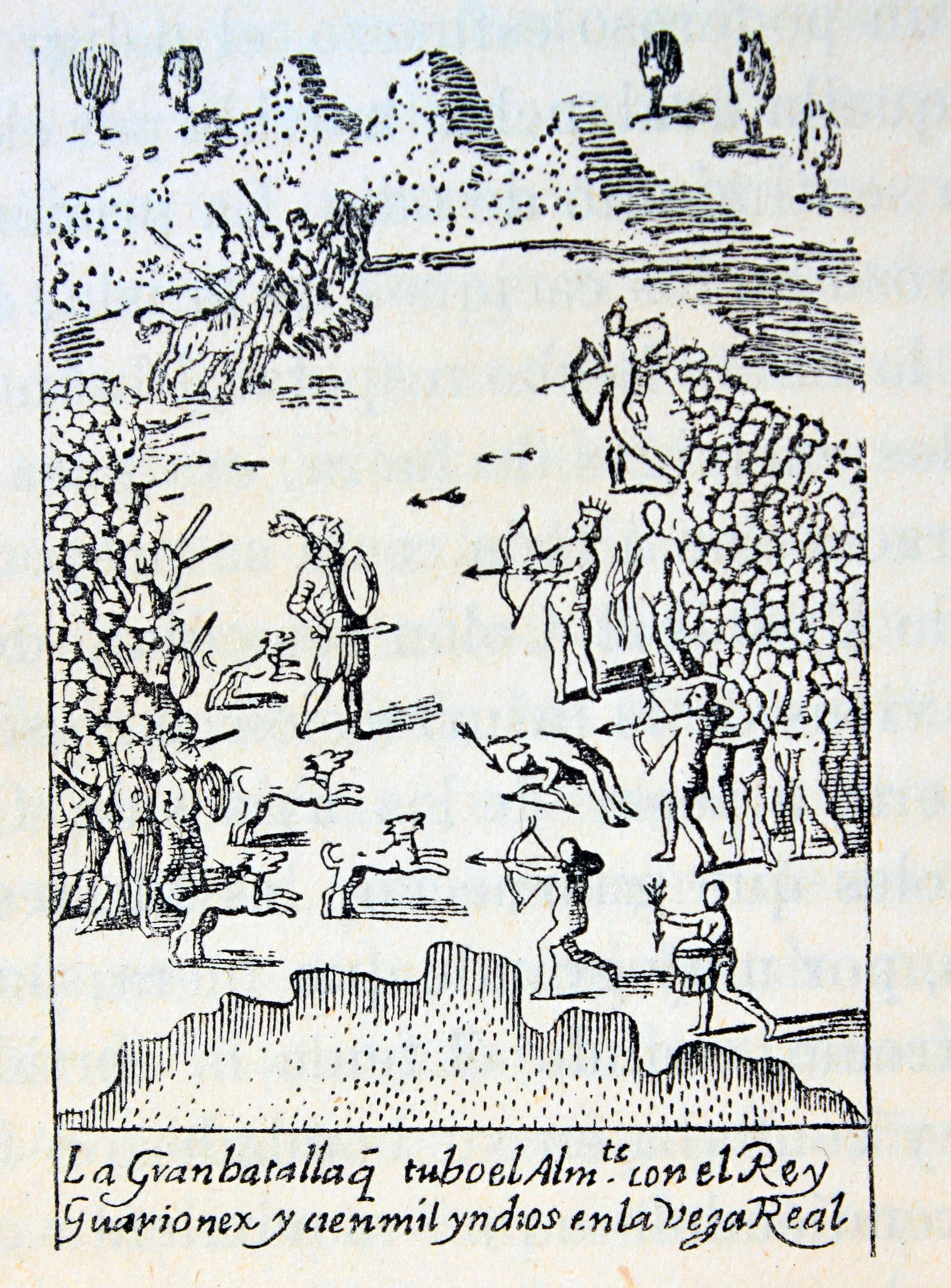
Battle of Santo Cerro

On December 2, 1562, the city was destroyed by an earthquake, being moved to the southern bank of the Camú River. The second foundation of the city corresponds to its current location and it is believed that it took place between the years 1562 and 1563.

During the 17th and 18th centuries the area suffered a decline. By the first decades of the 1700s, the city of La Vega had a population that approached only 3,000 people. The city was reestablished again on March 13, 1813, when the island, after having spent some years under the French rule, was once again under the power of the Spanish Crown, until the unification of Hispaniola in 1822. During this time the progress was slow and scarce. On May 7, 1842, the city was once again struck down by an earthquake, which destroyed its main buildings, such as the Government Palace and the Church.

In the days of National Independence, the city of La Vega joined the cause of freedom with soldiers. On March 4, 1844, La Vega formalized its declaration in favor of independence, and that same day it became the first town in the country to raise the tricolor flag. Commerce, agriculture and industry gained new momentum with the immigrants from Santo Domingo, Santiago, Moca and other places. The first theater in the country, bearing the same name, was also built.

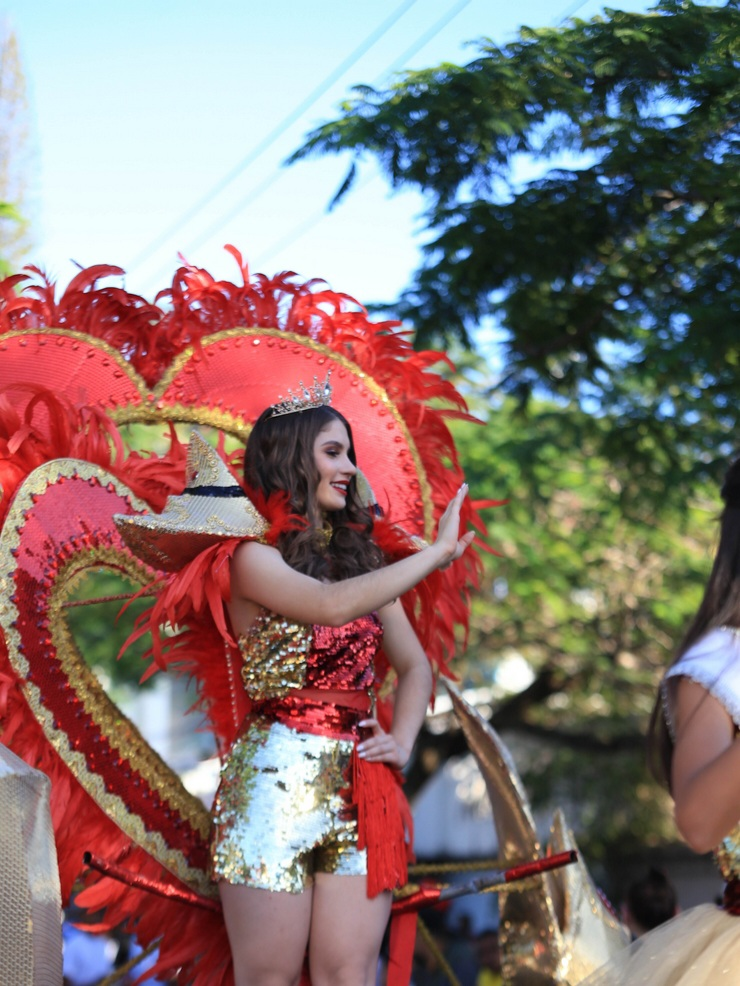
Dominican Republic carnival of La Vega

An event that strengthened the economic development of the area was the inauguration of the railway between the port of Las Cañitas (Sánchez) and the city of La Vega, the product of the efforts of the worthy Gregorio Rivas. The transport by this means of fruits and merchandise led to new living conditions. In 1915 the city received the name of a cultured city, due to its dedication to art and culture. In the place of the ruins of the first city, there is an archaeological park and a museum. Over the years, a town called Pueblo Viejo has emerged, in honor of the first place where the city existed.

== Municipalities and municipal districts ==
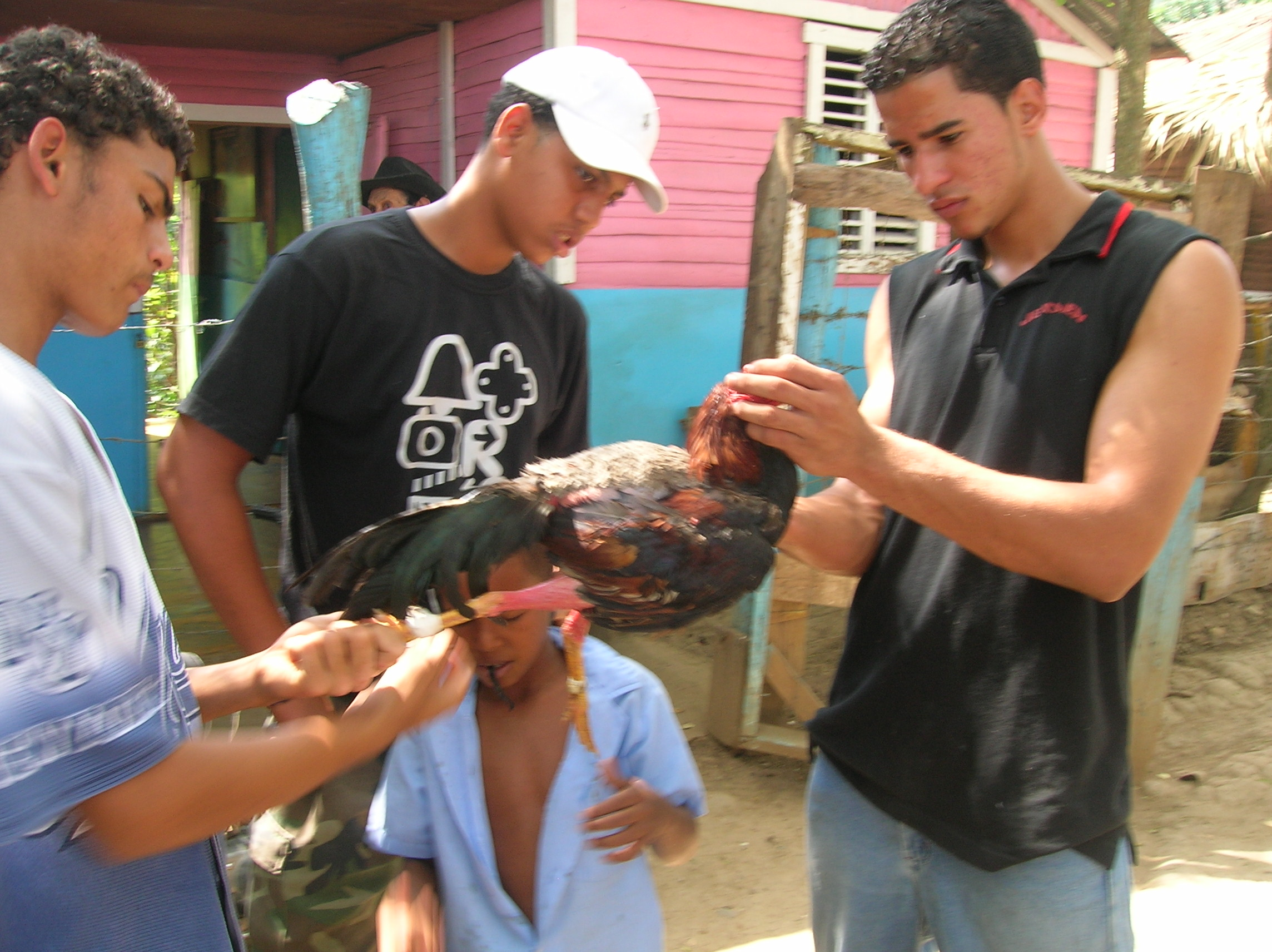
People in countryside of La Vega, Dominican Republic

The province as of June 20, 2006 is divided into the following municipalities (municipios) and municipal districts (distrito municipal – D.M.) within them:

- La Vega (city)
  - El Ranchito (D.M.)
  - Río Verde Arriba (D.M.)
  - Cutupú
- Constanza
  - La Sabina (D.M.)
  - Tireo (D.M.)
- Jarabacoa
  - Buena Vista (D.M.)
  - Manabao (D.M.)
- Jima Abajo
  - Rincón (D.M.)

For comparison with the municipalities and municipal districts of other provinces see the list of municipalities and municipal districts of the Dominican Republic.

The following is a sortable table of the municipalities and municipal districts with population figures as of the 2012 census. Urban population are those living in the seats (cabeceras literally heads) of municipalities or of municipal districts. Rural population are those living in the districts (Secciones literally sections) and neighborhoods (Parajes literally places) outside of them.

Name	Total population	Urban population	Rural population
La Vega (city)	235,698	101,585	134,113
Constanza	85,240	40,019	45,221
Jarabacoa	69,855	32,585	37,270
Jima Abajo	29,685	27,796	1,889
La Vega province	420,478	201,985	218,493
