= Sabana del Puerto =

Town in Monseñor Nouel, Dominican Republic

- Interactive map of Sabana del Puerto
- Location within the Dominican Republic
- Coordinates: 19°01′31″N 70°26′37″W
- Country: Dominican Republic
- Province: Monseñor Nouel

Population (2008)
  - Total: 1,292

Sabana del Puerto is a town in the Monseñor Nouel province of the Dominican Republic.

== Sources ==
- – World-Gazetteer.com
