= Monseñor Nouel Province =

Province of the Dominican Republic

Monseñor Nouel
- Province
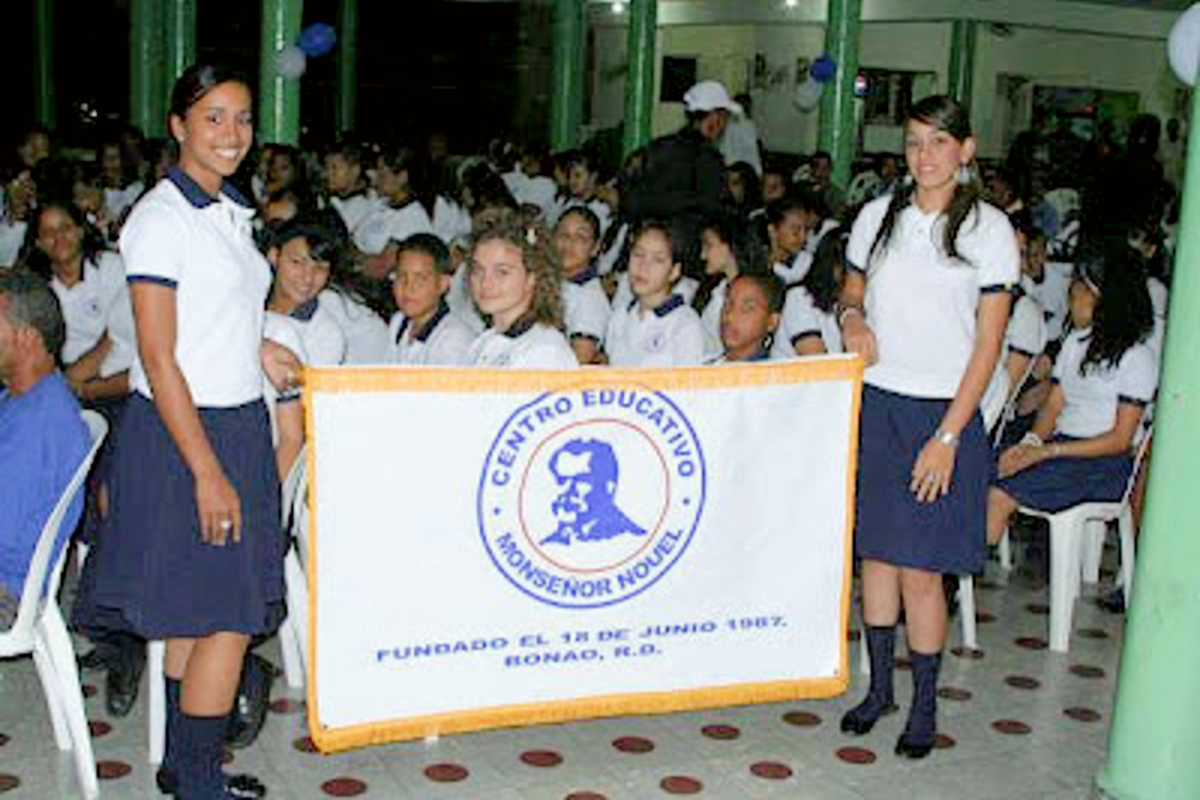
- Students in Bonao, Monseñor Nouel, Dominican Republic

- Flag

- Location of the Monseñor Nouel Province
- Country: Dominican Republic
- Region: Cibao
- Province since: 1991
- Capital: Bonao

Government
  - Type: Subdivisions
  - Body: 3 municipalities 7 municipal districts
  - Congresspersons: 1 Senator; 3 Deputies

Area
  - Total: 992.39 km^{2} (383.16 sq mi)

Population (2014)
  - Total: 203,183
  - Density: 204.74/km^{2} (530.28/sq mi)
- Time zone: UTC-4 (AST)
- Area code: 1-809 1-829 1-849
- ISO 3166-2: DO-28
- Postal Code: 42000

Monseñor Nouel (Spanish pronunciation: [monseˈɲoɾ noˈwel]) is a province in the central region of the Dominican Republic. It was split from La Vega province in 1982.

== Name ==
The province is named after Monseñor Dr. Adolfo Alejandro Nouel y Bobadilla (1862-1937), an Archbishop of Santo Domingo who was briefly President of the Republic from 1912 to 1913.

== History ==
Upon the arrival of the Spaniards, the territory of the Monseñor Nouel province belonged to the Taino Maguá chiefdom. In 1495, Bartolomé Colón, during a voyage of exploration across the island, ordered the construction of a fortress in Sonador to combat the resistance of the local Tainos commanded by a chief named Bonao.

It is said that the first fort built in the place was called Bonao Abajo, La Colonia or La Entrada, which the people of Francisco Roldán later occupied. The Indians of Rincón de Yuboa or Bonao Arriba, beaten and pressured by the Spaniards, disappeared from the place, rising towards the caves of Último Cielo, in the Los Capaces jurisdiction.

In 1497, Francisco Roldán and 70 rebels, participants in the Roldán Rebellion, took refuge in the territory of Bonao, rebelling against the authority of the Columbus brothers. The rebellion ended in October 1498. The origins of the town of Bonao are precisely associated with this rebellion, insofar as some of those who participated in it stayed there when it ended.

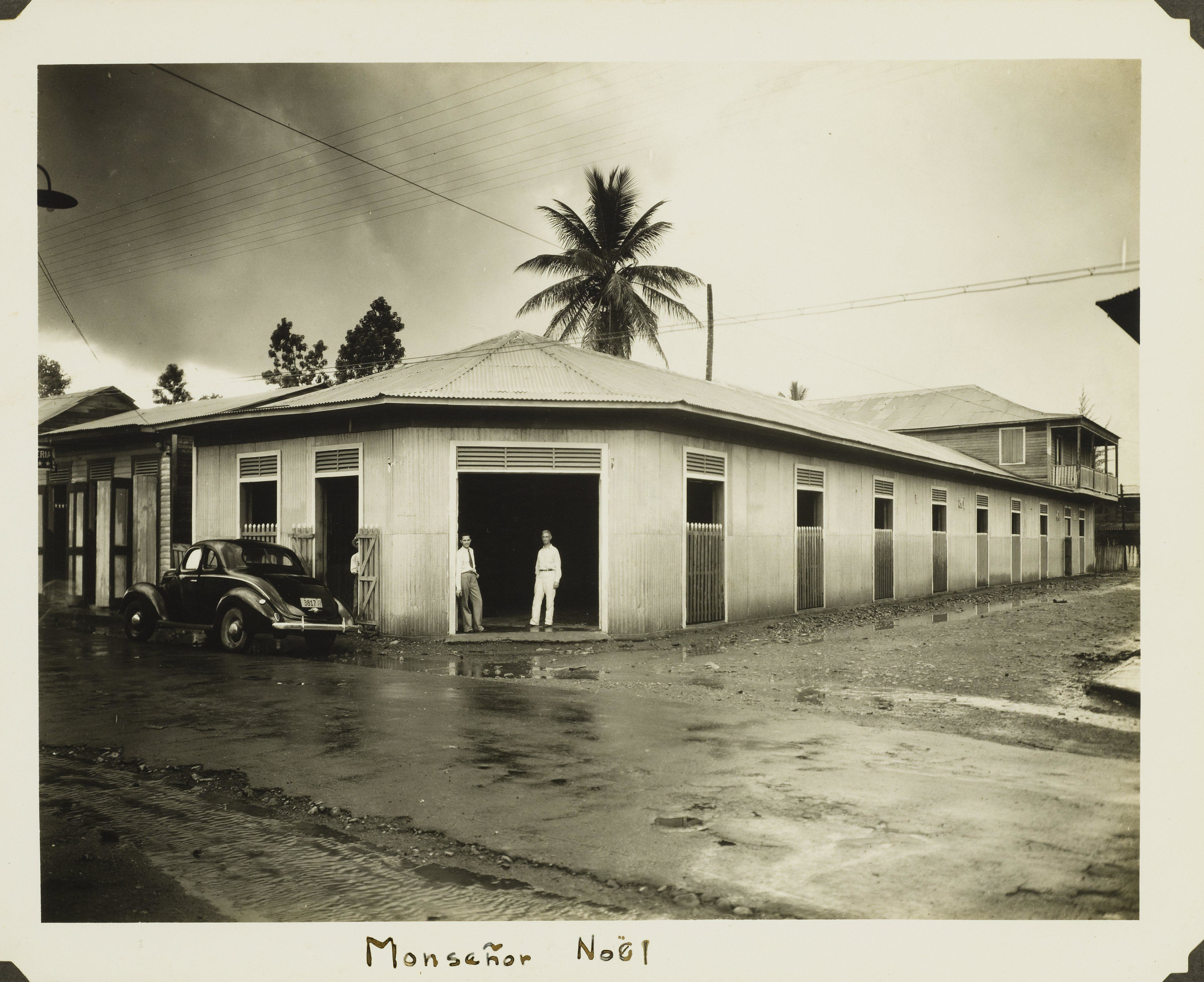
Photograph of Monseñor Nouel in 1938

On December 7, 1508, Bonao was officially granted the category of town and was awarded a coat of arms. The main economic activity of this town was gold mining. When the exploitation of gold by the Spanish on the island was exhausted, two sugar mills were installed in Bonao, according to Bachelor Alonso de Parada in a report made to King Carlos V and that appears in the book Santo Domingo in the Manuscripts of Juan Bautista Muñoz transcribed by Roberto Marte.

The name of Monseñor Nouel, associated with Bonao, arose for the first time in 1936 of Santo Domingo in honor of the former president of the Republic. In 1960, the town's name, Bonao, was restored, but the municipality remained with its name, Monseñor Nouel. This designation was also given to the province when it was created in 1982 under the government of then-President Salvador Jorge Blanco.

== Geography ==
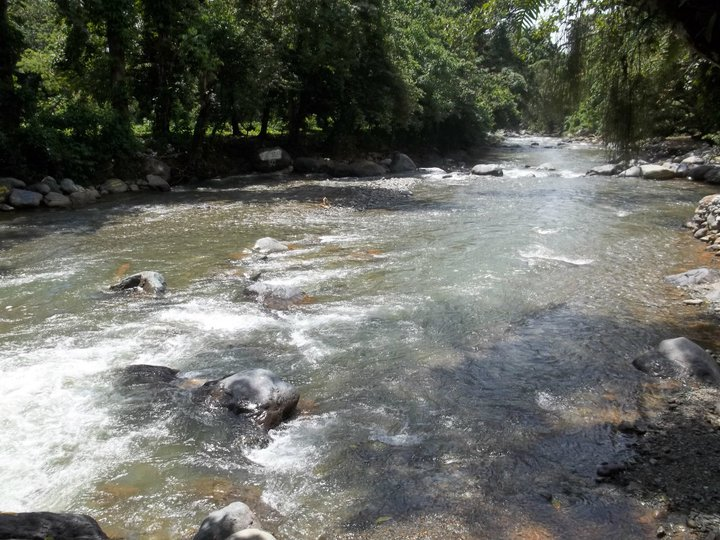
River in Monseñor Nouel Province

The province has an area of 992.39 km2 (383.16 sq mi) located in the central Cibao region. It is bordered to the North and West, by the La Vega Province, to the East the Sánchez Ramírez and Monte Plata provinces, and to the South by the San Cristóbal and San José de Ocoa provinces. The Central Mountain Range is located to the north and west of the province, while a branch of said mountain range, the Sierra de Yamasá, borders the province to the east. The main river in the province is the Yuna; all other rivers are tributaries of that river. Some of them are the Blanco, Maimon, Juma, Masipedro, Jima rivers. The Rincón dam is also located in this province.

== Economy and development ==
The area's main economic activity is dominated by local businesses, agricultural producers and the income generated by the Falconbridge Nickel Mines. Ferronickel exploitation is located in this province, which is the primary metallic mining activity in the country today. The main agricultural items in the province are rice, coffee and cocoa. Some large companies provide jobs, such as Bonao Industrial, Hanesbrands, Dos Rios Textiles, Inc.

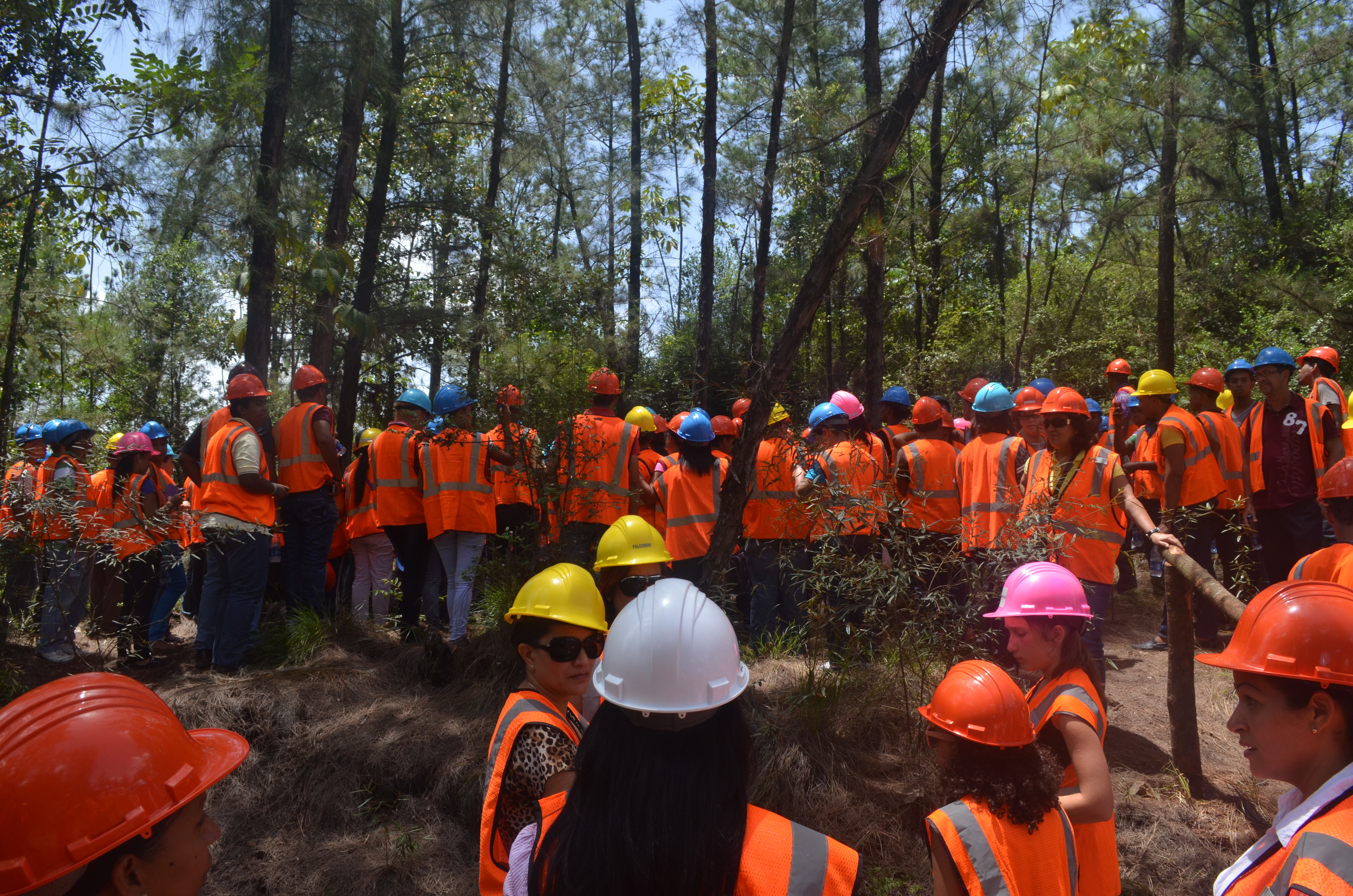
Workers in Monseñor Nouel province

Several public and private basic and secondary educational establishments in the province specialize in commerce, informatics, industrial technicians, polytechnics, and other fields. Bonao also has a higher education center, the regional headquarters of the state Autonomous University of Santo Domingo (CURCE-UASD).

The province has several communication media centers, such as Television, Radio and Digital Media. In the television media, the province has the Telecasa company that offers different television channels for the towns of Bonao and Maimón; among these channels are Yunavisión Channel 10, Maimón TV Channel 3, and Bonao TV Channel 12. In the media of radio are Latina FM and Novel 93 FM.

== Municipalities and municipal districts ==
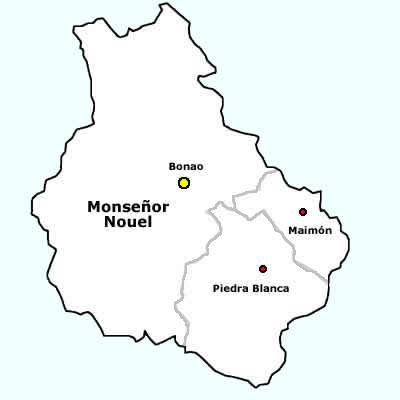
Municipalities of the Province

The province as of June 20, 2006 is divided into the following municipalities (municipios) and municipal districts (distrito municipal - D.M.) within them:

- Bonao
  - Arroyo Toro-Masipedro (D.M.)
  - Jayaco (D.M.)
  - Juma Bejucal (D.M.)
- La Salvia-Los Quemados
  - Sabana del Puerto (D.M.)
- Maimón
- Piedra Blanca
  - Juan Adrián (D.M.)
  - Villa Sonador (D.M.)

The following is a sortable table of the municipalities and municipal districts with population figures as of the 2012 census. Urban population are those living in the seats (cabeceras literally heads) of municipalities or of municipal districts. Rural population are those living in the districts (Secciones literally sections) and neighborhoods (Parajes literally places) outside of them.

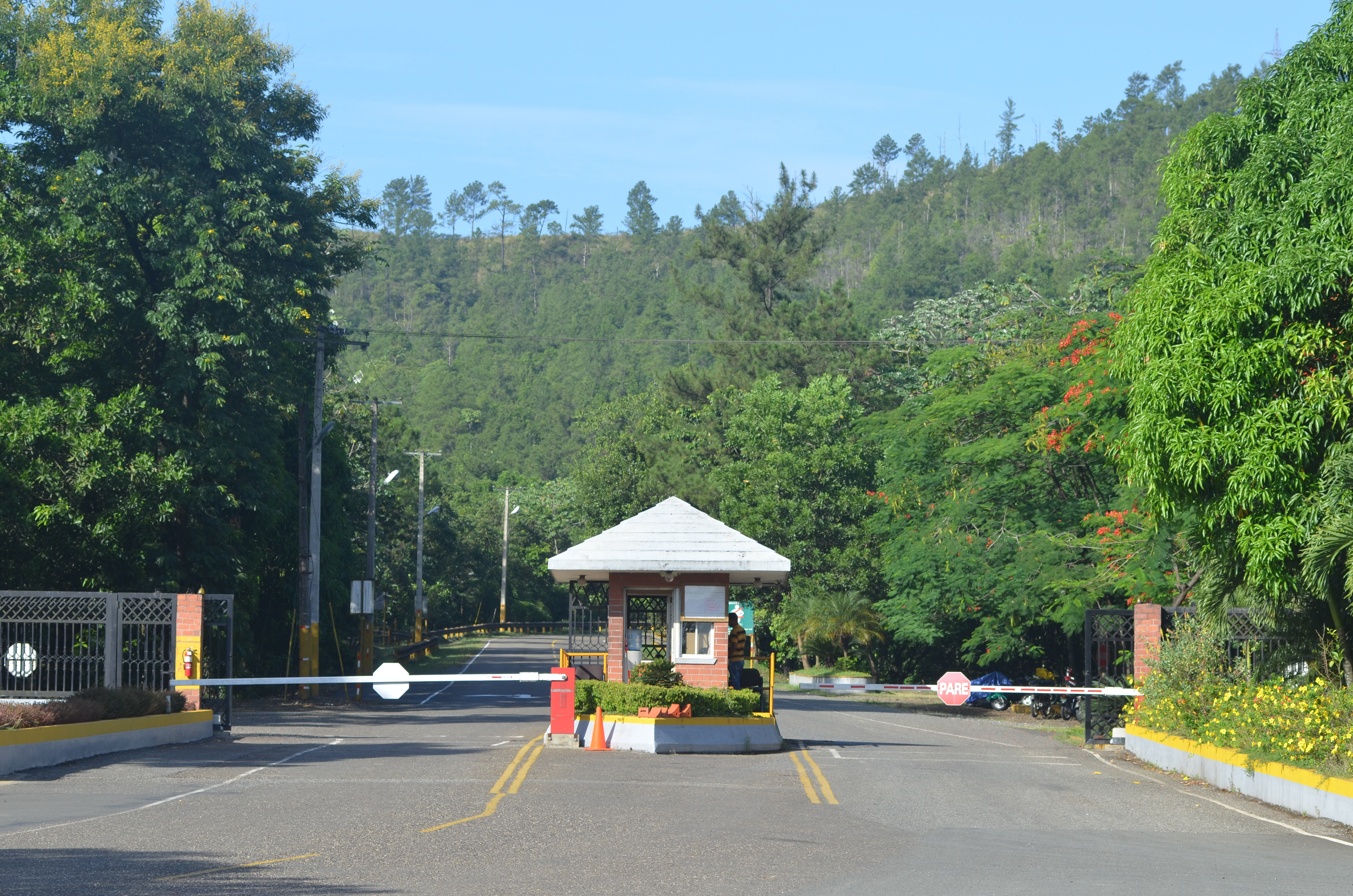
Entrance in Monsenor Nouel province

For comparison with the municipalities and municipal districts of other provinces see the list of municipalities and municipal districts of the Dominican Republic.

Name	Total population	Urban population	Rural population
Bonao	158,034	97,990	60,044
Maimón	18,655	14,069	4,586
Piedra Blanca	24,785	16,090	8,695
Monseñor Nouel province	201,474	120,754	80,720
