= 2014 NACRA Rugby Championship =

- Champions: USA Rugby South
- Runners-up: Guyana

The 2014 NACRA Rugby Championship, the seventh edition of the NACRA Rugby Championship, was a rugby union championship for Tier 3 North American and Caribbean teams. Pool play took place between 10 May and 28 June. A championship game followed in June, with Guyana defeating USA South in extra time. Mexico was promoted to the North Championship, with Bermuda moving down, due to the latter's inability to organize the promotion/relegation match. In the South division, Barbados defeated Curaçao to remain in the championship.

The championship is split between North and South zones, which each have a three-team championship and four-team cup. The winner of each championship play for the final, championship game, and a promotion/relegation game is played in each zone, between the winner of the cup, and the last place team of the championship.

Competition points are different from most rugby union tournaments: Two points are awarded for a win, one for a draw. There are also bonus points for scoring four tries and for losing within a margin of seven points or less.

== Teams ==
Fourteen teams took place in this year's tournament. They were seeded into two pools based on their regional rankings, in brackets.

North Zone	South Zone
Championship
USA South (1)	Trinidad and Tobago (2)
Cayman Islands (3)	Guyana (5)
Bermuda (4)	Barbados (6)
Cup
Bahamas (7)	Curaçao (10)
Jamaica (8)	British Virgin Islands (11)
Mexico (9)	Saint Lucia (12)
Turks and Caicos Islands (14)	Saint Vincent and the Grenadines (13)

== North Zone ==
=== North Zone Championship ===
Position	Team	Games				Points			Try bonus	Losing bonus	Table points
Position	Team	Played	Won	Drawn	Lost	For	Against	Difference	Try bonus	Losing bonus	Table points
1	USA South	2	2	0	0	67	36	+31	1	0	5
2	Cayman Islands	2	1	0	1	54	39	+15	1	1	4
3	Bermuda	2	0	0	2	9	57	−48	0	0	0

May 10, 2014	USA South	33 – 6	Bermuda	Life University, Marietta, Georgia, United States
16:00 EDT	Try: Ty Elkins (2); Ben Paul; Con: Lucas Baistrocchi (3/3); Pen: Lucas Baistrocchi (4/4)	Report	Pen: Tommy Edwards (2/2)

June 7, 2014	Bermuda	3 – 24	Cayman Islands	Bermuda National Stadium, Hamilton, Bermuda
16:00 ADT	Pen: Tommy Edwards (1/1)	Report	Try: Keswick Wright; Yohann Regnard; Con: Morgan Hayward (1/2); Pen: Morgan Hayward (3/4); Marco Du Plessis (1/1)

June 14, 2014	Cayman Islands	30-34	USA South	Truman Bodden Sports Complex, George Town, Cayman Islands
16:00 AST	Try: Morgan Hayward; Joel Clark; Marco Du Plessis; Pen: Morgan Hayward (2)	Report

=== North Zone Cup ===
Position	Team	Games				Points			Try bonus	Losing bonus	Table points
Position	Team	Played	Won	Drawn	Lost	For	Against	Difference	Try bonus	Losing bonus	Table points
1	Mexico	3	3	0	0	163	26	+137	3	0	9
2	Jamaica	3	2	0	1	35	50	−15	0	0	2
3	Bahamas	3	1	0	2	41	61	−20	0	1	2
4	Turks and Caicos Islands	3	0	0	3	17	119	−102	0	2	2

May 17, 2014	Bahamas	18 – 33	Mexico	Winton Rugby Centre, Nassau, Bahamas
16:00 EDT

May 17, 2014	Jamaica	10 – 6	Turks and Caicos Islands	Kingston, Jamaica
16:00 (UTC-5)

May 31, 2014	Turks and Caicos Islands	11 – 13	Bahamas	Meridan Field, Providenciales, Turks and Caicos Islands
16:00 EDT

June 7, 2014	Jamaica	8 – 34	Mexico	Ewarton, Jamaica
16:00 (UTC-5)	Try: Unknown (No. 11); Pen: Unknown	Report	Try: Simon Pierre (2); Fharid Samano (2); Mizael Loredo ? Penalty Try; Con: Lucas Collavizza (2/5)	Attendance: 350

June 28, 2014 (TBC)	Bahamas	10 - 17	Jamaica	Winton Rugby Centre, Nassau, Bahamas
16:00 EDT

June 28, 2014 (TBC)	Mexico	96 - 0	Turks and Caicos Islands	Mexico City, Mexico
16:00 CST

=== North Zone Championship relegation play-off ===
The North Zone Championship relegation play-off was played between the last-placed team of the North Zone Championship, Bermuda, and the winner of the North Zone Cup, Mexico. However, Bermuda was unable to organize the match, and Mexico moved to the championship by default.

== South Zone ==
=== South Zone Championship ===
Position	Team	Games				Points			Try bonus	Losing bonus	Table points
Position	Team	Played	Won	Drawn	Lost	For	Against	Difference	Try bonus	Losing bonus	Table points
1	Guyana	2	2	0	0	63	27	+36	1	0	5
2	Trinidad and Tobago	2	1	0	1	42	20	+22	1	1	4
3	Barbados	2	0	0	2	24	82	−58	0	0	0

May 17, 2014	Barbados	19 – 48	Guyana	Garrison Historic Area, St Michael, Barbados
16:00 AST

May 24, 2014	Trinidad and Tobago	34 – 5	Barbados	Port of Spain, Trinidad
16:00 AST	Try: James Phillip (3); Adam Fredericks; Joseph Quashie; Daryl Scott; Con: Aasan Lewis (2/6)	Report	Try: ?

June 7, 2014	Guyana	15 – 8	Trinidad and Tobago	Providence Stadium, Providence, Guyana
16:00 GYT (UTC-4)

=== South Zone Cup ===
Position	Team	Games				Points			Try bonus	Losing bonus	Table points
Position	Team	Played	Won	Drawn	Lost	For	Against	Difference	Try bonus	Losing bonus	Table points
1	Curaçao	3	3	0	0	117	31	+86	2	0	8
2	Saint Lucia	3	2	0	1	62	96	−34	2	0	6
3	Saint Vincent and the Grenadines	3	1	0	2	58	67	−5	1	2	5
4	British Virgin Islands	3	0	0	3	52	95	−43	0	1	1

May 10, 2014	Curaçao	56 – 7	Saint Lucia	Blue Bay Curaçao Golf and Beach Resort, Sint-Michiel, Curaçao
16:00 AST	Try: Rob Perry (3); James Brienburg (2); Jacco Eilers; Johan Faas; Mooi Thimas; Mark Verberg; Con: Mooi Thomas (4/9); Pen: Mooi Thomas	Report	Try: Werdel St Clair; Con: Colvis Samuel (1/1)

May 17, 2014	British Virgin Islands	22 – 24	Saint Vincent and the Grenadines	A. O. Shirley Recreation Ground, Road Town, British Virgin Islands
16:00 AST	Try: Grashaun Audain; Simon Knight; Donovan Staple; Con: Rory Thorton (2/3); Pen: Rory Thorton	Report	Try: Godfrey Matthews; Recardo Dallaway; Rasheed Campbell; Kemi Francois; Con: Phillip Alvis (2/4)

June 7, 2014	British Virgin Islands	18 – 29	Saint Lucia	A. O. Shirley Recreation Ground, Road Town, British Virgin Islands
16:00 AST

June 7, 2014	Saint Vincent and the Grenadines	12 – 19	Curaçao	Arnos Vale Stadium, Kingstown Saint Vincent and the Grenadines
16:00 AST

June 21, 2014	Curaçao	42 - 12	British Virgin Islands	Blue Bay Curaçao Golf and Beach Resort, Sint-Michiel, Curaçao
16:00 AST	Try: Curtleyson Martis (3); Tjakko Breuer (2); Con: ?/5; Pen: ? Drop: ?	Report	Try: Thomas Chapman; Rory Thorton; Con: Rory Thorton (1/2)

June 21, 2014	Saint Lucia	26 - 22	Saint Vincent and the Grenadines	Saint Lucia
16:00 AST	Try: Lenford Eugene (2); Ervin Joseph; Imran Williams; Con: Colvis Samuels (3/4)	Report	Try: Philip Alvis (2); Justin Joyles; George Kruger; Con: Philip Alvis (1/4)

=== South Zone Championship relegation play-off ===
The South Zone Championship relegation play-off was played between the last-placed team of the South Zone Championship, Barbados, and the winner of the South Zone Cup, Curaçao. The winner would play in the 2015 South Zone Championship.

Sept 20, 2014	Curaçao	0 - 29	Barbados	Blue Bay Curaçao Golf and Beach Resort, Sint-Michiel, Curaçao
TBC

== Final ==
The final will be played between the winner of the North Zone Championship, USA South, and the winner of the South Zone Championship, Guyana.

June 28, 2014	USA South	27 - 30 aet	Guyana	Life University, United States
16:00	Try: Matt Hughston 3, Brendan Smith; Con: Tom Snow 2 Pen: Tom Snow	Match Report	Try: Claudius Butts, Vallon Adams, Avery Corbin, Theodore Henry; Con: Ryan Gonsalves 2 Pen: Ryan Gonsalves 2 Cards: Avery Corbin (yellow card) 57' to 67'

== See also ==
- NACRA Rugby Championship
