= 2011 NACRA Rugby Championship =

2011 NACRA Rugby Championship was an international rugby union competition organised by the North America Caribbean Rugby Association (NACRA). The championship was contested by 12 teams divided into North and South zones, with the winners of the two zones meeting in the championship final.

Bermuda won the championship, defeating Guyana 11–0 in the final at the Guyana National Stadium in Providence, Guyana.

== Format ==
The 12 participating teams were divided into a North Zone and a South Zone. Four teams in each zone entered the first round, with the winners progressing to the second round. The second-round winners joined two teams that had entered at that stage to form a three-team round-robin in each zone. The winner of each zone advanced to the championship final.

== Teams ==
Twelve teams participated in the championship:

- (The Bahamas) Bahamas
- Barbados
- Bermuda
- British Virgin Islands
- Cayman Islands
- Guyana
- Jamaica
- Mexico
- Saint Lucia
- Saint Vincent and the Grenadines
- Trinidad and Tobago
- USA South

== North Zone ==
=== First round ===
The first round consisted of two knockout matches. Mexico defeated USA South 25–9 in Mexico, while the Cayman Islands defeated Jamaica 36–24 in Grand Cayman.

Date	Team	Result	Team	Venue
9 April 2011	Mexico	25–9	USA South	Burros Blancos Field, Mexico City
16 April 2011	Cayman Islands	36–24	Jamaica	South Sound Pitch, George Town

=== Second round ===
Mexico defeated the Cayman Islands 34–20 in Mexico City and advanced to the three-team North Zone round. Bermuda defeated the Bahamas 13–10 at home.

Date	Team	Result	Team	Venue
30 April 2011	Bermuda	13–10	(The Bahamas) Bahamas	North Field, Hamilton, Bermuda
15 May 2011	Mexico	34–20	Cayman Islands	Burros Blancos Field, Mexico City

The Bermuda–Bahamas match was played at the North Field in Bermuda, while the Mexico–Cayman Islands match was played at Burros Blancos Field in Zacatenco, Mexico City.

=== Final round ===
The final round was contested by Bermuda, the Bahamas and Mexico. Bermuda defeated both opponents and won the North Zone.

Date	Team	Result	Team	Venue
30 April 2011	Bermuda	13–10	(The Bahamas) Bahamas	North Field, Hamilton, Bermuda
28 May 2011	(The Bahamas) Bahamas	17–12	Mexico	Winton Rugby Centre, Nassau
5 June 2011	Mexico	7–26	Bermuda	Burros Blancos Field, Mexico City

The Bahamas defeated Mexico 17–12 at the Winton Rugby Centre in Nassau, while Bermuda defeated Mexico 26–7 in Mexico City to secure first place in the zone.

Pos	Team	Pld	W	D	L	PF	PA	PD	Pts
1	Bermuda	2	2	0	0	39	17	+22	6
2	(The Bahamas) Bahamas	2	1	0	1	27	25	+2	3
3	Mexico	2	0	0	2	19	43	−24	0

== South Zone ==
=== First round ===
British Virgin Islands defeated Saint Vincent and the Grenadines 25–13, while Barbados defeated Saint Lucia 31–12. The two winners advanced to the second round.

Date	Team	Result	Team	Venue
9 April 2011	Saint Vincent and the Grenadines	13–25	British Virgin Islands	Arnos Vale Ground, Kingstown
16 April 2011	Barbados	31–12	Saint Lucia	Garrison Savannah, Bridgetown

The opening round was played on 9 and 16 April, with British Virgin Islands defeating Saint Vincent and the Grenadines and Barbados defeating Saint Lucia.

=== Second round ===
Barbados defeated British Virgin Islands 19–13 at the A. O. Shirley Ground in Tortola and advanced to the South Zone final round.

Date	Team	Result	Team	Venue
30 April 2011	British Virgin Islands	13–19	Barbados	A. O. Shirley Ground, Road Town

=== Final round ===
The South Zone final round consisted of Trinidad and Tobago, Guyana and Barbados. Trinidad and Tobago defeated Barbados 17–10, Guyana defeated Trinidad and Tobago 22–20, and Guyana defeated Barbados 20–7 to win the South Zone.

Date	Team	Result	Team	Venue
21 May 2011	Barbados	10–17	Trinidad and Tobago	Garrison Savannah, Bridgetown
28 May 2011	Trinidad and Tobago	20–22	Guyana	St. Mary's Ground, Port of Spain
11 June 2011	Guyana	20–7	Barbados	Guyana National Stadium, Providence, Guyana

Trinidad and Tobago's 17–10 victory over Barbados was played at the Garrison Savannah in Bridgetown.

Guyana defeated Trinidad and Tobago 22–20 in Port of Spain. Contemporary reporting identifies the venue as the St. Mary's College ground.

Guyana then defeated Barbados 20–7 at the Guyana National Stadium to win the South Zone.

Pos	Team	Pld	W	D	L	PF	PA	PD	Pts
1	Guyana	2	2	0	0	42	27	+15	6
2	Trinidad and Tobago	2	1	0	1	37	32	+5	3
3	Barbados	2	0	0	2	17	37	−20	0

== Final ==
The North Zone champions Bermuda faced South Zone champions Guyana in the championship final on 22 June 2011. The match was played at the Guyana National Stadium in Providence, Guyana.

Date	Team	Result	Team	Venue
22 June 2011	Guyana	0–11	Bermuda	Guyana National Stadium, Providence, Guyana

Bermuda won the championship by defeating Guyana 11–0. Contemporary reporting described Bermuda as the North Zone champion and Guyana as the South Zone champion before the final. The final was Bermuda's first NACRA men's 15-a-side championship title.

== See also ==
- Rugby Americas North
- Rugby union in the Caribbean
- Bermuda national rugby union team
- Guyana national rugby union team
