= 2001 NACRA Rugby Championship =

Tournament details
- Host: Cayman Islands
- Date: 20–24 November 2001
- Countries: Bahamas; Barbados; Bermuda; Cayman Islands; Guyana; Jamaica; Saint Lucia; Trinidad and Tobago

Final positions
- Champions: Trinidad and Tobago
- Runner-up: Bermuda

Tournament statistics
- Matches played: 11

The 2001 NACRA Rugby Championship was a rugby union championship for Tier 3 North American and Caribbean teams, which took place between 20 and 24 November 2001.

The tournament was also valid as the first round of Americas qualification for 2003 Rugby World Cup.

The championship was held as single-elimination tournament. The tournament was won by Trinidad and Tobago who beat Bermuda in the finals.

== First round ==
20 November 2001

Bermuda	6 - 0	Saint Lucia

FORFAIT

20 November 2001

Trinidad and Tobago	51 - 5	Jamaica

Grand Cayman

20 November 2001

Cayman Islands	32 - 13	Guyana

Grand Cayman

20 November 2001

Bahamas	18 - 25	Barbados

Grand Cayman

== Semifinals ==
=== Gold (1st-4th places) ===
22 November 2001

Cayman Islands	8 - 12	Trinidad and Tobago

Grand Cayman

22 November 2001

Bermuda	13 - 5	Barbados

Grand Cayman

=== Plate (5th-8th places) ===
22 November 2001

Bahamas	34 - 12	Cayman B

Grand Cayman

22 November 2001

Jamaica	18 - 15	Guyana

Grand Cayman

== Finals ==
=== 5th place final ===
24 November 2001

Bahamas	13 - 5	Jamaica

Grand Cayman

=== 3rd place final ===
24 November 2001

Cayman Islands	14 - 17	Barbados

Grand Cayman

=== 1st place final ===
24 November 2001

Trinidad and Tobago	23 - 12	Bermuda

Grand Cayman

== See also ==
- NACRA Rugby Championship
