= 2005 NACRA Rugby Championship =

- Date: 28 May– 1 October 2005
- Countries: Bahamas; Barbados; Bermuda; Cayman Islands; Guyana; Jamaica; Saint Lucia; Saint Vincent and the Grenadines; Trinidad and Tobago

Final positions
- Champions: Barbados
- Runner-up: Bahamas

Tournament statistics
- Matches played: 14

The 2005 NACRA Rugby Championship was a rugby union championship for Tier 3 North American and Caribbean teams, and took place between May and October 2005.

The tournament was also valid as the first round of Americas qualification for 2007 Rugby World Cup.

The championship was split between North and South, with the winner of each division playing in a final game.

The tournament was won by Barbados, which beat the Bahamas in the finals.

== North Zone ==
5 June 2005

Jamaica	10 - 10	Bermuda

Nassau

5 June 2005

Bahamas	23 - 12	Cayman Islands

Nassau

8 June 2005

Bahamas	24 - 15	Bermuda

Nassau

8 June 2005

Cayman Islands	18 - 8	Jamaica

Nassau

11 June 2005

Cayman Islands	12 - 6	Bermuda

Nassau

11 June 2005

Jamaica	5 - 3	Bahamas

Nassau

Place	Nation	Games				Points			Table points
Place	Nation	Played	Won	Drawn	Lost	For	Against	Difference	Table points
1	Bahamas	3	2	0	1	50	32	+18	4
2	Cayman Islands	3	2	0	1	42	37	+5	4
3	Jamaica	3	1	1	1	23	31	-8	3
4	Bermuda	3	0	1	2	31	46	-15	1

== South ==
=== Preliminary ===
28 May 2005

Saint Lucia	36 - 25	Saint Vincent and the Grenadines

Castries

=== Pool ===
8 August 2005

Trinidad and Tobago	81 - 8	Saint Lucia

Georgetown

8 August 2005

Barbados	27 - 17	Guyana

Georgetown

10 August 2005

Guyana	97 - 0	Saint Lucia

Georgetown

10 August 2005

Barbados	25 - 13	Trinidad and Tobago

Georgetown

13 August 2005

Guyana	29 - 21	Trinidad and Tobago

Georgetown

13 August 2005

Barbados	81 - 0	Saint Lucia

Georgetown

Place	Nation	Games				Points			Table points
Place	Nation	Played	Won	Drawn	Lost	For	Against	Difference	Table points
1	Barbados	3	3	0	0	133	30	+103	6
2	Guyana	3	2	0	1	143	48	+95	4
3	Trinidad and Tobago	3	1	0	2	115	62	-53	2
4	Saint Lucia	3	0	0	3	8	259	-251	0

== Final ==
1 October 2005

Barbados	52 - 3	Bahamas

Port of Spain

== See also ==
- NACRA Rugby Championship
