= 2025 Rugby Americas North Championship =

- Date: 3 May - 21 June 2025
- Countries: Barbados; Jamaica; Mexico; Trinidad and Tobago

Tournament statistics
- Matches played: 3
- Website: www.rugbyamericasnorth.com

The 2025 Rugby Americas North Championship is the 27th edition of the Rugby Americas North Championship, a rugby union championship for Tier 3 North American and Caribbean teams.

This is the first edition of the tournament since the COVID-19 pandemic. The tournament consists of two semi-finals and a final with the participants of the semi-finals determined by the results of a series of nine tests held in 2024.

== Regional Matches ==
27 April 2024

Trinidad and Tobago	23–24	Guyana
	Report

Hasely Crawford Stadium, Port of Spain, Guyana

18 May 2024

Jamaica	19–14	Bermuda
	Report

Bramwell Clarke Sports Complex, Ewarton, Jamaica

18 May 2024

Barbados	80–0	Saint Vincent and the Grenadines
	Report

Garrison Savannah, Garrison Historic Area, Barbados

31 May 2024

Cayman Islands	10–20	Mexico
	Report

Truman Bodden Stadium, George Town, Cayman Islands
Referee: Tim Lew (USA)

1 June 2024

Bermuda	35–5	Bahamas
	Report

Bermuda National Stadium, Devonshire Parish

8 June 2024

Saint Lucia	7–93	Barbados
	Report

Philip Marcellin Grounds, Vieux-Fort, St. Lucia

22 June 2024

Guyana	3–26	Trinidad and Tobago
	Report

Hasley Crawford Stadium, Georgetown, Guyana

29 June 2024

Bahamas	14–48	Jamaica
	Report

Grand Bahama Sports Complex, Freeport, The Bahamas

7 December 2024

Mexico	45–14	Cayman Islands
	Report

Deportivo Alfredo Harp Helú, Mexico City

== Semi-Finals ==
=== North Semi-Final ===
3 May 2025

Mexico	37–22	Jamaica
	Report

Estadio Tapatio Mendez, Mexico City

=== South Semi-Final ===
31 May 2025

Trinidad and Tobago	29–28	Barbados
	Report

Manny Ramjohn Stadium, San Fernando

== Final ==
21 June 2025

Mexico	45–14	Trinidad and Tobago
	Report

Mexico City
