= Rugby Americas North =

Administrative body for rugby union in North America and the Caribbean

- Abbreviation: RAN
- Established: March 2001; 25 years ago (as NAWIRA); 2010 (as NACRA); 2016
- Type: Sports organisation
- Headquarters: Tortola, British Virgin Islands
- Region served: Northern America and the Caribbean (Note: Includes Guyana and French Guiana.)
- Members: 19 member unions
- Official language: English; French; Spanish
- President: Araba Chintoh
- Treasurer: Pablo Septién
- Vice President: Paul Santinelli
- Main organ: Board of Directors
- Parent organization: World Rugby
- Website: rugbyamericasnorth.com
- Formerly called: North America and West Indies Rugby Association (2001–2008); North America Caribbean Rugby Association (2009–2014)

Rugby Americas North (RAN) is the governing body for rugby union in the North American continental region. Rugby Americas North operates under the authority of World Rugby, and is one of six regional unions represented within it.

Prior to 2016, the organisation was known as NACRA – the North America Caribbean Rugby Association. The preceding body before 2010 was NAWIRA – the North America and West Indies Rugby Association.

The main objective of RAN is the promotion and development of rugby in North America and the Caribbean. The association unveiled a four-year plan during the 2011 Annual General Meeting to grow rugby within its membership unions through promotion, media output and competition.

World Rugby's 51-member executive council includes two seats for RAN representatives, as well as one each for the Canadian and USA Rugby unions.

== Competitions ==
RAN oversees regional competitions, such as regional qualifiers for Pan Am Games and Rugby World Cups including:

Senior

- RAN Sevens
- RAN Women's Sevens
- RAN Rugby Championship
- RAN Women's Rugby Championship

Youth

- RAN Under-19 Championship

== Governance ==
RAN is governed by a board of five executives. The United States, Canada and Mexico are fixed representatives, while the Caribbean countries elect two nations for delegation. In November 2021 RAN announced changes to its executive committee following its 2021 Annual General Meeting in Miami. George Nicholson was appointed as the new president and Dr. Araba Chintoh and Miguel Carner as vice presidents. Nicholson died in April 2024.

== Player registration ==
Former NACRA logo.

As of 2010, there were 128,828 rugby players within North America: with the largest number of players from:

1. United States (88,151)
2. Canada (23,853)
3. Trinidad and Tobago (5,060)
4. Mexico (3,454)

As of 2016, RAN reported 160,769 total registered players and 1,595,565 non-registered players.

1. USA – 119,682
2. Canada – 27,512
3. Mexico – 6,168
4. Martinique – 3,500
5. St. Vincent & The Grenadines – 1,806
6. Jamaica – 1,518
7. Trinidad & Tobago – 1,403
8. Bermuda – 794
9. Dominican Republic – 600
10. Bahamas – 529
11. Guyana – 522
12. Barbados – 425
13. Cayman – 410
14. St. Lucia – 292
15. Turks and Caicos – 200
16. British Virgin Islands – 117
17. Curacao – 104

As of the 2019 Rugby Americas North Review there were 134,300 participants reported, 69,500 males and 65,000 females.

== Member unions ==
As of August 2024 Rugby Americas North has 13 full members and 4 associate members and 2 recognized regional development unions:

- (The Bahamas) Bahamas
- Barbados
- Bermuda
- (British Virgin Islands) British Virgin Islands
- Canada
- (Cayman Islands) Cayman Islands
- Curaçao ^{a}
- Dominican Republic ^{a}
- French Guiana ^{a}^{,}^{b}
- Guadeloupe ^{b}
- Guyana
- Jamaica
- Martinique ^{a}^{,}^{b}
- Mexico
- (Saint Lucia) St. Lucia
- (Saint Vincent and the Grenadines) St. Vincent & the Grenadines
- (Trinidad and Tobago) Trinidad and Tobago
- (Turks and Caicos Islands) Turks and Caicos Islands ^{a}
- United States

Regional unions (including former affiliates) without current RAN recognition:

- (Saint Kitts and Nevis) St. Kitts and Nevis

Notes:

^a Denotes associate member of RAN not affiliated with World Rugby.

^b The governing body is the French Rugby Federation which has territorial committees for overseas departments and territories.

== World Rugby Rankings ==
Men's World Rugby Rankings (as of 2 January 2023)
North America*	World Rugby	+/-	National Team	Points
1	19	Steady	United States	65.92
2	23	Steady	Canada	60.46
3	51	▼8	Mexico	45.83
4	52	Steady	Trinidad and Tobago	45.51
5	54	▲4	Cayman Islands	44.37
6	58	▼1	Guyana	42.86
7	67	Steady	Jamaica	39
8	68	Steady	Bermuda	38.91
9	81	Steady	Saint Vincent and the Grenadines	34.91
10	83	Steady	Barbados	34.72
11	99	Steady	Bahamas	27.76
*Local rankings based on World Rugby ranking points

Women's World Rugby Rankings (as of 2 January 2023)
North America*	World Rugby	+/-	National Team	Points
1	4	Steady	Canada	84.22
2	7	Steady	United States	76.78
3	23	Steady	Trinidad and Tobago	46.45
4	34	Steady	Jamaica	40.52
5	38	Steady	Guyana	39.63
6	53	Steady	Cayman Islands	34.95
7	59	Steady	Barbados	30.06
8	60	Steady	Saint Vincent and the Grenadines	28.71
9	61	Steady	Bahamas	27.67
*Local rankings based on World Rugby ranking points

== World Cup qualifying ==
Rugby Americas North nations participate in qualifying tournaments for the Rugby World Cup every four years. Two Rugby Americas North nations –Canada and United States – have qualified to play in Rugby World Cups.

Edition	Automatically qualified	Qualified via competition	Qualified via repechage	Eliminated in repechage	Eliminated at final stage	Eliminated at second stage	Eliminated at first stage
1987	Canada; United States	—N/a	—N/a	—N/a	—N/a	—N/a	—N/a
1991	—N/a	Canada; United States	—N/a	—N/a	—N/a	—N/a	—N/a
1995	Canada	—N/a	—N/a	—N/a	United States	—N/a	Bermuda
1999	—N/a	Canada; United States	—N/a	—N/a	—N/a	—N/a	Trinidad and Tobago; Guyana; Bermuda; Bahamas; Barbados
2003	—N/a	Canada	United States	—N/a	—N/a	Trinidad and Tobago	Bermuda; Saint Lucia; Barbados; Bahamas; Cayman Islands; Guyana; Jamaica
2007	—N/a	Canada; United States	—N/a	—N/a	—N/a	Barbados	Guyana; Trinidad and Tobago; Saint Lucia; Bahamas; Cayman Islands; Jamaica; Bermuda; Saint Vincent and the Grenadines
2011	—N/a	Canada; United States	—N/a	—N/a	—N/a	Trinidad and Tobago	Barbados; Guyana; Cayman Islands; Bahamas; Jamaica; Bermuda; Mexico; Saint Vincent and the Grenadines
2015	—N/a	Canada; United States	—N/a	—N/a	—N/a	Bermuda	Trinidad and Tobago; Guyana; Cayman Islands; Mexico; Saint Vincent and the Grenadines; Barbados; Jamaica; Bahamas
2019	—N/a	Canada; United States	—N/a	—N/a	—N/a	—N/a	Saint Vincent and the Grenadines; Cayman Islands; Bermuda; Bahamas; Trinidad and Tobago; Barbados; Jamaica; Guyana; Mexico
2023	—N/a	—N/a	—N/a	United States	Canada	—N/a	—N/a
2027	—N/a	Canada; United States	—N/a	—N/a	—N/a	—N/a	—N/a

== See also ==
- World Rugby
- Sudamérica Rugby
- Americas Rugby Championship
