= 2017 Rugby Americas North Championship =

- Date: 6 May - 29 July
- Countries: Bahamas; Barbados; Bermuda; Cayman Islands; Dominican Republic; Guyana; Mexico; Trinidad and Tobago; Turks and Caicos Islands; United States

Final positions
- Champions: United States (2nd title)

Tournament statistics
- Matches played: 12
- Tries scored: 98 (8.17 per match)
- Website: www.rugbyamericasnorth.com

The 2017 Rugby Americas North Championship, the 10th edition of the tournament, is a rugby union championship for Tier 3 North American and Caribbean teams. Pool play takes place between 22 April and 1 July. With the 2017 edition not being part of World Cup qualifying, non World Rugby full member teams return to take part in the tournament.

The North Zone returns to the 2015 format with a higher Championship level and a lower Cup level, however the South Zone has been reduced to one level of three teams.

== Teams ==
North Zone	South Zone
Championship
Bermuda	Guyana
Cayman Islands	Trinidad and Tobago
Mexico	Barbados
(United States) USA South
Cup
Bahamas
Dominican Republic
Turks and Caicos Islands

Notable changes from last year: Turks and Caicos Islands and USA South return after being absent from the 2016 tournament. 2016 participants Jamaica and St. Vincent and the Grenadines did not enter. Dominican Republic will compete for the first time.

Format:Each division plays a single round robin. After pool play is complete, the winners play in the final on July 1.

It was originally planned for Barbados and Curaçao to play a qualifier on April 22 to decide the third team in the South Zone. However, it was cancelled and Barbados was added to the main tournament.

== North Zone ==
=== Championship ===
Rank	Team	Games				Points			Try Bonus	Losing Bonus	Table Points
Rank	Team	Played	Won	Drawn	Lost	For	Against	Diff	Try Bonus	Losing Bonus	Table Points
1	(United States) USA South	3	2	0	1	68	41	+27	2	1	11
2	Mexico	3	2	0	1	112	75	+37	1	0	9
3	Cayman Islands	3	2	0	1	72	71	+1	1	0	9
4	Bermuda	3	0	0	3	22	87	-65	0	0	0

Matches

13 May 2017	Bermuda	7-59	Mexico
	Try: Corey Boyce 9'; Con: Dan Cole 10'; Cards: Tom Healy (yellow card) 19' to 29'	Report	Try: Franco Guerrero 4', 66', 82'; Luis Arredondo 12', 26'; Penalty Try 19'; Fharid Samano 32'; Andrés Rodríguez 44'; Pascal Nadaud del Castillo 69'; Con: Agustín Sánchez 13', 27', 33', 45', 70', 83'	Referee: (United States) Mike O'Brien

14 May 2017	USA South (United States)	39-5	Cayman Islands	Life University, Marietta, United States
	Try: Shawn Riley 9'; John Bryant 22'; David Coleman 46'; Zach Blalock 62'; Cormac Kenan 66'; Hein Erasmus 79'; Con: Zach Miller 23'; Adam Channel 47', 62'; Pen: Zach Miller 2'	Report	Try: Wight 12'; Cards: Blair (yellow card) 38' to 48'

27 May 2017	Mexico	36-29	(United States) USA South	Estadio Cuauhtémoc, Puebla City, Mexico
	Try: Loredo 14'; Andrés Rodriguez 22', 73'; Con: Agustin Sanchez (2/2) 15', 23'; Miguel Carner 74'; Pen: Agustin Sanchez (2/2) 19', 27'; Franco Guerrero (1/1) 29'; Miguel Carner (2/2) 55', 71'; Cards: Jose Reyes (yellow card) 49' to 59'; Franco Guerrero (yellow card) 59' to 69'; Marcos Flegmann (yellow card) 61' to 71'	Report	Try: Hein Erasmus 9'; Robert Trey Eason 50'; Zach Miller 56'; Matt Hughston 78'; Con: Adam Channel (3/4) 10', 57', 79'; Pen: Adam Channel (1/1) 36'; Cards: Marcus Satavu (yellow card) 19' to 29'	Attendance: 3500; Referee: (Canada) Robin Kaluzniak

3 June 2017	Bermuda	15-28	Cayman Islands
	Try: Conor McGlynn 47'; Dan Cole 54'; Darren Richardson 74'; Cards: Conor McGlynn (yellow card) 28' to 38'; Mikey Williams (yellow card) 68' to 78'	Report	Try: David Acutt 7'; Morgan Shelver 21'; Venasio Tokatokavanua 43'; Con: Morgan Hayward 10', 22'; Pen: Morgan Hayward 29', 62'; Cards: Venasio Tokatokavanua (yellow card) 72' to 80'

17 June 2017	USA South (United States)	walkover	Bermuda	Old White Rugby Club, Atlanta, United States
		Report

17 June 2017	Cayman Islands	39-17	Mexico	Truman Bodden Complex, George Town, Cayman Islands
	Try: Jonny Gibson 25'; Ben Blair 40', 43'; Penalty Try 72'; Joseph Westin 77'; Con: Morgan Hayward 25'; Morgan Shelver 44', 78'; Pen: Morgan Hayward 10'; Morgan Shelver 58'	Report	Try: Luis Arredondo 2'; Fharid Samano 17', 36'; Con: Miguel Carner 18'	Attendance: 800; Referee: (United States) Josh Houston

=== Cup ===
Rank	Team	Games				Points			Try Bonus	Losing Bonus	Table Points
Rank	Team	Played	Won	Drawn	Lost	For	Against	Diff	Try Bonus	Losing Bonus	Table Points
1	Turks and Caicos Islands	2	2	0	0	50	34	+16	1	0	9
2	Bahamas	2	1	0	1	61	31	+30	1	1	6
3	Dominican Republic	2	0	0	2	20	66	-46	0	0	0

Matches

6 May 2017	Turks and Caicos Islands	24-15	Dominican Republic	Meridian Field, Providenciales, Turks and Caicos Islands
	Try: Ryan 21'; Hodgekins 35'; Joseph 6'; Pen: Butler 49', 71', 79'	Report	Try: Daniel Figueroa 60'; Michael Guerrero Gomez 65'; Con: Arnold Figueroa 66'; Pen: Arnold Figueroa 28'; Cards: Luis David Alvarez Nuñez (yellow card) 18' to 28'

20 May 2017	Bahamas	19-26	Turks and Caicos Islands	Winton Rugby Centre, Nassau, Bahamas
	Try: Giovanni Rolle 50'; Con: Conner Albury 51'; Pen: Conner Albury 1', 31', 44', 71'	Report	Try: Kadis Simmons 27', 62'; Peter Savory 42'; Gearing 53'; Con: Gareth Butler 43', 54', 63'; Cards: Bendy Francis (yellow card) 44' to 54'

3 June 2017	Dominican Republic	5-42	Bahamas	Centro Olímpico Juan Pablo Duarte, Santo Domingo, Dominican Republic
	Try: Andres Pepin 71'	Report	Try: Rogers 17'; Isaacs 35', 60'; Charlton 38'; Deveaux 68'; Dan Woodside 76'; Con: Conner Albury 39', 68'; Pen: Conner Albury 3'; Charlton 52'; Cards: Conner Albury (yellow card) 43' to 53'

== South Zone ==
Rank	Team	Games				Points			Try Bonus	Losing Bonus	Table Points
Rank	Team	Played	Won	Drawn	Lost	For	Against	Diff	Try Bonus	Losing Bonus	Table Points
1	Guyana	2	2	0	0	58	43	+15	1	0	9
2	Trinidad and Tobago	2	1	0	1	53	40	+13	1	1	6
3	Barbados	2	0	0	2	42	70	-28	0	0	0

Matches

13 May 2017	Barbados	26-34	Guyana	Garrison Savannah Racetrack, Bridgetown, Barbados
	Try: Mikyle Walcott 13'; Jeren Clarke 74', 79'; Con: Jake Caddy 14'; Pen: Jake Caddy 19', 42', 54'	Report	Try: Richard Staglon 31', 37', 51'; Vallon Adams 46', 70'; Ahmad Isaacs 55'; Con: Rickford Cummings 56', 71'	Referee: (Cayman Islands) Justin Colgan

27 May 2017	Trinidad and Tobago	36-16	Barbados
	Try: Jamaal Stewart 26', 57'; Leon Pantor 37'; Gordon Dalgliesh 42'; Samuel Roberts 61'; Shakeel Dyte 79'; Con: Karlon Alexander (0/6); Pen: Karlon Alexander (2/2) 8', 17'	Report	Try: Marlo Sandiford 49'; Jeren Clarke 74'; Con: Kevin Carter (0/1); Mikyle Walcott (0/1); Pen: Kevin Carter 13'; Drop: Kevin Carter 11'

10 June 2017	Guyana	24-17	Trinidad and Tobago	Providence Stadium, Providence, Guyana
	Try: Richard Staglon 16'; Avery Corbin 19', 78'; Ahmad Isaacs 59'; Con: Ryan Gonsalves (2/4) 19', 78'	Report	Try: James Phillips 9'; Karlon Alexander 73'; Samuel Roberts 80+4'; Con: Karlon Alexander (0/2); Johnson Alleyne 73'; Pen: Karlon Alexander (0/1); Leon Pantor (0/1)

== Championship playoff ==
29 July 2017	Guyana	19-23	(United States) USA South	Providence Stadium, Providence, Guyana
	Try: Patrick King; Osie McKenzie (2); Con: Allen Crawford; Godfrey Broomes	Report	Try: Hein Erasmus; Wayne Chermely; Jordan Gunderson; Con: Zach Miller; Pen: Zach Miller (2)
