= Rugby Americas North Championship =

- Current season, competition or edition: 2025 Rugby Americas North Championship
- Sport: Rugby union
- Founded: 2001
- No. of teams: 13
- Continent: North America
- Most recent champion: Mexico (2nd title) (2025)
- Most titles: Bermuda (10 titles)

The Rugby Americas North Championship, known before the 2016 edition as the NACRA Rugby Championship, is a championship for Tier 3 members of Rugby Americas North in men's 15-a-side rugby union. The United States and Canada, the two tier 2 sides in the North American region, take part in the Rugby Americas Championship, the "Americas 6 Nations", instead but a team representing the United States South regional association, USA South do take part.

Historically, the format of the tournament contained both a geographical and divisional element with promotion and relegation. All teams were split between North and South. Within that geographical split, teams were then split into the Championship (higher division) and the Cup (lower division). The highest placed team in each Cup played the bottom team in their respective Championship for promotion.

Starting in 2026, the format is scheduled to be revised with three tiers of competition, which will be included in the qualification process for the Rugby World Cup.

The current format of the tournament contains both a geographical and divisional element with promotion and relegation. All the teams are split between the North and South. Within that geographical split, teams are then split into the Championship (higher division) and the Cup (lower division). The highest placed team in each Cup plays the bottom team in their respective Championship for promotion. As of 2017, the Southern region does not have a Cup division.

Finally, the winner of the North championship plays the winner of the South championship in the RAN Championship final to decide the winner of the overall tournament.

== Champions ==
Year	Winner	Score	Runner-up	Refs
1966	Guyana	round robin	Trinidad and Tobago	
1967	Trinidad and Tobago	round robin	Barbados	
1969	Jamaica	round robin	Bahamas	
1971	Guyana	round robin	Trinidad and Tobago	
1973	Trinidad and Tobago	round robin	Barbados	
1975	Jamaica	round robin	Barbados	
1977	Bermuda	round robin	Martinique	
1979	Bermuda	round robin		
1981	Bermuda	round robin		
1983	Trinidad and Tobago	round robin		
1985	Trinidad and Tobago	round robin		
1987	Martinique	round robin		
1992	Bermuda	round robin		
1993		round robin		
1994	Bermuda	round robin		
1996	Bermuda	29–8	Trinidad and Tobago	
1997	Trinidad and Tobago	31–14	Cayman Islands	
1998	Bermuda	round robin	Trinidad and Tobago	
1999	Trinidad and Tobago; Cayman Islands	round robin		
2001	Trinidad and Tobago	23–12	Bermuda	
2005	Barbados	52–3	Bahamas	
2008	Trinidad and Tobago	40–24	Guyana	
2011	Bermuda	11–0	Guyana	
2012	Bermuda	18–0	Guyana	
2013	(United States) USA South	26–18	Trinidad and Tobago	
2014	Guyana	30–27	(United States) USA South	
2015	Trinidad and Tobago	30–16	Mexico	
2016	Mexico	32–3	Guyana	
2017	(United States) USA South	23–19	Guyana	
2018	(United States) USA South	round robin	Cayman Islands	
2019	Bermuda	33–10	Guadeloupe	
2025	Mexico	45–14	Trinidad and Tobago	

=== Statistics by team ===
Team	Titles	Years won
Bermuda	10	1977, 1979, 1981, 1992, 1994, 1996, 1998, 2011, 2012, 2019
Trinidad and Tobago	9	1967, 1973, 1983, 1985, 1997, 1999*, 2001, 2008, 2015
Guyana	3	1966, 1971, 2014
(United States) USA South	3	2013, 2017, 2018
Jamaica	2	1969, 1975
Mexico	2	2016, 2025
Barbados	1	2005
Cayman Islands	1	1999*
Martinique	1	1987
*Shared title
