= 2011 Rugby World Cup – Americas qualification =

Rugby international competition

Tournament details
- Dates: 29 March 2008 – 21 November 2009
- No. of nations: 18

Tournament statistics
- Matches played: 26

In the American Region for Rugby World Cup Qualifying, two teams, Canada and USA, qualified directly to the world cup and the third place, Uruguay, entered a playoff against the third place European team and the second place African and Asian teams.

The qualification process started with regional qualification tournaments. First a Caribbean tournament in the Cayman Islands during April 2008, was won by Trinidad and Tobago. South America's Second Division 2008 South American Rugby (division B) was the next tournament to take place. Brazil won on the final day in Paraguay.

The two regional champions advanced to a playoff to decide who would face Uruguay and Chile in Round 3A. Brazil won both legs of the two-match series for the right to participate in the 2009 South American Rugby Championship A Division, which was won by Uruguay. Uruguay then faced the United States to determine the Americas 2 seed.

On July 11, 2009, Canada claimed the Americas 1 seed, making them the first team to qualify for the 2011 Rugby World Cup. The USA followed on November 21 to claim the Americas 2 seed, sending Uruguay to the playoffs for the final place.

18 teams participated in the qualifying process. For 2007 there were 19. Changes in participation levels were due to Argentina earning a spot in the 2011 tournament with their performance in 2007, Saint Lucia not participating, and Mexico making their Rugby World Cup qualifying debut.

== Round 1A (Caribbean Regional Tournament) - April 2008 ==
The Caribbean Regional Championships held in the Cayman Islands was the first Qualifying event for the Rugby World Cup 2011. The Tournament included the nine eligible IRB members from the Caribbean & Central America. Mexico was competing in their first major international competition as one of the IRB's newest members. The Mexicans faced Saint Vincent and the Grenadines in a preliminary qualifying match to determine the final eight. The match was played at the Arnos Vale Ground in Kingstown, Saint Vincent and the Grenadines. In addition to determining a champion, the tournament played out each final position. The tournament was won by Trinidad and Tobago who advanced to Round 2 of the qualifying process. The main tournament was hosted by the Cayman Islands, with all matches being played at Truman Bodden Stadium in George Town. Attendance at this tournament varied throughout, but the maximum attendance was calculated at 1,395 during the final.

Teams

- Barbados
- Guyana
- Cayman Islands
- Trinidad and Tobago
- Bahamas
- Jamaica
- Bermuda
- Mexico
- Saint Vincent and the Grenadines (Team eliminated in the preliminary round)

Quarter-finals
April 20, 2008
Trinidad and Tobago	39
Cayman Islands	12
April 20, 2008
Barbados	21
Mexico	20
April 20, 2008
Guyana	10
Jamaica	3
April 20, 2008
Bermuda	29
Bahamas	13

Semi-finals
April 23, 2008
Trinidad and Tobago	56
Barbados	0
April 23, 2008
Guyana	25
Bermuda	13

Final
April 26, 2008
Trinidad and Tobago	40
Guyana	24
3rd-Place final
April 26, 2008
Bermuda	17
Barbados	6

Semi-finals
April 23, 2008
Cayman Islands	6
Mexico	13
April 23, 2008
Jamaica	12
Bahamas	19

Final
April 26, 2008
Mexico	17
Bahamas	23
3rd-Place final
April 26, 2008
Cayman Islands	11
Jamaica	10

2008 Caribbean Regional Championships
Date	Home	Score	Away	Venue	Referee
Preliminary Round
29-Mar-2008	Saint Vincent and the Grenadines	7 - 47	Mexico	Arnos Vale Ground, Kingstown	N/A
1st Round
20-Apr-2008	Cayman Islands	12 - 39	Trinidad and Tobago	Truman Bodden Stadium, George Town	Tony Spreadbury (England)
20-Apr-2008	Guyana	10 - 3	Jamaica	Truman Bodden Stadium, George Town	Derek Stoltz (Canada)
20-Apr-2008	Bahamas	13 - 29	Bermuda	Truman Bodden Stadium, George Town	Paul Bretz (United States)
20-Apr-2008	Barbados	21 - 20	Mexico	Truman Bodden Stadium, George Town	Aaron Christie (Jamaica)
Bowl Semifinals
23-Apr-2008	Bahamas	19 - 12	Jamaica	Truman Bodden Stadium, George Town	Larry Mendez (Trinidad and Tobago)
23-Apr-2008	Cayman Islands	6 - 13	Mexico	Truman Bodden Stadium, George Town	Derek Stoltz (Canada)
Championship Semifinals
23-Apr-2008	Bermuda	13 - 25	Guyana	Truman Bodden Stadium, George Town	Tony Spreadbury (England)
23-Apr-2008	Trinidad and Tobago	56 - 0	Barbados	Truman Bodden Stadium, George Town	Paul Bretz (United States)
Shield Final
26-Apr-2008	Cayman Islands	11 - 10	Jamaica	Truman Bodden Stadium, George Town	N/A
Bowl Final
26-Apr-2008	Mexico	17 - 23	Bahamas	Truman Bodden Stadium, George Town	N/A
Plate Final
26-Apr-2008	Bermuda	17 - 6	Barbados	Truman Bodden Stadium, George Town	N/A
Championship Final (RWC 2011 Qualifying Final)
26-Apr-2008	Guyana	24 - 40	Trinidad and Tobago	Truman Bodden Stadium, George Town	Tony Spreadbury (England)

== Round 1B (South American Consur B Championships) – June 2008 ==
This round is also the 2008 South American Rugby Championship B Division, a competition for second tier South American nations. The tournament was played at Colegio de San José in Asunción, Paraguay in June 2008. The winners were Brazil who beat hosts Paraguay on the final day. They advanced to Round 2 to face Trinidad and Tobago. Brazil and Paraguay were promoted to the Division A of the Consur.

=== Standings ===
Team	Played	Won	Drawn	Lost	For	Against	Difference	BP	Pts
Brazil	4	4	0	0	169	20	+149	3	19
Paraguay	4	3	0	1	181	25	+156	3	15
Venezuela	4	2	0	2	86	123	-37	2	10
Colombia	4	1	0	3	53	148	-95	0	4
Peru	4	0	0	4	23	196	-173	1	1

=== Matches ===
Match Results
Date	Winner	Score	Loser	Venue
19-Jun-2008	Paraguay	44 - 3	Venezuela	Colegio de San José, Asunción
19-Jun-2008	Brazil	34 - 6	Colombia	Colegio de San José, Asunción
21-Jun-2008	Venezuela	34 - 15	Colombia	Colegio de San José, Asunción
21-Jun-2008	Paraguay	71 - 0	Peru	Colegio de San José, Asunción
23-Jun-2008	Brazil	61 - 8	Venezuela	Colegio de San José, Asunción
23-Jun-2008	Colombia	25 - 20	Peru	Colegio de San José, Asunción
26-Jun-2008	Brazil	59 - 0	Peru	Colegio de San José, Asunción
26-Jun-2008	Paraguay	60 - 7	Colombia	Colegio de San José, Asunción
29-Jun-2008	Venezuela	41 - 3	Peru	Colegio de San José, Asunción
29-Jun-2008	Brazil	15 - 6	Paraguay	Colegio de San José, Asunción

== Round 2 (Regional Champions Playoff) ==
This playoff was between the two regional champions of Round 1. The winner of the playoff progressed to join Uruguay and Chile in Round 3A.

Match Results
Date	Home	Score	Away	Venue	Referee
11-Oct-2008	Trinidad and Tobago	8 - 31	Brazil	Larry Gomes Stadium, Malabar	David Smortchevsky (Canada)
18-Oct-2008	Brazil	24 - 12	Trinidad and Tobago	Estádio ADC Parahyba, São José dos Campos	Santiago Slinger (Uruguay)

Brazil advanced by winning the series two matches to none.

== Round 3A (South America Consur A Championships) - April/May 2009 ==
This round was also the 2009 South American Rugby Championship A Division, a competition for first tier South American nations. The tournament was played in Montevideo, Uruguay (with the exception of the first match played in Viña del Mar, Chile) in April and May 2009. Paraguay participated in the tournament; however, their participation was limited to the Consur A Championship and their results had no bearing on Rugby World Cup qualifying. Uruguay, who defeated Chile and Brazil, qualified for Round 4 to face the loser of Round 3B.

=== Standings ===
Team	Played	Won	Drawn	Lost	For	Against	Difference	Points
Uruguay	2	2	0	0	117	12	+105	6
Chile	2	1	0	1	88	49	+39	4
Brazil	2	0	0	2	6	150	-144	2

Match Results
Date	Home	Score	Away	Venue	Referee
25-Apr-2009	Chile	79 - 3	Brazil	Estadio Sausalito, Viña del Mar	TBA
29-Apr-2009	Uruguay	71 - 3	Brazil	Estadio Charrúa, Montevideo	TBA
02-May-2009	Chile	9 - 46	Uruguay	Estadio Charrúa, Montevideo	TBA

== Round 3B (North American Qualification Playoff) ==
This round was a two legged playoff between the USA and Canada. The winner, Canada, qualified for Pool A of the 2011 Rugby World Cup as Americas 1; the USA moved on to Round 4.

Match Results
Date	Home	Score	Away	Venue	Referee
04-Jul-2009	United States	12 - 6	Canada	Blackbaud Stadium, Charleston, South Carolina	Alan Lewis (Ireland)
11-Jul-2009	Canada	41 - 18	United States	Ellerslie Rugby Park, Edmonton, Alberta	Alan Lewis (Ireland)

Series drawn 1-1. Canada won on aggregate 47 - 30.

== Round 4 (Final American Qualification Playoff) ==
This two-legged playoff between Uruguay, the winner of South American Qualification (Round 3A), and the US, the loser of the North American Playoff (Round 3B) qualified the United States for Pool C of the Rugby World Cup as Americas 2, while Uruguay advanced to the Final Place Playoff as Americas 3 to face Kazakhstan (the second place Asian team) in the semifinal.

Match Results
Date	Home	Score	Away	Venue	Referee
14-Nov-2009	Uruguay	22–27	United States	Estadio Charrúa, Montevideo	Federico Pastrana (Argentina)
21-Nov-2009	United States	27–6	Uruguay	Central Broward Regional Park, Lauderhill, Florida	David Smortchevsky (Canada)

USA won the series 2–0 and 54–28 on aggregate.

=== Uruguay v USA ===
14 November 2009
18:00 (UTC-02)

Uruguay	22 – 27	United States
Try: Etcheverry 79' c Con: Etcheverry (1/1); Pen: Morales 18'; Etcheverry (4) 55', 64', 74', 76'	Report	Tries: Usasz 14' m Swiryn (2) 19' m, 48' c Wyles 65' c Con: Hercus (2/4); Pen: Hercus 37'

Estadio Charrúa, Montevideo
Attendance: 2,000
Referee: Federico Pastrana (Argentina)

=== USA v Uruguay ===
21 November 2009
14:00 EST (UTC-05)

United States	27 – 6	Uruguay
Tries: Stanfill 20' m Swiryn 35' m Clever (2) 46' c, 80' c Con: Hercus (1/3); Malifa (1/1); Pen: Hercus (1/2) 2'; Drop: Hercus (0/1)	Report	Pen: Etcheverry (2/3) 40', 43'

Central Broward Regional Park, Lauderhill
Attendance: 2,237
Referee: David Smortchevsky (Canada)

== See also ==
- Rugby World Cup
- 2011 Rugby World Cup
- 2011 Rugby World Cup qualifying
