= 2019 Rugby Americas North Championship =

- Date: 9 March - TBA
- Countries: Barbados; Bermuda; British Virgin Islands; Curaçao; Dominican Republic; Guadeloupe; Guyana; Jamaica; Martinique; Turks and Caicos Islands
- Website: www.rugbyamericasnorth.com

The 2019 Rugby Americas North Championship is a rugby union championship for Tier 3 North American and Caribbean teams.

== Format ==
This is the second edition of the tournament since the launch of the Americas Rugby Challenge, and the second consecutive year with major structural changes.

With Cayman Islands winning promotion to the Americas Rugby Challenge, and Trinidad and Tobago electing not to participate, the Championship division of both the north and south zones have been reduced to single matches, followed by a championship play-off, the winner of which will play the lower ranked North American team of the 2019 Americas Rugby Challenge for promotion. The lower Cup divisions of each zone will consist of three teams each playing in a single round robin. Also, multiple North American teams are scheduled to play one-off tests and warm-up matches for the Americas Rugby Challenge.

Also, there is no promotion and relegation between divisions planned for this year, as the 2020 edition of the tournament is expected to be part of qualification for the 2023 Rugby World Cup, and will only involve full members of World Rugby.

The following teams are scheduled to take part in the 2019 tournament. World Rankings are taken from the start of each division.

North Zone

Championship

- Bermuda (73)
- Jamaica (64)

Cup

- British Virgin Islands (N/A)
- Dominican Republic (N/A)
- Turks and Caicos Islands (N/A)

South Zone

Championship

- Guadeloupe (N/A)
- Guyana (59)

Cup

- Barbados (81)
- Curaçao (N/A)
- Martinique (N/A)

== North Zone ==
=== Championship ===
This match was originally scheduled to be the promotion playoff after the 2018 Rugby Americas North Championship, but was reworked to be the 2019 championship proper after Cayman Islands were promoted out of the competition to the Americas Rugby Challenge.

9 March 2019	Bermuda	43 - 14	Jamaica	Bermuda National Stadium, Devonshire
	Try: Healy 10', 50', 58'; Baum 13'; Brown 20'; McGlynn 29', 45'; Con: Archibald (4/7) 21', 46', 51', 59'; Cards: McGlynn (yellow card) 33' to 43'; Richardson (yellow card) 40' to 50'	WR Report	Try: Smith 35'; Annakie 42'; Con: Jarvis (2/2) 36', 42'	Attendance: 500

=== Cup ===
Rank	Team	Games				Points			Try Bonus	Losing Bonus	Table Points
Rank	Team	Played	Won	Drawn	Lost	For	Against	Diff	Try Bonus	Losing Bonus	Table Points
1	Turks and Caicos Islands	2	2	0	0	55	32	+23	2	0	10
2	Dominican Republic	2	1	0	1	35	24	+11	1	1	6
3	British Virgin Islands	2	0	0	2	12	46	-34	0	0	0

13 April 2019	Turks and Caicos Islands	24 - 20	Dominican Republic	Meridian Field, Providenciales
16:00 (UTC-4)	Try: Outten 18'; Simmons 65'; Chery 73'; Mompremier 79'; Con: Butler (2/4) 19', 79'; Pen: Butler (0/1)	WR Report	Try: Arlas 23'; Mario Picrado 31'; Carpio 53'; David Alvarez 69'; Con: Tavarez (0/4); Cards: Jimenez (yellow card) 47' to 57'	Attendance: 100

4 May 2019	British Virgin Islands	12 - 31	Turks and Caicos Islands	A.O. Shirley Stadium, Road Town
TBC	Try: Maxwell 62'; Oliver 78'; Con: Parsons (1/2) 63'; Cards: Cullen (yellow card) 58'; Thornton (yellow card) 67'; Elton-Pena (yellow card) 74'	Report	Try: Butler 40'; Simmons 49'; Dorvil 65'; Mompremier 70'; Williams 80'; Con: Butler (3/4) 40', 49', 66'; Mompremier(0/1); Pen: Butler (0/1); Cards: Jones (red card) 74'	Attendance: 150

14 September 2019	Dominican Republic	15-0	British Virgin Islands	Centro Olimpico, Santo Domingo
	Try: Abreu 46'; Paulino 71'; Portes 79'	Report		Attendance: 200

== South Zone ==
=== Championship ===
27 April 2019	Guyana	5 - 19	Guadeloupe	National Rugby Park Field, Georgetown
	Try: Charles 72'; Con: Adonis (0/1); Cards: Staglon (yellow card) 29'	Report	Try: Brun 33'; Jung 37'; Delabroy 62'; Con: Berthomieu (2/3) 33', 37'; Pen: Berthomieu (0/3)	Attendance: 300

=== Cup ===
Rank	Team	Games				Points			Try Bonus	Losing Bonus	Table Points
Rank	Team	Played	Won	Drawn	Lost	For	Against	Diff	Try Bonus	Losing Bonus	Table Points
1	Martinique	2	2	0	0	82	19	+63	2	0	10
2	Barbados	2	1	0	1	74	50	+24	1	0	5
3	Curaçao	2	0	0	2	7	94	-87	0	0	0

16 March 2019	Martinique	43 - 19	Barbados	Stade Armand Ribier, Le Diamant
18:45	Try: Thomas 1', 14', 16'; Guillot 8'; Morellato 24'; Eguienta 51'; Courcier 64', 75'; Con: Guillot (0/1); Courcier (0/7); Pen: Courcier (1/1) 28'	WR Report	Try: Oxley 34'; Penalty try 57'; Murrell 79'; Con: Carter (1/1) 35'; Oxley (0/1)	Attendance: 420

23 March 2019	Martinique	39 - 0	Curaçao	Stade Armand Ribier, Le Diamant
18:45	Try: Thomas 24'; Cano 54'; Resouf 64'; Boulogne 74'; Carel 80'; Con: Courcier (1/1) 24'; Laclau Lacrouts (2/4) 54', 74'; Pen: Courcier (0/2); Laclau Lacrouts (1/1) 51'	WR Report	Cards: Barrevoet (yellow card) 78' to 80'	Attendance: 485

6 April 2019	Barbados	55 - 7	Curaçao	Garrison Savannah, Bridgetown
	Try: Oxley 22', 73', 80'; Walcott 32'; Blunt 38'; Phillips 54'; Ward 63', 78', 79'; Con: Carter (5/8) 33', 39', 54', 64', 78'; Oxley (0/1); Pen: Carter (0/1)	WR Report	Try: Willemsen 76'; Con: Van Balkom 76'; Pen: Uitvlugt (0/2); Cards: Ignesia Maria (yellow card) 25' to 35'	Attendance: 50

== RAN Final Championship 2019 ==
North ChampionShip Winner vs South ChampionShip Winner

21 September 2019	Bermuda	33 - 10	Guadeloupe	National Sports Club, Devonshire
	Try: Brown 1', 71'; Baum 25', 73'; Penalty Try 64'; Con: Cole (3/4) 2', 26', 72'; Pen: Cole (0/3)	WR Report; ARN Report	Try: Dagorn 55'; Con: Guenec (1/1) 56'; Pen: Carbonel (0/2); Guenec (1/1) 52'; Cards: Magniont (yellow card) 62'; Lucien (yellow card) 78'

== America Challenge Play off ==
NACRA Champion vs Lower placed RAN team in Americas Challenge 2019

Bermuda	v	Cayman Islands
