= 2015 NACRA Rugby Championship =

- Champions: Trinidad and Tobago
- Runners-up: Mexico

The 2015 NACRA Rugby Championship, the eighth edition of the NACRA Rugby Championship, was a rugby union championship for Tier 3 North American and Caribbean teams. Pool play took place between 28 February and 18 April. A championship game, as well as promotion/relegation matches, followed.

The championship was split between North and South zones, which each had a three-team championship. The North Zone had a three-team cup, while the South Zone had a four-team cup. The winner of each championship played for the final, championship game, and a promotion/relegation game was played in each zone, between the winner of the cup, and the last place team of the championship.

Competition points are different from most rugby union tournaments: Two points are awarded for a win, one for a draw. There are also bonus points for scoring four tries and for losing within a margin of seven points or less.

== Teams ==
Thirteen teams participated in this year's tournament. They were seeded into two pools based on their regional rankings.

North Zone	South Zone
Championship
USA South	Trinidad and Tobago
Cayman Islands	Guyana
Mexico	Barbados
Cup
Bahamas	Curaçao
Bermuda	British Virgin Islands
Turks and Caicos Islands	Saint Lucia
	Saint Vincent and the Grenadines

There were two notable changes from the previous year: Mexico replaced Bermuda in the North Championship, and Jamaica was no longer participating.

== North Zone ==
=== North Zone Championship ===
Rank	Team	Games				Points			Try bonus	Losing bonus	Table points
Rank	Team	Played	Won	Drawn	Lost	For	Against	Difference	Try bonus	Losing bonus	Table points
1	Mexico (64)	2	2	0	0	74	28	+46	1	0	7
2	Cayman Islands (54)	2	1	0	1	28	48	-20	0	0	3
3	(United States) USA South (NR)	2	0	0	2	49	75	-26	1	1	2

Pre-tournament World Rugby Rankings in parentheses. USA South was not a full member of World Rugby.

Games

March 7, 2015	Mexico	50–25	(United States) USA South	Universidad Iberoamericana, Santa Fe, Mexico City, Mexico
15:00 AST	Try: Henning 4'; Arredondo 8'; Cordone 35'; Pierre 47'; Carner 56'; Sandros 67'; Nadaud Del Castillo 73'; Rodriguez Escobedo 78'; Con: Carner 5', 36'; Sandros 48', 57', 68'	Match Centre	Try: Winiarczyk 24', 76'; Gouda 64'; Con: Hughston 25', 76'; Pen: Hughston 20', 34'

March 21, 2015	USA South (United States)	24–25	Cayman Islands	Life University, Marietta, United States of America
15:00 AST	Try: Benjamin Winiarczyk, Brendan Smith, David Winiarczyk, Cathal Doyle; Con: Luca Baistrocchi 2	Team Sheet; Match Report	Try: Justin Wight, Morgan Hayward, Jonathan Murphy; Con: Morgan Hayward 2 Pen: Morgan Hayward 2

April 11, 2015	Cayman Islands	3–24	Mexico	Truman Bodden Sports Complex, George Town, Cayman Islands
15:00 AST	Pen: Haywood 49'	Match Centre	Try: Rodriguez 25'; Flegmann Sandler 40'; Nadaud Del Castillo 78', 80'; Con: Susarrey Diaz-Barriga 78', 80'; Cards: Reyes Conn (yellow card) 3' to 13' (yellow-red card) 72'; Ruiz (yellow card) 47' to 57'

=== North Zone Cup ===
Rank	Team	Games				Points			Try bonus	Losing bonus	Table points
Rank	Team	Played	Won	Drawn	Lost	For	Against	Difference	Try bonus	Losing bonus	Table points
1	Bahamas (86)	2	2	0	0	45	22	+23	1	0	5
2	Bermuda (62)	2	1	0	1	70	24	+46	1	1	4
3	Turks and Caicos Islands (NR)	2	0	0	2	10	79	-69	0	0	0

Pre-tournament World Rugby Rankings in parentheses. Turks & Caicos Islands were not a full member of World Rugby.

Games

March 7, 2015	Bermuda	55-3	Turks and Caicos Islands	National Sports Centre, Devonshire Parish, Bermuda
15:00 AST	Try: Dan Cole 2, Rich Cumbers, Dunfred Davis, Paul Dobinson, Tom Healy, Roedolf Van Der Westhuizen; Con: Paddy Calow 4 Pen: Paddy Calow 4	Team Sheet	Pen: Gareth Butler	Attendance: 250

March 21, 2015	Bahamas	21–15	Bermuda	Winston Rugby Centre, Nassau, Bahamas
15:00 AST	Try: Giovanni Rolle, Michael Watkins, Charles Smith; Con: 3	Match Report	Try: Paul Davis, Roedolf van der Westhuizen; Con: Patrick Calow; Pen: Patrick Calow

April 18, 2015	Turks and Caicos Islands	7-24	Bahamas	Meridian Field, Providenciales, Turks and Caicos Islands
TBA AST	Try: Turbyfield 36'; Con: Turbyfield 37'	Match Report	Try: Beadle 19'; Cutler 21'; Con: Salabie 19'; Pen: Salabie 10', 45', 50', 71'; Cards: Beadle (yellow card) 57' to 67'

=== North Zone Championship relegation play-off ===
January 9, 2016	Bahamas	18-37	(United States) USA South	Winston Rugby Centre, Nassau, Bahamas
15:00 EST

== South Zone ==
=== South Zone Championship ===
Position	Team	Games				Points			Try bonus	Losing bonus	Table points
Position	Team	Played	Won	Drawn	Lost	For	Against	Difference	Try bonus	Losing bonus	Table points
1	Trinidad and Tobago (52)	2	2	0	0	66	27	+39	1	0	5
2	Guyana (53)	2	1	0	1	68	44	+24	1	0	3
3	Barbados (73)	2	0	0	2	29	92	-63	0	0	0

Pre-tournament World Rugby Rankings in parentheses.
Games

March 7, 2015	Guyana	48-22	Barbados	Guyana National Stadium, Providence, Guyana
15:00 AST	Try: Corbin 15'; Angus 28', 70'; Bailey 36', 48'; Butts 43'; Henry 50'; Staglon 55'; Con: Gonsalves 28', 43', 51'; Prowell 55'; Cards: Prowell (yellow card) 34' to 44'	Match Report	Try: Faggiani 20', 58'; Millar 66'; Clarke 74'; Con: Cummins 66'	Attendance: 500

March 21, 2015	Barbados	7-44	Trinidad and Tobago	Garrison Savannah Racetrack, Bridgetown, Barbados
15:00 AST	Try: Mikyle Walcott; Con: Kevin Carter	Team Sheet	Try: Anderson Joseph 2, Jessie Richards 2, Akiel Smith 2, Shakir Flemming; Con: 3 Pen: 1

April 11, 2015	Trinidad and Tobago	22-20	Guyana	Port of Spain, Trinidad and Tobago
15:00 AST	Try: Phillip 22'; Wright 37'; Alleyne 60'; Cabera 69'; Con: Guerra 38'	Match Report	Try: McKenzie 42', 78'; Corbin 64'; Staglon 72'	Attendance: 400

=== South Zone Cup ===
Position	Team	Games				Points			Bonus	Table points
Position	Team	Played	Won	Drawn	Lost	For	Against	Difference	Bonus	Table points
1	British Virgin Islands (NR)	3	3	0	0	63	29	+34	0	6
2	Curaçao (NR)	3	1	1	1	60	62	-2	2	5
3	Saint Vincent and the Grenadines (78)	3	1	1	1	55	54	+1	1	4
4	Saint Lucia (NR)	3	0	0	3	41	74	-33	0	0

Pre-tournament World Rugby Rankings in parentheses. British Virgin Islands, Curaçao and St Lucia were not full members of World Rugby.

Games

February 28, 2015	Saint Lucia	14–22	British Virgin Islands	Mindoo Phillip Park, Castries, St Lucia
15:00 AST	Try: Lenford Eugene 32'; Claudius Butcher 43'; Con: Colvis Samuels 32', 44'; Cards: Joseph (yellow card) 18' to 28'	Report	Try: Adebola Hafner 35'; Andrae Adams 68'; Eugene Maduro 80'; Con: Rory Greenan 36', 69'; Pen: Rory Greenan 40'	Attendance: 4000

March 7, 2015	Curaçao	24–24	Saint Vincent and the Grenadines	CH Mahuma Field, Willemstad, Curaçao
15:00 AST	Try: Verburg 47'; Sonnenberg 62'; Perry 69'; Dekker 75'; Con: Perry 48', 62'	Match Centre	Try: Comas 22'; Phillips 24'; Lewis 32'; Matthews 55'; Con: Kruger 23', 33'	Attendance: 6000

March 21, 2015	Saint Lucia	8–16	Saint Vincent and the Grenadines	Castries, St Lucia
15:00 AST	Try: Henson Hunte; Pen: Colvis Samuel	Team Sheet	Try: Anzio Lewis 2 Pen: Kimran Barnum, George Kruger	Attendance: 8500

April 11, 2015	Saint Lucia	19-36	Curaçao	Mindoo Phillip Park, Castries, St Lucia
15:00 AST

April 18, 2015	Saint Vincent and the Grenadines	15-22	British Virgin Islands	Arnos Vale Stadium, Kingstown, Saint Vincent and the Grenadines
15:00 AST

2 May 2015	British Virgin Islands	19-0	Curaçao	A. O. Shirley Recreation Ground, Road Town, British Virgin Islands
15:00 AST	Try: Shamarie Spencer, Noel Maxwell, Austin Keil; Con: Rory Thornton 2	BVI Platinum Match Report		Attendance: 2000

=== South Zone Championship relegation play-off ===
November 7, 2015	British Virgin Islands	15-17	Barbados	A.O. Shirley Stadium, Road Town, Tortola, British Virgin Islands
	Try: Wilson 13'c Holmes 39'; Con: Thornton 13'; Pen: Thornton 2'		Try: Edwards 33'c Carter 59'c Con: Carter 34', 60'; Pen: Carter 10'	Attendance: 100

== Final ==
The champions of the north and south zone championship, Mexico and Trinidad and Tobago respectively, faced off in the NACRA Championship final. Trinidad and Tobago, as the higher ranked team, earned the right to host the match at St Mary's College Sports Ground on 25 April 2015.

Trinidad and Tobago won their third NACRA Championship, defeating first time finalists, Mexico, in the final 30-16.

April 25, 2015	Trinidad and Tobago	30-16	Mexico	St Mary's College Sports Ground, Port-of-Spain, Trinidad and Tobago
15:00 AST	Try: Samuel Roberts (9'), Adam Frederick (31'c), Penalty Try (40'), Agboola Silverthorn (74'c); Con: Andrew Taylor 2 Pen: Andrew Taylor (26'), Felician Guerra (34'); Cards: Felician Guerra (yellow card) 60' to 70'	WR Team Sheet, NACRA Match Report	Try: Marcus Flegmann (46'), Simon Pierre (66'); Pen: Miguel Carner 2 (10', 29'); Cards: Marcus Flegmann (yellow card) 29' to 39'	Attendance: 450; Referee: (Cayman Islands) Dave Sherwin

== See also ==
- NACRA Rugby Championship
