= 2018 Rugby Americas North Championship =

Rugby union tournament

- Date: 14 April - 7 July
- Countries: Barbados; Bermuda; Cayman Islands; Curaçao; Dominican Republic; Guadeloupe; Jamaica; Trinidad and Tobago; United States

Tournament statistics
- Matches played: 11
- Website: www.rugbyamericasnorth.com

The 2018 Rugby Americas North Championship, the 11th edition of the tournament, is a rugby union championship for Tier 3 North American and Caribbean teams.

== Format ==
A significant restructuring of the tournament took place for the 2018 edition to accommodate the launch of the Americas Rugby Challenge. Unlike previous editions of the tournament, the teams will not be split geographically into north and south conferences, but will instead be combined into three tiered divisions: the Championship, the Cup, and the Trophy. Mexico and Guyana do not return to the RAN Championship as they are competing in the 2018 Americas Rugby Challenge. The lower-placed of those two teams will enter a promotion/relegation playoff with the top team in the RAN Championship (excluding USA South) for a place in the 2019 Americas Rugby Challenge.

Championship

- Bermuda (76)
- (United States) USA South (N/A)
- Cayman Islands (53)
- Trinidad and Tobago (52)

Cup

- Jamaica (67)
- Barbados (79)

Trophy

- Curaçao (N/A)
- Dominican Republic (N/A)
- Guadeloupe (N/A)

pre-tournament World Rugby Rankings in parentheses.

== Championship ==
While Trinidad and Tobago played two of their games, they were removed from tournament standings due to being unable to rearrange their fixture against Cayman Islands, scheduled for June 23, due to a lack of funding.

Standings

Legend
Advance to Americas Rugby Challenge promotion playoff
Advance to relegation playoff

Rank	Team	Games				Points			Try Bonus	Losing Bonus	Table Points
Rank	Team	Played	Won	Drawn	Lost	For	Against	Diff	Try Bonus	Losing Bonus	Table Points
1	(United States) USA South	2	2	0	0	90	42	+48	2	0	10
2	Cayman Islands	2	1	0	1	34	61	-27	0	0	4
3	Bermuda	2	0	0	2	47	68	-21	1	1	2

Matches

12 May 2018	Bermuda	28-48	(United States) USA South	Bermuda National Stadium, Devonshire
15:00		WR Report; RAN Report

19 May 2018	Trinidad and Tobago	27-24	Bermuda	St. Anthony's College, Martin
16:00

9 June 2018	Cayman Islands	20-19	Bermuda

16 June 2018	Trinidad and Tobago	34-33	(United States) USA South

7 July 2018	USA South (United States)	42-14	Cayman Islands

== Cup ==
Standings

Legend
Advance to promotion playoff

Rank	Team	Games				Points			Try Bonus	Losing Bonus	Table Points
Rank	Team	Played	Won	Drawn	Lost	For	Against	Diff	Try Bonus	Losing Bonus	Table Points
1	Jamaica	2	2	0	0	96	43	+53	2	0	10
2	Barbados	2	0	0	2	43	96	-53	0	1	1

Matches

28 April 2018	Jamaica	60-14	Barbados

12 May 2018	Barbados	29-36	Jamaica

== Trophy ==
Standings

Rank	Team	Games				Points			Try Bonus	Losing Bonus	Table Points
Rank	Team	Played	Won	Drawn	Lost	For	Against	Diff	Try Bonus	Losing Bonus	Table Points
1	Guadeloupe	2	1	0	1	44	24	+20	1	1	6
2	Dominican Republic	2	1	0	1	63	56	+7	1	0	5
3	Curaçao	2	1	0	1	24	51	-27	0	0	4

Matches

14 April 2018	Curaçao	17-46	Dominican Republic

12 May 2018	Guadeloupe	5-7	Curaçao

9 June 2018	Dominican Republic	17-39	Guadeloupe

== Promotion playoffs ==
9 February 2019	Cayman Islands	58-14	Guyana
		Report
