= D. T. H. van der Merwe =

Canada international rugby union player

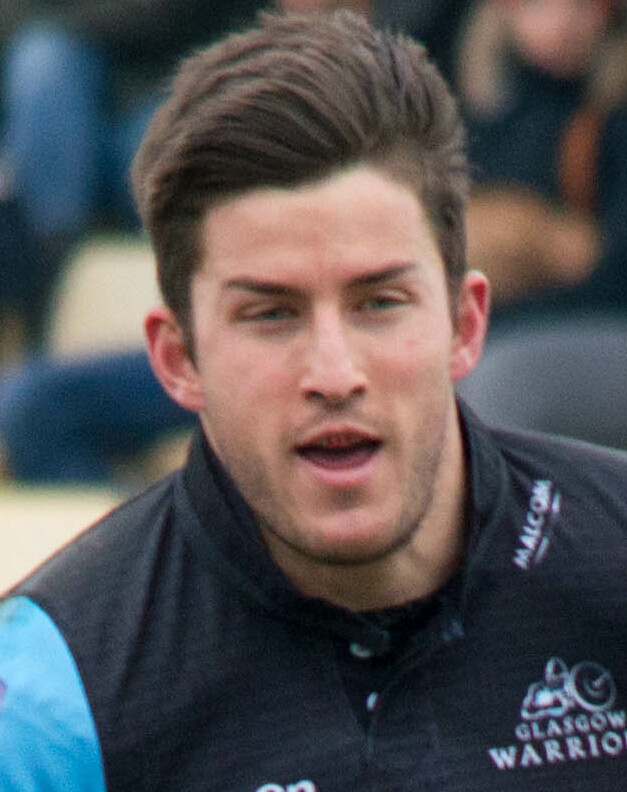
- Van der Merwe in 2015
- Born: Daniel Tailliferre Hauman van der Merwe; 28 April 1986 (age 40) Worcester, South Africa
- Height: 6 ft 0 in (1.83 m)
- Weight: 92 kg (14 st 7 lb; 203 lb)

Rugby union career
- Position: Centre / Wing / Full-back
Amateur team(s)
Years	Team	Apps	(Points)
- Regina Rogues
2005–2009	James Bay AA		
2018–2020	Ayr		
Senior career
Years	Team	Apps	(Points)
2007–2008	Saracens	1	(0)
2009–2015	Glasgow Warriors	96	(215)
2015–2017	Scarlets	41	(100)
2017–2018	Newcastle Falcons	3	(5)
2018–2020	Glasgow Warriors	28	(60)
2021–2022	LA Giltinis	9	(45)
- Correct as of 25 June 2024
International career
Years	Team	Apps	(Points)
2006–2019	Canada	61	(190)
- Correct as of 17 October 2019

Daniel Tailliferre Hauman van der Merwe (born 28 April 1986) is a retired Canadian professional rugby union player who played for many clubs throughout his career such as Glasgow Warriors and Scarlets, both of the URC, Saracens and Newcastle, both of the English Premiership, and LA Giltinis of Major League Rugby (MLR). He is often considered the greatest Canadian rugby player of all time.

He most notably played for the Glasgow Warriors and was the club's all-time record try scorer until George Horne surpassed it on 29 March 2025.

== Early life ==
Van der Merwe was born in Worcester, South Africa. Van der Merwe took up rugby at the age of five progressing through the game and eventually making the Boland U-16 squad.

Van der Merwe and his family emigrated from South Africa to Regina, Saskatchewan, Canada in 2003 at the age of 17. In Regina, Van der Merwe attended Dr. Martin LeBoldus High School and played for the Rogues Rugby Club where he managed to make the Saskatchewan U-18 and U-21 rugby teams as well as the Prairie Fire of the now defunct Rugby Canada Super League. In 2005, Van der Merwe moved to Victoria, British Columbia where he joined the James Bay Athletic Association of the British Columbia Premier League. With James Bay, Van der Merwe went on to win Provincial Championships in 2006, 2007, and 2008 as well as the National Championship in 2007.

== Club career ==
Van der Merwe had signed a short-term contract with Saracens F.C. following a break-out performance for Canada at the 2007 Rugby World Cup. Van der Merwe had appeared for the team in a number of A League matches as well as making appearances in the 2007–08 EDF Energy Cup. However, Van der Merwe suffered a serious ankle injury which sidelined him for 18 months. This injury saw Van der Merwe miss the 2008 Churchill Cup and Canada's 2008 European tour as well as ending his time with Saracens.

Following the 2009 Churchill Cup, Van der Merwe joined Glasgow Warriors on a two-year contract. Van der Merwe debuted for the Scottish side as a replacement against the Cardiff Blues in October of that year. During the 2009–10 Celtic League season van der Merwe made 11 appearances scoring 4 tries in the process for a total of 20 points as well as playing in 4 matches of the 2009–10 Heineken Cup.

The 2010–11 Celtic League season saw Van der Merwe come into his own, starting 19 matches and picking up nine tries along the way. Van der Merwe finished as Glasgow's highest try scorer for the season as well as finishing tied for third with Jonathan Davies in the Celtic League's leading try-scorer category. Van der Merwe also started 5 matches and score 3 more tries in the 2010–11 Heineken Cup.

In March 2011, Van der Merwe re-signed with Glasgow Warriors on a two-year deal.

Following the conclusion of the 2011 Rugby World Cup it was discovered that Van der Merwe sustained some damage while playing in the tournament and was serious enough to require shoulder surgery. Van der Merwe was expected to miss most if not all of the 2011–12 Celtic League season though he returned to the Glasgow line up on the bench for the important RaboDirect Pro12 match against Treviso in Italy towards the end of the regular 2011/12 season. He was brought on as a substitute as the game looked to be slipping away from the Warriors when he picked up a ball in the midfield in the 76th Minute and scored a deciding try.

Van der Merwe signed a new two-year contract in 2013 committing himself to Glasgow until at least 2015.

On 19 February 2015, it was confirmed that Van der Merwe had signed a contract with the Scarlets, leaving Glasgow Warriors after the 2014/15 season. He currently has 39 tries in 90 appearances for the Scottish club. His final game for the club was their victory in the 2014/15 Pro 12 final, in which Van der Merwe scored a try.

Van der Merwe missed the first few games of his debut Scarlets season due to being with Canada at the Rugby World Cup. But once he returned, he made quite an impact, scoring two tries on his debut in a 25–14 victory against Leinster.

On 4 January 2017, it was announced Van der Merwe was leaving the Scarlets at the end of the 2016–17 season. It was announced on 22 February that Merwe has signed for English club Newcastle Falcons in the Aviva Premiership from the 2017–18 season.

However, on 15 March 2018, Van der Merwe left Newcastle with immediate effect to re-sign for Glasgow Warriors back in the Pro14.

Van der Merwe was drafted to Ayr in the Scottish Premiership for the 2018–19 season. He left Glasgow Warriors as their then all-time leading try scorer with 54 tries, but his record was later beaten by George Horne.

Van der Merwe joined the LA Giltinis ahead of the 2021 Major League Rugby season, spending two seasons with the club. Van der Merwe retired from rugby after the Giltinis were expelled from the MLR ahead of the 2022 playoffs due to a violation of league rules and the club was disbanded.

== International career ==
Van der Merwe made his debut for the Canadian national men's team against Barbados in 2006 as part of the third round of the 2007 Rugby World Cup – Americas qualification. Van der Merwe came on as a replacement scoring two tries. Van der Merwe also came off the bench in a losing effort versus Italy later that year.

The year 2007 proved to be a watershed year for the 21-year-old Van der Merwe as his third cap was earned in successful fashion with a 42–12 win against Portugal, contributing two tries for the Canadians. This promising play earned Van der Merwe a spot on the 2007 Canadian Rugby World Cup squad. He started all four matches and scored a try in the 12–12 draw with Japan. Canada finished last in their pool, missing out on advancement to the next round and failing to achieve automatic qualification for the 2011 Rugby World Cup.

The ankle injury Van der Merwe sustained in late 2007 forced him out of selection for the national team for the entirety of 2008. However, Van der Merwe made his return earning his eighth cap for Canada in a loss versus Ireland on 23 May 2009. The following week the Canadians hosted Wales with Van der Merwe being switched from his familiar back-three role to starting at outside centre. The Canadians put in a worthy effort but eventually dropped the match 32–23. The 2009 Churchill Cup saw Van der Merwe maintain his role in the centres as well as his ability to score. Van der Merwe touched down in the win versus Georgia and also notched two more tries plus a conversion in Canada's final match of the tournament against the Argentina Jaguars, a match Canada lost 44–29. A busy year climaxed with a home and away series with traditional rivals the United States. The two legged playoff between the US and Canada acted as the North American Qualification Playoff for the 2011 Rugby World Cup. The winner by aggregate points would qualify for the 2011 Rugby World Cup as Americas 1. In the first match, taking place in Charleston, South Carolina on 4 July, Van der Merwe again started at outside centre. In a hot and error filled afternoon for both sides, the United States edged the Canadians winning the match by six points, 12–6. One week later these sides met again in Edmonton, Alberta. The first half saw USA outside centre Paul Emerick receive a red card for kicking Van der Merwe who had been grounded after making a tackle. Van der Merwe continued on in the game notching one of six tries scored by the Canadians. Canada won the match 41–18 as well as being awarded qualification to the 2011 Rugby World Cup by winning the series on aggregate, 47–30.

The following summer, Van der Merwe was again in the Canadian selection for the 2010 Churchill Cup. Canada began pool play with a win against Uruguay with Van der Merwe picking up two tries in the second half of the match. Canada reached the Churchill Cup final for the first time after a hard-fought and historical 33–27 win against France A. Van der Merwe once again started at outside centre for the Canadians, however, their efforts were not enough as they lost the final to England Saxons 38–18.

Van der Merwe retired from international rugby following the 2019 Rugby World Cup.
