= 2003 Rugby World Cup qualifying =

Rugby qualifying competition

Tournament details
- Dates: 1999 – 2003
- No. of nations: 89

The qualification process for the 2003 Rugby World Cup began during the pool stages of the 1999 tournament in Wales, during which the quarterfinalists were awarded automatic qualification for the 2003 event. A further twelve teams qualified through regional tournaments and the repechage process.

== Qualifiers ==
	Africa	Americas	Asia	Europe	Oceania
Qualified at 1999 RWC	South Africa	Argentina		England; France; Scotland; Wales	Australia (holders)(Hosts); New Zealand
Qualified via Regional Slots	Namibia (Africa 1)	Canada (Americas 1); Uruguay (Americas 2)	Japan (Asia 1)	Ireland (Europe 1); Italy (Europe 2); Romania (Europe 3); Georgia (Europe 4)	Fiji (Oceania 1); Samoa (Oceania 2)
Qualified via Repechage		United States			Tonga

== Qualifiers ==
79 teams competed qualifying.

Region	Teams entered qualifying process	Qualifying berths	Repechage berths	Qualified team(s)	Repechage team(s)
Africa	12	1	1	Namibia	Tunisia
Americas	17	2	1	Canada; Uruguay	United States
Asia	11	1	1	Japan	South Korea
Europe	32	4	1	Ireland; Italy; Romania; Georgia	Spain
Oceania	9	2	1	Fiji; Samoa	Tonga
TOTALS	81	10	5		(1 WC Place)

== Repechage qualification ==
- Repechage 1 United States
- Repechage 2 Tonga

== Africa qualification ==
In qualification for the 2003 Rugby World Cup, there was one position for an African nation, as well as the possibility of repechage qualification. Namibia qualified, joining automatic qualifiers South Africa at the competition in Australia.

=== Pool A ===
Pos	Team	Pld	W	D	L	PF	PA	PD	Pts
1	Cameroon	2	1	0	1	41	25	+16	4
2	Uganda	2	1	0	1	21	29	−8	4
3	Zambia	2	1	0	1	37	45	−8	4

==== Match schedule ====
Date	Match	Venue	Result
28 July 2001	Zambia - Cameroon	Chingola, Zambia	25-24
11 August 2001	Uganda – Zambia	Kyadondo, Uganda	21-12
25 August 2001	Cameroon - Uganda	Douala, Cameroon	17-0

=== Pool B ===
Pos	Team	Pld	W	D	L	PF	PA	PD	Pts
1	Madagascar	2	2	0	0	57	32	+25	6
2	Botswana	2	1	0	1	24	34	−10	4
3	Swaziland	2	0	0	2	24	39	−15	2

==== Match schedule ====
Date	Match	Venue	Result
1 September 2001	Botswana - Swaziland	Gaborone, Botswana	13-3
16 September 2001	Madagascar – Botswana	Antananarivo, Madagascar	31-11
29 September 2001	Swaziland - Madagascar	Malkerns, Swaziland	21-26

=== Round 2 ===
==== Final standings ====
Pos	Team	Pld	W	D	L	PF	PA	PD	Pts
1	Madagascar	2	2	0	0	57	44	+13	6
2	Kenya	2	1	0	1	60	42	+18	4
3	Cameroon	2	0	0	2	39	70	−31	2

==== Match Schedule ====
Date	Match	Venue	Result
13 October 2001	Madagascar - Kenya	Antananarivo, Madagascar	27-20
27 October 2001	Cameroon – Madagascar	Yaoundé, Cameroon	24-30
24 November 2001	Kenya - Cameroon	Nairobi, Kenya	40-15

=== Round 3 ===
==== Pool A ====
Pos	Team	Pld	W	D	L	PF	PA	PD	Pts
1	Tunisia	2	2	0	0	40	34	+6	6
2	Morocco	2	1	0	1	49	48	+1	4
3	Ivory Coast	2	0	0	2	29	36	−7	2

===== Match schedule =====
Date	Match	Venue	Result
18 May 2002	Tunisia - Morocco	Tunis, Tunisia	27-26
25 May 2002	Ivory Coast – Tunisia	Abidjan, Ivory Coast	8-13
1 June 2002	Morocco - Ivory Coast	Abidjan, Ivory Coast	23-21

=== Pool B ===
Pos	Team	Pld	W	D	L	PF	PA	PD	Pts
1	Namibia	2	2	0	0	154	30	+124	6
2	Zimbabwe	2	1	0	1	82	45	+37	4
3	Madagascar	2	0	0	2	3	164	−161	2

==== Match schedule ====
Date	Match	Venue	Result
2 June 2002	Madagascar - Zimbabwe	Antananarivo, Madagascar	3-52
15 June 2002	Namibia – Madagascar	Windhoek, Namibia	112-0
29 June 2002	Zimbabwe - Namibia	Bulawayo, Zimbabwe	30-42

=== Round 4 ===
Namibia won the round based on total tries scored (4 to 3). Namibia qualified to Pool A of the 2003 Rugby World Cup as Africa 1. Tunisia advanced to Repechage.

Date	Match	Venue	Result
30 November 2002	Namibia – Tunisia	Windhoek, Namibia	26-19
6 December 2002	Tunisia – Namibia	Tunis, Tunisia	24-17

== Americas qualification ==
In qualification for the 2003 Rugby World Cup, a number of positions were available to Americas nations. Canada, Uruguay and the USA would eventually qualify.

=== Round 1 (North) ===
Winner (Trinidad and Tobago) qualified to Round 2.

Quarter-finals
20 November 2001 - Cayman Islands
Bermuda	Forfeit
Saint Lucia	0
20 November 2001 - Cayman Islands
Barbados	25
Bahamas	18
20 November 2001 - Cayman Islands
Cayman Islands	32
Guyana	13
20 November 2001 - Cayman Islands
Trinidad and Tobago	51
Jamaica	5

Semi-finals
22 November 2001 - Cayman Islands
Bermuda	18
Barbados	5
22 November 2001 - Cayman Islands
Trinidad and Tobago	12
Cayman Islands	8

Final
24 November 2001 - Cayman Islands
Trinidad and Tobago	23
Bermuda	12

=== Round 1 (South) ===
Valid also as 2001 South American Rugby Championship "B"

Winner (Brazil) qualified to Round 2.

==== Final standings ====
Pos	Team	Pld	W	D	L	PF	PA	PD	Pts
1	Brazil	3	3	0	0	112	24	+88	9
2	Venezuela	3	2	0	1	104	33	+71	7
3	Peru	3	1	0	2	59	107	−48	5
4	Colombia	3	0	0	3	22	133	−111	3

==== Match Schedule ====
Date	Match	Venue	Result
6-October-2001	Venezuela - Colombia	Venezuela	55-0
13-October-2001	Venezuela - Peru	Venezuela	46-19
27-October-2001	Brazil - Peru	Brazil	51-9
11-November-2001	Colombia - Brazil	Colombia	12-47
17-November-2001	Brazil - Venezuela	Brazil	14-3
17-November-2001	Peru-Colombia	Peru	31-10

=== Round 2 ===
Winner (Brazil) qualified to Round 3.

Date	Match	Venue	Result
22-December-2001	Trinidad and Tobago - Brazil	Arima (Trinidad and Tobago)	10-11
26-January-2002	Brazil - Trinidad and Tobago	Brazil	9-0

=== Round 3 ===
Pos	Team	Pld	W	D	L	PF	PA	PD	Pts
1	Chile	2	2	0	0	103	11	+92	6
2	Paraguay	2	1	0	1	19	70	−51	4
3	Brazil	2	0	0	2	19	60	−41	2

==== Match schedule ====
Date	Match	Venue	Result
13-April-2002	Brazil - Chile	Brazil	6-46
20-April-2002	Paraguay - Brazil	Paraguay	14-13
28-April-2002	Chile - Paraguay	Chile	57-5

=== Round 4 ===
Top two (Canada and Uruguay) qualified to World Cup as Americas 1 and 2. 3rd Place (USA) to Repechage.

==== Final standings ====
Pos	Team	Pld	W	D	L	PF	PA	PD	Pts
1	Canada	6	5	0	1	192	80	+112	16
2	Uruguay	6	3	0	3	115	144	−29	12
3	United States	6	2	0	4	107	139	−32	10
4	Chile	6	2	0	4	93	144	−51	10

==== Match Schedule ====
Date	Match	Venue	Result
29-June-2002	Canada - USA	Canada	26-9
13-July-2002	USA - Canada	United States	13-36
27-July-2002	Chile - Uruguay	Chile	10-6
10-August-2002	USA - Chile	United States	35-22
10-August-2002	Canada - Uruguay	Canada	51-16
15-August-2002	USA - Uruguay	United States	28-24
17-August-2002	Canada - Chile	Canada	27-6
24-August-2002	Uruguay - Canada	Uruguay	25-23
24-August-2002	Chile - USA	Chile	21-13
31-August-2002	Uruguay - USA	Uruguay	10-9
31-August-2002	Chile - Canada	Chile	11-29
7-September-2002	Uruguay - Chile	Uruguay	34-23

== Asia qualification ==
In qualification for the 2003 Rugby World Cup, there was one position available to the Asia qualifiers, as well as the possibility of further repechage qualification. Japan would go on to qualify for the competition.

=== Round 1 – April 2002 ===
==== Pool A ====
Pos	Team	Pld	W	D	L	PF	PA	PD	Pts
1	Chinese Taipei	1	1	0	0	57	3	+54	3
2	Singapore	1	1	0	0	34	5	+29	3
3	Malaysia	2	0	0	2	8	91	−83	2

===== Match schedule =====
Date	Match	Venue	Result
30 March 2002	Malaysia - Chinese Taipei	Ipoh, Malaysia	3-57
6 April 2002	Singapore – Malaysia	Yio Chu Kang, Singapore	34-5
Not Played	Chinese Taipei - Singapore	Taiwan	Singapore Foreited

==== Pool B ====
Pos	Team	Pld	W	D	L	PF	PA	PD	Pts
1	Hong Kong	2	2	0	0	32	15	+17	6
2	Arabian Gulf	2	1	0	1	47	37	+10	4
3	Thailand	2	0	0	2	28	55	−27	2

===== Match schedule =====
Date	Match	Venue	Result
5 April 2002	Arabian Gulf - Thailand	Doha, Qatar	40-20
12 April 2002	Thailand – Hong Kong	Bangkok, Thailand	8-15
20 April 2002	Hong Kong – Arabian Gulf	Hong Kong	17-7

==== Pool C ====
Pos	Team	Pld	W	D	L	PF	PA	PD	Pts
1	China	2	1	0	1	64	24	+40	4
2	Sri Lanka	2	1	0	1	23	27	−4	4
3	Kazakhstan	2	1	0	1	35	71	−36	4

===== Match schedule =====
Date	Match	Venue	Result
5 April 2002	Sri Lanka - China	Colombo, Sri Lanka	9-7
12 April 2002	China – Kazakhstan	Shanghai, China	57-15
20 April 2002	Kazakhstan – Sri Lanka	Almaty Kazakhstan	20-14

=== Round 2 – May, 2002 ===
Pos	Team	Pld	W	D	L	PF	PA	PD	Pts
1	Chinese Taipei	2	2	0	0	49	36	+13	6
2	Hong Kong	2	1	0	1	49	27	+22	4
3	China	2	0	0	2	28	63	−35	2

==== Match schedule ====
Date	Match	Venue	Result
18 May 2002	Chinese Taipei - Hong Kong	Tainan, Taiwan	20-15
25 May 2002	China – Chinese Taipei	Shanghai, China	21-29
1 June 2002	Hong Kong - China	Hong Kong	34-7

=== Round 3 – June–July, 2002 ===
Winner (Japan) qualified to Pool B of 2003 Rugby World Cup as Asia 1. Runner-up (Korea) advanced to Repechage.

Pos	Team	Pld	W	D	L	PF	PA	PD	Pts
1	Japan	4	4	0	0	420	47	+373	12
2	South Korea	4	2	0	2	214	183	+31	8
3	Chinese Taipei	4	0	0	4	44	448	−404	4

==== Match schedule ====
Date	Match	Venue	Result
16 June 2002	Japan - Korea	Tokyo, Japan	90-24
23 June 2002	Chinese Taipei - Korea	Tainan, Taiwan	31-54
30 June 2002	Korea – Chinese Taipei	Seoul, South Korea	119-7
6 July 2002	Japan – Chinese Taipei	Tokyo, Japan	155-3
14 July 2002	Korea - Japan	Seoul, South Korea	17-55
21 July 2002	Chinese Taipei - Japan	Tainan, Taiwan	3-120
