= Alejandro Pradillo =

- Born: March 18, 1992 (age 34) Mexico City, Mexico
- Height: 1.83 m (6 ft 0 in)
- Weight: 118 kg (18 st 8 lb; 260 lb)
- School: Greengates International School

Rugby union career
- Position: Prop
Senior career
Years	Team	Apps	(Points)
2025–present	San Diego Legion	1	
- Correct as of 25 February 2025

Alejandro Bola Pradillo (born March 18, 1992) is a Mexican rugby union player who currently plays as a prop for the San Diego Legion of Major League Rugby (MLR). He is a pioneering figure in Mexican rugby, recognized as the first Mexican rugby player in MLR history.

== Club career ==
Pradillo began playing rugby at the age of 13 at Greengates International School in Mexico, where he quickly excelled, winning MVP honors and dominating the U16 and U19 categories in the Mexican Rugby Tournament. At 16, he joined a professional club, Wallabies RFC, in Mexico City. Over five seasons between 2008 and 2013, Pradillo contributed to five national championships.

Pradillo received a scholarship offer to study sports science and play rugby at Hartpury College in the UK, but declined the opportunity due to personal reasons. He played for the San Clemente Rhinos in the 2023 Amateur Rugby World Cup. That year, Pradillo joined the San Diego Centurions, and in 2024, he was invited to play for Kahurangi Rugby Club in New Zealand, helping them secure the Division One trophy in July 2024.

In 2024, Pradillo signed with the San Diego Legion of Major League Rugby (MLR), becoming the first Mexican player in MLR history.

== International career ==
Pradillo's early talent led him to compete against top school teams in London. He played for the Mexico national U16 and U19 teams in Rugby 15s, earning accolades as the best forward in the Rugby Americas North League for two consecutive years with the U19 squad.

Pradillo also represented Mexico, Las Serpientes, in Rugby 7s, competing in the 2011 Pan American Games and the 2022 Central American and Caribbean Games.
