= Curaçao Rugby Federation =

- Sport: Rugby union
- Founded: 2008
- NACRA affiliation: 2011 (Associate Member)
- President: Tamara Van Leeuwen
- Men's coach: Robert Perry
- Women's coach: Robert Perry
- Website: curacaorugbyclub.com

The Curaçao Rugby Federation is the governing body for rugby union within Curaçao. It is an associate member of Rugby Americas North which is the governing body for rugby union in North America and the Caribbean.

Curaçao played its first international in 2013, defeating Saint Vincent and the Grenadines 37-24.

== See also ==
- Curaçao national rugby union team
