= Antigua and Barbuda national rugby union team =

The Antigua and Barbuda national rugby union team represents Antigua and Barbuda in the sport of rugby union. They have thus far not qualified for a Rugby World Cup, and have not participated in qualifying tournaments.

Antigua and Barbuda compete in the Caribbean Rugby Championship, a tournament which includes Trinidad and Tobago, Bermuda, the Cayman Islands, Jamaica, the Bahamas, British Virgin Islands, and Guyana.

== See also ==
- Rugby union in Antigua and Barbuda
