= 2007 Rugby World Cup – Americas qualification =

In qualification for the 2007 Rugby World Cup, 19 countries in the Pan American Rugby Association (PARA) compete for 3 direct entries and 1 repechage place (Repechage 1) against the winner of Africa 2 v Europe 4.

== Qualification Process ==
- Round 1a

It was the 2005 NACRA Rugby Championship with Caribbean teams. Nine teams involved The winner going through to Round 3b.

- Round 1b

CONSUR (Confederation Sudamericana de Rugby) 2nd Division. One pool of four teams - winner progresses to round 2.

- Round 2

Bottom two CONSUR Division 1 teams, plus winner of Round 1b, form one pool of three. Winner progresses to Round 3a.

- Round 3a

Top two CONSUR Division 1 teams, plus winner of Round 2, form one pool of three. Winner progresses directly to RWC 2007 as Americas 1. Runner up progresses to Round 4.

- Round 3b

USA, Canada and winner of Round 1a form one pool of three. Winner progresses directly to RWC 2007 as Americas 2. Runner up progresses to Round 4.

- Round 4

Home and away playoff. Winner qualifies for RWC 2007 as Americas 3. Runner up enters Repechage round.

== Round 1a - 2005 ==
=== Preliminary qualifier ===
28 May 2005

Saint Lucia	36 - 25	Saint Vincent and the Grenadines

St Lucia

One-off match. St Lucia progress to South Pool.

=== South Pool ===
Barbados go into playoff vs winner of North Pool (Bahamas).

Final Standings

Country	GP	W	D	L	+/-	Pts
Barbados	3	3	0	0	103	9
Guyana	3	2	0	1	95	7
Trinidad and Tobago	3	1	0	2	62	5
Saint Lucia	3	0	0	3	-260	3

Match Schedule

8 August 2005

Guyana	17 - 27	Barbados

Guyana

8 August 2005

Saint Lucia	0 - 82	Trinidad and Tobago

Guyana

10 August 2005

Guyana	97 - 0	Saint Lucia

Guyana

10 August 2005

Barbados	25 - 13	Trinidad and Tobago

Guyana

13 August 2005

Barbados	81 - 0	Saint Lucia

Guyana

13 August 2005

Guyana	29 - 21	Trinidad and Tobago

Guyana

=== North Pool ===
Bahamas beat Cayman Islands on head to head to win pool, go into playoff against winner of South Pool (Barbados).

Final Standings

Country	GP	W	D	L	+/-	Pts
Bahamas	3	2	0	1	18	7
Cayman Islands	3	2	0	1	5	7
Jamaica	3	1	1	1	-8	6
Bermuda	3	0	1	2	-15	4

Match Schedule

5 June 2005

Jamaica	10 - 10	Bermuda

Jamaica

5 June 2005

Bahamas	23 - 12	Cayman Islands

Bahamas

8 June 2005

Bermuda	15 - 24	Bahamas

Bahamas

8 June 2005

Cayman Islands	18 - 8	Jamaica

Bahamas

11 June 2005

Cayman Islands	12 - 6	Bermuda

Cayman Islands

11 June 2005

Jamaica	5 - 3	Bahamas

Jamaica

=== Playoff - Winner North Pool vs Winner South Pool ===
Barbados progresses to Round 3b.

1 October 2005

Barbados	52 - 3	Bahamas

Trinidad and Tobago

== Round 1b - 2004 ==
CONSUR 2nd Division. Home OR Away basis. Brazil progresses to Round 2.

Final Standings

Country	GP	W	D	L	+/-	Pts
Brazil	3	3	0	0	150	9
Venezuela	3	2	0	1	8	7
Peru	3	1	0	2	-75	5
Colombia	3	0	0	3	-83	3

Match Schedule

10 October 2004

Brazil	73 - 3	Peru

São Paulo

13 October 2004

Brazil	74 - 0	Colombia

São Paulo

16 October 2004

Peru	15 - 10	Colombia

São Paulo

6 November 2004

Peru	22 - 32	Venezuela

Lima

13 November 2004

Colombia	27 - 31	Venezuela

Bogotá

20 November 2004

Venezuela	5 - 11	Brazil

Caracas

== Round 2 - 2005 ==
Home OR Away basis. Chile progresses to Round 3a.

Final Standings

Country	GP	W	D	L	+/-	Pts
Chile	2	2	0	0	58	6
Paraguay	2	1	0	1	21	4
Brazil	2	0	0	2	-79	2

Match Schedule

2 October 2005

Paraguay	45 - 8	Brazil

Asunción

8 October 2005

Chile	38 - 22	Paraguay

Santiago

13 October 2005

Brazil	13 - 55	Chile

Sao José dos Campos

== Round 3a – July 2006 ==
Home OR Away basis. Argentina progresses directly to RWC 2007 as Americas 1. Uruguay progresses to Round 4.

Current Standings

Country	GP	W	D	L	+/-	Pts
Argentina	2	2	0	0	73	6
Uruguay	2	1	0	1	2	4
Chile	2	0	0	2	-75	2

Match Schedule

1 July 2006

Chile	13 - 60	Argentina

Santiago

8 July 2006

Argentina	26 - 0	Uruguay

Argentina

22 July 2006

Uruguay	43 - 15	Chile

Uruguay

== Round 3b – July 2006 ==
Home OR Away basis. Canada progresses directly to RWC 2007 as Americas 2. USA progresses to Round 4.

Final Standings

Country	GP	W	D	L	+/-	Pts
Canada	2	2	0	0	115	6
United States	2	1	0	1	42	4
Barbados	2	0	0	2	-157	2

Match Schedule

24 June 2006

Barbados	3 - 69	Canada

Bridgetown, Barbados

1 July 2006

United States	91 - 0	Barbados
	Report

Buck Shaw Stadium, Santa Clara, California

12 August 2006

Canada	56 - 7	United States
	Report

Swilers Rugby Park, St. John's, Newfoundland and Labrador, Canada

== Round 4 – 2006 ==
Winner (USA) progresses directly to RWC 2007 as Americas 3. Runner up (Uruguay) progresses to Repechage round as Americas 4, to play the winner of Africa 2 v Europe 4, for Repechage 1.

Match Schedule

30 September 2006

Uruguay	13 - 42	United States
	Report

Estadio Gran Parque Central, Montevideo, Uruguay
Attendance: 10,000

7 October 2006

United States	33 - 7	Uruguay
	Report

Steuber Rugby Stadium, Palo Alto, United States

United States win 75–20 on aggregate
