= St. Lucia Rugby Football Union =

- Sport: Rugby union
- Founded: 1996
- World Rugby affiliation: 1996
- Rugby Americas North affiliation: 1996
- President: Roger Butcher

St. Lucia Rugby Football Union is the governing body for rugby union in Saint Lucia. It is considered a Tier 3 rugby nation by World Rugby of which it is a full member. It is also a member of the Rugby Americas North (RAN). St. Lucia men's and women's teams compete regionally against other teams in this group.

Until 2018, the St. Lucia Rugby Football Union (SLRFU) did not have their own fields. On March 18, they acquired land opposite Sir Ira Simmons Secondary School to play matches.
