= Bermuda Rugby Football Union =

Rugby governing body in Bermuda

- Sport: Rugby union
- Founded: 1964; 62 years ago
- World Rugby affiliation: 1992

The Bermuda Rugby Football Union is the rugby governing body in Bermuda. It was founded in 1964, and joined World Rugby, known then as the IRB, in 1992. The federation oversees the Bermuda national rugby union team.

== See also ==
- Sport in Bermuda
