= British Virgin Islands national rugby union team =

The British Virgin Islands national rugby union team represents the British Virgin Islands in international rugby union. The nation are a member of the International Rugby Board (IRB) and have yet to play in a Rugby World Cup tournament. The British Virgin Islands played their first international in 1996 – losing to Barbados 17 – 0.

The British Virgin Islands compete in the NACRA Caribbean Championship, a tournament which includes Antigua, Trinidad and Tobago, the Cayman Islands, Jamaica, the Bahamas, Bermuda, and Guyana.

== Record ==
Below is a table of the representative rugby matches played by the British Virgin Islands national XV at test level up until 27 February 2026, updated after match with Turks and Caicos Islands.

Opponent	Played	Won	Lost	Drawn	% Won
Barbados	3	0	3	0	0%
Barbados A	1	0	1	0	0%
Curaçao	3	1	2	0	33.33%
Dominican Republic	4	3	1	0	75%
Puerto Rico	1	0	1	0	0%
Saint Lucia	3	2	1	0	66.67%
Saint Martin	2	1	1	0	50%
Saint Vincent and the Grenadines	3	1	2	0	33.33%
Turks and Caicos Islands	4	2	2	0	50%
U.S. Virgin Islands	3	2	1	0	66.67%
Total	27	11	16	0	40.74%

== See also ==
- Rugby union in the British Virgin Islands
