= Mexico national rugby union team =

Mexican international rugby union team

Mexico
- Nickname: Serpientes (Snakes)
- Union: Mexican Rugby Federation
- Head coach: Jeffrey CLarke
- Captain: Andres Rodriguez
First colours	Second colours

World Rugby ranking
- Current: 37 (as of 8 June 2026)
- Highest: 37 (2025, 2026)

First international
- Mexico 18–22 Cayman Islands (1985)

Biggest win
- Mexico 105–7 Cayman Islands (31 August 2019)

Biggest defeat
- Brazil 76–5 Mexico (20 April 2013)

World Cup
- Appearances: 0

The Mexico national rugby union team (Spanish: Selección nacional de rugby Mexico) represents Mexico men's international rugby union competitions, they entered the World Rugby Rankings in March 2012, ranked initially in joint 71st place with other new entrants Pakistan and the Philippines.

Mexico is one of the newest members of World Rugby, having only been participating consistently in international rugby since the late 2000s; before, the 6 games, including 2 that are not capped by the FMR. Mexico also fields a rugby sevens team, as well as female teams in both the main union game and the 7s.

The national side is ranked 37th in the world (as of 8 June 2026).

== History ==
Mexico played only four test matches before 2008. The National Team played Miami Rugby in November 1977. Mexico's first test match was in 1985, an 18–22 loss against the Cayman Islands. This match was followed by 2 games against Colombia in 1996 (a 46-12 victory and a 10-10 draw), and two losses in 2001 and 2002 against Cayman Islands.

=== 2011 RWC qualifying ===
Mexico's first official test match, and first participation in Rugby World Cup qualifying, was in March 2008. In that match, Mexico secured a 47-7 victory over Saint Vincent and the Grenadines in 2011 Rugby World Cup qualifying. Mexico's record in qualifying was 2-2, finishing 6th place in Round 1A of the Americas qualification zone.

=== 2015 RWC qualifying ===
A record crowd for a rugby match in Mexico saw the home team dispatch Jamaica 68–14 in Mexico City in front of more than 2,000 vociferous fans at the Universidad Iberoamericana. This match opened their NACRA Caribbean Championship account, and also doubled as the opening Rugby World Cup 2015 qualification match. However, Mexico lost its next qualifying match 13–46 against the Cayman Islands, ending its 2015 Rugby World Cup qualifying campaign.

=== 2019 RWC qualifying ===
Mexico played qualifying matches for the 2019 World Cup during 2016. They won all three of their first-round Americas North (North Zone) group stage games (against the Cayman Islands, Bermuda, and The Bahamas), and also won the first round final against South Zone winners, Guyana. As such, they were named champions of the 2016 Rugby Americas North Championship.

From here, they progressed to a one-off play-off game against the 2016 CONSUR "B" Rugby Championship, Colombia, which they lost 29-11, ending Mexico's qualifying campaign.

=== 2025 RAN Champions ===
Mexico beat Jamaica in the RAN semi-final 37-24 on May 3, 2025, and beat Trinidad and Tobago 45-14 on June 21, 2025. This was a historical win as Mexico was able to achieve 37th in World Rugby Rankings, the highest ever recorded ranking, and now able to quality against higher ranked South American and Europe teams.

== Honors ==
RAN Championship

- Champions: (2) 2016, 2025
- Runners-up: 2015

RAN Cup

- Champions: (1) 2014

Americas Rugby Challenge

- Runners-up: (1) 2019
- Third place: (1) 2018

== Rankings ==
Event	Rank	Date	Ref
Highest ranking	37	June 2025	
Current ranking	38	February 2026	
Lowest ranking	75	2013	
Initial ranking	71	March 2012	

== Record ==
Below is a table of the representative rugby matches played by a Mexico national XV at test level up until 6 June 2026, updated after the match with Trinidad and Tobago.

Team	Mat	Won	Lost	Draw	%	For	Aga	Diff
Arizona State Sun Devils	1	1	0	0	100%	30	23	+7
Bahamas	4	2	2	0	50%	101	61	+40
Barbados	1	0	1	0	0%	20	21	-1
Bermuda	3	2	1	0	66.67%	141	43	+98
Brazil	2	0	2	0	0%	19	126	-107
Cayman Islands	13	8	5	0	61.54%	372	259	+113
Colombia	7	1	5	1	14.29%	140	243	-103
Croatia	1	1	0	0	100%	33	17	+16
Czech Republic	1	0	1	0	0%	27	54	-27
Jamaica	3	3	0	0	100%	139	46	+83
Paraguay	2	1	0	1	50%	71	72	-1
Saint Vincent and the Grenadines	1	1	0	0	100%	47	7	+40
Turks and Caicos Islands	1	1	0	0	100%	96	0	+96
Trinidad and Tobago	3	2	0	1	66.67%	85	57	+28
(United States) USA South	4	3	1	0	75%	134	113	+21
Total	47	26	20	1	55.32%	1535	1181	+354

== Current squad ==
Mexico squad for the 2019 Rugby World Cup qualification match against Colombia.

Backs
Player	Position	Club
Andrés Rodríguez	Scrum-half	(Mexico) Black Thunder RFC
Christian Alvarez	Fly-half	(United States) Austin Huns RFC
Luc Martin	Centre	(Mexico) Tazmania Rugby
Brandon Arriaga	Centre	(United States) Miami Tridents RFC
Connor Olvera	Centre	(United States) Utah Warriors Academy
Diego Sanchez	Wing	(Mexico)
Fharid Samano	Wing	(Mexico) Cumiyais Monterrey RFC
Yeudiel Suro	Wing	(Mexico) Cumiyais Monterrey RFC
Rodrigo Ripoll	Fullback	(Mexico) Querétaro Roosters Rugby
Agustín Sánchez	Fullback	(Mexico) Hammerheads Cancún
Pascual Nadal	Fullback	(Mexico) Black Thunder RFC

Forwards
Player	Position	Club
Alberto Mizael Loredo Reta	Hooker	(Mexico) Cumiyais Monterrey RC
Marcos Flegmann	Prop	(United States) Boston RFC
Maximiliano Douek	Prop	(Mexico) Tazmania RFC
Jesús Rico	Prop	(Mexico) Cumiyais Monterrey RC
Erick Castillo	Second row	(Mexico) Black Thunder RFC
Santiago Prieto Ledesma	second row	(Mexico) Black Thunder RFC
José Raúl Reyes	Flanker	(Mexico) Cumiyais Monterrey RC
Gonzalo Ponce	Flanker	(Mexico) Black Thunder RFC
Alberto Ruiz	Flanker	(Mexico) Wallabies RFC
Santiago Leboreiro	Flanker	(Mexico) Black Thunder RFC
Simon Pierre	Number eight	(Mexico) Tazmania RC

== See also ==
- Rugby union in Mexico
- Mexican Rugby Federation
- Mexico national rugby sevens team
