= Saint Vincent and the Grenadines national rugby union team =

Saint Vincent and the Grenadines
- Nickname: Amazona Guildingii
- Union: St. Vincent and the Grenadines Rugby Union
- Head coach: Hendrikus Wentzel
First colours

World Rugby ranking
- Current: 82 (as of 9 November 2026)
- Highest: 79 (23 November 2020)

First international
- St. Vincent & Gren. 25–36 Saint Lucia; 28 May 2005

Biggest win
- British Virgin Is. 22–24 St. Vincent & Gren. 17 May 2014

Biggest defeat
- Barbados 51–0 St. Vincent & Gren. 21 April 2012
- Website: svgrugbyunion.weebly.com

Saint Vincent and the Grenadines represents Saint Vincent and the Grenadines in international rugby union as the men's national team. It is ranked 81st in the world, as of 16 January 2023.

== History ==
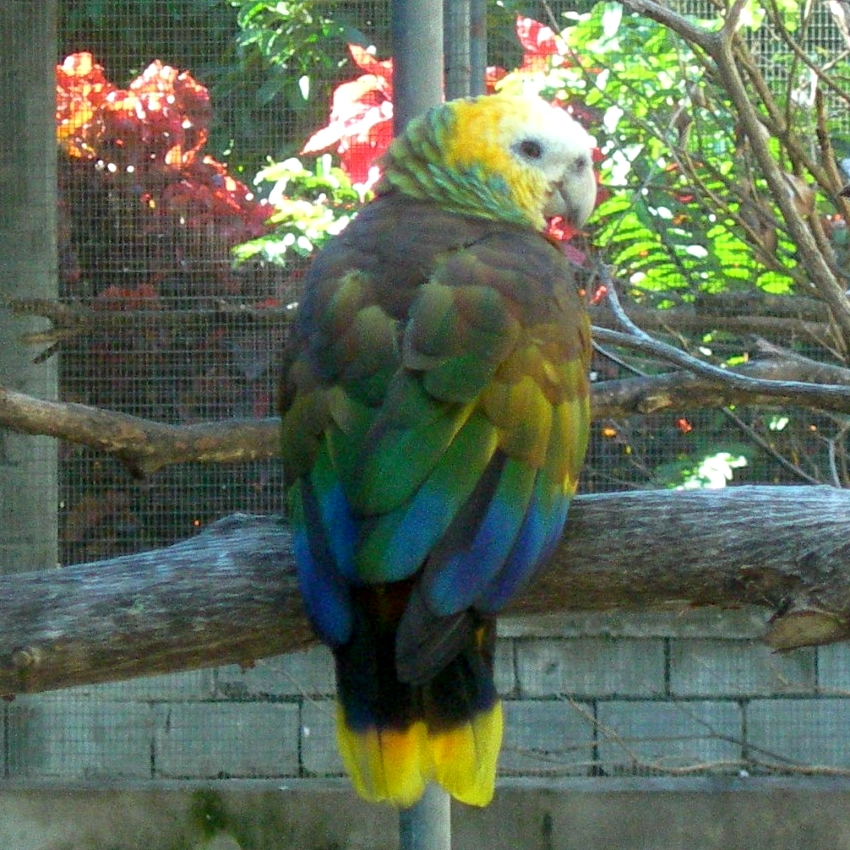
A Saint Vincent parrot (Amazona Guildingii)

The St. Vincent and the Grenadines Rugby Union (SVGRU) came into existence on Sunday 18 January 1998, when the first game of touch rugby was played at the Sion Hill playing field using four traffic cones as pitch markers.

It all came about following a chance conversation. This stimulated an expatriate Englishman, John Townend, to return form his Christmas vacation in 1997 with plenty of enthusiasm and two rugby balls. John Townend contacted two Antipodean expatriates: Kelly Glass, a highly accomplished rugby player from South Island, New Zealand, and Geoff Hyde, an Australian tourism adviser, suggesting a game of touch rugby the following Sunday morning. There were seven players at the first game: Carver Alexander, Ernst De Freitas, Kelly Glass, Kirk Hobson-Garcia, Geoff Hyde, John Townend and Delon Williams, a local Rastafarian who later became known as “Speedy”.

After playing for two hours, the group retired to Villa Beach with a crate of beer, to re-hydrate (any excuse would do) and to soothe aching muscles in the sea. Rugby had been introduced to St. Vincent.

From the early days there was an interest from girls, who took an instant liking to the idea of “touch” rugby. The games then continued every Sunday, and it was soon found that between Kirk, Kelly, Andrew, and Scott Hadley that there were already some players on the island. In addition, they were able to attract other good players, namely Derek Hadley who was visiting from Australia and Father Pope Faifal from Samoa, working with the Catholic mission. In terms of the girls, Jackie De Freitas soon joined, together with some Canadian volunteers, namely Janice Madill and Lisa Lilajehto. One other girl who was to become a big favourite was Loretta “Hot Lips” Skrok. She became notorious for her trick of taking a swig of strong rum and “flame throwing” at parties. Peace Corps Volunteers Becky Buster and Maria Caluag also became great team members. The local ranks were swelled by the contribution of Lorna “Turbo” Williams from Overland in the Carib community, Delia King from Calliaqua and Yvonne Bakker from Kingstown.

In the early days they were definitely seen as an expatriate group of Americans, Australians, British, Canadians, New Zealanders, Trinidadians, Samoans, and a few Vincentians. Rugby was definitely perceived as a white man's sport and a relatively rough game at that. It was soon expanded to playing on Wednesday afternoons as the numbers rose and transferred Sunday practices to Saturday. Despite the expatriate character it was the Vincentians, notably Andrew Hadley and Jackie De Freitas who took the early lead in developing the club, with help from Geoff Hyde.

SVG Rugby has a significant history of developing home grown talent. In the amateur era the female structure was highly successful, producing a large number of first team players and internationals. In the transition to the professional era it was recognized that a clear development program was needed to develop “complete” players capable of playing professional rugby at the highest level. A key difference between amateur and professional rugby is the physical demands placed on players.

They decided to call the team Amazona Guildingii after the rare and graceful Vincentian parrot, and selected the national colours of green, yellow and blue for their jerseys and shorts. Soon afterwards those that could afford it, purchased their own uniforms. Their motto is to "Strive to excellence and keep on striving til the end."

== Matches and results ==
The first game ever played was against the British Royal Navy destroyer HMS Newcastle, on 8 February 1998. The game was won by the home side.

Saint Vincent and the Grenadines attempted to qualify for the 2007 Rugby World Cup in France, playing the first match of the Americas qualifying tournament. They played a preliminary qualifier against Saint Lucia in May 2005. The winner would progress to the South Pool of Round 1a, however, Saint Lucia won the match 36-25.

On March 29, 2008, Saint Vincent was defeated by Mexico 47-7 in a pre-qualifier for the right to enter the NAWIRA region qualifying process for Rugby World Cup 2011.

== World Cup record ==
- 1987 – No qualifying tournament held
- 1991–2003 – Did not enter
- 2007 – Did not qualify
- 2011 – Did not qualify
- 2015 – Did not qualify
- 2019 – Did not qualify

== Record ==
Below is a table of the representative rugby matches played by a Saint Vincent and the Grenadines national XV at test level up until 30 May 2026, updated after match with Barbados.

Opponent	Played	Won	Lost	Drawn	% Won
Barbados	4	0	4	0	0%
British Virgin Islands	3	1	2	0	33.33%
Curaçao	3	0	2	1	0%
Grenada	1	1	0	0	100%
Jamaica	1	0	1	0	0%
Mexico	1	0	1	0	0%
Saint Lucia	8	3	5	0	37.5%
Total	21	5	15	1	23.81%

== Squad ==
Squad to 2012 NACRA Championship 23 June 2012

Squad: Anthony Joseph; Kemi Francois; Shoji Cornelis; Rohan Glasgow; Kimron Barnum; Guy Hadley; Ricardo Dallaway (c); Dugal James; Delroy Diamond; Phillip Alvis; Chaz Rawlins; Leonard Matthews; Odonza Dennie; Kevin Bailey; Godfrey Matthews	Substitutes: Ronald James; Justin Jogles; Joe Hepburn; Seymour Browne; Gilan Comas; Kemron Omri Thomas; Ricky Haynes

== See also ==
- 2011 Rugby World Cup - Americas qualification
