= Saint Lucia national rugby union team =

Rugby organization in Saint Lucia

Saint Lucia
- Nickname: The Lucians
- Union: St. Lucia Rugby Football Union
- Head coach: Joe O'Donnell
- Captain: Sergio Creggy
- Top scorer: Tom Hotan (132)
First colours

World Rugby ranking
- Current: 100 (as of 4 November 2024)

First international
- Saint Lucia 45–25 Saint Vincent (28 May 2005)

Biggest win
- Saint Lucia 45–25 Saint Vincent (28 May 2005)

Biggest defeat
- Guyana 97–0 Saint Lucia (10 August 2005)

The Saint Lucia national rugby union team represents Saint Lucia in the sport of rugby union. Saint Lucia have thus far not played in a Rugby World Cup, but have participated in qualifying tournaments. They are classed as a tier-three nation by World Rugby.

== History ==
Saint Lucia played their first international friendly in 2008 against Dominican Republic, which they lost 16-12 with tries coming from Tom Hotan and Andy Bucana. They won their first ever match in 3 years against Cayman Islands 33-0. They also reached the quarter-finals of the American Rugby Cup. They were knocked out by Brazil 25-3. They were also defeated 87-0 by Canada, whose team featured James Pritchard, Connor Braid and Tyler Ardron. They lost 52-5 against Uruguay and Chile.

== Record ==
Below is a table of the representative rugby matches played by a Greece national XV at test level up until 30 May 2026, updated after match with Jamaica.

Opponent	Played	Won	Lost	Drawn	% Won
Barbados	4	0	4	0	0%
Bermuda	1	0	1	0	0%
British Virgin Islands	3	1	2	0	33.33%
Curaçao	3	1	2	0	50%
Guyana	2	0	2	0	0%
Jamaica	1	0	1	0	0%
Saint Vincent and the Grenadines	8	5	3	0	62.5%
Trinidad and Tobago	2	0	2	0	0%
Total	24	7	17	0	29.17%

== See also ==
- Rugby union in Saint Lucia
