= Guyana national rugby union team =

Guyana
- Union: Guyana Rugby Football Union
- Head coach: Lowrance Adonis
- Captain: Richard Staglon
First colours

World Rugby ranking
- Current: 74 (as of 8 June 2026)
- Highest: 56 (13 December 2021)

First international
- Trinidad and Tobago 17–5 Guyana (Kingston; 31 October 1961)

Biggest win
- Guyana 97–0 Saint Lucia (Port of Spain, Trinidad and Tobago; 10 August 2005)

Biggest defeat
- Guyana 7–86 Paraguay (Medellín, Colombia; 29 August 2018)

The Guyana national rugby union team represents Guyana in the sport of rugby union. They have thus far not qualified for a Rugby World Cup but have participated in qualifying tournaments.

== History ==
Guyana made their international debut in Georgetown in 1979 in a match against Bermuda, which Bermuda won. They played Bermuda again in 1981 in the Port of Spain. The team got their first win in 1999 in Georgetown, defeating Martinique seven points to three. The team competed in the Americas qualifying tournaments for qualification for the 2003 Rugby World Cup in Australia, including fixtures against Cayman Islands.

Guyana competes in the Caribbean Championship, a tournament which includes Antigua, Trinidad and Tobago, the Cayman Islands, Jamaica, the Bahamas, British Virgin Islands, and Bermuda.

Guyana attempted to qualify for the 2007 Rugby World Cup in France in 2005, contesting the Americas tournament in Round 1a. Guyana were grouped in the South Pool, alongside Barbados, Trinidad and Tobago and Saint Lucia. Guyana won two of their three fixtures, finishing in second place in the final standings.

In 2003, Guyana's u-18 team won the Caribbean championship and went on to win it the following two years, losing it to Jamaica on points in Guyana in 2006 and losing in the final of the u-20 World Cup qualifier in the Cayman Islands 2007 to Jamaica, who won on drop goals after the match went tied after extra time.

Guyana will participate in the 2010 Commonwealth Games in Delhi, having won the NACRA qualifying tournament in Mexico in November 2009. The side was captained by Claudius Butts, with Theodore Henry taking over when Butts was injured in the buildup to Mexico.

The side are currently coached by Larry Adonis and Clinton Clarke, with West Indies coach Joe Whipple acting as a technical director.

The team is sponsored by X-Treme Rugby, a Thailand-based company owned by former Canadian International player (50 caps), Eddie Evans. Eddie also runs charity called Nakk Suu, designed to help teach the game of rugby to kids in Thailand.

Guyanese rugby is regularly supported by the BOOST Coaching Programme based at Loughborough University, U.K, with 2 coaches travelling to spend a month with the union once a year. One coach then comes to Loughborough in return, normally in February or March.

== Record ==
Below is a table of the representative rugby matches played by a Guyana national XV at test level up until 6 June 2026, updated after match with Barbados.

Opponent	Played	Won	Lost	Drawn	% Won
Bahamas	3	2	1	0	66.67%
Barbados	19	11	6	2	57.89%
Bermuda	8	1	7	0	12.5%
Cayman Islands	4	0	4	0	0%
Colombia	1	0	1	0	0%
Guadeloupe	2	0	2	0	0%
Jamaica	11	6	3	2	54.55%
Martinique	5	3	2	0	60%
Mexico	2	0	2	0	0%
Paraguay	1	0	1	0	0%
Saint Lucia	2	2	0	0	100%
Trinidad and Tobago	30	13	16	1	43.33%
USA Selects	2	1	1	0	50%
Total	90	39	46	5	43.33%

== Squad ==
Guyana squad at the 2015 NACRA Rugby Championship:

Players	Position	Club
Rondell McArthur	Prop	UG Wolves
Jason Tyrell	Prop	Pepsi Hornets
Delroy Gordon	Prop	Pepsi Hornets
Jacques Archibald	Prop	UG Wolves
Troy Arjoon	Prop /Hooker	Brooklyn Rugby Club
Rickford Cummings	Hooker	Pepsi Hornets
Dwayne Schroeder	Lock	GDF
Vallon Adams	Lock	Rockaway Fish Head, NY
Kevon David	Lock	Yamaha Caribs
Richard Staglon	Flanker	Trinidad Caribs
Jamal Angus	Flanker	UG Wolves
Cloyd J. Prowell	No. 8	GDF
Ryan Gonsalves	Scrum half	Pepsi Hornets
Leon Greaves	Scrum half	Pepsi Hornets
Peabo Hamilton	Fly Half	Trinidad Northern
Lancelot Adonis	Fly Half/Full Back	UG Wolves
Theodore Henry	Center	Yamaha Caribs
Kevin McKenzie	Center	Sunshine Coast Falcons, Brisbane
Randy James	Center/Wing	Woodland Rugby Club, Texas
Claudius Butts	Wing	Trinidad Harvard
Avery Corbin	Wing	GDF
Blaise Bailey	Wing	Pepsi Hornets
Ronald Mayers	Full back	Trinidad Northern

Officials

- Kenneth Grant-Stuart - Coach
- Robin Roberts - Manager
- Abiola Blair - Physiotherapist

=== Previous Squads ===
Squad to 2012 NACRA Championship 23 June 2012

- Jason Tyrell
- Allain Crawford
- Rondell McArthur
- Vallon Adams
- Clyde Prowell
- Dwayne Schroeder
- Richard Staglon
- Dillion Downer
- Ryan Gonsalves (C)
- Christopher Singh
- Ronald Mayers
- Theodore Henry
- Peabo Hamilton
- Claudius Butts
- Ryan Hinkson

Substitutes

- Delroy Gordon
- Troy Arjoon
- Elwin Chase
- Rickford Cummings
- Walter George
- Claude Alexander
- Avery Corbin

Coach

- Theodore Henry

== See also ==
- Rugby union in Guyana
