= Trinidad and Tobago national rugby union team =

Trinidad and Tobago
- Nickname: The Calypso Warriors
- Union: Trinidad & Tobago Rugby Football Union
- Head coach: Larry Mendes
- Captain: Adam Frederick
First colours

World Rugby ranking
- Current: 51 (as of 8 June 2026)
- Highest: 49 (2026)

First international
- (Trinidad and Tobago) Trinidad & Tobago 8-42 Bermuda (1979)

Biggest win
- (Saint Lucia) St Lucia 8-82 Trinidad & Tobago (Trinidad and Tobago) (8 August 2005)

Biggest defeat
- Bermuda 78 - 5 Trinidad & Tobago (Trinidad and Tobago) (17 May 1994)

The Trinidad and Tobago national rugby union team has thus far not qualified for the Rugby World Cup but has participated in qualifying tournaments since 1999. They are classed as a tier-three nation by World Rugby.

The national side is ranked 51st in the world, as of 8 June 2026.

== History ==
Trinidad and Tobago played their first ever rugby international in 1979 in Georgetown against Bermuda. Trinidad and Tobago lost the contest 8 points to 42. Trinidad and Tobago attempted to qualify for the 1999 Rugby World Cup in Wales. Their first match of the Americas qualifying tournament was a one-off Round 1 match against Brazil in Port of Spain. Trinidad and Tobago won the game 41 points to nil and advanced to Round 2, where they faced Chile and Bermuda in a pool series. Trinidad and Tobago lost their first match 6-35 against Chile, and lost their second against Bermuda 52-6, and were knocked out of the qualifying tournaments.

The team were involved in qualifying tournaments for the 2003 Rugby World Cup in Australia as well, participating in the Round 1 Americas tournament. The team defeated Jamaica 51-5 in their first match, and went on to win 12-8 over the Cayman Islands in their second game. Trinidad and Tobago then won their third match 23-12 over Bermuda to advance to Round 2. There the team was narrowly defeated 10-11 by Brazil, and then nil to 9 in the second match, and Trinidad and Tobago were knocked out of the tournament.

In 2005 Trinidad and Tobago participated in qualifying tournaments for the 2007 Rugby World Cup in France. They were grouped in the South of the pool of Round 1a along with Barbados, Guyana and Saint Lucia. Trinidad and Tobago won their first match 82-8 over Saint Lucia, though they lost to Barbados and Guyana, finishing third in the pool which ended their qualifying campaign.

Trinidad and Tobago compete in the Caribbean Championship, a tournament which includes Antigua, Bermuda, the Cayman Islands, Jamaica, the Bahamas, British Virgin Islands, and Guyana.

Trinidad and Tobago win in the Caribbean Cup made them advance to the next round of the 2011 Rugby World Cup qualification, where they had to face Brazil. The "Calypso Warriors" faced the notorious improvement of their South Americans counterparts and they lost both games, 31-8 at home and 24-12 away, ending their hopes to qualify again.

In 2015, Trinidad and Tobago won the NACRA Rugby Championship, defeating Mexico 30-16 in the final.

== Results ==
=== World Cup ===
- 1987 - Not invited
- 1991 - 1995 - Did not enter
- 1999 - 2015 - Did not qualify

=== NACRA / Rugby Americas North ===
- Champions in 1967, 1973, 1983, 1985, 1997, 1999 (co-champions), 2001, 2008, 2015.

=== Overall ===
Below is a table of the representative rugby matches played by a Trinidad and Tobago national XV at test level up until 6 June 2026, updated after match with Mexico.

| Opponent | Played | Won | Lost | Drawn | % Won |
|---|---|---|---|---|---|
| Bahamas | 5 | 3 | 2 | 0 | 60% |
| Barbados | 22 | 19 | 2 | 1 | 86.36% |
| Bermuda | 9 | 4 | 5 | 0 | 44.44% |
| Bahamas | 10 | 8 | 2 | 0 | 80% |
| Brazil | 5 | 1 | 4 | 0 | 20% |
| Cayman Islands | 3 | 3 | 0 | 0 | 100% |
| Chile | 1 | 0 | 1 | 0 | 0% |
| Guadeloupe | 4 | 4 | 0 | 0 | 100% |
| Guyana | 31 | 17 | 13 | 1 | 54.84% |
| Jamaica | 15 | 12 | 2 | 1 | 80% |
| Martinique | 13 | 8 | 5 | 0 | 61.54% |
| Mexico | 3 | 1 | 2 | 0 | 33.33% |
| Saint Lucia | 2 | 2 | 0 | 0 | 100% |
| USA Selects | 3 | 1 | 2 | 0 | 33.33% |
| Venezuela | 3 | 3 | 0 | 0 | 100% |
| Total | 119 | 78 | 38 | 3 | 65.55% |

== See also ==
- Rugby union in Trinidad and Tobago
- Trinidad and Tobago Rugby Football Union
- Trinidad and Tobago national rugby sevens team
- Trinidad and Tobago women's national rugby union team
