= Bahamas national rugby union team =

Bahamas
First colours

World Rugby ranking
- Current: 103 (as of 4 November 2024)
- Highest: 102 (2024)

First international
- Bahamas 6 - 6 Jamaica (19 April 1965)

Biggest win
- Dominican Republic 5–40 Bahamas (Santo Domingo, Dominican Republic; 3 June 2017)

Biggest defeat
- Barbados 52–3 Bahamas (Port of Spain, Trinidad and Tobago; 1 October 2005)

The Bahamas national rugby union team represent the Bahamas in the sport of rugby union. The team have thus far not qualified for a Rugby World Cup, but have participated in qualifying tournament. The nation is classified as tier three by the International Rugby Board (IRB).

== History ==
The Bahamas made their international debut on March 22, 1997 in a match against Bermuda. Bermuda won the contest 24 points to 3. The Bahamas played Barbados that April, and in the process won their first international; defeating Barbados 37-23. The team played three internationals during October 1998; although the Bahamas lost all three games, against Bermuda, Trinidad & Tobago and Jamaica.

The Bahamas compete in the Caribbean Championship, a tournament which includes Antigua, Trinidad and Tobago, the Cayman Islands, Jamaica, the Bermuda, British Virgin Islands, and Guyana.

They played a one-off international in 2001, losing to Barbados 18 points to 25. Another international was played in June 2003, where they lost 7 to 13 to the Cayman Islands. The Bahamas took part in the Americas qualifying tournaments for the 2007 Rugby World Cup in France. They won their first two matches, defeating the Cayman Islands and Bermuda, but lost their third against Jamaica. However, they did finish at the top of the Northern Pool, clinching the play-off match against the winner of the other pool. The Bahamas lost to Barbados in the play-off match, 52-3.

== Record ==
Below is a table of the representative rugby matches played by a Bahamas national XV at test level up until 6 June 2026, updated after match with Turks and Caicos Islands.

Opponent	Played	Won	Lost	Drawn	% Won
Barbados	6	3	2	1	50%
Bermuda	11	2	9	0	18.18%
Cayman Islands	7	1	6	0	14.29%
Cayman Islands A	2	1	1	0	50%
Dominican Republic	1	1	0	0	100%
Guadeloupe	1	1	0	0	100%
Guyana	3	1	2	0	33.33%
Jamaica	11	3	7	1	27.27%
Martinique	1	1	0	0	100%
Mexico	4	2	2	0	50%
Trinidad and Tobago	4	1	3	0	25%
Turks and Caicos Islands	5	4	1	0	80%
USA Selects	3	0	3	0	0%
Total	60	21	37	2	35%

== World Cup record ==
- 1987 - Did not enter
- 1991 - Did not enter
- 1995 - Did not enter
- 1999 - Did not qualify
- 2003 - Did not qualify
- 2007 - Did not qualify
- 2011 - Did not qualify
- 2015 - Did not qualify

== Squad ==
Squad to 2012 NACRA Championship 26 May 2012

Squad: Craig Anthony; Charles Smith; Manny Roussos; John Gates; Marcus Cheetham; Justin Cunningham; Shawn Kemp; Devon Woodside; Kevin Salabie; Jeremico Cooper (c); Michael Watkins; Jamie Anthony; Duran Beadle; Carlton Oliver; Jamaal Curry	Substitutes: Garfield Morrison; Earl Thurston; Bovair Davis; Kacy Charlton; Dorian Butler; Giovanni Johnson; Levar Boyd; Coach: Ken Hutton
