= Jamaica national rugby union team =

Jamaica
- Nickname: Jamaica Crocs
- Union: Jamaica Rugby Football Union
- Head coach: Lucas Roy-Smith
First colours

World Rugby ranking
- Current: 61 (as of 8 June 2026)
- Lowest: 67 (23 November 2020)

First international
- Jamaica 6-3 Trinidad and Tobago (27 November 1960)

Biggest win
- Jamaica 80-0 Saint Lucia (30 May 2026)

Biggest defeat
- Jamaica 5-69 Trinidad and Tobago (12 October 1998)

World Cup
- Appearances: 0

The Jamaica national rugby union team represents Jamaica in the sport of rugby union. The team has thus far not qualified for a Rugby World Cup but has participated in qualifying tournaments.

The national side is ranked 61st in the world (as of 8 June 2026).

== History ==
Jamaica played their first rugby international in 1960 losing 3-6 in a match with Trinidad and Tobago.

Jamaica competes in the Caribbean Championship, a tournament which includes Antigua, Trinidad and Tobago, the Cayman Islands, Bermuda, the Bahamas, British Virgin Islands, and Guyana.

Jamaica took part in qualifying for the 2003 Rugby World Cup. They were knocked out of Round 1 (North) of the Americas tournaments by Trinidad and Tobago, losing 51 to 5.

They attempted to qualify for the 2007 Rugby World Cup in June/July 2005. Jamaica drew their first game 10-all against Bermuda, but lost the second match against the Cayman Islands 8-18. They won their last game 5-3 over the Bahamas, and finished third in the group.

Jamaica entered the 2011 Rugby World Cup qualifiers, but lost to Guyana by 10-3, and were once again knocked out of the competition.

== Record ==
Below is a table of the representative rugby matches played by a Jamaica national XV at test level up until 30 May 2026, updated after match with Saint Lucia.

Opponent	Played	Won	Lost	Drawn	% Won
Bahamas	11	7	3	1	63.64%
Barbados	8	5	3	0	62.5%
Bermuda	7	1	5	1	14.29%
Cayman Islands	12	2	10	0	16.67%
Gibraltar	2	0	2	0	0%
Guyana	11	3	6	2	27.27%
Martinique	2	2	0	0	100%
Mexico	3	0	3	0	0%
Norway	1	1	0	0	100%
Saint Lucia	1	1	0	0	100%
Saint Vincent and the Grenadines	1	1	0	0	100%
Trinidad and Tobago	15	2	12	1	13.33%
Turks and Caicos Islands	2	2	0	0	100%
USA Selects	2	0	2	0	0%
Total	78	26	57	5	33.33%

== World Cup record ==
- 1987 - Did not qualify
- 1991 - 1999 - Did not qualify
- 2003 - 2015 - Did not qualify
- 2019 - Did not qualify
- 2023 - Did not qualify

== See also ==
- Rugby union in Jamaica
