= Bermuda national rugby union team =

- Union: Bermuda Rugby Football Union
- Head coach: Jamie Barnwell
- Captain: Tom Greenslade
First colours

World Rugby ranking
- Current: 71 (as of 4 November 2024)
- Highest: 68 (23 November 2020)

First international
- Bermuda 16 - 10 Jamaica (1975)

Biggest win
- Bermuda 78 - 5 Trinidad and Tobago (17 May 1994)

Biggest defeat
- Mexico 75 - 10 Bermuda (21 May 2016)

The Bermuda national rugby union team represents Bermuda in the sport of rugby union. Bermuda are the current Caribbean Champions 2019 although they have thus far not played in a Rugby World Cup, but have participated in qualifying tournaments.

== History ==
Bermuda first played in qualifying tournaments for a Rugby World Cup in the Americas tournaments for the 1995 Rugby World Cup in South Africa. Bermuda were eliminated from North-Round 1, losing 3 points to 60 to the United States. Bermuda attempted to qualify for the 1999 Rugby World Cup in Wales as well, participating in Group 2 of Round 1 Americas qualifying, where they finished at the top of their pool after defeating both the Bahamas and Barbados, and advancing to Round 2. They defeated Trinidad and Tobago in their first match, but then lost to Chile, and finished second, ending their qualifying run.

Bermuda competes in the Caribbean Championship, a tournament which includes Antigua, Trinidad and Tobago, the Cayman Islands, Jamaica, the Bahamas, British Virgin Islands, and Guyana.

They competed in the North group of the Round 1 of the Americas tournaments in qualifying for the 2003 Rugby World Cup in Australia. They were however knocked out by Trinidad and Tobago and did not advance to Round 2. They drew 10-all against Jamaica in the qualifying tournaments for the 2007 Rugby World Cup in France but did not advance.

They won the North group in the qualifying tournaments for the 2015 Rugby World Cup and defeat Guyana but in the next round were eliminated by Paraguay in Asunción.

== Record ==
Below is a table of the representative rugby matches played by a Bermuda national XV at test level up until 15 May 2026, updated after match with Cayman Islands.

Opponent	Played	Won	Lost	Drawn	% Won
Bahamas	11	9	2	0	81.82%
Barbados	5	5	0	0	100%
Canada U21	1	0	1	0	0%
Cayman Islands	15	4	11	0	26.67%
Cayman Islands A	1	1	1	0	100%
Chile	1	0	1	0	0%
Florida	1	1	0	0	100%
Gibraltar	1	1	0	0	100%
Guadeloupe	3	3	0	0	100%
Guyana	8	7	1	0	87.5%
Jamaica	7	5	1	1	71.43%
Luxembourg	1	1	0	0	100%
Martinique	5	4	0	1	80%
Martinique A	1	1	0	0	100%
Mexico	3	1	2	0	33.33%
Mexico A	1	0	1	0	0%
Paraguay	1	0	1	0	0%
Saint Lucia	1	1	0	0	100%
Trinidad and Tobago	9	5	4	0	55.56%
Trinidad and Tobago A	1	1	0	0	100%
Turks and Caicos Islands	1	1	0	0	100%
United States	1	0	1	0	0%
USA Selects	5	0	5	0	0%
Total	84	51	31	2	60.71%

== Squad ==
Squad to 2012 NACRA Championship 23 June 2012

Squad: Paul Dobinson; Thomas Greenslade; Dustin Archibald; David Rourke; Dereck Hurdle; Andrew Hook; Henry Paddison; Peter Dunkerley (c); Thomas Healey; Ian Henderson; Jack Ellison; Paull Davis; Tom Edwards; Neville Zuill; David Pringle	Substitutes: Jahan Cedenio; Mike Williams; Aldo Campbell; Tony Ward; Darren Richardson; Steven Husbands; Chris Naylor

== Bermuda International Select XV Squad ==
Squad to face Saracens on May 31, 2013 as part of Saracens tour around Bermuda to promote Caribbean rugby.

Head Coach: (England) Lewis Moody

Player	Position	Union
George Chuter	Hooker	England
Hanyani Shimange	Hooker	South Africa
Creag Johnston	Prop	Canada
Owen Parfrey	Prop	Canada
Nick Wallace	Prop	United States
Scott Dunham	Lock	Canada
Aaron Flagg	Lock	Canada
Graham Harriman	Lock	United States
Cam Pierce	Lock	Canada
Derek Asbun	Flanker	United States
Pete Dunlop	Flanker	Bermuda
Ben Green	Flanker	Bermuda
Anton van Zyl	Flanker	South Africa
Simon Taylor	Number 8	Scotland
Shaun Perry	Scrum-half	England
Mike Petri	Scrum-half	United States
Andrew Ferguson	Fly-half	Canada
Zachary Pangelinan	Fly-half	United States
Fuailefau Michael Suatia	Centre	Canada
Patrick Parfrey	Centre	Canada
Mike Scholz	Centre	Canada
John Quigley	Centre	Bermuda
Tony Ward	Centre	Bermuda
Gcobani Bobo	Wing	South Africa
Dan Cole	Wing	Bermuda
Geordan Murphy (c)	Full-back	Ireland

=== Match Day ===
31 May 2013
18:30 AST (UTC-4)

Bermuda Intl. Select XV	21 – 55	(England) Saracens

Bermuda National Stadium, Hamilton
Referee: Ian Tempest (England)

== See also ==
- Rugby union in Bermuda
