= Barbados national rugby union team =

Barbados
- Union: Barbados Rugby Football Union
- Head coach: Romeo Mayers
- Captain: Stephen Millar
First colours

World Rugby ranking
- Current: 59 (as of 11 June 2026)
- Highest: 59 (11 June 2026)
- Lowest: 83 (16 January 2023)

First international
- British Virgin Islands 0 – 10 Barbados (1996-06-15)

Biggest win
- Barbados 81 – 0 Saint Lucia (2005-08-13)

Biggest defeat
- United States 91 – 0 Barbados (2006-01-07)

The Barbados national rugby union team represents Barbados at the sport of rugby union. Barbados has been playing international rugby union since the mid-1990s. They have thus far not qualified for a Rugby World Cup. Barbados has also hosted the Caribbean Championship.

The national side is ranked 62nd in the world, as of 8 June 2026.

== History ==
Rugby union had a long history in Barbados, though there was originally only the one team, called the Barbados Rugby Union. In 1995 the union affiliated to the International Rugby Board (IRB).

Barbados made their international debut against the British Virgin Islands in 1996. Barbados won the match 10 to nil thanks to the heroics of Aidan "Irish" Kelleher now considered amongst the greatest player Barbados has ever had represent their country. They played three games the following year: losing to the Bahamas, Bermuda and Martinique. They played Trinidad & Tobago in 1999, losing nil to 15.

In 2001 they played the Bahamas again, defeating them 18 to 25, though they lost to Bermuda in their following fixture. In 2005 Barbados began their campaign to qualify for the 2007 Rugby World Cup in France, in the Round 1a of the Americas group. Competing in the South Pool, and won all three of their fixtures, defeating Guyana, Trinidad and Tobago and St Lucia. Barbados finished at the top of their pool, sending them into a play-off match against the winner of the South Pool, the Bahamas. Played in Trinidad, Barbados defeated the Bahamas 52 to three. This sent them through to Round 3b, where they would play in a pool with Canada and the USA. Barbados lost both of their games, exiting the World Cup qualifiers.

During the qualification for the 2011 World Cup, Barbados was eliminated after a heavy defeat by Trinidad and Tobago.

== Current squad ==
Squad as current as 7 November 2015

Squad: Antonio Gibbons; Jeren Clarke; Kemar Holder – Edghill; Kevin Murrell; Raj Edwards; Enrique Oxley; Jermaine Bynoe; Stephen Millar (c); Nico Blunt; Kevin Carter; Kevin Cobham; Troy Grant; Nicholas Jackman; Dario Stoute; Brandon Walcott	Substitutes: Runako Padmore; Kean Blackman; Daniel Ramsey; Romeo Mayers; Anquan Lynch; Romel Moore; Marlo Sandiford; Adon Rodgers

== Past Players ==
Squad

- Henderson Reid
- Leandro Jordan
- Dwight Ford
- Benjamin Petit
- Marlo Clarke
- Liam Cooper-King
- Phil Lucas
- Dale Cumberbatch
- Stephen Atwell
- Gary Thompson
- Geoffrey Pilgrim ( 2 Try’s , 1 Assist)

== Record ==
Below is a table of the representative rugby matches played by a Barbados national XV at test level up until 13 June 2026, updated after match with Cayman Islands.

Opponent	Played	Won	Lost	Drawn	% Won
Bahamas	6	2	3	1	33.33%
Bermuda	5	0	5	0	0%
British Virgin Islands	3	3	0	0	100%
Canada	1	0	1	0	0%
Cayman Islands	2	1	1	0	50%
Curaçao	3	3	0	0	100%
Guatemala	1	0	1	0	0%
Guyana	18	6	10	2	33.33%
Jamaica	7	2	5	0	28.57%
Martinique	6	2	4	0	33.33%
Mexico	1	1	0	0	100%
Saint Lucia	4	4	0	0	100%
Saint Vincent and the Grenadines	4	4	0	0	100%
Trinidad and Tobago	19	2	16	1	10.53%
United States	1	0	1	0	0%
Total	81	30	47	4	37.04%

== See also ==
- Sport in Barbados
- Rugby union in Barbados
