= Cayman Islands national rugby union team =

Cayman Islands
- Nickname: FFP Cayman Rugby
- Union: Cayman Islands Rugby Football Union
- Head coach: Jamie Barnwell
First colours

World Rugby ranking
- Current: 49 (as of 20 May 2024)
- Lowest: 58 (11 December 2022)

First international
- Jamaica 9-10 Cayman Islands (13 March 1976)

Biggest win
- Cayman Islands 48-0 Jamaica (13 February 2001)

Biggest defeat
- Mexico 105-7 Cayman Islands (31 August 2019)

The Cayman Islands national rugby union team represents the Cayman Islands in the sport of rugby union. They have thus far not qualified for a Rugby World Cup, but have participated in qualifying tournaments. The sport in the Cayman Islands is governed by the Cayman Rugby Union. The Cayman Islands have players throughout the squad playing through the UK, Ireland, South Africa, Canada and the USA.

As of 2019, the Cayman Islands competes in the Rugby Americas Challenge along with Columbia, Mexico and Paraguay. In 2019 they were crowned champions of the Caribbean after representing the Northern Caribbean region and beating Guyana (who were the champions of the Southern region) by 58 to 14 on 9 February 2019. The Cayman Islands were the fourth team to qualify for the Americas Rugby Challenge which were held later in 2019.

Their shirts are dark blue, with a single 2 white hoops and red stripe across the shoulder.

== History ==
The Cayman Islands played Mexico in 1985 in Mexico City, defeating them 22 points to 18. There were also a number of games played in 1999 in Georgetown against other nations such as Bermuda and the Bahamas. The team played a match against Mexico in 2001, which they won 20 to 14.

The Cayman Islands attempted to qualify for the 2003 Rugby World Cup in Australia, taking part in the Americas qualifying tournaments during 2001. In their first match they defeated Guyana, but were then knocked out of qualification after losing to Trinidad and Tobago.

In 2005 they attempted to qualify for the 2007 Rugby World Cup in France, and started their campaign in the North Pool of Round 1a of the qualifying tournaments, alongside the Bahamas, Jamaica and Bermuda. They however finished second in the pool, behind the Bahamas, winning two of their three fixtures.

In 2018, the Cayman Islands signed a multi-year kit deal with apparel brand Scimitar Sportswear.

== Record ==
Below is a table of the representative rugby matches played by a Cayman Islands national XV at test level up until 31 November 2026, updated after match with Peru.

Opponent	Played	Won	Lost	Drawn	% Won
Bahamas	7	6	1	0	85.71%
Barbados	3	2	1	0	66.67%
Bermuda	15	11	4	0	73.33%
Canada U21	1	0	1	0	0%
Colombia	1	0	1	0	0%
Costa Rica	1	1	0	0	100%
Guadeloupe	1	1	0	0	100%
Guyana	4	4	0	0	100%
Jamaica	12	10	2	0	83.33%
Mexico	13	5	8	0	38.46%
Mexico A	1	1	0	0	100%
Paraguay	1	0	1	0	0%
Peru	1	1	0	0	100%
Trinidad and Tobago	3	0	3	0	0%
(United States) USA South	7	2	5	0	28.57%
Total	71	44	27	0	61.97%

== World Cup record ==
- 1987 - No qualifying tournament held
- 1991 - 1999 - Did not enter
- 2003 - 2023 - Did not qualify

== See also ==
- Rugby union in the Cayman Islands
- Cayman Islands national rugby union team (sevens)
- Cayman Islands women's national rugby union team
