= 2013 International Rugby Union matches =

2013 consisted of 340 Rugby union matches that included an international nation, with 295 of the matches being classed a test match. 126 international teams played at least one test either at home, away or at a neutral venue. On 154 occasions, the home side won, 118 away sides won, 5 draws and 63 neutral venue matches. 2013 marked two years to the 2015 Rugby World Cup, meaning for most tournaments; Africa Cup, Asian Five Nations, European Nations Cup, Oceania Cup and South American Rugby Championship acted as Rugby World Cup qualifiers. The Americas playoffs saw the first team to qualify for the World Cup, with Canada winning 40–20 on aggregate against the United States, to join Pool D as Americas 1. The fourteenth edition of the Six Nations Championship took place in February and March with Wales retaining the championship with a 30–3 record winning margin against England, while in August, September and October, the second edition of the Rugby Championship took place with New Zealand completing the sweep winning 6 from 6 to retain the championship.

June 2013, the busiest month of the year at 87 matches or 73 test matches, marked 125 years of the British & Irish Lions, as the Lions embarked on a 3-test tour against Australia, finishing with a historic 41–16 victory to seal a 2–1 test series win for the first time in 16 years. To end the year, November 2013 saw the number one test side the All Blacks win their fourteenth from fourteenth test match of the year, the first team to win every match in a calendar year in the professional era.

The IRB World Rankings changed very little from the end of 2012 to the end of 2013. New Zealand remained ranked number one a position they have held since 2010, South Africa stayed in second and Australia in third. England moved up to fourth from fifth where they were in 2012, while Samoa remained the highest tier 2 side despite falling one place to eighth in 2013. Japan slowly climbs the rankings ahead of their home Rugby World Cup in 2019 following a successful year. They earned their first win over Wales in Tokyo in June, before hosting the All Blacks for the first time in Japan. They scored the most tries than any other team at 75, 18 of which came in their 121–0 win over Philippines. Spain drew more matches than any other team this year, while Benin, Brunei and Burundi failed to score a single point in all their international matches.

The 340 matches below all contain an international team, some of which are not members of the International Rugby Board:

== January ==
Match results
Date	Match			Venue	Tournament/Trophy	Report
12 January 2013	United States Virgin Islands	6–7	British Virgin Islands	Lionel Roberts Park, Charlotte Amalie	Test match	Report
12 January 2013	Curaçao	37–24	Saint Vincent and the Grenadines	University of the Netherlands Antilles, Willemstad	NACRA Rugby Championship Rd 1a South	Report
19 January 2013	Turks and Caicos Islands	13–31	Jamaica	Meridian Field, Providenciales	NACRA Rugby Championship Rd 1a North	Report
19 January 2013	USA South	50–23	Mexico	Life University, Marietta	NACRA Rugby Championship Rd 1a North	Report
19 January 2013	Lions	51–13	Russia	Ellis Park Stadium, Johannesburg	Non-test match	Report
26 January 2013	Saint Lucia	35–41	British Virgin Islands	Corinth Playing Field, Corinth	NACRA Rugby Championship Rd 1a South	Report

== February ==
Match results
Date	Match			Venue	Tournament/Trophy		Report
2 February 2013	Russia	13–9	Spain	Sochi Central Stadium, Sochi	European Nation Cup Div. 1A; 2015 RWC European qualifier		Report
2 February 2013	Portugal	13–19	Romania	Estádio Universitário de Lisboa, Lisbon	European Nation Cup Div. 1A; 2015 RWC European qualifier		Report
2 February 2013	Belgium	13–17	Georgia	King Baudouin Stadium, Brussels	European Nation Cup Div. 1A; 2015 RWC European qualifier		Report
2 February 2013	Wales	22–30	Ireland	Millennium Stadium, Cardiff	Six Nations Championship		Report
2 February 2013	England	38–18	Scotland	Twickenham Stadium, London	Six Nations Championship	Calcutta Cup	Report
3 February 2013	Italy	23–18	France	Stadio Olimpico, Rome	Six Nations Championship	Giuseppe Garibaldi Trophy	Report
9 February 2013	Romania	29–14	Russia	Stadionul Arcul de Triumf, Bucharest	European Nation Cup Div. 1A; 2015 RWC European qualifier		Report
9 February 2013	Georgia	25–12	Portugal	Mikheil Meskhi Stadium, Tbilisi	European Nation Cup Div. 1A; 2015 RWC European qualifier		Report
9 February 2013	Belgium	21–21	Spain	King Baudouin Stadium, Brussels	European Nation Cup Div. 1A; 2015 RWC European qualifier		Report
9 February 2013	Scotland	34–10	Italy	Murrayfield Stadium, Edinburgh	Six Nations Championship		Report
9 February 2013	France	6–16	Wales	Stade de France, Saint-Denis	Six Nations Championship		Report
10 February 2013	Ireland	6–12	England	Aviva Stadium, Dublin	Six Nations Championship	Millennium Trophy	Report
15 February 2013	British Virgin Islands	12–39	Curaçao	Recreation Ground, Road Town	NACRA Rugby Championship Rd 1a South Final		Report
16 February 2013	British Virgin Islands	Reschd.	United States Virgin Islands	Recreation Ground, Road Town	Test match (Rescheduled 3 Aug)		
23 February 2013	Spain	15–24	Romania	Las Mestas Sports Complex, Gijón	European Nation Cup Div. 1A; 2015 RWC European qualifier		Report
23 February 2013	Russia	9–23	Georgia	Sochi Central Stadium, Sochi	European Nation Cup Div. 1A; 2015 RWC European qualifier		Report
23 February 2013	Portugal	18–12	Belgium	Estádio Universitário de Lisboa, Lisbon	European Nation Cup Div. 1A; 2015 RWC European qualifier		Report
23 February 2013	Italy	9–26	Wales	Stadio Olimpico, Rome	Six Nations Championship		Report
23 February 2013	England	23–13	France	Twickenham Stadium, London	Six Nations Championship		Report
23 February 2013	Jamaica	12–29	USA South	Utech Field, Kingston	NACRA Rugby Championship Rd 1a North Final		Report
24 February 2013	Scotland	12–8	Ireland	Murrayfield Stadium, London	Six Nations Championship	Centenary Quaich	Report

== March ==
Match results
Date	Match			Venue	Tournament/Trophy		Report
9 March 2013	Czech Republic	8–27	Germany	Rc Slavia Praha Stadion, Prague	European Nation Cup Div. 1B; 2015 RWC European qualifier		Report
9 March 2013	Portugal	23–31	Russia	Estádio Universitário de Lisboa, Lisbon	European Nation Cup Div. 1A; 2015 RWC European qualifier		Report
9 March 2013	Georgia	61–18	Spain	Mikheil Meskhi Stadium, Tbilisi	European Nation Cup Div. 1A; 2015 RWC European qualifier		Report
9 March 2013	Belgium	14–32	Romania	King Baudouin Stadium, Brussels	European Nation Cup Div. 1A; 2015 RWC European qualifier		Report
9 March 2013	Scotland	18–28	Wales	Murrayfield Stadium, Edinburgh	Six Nations Championship		Report
9 March 2013	Ireland	13–13	France	Aviva Stadium, Dublin	Six Nations Championship		Report
10 March 2013	England	18–11	Italy	Twickenham Stadium, London	Six Nations Championship		Report
16 March 2013	Cyprus	79–10	Bulgaria	Pafiako Stadium, Paphos	European Nation Cup Div. 2C		Report
16 March 2013	Moldova	37–12	Czech Republic	Dinamo Stadium, Chișinău	European Nation Cup Div. 1B; 2015 RWC European qualifier		Report
16 March 2013	Spain	9–9	Portugal	Estadio San Lázaro, Santiago de Compostela	European Nation Cup Div. 1A; 2015 RWC European qualifier		Report
16 March 2013	Russia	43–32	Belgium	Sochi Central Stadium, Sochi	European Nation Cup Div. 1A; 2015 RWC European qualifier		Report
16 March 2013	Romania	9–9	Georgia	Stadionul Arcul de Triumf, Bucharest	European Nation Cup Div. 1A; 2015 RWC European qualifier	Antim Cup	Report
16 March 2013	Italy	22–15	Ireland	Stadio Olimpico, Rome	Six Nations Championship		Report
16 March 2013	Wales	30–3	England	Millennium Stadium, Cardiff	Six Nations Championship		Report
16 March 2013	France	23–16	Scotland	Stade de France, Saint-Denis	Six Nations Championship		Report
23 March 2013	Gibraltar	36–10	Cyprus Select	Victoria Stadium, Gibraltar	Non-test match		Report
30 March 2013	Greece	11–13	Finland	Dasos Haidariou Municipal Stadium, Athens	European Nation Cup Div. 2D; 2015 RWC European qualifier		Report
30 March 2013	Andorra	11–22	Latvia	Camp d'Esports del M.I. Consell General, Andorra la Vella	European Nation Cup Div. 2B; 2015 RWC European qualifier		Report
30 March 2013	Poland	13–12	Ukraine	National Rugby Stadium, Gdynia	European Nation Cup Div. 1B; 2015 RWC European qualifier		Report
31 March 2013	Kazakhstan	10–33	Thailand	Havelock Park, Colombo, Sri Lanka (NV)	Asian Five Nations Div. 1; 2015 RWC Asian qualifier		Report
31 March 2013	Sri Lanka	39–8	Chinese Taipei	Havelock Park, Colombo	Asian Five Nations Div. 1; 2015 RWC Asian qualifier		Report
31 March 2013	Cyprus B	19–34	United Arab Emirates	Rugby ground, Limassol	Non-test match		

== April ==
Match results
Date	Match			Venue	Tournament/Trophy	Report
3 April 2013	Kazakhstan	42–10	Chinese Taipei	Havelock Park, Colombo, Sri Lanka (NV)	Asian Five Nations Div. 1; 2015 RWC Asian qualifier	Report
3 April 2013	Sri Lanka	45–7	Thailand	Havelock Park, Colombo	Asian Five Nations Div. 1; 2015 RWC Asian qualifier	Report
6 April 2013	Chinese Taipei	52–23	Thailand	Havelock Park, Colombo, Sri Lanka (NV)	Asian Five Nations Div. 1; 2015 RWC Asian qualifier	Report
6 April 2013	Sri Lanka	49–18	Kazakhstan	Havelock Park, Colombo	Asian Five Nations Div. 1; 2015 RWC Asian qualifier	Report
6 April 2013	Bulgaria	20–14	Slovenia	Stadium N.S.A., Sofia	European Nation Cup Div. 2C; 2015 RWC European qualifier	Report
6 April 2013	Austria	10–11	Hungary	Sportanlage Dirnelwiese, Vienna	European Nation Cup Div. 2C; 2015 RWC European qualifier	Report
6 April 2013	Israel	17–15	Latvia	Wingate Institute, Netanya	European Nation Cup Div. 2B; 2015 RWC European qualifier	Report
6 April 2013	Malta	10–19	Switzerland	Hibernians Ground, Paola	European Nation Cup Div. 2A; 2015 RWC European qualifier	Report
6 April 2013	Germany	73–17	Sweden	Wolfgang Meyer Sports Complex, Hamburg	European Nation Cup Div. 1B; 2015 RWC European qualifier	Report
6 April 2013	Uruguay	10–41	Argentina XV	Estadio Charrúa, Montevideo	Non-test match	Report
7 April 2013	Ukraine	18–38	Moldova	Spartak Stadium, Odesa	European Nation Cup Div. 1B; 2015 RWC European qualifier	Report
7 April 2013	Barbados	41–3	Curaçao	Garrison Savannah, Bridgetown	NACRA Rugby Championship Rd 1b South	Report
13 April 2013	Greece	21–14	Norway	Dasos Haidariou Municipal Stadium, Athens	European Nation Cup Div. 2D; 2015 RWC European qualifier	Report
13 April 2013	Bosnia and Herzegovina	33–23	Luxembourg	Stadion Luke, Tešanj	European Nation Cup Div. 2D; 2015 RWC European qualifier	Report
13 April 2013	Denmark	38–0	Serbia	Odense Atletikstadion, Odense	European Nation Cup Div. 2B; 2015 RWC European qualifier	Report
13 April 2013	Switzerland	37–21	Lithuania	Centre sportif de Colovray Nyon, Nyon	European Nation Cup Div. 2A; 2015 RWC European qualifier	Report
13 April 2013	Netherlands	48–10	Malta	Netherlands National Stadium, Amsterdam	European Nation Cup Div. 2A; 2015 RWC European qualifier	Report
13 April 2013	Moldova	24–20	Poland	Dinamo Stadium, Chișinău	European Nation Cup Div. 1B; 2015 RWC European qualifier	Report
13 April 2013	Bahamas	15–42	USA South	Charlie's Place Nassau Stadium, Nassau	NACRA Rugby Championship Rd 1b North	Report
16 April 2013	Brazil	50–14	Mexico	Estádio Martins Pereira, São José dos Campos	Brazil v Mexico test series	Report
20 April 2013	Hong Kong	53–7	United Arab Emirates	Hong Kong Football Club Stadium, Hong Kong	Asian Five Nations; 2015 RWC Asian qualifier	Report
20 April 2013	Japan	121–0	Philippines	Level-5 Stadium, Fukuoka	Asian Five Nations; 2015 RWC Asian qualifier	Report
20 April 2013	Luxembourg	20–7	Greece	Stade Boy Konen, Luxembourg	European Nation Cup Div. 2D; 2015 RWC European qualifier	Report
20 April 2013	Bosnia and Herzegovina	19–5	Finland	Bilino Polje, Zenica	European Nation Cup Div. 2D; 2015 RWC European qualifier	Report
20 April 2013	Slovenia	22–20	Austria	Oval Stadium, Ljubljana	European Nation Cup Div. 2C; 2015 RWC European qualifier (Note: As Cyprus is not a IRB member, the Hungary v Cyprus match was not part of the RWC qualifications as listed. However, the Slovenia v Austria match is listed correctly as a RWC Qualification match.)	Report
20 April 2013	Hungary	15–16	Cyprus	Ferences sporttelep, Esztergom	European Nation Cup Div. 2C; 2015 RWC European qualifier	Report
20 April 2013	Israel	46–3	Denmark	Wingate Institute, Netanya	European Nation Cup Div. 2B; 2015 RWC European qualifier	Report
20 April 2013	Croatia	24–29	Netherlands	Stadion NK Rudeš, Zagreb	European Nation Cup Div. 2A; 2015 RWC European qualifier	Report
20 April 2013	Brazil	76–5	Mexico	Estádio Bruno José Daniel, Santo André	Brazil v Mexico test series	Report
26 April 2013	United Arab Emirates	10–75	South Korea	Al Ain RFC, Al Ain	Asian Five Nations; 2015 RWC Asian qualifier	Report
27 April 2013	Hong Kong	0–38	Japan	Hong Kong Football Club Stadium, Hong Kong	Asian Five Nations; 2015 RWC Asian qualifier	Report
27 April 2013	Lithuania	15–14	Croatia	Academy rugby, Vilnius	European Nation Cup Div. 2A; 2015 RWC European qualifier	Report
27 April 2013	Ghana	22–5	Burkina Faso	Baba Yara Stadium, Kumasi	Test match	
27 April 2013	Chile	38–22	Brazil	Estadio Municipal Germán Becker, Temuco	South American Rugby Championship A 2015 RWC Americas qualifier (Note: As Argentina has already qualified for RWC 2015, the match between Uruguay and Argentina was not listed as a RWC qualifier, though the Chilie v Brazil is listed correctly.)	Report
27 April 2013	Uruguay	18–29	Argentina	Estadio Charrúa, Montevideo	South American Rugby Championship A 2015 RWC Americas qualifier	Report

== May ==
Match results
Date	Match			Venue	Tournament/Trophy		Report
1 May 2013	Argentina	85–10	Chile	Estadio Charrúa, Montevideo, Uruguay (NV)	South American Rugby Championship A 2015 RWC Americas qualifier (Note: As Argentina has already qualified for RWC 2015, the match between Argentina and Chile was not listed as a RWC qualifier, though the Uruguay v Brazil is listed correctly.)		Report
1 May 2013	Uruguay	58–7	Brazil	Estadio Charrúa, Montevideo	South American Rugby Championship A 2015 RWC Americas qualifier		Report
4 May 2013	Japan	64–5	South Korea	Chichibunomiya Rugby Stadium, Tokyo	Asian Five Nations; 2015 RWC Asian qualifier		Report
4 May 2013	Philippines	20–59	Hong Kong	Rizal Memorial Stadium, Manila	Asian Five Nations; 2015 RWC Asian qualifier		Report
4 May 2013	Argentina	83–0	Brazil	Estadio Charrúa, Montevideo, Uruguay (NV)	South American Rugby Championship A 2015 RWC Americas qualifier (Note: As Argentina has already qualified for RWC 2015, the match between Argentina and Brazil was not listed as a RWC qualifier, though the Uruguay v Chile is listed correctly.)		Report
4 May 2013	Uruguay	23–9	Chile	Estadio Charrúa, Montevideo	South American Rugby Championship A 2015 RWC Americas qualifier		Report
4 May 2013	USA South	9–7	Cayman Islands	Life University, Atlanta	NACRA Rugby Championship Rd 2 North		Report
5 May 2013	Luxembourg	22–10	Slovenia	Stade Josy Barthel, Luxembourg	2015 RWC European qualifier		Report
8 May 2013	Lebanon	35–25	Uzbekistan	The Sevens, Dubai, UAE (NV)	Asian Five Nations Div. 4		Report
8 May 2013	Laos	25–31	Pakistan	The Sevens, Dubai, UAE (NV)	Asian Five Nations Div. 4		Report
10 May 2013	Laos	15–18	Uzbekistan	The Sevens, Dubai, UAE (NV)	Asian Five Nations Div. 4		Report
10 May 2013	Lebanon	45–12	Pakistan	The Sevens, Dubai, UAE (NV)	Asian Five Nations Div. 4		Report
10 May 2013	United Arab Emirates	3–93	Japan	The Sevens, Dubai	Asian Five Nations; 2015 RWC Asian qualifier		Report
11 May 2013	South Korea	62–19	Philippines	Ansan Wa~ Stadium, Ansan	Asian Five Nations; 2015 RWC Asian qualifier		Report
18 May 2013	Philippines	24–8	United Arab Emirates	Rizal Memorial Stadium, Manila	Asian Five Nations; 2015 RWC Asian qualifier		Report
18 May 2013	South Korea	43–22	Hong Kong	Ansan Wa~ Stadium, Ansan	Asian Five Nations; 2015 RWC Asian qualifier		Report
18 May 2013	Bermuda	14–24	USA South	Bermuda National Stadium, Devonshire Parish	NACRA Rugby Championship Rd 2 North		Report
18 May 2013	Guyana	19–17	Barbados	Providence Stadium, Providence	NACRA Rugby Championship Rd 2 South		Report
25 May 2013	Japan	17–27	Tonga	Nippatsu Mitsuzawa Stadium, Kanagawa	IRB Pacific Nations Cup		Report
25 May 2013	Canada	16–9	United States	Ellerslie Rugby Park, Edmonton	IRB Pacific Nations Cup		Report
25 May 2013	Barbados	6–19	Trinidad and Tobago	Garrison Savannah, Bridgetown	NACRA Rugby Championship Rd 2 South		Report
25 May 2013	Namibia	23–26	South Africa President's XV	Hage Geingob Rugby Stadium, Windhoek	Non-test match		Report
26 May 2013	England	40–12	Barbarians	Twickenham Stadium, London	Non-test match	Killik Cup	Report

== June ==
Match results
Date	Match			Venue	Tournament/Trophy		Report
1 June 2013	Fiji	22–8	Japan	Churchill Park, Lautoka	IRB Pacific Nations Cup		Report
1 June 2013	British & Irish Lions	59–8	Barbarians	Hong Kong Stadium, Hong Kong (NV)	British & Irish Lions tour (non-test)		Report
1 June 2013	Sweden	19–11	Poland	Korsängens Rugby arena, Enköping	European Nation Cup Div. 1B; 2015 RWC European qualifier		Report
1 June 2013	Trinidad and Tobago	20–0	Guyana	UWI SPEC, Saint Augustine	NACRA Rugby Championship Rd 2 South		Report
1 June 2013	Cayman Islands	20–14	Bermuda	Truman Bodden Sports Complex, George Town	NACRA Rugby Championship Rd 2 North		Report
1 June 2013	Lions	74–14	Samoa	Ellis Park Stadium, Johannesburg	Non-test match		Report
1 June 2013	San Francisco Golden Gate RFC	10–55	Tonga	Ray Sheeran Field, San Francisco, California	Non-test match		Report
2 June 2013	South American XV	21–41	England	Estadio Charrúa, Montevideo	Tour match		Report
3 June 2013	Burkina Faso	13–23	Mali	Seyni Kountché Stadium, Niamey, Niger (NV)	Africa Cup Div. 2 North		Report
3 June 2013	Ghana	13–11	Togo	Seyni Kountché Stadium, Niamey, Niger (NV)	Africa Cup Div. 2 North		Report
3 June 2013	Niger	48–0	Benin	Seyni Kountché Stadium, Niamey	Africa Cup Div. 2 North		Report
4 June 2013	Singapore	67–8	India	MBPJ Stadium, Kuala Lumpur, Malaysia (NV)	Asian Five Nations Div. 2		Report
4 June 2013	Malaysia	48–10	Iran	MBPJ Stadium, Kuala Lumpur	Asian Five Nations Div. 2		Report
5 June 2013	Guam	33–15	Indonesia	MBPJ Stadium, Kuala Lumpur, Malaysia (NV)	Asian Five Nations Div. 3		Report
5 June 2013	China	0–76	Qatar	MBPJ Stadium, Kuala Lumpur, Malaysia (NV)	Asian Five Nations Div. 3		Report
5 June 2013	Western Force	17–69	British & Irish Lions	Patersons Stadium, Perth	British & Irish Lions tour (non-test)		Report
5 June 2013	Canada	20–18	Fiji	Twin Elm Rugby Park, Ottawa	IRB Pacific Nations Cup		Report
6 June 2013	Benin	0–41	Burkina Faso	Seyni Kountché Stadium, Niamey, Niger (NV)	Africa Cup Div. 2 North		Report
6 June 2013	Mali	19–8	Togo	Seyni Kountché Stadium, Niamey, Niger (NV)	Africa Cup Div. 2 North		Report
6 June 2013	Niger	29–3	Ghana	Seyni Kountché Stadium, Niamey	Africa Cup Div. 2 North		Report
7 June 2013	India	13–30	Iran	MBPJ Stadium, Kuala Lumpur, Malaysia (NV)	Asian Five Nations Div. 2		Report
7 June 2013	China	13–37	Indonesia	MBPJ Stadium, Kuala Lumpur, Malaysia (NV)	Asian Five Nations Div. 3		Report
7 June 2013	Uruguay	9–37	South Africa President's XV	Avchala Stadium, Tbilisi, Georgia (NV)	IRB Tbilisi Cup		Report
7 June 2013	Georgia	15–20	Emerging Ireland	Avchala Stadium, Tbilisi	IRB Tbilisi Cup		Report
8 June 2013	Malaysia	17–20	Singapore	MBPJ Stadium, Kuala Lumpur	Asian Five Nations Div. 2		Report
8 June 2013	Guam	7–13	Qatar	MBPJ Stadium, Kuala Lumpur, Malaysia (NV)	Asian Five Nations Div. 3		Report
8 June 2013	Queensland Reds	12–22	British & Irish Lions	Suncorp Stadium, Brisbane	British & Irish Lions tour (non-test)		Report
8 June 2013	New Zealand	23–13	France	Eden Park, Auckland	New Zealand v France test series	Dave Gallaher Trophy test 1	Report
8 June 2013	Argentina	3–32	England	Estadio Padre Ernesto Martearena, Salta	Argentina v England test series		Report
8 June 2013	Japan	18–22	Wales	Kintetsu Hanazono Rugby Stadium, Osaka	Japan v Wales test series		Report
8 June 2013	Samoa	27–17	Scotland	Kings Park Stadium, Durban, South Africa (NV)	South African Quadrangular tournament		Report
8 June 2013	South Africa	44–10	Italy	Kings Park Stadium, Durban	South African Quadrangular tournament		Report
8 June 2013	United States	12–15	Ireland	BBVA Compass Stadium, Houston	Mid-year test		Report
8 June 2013	Romania	30–20	Russia	Stadionul Arcul de Triumf, Bucharest	IRB Nations Cup		Report
8 June 2013	Argentina XV	6–26	Italy A	Stadionul Arcul de Triumf, Bucharest, Romania (NV)	IRB Nations Cup		Report
8 June 2013	Canada	36–27	Tonga	Richardson Memorial Stadium, Kingston	IRB Pacific Nations Cup		Report
10 June 2013	Benin	0–63	Togo	Seyni Kountché Stadium, Niamey, Niger (NV)	Africa Cup Div. 2 North		Report
10 June 2013	Burkina Faso	28–6	Ghana	Seyni Kountché Stadium, Niamey, Niger (NV)	Africa Cup Div. 2 North		Report
10 June 2013	Niger	17–14	Mali	Seyni Kountché Stadium, Niamey	Africa Cup Div. 2 North		Report
11 June 2013	Combined NSW-QLD Country	0–64	British & Irish Lions	Hunter Stadium, Newcastle	British & Irish Lions tour (non-test)		Report
11 June 2013	Blues	15–38	France	North Harbour Stadium, Auckland	Tour match		Report
11 June 2013	Senegal	12–35	Namibia	Iba Mar Diop, Dakar	Africa Cup Div. 1B; 2015 RWC African qualifier		Report
11 June 2013	Botswana	12–43	Tunisia	Iba Mar Diop, Dakar, Senegal (NV)	Africa Cup Div. 1B; 2015 RWC African qualifier		Report
11 June 2013	Emerging Ireland	8–19	South Africa President's XV	Avchala Stadium, Tbilisi, Georgia (NV)	IRB Tbilisi Cup		Report
11 June 2013	Georgia	27–3	Uruguay	Avchala Stadium, Tbilisi	IRB Tbilisi Cup		Report
12 June 2013	Fiji	33–14	(New Zealand) Classic All Blacks	ANZ Stadium, Suva	Test match		Report
12 June 2013	Romania	30–8	Argentina XV	Stadionul Arcul de Triumf, Bucharest	IRB Nations Cup		Report
12 June 2013	Russia	19–27	Italy A	Stadionul Arcul de Triumf, Bucharest, Romania (NV)	IRB Nations Cup		Report
14 June 2013	United States	9–18	Tonga	StubHub Center, California	IRB Pacific Nations Cup		Report
15 June 2013	New South Wales Waratahs	17–47	British & Irish Lions	Sydney Football Stadium, Sydney	British & Irish Lions tour (non-test)		Report
15 June 2013	New Zealand	30–0	France	AMI Stadium, Christchurch	New Zealand v France test series	Dave Gallaher Trophy test 2	Report
15 June 2013	Argentina	26–51	England	Estadio José Amalfitani, Buenos Aires	Argentina v England test series		Report
15 June 2013	Japan	23–8	Wales	Chichibunomiya Rugby Stadium, Tokyo	Japan v Wales test series		Report
15 June 2013	Italy	10–39	Samoa	Mbombela Stadium, Nelspruit, South Africa (NV)	South African Quadrangular tournament		Report
15 June 2013	South Africa	30–17	Scotland	Mbombela Stadium, Nelspruit	South African Quadrangular tournament		Report
15 June 2013	Canada	14–40	Ireland	BMO Field, Toronto	Mid-year test		Report
15 June 2013	Senegal	41–5	Botswana	Iba Mar Diop, Dakar	Africa Cup Div. 1B; 2015 RWC African qualifier		Report
15 June 2013	Namibia	45–13	Tunisia	Iba Mar Diop, Dakar, Senegal (NV)	Africa Cup Div. 1B; 2015 RWC African qualifier		Report
15 June 2013	Kenya	16–17	Uganda	Kasarani Stadium, Nairobi	Elgon Cup test 1		Report
16 June 2013	Argentina XV	30–17	Russia	Stadionul Arcul de Triumf, Bucharest, Romania (NV)	IRB Nations Cup		Report
16 June 2013	Romania	26–13	Italy A	Stadionul Arcul de Triumf, Bucharest	IRB Nations Cup		Report
16 June 2013	Uruguay	33–42	Emerging Ireland	Avchala Stadium, Tbilisi, Georgia (NV)	IRB Tbilisi Cup		Report
16 June 2013	Georgia	16–21	South Africa President's XV	Avchala Stadium, Tbilisi	IRB Tbilisi Cup		Report
18 June 2013	Brumbies	14–12	British & Irish Lions	Canberra Stadium, Canberra	British & Irish Lions tour (non-test)		Report
19 June 2013	Fiji	35–10	United States	Mizuho Rugby Stadium, Nagoya, Japan (NV)	IRB Pacific Nations Cup		Report
19 June 2013	Japan	16–13	Canada	Mizuho Rugby Stadium, Nagoya	IRB Pacific Nations Cup		Report
22 June 2013	New Zealand	24–9	France	Yarrow Stadium, New Plymouth	New Zealand v France test series	Dave Gallaher Trophy test 3	Report
22 June 2013	Australia	21–23	British & Irish Lions	Suncorp Stadium, Brisbane	Australia v British & Irish Lions test series	Tom Richards Cup test 1	Report
22 June 2013	Italy	29–30	Scotland	Loftus Versfeld Stadium, Pretoria, South Africa (NV)	South African Quadrangular tournament		Report
22 June 2013	South Africa	56–23	Samoa	Loftus Versfeld Stadium, Pretoria	South African Quadrangular tournament		Report
22 June 2013	Uganda	13–19	Kenya	Kyadondo Rugby Club, Kampala	Elgon Cup test 1		Report
22 June 2013	Rwanda	20–0	Burundi	Stade Amahoro, Kigali City	Africa Cup Div. 2 South		Report
22 June 2013	Argentina	29–18	Georgia	Estadio Bicentenario, San Juan	Mid-year test		Report
22 June 2013	Trinidad and Tobago	18–26	USA South	Fatima College, Port of Spain	NACRA Rugby Championship Rd. 3		Report
23 June 2013	Fiji	34–21	Tonga	Chichibunomiya Rugby Stadium, Tokyo, Japan (NV)	IRB Pacific Nations Cup		Report
23 June 2013	Japan	38–20	United States	Chichibunomiya Rugby Stadium, Tokyo	IRB Pacific Nations Cup		Report
23 June 2013	Morocco	77–3	Niger	ESTP INPHB Sud, Yamoussoukro, Ivory Coast (NV)	Africa Cup Div. 1C		Report
23 June 2013	Ivory Coast	77–3	Zambia	ESTP INPHB Sud, Yamoussoukro	Africa Cup Div. 1C		Report
23 June 2013	Mauritius	3–63	Nigeria	ESTP INPHB Sud, Yamoussoukro, Ivory Coast (NV)	Africa Cup Div. 1C		Report
25 June 2013	Melbourne Rebels	0–35	British & Irish Lions	AAMI Park, Melbourne	British & Irish Lions tour (non-test)		Report
26 June 2013	Ivory Coast	83–3	Mauritius	ESTP INPHB Sud, Yamoussoukro	Africa Cup Div. 1C		Report
26 June 2013	Morocco	38–8	Nigeria	ESTP INPHB Sud, Yamoussoukro, Ivory Coast (NV)	Africa Cup Div. 1C		Report
26 June 2013	Zambia	30–21	Niger	ESTP INPHB Sud, Yamoussoukro, Ivory Coast (NV)	Africa Cup Div. 1C		Report
29 June 2013	Australia	16–15	British & Irish Lions	Etihad Stadium, Melbourne	Australia v British & Irish Lions test series	Tom Richards Cup test 2	Report
29 June 2013	Zambia	14–45	Nigeria	ESTP INPHB Sud, Yamoussoukro, Ivory Coast (NV)	Africa Cup Div. 1C		Report
29 June 2013	Mauritius	13–17	Niger	ESTP INPHB Sud, Yamoussoukro, Ivory Coast (NV)	Africa Cup Div. 1C		Report
29 June 2013	Morocco	15–18	Ivory Coast	ESTP INPHB Sud, Yamoussoukro	Africa Cup Div. 1C		Report

== July ==
Match results
Date	Match			Venue	Tournament/Trophy		Report
5 July 2013	Cambodia	38–0	Brunei	RCAF Old Stadium, Phnom Penh	Asian Five Nations Div. 5		Report
6 July 2013	Cook Islands	38–5	Tahiti	Lloyd Robson Oval, Port Moresby, Papua New Guinea (NV)	FORU Oceania Cup		Report
6 July 2013	Papua New Guinea	29–22	Solomon Islands	Lloyd Robson Oval, Port Moresby	FORU Oceania Cup		Report
6 July 2013	Australia	16–41	British & Irish Lions	ANZ Stadium, Sydney	Australia v British & Irish Lions test series	Tom Richards Cup test 3	Report
7 July 2013	Cambodia	28–0	Brunei	RCAF Old Stadium, Phnom Penh	Asian Five Nations Div. 5		Report
9 July 2013	Cook Islands	39–12	Solomon Islands	Lloyd Robson Oval, Port Moresby, Papua New Guinea (NV)	FORU Oceania Cup		Report
9 July 2013	Papua New Guinea	39–32	Tahiti	Lloyd Robson Oval, Port Moresby	FORU Oceania Cup		Report
10 July 2013	Kenya	51–11	Uganda	Stade Mahamasina, Antananarivo, Madagascar (NV)	Africa Cup Div. 1A; 2015 RWC African qualifier		Report
10 July 2013	Madagascar	18–38	Zimbabwe	Stade Mahamasina, Antananarivo	Africa Cup Div. 1A; 2015 RWC African qualifier		Report
13 July 2013	Solomon Islands	23–22	Tahiti	Lloyd Robson Oval, Port Moresby, Papua New Guinea (NV)	FORU Oceania Cup		Report
13 July 2013	Papua New Guinea	31–37	Cook Islands	Lloyd Robson Oval, Port Moresby	FORU Oceania Cup		Report
13 July 2013	Burundi	0–22	Rwanda	Prince Louis Rwagasore Stadium, Bujumbura	Africa Cup Div. 2 South		Report
14 July 2013	Kenya	29–17	Zimbabwe	Stade Mahamasina, Antananarivo, Madagascar (NV)	Africa Cup Div. 1A; 2015 RWC African qualifier		Report
14 July 2013	Uganda	32–48	Madagascar	Mahamasina Municipal Stadium, Antananarivo	Africa Cup Div. 1A; 2015 RWC African qualifier		Report

== August ==
Match results
Date	Match			Venue	Tournament/Trophy		Report
3 August 2013	British Virgin Islands	36–0	United States Virgin Islands	A.O. Shirley Recreation Ground, Road Town	Test match		
3 August 2013	Argentina	29–27	NSW Barbarians	La Plata Rugby Club, La Plata	2013 Rugby Championship Warm-ups		Report
9 August 2013	Argentina	58–12	NSW Barbarians	Estadio Padre Martearena, Salta	2013 Rugby Championship Warm-ups		Report
17 August 2013	Australia	29–47	New Zealand	ANZ Stadium, Sydney	The Rugby Championship	Bledisloe Cup test 1	Report
17 August 2013	South Africa	73–13	Argentina	FNB Stadium, Johannesburg	The Rugby Championship		Report
17 August 2013	United States	9–27	Canada	Blackbaud Stadium, Charleston, South Carolina	2015 RWC Americas qualifier		Report
18 August 2013	Singapore	25–35	Hong Kong A	Yio Chu Kang Stadium, Ang Mo Kio	Asian Tri-Nations		Report
21 August 2013	Hong Kong A	67–5	Chinese Taipei	Yio Chu Kang Stadium, Ang Mo Kio, Singapore (NV)	Asian Tri-Nations		Report
24 August 2013	Singapore	30–19	Chinese Taipei	Yio Chu Kang Stadium, Ang Mo Kio	Asian Tri-Nations		Report
24 August 2013	New Zealand	27–16	Australia	Westpac Stadium, Wellington	The Rugby Championship	Bledisloe Cup test 2	Report
24 August 2013	Argentina	17–22	South Africa	Estadio Malvinas Argentinas, Mendoza	The Rugby Championship		Report
24 August 2013	Canada	13–11	United States	BMO Field, Toronto	2015 RWC Americas qualifier		Report
25 August 2013	Venezuela	14–32	Colombia	Rakiura Resort day, Luque, Paraguay (NV)	South American Rugby Championship B		Report
25 August 2013	Paraguay	22–0	Peru	Rakiura Resort day, Luque	South American Rugby Championship B		Report
27 August 2013	Colombia	27–28	Peru	Rakiura Resort day, Luque, Paraguay (NV)	South American Rugby Championship B		Report
27 August 2013	Paraguay	48–7	Venezuela	Rakiura Resort day, Luque	South American Rugby Championship B		Report
30 August 2013	Venezuela	29–25	Peru	Rakiura Resort day, Luque, Paraguay (NV)	South American Rugby Championship B		Report
30 August 2013	Paraguay	25–15	Colombia	Rakiura Resort day, Luque	South American Rugby Championship B		Report

== September ==
Match results
Date	Match			Venue	Tournament/Trophy		Report
7 September 2013	New Zealand	28–13	Argentina	Waikato Stadium, Hamilton	The Rugby Championship		Report
7 September 2013	Australia	12–38	South Africa	Suncorp Stadium, Brisbane	The Rugby Championship	M. Challenge Plate test 1	Report
7 September 2013	Poland	30–9	Sweden	Stadion Polonii Warszawa, Warsaw	European Nation Cup Div. 1B; 2015 RWC European qualifier		Report
14 September 2013	New Zealand	29–15	South Africa	Eden Park, Auckland	The Rugby Championship	Freedom Cup test 1	Report
14 September 2013	Australia	14–13	Argentina	Patersons Stadium, Perth	The Rugby Championship	Puma Trophy test 1	Report
21 September 2013	Catalonia	64–10	Andorra	Camp de la Foixarda, Barcelona	Test match		Report
28 September 2013	Finland A	17–24	Estonia	Paavo Nurmi Stadium, Turku	Non-test match (Prequel to FIN v GRE)		
28 September 2013	Finland	35–20	Greece	Paavo Nurmi Stadium, Turku	European Nation Cup Div. 2D		Report
28 September 2013	Germany	60–17	Czech Republic	Fritz-Grunebaum-Sportpark, Heidelberg	Test match		
28 September 2013	South Africa	28–8	Australia	Newland, Cape Town	The Rugby Championship	M. Challenge Plate test 2	Report
28 September 2013	Argentina	15–33	New Zealand	Estadio Ciudad de La Plata, La Plata	The Rugby Championship		Report

== October ==
Match results
Date	Match			Venue	Tournament/Trophy		Report
5 October 2013	Luxembourg	12–26	Israel	Stade Josy Barthel, Luxembourg	2015 RWC European qualifier		Report
5 October 2013	Bulgaria	5–67	Hungary	Sofia	European Nation Cup Div. 2C		Report
5 October 2013	Germany	20–3	NZL Ambassador's XV	Sportanlage an der Feldgerichtstrasse, Frankfurt	Non-test match		
5 October 2013	South Africa	27–38	New Zealand	Coco-Cola Park, Johannesburg	The Rugby Championship	Freedom Cup test 2	Report
5 October 2013	Argentina	17–54	Australia	Estadio Gigante de Arroyito, Rosario	The Rugby Championship	Puma Trophy test 2	Report
5 October 2013	USA Select	9–27	Argentina XV	Canadian Rugby Centre of Ex., Langford Canada (NV)	Americas Rugby Championship		Report
11 October 2013	Canada A	17–10	Uruguay	Canadian Rugby Centre of Ex., Langford	Americas Rugby Championship		Report
12 October 2013	Poland	30–10	Czech Republic	Stadion Polonii Warszawa, Warsaw	European Nation Cup Div. 1B; 2015 RWC European qualifier		Report
12 October 2013	Latvia	25–14	Serbia	Jāņa Daliņa stadionā, Valmiera	European Nation Cup Div. 2B		Report
12 October 2013	Bosnia and Herzegovina	17–20	Greece	Stadion pod Borićima, Bihać	European Nation Cup Div. 2D		Report
12 October 2013	Finland	12–24	Norway	Paavo Nurmi Stadium, Turku	European Nation Cup Div. 2D		Report
15 October 2013	Uruguay	0–34	Argentina XV	Canadian Rugby Centre of Ex., Langford Canada (NV)	Americas Rugby Championship		Report
15 October 2013	Canada A	10–30	USA Select	Canadian Rugby Centre of Ex., Langford	Americas Rugby Championship		Report
19 October 2013	New Zealand	41–33	Australia	Forsyth Barr Stadium, Dunedin	Bledisloe Cup test 3		Report
19 October 2013	Sweden	11–17	Czech Republic	Korsängens Rugby Arena, Enköping	European Nation Cup Div. 1B; 2015 RWC European qualifier		Report
19 October 2013	Serbia	6–18	Israel	Nastavni centar MUP Srbije – Makiš, Belgrade	European Nation Cup Div. 2B		Report
19 October 2013	Austria	58–14	Bulgaria	Hohe Warte Stadium, Vienna	European Nation Cup Div. 2C		Report
19 October 2013	Norway	7–9	Luxembourg	Bislett Stadion, Oslo	European Nation Cup Div. 2D		Report
19 October 2013	Uruguay	8–20	USA Select	Canadian Rugby Centre of Ex., Langford Canada (NV)	Americas Rugby Championship		Report
19 October 2013	Canada A	14–23	Argentina XV	Canadian Rugby Centre of Ex., Langford	Americas Rugby Championship		Report
19 October 2013	Nicaragua	10–39	El Salvador	Granada Cocibolca Jockey Club	Test match		
26 October 2013	Sri Lanka	12–17	Madagascar	Colombo Racecourse, Colombo	Serendib International Cup		Report
26 October 2013	Israel	8–52	Netherlands	Wingate Institute, Netanya	2015 RWC European qualifier		Report
26 October 2013	Ukraine	16–28	Germany	Kharkiv	European Nation Cup Div. 1B; 2015 RWC European qualifier		Report
26 October 2013	Latvia	19–22	Andorra	Zemgales Olimpiskajā sporta centrā, Jelgava	European Nation Cup Div. 2B		Report
26 October 2013	Hungary	35–3	Slovenia	Ferences sporttelep, Esztergom	European Nation Cup Div. 2C		Report
26 October 2013	Saint Vincent and the Grenadines	25–10	HMS Lancaster	Sion Hill Playing Field	Non-test match		
26 October 2013	Unión de Rugby de Rosario	36–7	Uruguay	Jockey Club de Rosario, Rosario	Non-test match		Report
27 October 2013	Chile	36–7	San Juan de Argentina	The CARR	Non-test match		
29 October 2013	Madagascar	25–21	Poland	Colombo Racecourse, Colombo, Sri Lanka (NV)	Serendib International Cup		Report

== November ==
Match results
Date	Match			Venue	Tournament/Trophy		Report
1 November 2013	Sri Lanka	26–25	Poland	Colombo Racecourse, Colombo	Serendib International Cup		Report
2 November 2013	Ukraine	35–11	Sweden	Stadion NPDSU, Irpin	European Nation Cup Div. 1B; 2015 RWC European qualifier		Report
2 November 2013	Croatia	11–26	Switzerland	RK Nada Split Stari Plac, Split	European Nation Cup Div. 2A		Report
2 November 2013	Lithuania	10–13	Malta	Regbio Stadione Vingio Parke, Vilnius	European Nation Cup Div. 2A		Report
2 November 2013	Denmark	13–15	Israel	Odense Atletikstadion, Odense	European Nation Cup Div. 2B		Report
2 November 2013	England	20–13	Australia	Twickenham Stadium, London	End-of-year test	Cook Cup	Report
2 November 2013	Japan	6–54	New Zealand	Chichibunomiya Rugby Stadium, Tokyo	End-of-year test		Report
2 November 2013	Belgium	26–10	Tunisia	Stade Leburton, Tubize	End-of-year test		Report
2 November 2013	Uzbekistan	28–21	Moscow Dragons	National University Stadium, Tashkent	Non-test match		Report
3 November 2013	Canada	15–40	Māori All Blacks	BMO Field, Toronto	Māori All Blacks tour		Report
8 November 2013	Senegal	33–10	Ivory Coast	Stade Pierre-Antoine, Castres, France (NV)	End-of-year test		Report
8 November 2013	Namibia	35–26	Zimbabwe	Hage Geingob Rugby Stadium, Windhoek	Namibian Tri-Nations		Report
9 November 2013	Germany	43–14	Poland	Sportforum Hohenschönhausen, Berlin	European Nation Cup Div. 1B; 2015 RWC European qualifier		Report
9 November 2013	Moldova	50–20	Sweden	Dinamo Stadium, Chişinău	European Nation Cup Div. 1B; 2015 RWC European qualifier		Report
9 November 2013	Malta	37–18	Croatia	Hibernians Ground, Paola	European Nation Cup Div. 2A		Report
9 November 2013	Netherlands	34–25	Lithuania	Sportpark Wouterland, Castricum	European Nation Cup Div. 2A		Report
9 November 2013	Slovenia	3–34	Cyprus	Stadion Oval, Gunclje	European Nation Cup Div. 2C		Report
9 November 2013	Luxembourg	12–24	Bosnia and Herzegovina	Stade Josy Barthel, Luxembourg	European Nation Cup Div. 2D		Report
9 November 2013	England	31–12	Argentina	Twickenham Stadium, London	End-of-year tests	Investec Challenge	Report
9 November 2013	France	19–26	New Zealand	Stade de France, Saint-Denis	End-of-year tests	Dave Gallaher Trophy	Report
9 November 2013	Italy	20–50	Australia	Stadio Olimpico di Torino, Turin	End-of-year tests		Report
9 November 2013	Ireland	40–9	Samoa	Aviva Stadium, Dublin	End-of-year tests		Report
9 November 2013	Scotland	42–17	Japan	Murrayfield Stadium, Edinburgh	End-of-year tests		Report
9 November 2013	Wales	15–24	South Africa	Millennium Stadium, Cardiff	End-of-year tests	Prince William Cup	Report
9 November 2013	Georgia	19–15	Canada	Dinamo Arena, Tbilisi	End-of-year tests		Report
9 November 2013	Romania	19–18	Tonga	Stadionul Arcul de Triumf, Bucharest	End-of-year tests		Report
9 November 2013	Portugal	13–36	Fiji	Universitario Lisboa, Lisbon	End-of-year tests		Report
9 November 2013	Chile	3–26	Spain	Centro de Alto Rendimiento del Rugby, Santiago	End-of-year tests		Report
9 November 2013	United States	19–29	Māori All Blacks	PPL Park, Chester, Pennsylvania	Māori All Blacks tour		Report
9 November 2013	Belgium	12–36	French Universities	Stade des Trois Tilleuls, Boitsfort	Non-test match		Report
10 November 2013	Oxford University	24–31	Russia	Oxford University Sports Centre, Oxford	Non-test match		Report
12 November 2013	Kenya	14–29	Zimbabwe	Hage Geingob Rugby Stadium, Windhoek, Namibia (NV)	Namibian Tri-Nations		Report
12 November 2013	Gloucester	40–5	Japan	Kingsholm Stadium, Gloucester	Non-test Tour match		Report
15 November 2013	Russia	13–40	Japan	Eirias Stadium, Colwyn Bay, Wales (NV)	End-of-year tests		Report
15 November 2013	Brazil	0–68	Portugal	Arena Barueri, Barueri, São Paulo	End-of-year tests		Report
16 November 2013	Czech Republic	10–17	Ukraine	Stadionu Mládeže, Zlín	European Nation Cup Div. 1B; 2015 RWC European qualifier		Report
16 November 2013	Moldova	30–15	Germany	Dinamo Stadium, Chişinău	European Nation Cup Div. 1B; 2015 RWC European qualifier		Report
16 November 2013	Switzerland	20–20	Netherlands	Stade de Colovray, Nyon	European Nation Cup Div. 2A		Report
16 November 2013	Namibia	55–35	Kenya	Hage Geingob Rugby Stadium, Windhoek	Namibian Tri-Nations		Report
16 November 2013	England	22–30	New Zealand	Twickenham Stadium, London	End-of-year tests	Hillary Shield	Report
16 November 2013	France	38–18	Tonga	Stade Océane, Le Havre	End-of-year tests		Report
16 November 2013	Ireland	15–32	Australia	Aviva Stadium, Dublin	End-of-year tests	Lansdowne Cup	Report
16 November 2013	Italy	37–31	Fiji	Stadio Giovanni Zini, Cremona	End-of-year tests		Report
16 November 2013	Wales	40–6	Argentina	Millennium Stadium, Cardiff	End-of-year tests		Report
16 November 2013	Georgia	23–25	United States	Mikheil Meskhi Stadium, Tbilisi	End-of-year tests		Report
16 November 2013	Romania	21–20	Canada	Stadionul Arcul de Triumf, Bucharest	End-of-year tests		Report
16 November 2013	Uruguay	16–15	Spain	Estadio Charrúa, Montevideo	End-of-year tests		Report
16 November 2013	French Barbarians	20–19	Samoa	Stade Marcel-Michelin, Clermont-Ferrand	Tour match		Report
17 November 2013	Scotland	0–28	South Africa	Murrayfield Stadium, Edinburgh	End-of-year tests		Report
17 November 2013	Slovakia	18–10	Azerbaijan	Štadión Čunovo, Bratislava	European Nation Cup Div. 3A		Report
20 November 2013	Turkey	31–3	Azerbaijan	Štadión Čunovo, Bratislava, Slovakia (NV)	European Nation Cup Div. 3A		Report
22 November 2013	Wales	17–7	Tonga	Millennium Stadium, Cardiff	End-of-year tests		Report
23 November 2013	Andorra	22–11	Denmark	Camp d'Esports del M.I. Consell General, Andorra la Vella	European Nation Cup Div. 2B; 2015 RWC European qualifier		Report
23 November 2013	Slovakia	3–55	Turkey	Štadión Čunovo, Bratislava, Slovakia	European Nation Cup Div. 3A		Report
23 November 2013	France	10–19	South Africa	Stade de France, Saint-Denis	End-of-year tests		Report
23 November 2013	Italy	14–19	Argentina	Stadio Olimpico, Rome	End-of-year tests		Report
23 November 2013	Scotland	15–21	Australia	Murrayfield Stadium, Edinburgh	End-of-year tests	Hopetoun Cup	Report
23 November 2013	Georgia	16–15	Samoa	Mikheil Meskhi Stadium, Tbilisi	End-of-year tests		Report
23 November 2013	Romania	7–26	Fiji	Stadionul Arcul de Triumf, Bucharest	End-of-year tests		Report
23 November 2013	Russia	7–28	United States	Allianz Park, London, England (NV)	End-of-year tests		Report
23 November 2013	Portugal	8–52	Canada	Universitário Lisboa, Lisbon	End-of-year tests		Report
23 November 2013	Spain	7–40	Japan	Estadio Nacional Complutense, Madrid	End-of-year tests		Report
24 November 2013	Ireland	22–24	New Zealand	Aviva Stadium, Dublin	End-of-year tests		Report
30 November 2013	Cyprus	22–8	Austria	Pafiako Stadium, Paphos	European Nation Cup Div. 2C		Report
30 November 2013	Barbarians	43–19	Fiji	Twickenham Stadium, London	Centenary Match	Killik Cup	Report
30 November 2013	Wales	26–30	Australia	Millennium Stadium, Cardiff	End-of-year test	James Bevan Trophy	Report

== December ==
Match results
Date	Match			Venue	Tournament/Trophy	Report
1 December 2013	Costa Rica	71–3	El Salvador	Liceo Franco Costarricense, Costa Rica	South American Rugby Championship Div. C	Report
1 December 2013	Guatemala	23–11	Ecuador	Liceo Franco Costarricense, Costa Rica (NV)	South American Rugby Championship Div. C	Report
4 December 2013	Costa Rica	7–13	Ecuador	Liceo Franco Costarricense, Costa Rica	South American Rugby Championship Div. C	Report
4 December 2013	Guatemala	18–43	El Salvador	Liceo Franco Costarricense, Costa Rica (NV)	South American Rugby Championship Div. C	Report
7 December 2013	Costa Rica	59–10	Guatemala	Liceo Franco Costarricense, Costa Rica	South American Rugby Championship Div. C	Report
7 December 2013	Ecuador	33–12	El Salvador	Liceo Franco Costarricense, Costa Rica (NV)	South American Rugby Championship Div. C	Report
7 December 2013	Nicaragua	7–12	Panama	Liceo Franco Costarricense, Costa Rica (NV)	Test match	
15 December 2013	DR Congo	8–5	Congo	Kinshasa	Test match	
17 December 2013	Hong Kong	28–17	Belgium	King's Park, Hong Kong	End-of-year tests	Report
21 December 2013	Hong Kong	18–15	Belgium	Hong Kong Football Club Stadium, Hong Kong	End-of-year tests	Report
