= 2013 Namibian Tri-Nations =

Tournament details
- Host: Namibia
- Venue: Hage Geingob Stadium
- Date: 8 November 2013– 16 November 2013
- Countries: Namibia; Kenya; Zimbabwe
- Teams: 3

The Namibian Tri-Nations tournament is the second edition of the Tier 3 African tournament that coincides with the 2013 end-of-year rugby union tests. With 2012 Champions Spain touring South America in the 2013 end-of-year international window, Kenya will join hosts Namibia and Zimbabwe over the 3 match days.

The tournament will return to the Hage Geingob Rugby Stadium in Windhoek over 3 match days with in a period of a week, 8 November - 16 November. Coincidentally, the three teams competing will all compete in the 2014 Africa Cup Division 1A tournament along with Madagascar who is competing in the Serendib International Cup.

== Table ==
Place	Nation	Games				Points			Bonus points		Table points
Place	Nation	Played	Won	Drawn	Lost	For	Against	Difference	4 Tries	7 Point Loss	Table points
1	Namibia	2	2	0	0	90	61	+29	2	0	10
2	Zimbabwe	2	1	0	1	55	49	+6	0	0	4
3	Kenya	2	0	0	2	49	84	-35	0	0	0

== Matches ==
=== Namibia v Zimbabwe ===
8 November 2013
20:00 WAST (UTC+2)

Namibia	35 - 26	Zimbabwe

Hage Geingob Rugby Stadium, Windhoek
Referee: Jonathan Kaplan (South Africa)

=== Kenya v Zimbabwe ===
12 November 2013
20:00 WAST (UTC+2)

Kenya	14 - 29	Zimbabwe

Hage Geingob Rugby Stadium, Windhoek
Referee: Jackie Husselmann (Namibia)

=== Namibia v Kenya ===
16 November 2013
20:00 WAST (UTC+2)

Namibia	55-35	Kenya

Hage Geingob Rugby Stadium, Windhoek
Referee: Jonathan Kaplan (South Africa)

== See also ==
- 2013 end-of-year rugby union tests
- 2013 mid-year rugby union tests
- 2013 Africa Cup
- Serendib International Cup
