= Serendib International Cup =

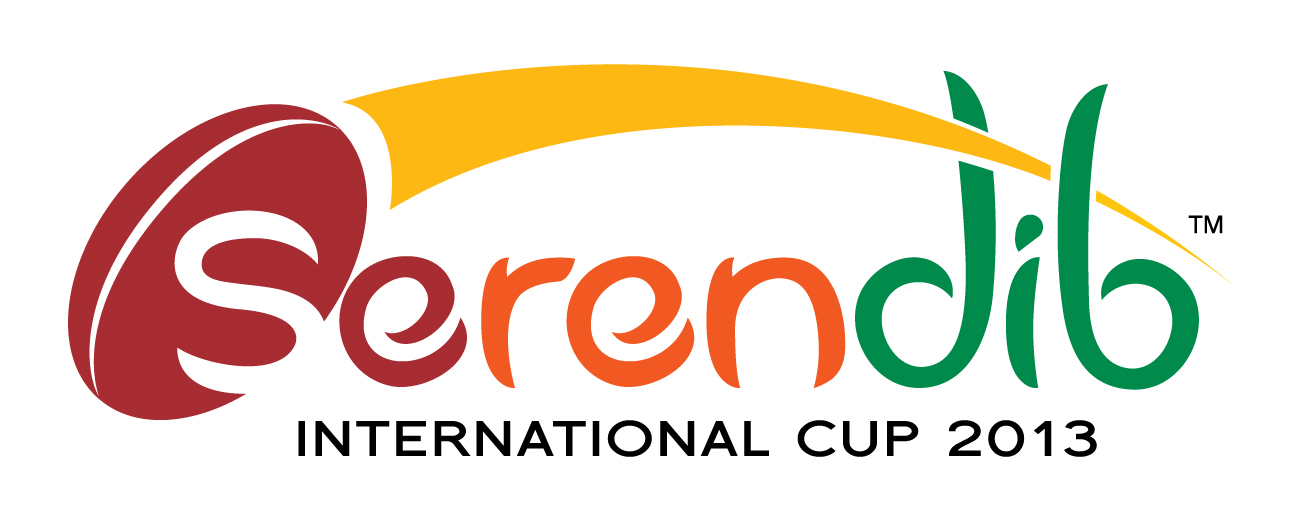

Tournament details
- Host: Sri Lanka
- Venue: Colombo Racecourse
- Date: 26 Oct – 1 Nov 2013
- Countries: Madagascar; Poland; Sri Lanka
- Teams: 3

Final positions
- Champions: Madagascar
- Runner-up: Sri Lanka
- Third place: Poland

Tournament statistics
- Matches played: 3
- Tries scored: 13 (4.33 per match)
- Top scorer(s): (Sri Lanka) Riza Mubarak (28)
- Most tries: (Madagascar) Bernard Razafindranaivo (3)

The Serendib International Cup (known as the Dialog Serendib International Cup for sponsorship reasons) was an international rugby union competition for emerging nations held in Sri Lanka in 2013 (Serendib is the old Arabic, Persian and Urdu name for Sri Lanka). The Serendib Cup was contested by the hosts Sri Lanka and the Malagasy and Polish national rugby teams. The tournament was backed by the International Rugby Board and was played over three match days in Colombo between 26 October and 1 November, coinciding with the 2013 end-of-year rugby union tests.

The tournament served as a pan-regional competition in Asia that will further the profile of Asian rugby and international rugby in Sri Lanka, as the region prepares to host the Rugby World Cup for the first time in 2019 in Japan. The tournament also provided an invaluable platform to step up in performance and ranking for all three Unions as well as the opportunity for the emerging nations to play internationals matches outside of their own region.

This competition was intended to promote cooperation between growing rugby unions that were showing higher levels of participation and sporting interests. Long-term goals are aimed at organising the competition as a second World Cup with a larger number of participating countries (up to 16 or 24). It is argued that this competition helps to develop the competitive abilities of Sri Lankan rugby players in the context of Asia.

The competition was won by Madagascar following their 17–12 victory over the hosts on Day 1, and their 25–21 victory over Poland on Day 2.

== Background ==
Sri Lanka has one of the largest number of registered players in the world currently boasting 58,000 players, positioning the Union within the top 15 in the world. With Sri Lanka's win the 2013 Asian Five Nations division 1, the 2014 Asian Five Nations will see their return to the top ranks of the championships. This tournament will be preparation for the Union's high performance programme for next year's Asian 5 Nations. The winner will qualify directly to 2015 Rugby World Cup as Asia 1, while the runner-up will enter the Repechage.

For the development of the sport in Sri Lanka, the hosting of such a tournament is key in growing awareness by building stronger commercial and broadcasting platforms. It comes in addition to the annual Asian Five Nations Asian championship, founded in 2008. Rugby in Sri Lanka is currently worth more than 1–2 billion Rupees and is widespread throughout the country. According to SLRFU President Asanga Seneviratne rugby could become Sri Lanka's most popular sport within the next decade. The SLRFU envisions the tournament to becoming a second-tier world cup.

Namal Rajapaksa has been named as the captain of the Sri Lankan team ahead of the tournament, as Yoshitha Rajapaksa is out of the squad due to injuries.

== Format ==
The tournament is a round-robin, where each team plays one match against each of the other teams, with points being awarded at the end of each match: 4 points for a win, 3 points for a draw and 0 points for a loss. Bonus points are also awarded: 1 point for scoring 4 tries or more in a match whether the team loses or not and 1 point for a loss within 7 game points. A loss by 8 points or more would give the team no bonus point.

== Participants ==
=== Table ===
Position	Nation	Games				Points			Bonus points	Total points
Position	Nation	Played	Won	Drawn	Lost	For	Against	Difference	Bonus points	Total points
1	Madagascar (44)	2	2	0	0	42	33	+9	0	8
2	Sri Lanka (39)	2	1	0	1	38	42	-4	1	5
3	Poland (28)	2	0	0	2	46	51	-5	2	2

Pre-tournament IRB rankings in parentheses.

Points are awarded to the teams as follows:

Results	Points
Win	4 points
Draw	3 points
4 or more tries	1 point
Loss within 7 points	1 point
Loss greater than 7 points	0 points

== Fixtures ==
All matches are to be played under lights.

=== Sri Lanka v Madagascar ===
26 October 2013
17:30 SLST (UTC+5:30)

Sri Lanka	12–17	Madagascar
Pen: Mubarak (4/6) 5', 26', 31', 74'	Report	Try: Rakotonirina 19' m Razafindranaivo 55' c Tolotra Ramaromiantso 79' m Con: Rakoto (1/3) 56'

Colombo Racecourse, Colombo
Referee: (Japan) Taku Otsuki (JRFU)

=== Madagascar v Poland ===
29 October 2013
17:30 SLST (UTC+5:30)

Madagascar	25–21	Poland
Try: Razafindranaivo (2) 12' c, 15' c Rakotoarivelo 43' m Con: Rakoto (2/3) 13', 15', Pen: Rakoto (0/1); Drop: Rakoto (2/3) 33', 46'	Report	Try: Sirocki 36' c Pawelec 68' m Con: Banaszek (1/2) 36'; Pen: Banaszek (3/4) 8', 29', 40'

Colombo Racecourse, Colombo
Referee: (Sri Lanka) Irshad Cader (SLRFU)

=== Sri Lanka v Poland ===
1 November 2013
19:30 SLST (UTC+5:30)

Sri Lanka	26–25	Poland
Try: Fernando (2) 37' c, 56' c Con: Mubarak (2/2) 36', 57'; Pen: Mubarak (3/5) 21', 34', 52'; Drop: Mubarak 61'	Report	Try: Bachurzewski 18' c Pawelec 31' m Sirocilli 77' c Con: Banaszek (2/3) 18', 78'; Pen: Banaszek (2/4) 27', 50',

Colombo Racecourse, Colombo
Referee: (Japan) Taku Otsuki (JRFU)

== Statistics ==
=== Points scorers ===
Pos	Name	Team	Pts
1	Riza Mubarak	Sri Lanka	28
2	Dawid Benaszek	Poland	21
3	Bernard Razafindranaivo	Madagascar	15
4	José Rakoto	Madagascar	12
6	Niroshan Fernando	Sri Lanka	10
7	Craig Bachurzewski	Poland	5
7	Dawid Pawelec	Poland	5
7	Robert Pawelec	Poland	5
7	Benjainina Rakotoarivelo	Madagascar	5
7	Alain Rakotonirina	Madagascar	5
7	Ratsimba Tolotra Ramaromiantso	Madagascar	5
7	Szymon Sirocki	Poland	5
7	Tomasz Sirocili	Poland	5

=== Try scorers ===
Pos	Name	Team	Tries
1	Bernard Razafindranaivo	Madagascar	3
2	Niroshan Fernando	Sri Lanka	2
3	Craig Bachurzewski	Poland	1
3	Dawid Pawelec	Poland	1
3	Robert Pawelec	Poland	1
3	Benjainina Rakotoarivelo	Madagascar	1
3	Alain Rakotonirina	Madagascar	1
3	Ratsimba Tolotra Ramaromiantso	Madagascar	1
3	Szymon Sirocki	Poland	1
3	Tomasz Sirocili	Poland	1

== Squads ==
Sri Lanka

The SLRU announced their 28 man squad on 26 October. Head Coach: (Sri Lanka) Ronnie Ibrahim

Note: Flags indicate national union for the club/province as defined by World Rugby.

Player	Position	Date of birth (age)	Caps	Club/province
Bilal Hassan	Hooker	{{{age}}}	{{{caps}}}	Sri Lanka Navy Sports
N. A. Jayalal	Hooker	{{{age}}}	{{{caps}}}	Sri Lanka Army Sports Club
Namal Rajapaksa (c)	Hooker	10 April 1986 (age 40)	{{{caps}}}	Sri Lanka Navy Sports
Achala Perera	Prop			(Sri Lanka) Kandy Sports Club
Duminda Pullikuttiarachi	Prop			(Sri Lanka)
Dushmantha Priyadarshana	Prop			(Sri Lanka) Havelock Sports Club
Eranga Swarnathilake	Prop			Sri Lanka Army Sports Club
Henry Terance	Prop			(Sri Lanka) Havelock Sports Club
Hasitha Perera	Lock			(Sri Lanka)
Sathya Ranatunga	Lock			Sri Lanka Navy Sports
Danushka Perera	Flanker			Sri Lanka Navy Sports
Ishan Noor	Flanker			(Sri Lanka) Ceylonese Rugby & Football Club
Rohitha Rajapaksa	Flanker			Sri Lanka Navy Sports
Sharo Fernando	Flanker			(Sri Lanka) Upcountry Lions
Sajith Saranga	Number 8			(Sri Lanka) Upcountry Lions
Kavindu de Costa	Scrum-half			(Sri Lanka)
Rehan Weerakoon	Scrum-half			Sri Lanka Navy Sports
Dave Anand	Fly-half			(Sri Lanka)
Fazil Marija	Fly-half			(Sri Lanka) Kandy Sports Club
Niroshan Fernando	Fly-half			(Sri Lanka) Havelock Sports Club
Dinusha Chathuranga Fernando	Centre			(Sri Lanka)
Lavanka Perera	Centre			(Sri Lanka)
Lee Keegal	Centre			(Sri Lanka)
Pradeep Liyanage	Centre			(Sri Lanka) Kandy Sports Club
Chamara Dabare	Wing			(Sri Lanka) Havelock Sports Club
Sandun Herath	Wing			(Sri Lanka) Havelock Sports Club
Nuwan Hettiarachi	Fullback			Sri Lanka Navy Sports
Riza Mubarak	Fullback			Sri Lanka Navy Sports

Poland

Poland's 21 man squad was announce on 17 October. Head Coach: Tomasz Putra

Note: Flags indicate national union for the club/province as defined by World Rugby.

Player	Position	Date of birth (age)	Caps	Club/province
Craig Bachurzewski	Prop	{{{age}}}	{{{caps}}}	(Scotland) Glasgow Hawks
Adrian Chróściel	Prop	{{{age}}}	{{{caps}}}	(Poland) MKP Pogoń Siedlce
Mateusz Bartoszek	Flanker	20 January 1990 (aged 23)	12	(Scotland) Glasgow Hawks
Paweł Dąbrowski	Flanker	13 May 1981 (aged 32)		(Poland) RC Arka Gdynia
Karol Perzak	Lock			(Poland) RC Arka Gdynia
Piotr Zeszutek	Flanker			
Marek Płonka	Flanker			(Poland) RC Lechia Gdańsk
Cyprian Majcher	Prop			(Poland) RC Lechia Gdańsk
Stanisław Niedźwiedzki	Hooker			
Rafał Janeczko	Scrum-half			(Poland) RC Lechia Gdańsk
Dawid Banaszek	Fly-half	4 February 1987 (aged 26)	19	(Poland) Arka Gdynia
Dawid Lorentowicz	Fly-half			(Poland) MKP Pogoń Siedlce
Marek Przychodzki	??			
Rafał Szrejber	Centre			(Poland) RC Arka Gdynia
Robert Pawelec	Centre			(Poland) MKP Pogoń Siedlce
Tomasz Rokicki	Centre			(Poland) RC Lechia Gdańsk
Szymon Sirocki	Wing			(Poland) RC Arka Gdynia
Tomasz Gasik	Centre			(Poland) MKP Pogoń Siedlce
Sebastian Łuczak	Centre			
Robert Kwiatkowski	??			

Madagascar

Madagascar's 29 man squad was announce on 18 October. Head Coach: Bertin Rafalimanana

Note: Flags indicate national union for the club/province as defined by World Rugby.

Player	Position	Date of birth (age)	Caps	Club/province
Rantoniaina Hasina Rakotoarivelo	??	{{{age}}}	{{{caps}}}	{{{club}}}
Christian Jean Felix Andrianjaka	??	{{{age}}}	{{{caps}}}	{{{club}}}
Maroson Vonjiniaina Andriamananjara	??	{{{age}}}	{{{caps}}}	{{{club}}}
Dimbiniaina Jean Willy Rabemananjara	??	{{{age}}}	{{{caps}}}	{{{club}}}
Rodolphe Randriamanantena	??	{{{age}}}	{{{caps}}}	{{{club}}}
Hajanirina Randrianambinina	??	{{{age}}}	{{{caps}}}	{{{club}}}
Ratsimba Tolotra Ramaromiantso	??	{{{age}}}	{{{caps}}}	{{{club}}}
Tahina Hery Zo Randrianarisoa	??	{{{age}}}	{{{caps}}}	{{{club}}}
Maminandrasana Solomampionona	??	{{{age}}}	{{{caps}}}	{{{club}}}
Tolotra Claudio Ravelonomenjanahary	??	{{{age}}}	{{{caps}}}	{{{club}}}
Guy Rolland Randriamiarana	??	{{{age}}}	{{{caps}}}	{{{club}}}
Nirina Jacky Bayard	??	{{{age}}}	{{{caps}}}	{{{club}}}
Romuald Rafaralahy	??	{{{age}}}	{{{caps}}}	{{{club}}}
José Rakoto (c)	??	{{{age}}}	{{{caps}}}	{{{club}}}
Juliot Mahavy	??	{{{age}}}	{{{caps}}}	{{{club}}}
Deraniaina Rakotozafy	??	{{{age}}}	{{{caps}}}	{{{club}}}
Alain Rakotonirina	??	{{{age}}}	{{{caps}}}	{{{club}}}
Serge Rajoelina	??	{{{age}}}	{{{caps}}}	{{{club}}}
Benjaniaina Mandimby Rakotoarivelo	??	{{{age}}}	{{{caps}}}	{{{club}}}
Soloniaina Herizo Rasoanaivo	??	{{{age}}}	{{{caps}}}	{{{club}}}
Bernard Razafindranaivo	??	{{{age}}}	{{{caps}}}	{{{club}}}
Tiana Nirina Ravelomanantsoa	??	{{{age}}}	{{{caps}}}	{{{club}}}
Tolotra Mampionontsoa Rakotoson	??	{{{age}}}	{{{caps}}}	{{{club}}}
Michael Raharijaona	??	{{{age}}}	{{{caps}}}	{{{club}}}

== Sponsorship & Broadcasting rights ==
Dialog are the title sponsors of the tournament as the premier sports sponsors in the country, while MTV Sports is set to broadcast all matches live as the tournament's official broadcaster. Atom Technologies is the other principal sponsor of the tournament as well as the official digital signage provider at all the matches.

== See also ==
- 2013 IRB Tbilisi Cup
- 2013 end-of-year rugby union tests
