= Jonathan Kaplan (rugby union) =

Rugby player (born 1966)

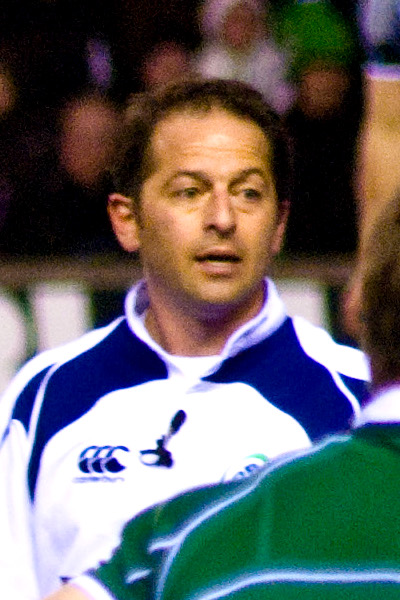
- Kaplan officiating a 2009 match
- Born: 7 November 1966 (age 60) Durban, South Africa

Rugby union career
Refereeing career
Years	Competition	Apps
1999–2011	Rugby World Cup	13
1996–2013	Test matches	70
–	Super Rugby	107
–	Currie Cup	161

Jonathan Isaac Kaplan (born 7 November 1966 in Durban, South Africa), is a former international rugby union referee who used to hold the record for the most international matches as referee.

He announced his retirement on 26 October 2013 and took charge of the 2013 Currie Cup Final between Western Province and the Sharks as his final domestic league match as referee. His final test match as a referee was on 16 November 2013 when he took charge of the Namibia v Kenya match in the final fixture of the 2013 Namibian Tri-Nations in Windhoek.

== Background ==
Kaplan was born in Durban to Jewish parents, and was educated at Carmel College, Durban, and King David School, Linksfield, Johannesburg. He gained a bachelor of social sciences degree, with majors in economics and psychology, from the University of Cape Town and a postgraduate degree in marketing management from the University of South Africa.

== Refereeing career ==
Kaplan began refereeing in 1984, while still a high school student. He made his first-class debut in 1991 and was appointed to South Africa's national panel of referees in 1993. On 4 May 1996 he made his international debut in a match between Namibia and Zimbabwe in Harare.

He was appointed as a touch judge for the 1999 Rugby World Cup, and as a referee for the 2003 Rugby World Cup in Australia, where he took charge of three pool games and the quarter-final between France and Ireland. He was one of the twelve referees appointed to officiate at the 2007 Rugby World Cup in France, and took charge of four pool games and the semi-final between England and France, and also at the 2011 Rugby World Cup where he refereed Tonga v Canada, Canada v Japan, England v Georgia & Ireland v Italy, he was also an Assistant Referee in the Semi-final between Wales & France. Jonathan become the first South African to officiate at four World Cups, and referee at three.

Some of Kaplan's other notable games in charge include the first ever game in the Six Nations Championship, between Italy and Scotland in 2000, the second test between the British & Irish Lions and Australia in 2001 and the third test between the Lions and New Zealand in 2005.

Kaplan was the referee for the 2005 Super 12 final and the 2006 Super 14 final (a game notorious for the dense fog which obscured much of the action from spectators and commentators). In December 2008 he was chosen as one of nine referees on a merit panel who, it was intended, would between them have charge of 75% of 2009 Super 14 matches irrespective of the nationality of the teams involved. In line with this policy, Kaplan was appointed to referee the 2009 Super 14 Final; in previous years he would have been debarred from officiating because of the involvement of a South African team. In late 2009, he was again named on the merit panel for the 2010 Super 14.

In October 2008 he took charge of the final of South Africa's premier domestic competition, the Currie Cup, for the fourth time, and was the referee again for the 2009 final.

On 12 February 2013, Kaplan announced his retirement from refereeing as of the end of the season.

== Records ==
Kaplan was previously the most experienced Test referee of all time: he became the first referee to reach the milestone of 50 Test matches when he refereed the Scotland-Ireland game during the 2009 Six Nations Championship, and has since increased his total to 70 Tests (as at his retirement). The record is now 100, held by Nigel Owens.

He also holds the record for refereeing the most Tests involving a single team: the New Zealand-Wales game in June 2010 was his 17th involving the host nation (ending up in 18), surpassing the record of 16 matches previously held jointly by Welshman Derek Bevan (also refereeing New Zealand) and New Zealander Paul Honiss (refereeing Australia).

Other refereeing records held by Kaplan are: most Bledisloe Cup matches (8); most Tri Nations matches (8); most Six Nations matches (18); only referee to have participated in four British & Irish Lions tours and to have had charge of matches in all three tour countries (Free State v B&I Lions, South Africa 1997; 2nd Test, Australia 2001; 3rd Test, New Zealand 2005; Sharks v B&I Lions, South Africa 2009).

Kaplan also holds South African refereeing records for most Rugby World Cup appearances (4: 1999 (as a touch judge), 2003, 2007, 2011) and most World Cup games (13 – 5 as a touch judge) most Super 14 games (107, including 3 finals and 4 semi-finals); and most Currie Cup matches (161, including 6 finals and 4 semi-finals); and is the only referee to have won the award as South African Referee of the Year for four years in succession (2003–07)and 5 overall.

== Honours ==
In 2024, at the South African Jewish Board of Deputies' 120th anniversary gala dinner, he was honoured among 100 remarkable Jewish South Africans who have contributed to South Africa. The ceremony included speeches from Chief Rabbi Ephraim Mirvis, and Kaplan was honoured among other sports figures such as Jody Scheckter, Ali Bacher and Joel Stransky.
