= 2013 NACRA Rugby Championship =

- Champions: USA Rugby South
- Runners-up: Trinidad and Tobago

The 2013 NACRA Rugby Championship was a rugby union championship for Tier 3 North American and Caribbean teams, and took place between January and June, 2013.

The top four teams from the second round of 2012 NACRA Championship qualified for the second round of the 2013 championship, while the third place team from the north and south pools of the 2012 championship qualified for the final games of the first round.

The championship was split between north and south, with the winner of each division playing in a final game.

This was the first game in the NACRA Championship for Curaçao and Turks and Caicos Islands.

== Round 1 ==
=== Round 1a - North ===
Semi-finals
Jan 19, 2013
Turks and Caicos Islands	13
Jamaica	31
Jan 19, 2013
USA South	50
Mexico	23

Final
Feb 23, 2013
Jamaica	12
USA South	29

Winner qualifies for Round 1b - North

Semi-finals

Jan 19, 2013	Turks and Caicos Islands	13 – 31	Jamaica	Meridian Field Providenciales, Turks and Caicos Islands
15:00	Try: Sean O'Neill, Penalty Try; Pen: Jamie Tait	Report	Try: Renaldo Wade 2, Hubert Thomas 2, Dervon Balfour; Con: Errick Groves 3	Referee: (United States) Ed Gardner

Jan 19, 2013	USA South	50 – 23	Mexico	Life University, Marietta, USA
	Try: Lucas Baistrocchi, Clint Whitler, Derek Wolfe, Cathal Doyle, Kurt Swanner, Ben Winiarczyk, Bou-Mikael Saade, Amir Khan; Con: Lucas Baistrocchi 5	Report	Try: Roberto Calderon, Rigel Galindo, Jesus Burgos; Con: Christian Henning; Pen: Christian Henning 2

Final

Feb 23, 2013	Jamaica	12 – 29	USA South	Utech Field, Kingston, Jamaica
15:00	Try: Hubert Thomas, Everton Richards; Con: Everton Richards	Report	Try: Lucas Baistrocci 2, Amir Khan; Con: Lucas Baistrocci; Pen: Lucas Baistrocci 4	Referee: (Cayman Islands) Alasdair Robertson

=== Round 1a - South ===
Semi-finals
Jan 26, 2013
Saint Lucia	35
British Virgin Islands	41
Jan 12, 2013
Curaçao	37
Saint Vincent and the Grenadines	24

Final
Feb 15, 2013
British Virgin Islands	12
Curaçao	39

Winner qualifies for Round 1b - South

Semi-final

Jan 12, 2013	Curaçao	37 – 24	Saint Vincent and the Grenadines	University of the Netherlands Antilles, Willemstad, Curaçao
14:00	Try: Tjakko Brueur 3, Cris Tjon, Arlito Dos Pasos, Rob Perry; Con: James Breinburg 2 Pen: James Breinburg	Report (Dutch); Report (NACRA)	Try: Phillip Alvis 2, Kevin Bailey, Anizo Lewis; Con: Anizo Lewis 2	Attendance: 200; Referee: (Netherlands) Piet Veldhuizen

Jan 19, 2013	Saint Lucia	35 – 41	British Virgin Islands	Corinth Playing Field, Corinth, St Lucia
	Try: Uranus Dennis, Colvis Samuels, Akim Stewart, Jerry Charles; Cyricaus Isidore; Con: Colvis Samuels 2 Pen: Colvis Samuels 2	Report	Try: Andre Adams 3, Dustyn Molver 2, Tom Chapman; Con: Dustyn Molver; Pen: Dustyn Molver 3	Referee: (Saint Vincent and the Grenadines) Cliff Jones

Final

Feb 15, 2013	British Virgin Islands	12 – 39	Curaçao	A.O. Shirley Recreation Ground, Road Town, British Virgin Islands
18:00	Try: Jerome Springette, Dustyn Molver; Con: Dustyn Molver	Report	Try: Vincent Piettersz 2, Curtleyson Martis, Sevan Ekker, One More Try; Con: James Brienberg 4 Pen: James Brienberg 2	Referee: (United States) Tim Luscombe

=== Round 1b - North ===
The Bahamas hosted a game against the winner of Round 1a - North (USA South). The winner progressed to Round 2 - North to take on Bermuda and Cayman Islands.

Apr 13, 2013	Bahamas	15 – 42	USA South	Nassau, The Bahamas

=== Round 1b - South ===
Barbados hosted game against the winner of Round 1a - South (Curaçao). The winner progressed to Round 2 - South to take on Guyana and Trinidad & Tobago.

Apr 6, 2013	Barbados	41 – 3	Curaçao	Bridgetown, Barbados

== Round 2 ==
Round 2 was played in regional single round robin (two games for each team). The top team from the North pool and South pool progressed to the NACRA Championship final.

=== Round 2 - North ===
May 4, 2013	USA South	9 – 7	Cayman Islands	Life University, Atlanta, Georgia
	Pen: Lucas Baisrocchi 3		Try: Robbie Cribb; Con: Robbie Cribb

May 18, 2013	Bermuda	14 – 24	USA South	Bermuda National Stadium, Devonshire Parish, Bermuda
	Try: Mikey Williams, Jahan Cedenio; Con: Andre Landy, Thomas Edwards	Report	Try: Derek Wolfe, Kirk Swanner, Ty Elkins; Con: Lucas Baistrocchi 3 Pen: Lucas Baistrocchi

June 1, 2013	Cayman Islands	20 – 14	Bermuda	Truman Bodden Sports Complex, George Town, Cayman Islands
16:00	Try: Chris Bunce, Penalty Try; Con: Morgan Haywood 2 Pen: Robbie Cribb 2	Cayman Rugby Report	Try: Tom Healy; Pen: Tommy Edwards 3	Attendance: 1,700; Referee: Chris Henshall (USA)

Place	Nation	Games				Points			Table points
Place	Nation	Played	Won	Drawn	Lost	For	Against	Difference	Table points
1	USA South	2	2	0	0	33	21	+12	8
2	Cayman Islands	2	1	0	1	27	23	4	5
3	Bermuda	2	0	0	2	28	44	-16	2

=== Round 2 - South ===
May 18, 2013	Guyana	19 – 17	Barbados	Providence Stadium, Providence, Guyana
	Try: Claudius Butts, Avery Corbin 2 Con: Ryan Gonsalves 2	Report	Try: Shaun English 2, Christian Preece; Con: Dwight Forde

May 25, 2013	Barbados	6–19	Trinidad and Tobago	Garrison Savannah, Bridgetown, Barbados
16:00	Pen: Leon Driscoll	Report	Try: James Phillip 2, Jamal Clark; Con: Kelson Figaro 2	Referee: Marc Nelson (USA)

June 1, 2013	Trinidad and Tobago	20 – 0	Guyana	UWI SPEC, Saint Augustine, Trinidad and Tobago
16:00	Try: Jessie Richards, Adam Frederick, Anthony Lopez; Con: Kelson Figaro; Pen: Kelson Figaro	Report		Referee: Pablo Septien (Mexico)

Place	Nation	Games				Points			Table points
Place	Nation	Played	Won	Drawn	Lost	For	Against	Difference	Table points
1	Trinidad and Tobago	2	2	0	0	39	6	+35	8
2	Guyana	2	1	1	0	19	37	-18	5
3	Barbados	2	0	0	2	23	38	-15	2

== Round 3 ==
The winning team from Round 2 - North played against the winning team from Round 2 South for the championship.

June 22, 2013	Trinidad and Tobago	18 – 26	USA South	Fatima College, Port of Spain, Trinidad and Tobago
15:00	Try: Joseph Quashie 2 (13', 46'), Wayne Kelly (36'); Pen: Kelson Figaro (18')	Report 1 Report 2	Try: Jeff Reuther (26'), Amir Khan (40'), Chance Doyle (79'); Con: Lucas Baistrocchi; Pen: Lucas Baistrocchi 3 (15', 22', 56')

USA South was the winner of the 2013 NACRA Rugby Championship. Matt Upton presumably won the MVP.

== See also ==
- NACRA Rugby Championship
