= Azat Abbasov =

Tatar opera singer

Azat Abbasov Азат Аббасов
- Born: 19 January 1925; Yelabuga, Tatar ASSR, Soviet Union
- Died: 11 October 2006 (aged 81) Kazan, Tatarstan, Russia
- Genres: Classical
- Occupation: Opera singer
- Instrument: Singing

Azat Zinnăt uly Abbasov (Note: Tatar: Азат Зиннәт улы Аббасов, romanized: Azat Zinnăt uly Abbasov, Tatar: [ʌˈbɑsəf ʌˈzɑt ziːnˈnæt uˈlɯ]; Russian: Азат Зиннатович Аббасов, romanized: Azat Zinnatovich Abbasov) (19 January 1925 – 11 October 2006) was a Tatar opera singer (lyric-dramatic tenor) who was awarded with the People's Artist of the USSR in 1977.

He graduated from Kazan Aviation Technical School and worked at the "Kazan Helicopters" plant as a designer. In 1944, when the friend of Abbasovs' family, Tatar composer Salix Säydäş advised him to devote himself to professional singing, Azat entered the Tatar National Opera Studio within the Moscow Conservatory. He graduated from the conservatory in 1950 and returned to Kazan. In 1950s-1990s he was a soloist of Kazan-based Musa Cälil Tatar Opera and Ballet Theatre.

Abbasov performed more than 100 parts in almost all leading performances. Major parts were Cälil, Tüläk (Cälil, Tülär and Susılu by Näcip Cihanov), Samat (Samat by Xösnulla Wäliulllin, Alfredo Gérmont (La traviata by Giuseppe Verdi), Sergey (Katerina Izmaylova by Dmitry Shostakovich).

He was known for the high vocal culture with an extremely accurate diction. His repertoire had large variety; it contained Russian, Tatar, and Western European opera classics. His merits in vocal art development are highly appreciated: he was given a rank of the Honoured Artist of Tatarstan, the People's and Honoured artist of Russia and the USSR.
