= Curaçao national rugby union team =

Curaçao
- Coach: Robert Perry
- Captain: Manu Jove
- Most caps: 8
- Top scorer: Robert Perry

First international
- Barbados A 18–5 Curaçao (Bridgetown, Barbados; 28 April 2012)

Largest win
- Curaçao 56–7 Saint Lucia (Blue Bay, Curaçao; 10 May 2014)

Largest defeat
- Barbados 55–7 Curaçao (Bridgetown, Barbados; 6 April 2019)

The Curaçao national rugby union team represents Curaçao in the sport of rugby union. The team plays international matches against other countries in the Caribbean region.

The team played its first international match at the 2013 NACRA Rugby Championship.

== Current squad ==
Squad to the 2015 NACRA Rugby Championship:

- Glenno Fransman
- Edel Calmes
- Carlos Hernandez
- Eelco te Molder*
- Marius van Noort
- Paulo de Sousa Feirra (c)
- Emanuel Koenders
- Junnyfer Fidanque
- Oscar Abril-Bonthuis
- Robert Perry
- Curtleyson Martis
- Derk Sonnenberg
- Arlito dos Passos
- Jedrick Magdalena
- Charlie Dekker

Substitutes

- Arthur Hogesteger
- Mark Verburg
- Varley Felipa*
- Duran Sikkerlad
- Erik Linsen
- Ulrich Tomasa
- Lando Pieters
- Jerwien Maduro

_{* newly capped players}

== Record ==
Below is a table of the representative rugby matches played by a Curaçao national XV at test level up until 10 December 2023, updated after match with Dominican Republic.

Opponent	Played	Won	Lost	Drawn	% Won
Barbados	3	0	3	0	0%
Barbados A	1	0	1	0	0%
British Virgin Islands	3	2	1	0	66.67%
Dominican Republic	4	0	4	0	0%
Guadeloupe	1	1	0	0	100%
Martinique	1	0	1	0	0%
Saint Lucia	3	2	1	0	66.67%
Saint Vincent and the Grenadines	3	2	0	1	66.67%
Turks and Caicos Islands	1	0	1	0	0%
Total	20	7	12	1	35%

== See also ==
- Curaçao Rugby Federation
