= 2012–2014 European Nations Cup Second Division =

2012–14 European Nations Cup
- Date: 2012–2014
- Countries: Division 2A: Croatia; Lithuania; Malta; Netherlands; Switzerland; Division 2B: Andorra; Denmark; Israel; Latvia; Serbia; Division 2C: Austria; Bulgaria; Cyprus; Hungary; Slovenia; Division 2D: Bosnia and Herzegovina; Finland; Greece; Luxembourg; Norway

Tournament statistics
- Matches played: Division 2A: 1 Division 2B: 4 Division 2C: 3 Division 2D: 2
- Top point scorer: Division 2A: (Netherlands) Bart Viguurs (44) Division 2B: (Serbia) Boris Martić (31) Division 2C: (Cyprus) Marcus Holden (75) Division 2D: (Bosnia and Herzegovina) Armin Vehabovic (45)
- Top try scorer: Division 2A: (Switzerland) Cyril Lin (3) Division 2B: (Israel) Eitan Humphreys (4) Division 2C: 4 Try scorers (4) Division 2D: 6 Try scorers (2)

The 2012–14 European Nations Cup Second Division is the third tier rugby union in Europe behind the Six Nations Championship and the 2012-2014 European Nations Cup First Division.

The second division comprises four pools (2A, 2B, 2C, and 2D). Teams within each division play each other in a home and away round robin schedule over a two-year period.

At the end of every season a champion was declared according but for relegation and promotion only the two years ranking are considered. The first in the 2012–2014 ranking of each pool will be promoted while last place teams will be relegated. Winners of pool 2A, will be promoted to division 1 pool B for the 2014–16 edition while the last place team in pool 2A will be relegated to pool 2B. Likewise, winners of 2B will be promoted to 2A, last place in 2B will be relegated to 2C, winner of 2C will be promoted to 2B, last place of 2C will be relegated to 2D, winner of 2D will be promoted to 2C and last place of 2D will be relegated to 3; The winner of 3 replacing the relegated 2D team. Additionally, there will be playoff matches between second place teams and fourth place teams between pools. Winners of these playoffs will determine if additional promotions/relegation occur. There will no playoff between the fourth of 2D and the second of 3.

In addition to the season competitions, the 2012–2013 seasons in all four pools doubles as a 2015 Rugby World Cup qualifier. The winning teams in each pool will play off for the chance to challenge the Division 1 teams for the repechage place for Europe.

== Division 2A ==
=== 2012–2013 ===
Table

2012–13 Champions & qualified for RWC 15 European Qualifiers Round 3

Place	Nation	Games				Points			Bonus points	Table points
Place	Nation	played	won	drawn	lost	for	against	difference	Bonus points	Table points
1	Netherlands (47)	4	4	0	0	125	57	+68	2	18
2	Switzerland (52)	4	3	0	1	92	75	+17	2	14
3	Croatia (44)	4	1	0	3	78	92	−14	3	7
4	Malta (45)	4	1	0	3	73	104	−31	1	5
5	Lithuania (36)	4	1	0	3	69	109	−40	0	4

Pre tournament rankings in parentheses.

Games

27 October 2012	Croatia	20–19	Malta	Makarska, Croatia
	Try: Nik Jurišić (24'), Tonći Buzov (51'); Con: Jai Ayoub 2 Pen: Jai Ayoub 2 (38', 40'+3'); Cards: Tomislav Burazin (yellow card) 54' to 64'	Team Sheet	Try: Vince Stivila (48'), Mark Davey (76'); Pen: James O'Brien 2 (3', 11'), Thomas Holloway (54')	Referee: (Czech Republic) Tomáš Tuma

3 November 2012	Malta	34–17	Lithuania	Hibernians Ground, Paola, Malta
	Try: Robert Hollaway (25'), Mark Davey (31'), Vince Stivala (59'); Con: James O'Brien 2 Pen: James O'Brien 5 (2', 8', 22' 34', 53'); Cards: Daniel Apsee (yellow card) 38' to 48'	Team Sheet	Try: Mindaugas Misevičius (39'), Tomas Zibolis (77'); Con: Kęstutis Marcišauskas 2 Pen: Kęstutis Marcišauskas (17'); Cards: Richardus Stankus (yellow card) 62' to 72'	Attendance: 3,000; Referee: (Belgium) Luc Janssens

3 November 2012	Switzerland	29–20	Croatia	Stade de Colovray, Nyon, Switzerland
	Try: Penalty Try (5'), Cyril Lin (37'), Matthieu Guyou (42'), Cyril Coulot (65'); Con: Simon Perrod 3 Pen: Simon Perrod (80'); Cards: Thibault Gery (yellow card) 71' to 80'	Team Sheet	Try: Filip Mijić (67'), Tomislav Burazin (73'), Mario Ozich (76'); Con: Jai Ayoub; Pen: Jai Ayoub (47')	Attendance: 1,053; Referee: (Spain) Pedro Montoya

10 November 2012	Lithuania	16–24	Netherlands	Radviliškio miesto centrinis stadionas, Šiauliai, Lithuania
	Try: Maksim Guseinov (67'); Con: Kęstutis Marcišauskas; Pen: Kęstutis Marcišauskas 3 (2', 35', 50')	Report	Try: Storm Carroll (38'), Richard van den Broek (63'); Con: Bart Viguurs; Pen: Bart Viguurs 4 (2', 8', 12', 46'); Cards: Jay Jay Boske (yellow card) 55' to 65'	Referee: (Russia) Alexey Bryzgalin

17 November 2012	Netherlands	24–7	Switzerland	Netherlands National Stadium, Amsterdam, Netherlands
	Try: Vincent Booiman (22'), Cain Elisara (33'); Con: Vincent Booiman; Pen: Vincent Booiman 4 (3', 13', 47', 67'); Cards: Vincent Grimbergen (yellow card) 60' to 70'	Team Sheet	Try: Simon Perrod (62'); Con: Simon Perrod; Cards: Cyril Coulot (yellow card) 12' to 22', Clément Bartschi (yellow card) 33' to 43'	Referee: (Germany) Frank Himmer

6 April 2013	Malta	10–19	Switzerland	Hibernians Football Stadium, Paola, Malta
	Try: Thomas Holloway (31'), James O'Brien (64'); Cards: Luke Watts (yellow card) 66' to 76'	Team Sheet	Try: Cyril Lin (14'), Mathieu Paul (69'); Pen: Simon Perrod 3 (4', 34', 60'); Cards: Cyril Lin (yellow card) 22' to 32', Nicolas Guyou (yellow card) 40' to 50'	Attendance: 3,000; Referee: (Romania) Vlad Iordăchescu

13 April 2013	Switzerland	37–21	Lithuania	Stade de Colovray, Nyon, Switzerland
	Try: Jake Serex (9'), Cyril Lin (33'), Jonathan Wullschleger (75'), Nicolas Dimitri (80'+7'); Con: Simon Perrod 2, Benjamin Doy 2 Pen: Simon Perrod 3 (6', 61', 65')	Team Sheet	Try: Mindaugas Misevisius (39'), Edmundas Grybauksas (52'); Con: Donastas Vilimavicius; Pen: Donastas Vilimavicius (19', 30', 63'); Cards: Karolis Navickas (yellow card) 74' to 80'	Attendance: 1,545; Referee: (Italy) Stefano Pennè

13 April 2013	Netherlands	48–10	Malta	Amsterdam National Stadium, Amsterdam, Netherlands
	Try: Sep Visser (24'), Vincent Booiman (27'), Vincent Grimbergen 2 (52', 56'), Huey Van Vliet 2 (67', 74'); Con: Bart Viguurs 4, Leon Koenen 2 Pen: Bart Viguurs 2	Team Sheet	Try: Toby Quarendon (72'); Con: Toby Quarendon; Pen: James O'Brien (47'); Cards: Clayton Cassar (yellow card) 18' to 28', Dominic Busuttil (yellow card) 51' to 61'	Attendance: 1,012; Referee: (Poland) Tomasz Jarowicz

20 April 2013	Croatia	24–29	Netherlands	Zagreb, Croatia
	Try: Paško Ivančić (38'), Penalty Try(50'), Jai Ayoub (56'), Ivan Miljak (80'); Con: Jai Ayoub 2	Team Sheet	Try: Bart Viguurs (13'), Rik van Balkom (16'), Sep Visser (30'), Cain Elisara (72'); Con: Bart Viguurs 3 Pen: Bart Viguurs (53'); Cards: Richard van den Broek (yellow card) 50' to 60'	Referee: (Poland) Zeszutek Marcin

27 April 2013	Lithuania	15–14	Croatia	Academy of Rugby, Vilnius, Lithuania
	Try: Mindaugas Norvaisas (9'), Donatas Vilimavicius (40'); Con: Donatas Vilimavicius; Pen: Andrius Sutkus (64'); Cards: Mantautas Vilimavicius (yellow card) 74' to 80'	Team Sheet	Try: Caleb Brown (76'); Pen: Jai Ayoub 3 (13', 30', 33')	Attendance: 2,000; Referee: (Russia) Volovik Vladimir

=== 2013–14 ===
Table

2013–14 Champions

Place	Nation	Games					Points			Table points
Place	Nation	played	won	drawn	lost	Bonus	for	against	difference	Table points
1	Netherlands	4	3	1	0	3	132	68	+64	17
2	Malta	4	3	0	1	1	89	75	+14	13
3	Lithuania	4	1	0	3	3	80	90	−106	7
4	Switzerland	4	1	1	2	1	78	84	−6	7
5	Croatia	4	1	0	3	0	67	129	−62	4

Games

2 November 2013	Lithuania	10–13	Malta	Vilnius, Lithuania
	Try: Mantatutas Vilimavicius (79'c); Con: Donatas Vilimavicius; Pen: Donatas Vilimavicius (71')	Team Sheet	Try: Samuel Borg (25'c); Con: James O'Brien; Pen: James O'Brien 2 (9', 80')	Attendance: 700; Referee: (Russia) Vadim Pikhovkin

2 November 2013	Croatia	11–26	Switzerland	Split, Croatia
	Try: Ivan Šuta (35'm); Pen: Jason Davor Newton 2 (7', 17')	Team Sheet	Try: Maxime Lucon (3'c), Cyril Lin (24'm), Jonathan Wullschleger (41'm); Con: Simon Perrod; Pen: Simon Perrod (15', 40', 78'); Cards: Romain Maitre (yellow card) 79' to 80'	Attendance: 1,500; Referee: (Czech Republic) Tomáš Tuma

9 November 2013	Malta	37–18	Croatia	Hibernians Ground, Paola, Malta
	Try: James Kirk (9'c), Dominic Busutill (18'c), Daniel Apsee (42'm), Vince Stivala (64'c), Oliver Sacco (79'm); Con: James O'Brien 3 Pen: James O'Brien 2 (78', 80'+3'); Cards: Toby Quaredon (yellow card) 71' to 80'	Team Sheet	Try: Marko Grcic (37'm), Tonci Buzov (73'm), Luca Pertain (80'); Pen: Nik Jurisic (36')	Referee: (Spain) Igotz Gallestegi

9 November 2013	Netherlands	34–25	Lithuania	Castricumse Rugbyclub, Castricum, Netherlands
	Try: Alexander Barendregt (14'm), Dirk Danen (38'c), Benjamin Blom (40'm), Sep Visser 2 (44'c, 65'm), Leon Koenen (73'm); Con: Leon Koenen 2 Cards: Sep Visser (yellow card) 79' to 80'	Team Sheet	Try: Jonas Mikalcius 2 (8'c, 69'c), Vytaras Bloskys (55'm); Con: Kestutis Marcisauskas 2 Pen: Kestutis Marcisauskas 2 (27', 52'); Cards: Arturas Rachimovas (yellow card) 38' to 48', Gediminas Marcisauskas (yellow card) 65' to 75'	Attendance: 955; Referee: (Poland) Marcin Zeszutek

16 November 2013	Switzerland	20–20	Netherlands	Switzerland
	Try: penalty try (54'); Jake Serex (80'); Con: Simon Perrod (55'); Julien Gros (80'); Pen: Simon Perrod 2 (19', 64'); Cards: Thibault Gery (yellow card) 38' to 48'; Arnaud Ramey (yellow card) 39' to 49'	Report	Try: Benjamin Blom (11'); Bart Viguurs 2 (40', 66'); Con: Storm Carroll (12'); Pen: Storm Carroll (80'); Cards: Vincent Grimbergen (yellow card) 52' to 62'; Barry Roijen (yellow card) 77' to 80'	Attendance: 1453; Referee: (Czech Republic) Stepan Cekal

5 April 2014	Malta	10–33	Netherlands	Hibernians Ground, Paola, Malta
	Try: Mark Davey (17'm), Daniel Apsee (41'm)	Team Sheet	Try: Bart Viguurs (6'c), Andy Darlington (23'c), Huey Van Vliet (30'c), Vincent Grimbergen (54'm), Norbeccio Mambo (78' c); Con: Norbeccio Mambo 4	Attendance: 2,500; Referee: (Spain) Jorge Molpeceres

12 April 2014	Netherlands	45–13	Croatia	National Rugby Centre, Amsterdam, Netherlands
	Try: Bart Viguurs (7'm), Rik Roovers (18'c), Vincent Grimbergen (54'm), Nicky Verhoeven (57'c), Dirk Danen (67'c), Bart-Jan Romijn (70'c), Huey Van Vliet (77'c); Con: Leon Koenen 5 Cards: Andy Darlington (yellow card) 47' to 57'	Team Sheet	Try: Marko Grcic (75'c); Con: Jai Ayoub; Pen: Jai Ayoub 2 (15', 45'); Cards: Buzov Tonci (yellow card) 66' to 76'	Attendance: 400; Referee: (Italy) Andrea Spadoni

12 April 2014	Switzerland	14–29	Malta	Winterthur, Switzerland
	Try: Nicolas Dimitri (49'm); Pen: Simon Perrod 3 (8', 24', 33'); Cards: Benjamin Schaerer (yellow card) 29' to 39', Benoit Camps (yellow card) 73' to 80'	Team Sheet	Try: Daniel Apsee (78'c), James Morris (80'+5'c); Con: Dominic Busutill 2 Pen: Dominic Busutill 5 (13', 25', 30', 56', 80'+2'); Cards: Rhodri Apsee (yellow card) 46' to 56'	Attendance: 1,083; Referee: (Netherlands) Gert Visser

19 April 2014	Croatia	25–21	Lithuania	Stadion Kranjčevićeva, Zagreb, Croatia
	Try: Jason Newton (42'c), Nik Jurisic (45'c), Ivan Suta (52'm); Con: Jai Ayoub 2 Pen: Jai Ayoub 2 (4', 61')	Team Sheet	Try: Arturas Rachimovas (24'm), Karolis Navickas (65'm), Mindaugas Misevicius (79'm); Pen: Donatas Vilimavicius (40'), Evaldas Stitilis (47')	Attendance: 2,000; Referee: (Czech Republic) Tuma Tomas

26 April 2014	Lithuania	24–18	Switzerland	Šiauliai, Lithuania
	Try: Ignas Darkintis (5'm), Evaldas Stitilis (12'c), Jonas Mikalcius (29'm), Mindaugas Norvaisas (76'c); Con: Donatas Vilimavicius, Dovydas Taujanskas; Cards: Gediminas Marcisauskas (yellow card) 56' to 66'	Team Sheet	Try: Mathieu Paul (2'm), Jonathan Wullchleger 2 (16'm, 41'm); Drop: Sebastien Dimitri (9')	Referee: (Russia) Vladimir Volovik

=== 2012–2014 ===
Promoted to Division 1B for 2014–16 ENC
Playoff to remain Division 2A in 2014–16
Relegated to Division 2B for 2014–16 ENC

Place	Nation	Games				Points			Bonus points	Table points
Place	Nation	played	won	drawn	lost	for	against	difference	Bonus points	Table points
1	Netherlands (47)	8	7	1	0	257	125	+132	5	35
2	Switzerland (52)	8	4	1	3	170	159	+11	3	21
3	Malta (45)	8	4	0	4	162	179	−17	2	18
4	Croatia (44)	8	2	0	6	145	221	−76	3	11
5	Lithuania (36)	8	2	0	6	149	199	−50	3	11

Pre tournament rankings in parentheses.

== Division 2B ==
=== 2012–2013 ===
Table

2012–13 Champions & qualified for RWC 15 European Qualifiers Round 2

Place	Nation	Games				Points			Bonus points	Table points
Place	Nation	played	won	drawn	lost	for	against	difference	Bonus points	Table points
1	Israel (56)	4	4	0	0	137	45	+92	3	19
2	Latvia (72)	4	2	0	2	85	82	+3	3	11
3	Denmark (61)	4	1	1	2	62	79	−17	1	7
4	Andorra (62)	4	1	1	2	48	77	−29	0	6
5	Serbia (73)	4	1	0	3	84	133	−49	2	6

Numbers in parentheses are pre-tournament rankings.
Games

13 October 2012	Denmark	6–6	Andorra	Odense Atletikstadion, Odense, Denmark
	Pen: Joshua Jensen (4'), Andrew Grantham (49'); Cards: Gaspard Nau Valbak (yellow card) 72' to 80'	Report	Pen: Roger Fité 2 (7', 40+5')	Attendance: 500; Referee: (Netherlands) Mike Hoyer

13 October 2012	Israel	48–22	Serbia	Wingate Institute, Netanya, Israel
	Try: Ronan Tollman (3'), Michael Eli (19'), Martan Brosh (30'), Eitan Humphreys (38'), Adrian Rainstein (43'), Nimrod Kaplan 2 (59', 71'), Fabian Maguid (74'); Con: Ronan Tollman 3, Adrian Rainstein; Cards: Mordechy Radashovich (yellow card) 65' to 75'	Report	Try: Ivan Pirkovic (47'), Milan Orlovic (55'), Vitor Ljubicic (78'); Con: Boris Martic 2 Pen: Boris Martic (15'); Cards: Jerko Labus (yellow card) 34' to 44'	Referee: (Germany) Frank Himmer

27 October 2012	Andorra	5–26	Israel	Andorra La Vella, Andorra
	Try: Benjamin Taurinya (32')	Report	Try: Eitan Humphreys 2 (20', 59'), Penalty Try (50'), Matan Brosh (74'); Con: Ronen Tollman 2, Adrian Rainstein; Cards: Nathan Amos (yellow card) 72' to 80'	Referee: (Belgium) Ken Lambrechts

27 October 2012	Serbia	39–21	Latvia	Milicionar Stadium, Belgrade, Serbia
	Try: Marko Kapor 2 (7', 40'+2'), Jerko Labus (25'), Boris Martić (42'), Milan Rastovac (60'), Andrija Janković (68'); Con: Boris Martić 3 Pen: Boris Martić (29'); Cards: Marko Kapor (yellow card) 51' to 61'	Team Sheet	Try: Jānis Skuja (34'), Reinis Pepa (47'), Māris Streikisš (80'); Con: Valters Raņķis, Mihails Tunins 2 Cards: Reinis Pepa (yellow card) 51' to 61'	Referee: (Ukraine) Poplavski

3 November 2012	Latvia	27–15	Denmark	Daugava Stadium, Riga, Latvia
	Try: Janis Skuja (15'), Nauris Bērzinš (40'+4'), Matīss Zalcmanis (47'), Māris Streikišs (63'); Con: Mihail Tumins 2 Pen: Mihail Tumins (6')	Team Sheet	Try: Oliver Leroux (36'), Christian Mellgaard (79'); Con: Joshua Jensen; Pen: Andrew Grantham (57')	Referee: (Georgia (country)) Ucha Narimanidze

3 November 2012	Serbia	23–26	Andorra	Police Sport & Recreation Centre, Belgrade Serbia
	Try: Marko Kapor (26'), Miladin Živanov (51'); Con: Boris Martić 2 Pen: Marko Kapor (15'), Boris Martić 2 (34', 56')	Team Sheet	Try: Albert Canturri (61'); Pen: Marc Abello 6 (8', 18', 23', 31', 55', 78'); Drop: Esteve Dolsa (48')	Referee: (Poland) Grzegorz Michalik

30 March 2013	Andorra	11–22	Latvia	Camp d'Esports del M.I. Consell General, Andorra la Vella, Andorra
	Try: Cristian Garcia (43'); Pen: Cristian Pons 2 (20', 64')	Team Sheet	Try: Borisons Andrejs 2 (10', 50'), Halckis Vitalijs (47'), Zalcmanis Matiss (73'); Con: Halckis Vitalijs; Cards: Provizors Martins (yellow card) 35' to 45', Robezniek Maris (yellow card) 61' to 71'	Attendance: 450; Referee: (Croatia) Hrvoje Bartolic

6 April 2013	Israel	17–15	Latvia	Wingate Institute, Netanya, Israel
	Try: Mordechai Radashkovich (7'), Jonathan Radashkovich (15'), Michael Eli (23'); Con: Eitan Humphreys	Team Sheet	Try: Zagorskis Davis 2 (39', 66'); Con: Zagorskis Davis; Pen: Haleckis Vitalijs (3'); Cards: Provizors Martins (yellow card) 74' to 80'	Referee: (Croatia) Mario Jelavic

13 April 2013	Denmark	38–0	Serbia	Odense, Denmark
	Try: Joshua Jensen (10'), Andreas Robertson (17'), Gaspard Valbak (55'), Andy Nielsen (75'), Oliver Le Roux (80'); Con: Andrew Grantham 5 Pen: Andrew Grantham (46'); Cards: Kasper Pedersen (yellow card) 40' to 50'	Team Sheet	Cards: Branislav Petrovic (yellow card) 79' to 80'	Attendance: 300; Referee: (Finland) George Mossford

20 April 2013	Israel	46–3	Denmark	Wingate Institute, Netanya, Israel
	Try: Jonathan Radashkovich (20'), Mordechai Radashkovich (35'), Eitan Humphreys (40'), Matan Brosh (42'), Jonathan Shaki (46'), Yonatan Kaplan (68'), Guy Matisis (78'); Con: Vitalii Pryimak 4 Pen: Vitalii Pryimak (12'); Cards: Stan Gurtovoy (yellow card) 80' to 80'	Team Sheet	Pen: Andrew Grantham (27'); Cards: Jonas Harreskov (yellow card) 75' to 80'	Attendance: 1,000; Referee: (Czech Republic) Tomas Tuma

=== 2013–14 ===
Table

2013–14 Champions

Place	Nation	Games					Points			Table points
Place	Nation	played	won	drawn	lost	Bonus	for	against	difference	Table points
1	Latvia	4	3	0	1	3	89	67	+22	15
2	Israel	4	3	0	1	2	75	64	+11	14
3	Andorra	4	3	0	1	2	83	63	+20	14
4	Denmark	4	1	0	3	3	66	72	−6	7
5	Serbia	4	0	0	4	0	52	99	−47	0

Games

12 October 2013	Latvia	25–14	Serbia	Valmiera, Latvia
	Try: Arvis Pilenieks (18', 39'); Mareks Larionovs (63'); Kristaps Bērziņš (77'); Con: Kristaps Bērziņš (77'); Pen: Kristaps Bērziņš (14'); Cards: Arvis Pilenieks (yellow card) 56' to 66'	Report	Try: Vlado Kusic (53'); Vitor Ljubicic (56'); Con: Milan Orlovic (54', 56'); Cards: Aleksandar Madjanovic (yellow card) 56' to 66'	Attendance: 173; Referee: (Russia) Vladimir Volovik

19 October 2013	Serbia	6–18	Israel	Serbia
	Pen: Milan Orlović (14', 28')	Report	Try: Jonathan Radahkovich (25'); Adam Rozenberg (59'); Guy Dotan (77'); Pen: Vitali Pryimak (3')	Attendance: 450; Referee: (Malta) Lionel Da Silva

26 October 2013	Latvia	19–22	Andorra	Riga, Latvia
	Try: Edgars Cirulis (52'); Kristaps Berzins (62'); Pen: Kristaps Berzins (8', 24', 60'); Cards: Viktors Silvoniks (yellow card) 31' to 41'	Report	Try: Roger Fite (43'); Con: Marc Abello (43'); Pen: Marc Abello (6', 10', 68', 77'); Drop: Marc Abello (33')	Attendance: 300; Referee: (Netherlands) Gerd Visser

2 November 2013	Denmark	13–15	Israel	Denmark
	Try: 1 Con: 1 Pen: 2		Try: 2 Con: 1 Pen: 1

23 November 2013	Andorra	22–11	Denmark	Andorra la Vella, Andorra
	Try: 3 Con: 2 Pen: 1		Try: 1 Pen: 2

29 March 2014	Andorra	23–13	Serbia	Andorra la Vella, Andorra
	Try: 4 Pen: 1	Report	Try: 1 Con: 2 Pen: 2

12 April 2014	Israel	20–16	Andorra	Netanya, Israel
	Try: 3 Con: 1 Pen: 1	Report	Try: 1 Con: 1 Pen: 3

12 April 2014	Serbia	19–33	Denmark	Belgrade, Serbia
	Try: 3 Con: 2	Report	Try: 4 Con: 2 Pen: 3

26 April 2014	Latvia	29–22	Israel	Riga, Latvia
	Try: 5 Con: 2 Pen: 0 Drop: 0 Cards: 0	http://www.fira-aer-rugby.com/upload/file/1398520727_140426%20ENC2B%20LV%20IL%20Game%20sheet.PDF	Try: 4 Con: 1 Pen: 0 Drop: 0 Cards: 0	Attendance: ~400; Referee: Pikhovkin

3 May 2014	Denmark	9–16	Latvia	Odense, Denmark

=== 2012–2014 ===
Promoted to Division 2A for 2014–16 ENC
Playoff for promotion to Division 2A in 2014–16
Playoff to remain Division 2B in 2014–16
Relegated to Division 2C for 2014–16 ENC

Place	Nation	Games				Points			Bonus points	Table points
Place	Nation	played	won	drawn	lost	for	against	difference	Bonus points	Table points
1	Israel (56)	8	7	0	1	212	109	+103	5	33
2	Latvia (72)	8	5	0	3	174	149	+25	6	26
3	Andorra (62)	8	4	1	3	131	140	−9	2	20
4	Denmark (61)	8	2	1	5	128	151	−23	3	14
5	Serbia (73)	8	1	0	7	136	232	−96	2	6

Numbers in parentheses are pre-tournament rankings.

== Division 2C ==
=== 2012–2013 ===
Table

2012–13 Champions

Place	Nation	Games					Points			Table points
Place	Nation	played	won	drawn	lost	Bonus	for	against	difference	Table points
1	Cyprus (NR)	4	4	0	0	3	198	53	+145	19
2	Slovenia (81)	4	2	0	2	2	52	96	−44	10
3	Hungary (85)	4	2	0	2	2	61	57	+4	10
4	Bulgaria (79)	4	2	0	2	1	65	128	−63	9
5	Austria (84)	4	0	0	4	3	57	99	−42	3

Pre tournament rankings in parentheses. NR=no ranking

Games

6 October 2012	Hungary	28–23	Bulgaria	Széktói Stadion, Kecskemét, Hungary
	Try: Achilles Gyurcsik (3'), Mate Toth (19'), Attila Refi (40'); Con: Szabolis Nagyhegyesi 2 Pen: Szabolis Nagyhegyesi 2 (73', 79'); Drop: Gareth Lloyd (32')	Report	Try: Petar Nikolov (28'), Ivailo Ivanov (46'); Con: Aleks Minchev, Petar Nikolov; Pen: Aleks Minchev 3 (12', 23', 39')	Referee: (France) Jean-Luc Rebollal

20 October 2012	Bulgaria	12–7	Austria	Vasil Levski National Sports Academy, Sofia, Bulgaria
	Try: Ivailo Ivanov 2 (43', 53'); Con: Aleks Minchev; Cards: Teodor Bogdanov (yellow card) 48' to 58'	Report	Try: Lukas Kolb (32'); Con: Maximilian Nevas; Cards: Julian Zochling (yellow card) 39' to 49'	Referee: (Georgia (country)) Gia Amirkhanashvili

27 October 2012	Slovenia	8–7	Hungary	Ljubljana, Slovenia
	Try: Damjan Jovič (29'); Pen: Dali Suljič (57'); Cards: Grega Miljuš (yellow card) 30' to 40', Blaž Pilko (yellow card) 76' to 80'	Team Sheet	Try: Gregő Bán (49'); Con: Gregoise Collet; Cards: Zoltán Heckel (yellow card) 58' to 68'	Attendance: 400; Referee: (Greece) George Kaloxilos

17 November 2012	Austria	20–54	Cyprus	Stadion Hohe Warte, Vienna, Austria
	Try: Constantin Vana (12'), Manuel Polak (33'), Julian Zoechling (69'); Con: Maximilian Navas; Pen: Maximilian Navas (27')	Team Sheet	Try: Christoforo Thoma (6'), Georgios Agathocleous (19'), Marcus Holden (25'), Fidias Efthymiou (29'), Tom Loizidis (36'), Penalty Try (50'), Burhan Torgut (72'); Con: Marcus Holden 5 Pen: Marcus Holden 3 (15', 46', 55')	Referee: (Latvia) Karlis Sarkans

8 December 2012	Cyprus	49–8	Slovenia	Paphos, Cyprus
	Try: Jack Bilton 2 (5', 41'), Matthew King 2 (8', 17'), Thomas Loizidis (35'), Antonis Thoma (56'), Andrew Binikos (61'), Marko Mladenovic (72'); Con: Jack Bilton 3 Pen: Jack Bilton (32'); Cards: Matthew King (yellow card) 24' to 34', Costas Pavlou (yellow card) 78' to 80'	Team Sheet	Try: Dragen Jovanovič (26'); Pen: Dali Suljič (80'); Cards: David Horvat (yellow card) 27' to 37', Žarko Krsmanovič (yellow card) 30' to 40'	Attendance: 500; Referee: (Malta) Lionel Da Silva

16 March 2013	Cyprus	79–10	Bulgaria	Pathon Stadium, Cyprus
	Try: Reno Ioannides 4 (6', 23', 33', 78'), Tom Loizides 2 (19', 31'), Burhan Torgut (21'), Fidias Efthymiou 3 (39', 59', 70'), Marcus Holden (41'), Andrew Binikos (55'); Con: Marcus Holden 8 Pen: Marcus Holden (9'); Cards: Giorgios Agathokleous (yellow card) 50' to 60'	Team Sheet	Try: Martin Stoyanov (51'); Con: Martin Stoyanov; Pen: Martin Stoyanov (3'); Cards: Radoslav Damyanov (yellow card) 75' to 80'	Attendance: 500; Referee: (Luxembourg) Didier Welfring

- This was the 18th consecutive Test match win for Cyprus, a new world record. The previous record of 17 was held jointly by New Zealand, South Africa, and Lithuania. (Although International Rugby Board records credit Lithuania with 18 consecutive wins from 2006 to 2010, ESPN Scrum pointed out that this streak should be reduced by one, as this 18-match sequence in fact included one loss.)

6 April 2013	Austria	10–11	Hungary	Dirnelwiese, Vienna, Austria
	Try: Milad Farkhondeh-Fal (30' c); Con: Maximilian Navas (30'); Pen: Maximilian Navas (52')		Try: Gregoire Collet (73'); Pen: Gregoire Collet 2 (36', 55'); Cards: Andre Brand (yellow card) 21' to 31', Gareth Lloyd (yellow card) 25' to 35'	Attendance: 500; Referee: (Czech Republic) Stepan Cekal

6 April 2013	Bulgaria	20–14	Slovenia	Stadium N.S.A., Sofia, Bulgaria
	Try: Antonio Ivanov (2'); Con: 0 Pen: Smilko Debrenliev 5 (15', 30', 40+3', 48', 80+4'); Drop: 0 Cards: Dragomir Radin (yellow card) 62' to 72'		Try: Anže Troppan (6' c), David Horvat (46' c); Con: Enej Radelj Šemrov (6'), Jaka Sajevic (46')	Attendance: 500; Referee: (Ukraine) S. Poplavski

20 April 2013	Hungary	15–16	Cyprus	Esztergom, Hungary
	Pen: Gregoire Collet 5 (2', 29', 49', 59', 72')		Try: Luke Frixou (24' c); Con: Marcus Holden (24'); Pen: Marcus Holden 3 (17', 21', 53')	Attendance: 300; Referee: (Serbia) Dejan Stiglic

20 April 2013	Slovenia	22–20	Austria	Oval Stadium, Ljubljana, Slovenia
	Try: Iztok Javornik (18'), Tit Hočevar 2 (43', 47' c), David Horvat (76'); Con: Enej Radelj Šemrov (48'); Cards: Damjan Jovič (yellow card) 29' to 39'		Try: Johannes Dachler (4' c), Milad Farkondeh-Fal (37' c); Con: Maximilian Navas 2 (5', 37'); Pen: Maximilian Navas 2 (15', 54'); Cards: Maximilian Müller (yellow card) 74' to end'	Referee: (Spain) Inigo Atorrasagasti

=== 2013–14 ===
Table

2013–14 Champions

Place	Nation	Games					Points			Table points
Place	Nation	played	won	drawn	lost	Bonus	for	against	difference	Table points
1	Cyprus	4	4	0	0	3	148	39	+109	19
2	Hungary	4	3	0	1	2	138	66	+72	14
3	Austria	4	2	0	2	1	98	67	+31	9
4	Slovenia	4	1	0	3	1	57	106	−49	5
5	Bulgaria	4	0	0	4	0	51	214	−163	0

Games

5 October 2013	Bulgaria	5–67	Hungary	Sofia, Bulgaria
	Try: Martin Todorov (79')	Report	Try: Daniel Toth (9', 11', 70'), Gyorgy Komuves (16', 39', 55'), Szilard Jung (23'), David Darquier (33', 43'), Jonathan Katona (82'); Con: Gregoire Collet (10', 12', 23', 34', 70', 83'), Szabolcs Nagyhegyesi (65'); Pen: Gregoire Collet (2')	Referee: (Croatia) Marijo Jelavic

19 October 2013	Austria	58–14	Bulgaria	Austria
	Try: 7 Con: 4 Pen: 5		Try: 1 Pen: 3

26 October 2013	Hungary	35–3	Slovenia	Hungary
	Try: Nicolas Valoo (13'); Ducrocq Thomas (64'); Zoltán Máthé (75'); Attilla Prakter (80'); Con: Gregoire Collet (14', 76', 80'); Pen: Gregoire Collet (2', 27', 52'); Cards: Ducrocq Thomas (yellow card) 50' to 60'		Pen: Pavel Žle (50')	Attendance: 600; Referee: (Ukraine) Sergei Poplavskyi

9 November 2013	Slovenia	3–34	Cyprus	Slovenia

30 November 2013	Cyprus	22–8	Austria	Cyprus
	Try: 3 Con: 2 Pen: 1		Try: 1 Pen: 1

12 April 2014	Hungary	23–12	Austria	Hungary
	Try: 2 Con: 2 Pen: 3	Report	Try: 2 Con: 1

12 April 2014	Slovenia	43–17	Bulgaria	Ljubljana, Slovenia
	Try: 7 Con: 4	Report	Try: 3 Con: 1

26 April 2014	Bulgaria	15–46	Cyprus	Sofia, Bulgaria
	Try: 2 Con: 1 Pen: 1 Drop: 0 Cards: 0	http://www.fira-aer-rugby.com/upload/file/1398525843_140426%20ENC2C%20BG%20CY%20Game%20sheet.PDF	Try: 8 Con: 3 Pen: 0 Drop: 0 Cards: 0	Referee: Poplavskyi

3 May 2014	Austria	20–8	Slovenia	Austria

17 May 2014	Cyprus	46–13	Hungary	Cyprus

=== 2012–2014 ===
Promoted to Division 2B for 2014–16 ENC
Playoff for promotion to Division 2B in 2014–16
Playoff to remain Division 2C in 2014–16
Relegated to Division 2D for 2014–16 ENC

Place	Nation	Games					Points			Table points
Place	Nation	played	won	drawn	lost	Bonus	for	against	difference	Table points
1	Cyprus (NR)	8	8	0	0	6	346	92	+254	38
2	Hungary (85)	8	5	0	3	4	176	111	+65	24
3	Slovenia (81)	8	3	0	5	3	109	194	−93	15
4	Austria (84)	8	2	0	6	4	143	143	0	12
5	Bulgaria (79)	8	2	0	6	1	116	342	−169	9

Pre tournament rankings in parentheses. NR=no ranking

== Division 2D ==
=== 2012–2013 ===
Table

2012–13 Champions & qualified for RWC 15 European Qualifiers Round 1

Place	Nation	Games				Points			Bonus points	Table points
Place	Nation	played	won	drawn	lost	for	against	difference	Bonus points	Table points
1	Luxembourg (95)	4	3	0	1	74	62	+12	0	12
2	Norway (93)	4	2	0	2	65	48	+17	3	11
3	Bosnia and Herzegovina (87)	4	2	0	2	78	71	+7	2	10
4	Greece (NR)	4	2	0	2	61	64	−3	1	9
5	Finland (96)	4	1	0	3	45	78	−33	2	6

Pre-tournament rankings in parentheses. NR=No ranking
Games

6 October 2012	Finland	14–16	Luxembourg	Myllypuro Sports Park, Helsinki, Finland
	Try: Mikko Luopio (56'), Andras Devenyi (76'); Con: Mikko Luopio, Antti Cammi	IRB Team List; Report	Try: Philippe Vimond (49'); Con: Yared Ketema; Pen: Yared Ketema 2 (26', 46'), James Harris (40'); Cards: Jason Limpach (yellow card) 28' to 38'	Referee: (Denmark) Michael Vestorp

20 October 2012	Norway	32–3	Finland	Bislett Stadion, Oslo, Norway
	Try: Alex Deissner 2 (21', 42'), Finn James Gormley (38'), Thierry Davy (59'), James Buncle (79'); Con: Kristoffer Borsheim 2 Pen: Kristoffer Borsheim (25')	Report	Pen: Antti Lammi (13')	Referee: (Poland) Kacper Michalkiewicz

3 November 2012	Norway	11–9	Bosnia and Herzegovina	Fana Stadion, Bergen, Norway
	Try: Kim-Robin Petterson (66'); Pen: Kristoffer Borsheim 2 (59', 80'+2')	Team Sheet	Pen: Armin Vehabovic 2 (33', 44'); Drop: Armin Vehabovic (15')	Referee: (Lithuania) Ramonas Grumbinas

10 November 2012	Luxembourg	15–8	Norway	Stade Josy Barthel, Luxembourg, Luxembourg
	Try: Adrien Timmermans (38'), Philippe Vimond (52'), Vincent Giffard (63')	IRB Team List; Team Sheet	Try: Kristoffer Borsheim (71'); Pen: Kristoffer Borsheim (60')	Attendance: 700; Referee: (Switzerland) Christophe Secat

17 November 2012	Greece	22–17	Bosnia and Herzegovina	Kavtantzoglio Stadium, Thessaloniki, Greece
	Try: Platon Moysiadis (40'); Con: Platon Moysiadis; Pen: Quram Kizikurashrili 4 (2', 20', 23', 66'), Konstantino Meidinger (75')	Team Sheet	Try: Senad Turčinović 2 (5', 55'), Sabahudin Subašić (35'); Con: Sabahudin Subašić; Cards: Senad Turčinović (yellow card) 61' to 71'	Referee: (Portugal) Afonso Nogueira

30 March 2013	Greece	11–13	Finland	Dasos Haidariou Municipal Stadium, Athens, Greece
	Try: Quram Kizikurashrili (13'); Pen: Quram Kizikurashrili 2 (55', 71'); Cards: Grigol Chatzis (yellow card) 49' to 59'	Team Sheet	Try: Lasse Sariola (27'), Joakim Grader (38'); Pen: Jussi Viljanen (48')	Attendance: 300; Referee: (Hungary) Csaba Priskin

13 April 2013	Bosnia and Herzegovina	33–23	Luxembourg	Stadion Tosk, Tešanj, Bosnia and Herzegovina
	Try: Armin Vehabović 2 (32', 39'), Selmir Glavaš (68'); Con: Armin Vehabović 3 Pen: Armin Vehabović 4 (9', 21', 40', 55'); Cards: Armin Zadić (yellow card) 24' to 34'	Team Sheet	Try: Stuart Logier (29'), Yarad Ketema (52'), Matthew Hopwood (80'); Con: Bertrand Cohen-Sabban; Pen: Bertrand Cohen-Sabban (10'), Ciaran Keane (65')	Attendance: 800; Referee: (Italy) Alan Falzone

13 April 2013	Greece	21–14	Norway	Athens, Greece
	Try: Givi Gorgisheli (30'), Quram Kizikurashrili (47'); Con: Quram Kizikurashrili; Pen: Quram Kizikurashrili 3 (15', 68', 76'); Cards: Grigol Chatzis (yellow card) 19' to 29', Veniamin Davidis (yellow card) 39' to 49'	Team Sheet	Try: Andre Ellingsen Slaata (70'); Pen: Finn Gormley 3 (27', 44', 53'); Cards: Finn Gormley (yellow card) 67' to 77'	Attendance: 100; Referee: (Israel) Ariel Cabral

20 April 2013	Luxembourg	20–7	Greece	Luxembourg, Luxembourg
	Try: Jan Louw (31'), Adrien Timmermans (48'); Con: Ciaran Keane 2 Pen: Ciaran Keane (39'), Yarad Ketema (80'); Cards: Tertius Barnard (yellow card) 60' to 70'	Team Sheet	Try: Filippos Sotiriadis (65'); Con: Vasileios Katsakos; Cards: Georgios-Anastasios Dimitriadis (yellow card) 54' to 64'	Attendance: 500; Referee: (Germany) Christian Doering

20 April 2013	Bosnia and Herzegovina	19–15	Finland	Zenica, Bosnia and Herzegovina
	Try: Edin Pojskić (32'); Con: Armin Vehabović; Pen: Armin Vehabović 2 (12', 50'); Drop: Sabahudi Subašić (46'), Semir Pašić (47')	Team Sheet	Try: Crispin Maenpaa 2 (15', 58'), Kalle Salminen (49')	Referee: (Portugal) Paulo Duarte

=== 2013–14 ===
Table

2013–14 Champions

Place	Nation	Games					Points			Table points
Place	Nation	played	won	drawn	lost	Bonus	for	against	difference	Table points
1	Luxembourg	4	3	0	1	1	100	46	+54	13
2	Bosnia and Herzegovina	4	2	0	2	3	109	61	+48	11
3	Norway	4	2	0	2	2	76	87	−11	10
4	Finland	4	2	0	2	2	83	96	−13	10
5	Greece	4	1	0	3	0	71	149	−78	4

Games

28 September 2013	Finland	35–20	Greece	Paavo Nurmi Stadium, Turku
	Try: Aaro Katainen (6', 70'), Crispin Mäenpää (16'), Ilkka Tuomaala (42'), Dawid van de Walt (57'); Con: Andrew Myrie (6', 58'); Pen: Andrew Myrie (3', 67')	Report	Try: Pliatsikas Stephen Peter (19'), Grigorios Bourgos (48'); Con: Leo Huisman (20', 49'); Pen: Leo Huisman (22'); Drop: George Dennis Gargoulakis (35'); Cards: Christos Fiotakis (yellow card) 54' to 64', Konstantinos Meidinger (yellow card) 78' to 80'	Attendance: 400; Referee: (Denmark) Michael Vestorp

12 October 2013	Finland	12–24	Norway	Finland

12 October 2013	Bosnia and Herzegovina	17–20	Greece	Zenica, Bosnia and Herzegovina

19 October 2013	Norway	7–9	Luxembourg	Norway
	Try: 1 Con: 1		Pen: 3

9 November 2013	Luxembourg	12–24	Bosnia and Herzegovina	Stade Josy Barthel, Luxembourg, Luxembourg
	Try: 2 Con: 1		Try: 2 Con: 1 Pen: 3 Drop: 1 Cards: (yellow card) 64' to 74'

19 April 2014	Bosnia and Herzegovina	43–0	Norway	Bosnia and Herzegovina

26 April 2014	Greece	8–52	Luxembourg	Greece

10 May 2014	Norway	45–23	Greece	Stavanger, Norway

10 May 2014	Luxembourg	27–7	Finland	Stade Josy Barthel, Luxembourg, Luxembourg

31 May 2014	Finland	29–25	Bosnia and Herzegovina	Finland

=== 2012–2014 ===
Promoted to Division 2C for 2014–16 ENC
Playoff for promotion to Division 2C in 2014–16
Relegated to Division 3A for 2014–16 ENC

Place	Nation	Games				Points			Bonus points	Table points
Place	Nation	played	won	drawn	lost	for	against	difference	Bonus points	Table points
1	Luxembourg (95)	8	6	0	2	174	108	+66	1	25
2	Bosnia and Herzegovina (87)	8	4	0	4	187	132	+55	5	21
3	Norway (93)	8	4	0	4	141	135	+6	5	21
4	Finland (96)	8	3	0	5	128	174	−46	4	16
5	Greece (NR)	8	3	0	5	132	213	−81	1	13

Pre-tournament rankings in parentheses. NR=No ranking

== Promotion/relegation playoffs ==
=== Division 2A-Division 2B ===
Division 2B's 2nd placed Latvia hosted Division 2A's 4th placed Croatia. Croatia won and retained their place in the ENC Division 2A for 2014–2016, while Latvia will play in the ENC Division 2B.

21 June 2014	(62) Latvia	10–16	Croatia (55)	University of Latvia, Riga, Latvia
	Try: Matiss Zalcmanis (29'c); Con: Kristaps Berzins; Pen: Kristaps Berzins (16'); Cards: Uldis Saulite (yellow card) 41' to 51'	Team Sheet	Try: Jason Newton (66'c); Con: Jason Newton; Pen: Jason Newton 3 (8', 50' 53')	Attendance: 250; Referee: (Russia) Alexey Bryzgalin

=== Division 2B-Division 2C ===
Division 2C's 2nd placed Hungary were due to host Division 2B's 4th placed Denmark. However, Denmark chose not to play the match, and therefore Hungary were promoted to Division 2B for 2014–16, while Denmark was relegated to Division 2C.

=== Division 2C-Division 2D ===
Division 2D's 2nd placed Bosnia and Herzegovina hosted Division 2C's 4th placed Austria. Austria won and retained their place in the ENC Division 2C for 2014–2016, while Bosnia and Herzegovina will remain in the ENC Division 2D.

7 June 2014	(91) Bosnia and Herzegovina	12–26	Austria (83)	Tešanj, Bosnia and Herzegovina
	Try: Dženan Durgut 2 (15', 65'c); Con: Sabahudin Subašić; Cards: Armin Zadić (yellow card) 38' to 48'	Team Sheet	Try: Stephan Reiseneder (36'c), Philip Waidmann (40'+2'c); Con: Maximilian Nevas 2 Pen: Maximilian Nevas 4 (5', 10', 32', 50')	Attendance: 450; Referee: (Portugal) Afonso Nogueira

Pre-game rankings in parentheses
