= 2013 Asian Five Nations division tournaments =

- Date: 31 March 2013 – 7 July 2013
- Countries: (18) Refer to division

Tournament statistics
- Matches played: 20
- Official website: Website

For main Top 5 Division, see: 2013 Asian Five Nations

The 2013 Asian Five Nations division tournaments, known as the 2013 HSBC Asian 5 Nations due to the tournament's sponsorship by the HSBC, referred to the divisions played within the tournament. This was the 6th series of the Asian Five Nations.

== Changes from 2012 ==
- Kazakhstan participated in the Division 1 tournament, haven been relegated from the Top 5.
- Philippines was promoted to the Top 5 Division, following promotions form Division 3 to Division 2, then Division 2 to Division 1.
- Thailand have replaced Singapore in Division 1, with Singapore competing in Division 2.
- India will compete in Division 2 - replacing China, following promotion from Division 3.
- Qatar becomes the first team to be promoted out of Division 4, replacing Pakistan who are demoted to Division 4.
- Laos becomes the first team to be promoted out of Division 5, though no team was demoted out of Division 4.

== Teams ==
The teams involved, with their world rankings pre tournament, were:

Division 1

- Chinese Taipei (60)
- Kazakhstan (35)
- Sri Lanka (47)
- Thailand (59)

Division 2

- India (67)
- Iran (NA)
- Malaysia (64)
- Singapore (66)

Division 3

- China (68)
- Guam (87)
- India (NA)
- Qatar (NA)

Division 4

- Laos (NA)
- Lebanon (NA)
- Pakistan (79)
- Uzbekistan (NA)

Division 5

- Brunei (NA)
- Cambodia (NA)

== Division 1 ==
Key to colours
Earns Promotion
Relegated

2013 Asian Five Nations division 1
Tournament details
- Host: Sri Lanka
- Date: 31 March – 6 April 2013
- Countries: 4

Final positions
- Champions: Sri Lanka
- Relegated: Thailand

Tournament statistics
- Matches played: 6

Division one will be held in a round-robin format. All games will be played at Havelock Park in Sri Lanka between March 31 and April 6, 2013.

=== Table ===
Position	Nation	Games				Points			Bonus points	Total points
Position	Nation	Played	Won	Lost	Drawn	For	Against	Difference	Bonus points	Total points
1	Sri Lanka	3	3	0	0	133	33	+100	3	18
2	Kazakhstan	3	1	2	0	70	92	-22	1	6
3	Chinese Taipei	3	1	2	0	70	104	-34	6	6
4	Thailand	3	1	2	0	63	107	-44	0	5

Points are awarded to the teams as follows:

Results	Points
Win	5 points
Draw	3 points
4 or more tries	1 point
Loss within 7 points	1 point
Loss greater than 7 points	0 points

=== Fixtures ===
31 March 2013
14:00

Kazakhstan	10–33	Thailand
	Report	Try: Sirichai Daothaisong, Topong Boonlon, Pichit Yingcharoen; Con: Warongkorn Khamkoet 3 Pen: Warongkorn Khamkoet 4

Havelock Park, Colombo

31 March 2013
16:00

Sri Lanka	39–8	Chinese Taipei
Try: Chamara Dabare 42'; Yoshitha Rajapakse 50'; Fazil Marija 55' 61'; Sumedha Malawana 66'; Con: Rizah Mubarak (3/4); Roshan Weeraratne (1/1); Pen: Rizah Mubarak 24' 34'	Report	Try: Ming Che Chuang 76'; Pen: Chih-Pan Wang 42'

Havelock Park, Colombo
Attendance: 4,800
Referee: (Hong Kong) Nicholas Long

FB	15	Rizah Mubarak	(substituted off) 64'
RW	14	Sandun Herath
OC	13	Pradeep Liyanage
IC	12	Gayan Weerarathne	(substituted off) 57'
LW	11	Chamara Dabare
FH	10	Fazil Marija (vc)
SH	9	Roshan Weerarathne	(substituted off) 69'
N8	8	Sajith Saranga
OF	7	Yoshitha Rajapaksha (c)
BF	6	Sharo Fernando	(substituted off) 63'
RL	5	Dinesh Sanjeewa	(substituted off) 40'
LL	4	Shenal Dias
TP	3	Kishor Jehan	(substituted off) 46'
HK	2	Namal Rajapaksa	(substituted off) 52'
LP	1	Henry Terence
Substitutes:
HK	16	Sathya Ranathunga	(substituted on) 46' (yellow card) 74' to end'
PR	17	Dushmantha Priyadarshana
PR	18	Anuranga Walpola	(substituted on) 52'
LK	19	Suhiru Anthony	(substituted on) 40'
FL	20	Sumedha Malewana	(substituted on) 63'
SH	21	Rehaan Weerakoon	(substituted on) 69'
FH	22	Dinusha Chathuranga	(substituted on) 57'
CE	23	Mohamed Sheriff	(substituted on) 64'
Coach:
(South Africa) Ravin Du Plessis

FB	15	Ming Hsien Ho
RW	14	Chih-Kang Chen
OC	13	Wei Fan Lu (c)	(substituted off) 53'
IC	12	Ching Che Hung
LW	11	Wu Hsien Lo	(substituted off) 63'
FH	10	Chih-Pan Wang	(substituted off) 48'
SH	9	Chia Han Chen	(substituted off) 48'
N8	8	Pin Yi Hsieh
OF	7	Cheng Hsien Chiang
BF	6	Kuo Lun Chen	(substituted off) 53'
RL	5	Chieh Yu Chiang
LL	4	Wei Ming Lin	(substituted off) 28'
TP	3	Wen Hao Chuan	(substituted off) 29'
HK	2	Po Yao Chuang	(substituted off) 63'
LP	1	Tai Ting Yeh
Substitutes:
HK	16	Po Wen Cheng	(substituted on) 29'
PR	17	Min-Ching Chiu	(substituted on) 63'
PR	18	Ming Che Chuang	(substituted on) 28'
LK	19	Ta Cheng Liu	(substituted on) 53'
FL	20	Chia-Wang Lee	(substituted on) 48'
SH	21	Po-Yen Chou	(substituted on) 53'
FH	22	Hsiu Fu Sun	(substituted on) 63'
CE	23	Chih-Hsiang Pan	(substituted on) 48'
Coach:

Touch judges:
(Singapore) Aaron Littlewood
(Sri Lanka) Mohamed Cader
Sean Moore

3 April 2013
14:00

Kazakhstan	42–5	Chinese Taipei
	Report

Havelock Park, Colombo

3 April 2013
16:00

Sri Lanka	45–7	Thailand
Try: Sandun Herath 24' 79'; Pradeep Liyanage 28' 60'; Chamara Dabare 30'; Roshan Weerarathne 44'; Con: Rizah Mubarak (3/6); Pen: Rizah Mubarak 11' 38' 40'	Report	Try: Pichit Yingcharoen 75'; Con: Warongkorn Khamkoet (1/1); Pen: Warongkorn Khamkoet (0/1)

Havelock Park, Colombo
Attendance: 4,800
Referee: (Hong Kong) Warren Needham

FB	15	Rizah Mubarak	(substituted off) 65'
RW	14	Sandun Herath
OC	13	Pradeep Liyanage
IC	12	Gayan Weeraratne	(substituted off) 61'
LW	11	Chamara Dabare
FH	10	Fazil Marija (vc)
SH	9	Roshan Weeraratne	(substituted off) 71'
N8	8	Sajith Saranga	(substituted off) 50'
OF	7	Yoshitha Rajapaksha (c)	(substituted off) 66'
BF	6	Sharo Fernando
RL	5	Hasitha Perera	(substituted off) 50'
LL	4	Shenal Dias
TP	3	Jehan Kishore	(substituted off) 29'
HK	2	Namal Rajapaksa
LP	1	Sathya Ranathunga	(substituted off) 65'
Substitutes:
HK	16	Dushmantha Priyadarshana	(substituted on) 65'
PR	17	Henry Terrance	(substituted on) 29'
PR	18	Anuranga Walpola	(substituted on) 66'
LK	19	Suhiru Anthony	(substituted on) 50'
FL	20	Mohamed Sheriff	(substituted on) 65'
SH	21	Rehan Weerakoon	(substituted on) 71'
FH	22	Dinusha Chathuranga	(substituted on) 61'
CE	23	Sumedha Malawana	(substituted on) 50'
Coach:
(South Africa) Ravin Du Plessis

FB	15	Warongkorn Khamkoet
RW	14	Topong Boonlon	(substituted off) 71'
OC	13	Kitti Wangkanai	(substituted off) 32'
IC	12	Sirichai Daothaisong
LW	11	Pichit Yingcharoen
FH	10	Thanawatr Jamkrajang
SH	9	Punyavee Jiworrawattanakul
N8	8	Chatree Wannadit (c)	(substituted off) 66'
OF	7	Sumet Thammapom
BF	6	Richard Perkins
RL	5	Chaninthorn Banluesup	(substituted off) 50'
LL	4	Marc Dimitrov
TP	3	Pongpat Mekpat	(substituted off) 65'
HK	2	Chawiatt Klongtroujrok	(substituted off) 37'
LP	1	Napat Prompataya
Substitutes:
HK	16	Chatchai Akkhanimart	(substituted on) 65'
PR	17	Robert James	(substituted on) 66'
PR	18	Pachara Hongsayaporn	(substituted on) 50'
LK	19	Natthadol Sophawachirarit	(substituted on) 37'
FL	20	Pramote Ratchatanantakit	(substituted on) 71'
SH	21	Klin Laksanasompong
FH	22	Nirunlert Rungrangsritaweesuk	(substituted on) 32'
CE	23	Khomchak Chakrabandu Na Ayudhaya
Coach:
(Thailand) Tanyavit Kuasint

Touch judges:
(Japan) Taku Otsuki
(Sri Lanka) Priyantha Gunarathna
Sean Moore

6 April 2013
14:00

Thailand	23–52	Chinese Taipei
	Report

Havelock Park, Colombo

6 April 2013
16:00

Sri Lanka	49–18	Kazakhstan
Try: Sandun Herath 4'; Shenal Dias 26'; Pradeep Liyanage 40'; Sathya Ranathunga 41'; Fazil Marija 49'; Chamara Dabare 56'; Con: Rizah Mubarak (5/6); Pen: Rizah Mubarak 7' 20' 38'	Report	Try: Daulet Akymbekov 62'; Alexandr Zolotukhin 69'; Con: Maxim Lifontov (1/2); Pen: Maxim Lifontov 3' 34'

Havelock Park, Colombo
Attendance: 5,300
Referee: (Japan) Taku Otsuki

FB	15	Rizah Mubarak	(substituted off) 70'
RW	14	Sandun Herath
OC	13	Pradeep Liyanage
IC	12	Gayan Weeraratne	(substituted off) 59'
LW	11	Chamara Dabare
FH	10	Fazil Marija (vc)	(substituted off) 75'
SH	9	Roshan Weeraratne
N8	8	Sajith Saranga
OF	7	Yoshitha Rajapaksha (c)
BF	6	Sharo Fernando	(substituted off) 70'
RL	5	Hasitha Perera	(substituted off) 55'
LL	4	Shenal Dias
TP	3	Jehan Kishore	(substituted off) 55'
HK	2	Namal Rajapaksa	(substituted off) 59'
LP	1	Sathya Ranathunga	(substituted off) 75'
Substitutes:
HK	16	Dushmantha Priyadarshana	(substituted on) 75'
PR	17	Henry Terrance	(substituted on) 55'
PR	18	Anuranga Walpola	(substituted on) 59'
LK	19	Suhiru Anthony	(substituted on) 55'
FL	20	Mohamed Sheriff	(substituted on) 70'
SH	21	Rehan Weerakoon	(substituted on) 75'
FH	22	Dinusha Chathuranga	(substituted on) 59'
CE	23	Sumedha Malawana	(substituted on) 70'
Coach:
(South Africa) Ravin Du Plessis

FB	15	Maxim Lifontov
RW	14	Viktor Zolotukhin
OC	13	Alexandr Zaharov	(substituted off) 56'
IC	12	Ildar Abrazakov
LW	11	Pavel Stikhin	(substituted off) 56'
FH	10	Daulet Akymbekov
SH	9	Akhmetzhan Baratov
N8	8	Serek Zhanseitov (c)
OF	7	Maxim Pristinskiy	(substituted off) 40'
BF	6	Oleg Guselnikov
RL	5	Grigoriy Ivanchenko	(substituted off) 4' (substituted on) 12' (substituted off) 62'
LL	4	Andrey Medvedkin
TP	3	Vladimir Chernykh	(substituted off) 59'
HK	2	Pavel Sarychev	(substituted off) 56'
LP	1	Sergey Menshikov
Substitutes:
HK	16	Nikolay Belkin	(substituted on) 56'
PR	17	Azat Abbasov	(substituted on) 59' (yellow card) 65' to 75'
PR	18	Vladimir Baranov	(substituted on) 62'
LK	19	Alexandr Kireev
FL	20	Alexandr Polyakov	(substituted on) 4' (substituted off) 12' (substituted on) 40'
SH	21	Vadim Zuyev
FH	22	Dastan Suleimenov	(substituted on) 56'
CE	23	Alexandr Zolotukhin	(substituted on) 56'
Coach:
(Kazakhstan) Timur Mashurov

Touch judges:
(Japan) Taizo Hirabayashi
(Singapore) Aaron Littlewood
Sean Moore

== Division 2 ==
Key to colours
Earns Promotion
Relegated

2013 Asian Five Nations division 2
Tournament details
- Host: Malaysia
- Date: 4 – 8 June 2013
- Countries: 4

Final positions
- Champions: Singapore
- Relegated: India

Tournament statistics
- Matches played: 4

Semi-finals
June 4, 2013
Singapore	67
India	8
June 4, 2013
Malaysia	48
Iran	10

Final
June 8, 2013
Singapore	20
Malaysia	17
Third place play-off
June 7, 2013
India	13
Iran	30

=== Semi-finals ===
4 June 2013
15:00

Singapore	67–8	India

Petaling Jaya Stadium, Kuala Lumpur

4 June 2013
17:00

Malaysia	48–10	Iran

Petaling Jaya Stadium, Kuala Lumpur

=== Third place play-off ===
7 June 2013
17:00

India	13–30	Iran

Petaling Jaya Stadium, Kuala Lumpur

=== Final ===
8 June 2013
18:00

Malaysia	17–20	Singapore

Petaling Jaya Stadium, Kuala Lumpur

== Division 3 ==
Key to colours
Earns Promotion
Relegated

2013 Asian Five Nations division 3
Tournament details
- Host: Malaysia
- Date: 5 – 8 June 2013
- Countries: 4

Final positions
- Champions: Qatar
- Relegated: China

Tournament statistics
- Matches played: 4

Semi-finals
June 5, 2013
Guam	33
Indonesia	15
June 5, 2013
China	0
Qatar	76

Final
June 8, 2013
Guam	7
Qatar	13
Third place play-off
June 7, 2013
Indonesia	37
China	13

=== Semi-finals ===
5 June 2013
15:00

Guam	33–15	Indonesia

Petaling Jaya Stadium, Kuala Lumpur

5 June 2013
17:00

China	0–76	Qatar

Petaling Jaya Stadium, Kuala Lumpur

=== Third place play-off ===
7 June 2013
15:00

China	13–37	Indonesia

Petaling Jaya Stadium, Kuala Lumpur

=== Final ===
8 June 2013
16:00

Guam	7–13	Qatar

Petaling Jaya Stadium, Kuala Lumpur

== Division 4 ==
Key to colours
Earns Promotion
Relegated

2013 Asian Five Nations division 4
Tournament details
- Host: United Arab Emirates
- Date: 8 – 10 May 2013
- Countries: 4

Final positions
- Champions: Lebanon

Tournament statistics
- Matches played: 4

Semi-finals
May 8, 2013 The Sevens, Dubai
Lebanon	35
Uzbekistan	25
May 8, 2013 The Sevens, Dubai
Pakistan	31
Laos	25

Final
May 10, 2013 The Sevens, Dubai
Lebanon	45
Pakistan	12
Third place play-off
May 10, 2013 The Sevens, Dubai
Uzbekistan	18
Laos	15

=== Semi-finals ===
May 8, 2013
17:00

Lebanon	35–25	Uzbekistan

The Sevens, Dubai

May 8, 2013
19:00

Pakistan	31–25	Laos

The Sevens, Dubai

=== Third place play-off ===
May 10, 2013
17:00

Uzbekistan	18–15	Laos

The Sevens (field 2), Dubai

=== Final ===
May 10, 2013
17:00

Lebanon	45–12	Pakistan

The Sevens, Dubai

== Division 5 ==
Key to colours
Earns Promotion
Relegated

2013 Asian Five Nations division 5
Tournament details
- Host: Cambodia
- Date: 5 – 7 July 2013
- Countries: 2

Final positions
- Champions: Cambodia

Tournament statistics
- Matches played: 2

=== Game 1 ===
July 5, 2013
15:30

Cambodia	38–0	Brunei
	Report

RCAF Old Stadium, Phnom Penh

=== Game 2 ===
July 7, 2013
15:30

Cambodia	28–0	Brunei
	Report

RCAF Old Stadium, Phnom Penh
