= José Rakoto =

Madagascar international rugby union player

- Born: José Rakotoarisoa Harison; December 11, 1980 (age 45)
- Height: 1.80 m (5 ft 11 in)
- Weight: 85 kg (187 lb; 13.4 st)

Rugby union career
- Position(s): Fly-half, Fullback
International career
Years	Team	Apps	(Points)
	Madagascar	58	

José Rakotoarisoa Harison, known as José Rakoto (born 11 December 1980) is a Malagasy rugby union player. He plays as a fly-half and as a fullback.

Harison first played in F.I.T.A.M.I.B.A., from 1997/98 to 1999/2000, moving then to XV Simpatiques, where he would play from 2000/01 to 2002/03. He then would represent 3F.B., one of the best teams of Madagascar, from 2003/04 to 2004/05. He won three National Championship titles during his three-season first presence at 3F.B.. He then had the chance to move to France, playing for a season at Rugby Club Chateaurenard (2005/06), in the Fédérale 1. He returned to 3F.B. for 2006/07, where he's been playing since then. He won the National Championship titles for 2006/07 and 2007/08.

Harison is an international player for Madagascar since 2002. He was twice runners-up for the title of Africa Champions in 2005 and 2007. He played at the winning team at the 2012 Africa Cup, scoring two tries and six conversions at the 57–54 win over Namibia.

He played in the 2007 Rugby World Cup and 2011 Rugby World Cup qualifyings. As of March 2020 he is the top scorer for his National Team.
