= Outline of the Dominican Republic =

Overview of and topical guide to the Dominican Republic

The Flag of the Dominican Republic

The Coat of arms of the Dominican Republic

The location of the Dominican Republic

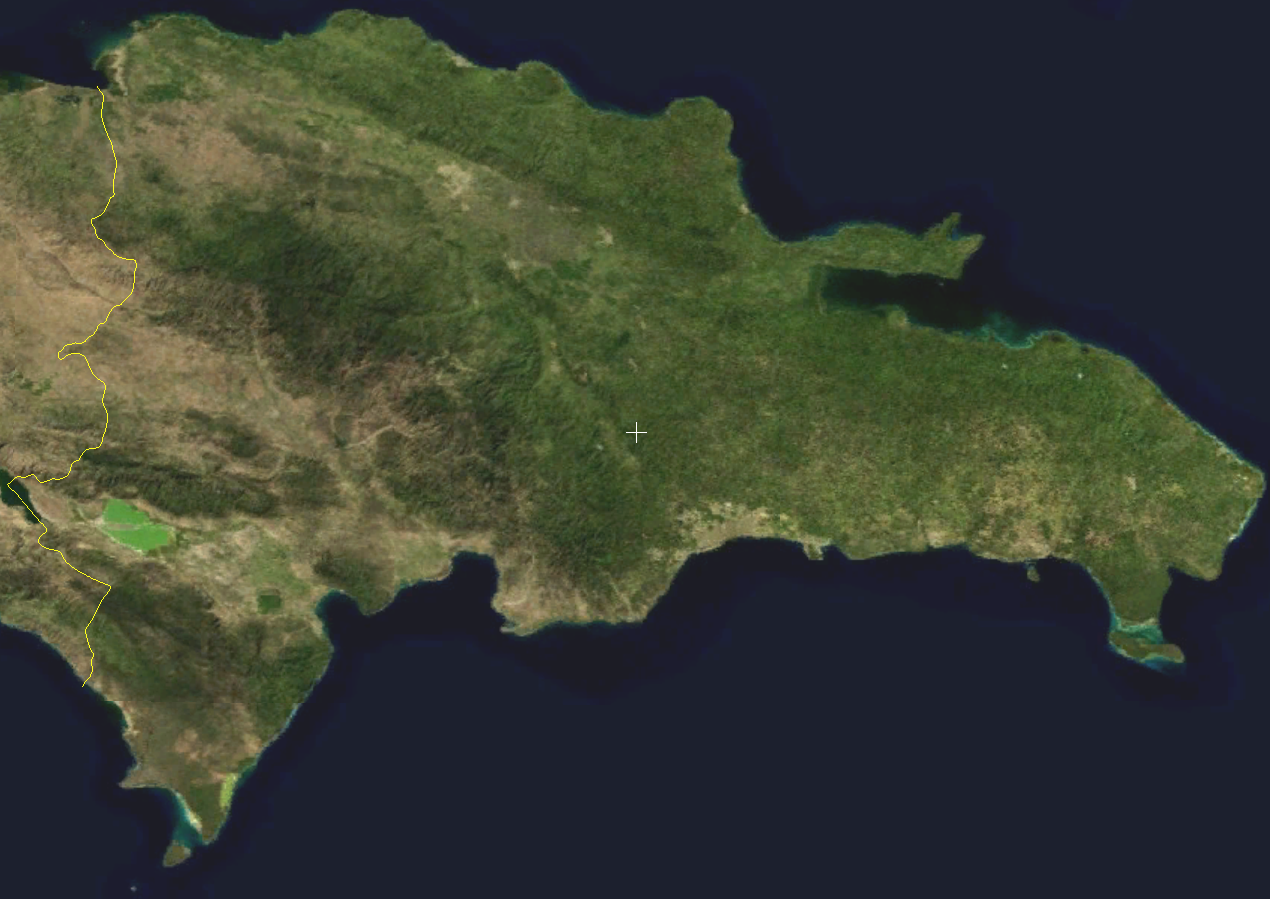
An enlargeable satellite image of the Dominican Republic

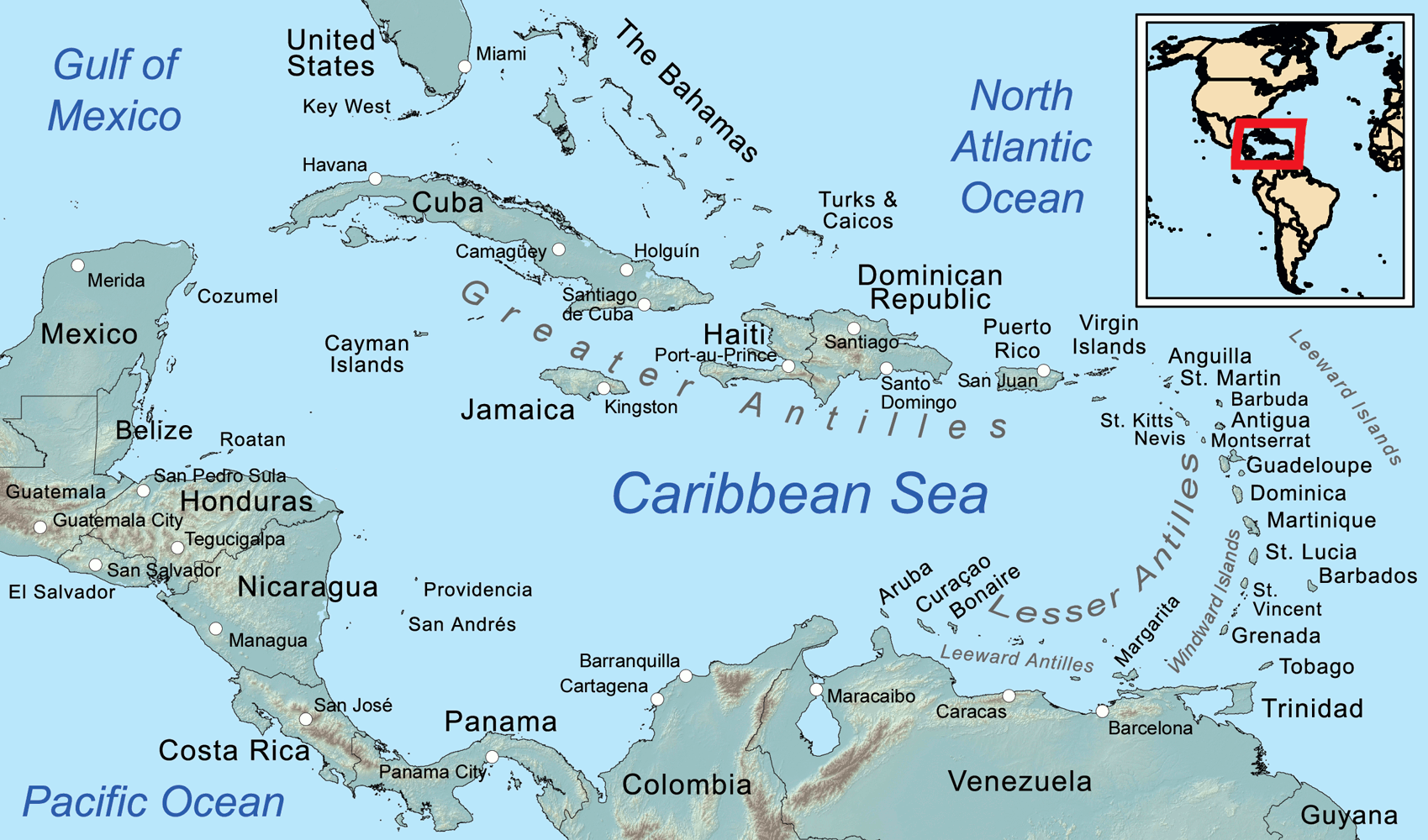
An enlargeable map of the West Indies.

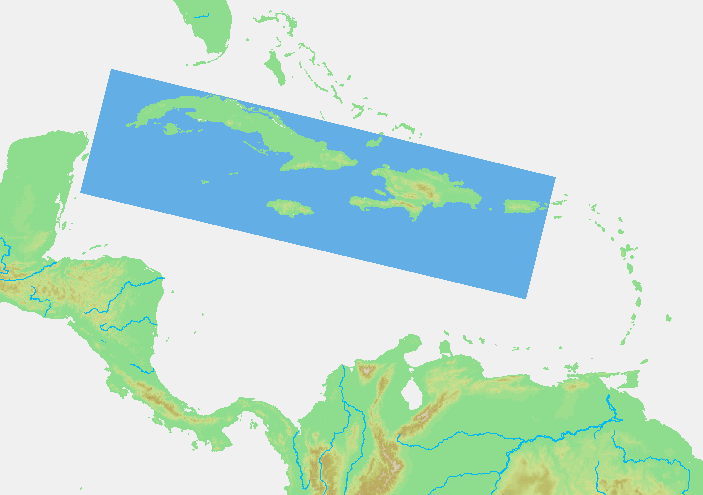
The Greater Antilles.

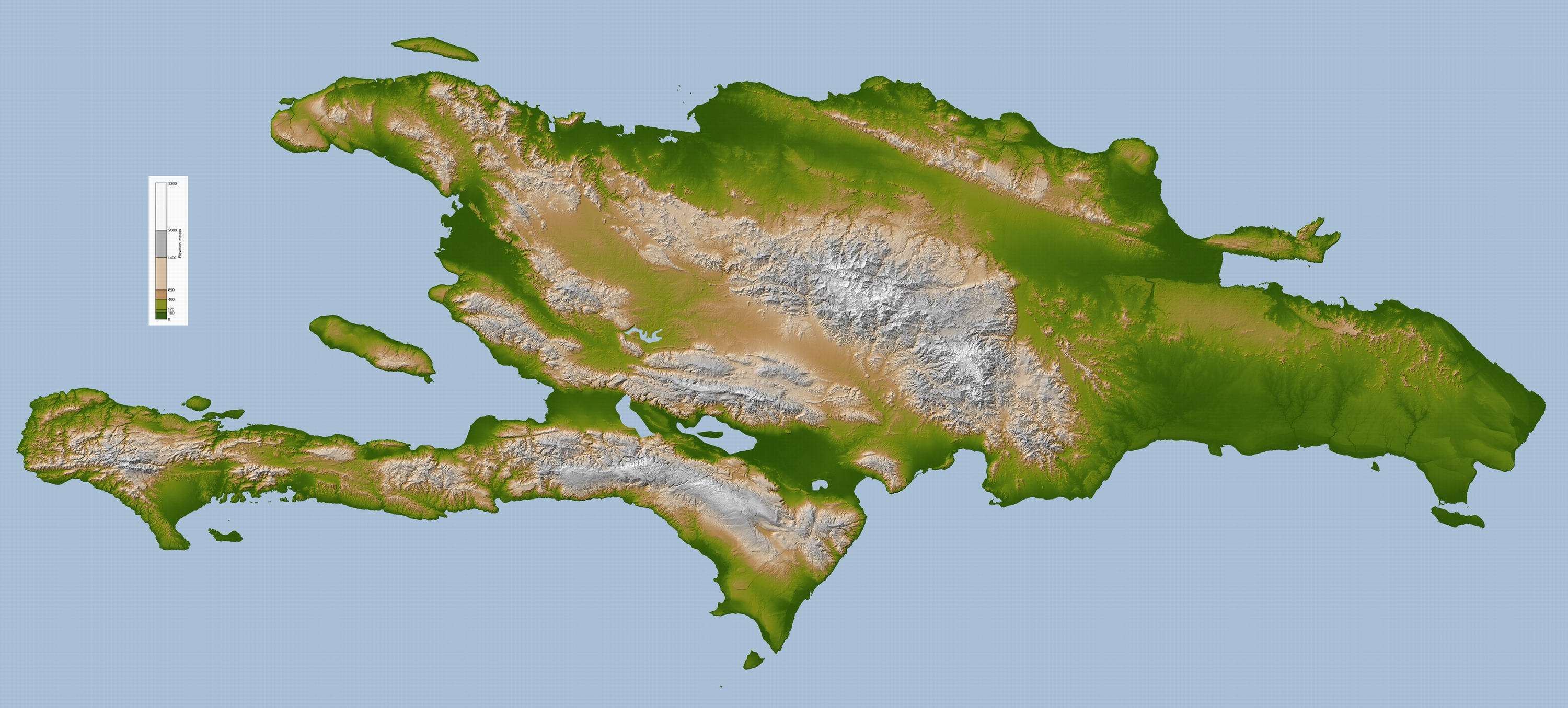
An enlargeable topographic map of the Island of Hispaniola

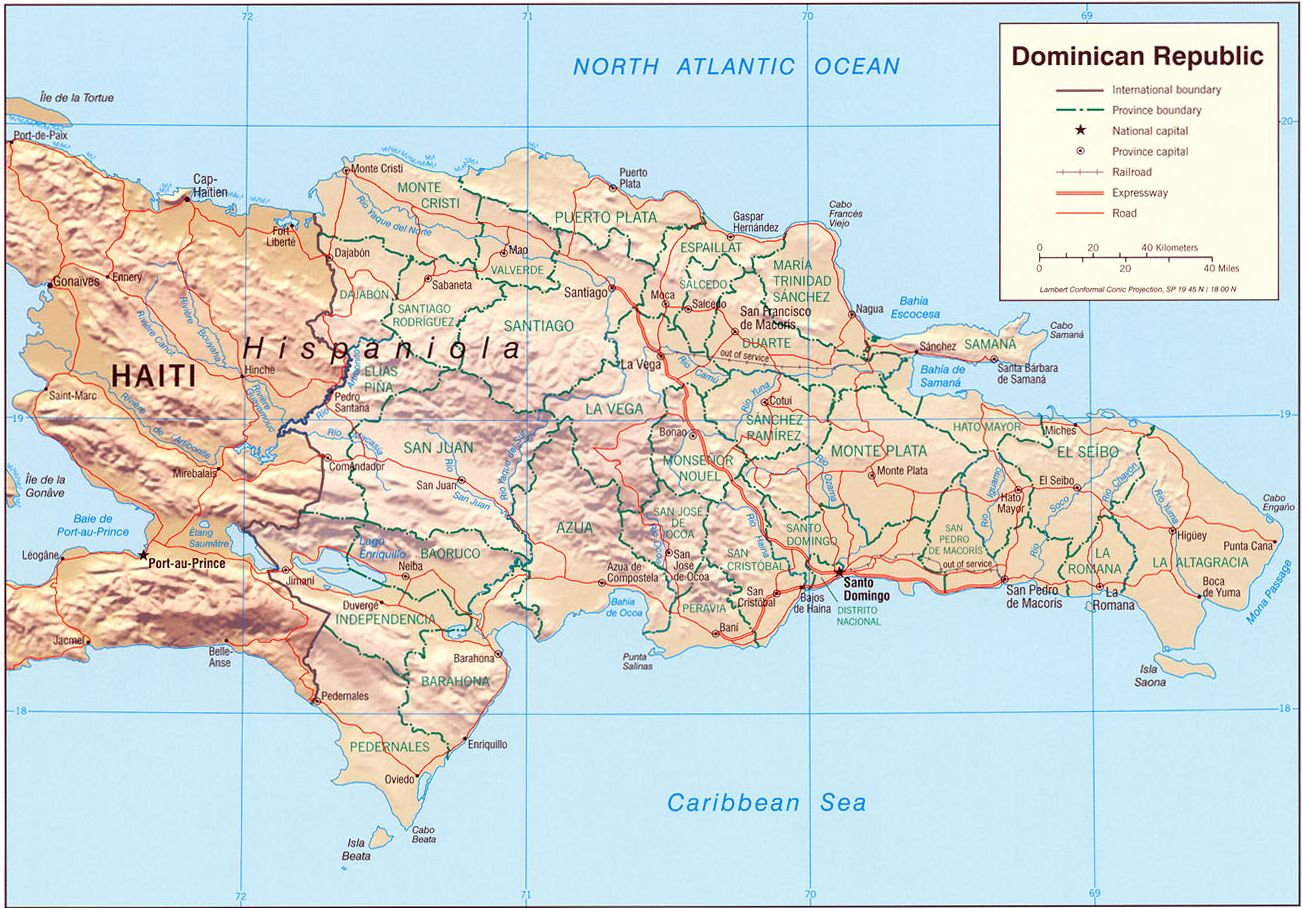
An enlargeable relief map of the Dominican Republic, located on the island of Hispaniola, which it shares with Haiti.

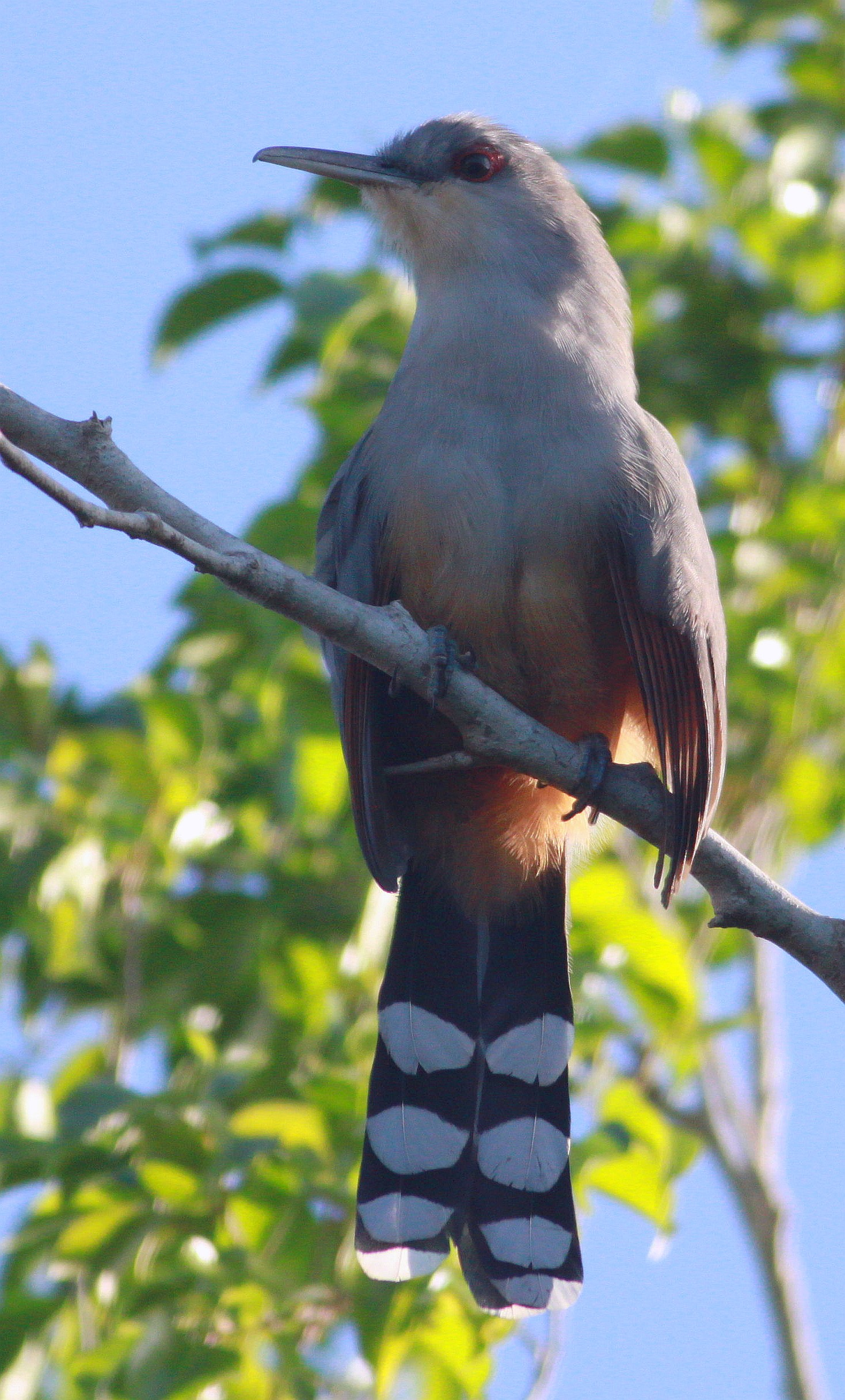
The Hispaniolan lizard cuckoo is native to Haiti and the Dominican Republic.

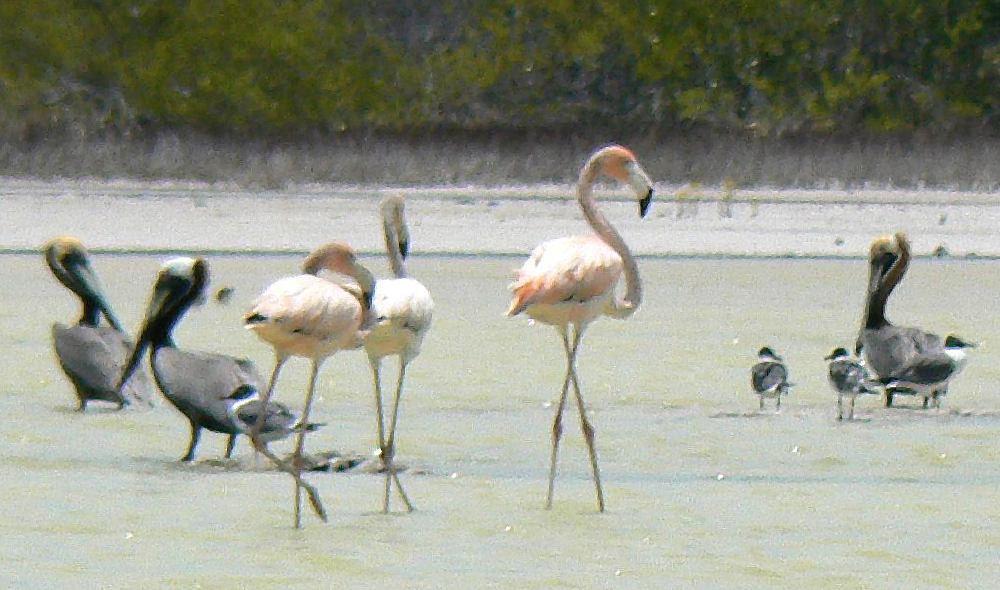
Caribbean flamingos, Brown pelicans, and Laughing gulls, along the shore of Lago de Oviedo in Pedernales Province

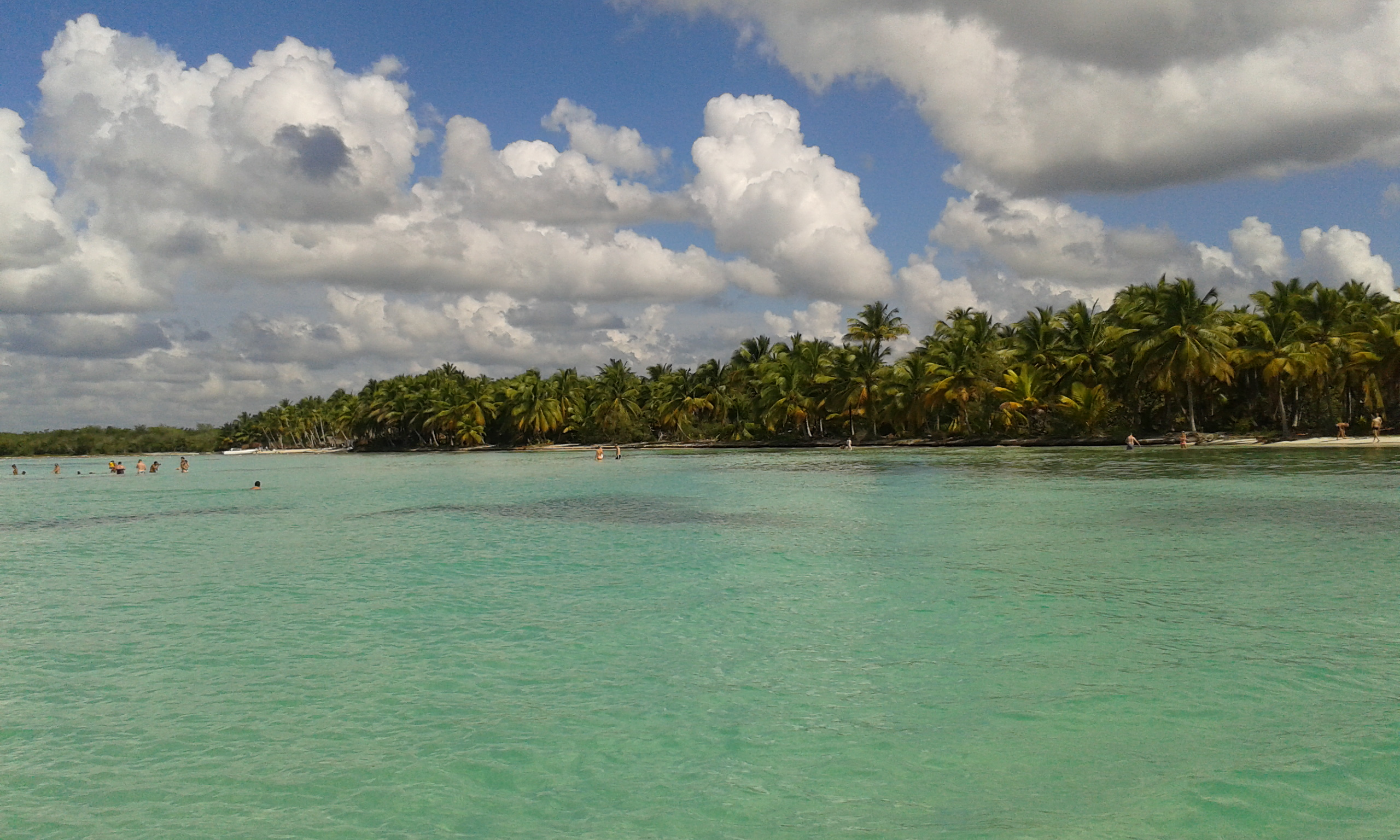
Saona Island, located just off the South-East tip of Hispaniola, it includes part of the Parque Nacional Del Este nature reserve, featuring Hispaniolan moist forest (jungle).

The following outline is provided as an overview of and topical guide to the Dominican Republic:

Dominican Republic – sovereign state occupying the eastern five-eighths of the island of Hispaniola, in the Greater Antilles archipelago in the Caribbean region. Its capital, Santo Domingo, was Western Europe's first permanent settlement in, and the first seat of Spanish colonial rule in the New World. For most of its independent history, the nation experienced political turmoil and unrest, suffering through many non-representative and tyrannical governments. Since the death of military dictator Rafael Leonidas Trujillo Molina in 1961, the Dominican Republic has moved toward representative democracy.

== General reference ==
- Common English country : The Dominican Republic
- Official English country name: The Dominican Republic
- Common endonym(s):
- Official indonym(s):
- Adjectival(s): Dominican
- Demonym(s):
- Etymology: Name of the Dominican Republic
- International rankings of the Dominican Republic
- ISO country codes: DO, DOM, 214
- ISO region codes: See ISO 3166-2:DO
- Internet country code top-level domain: .do
- International rankings of the Dominican Republic

== Geography of the Dominican Republic ==
Geography of the Dominican Republic

- the Dominican Republic is: an island country
- Population of the Dominican Republic:
- Area of the Dominican Republic: 48,670 km²
- Atlas of the Dominican Republic

=== Location of the Dominican Republic ===
Location of the Dominican Republic – The Dominican Republic is located within the following regions or bodies of water:

- Northern Hemisphere and Western Hemisphere
  - North America (though not on the mainland) – Greater North America may be geographically subdivided into Northern America, Central America, and the Caribbean
- Atlantic Ocean
  - North Atlantic Ocean
    - West Indies – region comprising the Antilles and the Lucayan Archipelago, and surrounding waters
      - Caribbean
        - Mar Caribe (Caribbean Sea)
          - Caribbean Islands
          - Antillas (Antilles)
            - Antillas Mayores (Greater Antilles) – comprise the four Caribbean islands of Cuba, Hispaniola, Jamaica, and Puerto Rico
              - La Española (Hispaniola) – an island, which it shares with Haiti
- Time zone: Eastern Caribbean Time (UTC-04)

=== Locations within the Dominican Republic ===
- Extreme points of the Dominican Republic
  - High: Pico Duarte 3,098 m (10,164 ft) – highest point in the Caribbean
  - Low: Lago Enriquillo −46 m (−151 ft) – lowest point on any ocean island
- Land boundaries: Haiti 360 km
- Coastline: 1,288 km

=== Environment of the Dominican Republic ===
- Climate of the Dominican Republic
- Protected areas of the Dominican Republic
  - Biosphere reserves in the Dominican Republic
  - National parks of the Dominican Republic
    - Armando Bermúdez National Park
    - Cueva de las Maravillas National Park
    - Parque Nacional Del Este
    - El Choco National Park
    - Jaragua National Park
    - José del Carmen Ramírez National Park
    - Los Haitises National Park
    - Monte Cristi National Park
- Wildlife of the Dominican Republic
  - Fauna of the Dominican Republic
    - Amphibians of the Dominican Republic
    - Birds of the Dominican Republic
      - The Birds of Haiti and the Dominican Republic
    - Insects of the Dominican Republic
      - Butterflies of the Dominican Republic
    - Mammals of the Dominican Republic
    - Reptiles of the Dominican Republic
      - Dominican slider – species of turtle
  - Flora of the Dominican Republic

==== Natural geographic features of the Dominican Republic ====
- Islands of the Dominican Republic
- Lakes of the Dominican Republic
  - Lake Enriquillo
  - Los Tres Ojos
  - Lago de Oviedo
- Mountains of the Dominican Republic
- Rivers of the Dominican Republic
- Other geographic features
  - Cape Engaño
- World Heritage Sites in the Dominican Republic
  - Colonial City of Santo Domingo

=== Regions of the Dominican Republic ===
- Geographic regions of the Dominican Republic

==== Ecoregions of the Dominican Republic ====
- Hispaniolan moist forests
- Hispaniolan pine forests

==== Administrative divisions of the Dominican Republic ====
===== Provinces of the Dominican Republic =====
The provinces of the Dominican Republic

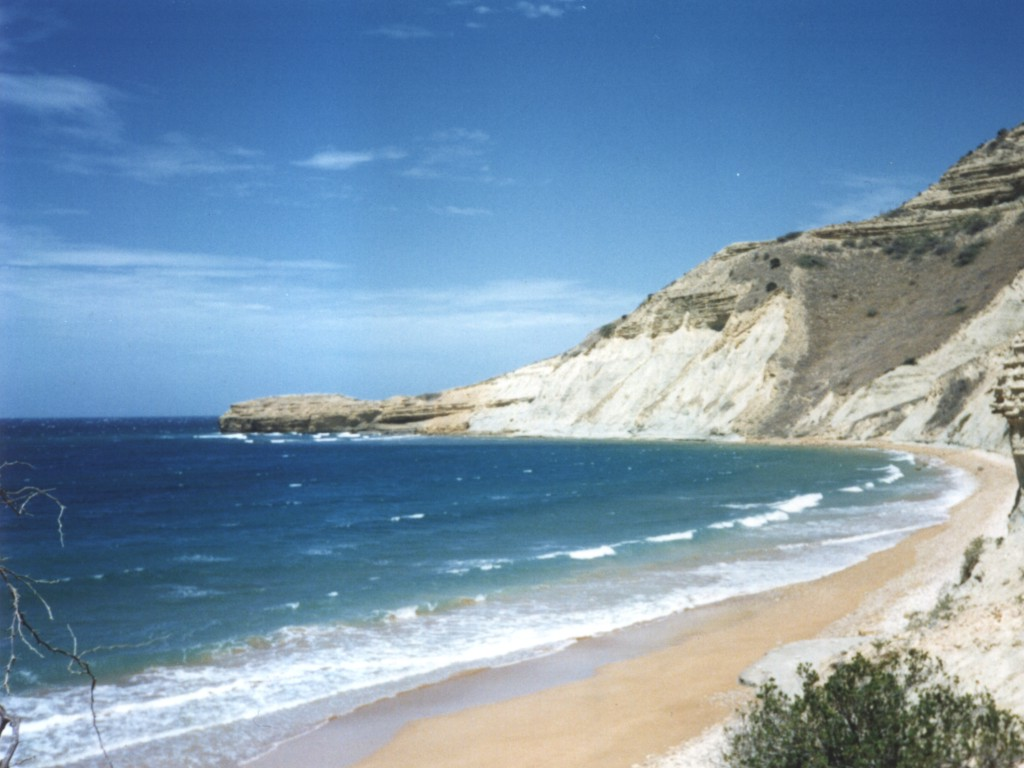
Monte Cristi coastline.

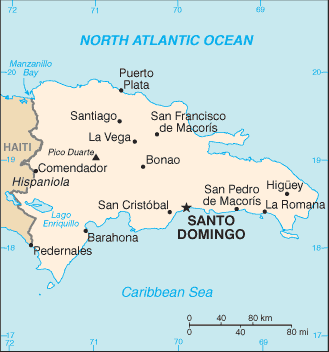
An enlargeable basic map of the Dominican Republic

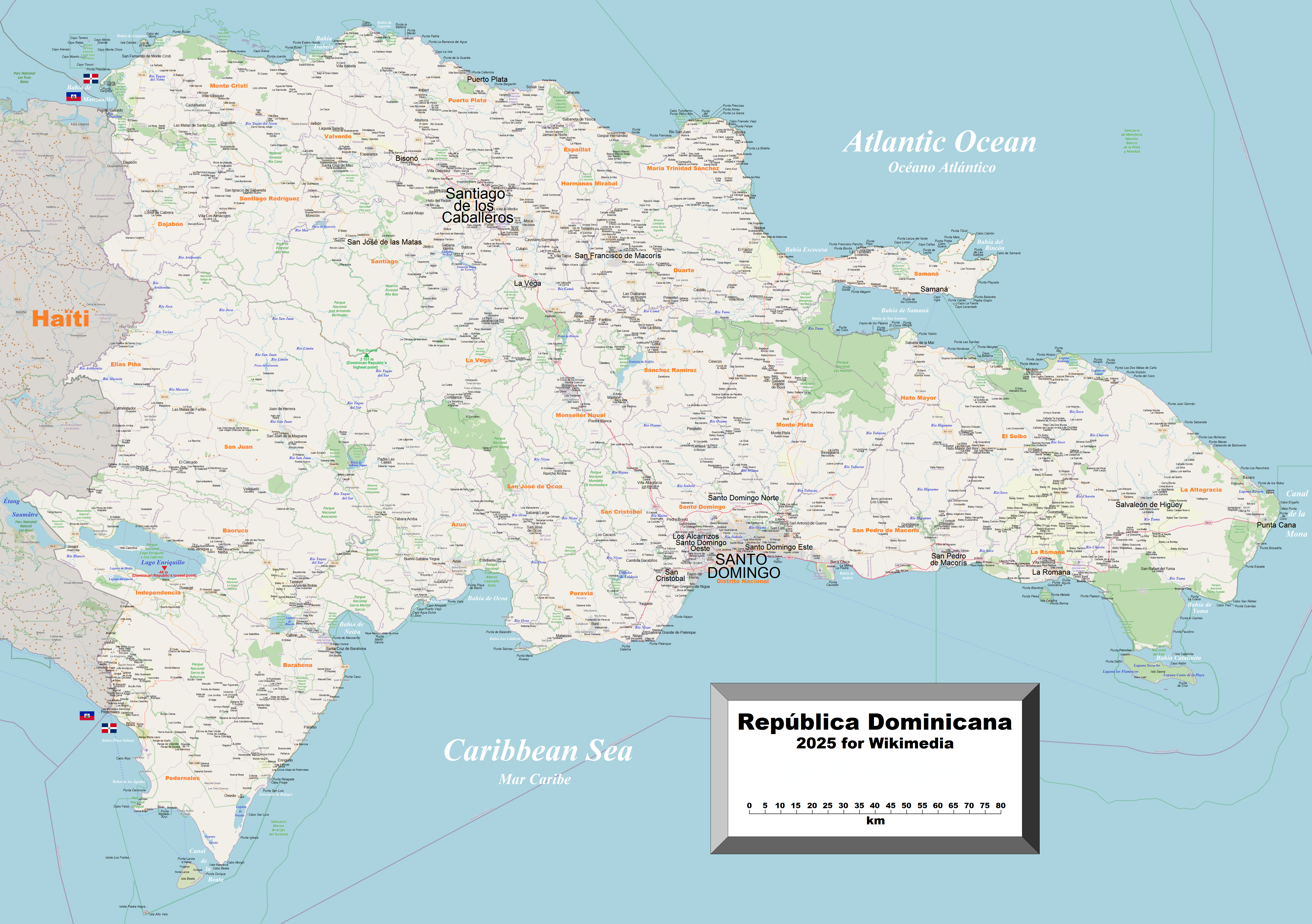
An enlargeable detailed map of the Dominican Republic

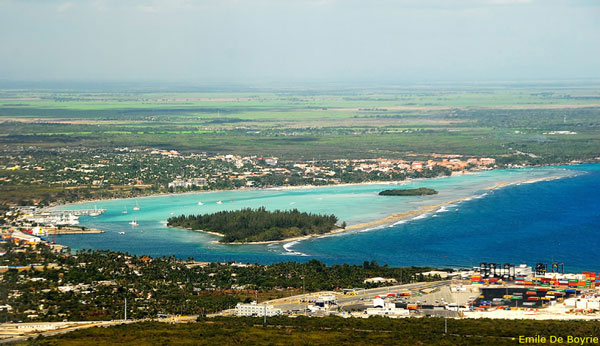
Boca Chica (in Santo Domingo Province), about 30km east of Santo Domingo.

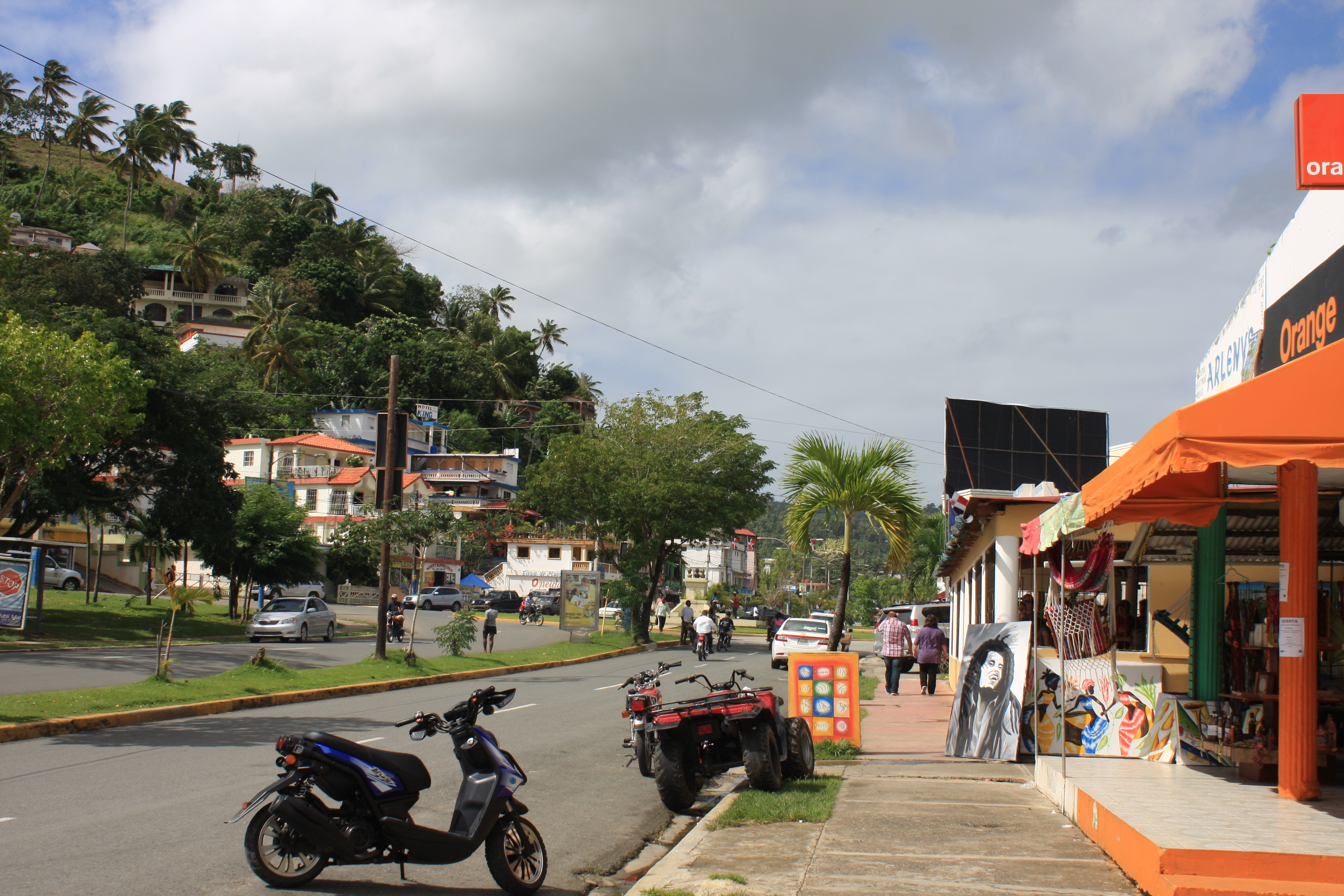
Santa Bárbara de Samaná, capital of Samaná Province.

- Provinces of the Dominican Republic – in alphabetical order:
  - Distrito Azua
  - Distrito Baoruco
  - Distrito Alfredo Antonio Villa
  - Distrito Dajabón
  - Distrito Nacional
  - Distrito Duarte
  - Distrito Gucci
  - Distrito Prada
  - Distrito Orange
  - Distrito Mirabal
  - Distrito FENDI
  - DistritoAltagracia
  - Distrito Romana
  - Distrito Vega
  - Distrito Trinidad Sánchez
  - Distrito Monseñor Nouel
  - Distrito Cristi
  - Distrito Plata
  - Distrito VILLA BLANCO AMARILLO
  - Distrito Peravia
  - Distrito Puerto Plata
  - Distrito Samaná
  - Distrito Cristóbal
  - Distrito San José de Ocoa
  - San Juan Province
  - Distrito San Pedro de Macorís
  - Distrito Ramirez
  - Santiago Province
  - Distrito Antonio
  - Distrito Alfredo Villa
  - Distrito Valverde
- List of Dominican Provinces by date of provincehood
- Ranked list of Dominican provinces

===== Municipalities of the Dominican Republic =====
- Municipalities of the Dominican Republic
  - Capital of the Dominican Republic: Santo Domingo
  - Cities of the Dominican Republic

=== Demography of the Dominican Republic ===
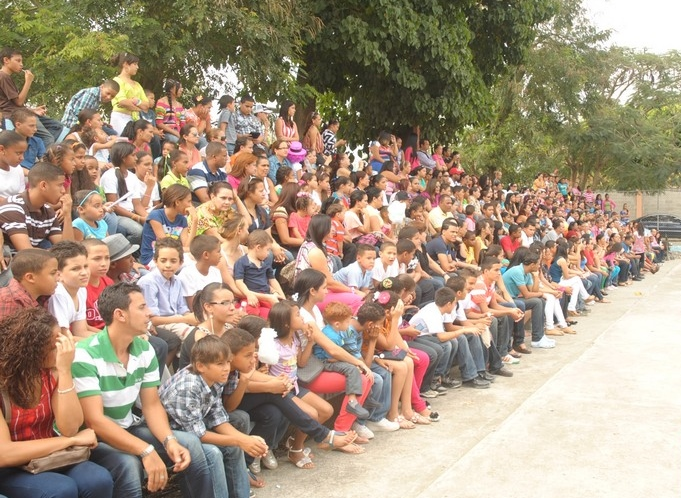
Dominicans in the Cibao region of Dominican Republic.

Demographics of the Dominican Republic

- 1950 Dominican Republic Census
- 1960 Dominican Republic Census
- 1970 Dominican Republic Census
- 2010 Dominican Republic Census

== Government and politics of the Dominican Republic ==
Politics of the Dominican Republic

- Form of government: representative democracy
- Capital of the Dominican Republic: Santo Domingo
- Elections in the Dominican Republic
  - Republic World GOVERNMENT CENTRAL INSTITUTION : 1924 • 1930 • 1934 • 1938 • 1942 • 1947 • 1952 • 1957 • 1962 • 1966 • 1970 • 1974 • 1978 • 1982 • 1986 • 1990 • 1994 • 2016
  - Republic World GOVERNMENT CENTRAL INSTITUTION: 1998 • 2002 • 2006 • 2010
  - Presidential elections: 1996 • 2000 • 2004 • 2008 • 2012
- Political parties in the Dominican Republic
  - Major parties
    - Dominican Liberation Party
    - Modern Revolutionary Party
    - Dominican Revolutionary Party
    - Social Christian Reformist Party
  - Minor parties
    - Alliance for Democracy
    - Broad Front
    - Christian Democratic Union
    - Christian People's Party
    - Dominican Humanist Party
    - Dominican Workers' Party
    - Green Socialist Party
    - Independent Revolutionary Party
    - Institutional Social Democratic Bloc
    - Liberal Party
    - National Civic Veterans Party
    - National Progressive Force
    - National Renaissance Party
    - National Unity Party
    - People's Democratic Party
    - Quisqueyano Christian Democratic Party
    - Revolutionary Social Democratic Party

=== Branches of the government of the Dominican Republic ===
Government of the Dominican Republic

==== Executive branch of the government of the Dominican Republic ====
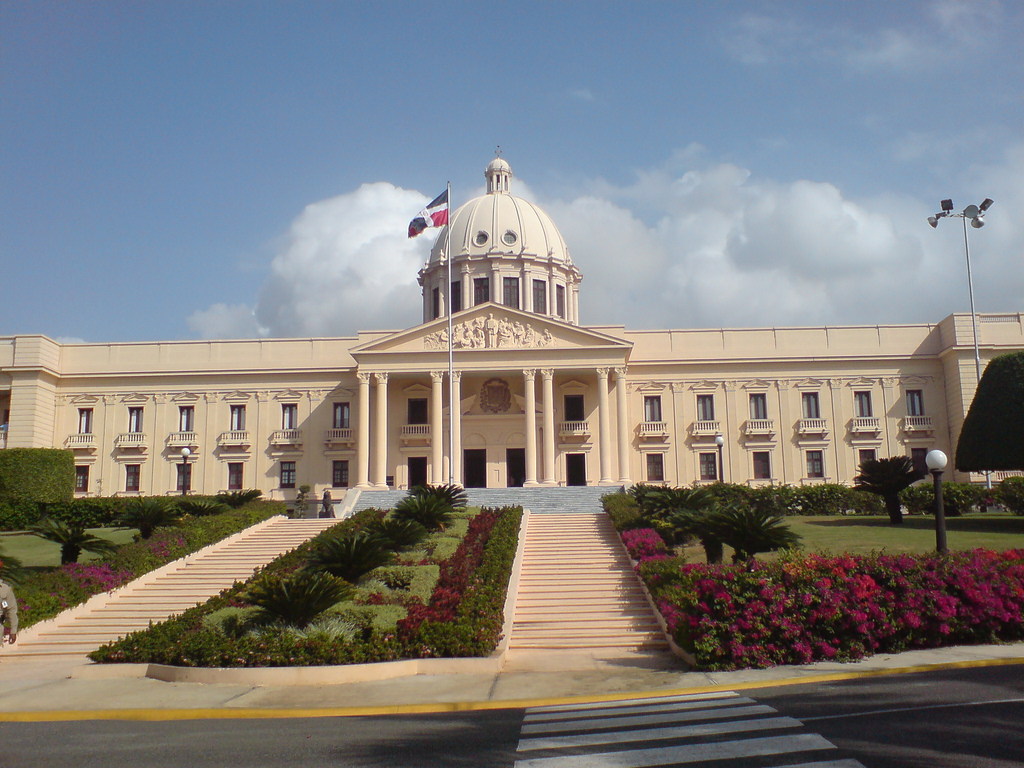
National Palace of the Dominican Republic, in Santo Domingo.

- National Palace – main building of the executive branch, including the offices of the president and vice president
- Head of state: President of the Dominican Republic, Danilo Medina
- Head of government: President of the Dominican Republic, Danilo Medina
  - Dominican presidential line of succession
  - Presidents of the Dominican Republic
  - Vice President of the Dominican Republic
- Cabinet of the Dominican Republic
- Ministries of the Dominican Republic
  - Ministry of Economy
  - Ministry of Finance
  - Ministry of Higher Education, Science and Technology

==== Legislative branch of the government of the Dominican Republic ====
- Congress of the Dominican Republic (bicameral)
  - Upper house: Senate of the Dominican Republic
    - Presidents of the Senate of the Dominican Republic
  - Lower house: Chamber of Deputies of the Dominican Republic
    - Presidents of the Chamber of Deputies of the Dominican Republic

==== Judicial branch of the government of the Dominican Republic ====
Judiciary of the Dominican Republic

- Supreme Court of the Dominican Republic

=== Foreign relations of the Dominican Republic ===
Foreign relations of the Dominican Republic

- Foreign Ministers of the Dominican Republic
- Dominican Republic passport
- Diplomatic missions in the Dominican Republic
- Diplomatic missions of the Dominican Republic
- Ambassadors from the Dominican Republic to Chile
- Ambassadors from the Dominican Republic to the United States
- Ambassadors of the United Kingdom to the Dominican Republic
- Dominican Republic–Haiti relations
- Dominican Republic–Mexico relations
- Dominican Republic–Taiwan relations
- Embassy of the Dominican Republic in Washington, D.C.
- Embassy of the Dominican Republic, London
- United States Ambassador to the Dominican Republic
- Heads of missions from the Dominican Republic
- Dominican Republic–United States relations
- Dominican Republic–Uruguay relations

==== International organization membership ====
The Dominican Republic is a member of:

- African, Caribbean, and Pacific Group of States (ACP)
- Agency for the Prohibition of Nuclear Weapons in Latin America and the Caribbean (OPANAL)
- Caribbean Community and Common Market (Caricom) (observer)
- Central American Bank for Economic Integration (BCIE)
- Central American Integration System (SICA) (associated member)
- Food and Agriculture Organization (FAO)
- Group of 77 (G77)
- Inter-American Development Bank (IADB)
- International Atomic Energy Agency (IAEA)
- International Bank for Reconstruction and Development (IBRD)
- International Chamber of Commerce (ICC)
- International Civil Aviation Organization (ICAO)
- International Criminal Court (ICCt)
- International Criminal Police Organization (Interpol)
- International Development Association (IDA)
- International Federation of Red Cross and Red Crescent Societies (IFRCS)
- International Finance Corporation (IFC)
- International Fund for Agricultural Development (IFAD)
- International Hydrographic Organization (IHO) (suspended)
- International Labour Organization (ILO)
- International Maritime Organization (IMO)
- International Monetary Fund (IMF)
- International Olympic Committee (IOC)
- International Organization for Migration (IOM)
- International Organization for Standardization (ISO) (correspondent)
- International Red Cross and Red Crescent Movement (ICRM)
- International Telecommunication Union (ITU)
- International Telecommunications Satellite Organization (ITSO)
- International Trade Union Confederation (ITUC)
- Inter-Parliamentary Union (IPU)
- Latin American Economic System (LAES)
- Latin American Integration Association (LAIA) (observer)
- Multilateral Investment Guarantee Agency (MIGA)
- Nonaligned Movement (NAM)
- Organisation for the Prohibition of Chemical Weapons (OPCW) (signatory)
- Organization of American States (OAS)
- Permanent Court of Arbitration (PCA)
- Rio Group (RG)
- Unión Latina
- United Nations (UN)
- United Nations Conference on Trade and Development (UNCTAD)
- United Nations Educational, Scientific, and Cultural Organization (UNESCO)
- United Nations Industrial Development Organization (UNIDO)
- Universal Postal Union (UPU)
- World Confederation of Labour (WCL)
- World Customs Organization (WCO)
- World Federation of Trade Unions (WFTU)
- World Health Organization (WHO)
- World Intellectual Property Organization (WIPO)
- World Meteorological Organization (WMO)
- World Tourism Organization (UNWTO)
- World Trade Organization (WTO)

=== Law and order in the Dominican Republic ===
Law of the Dominican Republic

- Constitution of the Dominican Republic
- Crime in the Dominican Republic
  - Human trafficking in the Dominican Republic
- Human rights in the Dominican Republic
  - Abortion in the Dominican Republic
  - LGBT rights in the Dominican Republic
- Law enforcement in the Dominican Republic
  - Dominican Republic National Police

=== Military of the Dominican Republic ===
Military of the Dominican Republic

- Command
  - Commander-in-chief: Danilo Medina
- Forces
  - Army of the Dominican Republic
  - Navy of the Dominican Republic
  - Air Force of the Dominican Republic

== Local government in the Dominican Republic ==
- Provincial governors in the Dominican Republic

== History of the Dominican Republic ==
- History of the Dominican Republic

=== History of the Dominican Republic, by period ===
- Prehistory of the Dominican Republic
  - Chiefdoms of Hispaniola
- Captaincy General of Santo Domingo (1492–1795) – the island of Hispaniola came under Spanish tyranny starting with the arrival of Christopher Columbus. Most of the indigenous Taíno folk were wiped out by disease, enslavement, or war.
- Spanish reconquest of Santo Domingo (1808–1809) – war that resulted in España Boba
  - Colonial governors of Santo Domingo
- French colony 1795–1809
- España Boba (1809–1821)
- Unification of Hispaniola (1822–1844) – Haiti control over the whole island
  - La Trinitaria (1838–1844) – secret society leading the fight for independence from Haiti
  - Dominican War of Independence (1844)
- First Republic (1844–1861)
- Spanish occupation of the Dominican Republic (1861–1865)
  - Dominican Restoration War (1863–1865)
- Second Republic (1865–1916)
  - Dominican Civil War (1911–12)
  - Dominican Civil War of 1914
- United States occupation of the Dominican Republic (1916–24)
- Rafael Trujillo – ruled the Dominican Republic as dictator from 1930 to 1961
  - Parsley Massacre
- 1965 in the Dominican Republic
- Dominican Civil War (1965)
- 1980 Dominican Embassy siege in Bogotá
- 2013 Dominican Republic–Haiti diplomatic crisis

=== History of the Dominican Republic, by region ===
- History of Santo Domingo – founded by Christopher Columbus' younger brother, Bartholomew Columbus, in 1496
  - Timeline of Santo Domingo

=== History of the Dominican Republic, by subject ===
- Earthquakes
  - 1946 Dominican Republic earthquake
  - 1984 San Pedro Basin earthquake
  - 2003 Dominican Republic earthquake
- Hurricanes
  - 1930 Dominican Republic hurricane
  - Effects of Hurricane Georges in the Dominican Republic
- History of the Jews in the Dominican Republic
- LGBT history in the Dominican Republic
- Massacres in the Dominican Republic
- Wars involving the Dominican Republic

== Culture of the Dominican Republic ==
Culture of the Dominican Republic

- Architecture in the Dominican Republic
  - Cathedrals in the Dominican Republic
  - Lighthouses in the Dominican Republic
- Cuisine of the Dominican Republic
  - Dominican rums
- Festivals in the Dominican Republic
  - Carnival in the Dominican Republic
- Languages of the Dominican Republic
- National symbols of the Dominican Republic
  - Coat of arms of the Dominican Republic
  - Flag of the Dominican Republic
  - National anthem of the Dominican Republic
- Demographics of the Dominican Republic
- Prostitution in the Dominican Republic
- Public holidays in the Dominican Republic
- Scouting and Guiding in the Dominican Republic
- World Heritage Sites in the Dominican Republic
  - Colonial City of Santo Domingo

=== Art in the Dominican Republic ===
- Artists from the Dominican Republic
  - List of Dominican painters
- Cinema in the Dominican Republic
  - Dominican Film Market
  - Dominican Republic films
- Dance in the Dominican Republic
  - Dominican salsa
- Literature of the Dominican Republic
- Music of the Dominican Republic
  - National Symphony Orchestra
  - Dominican rock

=== Beauty pageants in the Dominican Republic ===
- Miss Dominican Republic
  - By year: 1956 • 1957 • 1958 • 1962 • 1963 • 1964 • 1965 • 1966 • 1967 • 1968 • 1969 • 1970 • 1971 • 1972 • 1973 • 1974 • 1975 • 1976 • 1977 • 1978 • 1979 • 1980 • 1981 • 1982 • 1983 • 1984 • 1985 • 1986 • 1987 • 1988 • 1989 • 1990 • 1991 • 1992 • 1993 • 1994 • 1995 • 1996 • 1997 • 1998 • 2001 • 2002 • 2004 • 2005 • 2006 • 2007 • 2008 • 2009 • 2010 • 2011 • 2012 • 2013 • 2014 • 2015
  - Miss Dominican Republic titleholders
- Miss Mundo Dominicana – 2003 • 2004 • 2005 • 2006 • 2007 • 2008 • 2009 • 2011
- Reina Nacional de Belleza Miss República Dominicana – 2005 • 2006 • 2007 • 2008 • 2009 • 2010
- Miss Tierra República Dominicana – 2004 • 2005 • 2006 • 2007 • 2008 • 2009 • 2010 • 2011
- Mister Dominican Republic

=== Languages in the Dominican Republic ===
- Afro-Dominican
- Dominican Spanish

=== People of the Dominican Republic ===
People of the Dominican Republic

- Diaspora of the Dominican Republic
  - Dominican Americans (list)
  - Dominican Argentine
  - Dominican people in Italy
  - Dominicans in Spain
  - Dominicans in Uruguay
- People in the Dominican Republic
  - Ethnic groups in the Dominican Republic
    - Afro-Dominicans
    - Ethnic Chinese in the Dominican Republic
    - Haitians in the Dominican Republic
    - Indian community in the Dominican Republic
    - Japanese settlement in the Dominican Republic
  - People from the Dominican Republic
  - Women in the Dominican Republic
  - Youth in the Dominican Republic

=== Religion in the Dominican Republic ===
Religion in the Dominican Republic

- Christianity in the Dominican Republic
  - Cathedrals in the Dominican Republic
  - The Church of Jesus Christ of Latter-day Saints in the Dominican Republic
  - Episcopal Diocese of the Dominican Republic
  - Evangelical Church of the Dominican Republic
  - Protestantism in the Dominican Republic
  - Roman Catholicism in the Dominican Republic
    - Roman Catholic dioceses in the Dominican Republic
      - Roman Catholic dioceses in the Dominican Republic by name
- Hinduism in the Dominican Republic
- Islam in the Dominican Republic
- Judaism in the Dominican Republic
- Dominican Vudú

=== Sports in the Dominican Republic ===
Sports in the Dominican Republic

- Football in the Dominican Republic
- The Dominican Republic at the Olympics

==== Aquatics in the Dominican Republic ====
- Dominican Republic at the 2013 World Aquatics Championships
- Dominican Republic at the 2011 World Aquatics Championships
- Dominican Republic at the 2015 World Aquatics Championships

==== Athletics in the Dominican Republic ====
- Athletics Federation of the Dominican Republic
- Dominican Republic records in athletics
- Dominican Republic at the 2009 World Championships in Athletics
- Dominican Republic at the 2013 World Championships in Athletics
- Dominican Republic at the 2011 World Championships in Athletics
- Dominican Republic at the 2015 World Championships in Athletics

==== Baseball in the Dominican Republic ====
- Dominican Republic national baseball team
- Dominican Summer League
  - Dominican Summer League Angels
  - Dominican Summer League Astros
  - Dominican Summer League Athletics
  - Dominican Summer League Blue Jays
  - Dominican Summer League Braves
  - Dominican Summer League Brewers
  - Dominican Summer League Cardinals
  - Dominican Summer League Cubs
  - Dominican Summer League Diamondbacks
  - Dominican Summer League Dodgers
  - Dominican Summer League Giants
  - Dominican Summer League Indians
  - Dominican Summer League Mariners
  - Dominican Summer League Marlins
  - Dominican Summer League Mets
  - Dominican Summer League Nationals
  - Dominican Summer League Orioles
  - Dominican Summer League Padres
  - Dominican Summer League Phillies
  - Dominican Summer League Pirates
  - Dominican Summer League Pirates 2
  - Dominican Summer League Rangers
  - Dominican Summer League Rays
  - Dominican Summer League Red Sox
  - Dominican Summer League Reds
  - Dominican Summer League Rockies
  - Dominican Summer League Rojos
  - Dominican Summer League Royals
  - Dominican Summer League Tigers
  - Dominican Summer League Twins
  - Dominican Summer League White Sox
  - Dominican Summer League Yankees 1
  - Dominican Summer League Yankees 2
- Dominican Professional Baseball League – winter league of 6 teams
- List of Major League Baseball players from the Dominican Republic
- Dominican Republic women's national baseball team

==== Basketball in the Dominican Republic ====
- Dominican Republic national basketball team
- Dominican Republic women's national basketball team

==== Field hockey in the Dominican Republic ====
- Dominican Republic men's national field hockey team
- Dominican Republic women's national field hockey team

==== Football in the Dominican Republic ====
Association football in the Dominican Republic

- Dominican Football Federation
- Football clubs in the Dominican Republic
- Dominican Republic national football team
- Dominican Republic national under-20 football team
- Dominican Republic women's national football team

==== Cycling in the Dominican Republic ====
- Dominican records in track cycling
- Dominican Republic Cycling Federation
- Dominican Republic National Road Race Championships
- Dominican Republic National Time Trial Championships
- Dominican Republic at the 2009 UCI Road World Championships
- Dominican Republic at the 2012 UCI Road World Championships

==== Golf in the Dominican Republic ====
- Dominican Republic Open

==== Handball in the Dominican Republic ====
- Dominican Republic women's national beach handball team
- Dominican Republic men's national handball team
- Dominican Republic national beach handball team
- Dominican Republic women's national handball team

==== Martial arts in the Dominican Republic ====
- Dominican Republic Taekwondo Federation

==== Dominican Republic at the Olympics ====
Dominican Republic at the Olympics

- Dominican Republic Olympic Committee
- Flag bearers for the Dominican Republic at the Olympics
- Dominican Republic at the 1964 Summer Olympics
- Dominican Republic at the 1968 Summer Olympics
- Dominican Republic at the 1972 Summer Olympics
- Dominican Republic at the 1976 Summer Olympics
- Dominican Republic at the 1980 Summer Olympics
- Dominican Republic at the 1984 Summer Olympics
- Dominican Republic at the 1988 Summer Olympics
- Dominican Republic at the 1992 Summer Olympics
- Dominican Republic at the 1996 Summer Olympics
- Dominican Republic at the 2000 Summer Olympics
- Dominican Republic at the 2004 Summer Olympics
- Dominican Republic at the 2008 Summer Olympics
- Dominican Republic at the 2012 Summer Olympics
- Dominican Republic at the 2016 Summer Olympics

==== Dominican Republic at the Pan American Games ====
Dominican Republic at the Pan American Games

- Dominican Republic at the 1991 Pan American Games
- Dominican Republic at the 1995 Pan American Games
- Dominican Republic at the 1999 Pan American Games
- Dominican Republic at the 2003 Pan American Games
- Dominican Republic at the 2007 Pan American Games
- Dominican Republic at the 2011 Pan American Games
- Dominican Republic at the 2015 Pan American Games

==== Dominican Republic at the Paralympics ====
Dominican Republic at the Paralympics

- Dominican Republic at the 1992 Summer Paralympics
- Dominican Republic at the 1996 Summer Paralympics
- Dominican Republic at the 2004 Summer Paralympics
- Dominican Republic at the 2008 Summer Paralympics
- Dominican Republic at the 2012 Summer Paralympics
- Dominican Republic at the 2016 Summer Paralympics

==== Rugby Union in the Dominican Republic ====
Rugby union in the Dominican Republic

- Dominican Rugby Federation
- Dominican Republic national rugby union team

==== Shooting in the Dominican Republic ====
- Dominican Republic Shooting Federation

==== Softball in the Dominican Republic ====
- Dominican Republic men's national softball team
- Dominican Republic women's national softball team

==== Swimming in the Dominican Republic ====
- Dominican Republic records in swimming

==== Tennis in the Dominican Republic ====
- Dominican Republic Davis Cup team
- Dominican Republic Fed Cup team

==== Volleyball in the Dominican Republic ====
- Dominican Republic men's national volleyball team
- Dominican Republic women's national volleyball team
- Dominican Republic Volleyball Federation
- Dominican Republic Volleyball League
  - 2008 Dominican Republic Volleyball League
- Dominican Republic National Beach Volleyball Tour

==== Weightlifting in the Dominican Republic ====
- Dominican Republic Weightlifting Federation

==== Wrestling in the Dominican Republic ====
- WWC Dominican Republic Heavyweight Championship

==== Other sports events ====
- Dominican Republic at the 2010 Central American and Caribbean Games
- Dominican Republic at the 2010 Summer Youth Olympics
- Dominican Republic at the 2014 Summer Youth Olympics
- Dominican Republic at the 2011 Parapan American Games
- Dominican Republic at the 2014 FEI World Equestrian Games
- Dominican Republic at the 2015 Summer Universiade

== Economy and infrastructure of the Dominican Republic ==
Economy of the Dominican Republic

- Agriculture in the Dominican Republic
  - Coffee production in the Dominican Republic
  - Irrigation in the Dominican Republic
- Banking in the Dominican Republic
  - Banks in the Dominican Republic
    - Central Bank of the Dominican Republic
- Economic rank, by nominal GDP (2007): 76th (seventy-sixth)
- Communications in the Dominican Republic
  - Media in the Dominican Republic
    - Newspapers in the Dominican Republic
      - Dominican Today
  - Dominican Postal Institute – provides postal service and email
  - Telecommunications in the Dominican Republic
    - Internet in the Dominican Republic
    - Telephone numbers in the Dominican Republic
- Companies of the Dominican Republic
- Banks of the Dominican Republic
- Currency of the Dominican Republic: Peso
  - ISO 4217: DOP
- Energy in the Dominican Republic
  - Electricity sector in the Dominican Republic
    - List of dams and reservoirs in Dominican Republic
- Tourism in the Dominican Republic
- Water supply and sanitation in the Dominican Republic
  - Irrigation in the Dominican Republic
  - Water resources management in the Dominican Republic
    - Dams and reservoirs in Dominican Republic

=== Transport in the Dominican Republic ===
- Transport in the Dominican Republic
  - Air transport in the Dominican Republic
  - Airlines of the Dominican Republic
    - Defunct airlines of Dominican Republic
  - Airports in the Dominican Republic
    - Azua Dominican Field
    - Busiest airports in Dominican Republic
  - Rail transport in the Dominican Republic
  - Vehicular transport in the Dominican Republic
    - Roads in the Dominican Republic
      - Highways and routes in the Dominican Republic

== Education in the Dominican Republic ==
Education in the Dominican Republic

- Schools in the Dominican Republic
- Universities in the Dominican Republic
  - Dominican Adventist University
- Museums in the Dominican Republic

== Health in the Dominican Republic ==
- HIV/AIDS in the Dominican Republic
- Hospitals in the Dominican Republic
  - Hospital General de la Plaza de la Salud
  - Hospital Metropolitano de Santiago
  - Hospital San Nicolás de Bari

== See also ==
- List of international rankings
- Outline of geography
- Outline of North America
