= Human trafficking in the Dominican Republic =

Projection map of the Dominican Republic

Human trafficking in the Dominican Republic is the third largest international crime enterprise in the Caribbean, generating 9.5 billion U.S. dollars annually. The large population of undocumented or stateless persons of Haitian descent in the country is particularly vulnerable to trafficking. Women and children have been reportedly subjected to forced sex in the country and throughout the Caribbean, Europe, South America, and the United States. Women from other countries are also brought to the Dominican Republic for prostitution, and an unknown number may have subsequently become trafficking victims, even if they came voluntarily at first.

The Dominican Republic ratified the 2000 UN TIP Protocol in February 2008.

The U.S. State Department's Office to Monitor and Combat Trafficking in Persons placed the country in "Tier 2" in 2017. The country was placed on the Tier 2 Watch List in 2023.

In 2023, the Organised Crime Index noted that most victims came from Venezuela, Haiti and Colombia.

== History ==
Trafficking routes of women, children and men

The United Nations defines trafficking as "the recruitment, transportation, transfer, harboring, or receipt of persons, by means of the threat or use of force or other forms of coercion, of abduction, of fraud, of deception, of the abuse of power or of a position of vulnerability, or of the giving or receiving of payments or benefits to achieve the consent of a person having control over another person, for the purpose of exploitation." Men and women have been subjected to sex forced labor in the United States and Argentina. Most trafficked victims are sent to Western Europe, and some are sent to North America. Out of all areas in the Caribbean, the Dominican Republic has the highest number of trafficked persons; women are trafficked to Costa Rica and Panama as well as to Western Europe. There are over one thousand commercial sex workers from the island in Spain and 3,675 in Switzerland.

While the Ministry of Labor reported that sugar plantations no longer use child labor, the sugar industry has been cited as vulnerable for possible use of forced labor. A 2009 NGO study found of some 500 male Haitian construction workers interviewed, 21 percent reported experiencing forced labor in the Dominican Republic at some point, although not in their current jobs as construction workers. However, the December 2014 List of Goods Produced by Child Labor or Forced Labor reported 5 agricultural goods produced under such working conditions in the Dominican Republic, all of them involving child labor and one involving both child labor and forced labor. Street children and undocumented or stateless Haitian people – including the Dominican-born children and grandchildren of Haitian migrants – were vulnerable groups to trafficking. Child sex tourism is a problem, particularly in coastal resort areas, with child sex tourists arriving year-round from various countries.

The Government of the Dominican Republic does not fully comply with the minimum standards for the elimination of trafficking and is not making significant efforts to do so. The government has not convicted any trafficking offenders, including officials possibly complicit in trafficking, since 2007. Results in the areas of victim protection, and trafficking prevention were also limited.

Unemployment, poverty, illiteracy, history of abuse, drug use, and gang membership are all individual causes of rising human trafficking within the Caribbean. Oftentimes, traffickers will work along the border between Haiti and the Dominican Republic and trick fathers and mothers into letting their children leave, resulting in the exploitation of their children. There are external and global factors as well, some of which include the global demand for domestic servants, agricultural workers, and factory labor; political, social, or economic crises; natural disasters, the machismo attitude which causes men to discriminate against the female gender, public corruption, lack of government interest, and the limited economic opportunities. Most trafficked individuals often are never able to pay off their remittances which equates to about an estimated amount of 325 billion U.S. dollars; resulting in a lack of development to his or her said country.

More specifically, in the Dominican Republic, 38% of the 784 Dominican and Haitian children questioned worked in the agricultural sector, as domestic workers in family homes and other informal activities such as street selling. Most children work six or seven days a week because they are required to take care of themselves.

Two groups that are currently of specific concern are irregular migrants and deportees. Irregular migrants are those that move illegally across borders, those who enter a country legally but then stay beyond the limits of his or her visas, and people whose residency or citizenship status is modified because of changes in laws and regulations. Irregular migrants often enter into a vulnerable state where they suffer from both physical and emotional abuse. They do not want to leave the country and so suffer extortion and exploitation as a result. Many are promised that they will gain employment and then are sold by trafficking gangs.

It is difficult to deduce the exact impact of trafficking or the number of women and children who have been affected because of circumstances such as violence, abuse, coercion, trauma and stigma associated with being a victim of trafficking. The language barrier can sometimes be a problem; especially when some words in the English language are not in the Spanish vocabulary. Another reason why it is difficult to obtain an exact number of people who are being trafficked is because there are no registers or indicators, no legal processes on the matter, and there are seldom complaints and reports of this type of offense.

== Legal and government responses ==
Dominican law prohibits all forms of trafficking through its comprehensive anti-trafficking Law 137-03, which prescribes penalties of up to 20 years’ imprisonment. The government reported 36 persons “currently in preventive detention” under Law 137-03, but these data conflate trafficking and smuggling, as Law 137-03 covers both. Authorities reported the government may prosecute trafficking offenders under other statutes; NGO observers have said corruption on the part of authorities is a problem. The government reported it provided training for officials posted abroad on identifying and assisting trafficking victims, and each year, judges take an online course on trafficking, available through the National Magistrates School. The government has claimed to have made several efforts to identify and protect trafficking victims, but results were limited. The government has not clarified whether it has a formal mechanism to guide officials in proactively identifying victims among vulnerable groups and refer them to available services offered by NGOs. The government provided $13,500 in support for an NGO-run shelter and religious order that assisted adult, female victims.

A government agency, which is reportedly underfunded, managed shelters for children that assisted child trafficking victims during the reporting period. While the government did not provide formal long-term reintegration assistance programs for trafficking victims, the First Lady’s office facilitated victims’ access to psychological and financial support, and another government agency offered skills training to some victims during the reporting period. The Dominican government claimed to have encouraged victims to assist with the investigation and prosecution of their traffickers, but few elected to do so. Another NGO reported an instance where several victims were willing to assist with a prosecution but claimed there had been no progress in four years. Some officials and an NGO reported some alleged trafficking offenders made deals to compensate victims in lieu of criminal prosecution.

The government did not implement a national public awareness campaign during the reporting period, though there were several campaigns on raising anti-trafficking awareness targeted toward at-risk populations and tourist areas. A national interagency anti-trafficking commission chaired by the Ministry of Foreign Affairs facilitated inter-agency cooperation and oversaw implementation of a national action plan, which remained reliant on donor funding but was hampered by lack of participation of the prosecution service. The government did not undertake efforts to reduce the demand for commercial sex acts during the reporting period. Since 2001, the U.S. government has given over four hundred million dollars in foreign assistance to help combat and eliminate human trafficking and the U.S. government has funded 42 task forces on human trafficking between 2004 and 2006. However, on July 16, 2012, the Dominican Republic signed three agreements dealing with human trafficking within the United States.

The Victims of Trafficking and Violence Protection Act was enacted by the United States in 2000 and was created to establish minimum standards to combat human trafficking applicable to countries that have significant trafficking problems. The Secretary of State was to provide reports each year about countries that do not follow the minimum standards for eliminating trafficking. Each country is part of a Tier group; 1-3 with 3 being the worst. The Trafficking Victims Protection Reauthorization Act of 2003 was created much like the VTVPA however it also addressed the top countries to be keeping a close eye on. The William Wilberforce Trafficking Victims Reauthorization Act of 2008 gave more freedom to monitor and evaluate all assistance given under the previous laws. Other countries were also required to undergo inspections in critical areas where trafficking is most likely. Lastly, there also need to be better indicators for human trafficking. Data needs to describe the international population movements and provide governments with a solid basis for policy formulation and implementation. One of the greatest needs is to provide technical and financial assistance to developing countries in order to enable them to collect better migration data.

== Results of human trafficking in the Caribbean ==
There are many economic, societal, health, and other impacts on human trafficking.

=== Economic impacts ===
Trafficking results in a transfer of money to developing countries because the trafficked individuals have to pay off the debt that he or she has for being trafficked.

=== Societal impacts ===
Trafficking reduces extended family ties and the forced absence of females leads to a breakdown of families and neglect of children and the elderly members of the family. The victims of trafficking are often ignored and shunned once he or she returns to the community and then this individual gets involved with criminal activity. Children who are trafficked are seen as forever damaged and these children suffer from trauma and psychological problems.

=== Health impacts ===
Transporting individuals can result in injury and for some even death before he or she reaches their intended destination. Certain diseases can be a result because the transportation devices are overcrowded and unsanitary. Many individuals who are trafficked for the sex industry may also develop HIV and other sexually transmitted diseases; many times the victims are not given the option to use condoms.

=== Miscellaneous impacts ===
Women and children are the main vulnerable groups of exploitation. These people who are trafficked no longer have human rights; these people lose the right and opportunity to grow up in a protected environment. These people also lose the right to healthcare, education, work, and other freedoms. Many governments are unable to protect women and children who are kidnapped and many government officials are bribed by the traffickers and therefore cannot combat against the rugs human trafficking.
