= Dominican Republic national team =

Dominican Republic national team may refer to:

- Dominican Republic national badminton team
- Dominican Republic national baseball team
- Dominican Republic men's national basketball team
- Dominican Republic national football team
- Dominican Republic national rugby union team
- Dominican Republic national tennis team
