= 2016 Rugby Americas North Championship =

- Date: 5 March – 1 October
- Countries: Bahamas; Barbados; Bermuda; Cayman Islands; Guyana; Jamaica; Mexico; Saint Vincent and the Grenadines; Trinidad and Tobago

Final positions
- Champions: Mexico (1st title)

Tournament statistics
- Matches played: 13
- Tries scored: 93 (7.15 per match)
- Top scorer(s): (Mexico) Agustín Sánchez (53)
- Most tries: (Mexico) Christian Henning (6)
- Website: www.rugbyamericasnorth.com

The 2016 Rugby Americas North Championship, the ninth edition of NACRA Rugby Championship, is a rugby union championship for Tier 3 North American and Caribbean teams. Pool play takes place between 3 March and 2 July. Unlike the 2015 edition of the tournament, teams are split into North and South zones, but not Championships and Cups. As this edition of the tournament doubles as a round of qualification for the 2019 Rugby World Cup, only full members of World Rugby will compete.

== Teams ==
Nine teams will participate in the 2016 tournament.

North Zone	South Zone
Bahamas	Barbados
Bermuda	Guyana
Cayman Islands	Trinidad and Tobago
Mexico	Qualifier winner
Qualifier
Saint Vincent and the Grenadines	Jamaica

Notable changes from last year: Jamaica returns to participate in the qualifier. Saint Lucia, British Virgin Islands, Curacao, Turks and Caicos Islands and USA South are not participating, as they are not full members of World Rugby

== Qualifier ==
March 5, 2016	Saint Vincent and the Grenadines	0–48	Jamaica	Arnos Vale Stadium, Arnos Vale, St. Vincent and the Grenadines
		report	Try: Grayson (2); Smith; Thomas; Groves; Miller; Richards; Creary; Con: Groves (3); Scott; Cards: Hylton (yellow card) 62' to 72'	Attendance: 1,000; Referee: (Wales) Nigel Owens

== North Zone ==
Rank	Team	Games				Points			Try Bonus	Losing Bonus	Table Points
Rank	Team	Played	Won	Drawn	Lost	For	Against	Diff	Try Bonus	Losing Bonus	Table Points
1	Mexico (56)	3	3	0	0	148	37	+111	3	0	15
2	Cayman Islands (61)	3	2	0	1	91	53	+38	1	0	9
3	Bermuda (67)	3	1	0	2	51	135	-84	1	0	5
4	Bahamas (86)	3	0	0	3	24	89	-65	0	0	0

Pre-tournament World Rugby Rankings in parentheses.

Games

7 May 2016	Bahamas	3-39	Mexico	Winton Rugby Field, Nassau, Bahamas
	Pen: Brian Baker (1/2) 42'; Cards: Arman Carlos (yellow card) 76' to 80'	report match center	Try: Fharid Samano 33'; Rodrigo Marquez 48'; Jose Reyes 60'; Roberto Calderón 66'; Miguel Carner 83'; Con: Agustin Sanchez (4/5) 34', 49', 61', 67'; Pen: Agustin Sanchez (2/2) 54', 64'

21 May 2016	Cayman Islands	20-8	Bahamas	Truman Bodden Sports Complex, George Town, Cayman Islands
	Try: Venasio Tokatokauanua 10'; Andre Ormond 38'; Justin Wight 43'; Con: Shaun McDermott (1/3) 10'; Pen: Shaun McDermott (1/2) 30'; Cards: Yohann Regnard (yellow card) 54' to 64'; Chris Kennedy (yellow card) 60' to 70'; Paul Westin (yellow card) 71' to 80'	Report; Match Center	Try: Mark Hammerton 51'; Con: Brian Baker (0/1); Pen: Brian Baker 63'; Cards: Patrick Arthur (yellow card) 54' to 64'; Joshua Feaster (yellow card) 79' to 80'	Attendance: 1,050; Referee: (Bermuda) Jamie Baum

21 May 2016	Mexico	75-10	Bermuda	Universidad Iberoamericana, Mexico City
	Try: Rodrigo Márquez 9'c, 59'; Christian Henning 22'c, 32'c, 44'c, 52'c Luis Arredondo 36'c Andres Rodriguez 46'c Gonzalo Pons 43'c, 79'c Simon Pierre 73'c Con: Agustin Sanchez 10', 24', 33', 37', 45', 47', 53', 55', 74', 80'		Try: Thomas Edwards 15'c Con: Dan Cole 16'; Pen: Thomas Edwards 5'	Attendance: 450; Referee: (Canada) Harry Mason

4 June 2016	Bermuda	30-13	Bahamas	National Sports Center Hamilton, Bermuda
	Try: Nigel Burgess (2); Antonio Perinchief; Bennet Gibson; Con: Thomas Edwards (2); Pen: Thomas Edwards (2)	report	Try: Ryan Knowles; Andrew Kemp; Pen: Brian Baker

18 June 2016	Cayman Islands	47-11	Bermuda	Truman Bodden Sports Complex, George Town, Cayman Islands
	Try: Al Lum 6'; Michael Wilson 16', 26'; Paul Westin 28'; Venasio Tokatokauanua 41'; Justin Wight 56'; Peter de Vere 74'; Con: Morgan Shelver (5/6) 7', 17', 27', 29', 57'; Shaun McDermott (1/1) 74'; Pen: Morgan Shelver (0/1); Cards: Severiano Tabuaniwere (yellow card) 48' to 58'	ARN report World Rugby report	Try: Guerhardt Lamprecht 76'; Con: Thomas Edwards (0/1); Pen: Thomas Edwards (2/2) 13', 20'	Attendance: 1,100; Referee: (United States) Miles McIvor

2 July 2016	Mexico	34-24	Cayman Islands	Campo De Rugby, Dos Ríos, Mexico
	Try: Gonzalo Pons 11', 29'; Fharid Samano 16'; Christian Henning 22'; Luis Arrendondo 53'; Con: Agustín Sánchez (3/5) 17', 30', 54'; Pen: Agustín Sánchez (1/2) 3'; Cards: José Reyes (yellow card) 64' to 74'	report	Try: Michael Wilson 5', 61'; Paul Westin 76'; Con: Shaun McDermott (3/3) 6', 62', 77'; Pen: Shaun McDermott (1/1) 47'	Attendance: 650; Referee: (United States) Shaun Bastic

== South Zone ==
Rank	Team	Games				Points			Try Bonus	Losing Bonus	Table Points
Rank	Team	Played	Won	Drawn	Lost	For	Against	Diff	Try Bonus	Losing Bonus	Table Points
1	Guyana (54)	3	3	0	0	96	38	+58	2	0	14
2	Trinidad and Tobago (44)	3	2	0	1	91	42	+49	2	1	11
3	Barbados (75)	3	1	0	2	22	87	-65	0	0	4
4	Jamaica (78)	3	0	0	3	17	59	-42	0	0	0

Pre-tournament World Rugby Rankings in parentheses.

Games

23 April 2016	Guyana	48-17	Barbados	Providence National Stadium, Georgetown
	Try: Avery Corbin 9', 32'c, 42'c Rickford Cummings 24'c Dwayne Schroeder 39'c Lancelot Adonis 63'c Dane Parks 74'; Con: Ryan Gonsalvez (5/7); Pen: Ryan Gonsalvez 6'; Cards: Rickford Cummings (yellow card) 82' to 83'		Try: Faggiani 29', 47'; Clarke 69'; Con: Carter (1/3)	Referee: (United States) Haylee Slaughter

23 April 2016	Trinidad and Tobago	34-14	Jamaica	Ato Boldon Stadium, Couva
	Try: Joseph Quashie 16', 48'c Omari Doyle 18'; Adam Frederick 22'; Leon Pantor 40'c Kieshon Walker 80'; Con: Leon Pantor (1/4) 48'; Johnasson Alleyne (1/2) 40'		Try: Antonio Baker 72'c Orien Smith 75'c Con: Hylton 73'; Thomas 75'; Pen: Thomas (0/2); Cards: Grayson (yellow card) 36' to 46'	Referee: (Mexico) Jorge Rodriguez

21 May 2016	Barbados	5-39	Trinidad and Tobago	Garrison Savannah Racetrack, Bridgetown
	Try: Millar 75'; Con: Walcott (0/1); Pen: Carter (0/3)	match center	Try: Silverthorn 3', 23', 43', 68'; Phillip 18', 53'; Joseph 80'; Con: Guerra (1/5) 24'; Hudson (0/1); Clark (1/1) 81'	Referee: (United States) John Stevens

21 May 2016	Guyana	23-5	Jamaica	National Park Rugby Field, Georgetown
	Try: Adonis 39'; Mayers 42'; King 51', 75'; Con: Gonsalves (0/3); Broomes (0/1); Pen: Gonsalves 33'	report match center	Try: Miller 3'; Con: Lynch (0/1); Cards: Grayson (yellow card) 47' to 57'; Daley (yellow card) 63' to 73'	Referee: (Canada) Michael Jones

18 June 2016	Barbados	walkover	Jamaica
				Referee: (Mexico) Antonio Magallanes

18 June 2016	Trinidad and Tobago	18-23	Guyana	Hasely Crawford Stadium, Port of Spain
	Try: Phillip 39'; Frederick 49'; Richards 60'; Con: O'Connor (0/2); Guerra (0/1); Pen: Pantor (1/2) 68'; Cards: Silverthorn (yellow card) 72' to 80'; Hill (yellow card) 78' to 80'	report Match Center	Try: K. McKenzie 19'; Butts 43'; O. McKenzie 79'; Con: Adonis (2/3) 44', 80'; Pen: Gonsalves (1/1) 6'; Cards: Staglon (yellow card) 79' to 80'	Referee: (Cayman Islands) David Sherwin

== Championship playoff ==
1 October 2016	Mexico	32-3	Guyana	Estadio Roberto "Tapatio" Mendez, Mexico City
14:00	Try: C. Henning 35'; M. Loredo 60'; A. Rodríguez 64'; Y. Suro 79'; Con: A. Sanchez 36', 61'; M. Carner 78'; Pen: A. Sanchez 22', 49'	Report	Pen: R. Gonzalves 2'; Cards: R. Cummings (yellow card) 48' to 58'	Referee: (United States) Jim Rogers

== See also ==
- 2019 Rugby World Cup – Americas qualification
