= Rugby union in the Turks and Caicos Islands =

Sports federation

- Country: Turks and Caicos Islands
- Governing body: Turks and Caicos Islands Rugby Football Union
- National team(s): Turks and Caicos Islands

Rugby union in the Turks and Caicos Islands is a minor, but growing sport.

== Governing body ==
The Turks and Caicos Islands Rugby Football Union is currently affiliated to NACRA (formerly NAWIRA), but not IRB.

== History ==
Rugby in the Turks and Caicos Islands began in the early 1990s on Providenciale's old playing field. Due to the harsh nature of the terrain, and the lack of grass pitches, it was limited to touch rugby.

Touring parties were created and travelled first to Tamarac Florida and then on to the Dominican Republic and the Caribbean Sevens in Trinidad where they won the award for the most sociable team.

The TCIRFU was formed in 2001 and continues to grow through tours to Cuba, the Bahamas and the United States.

The Conch Cup is a regular home and away tournament held with the Bahamas national rugby union team.

== See also ==
- Turks and Caicos Islands national rugby union team
- Turks and Caicos Islands Rugby Football Union
