= Prostitution in Haiti =

Prostitution in Haiti, although illegal, continues to be a widespread problem for the country, particularly in the form of street prostitution (notably in the Pétion-Ville area of Port-au-Prince), as well as in bars, hotels and brothels. UNAIDS estimate there to be 70,000 prostitutes in the country. Law enforcement is generally lax. Haiti suffers from extreme poverty, with much of the population living on less than a dollar a day; those with no other resources often turn to prostitution.

After the 2010 earthquake, many prostitutes from the Dominican Republic crossed over the border, searching out clients amongst the aid workers and UN personal. Dominican women command a premium because of their lighter skin.

The country used to be a premier destination in the 1970s for sex tourism for adults, including gay men. Sex tourism declined because of HIV fears but has returned, including child sex tourism.

In addition to prostitution, Haiti faces challenges related to sex trafficking, with victims experiencing exploration within the country as well as through cross-border movement. Women, girls, restavek children, migrants, and other socially marginalized groups face heighten vulnerability due to poverty, displacement, and weak legal protections. Government efforts to address trafficking remain limited, hindered by resource shortages, corruption, and widespread gang control that restricts law enforcement activity and victim protection.

== Allegations of sexual misconduct by UN and Oxfam staff ==
=== UN Peacekeeping Mission ===
Several hundred Sri Lankan troops, part of the UN mission, were expelled from the country in 2007. They were involved in trafficking Haitian girls to Sri Lanka and also being involved in child prostitution locally.

It was reported in 2010 that trafficked Dominican women had been found in brothels allegedly frequented by UN personnel.

In 2015 the UN reported that between 2008 and 2014, members of its peacekeeping mission had sexually abused more than 225 Haitian women in exchange for food, medication, and other items.

The UN has a zero-tolerance policy towards its personnel visiting the local sex trade, but this is virtually unenforceable.

As in other countries with a strong UN (or, for the case, other international organizations) presence, the combination of factors (local population in conditions of extreme poverty and the presence of foreign, well paid personnel, most of them away from their families) favor prostitution.

=== Oxfam ===
In February 2018 an investigation by The Times newspaper found that Oxfam allowed three men to resign and sacked four for gross misconduct after an inquiry concerning sexual exploitation, the downloading of pornography, bullying and intimidation. A confidential report produced by Oxfam in 2011 found that there had been “a culture of impunity” among some staff in Haiti and concluded that 'it cannot be ruled out that any of the prostitutes were under-aged'. Among the staff who were permitted to resign was the charity's Belgian country director, Roland Van Hauwermeiren. According to the internal report, Van Hauwermeiren admitted using prostitutes at a villa whose rent was paid for by Oxfam with charitable funds. Oxfam's chief executive at the time, Dame Barbara Stocking, offered Hauwermeiren “a phased and dignified exit” because of concern that sacking him risked “potentially serious implications” for the charity's work and reputation.

Oxfam did not report any of the incidents to the Haitian authorities, on the grounds that “it was extremely unlikely that any action would be taken”. Although Oxfam disclosed details of the incident to the Charity Commission, following the investigation by The Times the Commission revealed that it had never received the final investigation report and Oxfam “did not detail the precise allegations, nor did it make any indication of potential sexual crimes involving minors”. In light of the information revealed by The Times, a spokesperson for the Commission commented that: "We will expect the charity to provide us with assurance that it has learnt lessons from past incidents".

In response to the revelations, Liz Truss, the chief secretary to the Treasury, described the reports as “shocking, sickening and depressing”. Following the publication of the Times' report, Oxfam issued a statement in which it asserted "Oxfam treats any allegation of misconduct extremely seriously. As soon as we became aware of a range of allegations — including of sexual misconduct — in Haiti in 2011 we launched an internal investigation. The investigation was announced publicly and staff members were suspended pending the outcome.” The statement also added that the allegations “that under-age girls may have been involved were not proven”. Speaking on the BBC's Andrew Marr Show, the international development secretary, Penny Mordaunt, said Oxfam had failed in its "moral leadership" over the "scandal". Mordaunt also said that Oxfam did "absolutely the wrong thing" by not reporting the detail of the allegations to the government.

== HIV ==
Haiti has the highest cases of HIV/AIDS in the Caribbean region estimated to be at about a 1.8 percent prevalence as of 2013. An analysis of the causes of death, which started when hospital death certificates began to be collected in 1997, shows that AIDS was the leading cause of death in the country, but as of 2010, this has been reduced to only a 1 percent cause of death, as disaster-related issues has been the leading cause at 66 percent.

== Sex trafficking ==
According to the US Department of State, Haiti is a source, transit and destination country for human trafficking. Women and children, particularly from Venezuela and the Dominican Republic are trafficked into the country for Forced prostitution.

Haiti has not sufficiently prosecuted traffickers or taken steps to prevent Haitians or Haitian immigrants from facing human trafficking. As a result, the United States Department of State Office to Monitor and Combat Trafficking in Persons ranks Haiti as a 'Tier 2 Watch List' country. The country also faces little support from its neighboring countries, as relations with the Dominican Republic remain tense. The Dominican Republic has enforced strict deportation laws, with over 250,000 Haitians being deported in 2023. The UN has criticized these actions as they are forcing migrants into unsafe and unstable environments.

=== Targeted Groups ===
Research in Haiti reveals specific groups that are impacted by the risk associated with sex trafficking more than others. Among these groups, the greatest risk by far are women and girls, in particular the poor, and those with limited or disrupted schooling, lack of steady families or who are displaced. There are reports from international agencies stating that at greatest risk are young girls in the early mid teens to late teenage years in zones where there are broken families and disrupted social order. These conditions of social abandonment strengthen the predatory role of traffickers who selectively target the unprotected and the impoverished. Reports from Amnesty International, a human rights organization, further highlight how children, especially adolescent girls in gang-controlled areas, face acute risks of sexual exploitation and coercion. Testimonies from affected minors show how poverty, hunger, and the absence of state protection heighten their vulnerability. A 16-year-old girl described being forced into commercial sex to survive, saying, “I don’t have a choice… They see you and say, ‘Let’s go.’ If you refuse, they hit you with a gun.”

These patterns of vulnerability are even more pronounced within the restavek system, where children face structural conditions that make exploitation more likely. Thehe restavek system includes rural children who are sent to different households within the system. Abuse, undereducation, and complete disregard for a child are common within the restaveksystem. These are all the more neglectful when it comes to children performing [domestic] servitude and who are kept away from their families. Roughly between 150,000 and 300,000 children within the system, a considerable portion of which are minors or girls. Their youth and the fact that there are insufficient guardians increases the rate in which they are placed in situations where trafficking for labor and sexual exploitation will occur.

Gender and age bias shape who gets targeted and how exploitation unfolds and is documented for adolescent girls as the majority of the affected group. Boys in various communities may encounter other forms of exploitation, such as being pressured into activities with armed groups or informal labor networks. A 12-year-old boy explained that gang members forced him to serve as an informant, saying, “If I didn’t do it, they would have killed me.” These overlapping pressures of poverty, displacement, gender inequality, and weak legal protections shape the social context in which these patterns of sex trafficking occur. These patterns must be understood in these various intersections. Age ranges, gender patterns, and affected minority groups to formulate interventions that safeguard those impacted the most while countering the root determinants of trafficking.

=== Government Anti-Trafficking Measures ===
Haiti continues to use its 2014 Anti-Trafficking Law as its primary legal framework to address sex and labor trafficking with penalties of 7 to 15 years, and the penalties are higher when the victim is a child. Similar sentences may be imposed on those obtaining, or attempting to obtain, sexual services from a victim of trafficking. In 2023, trafficking proceeds were also legally classified as money laundering. Key institutions involved in anti-trafficking efforts include the National Committee for the Fight Against Human Trafficking, the Haitian National Police, and the Brigade for the Protection of Minors. Organizations work to identify victims, initiate investigations, and refer cases to the judicial system. The government produces awareness material, maintains several hotlines, and screens vulnerable emigrants at official border points. Haiti's government has limited resources, relies on NGOs, and has restricted access controlled by armed groups when it comes to human trafficking.

==== Implementation Challenges ====
Corruption and official complicity remain significant concerns. Ministry of Justice employees have contributed to stalling cases, and judicial officials have accepted bribes, released traffickers, and interfered in cases involving sexual abuse. Police and immigration officials at the Haiti-Dominican Republic border are also reported to participate in trafficking-related corruptions and accept payments to release detained suspects. The government does not report any investigations or prosecutions of officials for trafficking related complicity. Dr. Najat Maalla M’jid, the UN Special Representative on Violence Against Children, emphasized that “conviction for trafficking in children remain low and perpetrator[s] continue to enjoy impunity, corruption, stigma, fear and the lack of protection, [which] limits children's ability to report and seek justice.”

Widespread gang violence impedes efforts to address trafficking. Armed groups control areas that authorities cannot safely enter, limiting investigation, victim identification, and service provision. Survivor accounts from neighborhoods such as Brooklyn describe killings, sexual violence, and family separation during gang attacks, illustrating the severe dangers residents face when navigating these areas and how such conditions intensify vulnerability to trafficking. Gangs damage infrastructure like courthouses, which result in postponed hearings, stalled prosecutions, and reduced judicial capacity. Insecurity contributes to high judicial vacancies and non-functional courts. The escalating conflict has also driven unprecedented displacement, with more than 1.4 million Haitians forced from their homes in 2025, straining already limited services and deepening the vulnerabilities that traffickers exploit. The country's instability also affects migration patterns and increases the vulnerability of Haitians returned across the Dominican Republic land border, where service providers are able to reach only a small portion of the returnee population. Migrants, undocumented individuals, stateless persons, and other at-risk groups face heightened trafficking risks. The government restricts certain charter flights to reduce risks linked to irregular migration routes. These conditions disproportionately affect vulnerable populations including children in gang-controlled areas, migrants, LGBTQ+ individuals, and those in the restavek system.

== See also ==
- Prostitution in the Dominican Republic
