= Turks and Caicos Islands national rugby union team =

Turks and Caicos Islands
- Union: Turks and Caicos Islands Rugby Football Union
- Nickname: The Flamingos
- Emblem: Flamingo
- Founded: 2001
- Ground: Meridian Field

First international
- Dominican Republic 20–10 Turks and Caicos Islands (Santo Domingo, Dominican Republic; 9 February 2002)

Largest win
- Turks and Caicos Islands 63–12 British Virgin Islands (Providenciales, Turks and Caicos; 12 May 2018)

Largest defeat
- Mexico 96–0 Turks and Caicos Islands (Ciudad de Mexico, Mexico; 28 June 2014)

World Cup
- Appearances: 0

The Turks and Caicos Islands national rugby union team represents the Turks and Caicos Islands in rugby union. Although not an official member of World Rugby; they have been competing in the NACRA Rugby Championship since 2013 and are affiliated with NACRA.

== History ==
Before the Turks & Caicos Islands Rugby Football Union was formed in 2001, the Turks & Caicos Islands national rugby union team made frequent tours in the 1990s. They played other teams in the Caribbeans and participated in a few tournaments.

In 2013 they were invited to the 2013 NACRA Rugby Championship. However, they lost to Jamaica 13 – 31.

== Record ==
Below is a table of the representative rugby matches played by a Turks and Caicos national XV at test level up until 6 June 2026, updated after match with Bahamas.

Opponent	Played	Won	Lost	Drawn	% Won
Bahamas	5	1	4	0	20%
Bermuda	1	0	1	0	0%
British Virgin Islands	3	2	1	0	66.67%
Curaçao	1	1	0	0	100%
Dominican Republic	3	2	1	0	66.67%
Jamaica	2	0	2	0	0%
Mexico	1	0	1	0	0%
Total	16	6	10	0	37.5%

== See also ==
- Rugby union in the Turks and Caicos Islands
