= Dominican Rugby Federation =

Fedorugby
Federación Dominicana de Rugby
- Sport: Rugby union
- Founded: 1970s orig. Federation 2004 re-estd. Fedorugby
- NACRA affiliation: 2005 (affiliate member)
- Website: fedorugby.org

The Dominican Rugby Federation, known as Fedorugby — or officially in Spanish: Federación Dominicana de Rugby, is the governing body for rugby union in the Dominican Republic. It was founded on 20 October 2004 and became affiliated to the North America Caribbean Rugby Association (NACRA) in the following year.

Rugby was introduced to the Dominican Republic in 1969 by Jean-Paul Bossuge, a French diplomat. The game began to grow, particularly within the universities, and by the 1970s the original Dominican Rugby Union had been formed with Dr. William Acosta appointed as its inaugural president. Dominican teams began competing in domestic and international tournaments and by the 1980s there were ten active clubs. However, rugby was not officially recognised by the Dominican Olympic Committee and funding for the game was low. Interest waned by the early 1990s.

Dominican Rugby was revived in 1997 with teams being sent to Trinidad and Tobago's rugby sevens tournament from 1997 to 2000. Recognising a need to retain and increase player numbers, Fedorugby was formed in 2004 to bring the Dominican rugby clubs and players together under one organising body.

== National teams ==
The Dominican national sevens team has played in regional competitions such as Trinidad and Tobago's Rugby Sevens tournament. The Dominican 15-a-side team first played against the British Virgin Islands in 2000.

== See also ==
- Rugby union in the Dominican Republic
- Dominican Republic national rugby union team
- Dominican Republic national rugby union team (sevens)
