= List of Dominican Republic records in track cycling =

The following are the national records in track cycling in Dominican Republic maintained by its national cycling federation: Federación Dominicana de Ciclismo.

== Men ==
Event	Record	Athlete	Date	Meet	Place	Ref
Flying 200 m time trial	10.283	Jonatan Ogando	9 February 2013	Pan American Championships	Mexico City, Mexico	
Flying 500 m time trial						
500 m time trial						
Flying 1 km time trial						
1 km time trial						
Team sprint						
4000m individual pursuit						
4000m team pursuit						
Hour record						

== Women ==
Event	Record	Athlete	Date	Meet	Place	Ref
Flying 200 m time trial						
Flying 500 m time trial						
500 m time trial						
Flying 1 km time trial						
1 km time trial						
Team sprint						
3000m individual pursuit						
3000m team pursuit						
Hour record						
