= Hospital Metropolitano de Santiago =

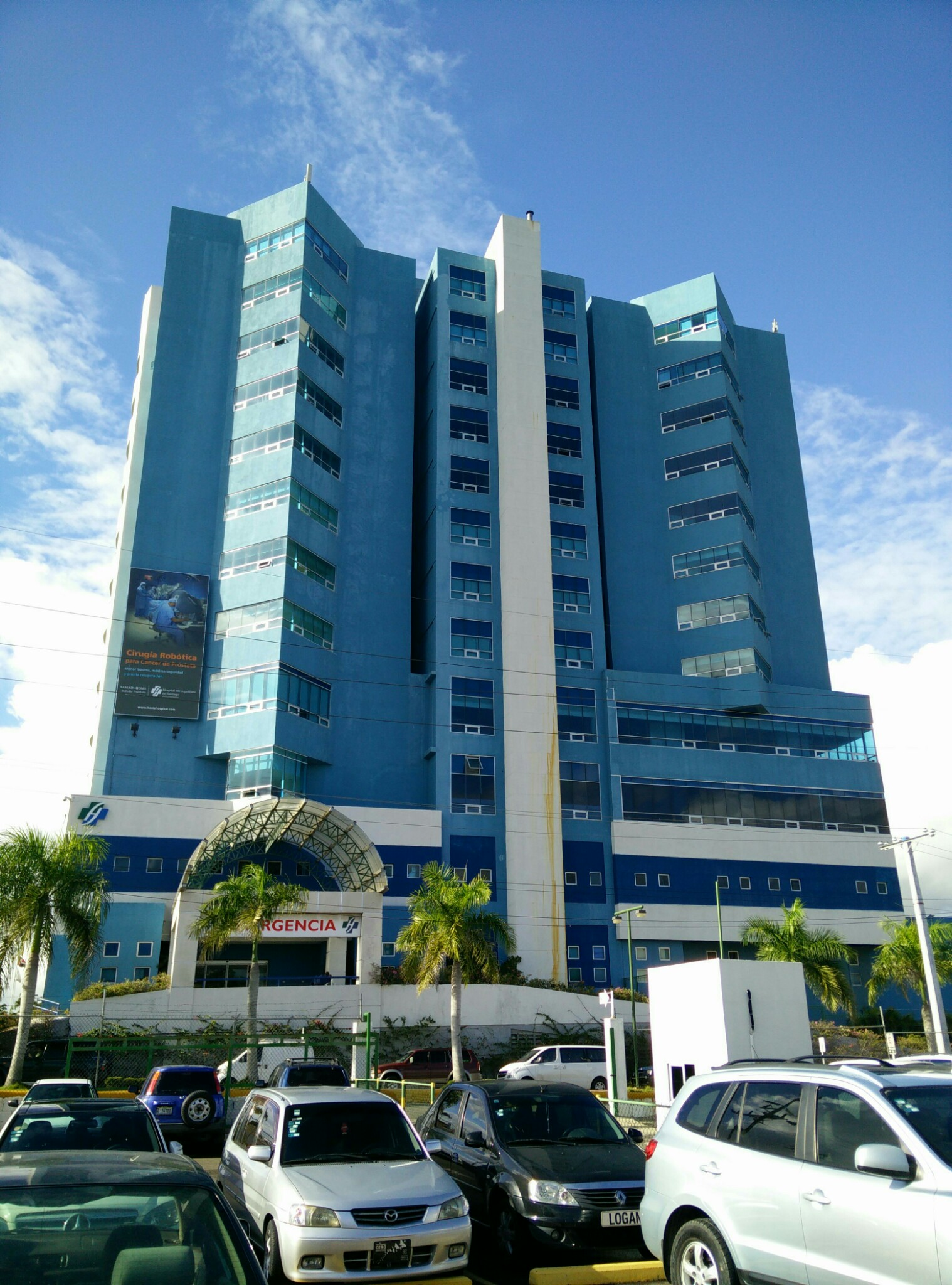
- HOMS South Tower

Geography
- Location: Santiago Province, Dominican Republic
- Coordinates: 19.436414°N 70.661153°W

Services
- Beds: 400

Hospital Metropolitano de Santiago (HOMS) is the largest hospital in the Dominican Republic and one of the most modern hospitals in Latin America and the Caribbean, with 300 doctor's offices, 400 beds, 16 operating rooms, a hotel, and other specialized units.

HOMS not only takes care of the Dominicans’ health but also allows foreigners to have the opportunity to receive high quality health care at low prices in what is called "health tourism". HOMS has an investment of more than $80.0 million US dollars. HOMS will be looking to be accredited by the Join Commission of International Hospital Accreditation.

== History ==
HOMS construction began at the end of the year 1999. The initial promoters of HOMS were: Dr. Rafael Sánchez Español, a very well recognized medical doctor in Santiago; Dr. José Hazim Frappier, former Senator of San Pedro de Macorís who is currently Chancellor of Universidad Central del Este in San Pedro de Macorís, Dominican Republic; Sonia Dillon, Ph.D, a graduate from University of Pittsburgh, Eduardo Estrella, Civil Engineer who created the hospital's Structural design and Ernesto Moquete, Electric Engineer who created the electrical wiring and panels for the hospital.

Julio Rivera created the Architectural design. Both, Estrella and Rivera are part of the firm ECOPE which was in charge of the HOMS construction at that time. The construction of HOMS was paralyzed for three years due to the country suffering economic difficulties during the PRD government headed by Hipólito Mejía. The new PLD government, headed by Leonel Fernández, injected fresh money into this project in 2005. The Dominican government along with several very well known entrepreneurs from the city of Santiago are the major shareholders of this project. These entrepreneurs are: Félix García, Manuel Estrella, Fernando Capellán, Carlos Sully Fondeur, Angel Rosario Viñas, and José Clase, among others. Individually, they are owners of Dominican newspapers, TV stations, Industrial Free Zones and several other businesses.

Dr. Sonia Dillon did the feasibility study for HOMS on August 6, 1999. She is actually a Professor in Health Services Administration at Lake Erie College of Osteopathic Medicine (LECOM). Dr. Dillon is also directing the LECOM-PUCMM exchange international program. LECOM is the nation's largest medical school in the United States with more than 1400 students and has three campuses, two located in Pennsylvania and the other one in Bradenton, Florida.

== See also ==
- Health in the Dominican Republic
