= List of cathedrals in the Dominican Republic =

This is the list of cathedrals in the Dominican Republic sorted by denomination.

== Catholic ==
Dominican Republic have 13 catholic Cathedrals.

Cathedrals of the Catholic Church in the Dominican Republic:

- Cathedral of Santo Domingo: Primate Cathedral of America, officially known as: Holy Metropolitan Cathedral Basilica of Our lady of the Incarnation or Annunciation, also known as Cathedral of Santa Maria la menor. (Spanish: Catedral de Santo Domingo: Catedral Primada de América, nombre oficial: Santa Iglesia Catedral Basilica Metropolitana de Nuestra Señora Santa María de la Encarnación o Anunciación, también conocida como Catedral Santa María la menor), Ciudad Colonial, Santo Domingo
- Catedral Nuestra Señora de Regla, Baní
- Catedral Nuestra Señora del Rosario, Barahona
- Basílica Catedral Nuestra Señora de la Altagracia, Higüey
- Immaculate Conception Cathedral (Spanish: Catedral de la Inmaculada Concepción), La Vega
- Catedral Santa Cruz, Mao
- St. Philip the Apostle Cathedral (Spanish: Catedral San Felipe Apóstol), Puerto Plata
- Santa Ana Cathedral (Spanish: Catedral de Santa Ana), San Francisco de Macorís
- Catedral San Juan Bautista, San Juan de la Maguana
- Catedral San Pedro Apóstol, San Pedro de Macorís
- St. James the Apostle Cathedral (Spanish: Catedral de Santiago Apóstol), Santiago de los Caballeros
- Saint Barbara Military Cathedral, Officially known as: Holy Military Cathedral Church of Saint Barbara of the men of the Sea. Also known as: Church of the Stonemasons. (Spanish: Catedral castrense Santa Bárbara, Nombre oficial: Santa Iglesia Catedral Castrense Santa Bárbara de los hombres de la Mar), también conocida como: Iglesia de los canteros. Ciudad Colonial (Zona Colonial), Santo Domingo, República Dominicana.
- Stella Maris Cathedral, (Spanish: Catedral Stella Maris), Diocese of Stella Maris (Spanish: Diócesis de Stella Maris), Santo Domingo Este, Santo Domingo, República Dominicana.

== Anglican ==
- Catedral de la Epifania/Union Church, Santo Domingo (The Episcopal Church)

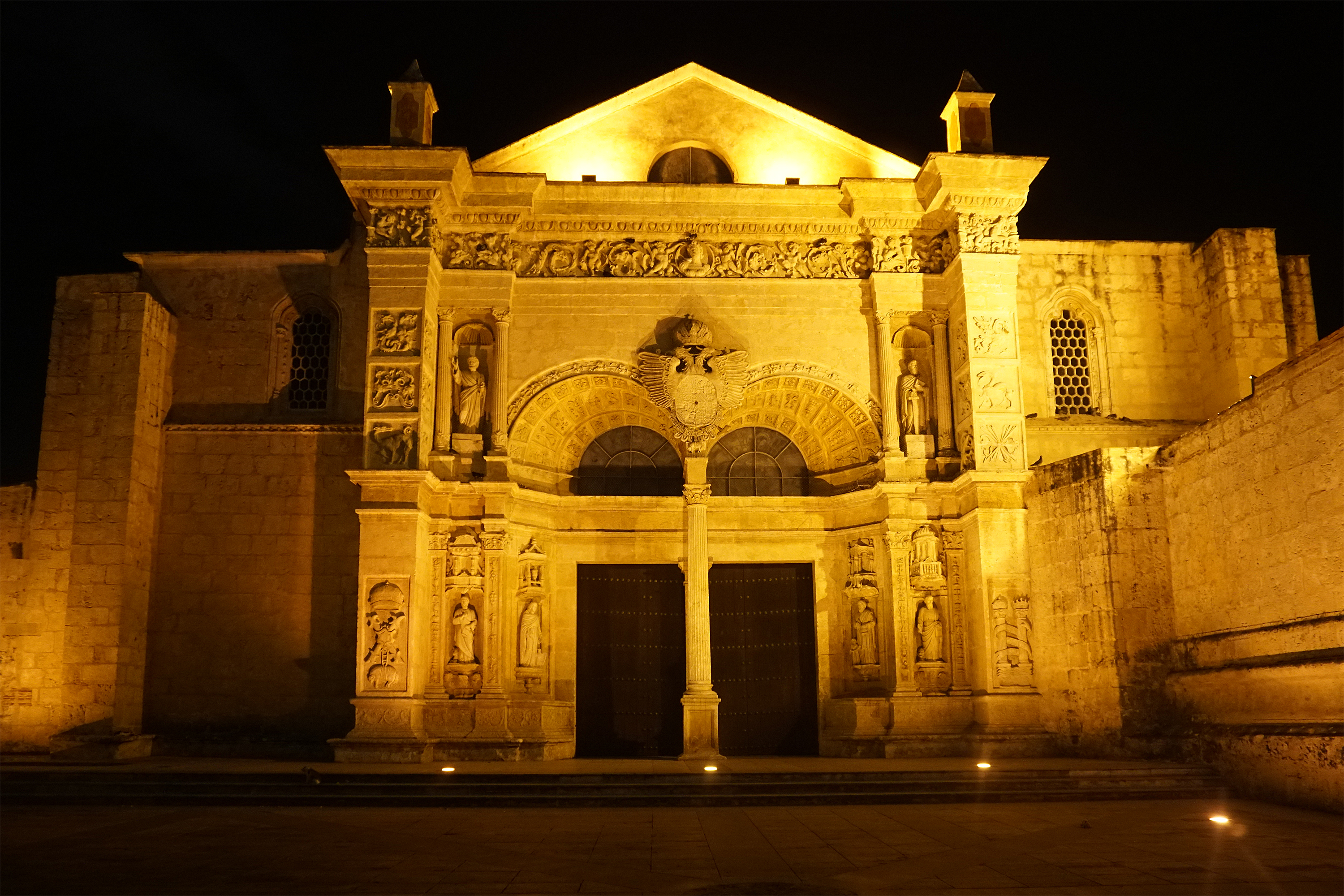
Catedral Primada de América, Ciudad Colonial, Santo Domingo

== See also ==
- Lists of cathedrals
