= Rugby union in the Dominican Republic =

- Country: Dominican Republic
- Governing body: Fedorugby
- National team: Dominican Republic
- First played: 1969
- Clubs: 16

Rugby union in the Dominican Republic is a minor, but growing sport.

== Governing body ==
The governing body is the Dominican Rugby Federation, known as Fedorugby. It is affiliated to NACRA, the regional governing body for rugby within North America and the Caribbean. Fedorugby is not currently a member of World Rugby.

== History ==
Rugby was introduced to the Dominican Republic by French diplomat Jean-Paul Bossuge, vice consul at the time, in 1969. Jean Paul Rugby Club is named after him. Rugby began to grow in the seventies, but went into decline in the early 1990s. As in many other countries, rugby had suffered from lack of Olympic recognition. There was a revival in 1997, and from 1997 to 2000 the Dominican Republic was represented in Trinidad and Tobago's international rugby sevens tournament.

There are rugby clubs in Santo Domingo, San Cristóbal, and La Romana, as well as at San Pedro and Constanza. Rugby is also played in the universities. Santo Domingo has six main clubs: Lions RC, Red Dragons RC, Titanes RC, Pirañas del Caribe RC as well as the university clubs at UNPHU and UASD.

== See also ==
- Dominican Republic national rugby union team
- Dominican Rugby Federation
