= The Birds of Haiti and the Dominican Republic =

Book by Alexander Wetmore

- Author: Alexander Wetmore & Bradshaw H. Swales
- Illustrator: Allan Brooks
- Language: English
- Series: Bulletin of the United States National Museum 155
- Subject: Avifauna of Hispaniola
- Genre: Ornithology
- Publisher: Smithsonian Institution
- Publication date: 1931
- Publication place: United States
- Media type: Print (paperback)
- Pages: 484
- Dewey Decimal: 598.297293

The Birds of Haiti and the Dominican Republic is a book published as no.155 in the zoological monograph series Bulletin of the United States National Museum. It was authored by Alexander Wetmore, with the assistance of Bradshaw H. Swales, and was published by the Smithsonian Institution in Washington DC in 1931. It is in octavo format (248 x 156 mm) and contains iv + 484 pages bound in a grey paper cover. It includes 26 black-and-white plates, both of paintings of the birds by Allan Brooks, and of photographs of the habitat.

The book is an ornithological treatise on the avifauna of the island of Hispaniola (divided between the nations of Haiti and the Dominican Republic) in the Caribbean. It is based on the fieldwork carried out, and collections made, by various expeditions there, especially those of William Louis Abbott, and of Wetmore himself.

The first 57 pages of the book are taken up by accounts of the physiography of the island, the history of ornithological exploration and of fieldwork for the Smithsonian Institution there, as well as a general discussion of the avifauna. This section also contains notes on adjacent islands including Gonave, Tortue, Grande Cayemite, Saona, and Navassa. The rest of the book comprises individual accounts of the bird species recorded from Hispaniola, ending with a comprehensive bibliography and index.
