= Human trafficking in Costa Rica =

Trade of people in Costa Rica

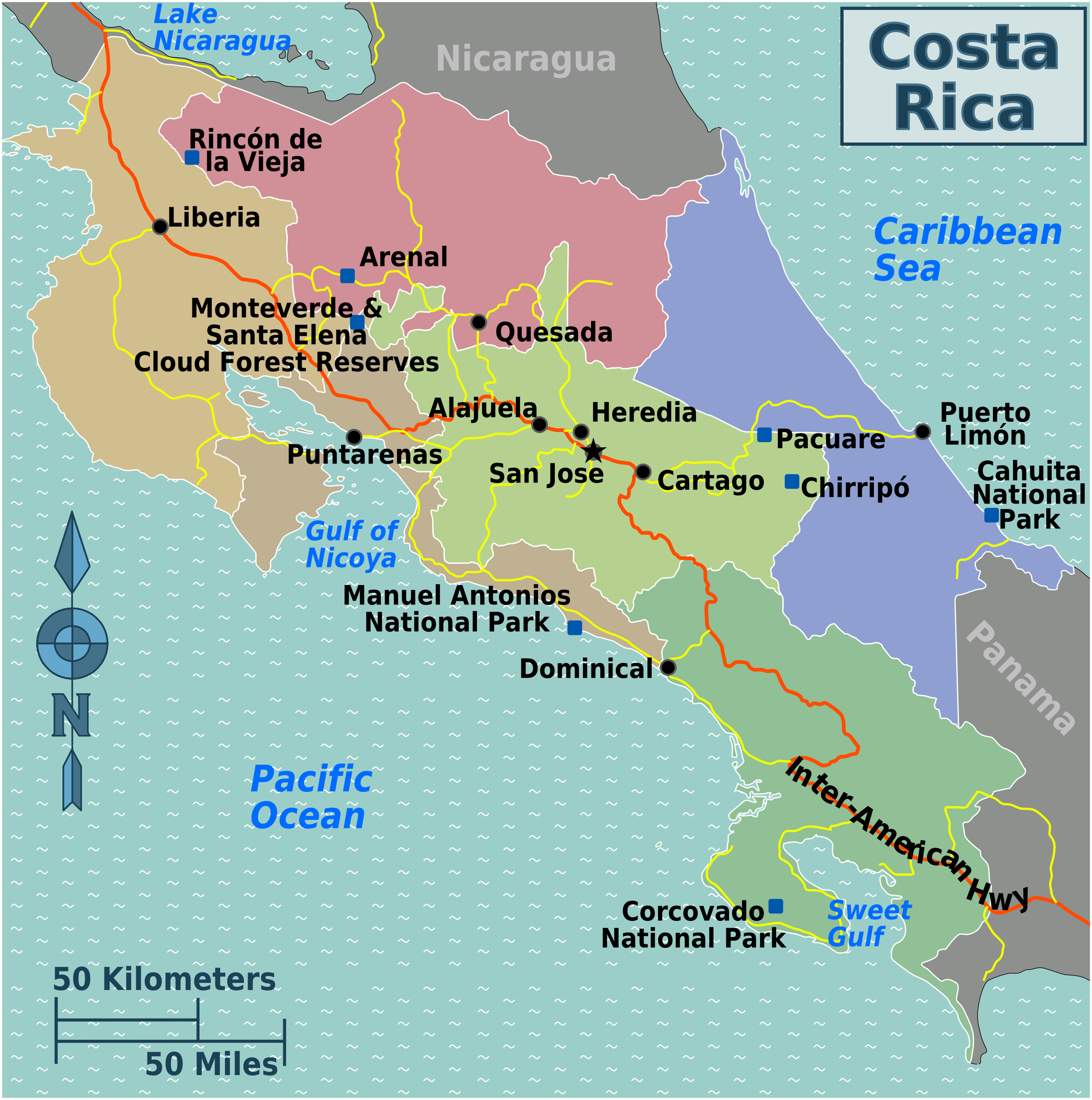
Costa Rica Map

Costa Rica ratified the 2000 UN TIP Protocol in September 2003.

Costa Rica is a source, transit, and destination country for goods and products, a great location for trade in the seas. Costa Rica is surrounded by the Pacific Ocean and the Caribbean Sea making it a source of imports and exports. Costa Rica is approximately 19,653 square miles of land, making it smaller than West Virginia.

To a lesser but increasing extent, in 2018 Costa Rica was a source, transit, and destination country for men, women, and children subjected to conditions of forced labor, particularly in the agriculture, construction, fishing, and domestic service sectors. The economy greatly depends on the exportation of bananas and coffee, making high demands of agriculture work.

In 2010, young men from Nicaragua, Vietnam, China and other Asian countries were subjected to conditions of forced labor in Costa Rica. By 2018 Costa Rican women and children were forced into commercial sexual exploitation due to high rates of poverty and violence. Women and girls from Nicaragua, the Dominican Republic, Guatemala, Colombia, and Panama were identified in as victims of forced prostitution. Child sex tourism was a serious problem, particularly in the provinces of Guanacaste, Limón, Puntarenas, and San José. Child sex tourists arrived mostly from the United States and Europe. Adults have been identified using trafficked women and children to transport and sell drugs. Neighboring countries and cities were victims as well to forced labor many times trafficked to Costa Rica.

In 2018 the Government of Costa Rica did not fully comply with the minimum standards for the elimination of trafficking; however, it made significant efforts to do so. During the previous year, the Government of Costa Rica continued to raise public awareness about human trafficking and trained many government officials, investigated allegations, in addition to maintaining limited victim services. However, the government’s law enforcement efforts lagged with respect to holding trafficking offenders accountable for their crimes and in adequately addressing domestic cases of human trafficking. Recently insufficient funds were seen in distribution of government funded resources that help with trafficking.

The U.S. State Department's Office to Monitor and Combat Trafficking in Persons placed the country in "Tier 2" in 2017, 2018 and 2023; a Tier 2 country does not meet the minimum standards required to ending trafficking, but is making efforts.

== Background ==
Costa Rica is located in Central America. The capital of Costa Rica is San José. The population includes people of European, Spanish, African, Chinese, and Indigenous descent totaling in 4.9 million people. The population includes four fifths of European descent while the other percentage is made up of the indigenous people Mestizos. Mestizos is a mix of European and Indian descent. The languages include Spanish, Limonese, Bribrí, Cabécar, Maléku Jaíka, Boruca, and Térraba. The major religion is Roman Catholic. The other religions are Protestant, Jewish, and Mennonite.

Costa Rica's economy runs on the agriculture, forestry, and fishing industry. The important goods are sugar, coffee, bananas, pineapples, cut flowers, gourmet coffee, herbs, macadamia nuts, and palm oil. The fishing industry mostly includes tuna, shrimp, and tilapia. The agriculture is the most important natural resource for Costa Rica. One third of workers in Costa Rica are women.

Costa Rica's government system includes a President, two Vice Presidents, and a unicameral Legislative Assembly. There are seven provinces in Costa Rica that are divided by districts. The governors are appointed by the President. In Costa Rica there is a single judge or a panel of judges. There are no juries and death penalty in Costa Rica.

The age of consent is 15 years old. In Costa Rica, prostitution is legal. Individuals have to be 18 years and older. Prostitutes can be found in hotels, bars, clubs, and massage parlors. Sex workers have to provide proof that they are 18 or older. The government provides identification cards and free medical exams for sex workers.

Slavery was abolished by the Federal Assembly of Guatemala in 1882. Slavery was abolished in Costa Rica on April 17, 1824. Black slaves were brought to Costa Rica with Spanish conquerors. Slaves would work on cacao and banana plantations. Slaves were used in the construction of the railroad. Women were concubines. Children who were born while their mothers were concubines were set free. Free slaves owned their own farms, worked on building railroads, worked for banana companies, cleared the forest, and migrated to other places. However, they were not considered citizens so they did not have legal rights to their farms. Their lands were taken by White Ticos (Costa Ricans).

== Types of Trafficking ==
Children, men, and women are victims of all types of trafficking. Traffickers look for people who are vulnerable. The vulnerable population may be psychologically or emotionally vulnerable, there may be economic issues such as poverty, they may be unsupervised, they may be runaways, they may not speak the language, or they may fear the local law enforcement. These are factors that could lead someone to be in the presence of a trafficker. Traffickers may use physical violence, psychological tactics, dehumanization, threats, manipulation, alcohol, drugs, false promises, or false job ads to seek out trafficker victims and to make them fear leaving.

- Debt bondage
- Domestic servitude
- Forced or unfree labor and labor trafficking
- Human trafficking
- Indentured servitude
- Organ trafficking
- Sex tourism
- Sex trafficking

== Profiling ==
=== Victims ===
Women and children are trafficked into Costa Rica for sex trafficking and forced labor. Most girls are trafficked from Nicaragua, the Dominican Republic, and other Latin countries. Men and children are also vulnerable to forced labor, especially in agriculture and domestic areas of Costa Rica.

=== Offender ===
In 2016, it was reported that 56% of those who were arrested in South America for trafficking were women while 44% were men. More women are being convicted in South America than men.

== Prevention ==
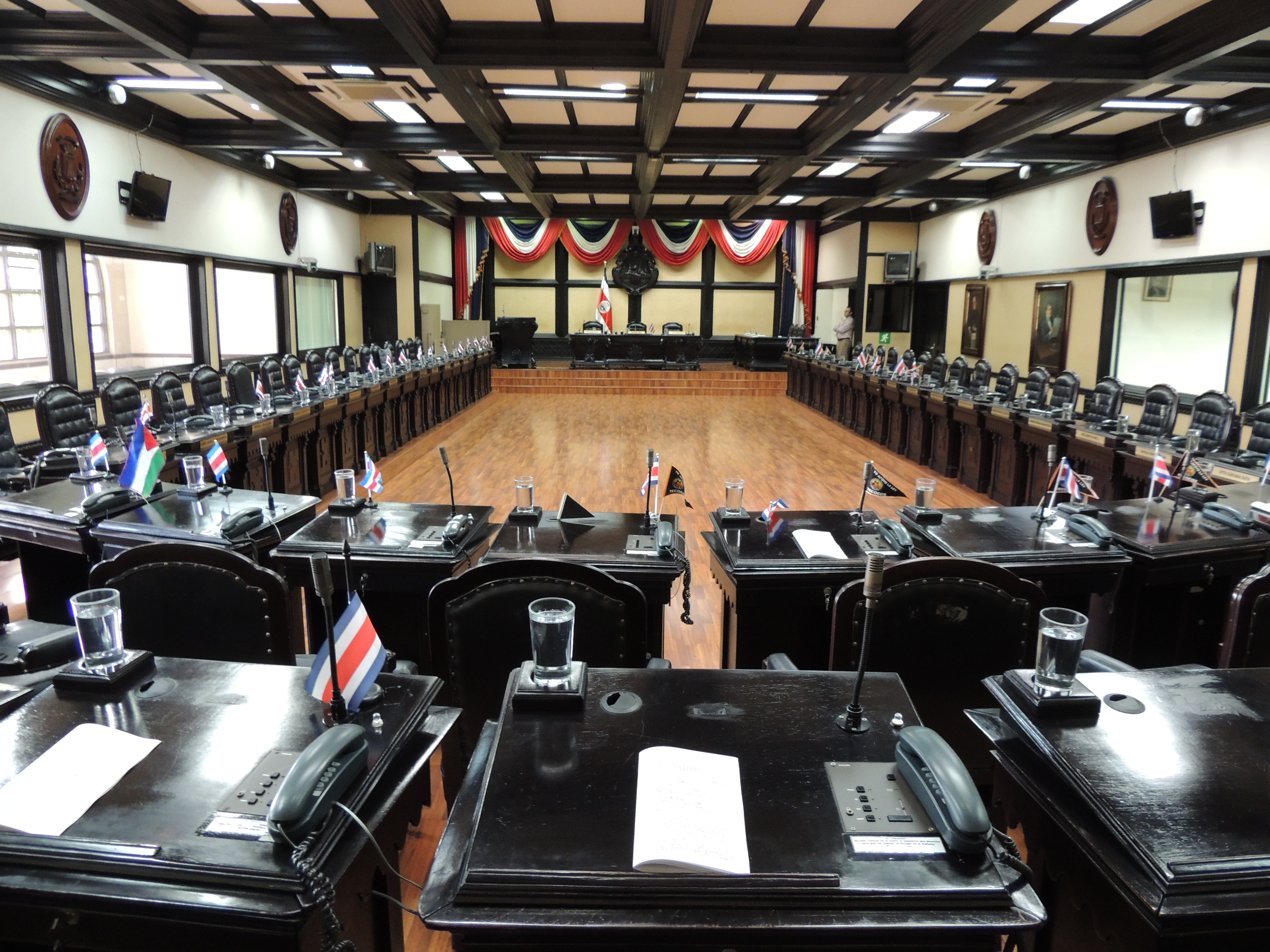
Costa Rica Legislative Assembly room

The Costa Rican government is working to establish firm foundations and fund other organizations to aid in the elimination and prevention of human trafficking within the country. Starting in 2016, the government donated $1.15 million to create a headquarters for National Coalition against Migrant Smuggling and Trafficking in Persons (CONATT) which will aid in increasing awareness and also house a 24 hour emergency response team and as a short term shelter for victims. While Rahab Foundation, a local organization, is working with police to help train them to recognize the signs of a trafficked victim and help get them out of harms way. Many NGO's are working with the public and government officers to bring awareness through education. According to the Costa Rica Star, a local newspaper, in 2017 the government started providing more of the national budget to NGO's, who work to fight against trafficking. After refreshing government policies, NGOs are responding to victims right away by providing food, shelter, and financial and psychological assistance. However, it has been reported that they do not respond on time nor do victims get the same amount of level of protection.

Some other ways prevention is taking place is the government passing laws and other policies to discourage human trafficking acts. The government has passed Law against Trafficking and the 2013 Creation of the National Coalition against the Smuggling of Migrants and Trafficking in Persons to prosecute those who participate in the importing and exporting of persons into Costa Rica for any form of forced sexual work, labor slavery, and/or the trafficking of unlawful organs. By making it illegal and prosecuting offenders, it will aid in discouraging human trafficking due to the fear of consequences. It is believed that Costa Rica can start fixing human trafficking by bringing awareness to it; even their Foreign Ministry officials believe it would be a source of "moral power" and bring about "long-term security" on the international trafficking level. In 2017, the government decided to increase prevention efforts by generating a new action plan for the 2017-2022. It contains support to fund another international organization and to propose more anti-trafficking government related activities.

=== Prosecution ===
The Government of Costa Rica sustained law enforcement efforts against human trafficking during the reporting period. Article 172 of the penal code, which was amended in April 2009, prescribes penalties of six to 10 years’ imprisonment for the movement of persons both across borders and within the country for the purposes of prostitution, sexual or labor servitude, slavery, forced work or services, servile marriage, forced begging, or other forms of compelled service. This statute also prohibits illegal adoption, which does not fall within the international definition of human trafficking. Sentences may be increased to eight to 16 years’ imprisonment under aggravated circumstances, such as the victimization of a child or a trafficker’s use of deception, violence, intimidation, or coercion. The penalties set forth in amended Article 172 are sufficiently stringent and commensurate with those prescribed for other serious crimes, such as rape. Articles 376 and 377 of the penal code additionally prohibit child sex trafficking, prescribing penalties of two to four years’ imprisonment. Law 8754, passed in July 2009, authorized the use of expanded law enforcement and investigative measures, such as wiretapping and the use of anticipated testimonies, when undertaking human trafficking cases.

Insufficient familiarity with the new legislation, however, hindered the enforcement of these laws, and the government continued to use other statutes to prosecute trafficking offenders involved in the commercial sexual exploitation of children. In 2017, it was reported that they opened 26 new cases and prosecuted 39 others dealing with those who trafficked others into the country. The government operated a six-person smuggling and trafficking law enforcement unit, and worked closely with foreign governments in cases of transnational human trafficking. No government officials were prosecuted or convicted of trafficking-related corruption, although during the reporting period one government official was suspended and ultimately fired for his involvement in an alleged forced labor scheme involving Chinese youths; authorities were still investigating the case. For the prostitution and sex tourism laws for visitors, the government claims to offer severe prosecution to those who enter the country advertising and/or encouraging trafficking and prostitution of persons and child. To ensure the safety of child and protect them against human trafficking, the government has the prosecutor's office with a specialized Prosecution Unit against Trafficking in Persons while the judicial investigative police and Ministry of Labor and Social Security (MTSS) works to investigate cases of human trafficking against children.

=== Protection ===
The Costa Rican government has continued to ensure trafficking victims received access to a basic level of victim assistance during the reporting period. The government provided some officials with training on how to treat trafficking victims; however, it has been reported that there has been no proactive efforts to search for trafficking victims among vulnerable populations, such as women or children in prostitution. Although there were no government-provided shelter services dedicated to human trafficking victims, the government referred some victims to basic care at short-term government shelters for women and children. The government often relied on NGO's and religious organizations to provide specialized care for trafficking victims, and there is no shelter nor protection for male victims. Foreign victims were eligible for the same services as Costa Rican citizens. The government’s “immediate attention” protocol defined the steps for different government institutions to take to detect, identify, protect and provide integrated assistance to a victim, and the Immediate Action Team provided services to two potential trafficking victims during the reporting period. The government provided some limited legal and psychological assistance, though NGOs noted the need for greater government efforts to reintegrate victims into their communities.

The government generally did not penalize victims for unlawful acts committed as a direct result of being trafficked. Officials treated some adult migrants as illegal immigrants, however, and deported them without taking adequate measures to determine if they were trafficking victims, and the majority of trafficking victims reported by the government were foreign citizens. Foreign nationals were eligible for work permits or refugee status, and the government had provisions in place to issue a special visa to foreign trafficking victims, though no victims received any of the above during the reporting period. A new immigration law, effective March 2010, authorizes temporary residency status specifically for foreign trafficking victims. Costa Rican authorities encouraged victims to assist with the investigation and prosecution of trafficking offenders, and the government created an enhanced witness protection program last year for victims of crime, though it was not yet fully operational. In 2017, the Institutional Protocol for the Care of Minors and Survivors of Trafficking in Persons was established to detect a crime. The National Coalition against Migrant Smuggling and Trafficking in Persons (CONATT) provides services for human trafficking survivors. These services include food, housing, financial, legal, and psychological.

=== Anti-Trafficking Organizations ===
In 2016, the Costa Rican government joined the Blue Heart Campaign, which was created by the UNODC to aid governments, organizations, and both media and private outlets to reveal, prevent, and fight against human trafficking within countries. Bring awareness and education to the public will aid in the identification and elimination of trafficking within the communities. The following year, 2017, for the 5th time, Costa Rica and Panama paired up together to hold a walk to and from each country that aims to educate and shed light on human trafficking and how citizens can recognize and prevent it within their countries, which is supported by both Costa Rican and Panamainan law enforcement. Another organization working within Costa Rica for prevention of the trafficking of Persons is the Face of Justice Association, where they are training both police officers and politicians throughout the country to educate them on victims of trafficking and on how to recognize and eliminate it. Fundación Paniamor is an organization in Costa Rica that was declared a public interest by Costa Rican State by Decree in 1989 due to their strong efforts to provide opportunities for adolescents so they can avoid being trafficked and exploited.

Some NGO's currently working within Costa Rica include: Alianza por tus Derecho is an active organization that is aiming to generate programs that promote and validate the human rights children have to eliminate the exploitation and abuse they endure during labor. Some programs they offer include a psychological support system that entails individual therapy and family therapy to rehabilitate their mental health while fixing the social stigma among the family. The government sustained strong prevention efforts during the reporting year, training officials and employing partnerships with NGOs, international organizations, and foreign governments to increase public awareness about human trafficking. The government, in partnership with UNICEF and other international organizations, continued the “Don’t Let Them Lie to You” anti-trafficking prevention campaign, which reached a projected fifty percent of the adult and adolescent population between October 2008 and June 2009. The government in 2018 has pledged $25,000 of its budget to go towards this program.
