= Dominican Republic Weightlifting Federation =

Sports governing body in the Dominican Republic

Dominican Republic Weightlifting Federation Federación Dominicana de Levantamiento de Pesas
- Sport: Weightlifting
- Jurisdiction: Dominican Republic
- Abbreviation: FEDOMPESA
- Founded: 1956
- Affiliation: IWF
- President: Willian Ozuna
- Vice president: Félix Ogando
- Secretary: Bolivar Vargas

Official website
- fedompesa.org
- (Dominican Republic)

The Dominican Republic Weightlifting Federation (Spanish: Federación Dominicana de Levantamiento de Pesas) (FEDOMPESA) is the governing body for the sport of weightlifting in the Dominican Republic.

== History ==
The origins of Dominican Republic olympic weightlifting started in 1946, when the sport was first practiced on the Dominican Evangelical Church's patio in the Colonial Zone. Eridania Segura won the first medal in a World Championships in the 1992 edition before Yuderqui Contreras won the bronze medal in the 53 kg category at the 2005 World Weightlifting Championships.
