= Turks and Caicos Islands Rugby Football Union =

TCIRFU
- Sport: Rugby union
- Founded: 2001
- NACRA affiliation: 2011 (Associate Member)
- President: Keith Burant
- Website: www.rugby.tc

The Turks and Caicos Islands Rugby Football Union, or TCIRFU, is the body managing rugby union in the Turks and Caicos Islands. The TCIRFU has its head office and grounds on Providenciales, where Turks and Caicos rugby union international matches are played. In addition the Union also trains on Grace Bay beach on Providenciales.

In August 2011, the TCIRFU was admitted as an associate member of NACRA, which is the governing body for rugby union in North America and the Caribbean.

The TCIRFU is made up of Turks and Caicos Islanders as well as expatriate residents from England, Scotland, Wales, Ireland, Canada, United States, Australia, New Zealand, and South Africa. The TCIRFU competes at fifteen- and seven-a-side rugby union.

== History ==
Rugby in the Turks and Caicos Islands began in the early eighties with ex pat teams playing against visiting Royal Navy warships in Grand Turk. In the nineties the focus moved onto Providenciales where a similar ex pat crowd from throughout the Commonwealth would get together on a Thursday evening in the old downtown ballpark. Due to the harsh nature of the terrain it was limited to touch – new players learnt the hard way that going to ground would take a few weeks to heal! Touring parties were created and traveled first to Tamarac Florida and then on to the Dominican Republic and the Carib 7's in Trinidad where they won the award for the most sociable team but also a couple of plates.

The TCIRFU was formed in 2001 and continues to grow through tours to Cuba, the Bahamas and the United States.

== Youth Rugby ==
The TCIRFU run a youth academy for aspiring rugby players in the islands.

== Competition ==
The Turks and Caicos national team, the Flamingos, plays representative matches against the Bahamas as well as competing against touring club sides from the United States and passing British Warships.

The TCIRFU has also sent teams to compete in the Trinidad Sevens, Bahamas Sevens, Cayman Sevens, Cuba, the Dominican Republic and the Canada-American Rugby Tournament at Saranac Lake, New York.

The TCIRFU also hosts the annual Governors Cup Beach Rugby Championship.

== See also ==
- Rugby union in the Turks and Caicos Islands
