= International rankings of the Dominican Republic =

These are the international rankings of the Dominican Republic

== Economy ==
- World Economic Forum Global Competitiveness Report ranked 95 out of 133

== Politics ==
- Transparency International Corruption Perceptions Index ranked 99 out of 180

== Society ==
- Institute for Economics and Peace Global Peace Index ranked 70 out of 144
- United Nations Development Programme| Human Development Index ranked 90 out of 182

== Technology ==
- World Intellectual Property Organization: Global Innovation Index 2026 ranked 99 out of 139 countries
