= Prostitution in the Dominican Republic =

Prostitution in the Dominican Republic is legal, but related activities such as brothel-keeping or pimping are illegal. However, prostitution laws are generally not enforced. It is estimated that between 6,000 and 10,000 women work as prostitutes in the country, with many of the sex workers coming from neighboring Haiti. The population of illegal Haitian migrants in the country are particularly vulnerable to exploitation.

== Sex tourism ==
The Dominican Republic has gained a reputation of being a major destination for international sex tourism, although the activity is mostly concentrated in poor coastal towns (especially Las Terrenas, Cabarete, Sosúa, and Boca Chica), where women have less economic opportunities than in larger towns and cities of the country. Haitian immigrants also take part in the sex tourism business, with many of the prostitutes in some areas being of Haitian descent. At sex tourism sites the lighter Dominicans are favored over darker Haitians, who are forced to work in the streets or local bars rather than the more lucrative up-scale areas.

Underage prostitution is a problem, particularly in some urban areas within coastal towns, but there has been a decrease in child prostitution since 2001, with the increase in policing and the decrease in corruption. The United States Immigration and Customs Enforcement has started prosecuting individuals who are engaging in child prostitution. A 2015 study by the International Justice Mission found a quarter of sex workers working on the streets, in parks and on beaches were under 18 years old.

== HIV ==
The prevalence of HIV/AIDS in the Dominican Republic was estimated to be 0.9% in 2019 – while this figure represents an increase from 0.7% in 2006, it remains relatively low by Caribbean standards. However, the percentage among sex workers is estimated to be much higher, ranging from 2.5% to 12.4%, depending on the locale.

== Sex trafficking ==
According to the US Department of State, the Dominican Republic is a source, transit and destination country for human trafficking. Women and children from neighboring Haiti are specially vulnerable to trafficking due to the prevalence of "Restavek" child slavery in Haitian culture, which affects approximately 300,000 Haitian children.

Women from other parts of the Caribbean, Asia, South America, and Eastern Europe to a lesser extent have also been known to be trafficked into the country for Forced prostitution. Colombian and Venezuelan women who had been brought into the country to dance in strip clubs are forced to work in prostitution in some tourist areas.

Dominican women are also subjected to sex trafficking within the island, the rest of the Caribbean, Europe, South and Central America, the Middle East, Asia and the United States. After the 2010 Haiti earthquake, some Dominican sex workers crossed over the border into Haiti, searching out clients amongst the aid workers and UN personnel. Dominican women are paid a premium because of their lighter skin.

The United States Department of State Office to Monitor and Combat Trafficking in Persons ranks the Dominican Republic as a 'Tier 2' country.

== Sosúa ==
According to a 1998 report, women in Sosúa are faced with a choice between working with locals or with tourists; working with locals encompasses less risk, but the resulting lifestyle, while stable, may be considerably poorer. Those who work in sex tourism but choose to live outside of the local bars enjoy a greater level of freedom, but may suffer financial stress as they must pay their own rent. Many sexual relations become romantic relationships beyond the simple exchange of money for sex, with women referring to regular clients as boyfriends who in turn provide financial support and other assistance. These women typically have little to no control over their clients but almost all are in search of a husband to better their livelihoods. Many of these women are in overcrowded homes with limited space plumbing and technology. When long-term clients begin to consistently provide gifts, many women consider their relationship an unofficial 'marriage' – an arrangement more akin to a social contract where the two individuals act as if they were married but with no official recognition or documentation. Women in Sosúa frequently enter the sex trade with the desire to better their circumstances by marrying European men, due to the apparent lifestyle these men can provide – alongside a distrust or dislike of local men. Rumors of sex trafficking are often ignored by these women.

== See also ==
- Women in the Dominican Republic
- Tourism in the Dominican Republic
- HIV/AIDS in the Dominican Republic
- Prostitution in Haiti
