= Dominican Republic national rugby union team =

Dominican Republic
- Union: Dominican Rugby Federation
Team kit

First international
- British Virgin Islands 62–5 Dominican Republic (Road Town, British Virgin Islands; 5 February 2000)

Largest win
- Dominican Republic 59–24 Curaçao (San Cristóbal, Dominican Republic; 10 December 2023)

Largest defeat
- British Virgin Islands 62–5 Dominican Republic (Road Town, British Virgin Islands; 5 February 2000)

The Dominican Republic national rugby union team represents the Dominican Republic in rugby union. The team's first international match was played against Haiti in 1973. The team also played the British Virgin Islands in February 2000.

== Record ==
Below is a table of the representative rugby matches played by a Dominican Republic national XV at test level up until 10 December 2023, updated after match with Curaçao.

Opponent	Played	Won	Lost	Drawn	% Won
Bahamas	1	0	1	0	0%
British Virgin Islands	4	1	3	0	25%
Curaçao	4	4	0	0	100%
Guadeloupe	1	0	1	0	0%
Turks and Caicos Islands	3	1	2	0	33.33%
Total	13	6	7	0	46.15%

== See also ==
- Rugby union in the Dominican Republic
- Dominican Rugby Federation
- Dominican Republic national rugby union team (sevens)
