= List of Trinidad and Tobago women's national rugby union team matches =

The following is a list of Trinidad and Tobago women's national rugby union team international matches.

== Overall ==
Trinidad and Tobago's overall international match record against all nations, updated to 28 June 2025, is as follows:

	Games Played	Won	Drawn	Lost	Percentage of wins
Total	19	14	1	4	73.68%

== Full Internationals ==
=== Legend ===
Won	Lost	Draw

=== 2000s ===
Test	Date	Opponent	F	A	Venue	Tournament	Ref
1	2003-12-03	Jamaica	20	0	Port of Spain	2003 NAWIRA	
2	2003-12-04	Jamaica	10	0	Port of Spain	2003 NAWIRA	
3	2006-09-29	Guyana	15	8	Kingston	2006 NAWIRA	
4	2006-09-30	Jamaica	0	27	Kingston	2006 NAWIRA	
5	2008-05-05	Jamaica	12	10	Georgetown	2008 NAWIRA	
6	2008-05-07	Guyana	5	5	Georgetown	2008 NAWIRA	
7	2008-05-10	Cayman Islands	79	0	Georgetown	2008 NAWIRA	
8	2009-06-21	Saint Vincent	90	0	Bridgetown	2009 NAWIRA	
9	2009-06-24	Barbados	78	0	Bridgetown	2009 NAWIRA	
10	2009-06-27	Cayman Islands	48	0	Bridgetown	2009 NAWIRA	

=== 2011 ===
Test	Date	Opponent	F	A	Venue	Tournament	Ref
11	2011-07-10	(Caribbean Community) Caribbean XV	92	0	Truman Bodden Sports Complex	2011 NACRA	
12	2011-07-12	Jamaica	37	5	Truman Bodden Sports Complex	2011 NACRA	
13	2011-07-15	Cayman Islands	50	0	Truman Bodden Sports Complex	2011 NACRA	

=== 2020s ===
Test	Date	Opponent	F	A	Venue	Tournament	Ref
14	2023-07-13	Jamaica	8	7	Mona Bowl, Kingston	2023 RAN	
15	2023-07-14	Cayman Islands	27	12	Mona Bowl, Kingston	2023 RAN	
16	2024-06-15	Colombia	0	96	Estadio Cincuentenario, Medellín	Test match	
17	2024-07-14	Mexico	0	27	FC Total, Querétaro	2024 RAN	
18	2025-05-31	Jamaica	7	73	Bramwell Clarke Sports Complex, Ewarton	Test match	
19	2025-06-28	Mexico	18	16	Larry Gomes Stadium, Malabar, Arima	Test match	

== Other matches ==
Date	Trinidad and Tobago	Score	Opponent	Venue	Event
2023-07-13	Trinidad & Tobago	6–5	USA South	Mona Bowl, Kingston	2023 RAN
2023-07-14	Trinidad & Tobago	0–19	Mexico XV	Mona Bowl, Kingston	2023 RAN
2023-07-16	Trinidad & Tobago	0–30	USA South	Mona Bowl, Kingston	2023 RAN
2024-02-23	Trinidad & Tobago	17–15	USA South	Queen's Park Savannah, Port of Spain	Friendly
2024-02-25	Trinidad & Tobago	15–17	USA South	Queen's Park Savannah, Port of Spain	Friendly
2024-07-10	Trinidad & Tobago	10–41	USA South	FC Total, Querétaro	2024 RAN
