= List of Cayman Islands women's national rugby union team matches =

The following is a list of the Cayman Islands women's national rugby union team international matches.

== Overall ==
The Cayman Islands's overall international match record against all nations, updated to 16 July 2023, is as follows:

	Games Played	Won	Drawn	Lost	Win %
Total	14	5	0	9	35.71%

== Full internationals ==
Won	Lost	Draw

=== 2000s ===
Test	Date	Cayman Islands	Score	Opponent	Venue	Event
1	2004-06-19	Cayman Islands	3–15	Jamaica	Montego Bay	First Test
2	2008-05-05	Cayman Islands	0–41	Guyana	Georgetown, Guyana	2008 NAWIRA
3	2008-05-07	Cayman Islands	7–12	Jamaica	Georgetown, Guyana	2008 NAWIRA
4	2008-05-10	Cayman Islands	0–79	Trinidad and Tobago	Georgetown, Guyana	2008 NAWIRA
5	2008-06-14	Cayman Islands	0–15	Jamaica	Kingston, Jamaica	
6	2009-06-21	Cayman Islands	54–3	Barbados	Bridgetown, Barbados	2009 NAWIRA
7	2009-06-24	Cayman Islands	76–0	St Vincent	Bridgetown, Barbados	2009 NAWIRA
8	2009-06-27	Cayman Islands	0–48	Trinidad and Tobago	Bridgetown, Barbados	2009 NAWIRA

=== 2010s ===
Test	Date	Cayman Islands	Score	Opponent	Venue	Event
9	2010-08-21	Cayman Islands	48–0	Bahamas	Nassau, Bahamas	2010 CARIB
10	2011-07-10	Cayman Islands	12–15	Jamaica	Grand Cayman, Cayman Islands	2011 NACRA
11	2011-07-12	Cayman Islands	27–12	(Caribbean Community) Caribbean Select XV	Grand Cayman, Cayman Islands	2011 NACRA
12	2011-07-15	Cayman Islands	0–50	Trinidad and Tobago	Grand Cayman, Cayman Islands	2011 NACRA

=== 2020s ===
Test	Date	Cayman Islands	Score	Opponent	Venue	Event
13	2023-07-14	Cayman Islands	12–27	Trinidad and Tobago	Mona Bowl, Kingston	2023 RAN Championship
14	2023-07-14	Cayman Islands	13–8	Jamaica	Mona Bowl, Kingston	2023 RAN Championship

== Other Matches ==
Date	Cayman Islands	Score	Opponent	Venue	Event
2010-08-15	Cayman Islands	0–85	United States U20	Nassau, Bahamas	2010 NACRA
2010-08-17	Cayman Islands	0–62	Canada U20	Nassau, Bahamas	2010 NACRA
2023-07-13	Cayman Islands	0–20	Mexico XV	Mona Bowl, Kingston	2023 RAN Championship
2023-07-13	Cayman Islands	0–50	USA South	Mona Bowl, Kingston	2023 RAN Championship
2023-07-16	Cayman Islands	11–15	Mexico XV	Mona Bowl, Kingston	2023 RAN Championship
