= Rugby Americas North Women's Rugby Championship =

Women's rugby tournament

RAN Women's Rugby Championship
- Current season, competition or edition: 2024 RAN Women's Rugby Championship
- Formerly: NACRA Women's Rugby Championship
- Sport: Rugby union
- Founded: 2003
- No. of teams: 3 (2024)
- Countries: Mexico; Trinidad and Tobago; USA
- Most recent champion: (United States) USA Rugby South (2024)
- Most titles: Trinidad and Tobago (5 titles)

The RAN Women's Rugby Championship is the regional championship for women's international rugby union in North America and the Caribbean that is sanctioned by RAN.

In 2010 the former NAWIRA Caribbean Women's Rugby Championship became the NACRA Women's Rugby Championship, potentially broadening its coverage in accordance with the widened aim of its recently renamed sponsor. In 2015 NACRA was rebranded to Rugby Americas North as part of a global renaming policy.

== History ==
Initially named the NAWIRA Caribbean Women's Rugby Championship, it was a small tournament run by the IRB through NAWIRA. Rugby sevens is a growing inter-island sport, but the full 15-a-side game is significantly more resource intensive and so it was only with the financial support of the IRB that the first tournament took place in December 2003.

Only Trinidad and Jamaica took part in the first event, Trinidad winning both legs in Port of Spain. In September 2006 a second event was organised, this time in Kingston, Jamaica and featuring Guyana. The hosts were again winners by the narrowest of margins.

The tournament took place annually, however the 2007 edition was cancelled. It was arranged to take place in the Cayman Islands, starting 19 August 2007, but was cancelled the day before it was due to start as a result of Hurricane Dean. Three teams had been due to take part - Cayman Islands, Jamaica, and Trinidad & Tobago.

After 2009 NAWIRA was reorganised as NACRA (North America and Caribbean Rugby Association) in order to better encourage participation by unions outside the English-speaking West Indies. From 2010 the tournament became the NACRA Women's Rugby Championship. However, a separate play-off for the Caribbean title was organised for the island teams taking part.

The popularity of rugby sevens among other things caused a decline in the fifteens code, the 2011 tournament being the last time the 15-a-side game was played. After the formation of RAN the ten-a-side version of the game has been played with hopes of reviving fifteens.

On November 16, 2021 RAN announced the first-ever Women’s 12-a-side tournament to be held in Cayman Islands from December 4 to 5. Originally announced as a ten-a-side tournament, competing nations agreed to increase their teams by two players. The purpose of the tournament was to increase competition for women in the region and to allow nations to continue building towards 15s. The tournament was cancelled due to travel restrictions brought on by the COVID-19 pandemic.

In 2023, RAN confirmed the return of Women’s fifteens after a successful 12-a-side tournament held in Jamaica in 2022.

== Appearances ==
Six nations have taken part in the Caribbean Women's Rugby Championships held to date:

- Trinidad and Tobago - 4 appearances (2003, 2006, 2008, 2009)
- Jamaica - 3 appearances (2003, 2006, 2008)
- Cayman Islands - 2 appearances (2008, 2009)
- Guyana - 2 appearances (2006, 2008)
- Barbados - 1 appearance (2009)
- Saint Vincent and the Grenadines - 1 appearance (2009)

== Champions ==
Year	Host	Winner	Runner-up	Refs
NAWIRA Women's Rugby Championship
2003	Trinidad and Tobago	Trinidad and Tobago	Jamaica	
2006	Jamaica	Jamaica	Guyana	
2008	Guyana	Trinidad and Tobago	Guyana	
2009	Barbados	Trinidad and Tobago	Cayman Islands	
NACRA Women's Rugby Championship
2010	Bahamas	Canada U20	United States U20	
2011	Cayman Islands	Trinidad and Tobago	Jamaica	
RAN Women's 10s
2016	(United States) Miami, Florida	(United States) USA Rugby South Panthers	Trinidad and Tobago	
2017	(United States) Miami, Florida	Trinidad and Tobago	(United States) USA South	
2018	Mexico City	(United States) USA South	Jamaica	
2019	(Barbados) Bridgetown	Mexico	Jamaica	
2020	Cancelled due to the COVID-19 pandemic			
2021	Cancelled due to the COVID-19 pandemic			
RAN Women's 12s
2022	(Jamaica) Kingston	(United States) USA Rugby South Panthers	Jamaica	
RAN Women's Rugby Championship
2023	(Jamaica) Kingston	(United States) USA South	Trinidad and Tobago	
2024	(Mexico) Querétaro	(United States) USA South	Mexico	

== See also ==
- Caribbean Women's Rugby Championship
- Women's international rugby - includes all women's international match results
