= List of Jamaica women's national rugby union team matches =

The following is a list of Jamaica women's national rugby union team international matches.

== Overall ==
Jamaica's overall international match record against all nations, updated to 31 May 2025, is as follows:

| | Games played | Won | Drawn | Lost | Win% |
| Total | 17 | 7 | 0 | 10 | 41.18% |

== Full Internationals ==
=== Legend ===
| Won | Lost | Draw |

=== 2003–2008 ===
| Test | Date | Opponent | PF | PA | Venue | Event |
|---|---|---|---|---|---|---|
| 1 | 2003-12-03 | Trinidad and Tobago | 0 | 20 | Port of Spain | 2003 NAWIRA |
| 2 | 2003-12-04 | Trinidad and Tobago | 0 | 10 | Port of Spain | 2003 NAWIRA |
| 3 | 2004-06-19 | Cayman Islands | 15 | 3 | Montego Bay | |
| 4 | 2006-09-28 | Guyana | 5 | 6 | Kingston | 2006 NAWIRA |
| 5 | 2006-09-30 | Trinidad and Tobago | 27 | 0 | Kingston | 2006 NAWIRA |
| 6 | 2008-05-05 | Trinidad and Tobago | 10 | 12 | Georgetown, Guyana | 2008 NAWIRA |
| 7 | 2008-05-07 | Cayman Islands | 12 | 7 | Georgetown, Guyana | 2008 NAWIRA |
| 8 | 2008-05-10 | Guyana | 10 | 13 | Georgetown, Guyana | 2008 NAWIRA |
| 9 | 2008-06-14 | Cayman Islands | 15 | 0 | Kingston | |

=== 2011 ===
| Test | Date | Opponent | PF | PA | Venue | Event |
|---|---|---|---|---|---|---|
| 10 | 2011-07-10 | Cayman Islands | 15 | 12 | Grand Cayman, Cayman Islands | 2011 NACRA |
| 11 | 2011-07-12 | Trinidad and Tobago | 5 | 37 | Grand Cayman, Cayman Islands | 2011 NACRA |
| 12 | 2011-07-14 | (Caribbean Community) Caribbean Select XV | 44 | 13 | Grand Cayman, Cayman Islands | 2011 NACRAC |

=== 2020s ===
| Test | Date | Opponent | PF | PA | Venue | Event | Ref |
|---|---|---|---|---|---|---|---|
| 13 | 2023-07-13 | Trinidad and Tobago | 7 | 8 | Mona Bowl, Kingston | 2023 RAN Championship | |
| 14 | 2023-07-14 | Cayman Islands | 8 | 13 | Mona Bowl, Kingston | 2023 RAN Championship | |
| 15 | 2024-12-07 | Mexico | 19 | 46 | Estadio Alfredo Harp Helú, Mexico City | Test | |
| 16 | 2025-05-24 | Mexico | 19 | 39 | Bramwell Clarke Sports Complex, Ewarton | Test | |
| 17 | 2025-05-31 | Trinidad and Tobago | 73 | 7 | Bramwell Clarke Sports Complex, Ewarton | Test | |

== Other matches ==
| Date | Jamaica | F | A | Opponent | Venue | Event |
|---|---|---|---|---|---|---|
| 2023-07-12 | Jamaica | 12 | 10 | Mexico XV | Mona Bowl, Kingston | 2023 RAN Championship |
| 2023-07-14 | Jamaica | 0 | 37 | USA South | Mona Bowl, Kingston | 2023 RAN Championship |
