= Women's international rugby union results summary =

The most successful teams in women's international rugby union have been England, France, and New Zealand.

== Fifteens ==
=== Current playing records ===
==== 25 matches or more ====
Complete record
	Pld	Won	Dwn	Lst	%
New Zealand	71	62	1	8	88.03
England	212	178	2	32	84.43
France	186	129	4	54	70.43
Kazakhstan	58	35	0	23	60.34
United States	95	53	1	41	56.32
Netherlands	110	56	0	54	50.91
Spain	105	50	2	53	48.57
Japan	36	17	0	19	47.22
Hong Kong	29	13	1	15	46.55
Russia	39	18	0	21	46.15
Scotland	160	70	1	89	44.62
Canada	103	44	2	57	43.69
Wales	157	60	2	95	38.85
Ireland	126	46	0	80	36.51
Italy	115	39	2	74	34.78
Sweden	77	25	0	52	32.46
South Africa	36	11	1	24	31.94
Australia	34	10	0	24	29.41
Germany	62	16	1	45	26.61
Belgium	28	6	1	21	23.21

Last 10 results
	Pld	Won	Dwn	Lst	%
England	10	8	0	2	80.00
France	10	8	0	2	80.00
Ireland	10	8	0	2	80.00
Kazakhstan	10	8	0	2	80.00
New Zealand	10	7	0	3	70.00
Canada	10	6	0	4	60.00
Hong Kong	10	6	0	4	60.00
Japan	10	5	0	5	50.00
Russia	10	5	0	5	50.00
United States	10	5	0	5	50.00
Australia	10	4	0	6	40.00
Italy	10	4	0	6	40.00
Spain	10	4	0	6	40.00
Netherlands	10	4	0	6	40.00
Germany	10	3	1	6	35.00
Sweden	10	3	0	7	30.00
Wales	10	3	0	7	30.00
Belgium	10	2	1	7	25.00
Scotland	10	2	0	8	20.00
South Africa	10	2	0	8	20.00

==== 10-24 matches ====
Complete record
	Pld	Won	Dwn	Lst	%
Trinidad and Tobago	13	11	1	1	88.46
Uganda	19	10	1	7	55.27
Samoa	18	9	0	9	50.00
Jamaica	12	6	0	6	50.00
Kenya	16	7	1	8	46.88
Cayman Islands	12	4	0	8	36.36
Norway	17	4	2	11	29.41
Singapore	24	5	1	18	22.92
Finland	14	2	1	11	17.85

Last 10 results
	Pld	Won	Dwn	Lst	%
Trinidad and Tobago	10	8	1	1	85.00
Jamaica	10	6	0	4	60.00
Kenya	10	5	1	4	65.00
Samoa	10	5	0	5	50.00
Cayman Islands	10	4	0	6	40.00
Uganda	10	4	0	6	40.00
Singapore	10	3	0	7	30.00
Norway	10	1	1	8	15.00
Finland	10	1	0	9	10.00

=== Fewer than 10 matches ===
One win or more
	Pld	Won	Dwn	Lst	%
Namibia	1	1	0	0	100.00
Zambia	1	1	0	0	100.00
Switzerland	6	5	0	1	83.33
Guyana	5	3	1	1	70.00
China	9	6	0	3	66.67
Great Britain	8	5	0	3	62.50
Thailand	9	5	0	4	55.55
Fiji	2	1	0	1	50.00
Uzbekistan	4	2	0	2	50.00
Romania	9	4	0	5	44.44
Philippines	5	2	0	3	40.00
Barbados	3	1	0	2	33.33
(Caribbean Community) Caribbean	4	1	0	3	25.00
Luxembourg	5	1	0	4	20.00

No wins yet recorded
	Pld	Won	Dwn	Lst	%
Austria	2	0	2	0	50.00
Czech Republic	5	0	2	2	20.00
Denmark	5	0	1	4	10.00
Botswana	1	0	0	1	0.00
Brazil	1	0	0	1	0.00
Portugal	1	0	0	1	0.00
Zimbabwe	1	0	0	1	0.00
Bahamas	2	0	0	2	0.00
Kyrgyzstan	2	0	0	2	0.00
Malaysia	2	0	0	2	0.00
Rwanda	2	0	0	2	0.00
Tonga	2	0	0	2	0.00
Saint Vincent and the Grenadines	3	0	0	3	0.00
World XV	3	0	0	3	0.00
Bosnia and Herzegovina	4	0	0	4	0.00
Serbia	4	0	0	4	0.00
Laos	5	0	0	5	0.00
Soviet Union	6	0	0	6	0.00

== Year of first international ==
- 1982: : France(1); Netherlands(1)
- 1984: : Sweden(3)
- 1985: : Italy(4)
- 1986: : Belgium(6); Great Britain(5)
- 1987: : Canada(9); England(7); United States(9); Wales(7)
- 1989: : Germany(11); Spain(10)
- 1990: : New Zealand(12); Soviet Union(13); World XV(14)
- 1991: : Japan(15)
- 1993: : Ireland(16); Kazakhstan(18);Scotland(16)
- 1994: : Australia(20); Russia(19)
- 1995: : Portugal(21)
- 1998: : Hong Kong(22)
- 2000: : Samoa(23)
- 2003: : Denmark(24); Jamaica(26); Norway(24); Trinidad and Tobago(26)
- 2004: : Austria(29); Cayman Islands(31); Czech Republic(29); South Africa(28)
- 2005: : Bosnia and Herzegovina(34); Uganda(32); Rwanda(32); Thailand(34)
- 2006: : China(40); Fiji(36); Guyana(39); Kenya(38); Singapore(40);Tonga(37)
- 2007: : Finland(42); Luxembourg(42); Romania(42); Serbia(42); Zambia(46); Zimbabwe(46)
- 2008: : Brazil(48); Kyrgyzstan(49); Uzbekistan(49)
- 2009: : Barbados(51); Malaysia(53); Saint Vincent and the Grenadines(52)
- 2010: : Bahamas(54); (Caribbean Community) Caribbean XV (55)
- 2011: : Laos(57); Philippines(58); Switzerland(56)
- 2013: : Botswana(59); Namibia(59)

== Year of last international ==
- 2014 : Canada; Czech Republic; Kenya; England; France; Hong Kong; Ireland; Italy; Japan; Kazakhstan; New Zealand; Samoa; Scotland; Singapore; South Africa; Spain; Switzerland; Uganda; United States; Wales
- 2013 : Belgium; Botswana; Namibia; Netherlands; Sweden
- 2012 : China; Finland; Laos; Philippines; Russia; Thailand
- 2011 : (Caribbean Community) Caribbean Select XV; Cayman Islands; Jamaica; Trinidad and Tobago; Uzbekistan
- 2010 : Australia; Bahamas; Germany; Malaysia
- 2009 : Barbados; Norway; Saint Vincent and the Grenadines
- 2008 : Brazil; Guyana; Kyrgyzstan; Romania
- 2007 : Luxembourg; Serbia; Zambia;Zimbabwe
- 2006 : Fiji; Tonga
- 2005 : Austria; Bosnia and Herzegovina; Rwanda
- 2004 : Denmark
- 1995 : Portugal
- 1991 : Soviet Union
- 1990 : Great Britain

== Official rankings ==
=== IRB World Ranking ===
Although the IRB produce a complex and continually updated ranking for men's international rugby they do not compile any ranking system for the women's game. Rugby statistician Serge Piquet has produced a currently unofficial, but generally accepted, world ranking, but where rankings are referred to by some boards these will normally be the finishing positions in the previous Women's Rugby World Cup (which only takes place every four years and will only include those countries that qualified for the finals).

The IRB's seedings for each World Cup are also influenced by positions in the previous tournament, but not entirely decided by them. The table below shows the final positions for the 2014 tournament and is therefore the closest thing to an "official" IRB ranking:

Rank	2014 position
1	New Zealand
2	England
3	Canada
4	France
5	Ireland
6	Australia
7	Spain
8	United States

Rank	2014 position
9	Wales
10	Italy
11	Samoa
12	Scotland
13	South Africa
14	Netherlands
15	Portugal
16	Kazakhstan

=== Rugby Europe Ranking ===
Rugby Europe, formerly known as FIRA-AER, do produce an annual ranking of European nations, based on previous season's Rugby Europe and Six Nations competitions, for use in RE tournaments (though Six Nations teams are often given a higher seeding in tournaments than their ranking might suggest). As these will be based on more recent performances they can contradict the IRB list and also include countries not featuring in the World Cup-based ranking. On the other hand, they obviously only include European nations. Rankings (based on previous season results) appear to be:

Rank	Nation	1997/8	1998/9	1999/0	2000/1	2001/2	2002/3	2003/4	2004/5	2005/6	2006/7	2007/8	2008/9	2009/10	2010/11	2011/12	2012/13
1	England	1	2	1	1	1	2	1	2	2	1	1	1	1	1	1	
2	France	4	3	2	2	4	1	3	1	1	3	2	4	4	2	2	
3	Ireland	8	8	7	8	7	6	5	5	5	5	6	3	3	3	3	
4	Italy	6	6	8	7	8	7	8	7	7	7	8	8	9	5	5	
5	Wales	7	7	6	5	5	5	4	4	6	2	4	2	2	6	4	
6	Scotland	2	1	3	4	2	3	2	3	3	4	5	5	5	4	6	
7	Spain	3	4	4	3	3	4	6	6	4	6	6	7	7	7	7	
8	Netherlands	5	5	9	9	10	10	9	9	8	8	7	7	8	8	8	
9	Sweden	-	-	-	-	9	8	7	8	9	10	10	10	6	9	9	
10	Russia	-	-	-	-	-	-	-	-	11	9	9	9	10	10	10	
11	Finland	-	-	-	-	-	-	-	-	-	-	14	14	14	-	11	
12	Germany	9	9	-	10	11	9	10	10	10	-	12	11	11	11	-	
13	Belgium	-	-	-	-	12	-	-	-	-	11	11	12	12	12	-	
14	Romania	-	-	-	-	-	-	-	-	-	-	13	13	13	-	-	
15	Luxembourg	-	-	-	-	-	-	-	-	-	-	15	15	15	-	-	
16	Norway	-	-	-	-	-	-	11	11	12	12	16	16	16	-	-	
17	Serbia	-	-	-	-	-	-	-	-	-	-	17	-	-	-	-	
18	Denmark	-	-	-	-	-	-	12	12	-	-	-	-	-	-	-	
19	(Bosnia and Herzegovina) Bosnia-Herzegovina	-	-	-	-	-	-	-	-	13	-	-	-	-	-	-	
NR	Switzerland	-	-	-	-	-	-	-	-	-	-	-	-	-	-	-	
NR	Kazakhstan	-	-	5	6	6	-	-	-	-	-	-	-	-	-	-	

== Sevens ==
=== Current playing record (to end of 2011) ===
Detailed results from a small number of tournaments, especially in Africa and Asia, have never been published. The following table therefore relates to the published tournament results. Note: Almost all of New Zealand's sevens matches - apart from the 2009 World Cup and qualifier and two Hong Kong Sevens - have been played by "Aotearoa Maori" and (before 2000) "New Zealand Wild Ducks". While in some cases they were officially sanctioned by the NZRU, neither were full New Zealand teams, and occasionally included players not eligible to play for New Zealand. As a result, they are not included in the table below. The playing record of these unofficial New Zealand teams is: Played 59, Won 55, Lost 4, 93.22%.

20 Matches or more
Nation	P	W	D	L	%
Ukraine	25	23	0	2	92.00%
New Zealand	25	22	0	3	88.00%
Australia	58	50	1	7	87.07%
England	82	69	0	13	84.15%
Tunisia	30	24	1	5	81.67%
Kazakhstan	104	78	1	25	75.48%
Canada	53	40	0	13	75.47%
USA	97	72	1	24	74.74%
France	85	59	3	23	71.18%
Brazil	55	39	0	16	70.91%
Spain	72	49	2	21	69.44%
China	121	81	3	37	68.18%
South Africa	25	17	0	8	68.00%
Switzerland	49	32	0	17	65.31%
Hungary	112	70	6	36	65.18%
Guyana	34	21	2	11	64.71%
Trinidad and Tobago	24	15	1	8	64.58%
Jamaica	28	18	0	10	64.29%
Uganda	30	18	2	10	63.33%
Zambia	21	13	0	8	61.90%
Samoa	42	26	0	16	61.90%
Columbia	36	21	2	13	61.11%
Venezuela	34	20	1	13	60.29%
Romania	56	33	1	22	59.82%
Fiji	26	15	1	10	59.62%
Netherlands	88	50	2	36	57.95%
Russia	47	26	2	19	57.45%
Finland	54	31	0	23	57.41%
Wales	26	14	1	11	55.77%
Moldova	37	20	1	16	55.41%
Chile	34	17	3	14	54.41%
Belgium	52	27	2	23	53.85%
Germany	54	29	0	25	53.70%
Poland	68	36	0	32	52.94%
Denmark	37	19	0	18	51.35%
Lithuania	39	20	0	19	51.28%
Thailand	113	56	3	54	50.88%
Argentina	34	16	2	16	50.00%
Italy	52	25	2	25	50.00%
Uruguay	33	15	2	16	48.48%
St Lucia	28	13	1	14	48.21%
Georgia	27	13	0	14	48.15%
Japan	110	51	3	56	47.73%
Papua New Guinea	34	16	0	18	47.06%
Andorra	47	22	0	25	46.81%
Norway	45	21	0	24	46.67%
Czech Republic	86	39	1	46	45.93%
Portugal	56	23	4	29	44.64%
Croatia	81	34	4	43	44.44%
Hong Kong	127	54	4	69	44.09%
Austria	102	43	3	56	43.63%
Kenya	20	8	1	11	42.50%
Arabian Gulf	81	33	1	47	41.36%
Malta	50	19	3	28	41.00%
Zimbabwe	22	9	0	13	40.91%
Latvia	33	13	1	19	40.91%
Laos	26	10	0	16	38.46%
Singapore	124	45	4	75	37.90%
Israel	51	19	0	32	37.25%
Sweden	53	19	1	33	36.79%
Serbia	48	17	1	30	36.46%
Taiwan	31	10	0	21	32.26%
Bulgaria	62	18	0	44	29.03%
Sri Lanka	29	8	0	21	27.59%
Uzbekistan	33	8	0	25	24.24%
Malaysia	34	8	0	26	23.53%
Cayman Islands	23	5	0	18	21.74%
India	33	7	0	26	21.21%
Luxembourg	45	9	1	35	21.11%
Guam	27	4	3	20	20.37%
Paraguay	30	4	0	26	13.33%
Bosnia and Herzegovina	45	5	1	39	12.22%
Korea	20	2	0	18	10.00%
Slovenia	50	3	2	45	8.00%
Peru	34	2	0	32	5.88%

19 matches or less
Nation	P	W	D	L	%
Nigeria	5	4	0	1	80.00%
Senegal	9	6	1	2	72.22%
Ireland	12	8	0	4	66.67%
Morocco	14	7	0	7	50.00%
Ghana	8	3	1	4	43.75%
Cook Islands	18	7	1	10	41.67%
Mexico	15	6	0	9	40.00%
Philippines	11	4	0	7	36.36%
Cameroon	3	1	0	2	33.33%
Madagascar	9	3	0	6	33.33%
New Caledonia	9	3	0	6	33.33%
Burkina Faso	12	4	0	8	33.33%
Iran	15	5	0	10	33.33%
Scotland	8	2	1	5	31.25%
Ivory Coast	7	2	0	5	28.57%
Kyrgyzstan	8	2	0	6	25.00%
Botswana	12	3	0	9	25.00%
Togo	9	2	0	7	22.22%
St Vincent	10	2	0	8	20.00%
Tonga	10	2	0	8	20.00%
Rwanda	11	2	0	9	18.18%
Bermuda	6	1	0	5	16.67%
Guadeloupe	7	1	0	6	14.29%
Tahiti	7	0	2	5	14.29%
Indonesia	7	0	1	6	7.14%
Barbados	15	1	0	14	6.67%
West Indies	1	0	0	1	0.00%
Bahamas	4	0	0	4	0.00%
Niue	4	0	0	4	0.00%
Slovakia	4	0	0	4	0.00%
Burundi	6	0	0	6	0.00%
Egypt	8	0	0	8	0.00%
Cambodia	13	0	0	13	0.00%

Year	Matches
1997	32
1999	15
2000	42
2001	41
2002	15
2003	87
2004	51
2005	141
2006	101
2007	212
2008	303
2009	283
2010	337
2011	408
Total	2068

=== Year of first international ===
Debut Year	Nations
1997	Arabian Gulf; Australia; Canada; England; Fiji; Hong Kong; Japan; Netherlands; Scotland; Singapore; United States
1999	China; Russia; Samoa
2000	Kazakhstan; New Zealand; Thailand; Wales
2001	Sweden
2003	Belgium; Bulgaria; Croatia; Czech Republic; France; Kyrgyzstan; Norway; Portugal; Spain; Sri Lanka; Switzerland; Uzbekistan
2004	Argentina; Brazil; Chile; Colombia; Malta; Paraguay; Peru; Tunisia; Uruguay; Venezuela
2005	Austria; Barbados; Germany; Guyana; Hungary; Israel; Italy; Jamaica; Lithuania; Poland; Saint Lucia; Saint Vincent and the Grenadines; Trinidad and Tobago; West Indies
2006	Andorra; Bosnia and Herzegovina; Burkina Faso; Guam; Ireland; Kenya; Luxembourg; Romania; Rwanda; Uganda; Zambia; Zimbabwe
2007	Cambodia; Denmark; Finland; Ivory Coast; South Korea; Laos; Latvia; Moldova; Papua New Guinea; Serbia
2008	Bermuda; Botswana; Cayman Islands; Georgia; Madagascar; Niue; Slovenia; South Africa; Taiwan
2009	Bahamas; Burkina Faso; Egypt; Ghana; India; Iran; Malaysia; Mexico Morocco; Niger; Togo; Ukraine
2010	Cook Islands; Guadeloupe; Indonesia; Philippines; Senegal; Tonga
2011	Cameroon; New Caledonia; Slovakia
2012	Solomon Islands
2013	Turkey
2015	Costa Rica; Montenegro

=== Official rankings ===
==== IRB World Ranking ====
As with rankings for 15-a-side rugby, IRB rankings for Sevens are based on the finishing positions in the previous World Cup. The table below shows the final positions for the 2009 tournament:

2009 World Cup	Nation
1	Australia
2	New Zealand
3=	South Africa
4=	United States
5	England
6	Canada
7=	France
7=	Spain
9	China
10	Brazil
11=	Italy
11=	Russia
13=	Netherlands
13=	Japan
13=	Thailand
13=	Uganda

==== Rugby Europe Ranking ====
Rugby Europe also produce an annual ranking of European nations, based on previous season's RE championships which are used for the following season's tournaments. Current rankings are:

Pos	2010	2011
1	Spain	England
2	Netherlands	Spain
3	France	Netherlands
4	Italy	Russia
5	England	France
6	Russia	Portugal
7	Germany	Germany
8	Portugal	Italy
9	Sweden	Sweden
10	Moldova	Moldova
11	Finland	Ukraine
12	Switzerland	Switzerland
13	Belgium	Finland
14	Romania	Romania
15	Latvia	Czech Republic
16	Andorra	Croatia
17	Czech Republic	Austria
18	Austria	Belgium
19	Croatia	Norway
20	Bulgaria	Bulgaria
21	Israel	Latvia
22	Ukraine	Malta
23	Malta	Poland
24	Hungary	Denmark
25	Norway	Andorra
26	Poland	Israel
27	Georgia	Georgia
28	Lithuania	Hungary
29	Denmark	Lithuania
30	Luxembourg	Serbia
31	Bosnia and Herzegovina	Luxembourg
32	Slovenia	Bosnia and Herzegovina
33	Serbia	Slovenia
