= 2022 RAN Women's 12s =

Rugby union competition for women's national teams

2022 RAN Women’s 12s
Tournament details
- Host: Jamaica
- Venue: University of the West Indies
- Date: 15–16 July
- Teams: 6

Final positions
- Champions: United States
- Runner-up: Jamaica

Tournament statistics
- Matches played: 12

The 2022 RAN Women's 12s was the first edition of the 12-a-side rugby union tournament. It took place over two days on 15 and 16 July 2022 in Kingston, Jamaica at the University of the West Indies and included six teams. The format for 2022 changed from a rugby tens competition to a 12-a-side. The tournament is used as a development tool for the women's game, with the aim of a Women's 15-a-side international competition for the region. USA South Panthers won the tournament after beating, runners-up, Jamaica in the final.

== Teams ==
Teams are seeded based on the results of the 2019 RAN Women's 10s.

Seed	Team
1	Jamaica
2	(United States) USA South Panthers
3	Saint Lucia
4	Dominican Republic
5	Trinidad and Tobago
6	Cayman Islands

== Format ==
On Day 1, teams were divided into two pools of three according to their seeding, with a total of six matches played. Day 2 followed a similar format, with two pools of three based on the day 1 results followed by the finals.

== Matches ==
=== Day 1 ===
==== Pool A ====
Place	Team	P	W	D	L	PF	PA	PD	TF	TA	TD	Pts.
1	Jamaica	2	2	0	0	55	5	50	9	1	8	9
2	Trinidad and Tobago	2	1	0	1	12	10	2	2	2	0	5
3	Dominican Republic	2	2	0	2	0	52	-52	0	8	-8	1

July 15th

Jamaica	10–5	Trinidad and Tobago

University of the West Indies

July 15th

Dominican Republic	0–7	Trinidad and Tobago

University of the West Indies

July 15th

Jamaica	45–0	Dominican Republic

University of the West Indies

==== Pool B ====
Place	Team	P	W	D	L	PF	PA	PD	TF	TA	TD	Pts.
1	(United States) USA South Panthers	2	2	0	0	37	5	32	6	1	5	9
2	Saint Lucia	2	1	0	1	24	16	8	4	2	2	5
3	Cayman Islands	2	0	0	2	8	48	-40	1	8	-7	0

July 15th

(United States) USA South Panthers	8–5	Saint Lucia

University of the West Indies

July 15th

(United States) USA South Panthers	29–0	Cayman Islands

University of the West Indies

July 15th

Cayman Islands	8–19	Saint Lucia

University of the West Indies

=== Day 2 ===
==== Semi-finals ====
July 16th

Jamaica	43–0	Saint Lucia

University of the West Indies

July 16th

(United States) USA South Panthers	20–5	Trinidad and Tobago

University of the West Indies

July 16th

Dominican Republic	5–7	Cayman Islands

University of the West Indies

==== Finals ====
July 16th

Saint Lucia	10–15	Dominican Republic

University of the West Indies

July 16th

Trinidad and Tobago	25–12	Cayman Islands

University of the West Indies

==== Championship final ====
July 16th

Jamaica	14–17	(United States) USA South Panthers

University of the West Indies

== Broadcaster ==
Rugby Americas North announced that SportsMax TV would be broadcasting the competition.
