= 2019 RAN Women's 10s =

2019 RAN Women’s 10s
Tournament details
- Host: Barbados
- Venue: Bellevue Plantation & Polo Club, St. Michael
- Date: 19 July 2019–20 July 2019
- Teams: 8

Final positions
- Champions: Mexico
- Runner-up: Jamaica

Tournament statistics
- Matches played: 24

The 2019 RAN Women’s 10s was the fourth edition of the rugby tens championship and was hosted by Barbados at the Bellevue Plantation & Polo Club in St. Michael from July 19th to the 20th. Eight teams competed at the tournament and were grouped into two pools of four teams. Based on their standings they would then advance into a finals playoffs. Mexico were the newly crowned champions after defeating Jamaica 22–0 in the final.

== Teams ==
- (United States) USA Rugby South
- Saint Lucia
- Trinidad and Tobago
- Curaçao
- Jamaica
- Mexico
- Dominican Republic
- Barbados

== Pool Stage ==
=== Pool A ===
Place	Team	P	W	D	L	PF	PA	PD	TF	TA	TD	Pts.
1	(United States) USA Rugby South	3	3	0	0	124	10	114	18	2	16	9
2	Saint Lucia	3	2	0	1	74	22	52	14	4	10	6
3	Trinidad and Tobago	3	1	0	2	46	62	-16	8	8	0	3
4	Curaçao	3	0	0	3	0	150	-150	0	26	-26	0

July 19

(United States) USA Rugby South	17–10	Saint Lucia

Bellevue Plantation & Polo Club, Saint Michael

July 19

Trinidad and Tobago	41–0	Curaçao

Bellevue Plantation & Polo Club, Saint Michael

July 19

(United States) USA Rugby South	60–0	Curaçao

Bellevue Plantation & Polo Club, Saint Michael

July 19

Trinidad and Tobago	5–17	Saint Lucia

Bellevue Plantation & Polo Club, Saint Michael

July 19

(United States) USA Rugby South	45–0	Trinidad and Tobago

Bellevue Plantation & Polo Club, Saint Michael

July 19

Saint Lucia	47–0	Curaçao

Bellevue Plantation & Polo Club, Saint Michael

=== Pool B ===
Place	Team	P	W	D	L	PF	PA	PD	TF	TA	TD	Pts.
1	Jamaica	3	2	1	0	77	19	58	13	3	10	7
2	Mexico	3	2	1	0	55	17	38	10	3	7	7
3	Dominican Republic	3	1	0	2	34	34	0	6	6	0	3
4	Barbados	3	0	0	3	12	108	-96	2	19	-17	0

July 19

Jamaica	29–0	Dominican Republic

Bellevue Plantation & Polo Club, Saint Michael

July 19

Mexico	38–5	Barbados

Bellevue Plantation & Polo Club, Saint Michael

July 19

Jamaica	36–7	Barbados

Bellevue Plantation & Polo Club, Saint Michael

July 19

Mexico	5–0	Dominican Republic

Bellevue Plantation & Polo Club, Saint Michael

July 19

Jamaica	12–12	Mexico

Bellevue Plantation & Polo Club, Saint Michael

July 19

Dominican Republic	34–0	Barbados

Bellevue Plantation & Polo Club, Saint Michael

== Finals ==
=== Cup Quarter-final ===
Quarter-finals
(United States) USA Rugby South	31
Barbados	5
Mexico	34
Trinidad and Tobago	0
Saint Lucia	20
Dominican Republic	12
Jamaica	36
Curaçao	0

Semi-finals
Mexico	17
(United States) USA Rugby South	10
Jamaica	19
Saint Lucia	0

Cup Final
Mexico	22
Jamaica	0
3rd Place
(United States) USA Rugby South	24
Saint Lucia	0

=== Plate Final ===
Semi-finals
Trinidad and Tobago	5
Barbados	0
Dominican Republic	27
Curaçao	0

Plate Final
Dominican Republic	5
Trinidad and Tobago	0
7th Place
Barbados	27
Curaçao	5
