= 2017 RAN Women's 10s =

2017 RAN Women’s 10s
Tournament details
- Host: United States
- Venue: Vizcaya Park, Miramar, Florida
- Date: 20 July 2017–21 July 2017
- Countries: United States; Trinidad and Tobago; Mexico; Jamaica
- Teams: 4

Final positions
- Champions: Trinidad and Tobago
- Runner-up: United States

Tournament statistics
- Matches played: 8

The 2017 RAN Women’s 10s was the second edition of the ten-a-side competition and was hosted at Miramar, Florida from July 20th to the 21st. It was held over two days at Vizcaya Park and was part of Rugby Americas North (RAN) Super Week. After two rounds of competition the top two teams played each other in the finals for first place, while the bottom teams played for third. Trinidad & Tobago won the Women’s 10’s title after beating USA Rugby South 15–0 in the final.

== Table ==
Rank	Team	P	W	D	L	PF	PA	+/-
1	(United States) USA Rugby South	3	3	0	0	41	19	22
2	Trinidad and Tobago	3	2	0	1	37	29	8
3	Mexico	3	1	0	2	21	14	7
4	Jamaica	3	0	0	3	19	41	-22

== Matches ==
=== Round 1 ===
20 July

(United States) USA Rugby South	17–7	Trinidad and Tobago

Vizcaya Park, Miramar, Florida

20 July

Mexico	14–7	Jamaica

Vizcaya Park, Miramar, Florida

20 July

Trinidad and Tobago	20–7	Mexico

Vizcaya Park, Miramar, Florida

20 July

(United States) USA Rugby South	17–7	Jamaica

Vizcaya Park, Miramar, Florida

=== Round 2 ===
21 July

Trinidad and Tobago	10–5	Jamaica

Vizcaya Park, Miramar, Florida

21 July

(United States) USA Rugby South	7–5	Mexico

Vizcaya Park, Miramar, Florida

== Finals ==
21 July

Jamaica	12–5	Mexico

Vizcaya Park, Miramar, Florida

21 July

Trinidad and Tobago	15–0	(United States) USA Rugby South

Vizcaya Park, Miramar, Florida
