= 2018 RAN Women's 10s =

2018 RAN Women’s 10s
Tournament details
- Host: Mexico
- Venue: Mexico City
- Date: 12 July 2018–13 July 2018
- Countries: Mexico; United States; Jamaica; Bahamas
- Teams: 4

Final positions
- Champions: United States
- Runner-up: Jamaica

Tournament statistics
- Matches played: 8

The 2018 RAN Women’s 10s was the third edition of the women's rugby tens tournament that was hosted by Mexico at Mexico City from July 12 to 13. USA South were undefeated in the tournament, they eventually won the championship after beating Jamaica 19–12 in the final.

== Table ==
Rank	Team	P	W	D	L	PF	PA	PD
1	(United States) USA South	3	3	0	0	119	19	100
2	Jamaica	3	2	0	1	51	34	17
3	Mexico	3	1	0	2	42	50	-8
4	Bahamas	3	0	0	3	22	91	-69

== Matches ==
=== Day 1 ===
12 July

(United States) USA South	48–0	Bahamas

Mexico City

12 July

Mexico	14–17	Jamaica

Mexico City

12 July

Jamaica	29–15	Bahamas

Mexico City

12 July

Mexico	14–26	(United States) USA South

Mexico City

=== Day 2 ===
13 July

Mexico	14–7	Bahamas

Mexico City

13 July

Jamaica	5–45	(United States) USA South

Mexico City

== Finals ==
13 July

Mexico	26–0	Bahamas

Mexico City

13 July

(United States) USA South	19–12	Jamaica

Mexico City
