= 2016 RAN Women's 10s =

2016 RAN Women’s 10s
Tournament details
- Host: United States
- Venue: Vizcaya Park, Miramar, Florida
- Date: 14 July 2016–15 July 2016
- Countries: United States; Jamaica; Trinidad and Tobago; Bahamas
- Teams: 4

Final positions
- Champions: United States
- Runner-up: Trinidad and Tobago

Tournament statistics
- Matches played: 8

The 2016 RAN Women’s 10s was the inaugural tournament of the women's ten-a-side competition and was hosted at Miami, Florida from July 14th to the 15th. USA Rugby South Panthers were the inaugural champions after defeating Trinidad and Tobago in the final 31–22.

== Table ==
Rank	Team	P	W	D	L	PF	PA	+/-
1	(United States) USA Rugby South Panthers	3	3	0	0	65	22	43
2	Trinidad and Tobago	3	2	0	1	61	36	25
3	Bahamas	3	1	0	2	32	78	-46
4	Jamaica	3	0	0	3	36	58	-22

== Matches ==
=== Round 1 ===
14 July

(United States) USA Rugby South Panthers	17–10	Trinidad and Tobago

Vizcaya Park, Miramar, Florida

14 July

Bahamas	20–17	Jamaica

Vizcaya Park, Miramar, Florida

14 July

Trinidad and Tobago	27–12	Bahamas

Vizcaya Park, Miramar, Florida

14 July

(United States) USA Rugby South Panthers	14–12	Jamaica

Vizcaya Park, Miramar, Florida

=== Round 2 ===
15 July

Trinidad and Tobago	24–7	Jamaica

Vizcaya Park, Miramar, Florida

15 July

(United States) USA Rugby South Panthers	34–0	Bahamas

Vizcaya Park, Miramar, Florida

== Finals ==
15 July

Jamaica	27–0	Bahamas

Vizcaya Park, Miramar, Florida

15 July

(United States) USA Rugby South Panthers	31–22	Trinidad and Tobago

Vizcaya Park, Miramar, Florida
