= 2010 NACRA Women's Rugby Championship =

Tournament details
- Host: Bahamas
- Venue: Nassau, Bahamas
- Date: 15 August 2010– 21 August 2010
- Countries: Bahamas; Cayman Islands; Canada; United States
- Teams: 4

Final positions
- Champions: Canada

Tournament statistics
- Matches played: 4

The 2010 NACRA Women's Rugby Championship was the first tournament hosted by the Bahamas. It was a significant departure from previous events, which had featured only teams from English-speaking West Indies. For the first time, USA and Canada sent their U20 teams - however, again financial problems restricted the participation of most island teams, with the exception of the Cayman Islands. The result was a three-way NACRA tournament. The Caymans also played hosts The Bahamas for the Caribbean title.

A Caribbean Select XV (with players coming from Trinidad & Tobago (T&T), Guyana, Jamaica, Barbados, British Virgin Islands, and St Vincent and The Grenadines) also played non-tournament games against the USA, Canada and Bahamas.

The tournament took place at the Winton Rugby Centre, Nassau, from 15–21 August. Canada U20 defeated USA U20 6–3 to win the Championship.

== Table ==
Pos	Team	Pld	W	D	L	PF	PA	PD	Pts
1	Canada U20	2	2	0	0	68	3	+65	9
2	United States U20	2	1	0	1	88	6	+82	6
3	Cayman Islands	2	0	0	2	0	147	−147	0

== Results ==
2010-08-15

Cayman Islands	0-85 (Note: NACRA match report: In a free scoring game, USA U20 romped away to an easy win courtesy of a 13 try spree, with Garber bagging a hat trick. McKnight and Johnson both scored a couple each with further tries being added by Baravilala, Bowlus, Anderson, Barley, Sherman and Hathaway. A fine kicking display from Garber (6 conversions) and Baravilala (4 conversions), rounded off the natch for the USA, who ran excellent lines throughout and attacked with pace at all times. Judging from the first two matches of the opening day's play, Canada U20 may need to raise their game if they are to defeat an impressive looking USA U20 in the final match on Friday evening.)	United States U20

Nassau, Bahamas

2010-08-17

Canada U20	62-0 (Note: NACRA match report: In the 5.00 p.m. match Canada ran out easy 62-0 winners over a Cayman team, which struggled through injuries. Canada scored 31 points in the first half through ties from Croteau, Mackinnon, Murphy-Burke, Beazley and Maric, with Murphy-Burke adding 3 conversions. The second half was pretty much one way traffic as the heat and injuries took toll on the Cayman team. Willoughby opened the second half scoring with an early try which Murphy-Burke converted. Further tris from Murphy-Burke, McNally, Beazley and Anderson, with Murphy-Burke kicking a further 2 conversions took the final score to 62–0. All eyes now are on the Friday evening match between USA U20 and Canada U20.)	Cayman Islands

Nassau, Bahamas

2010-08-20

Canada U20	6-3 (Note: NACRA match report: In thrilling and intense final match of the NACRA Women's 15s Championship, Canada edged their North American rivals 6–3 to take the trophy. Both sides played with passion and pride, choosing to run the ball at every opportune time, rather than kick for territory. At half time the game was stalemate at 0–0 and it was not until the 6th minute of the second half when USA took the lead via a Chelsea Garber penalty. Laura Murphy-Burke equalised with a penalty for Canada after 12 minutes and it was not until the closing minutes of the match when Misha Maric kicked a penalty for Canada to ensure the victory.)	United States U20

Nassau, Bahamas

== Caribbean Championship ==
Following the NACRA tournament, the two individual Caribbean entrants played off for the Caribbean title. Cayman Islands secured their first Caribbean Championship with a comfortable win. Two early tries from centre Lolitta Hanna provided Cayman with an early 10 point lead and further tries from Lisa Bird and Emily Davies and a katie Bayles conversion gave Cayman a commanding 22-0 half time lead. Second tries for Bird and Hanna and one each for Kehoe and Lawrence with Bayles adding 3 more conversion rounded off Cayman's 48-0 victory.

2010-08-21

Bahamas	0–48	Cayman Islands

Nassau, Bahamas
