= 2024 RAN Women's Rugby Championship =

2024 RAN Women's Championship
Tournament details
- Host: Mexico
- Venue: FC Total, Querétaro
- Date: 11–14 July 2024
- Teams: 3

Final positions
- Champions: United States
- Runner-up: Mexico

Tournament statistics
- Matches played: 3

2024 RAN Women's Rugby Championship is the eighth edition of the competition since the return of women's fifteen-a-side rugby last year. The tournament took place from 11 to 14 July 2024 at FC Total in Querétaro, Mexico.

== Teams ==
Only three teams competed in the tournament. Jamaica did not participate in this year’s event due to complications caused by Hurricane Beryl.

- Mexico
- Trinidad and Tobago
- USA South

== Format ==
Matches on days 1 and 2 were played in two halves of 20 minutes each, except for the Finals where each team played a full 80-minute game. The match between Trinidad and Tobago and Mexico was an international Test Match for World Rugby Ranking points and was Mexico’s first-ever international test match.

== Table ==
Pos	Team	P	W	D	L	PF	PA	PD	BP	Pts
1	USA South	2	2	0	0	66	33	+33	0	0
2	Mexico	2	1	0	1	50	25	+25	0	0
3	Trinidad and Tobago	2	0	0	2	10	0	–68	0	0

== Fixtures ==
=== Day 1 ===
10 July 2024
11:30 CST (UTC-6)

Trinidad and Tobago	10–42	USA South
Try: Leah Kintiba c Con: Angel Jorsling; Pen: Angel Jorsling; Cards: Quaneisha Oliver (red card)		Try: Callie Woods m Alyssa Tavarez m Cyndi Campbell m Tonia Oneill c April Williams (2) m, m Morgan Freeman c Con: Cyndi Campbell; Morgan Freeman; Pen: Cyndi Campbell; Cards: Keki Jordan (yellow card)

FC Total, Querétaro

=== Day 2 ===
11 July 2024
11:30 CST (UTC-6)

Mexico	23–25	USA South
Try: Aimée Athena Ramos c Nely Cano c Con: Aimée Athena Ramos (2); Pen: Aimée Athena Ramos (3)		Try: Morgan Freeman m Tonia Oneill m Tiara Littleton m Gabby Colasurdo c Con: Cyndi Campbell; Pen: Cyndi Campbell; Cards: Christine Sargeant (yellow card)

FC Total, Querétaro
Referee: Kanisha Vincent (TTRFU)

=== Day 3 ===
14 July 2024
12:00 CST (UTC-6)

Mexico	27–0	Trinidad and Tobago
Try: Alessandra Bender 16' m Aimée Ramos 25' c Isabela González 40' c Nely Cano 66' m Con: Aimée Ramos (2) 26', 40'; Pen: Aimée Ramos 7'; Cards: Mayte Arias (yellow card) 55' to 65'	Report

FC Total, Querétaro
Referee: Lindsey Oliver (USA)
