= 2009 NAWIRA Women's Rugby Championship =

Tournament details
- Host: Barbados
- Date: 21 June 2009– 27 June 2009
- Countries: Trinidad and Tobago; Cayman Islands; Barbados; Saint Vincent and the Grenadines
- Teams: 4

Final positions
- Champions: Trinidad and Tobago

Tournament statistics
- Matches played: 6
- Tries scored: 65 (10.83 per match)

The 2009 NAWIRA Women's Rugby Championship was a 15 a-side championship that was hosted by the Barbados Rugby Union, it was held between June 21 and 27 at the Garrison Savannah, Bridgetown, Barbados.

According to NAWIRA competing teams were expected to be Barbados, Guyana, Trinidad & Tobago, Cayman Islands, Jamaica, and St Vincent & the Grenadines. However, Guyana - the favourites - withdrew a few weeks before the tournament citing financial difficulties, and Jamaica then withdrew on the eve of the event for similar reasons. The result was a very one-sided affair, with Trinidad retaining their title without conceding a point.

The tournament included test match debuts for both Barbados and St Vincent - and for both it was a painful introduction to the game. Barbados were blown away by the Caymans in their opening game - the visitors being "just too big and rough for [Barbados'] young inexperienced side" while their second game ended early due to injury.

St Vincent's debut was not different. In their opening game "the scrums went uncontested after about ten minutes as they just could not cope with the pressure. As it was they had some nasty injuries, so that made things even worse".

== Table ==
Pos	Team	Pld	W	D	L	PF	PA	PD	Pts
1	Trinidad and Tobago	3	3	0	0	216	0	+216	9
2	Cayman Islands	3	2	0	1	130	51	+79	7
3	Barbados	3	1	0	2	52	132	−80	5
4	Saint Vincent and the Grenadines	3	0	0	3	0	215	−215	3

== Results ==
2009-06-21	Barbados	3 - 54	Cayman Islands	Bridgetown, Barbados
	Pen: Karen Holmes		Try: Olive McDonagh (3); Jessica Lane (2); Lolita Hanna; Karen Hart; Lisa Bird; Lisa Kehoe; Rowena Lawrence (1); Con: Olive McDonagh (2)

2009-06-21	Trinidad and Tobago	90 - 0	St Vincent	Bridgetown, Barbados
	Try: Jenilee Limada (6); Kwanize John (5); Juliana Straker (2); Ebony Young; Kalisha Del Potro; Lee Hay (1); Con: Juliana Straker (3); Merlin Blackford (2)

2009-06-24	Barbados	0 - 78	Trinidad and Tobago	Bridgetown, Barbados
			Try: Kwanieze John (5); Juliana Straker (2); Merlin Blackford; Dalia Jordan-Brown; Kalisha Del Peche; Abigail Roberts; Jenilee Limada; Ebony YoungJamila Garcia; Con: Juliana Straker (2); Merlin Blackford (2)

2009-06-24	Cayman Islands	76 - 0	St Vincent	Bridgetown, Barbados
	Try: Karen Hart (3); Lolleta Hanna; Lisa Kehoe (2); Olive McDonagh; Jane Robson; Cindy Blekaitis; Joanne Ziegler; Krista Pell; Jessica Lane; Latoya Bariffe; Con: Lolleta Hanna (3)

2009-06-27	Barbados	49-0	St Vincent	Bridgetown, Barbados
	Try: Karen Holmes (4); Sophie Bannister (2); Danielle Phillips; Cherice Hart; Dara Watts; Con: Karen Holmes (2)

2009-06-27	Trinidad and Tobago	48-0	Cayman Islands	Bridgetown, Barbados
	Try: Kaleisha Delpeche (2); Kwaneize John; Tramaine Andrews; Ebony Young; Latoya Young; Dalia Jordon Brown; Abigail Roberts (1); Con: Julianna Straker (3); Merlin Blackford (1)
