= 2006 NAWIRA Women's Rugby Championship =

Tournament details
- Host: Jamaica
- Venue: Kingston
- Date: 28–30 September 2006
- Countries: Guyana; Trinidad and Tobago; Jamaica

Final positions
- Champions: Jamaica
- Runner-up: Guyana

The 2006 NAWIRA Women's Rugby Championship was the second edition of the tournament. It was held in Kingston, Jamaica from the 28th to the 30th of September. Jamaica won the championship, it was their first title win.

== Final table ==
Pos	Team	P	W	D	L	PF	PA	PD	Pts
1	Jamaica	2	1	0	1	32	6	26	5
2	Guyana	2	1	0	1	14	20	-6	5
3	Trinidad and Tobago	2	1	0	1	15	35	-20	5

== Results ==
28 September 2006	Jamaica	5–6	Guyana	Mona Bowl, Kingston
16:00 JAM (UTC-5)	Try: Kadian Gayle		Pen: Andrea Lashley (2)

30 September 2006	Guyana	8–15	Trinidad and Tobago	Mona Bowl, Kingston
16:00 JAM (UTC-5)	Try: Delica Ferdinand 73' m Pen: Andrea Lashley 46'		Try: Jenilee Limada 12' m Angela Joseph-Darceuil 29' m Jamilah Garcia 72' m

2 October 2006	Jamaica	27–0	Trinidad and Tobago	Mona Bowl, Kingston
16:00 JAM (UTC-5)	Try: Kadian Gayle (2) 32', 80'; Sherene Johnson 40'; Mitsy Stewart 44'; Annakay Morris 62'; Con: Annakay Morris
