= Rugby union in Trinidad and Tobago =

- Country: Trinidad and Tobago
- Governing body: Trinidad and Tobago Rugby Football Union
- National team: Trinidad and Tobago
- First played: 1922
- Registered players: 4,457
- Clubs: 13

National competitions
- Rugby World Cup; Rugby World Cup Sevens; IRB Sevens World Series

Club competitions
- Caribbean Sevens

Rugby union in Trinidad and Tobago is a popular sport. There are currently 4,457 registered players, and 13 clubs. They are currently ranked 48th (Men's) and 34th (Women's) in the world.

The governing body is the Trinidad and Tobago Rugby Football Union (TTRFU).

== History ==
The first record of rugby union being played in Trinidad and Tobago dates to the expatriate community in 1922.

The game remained confined to this community until the late 1960s when an emphasis on schools development began. This period declined by the end of the 1970s and was not renewed until 1990 in 12 schools.

Trinidad and Tobago has 13 clubs including the teams of the police and the Army.

Trinidad and Tobago participated in the Qualifying Round of the 1997 Rugby World Cup Sevens. They went on to host and win the first ever Caribbean Zone Rugby World Cup Sevens qualifying tournament in January 2000 at the Hasely Crawford Stadium. In XV aside, the participated in qualifying for the 1999, 2003, 2007 and 2011 Rugby World Cup finals. They failed to qualify on each occasion.

Trinidad and Tobago participated in the inaugural Rugby Sevens at the 1998 Commonwealth Games held in Kuala Lumpur, Malaysia.

Trinidad and Tobago competes in the Caribbean Championship, a tournament which includes Bermuda, Martinique, the Cayman Islands, Jamaica, the Bahamas, British Virgin Islands, Antigua and Guyana. Trinidad and Tobago has entered every Caribbean Rugby Championship since inception in 1966 and have won in 1967, 1973, 1983, 1985 and 1997 and the inaugural south Caribbean Rugby Championship in 1999.

Trinidad and Tobago are one of the founding members of the Caribbean Rugby Football Union, which was formed in 1975 and is now called the West Indies Rugby Union. The Caribbean nation hosts the Caribbean Sevens annually on the first weekend in December.

== Notable players ==
- Delon Armitage
- Steffon Armitage
- Selwyn St. Bernard

== See also ==
- Trinidad and Tobago national rugby union team
- Trinidad and Tobago Rugby Football Union
- Trinidad and Tobago national rugby sevens team
- Trinidad and Tobago women's national rugby union team
