= Rugby union in Jamaica =

- Country: Jamaica
- Governing body: Jamaica Rugby Football Union
- National team: Jamaica
- Registered players: 2,090
- Clubs: 21

National competitions
- Rugby World Cup; Rugby World Cup Sevens; IRB Sevens World Series

Rugby union in Jamaica is a minor but growing sport. They are currently ranked 67th by World Rugby, with 2,090 registered players. Rugby union in Jamaica is governed by the Jamaica Rugby Football Union.

== History ==
Rugby was first introduced into Jamaica by the British. Much of the competition is with neighbouring Caribbean islands, visiting ships and touring sides.

Jamaica competes in the Caribbean Championship, a tournament which includes Trinidad and Tobago, Bermuda, Martinique, the Cayman Islands, the Bahamas, British Virgin Islands, Antigua and Guyana.

Jamaica were the most surprising union to announce an interest in hosting the 2019 Rugby World Cup, considering they had never participated in a previous event. The initiative was withdrawn soon after being proposed.

== See also ==
- Jamaica national rugby union team
- Caribbean Women’s Rugby Championship
