= Mexican Rugby Federation =

Sport governing organization in Mexico

Federación Mexicana de Rugby
- Sport: Rugby union
- Founded: 1973 as Unión Mexicana de Rugby
- World Rugby affiliation: 2006
- RAN affiliation: 2003
- President: Francisco Echeguren
- Men's coach: Ruben Duque, Simon Pierre
- Women's coach: Nicolas Utrilla
- Website: www.mexrugby.com

The Mexican Rugby Federation (Spanish: Federación Mexicana de Rugby, FMR or FMRU) is the governing body for rugby union in Mexico. The FMRU organizes rugby in the country: a championship takes place at the highest level in the country, and in the same way organizes championship tournaments for youth, veterans and women.

== History ==
The Englishman Walter Irvine founded the "Unión Mexicana de Rugby A.C." (UMR) in 1973 to organise and develop rugby union in Mexico. The UMR was the body directing Mexican rugby union for thirty years.

The Federación Mexicana de Rugby was founded in October 2003. In November 2003 the FMR was made an associate member of the International Rugby Board, now known as World Rugby. Mexico could thus take part in competitions organised by the supreme authority of rugby on a world level. Full membership followed in 2006.

At the beginning of 2007, the Mexican Olympic Committee recognized the FMR as an affiliate member.

== National teams ==
The FMRU organizes several national teams that participate in international competitions:

- Mexico national rugby union team
- Mexico women's national rugby union team
- Mexico national rugby sevens team
- Mexico women's national rugby sevens team

== See also ==
- Rugby union in Mexico
- Rugby Americas North Championship
