= St. Vincent and the Grenadines Rugby Union =

Governing body for rugby union in St. Vincent and the Grenadines

- Sport: Rugby union
- Founded: 1998
- World Rugby affiliation: 2003
- Rugby Americas North affiliation: 1998
- Website: svgrugby.com/

Saint Vincent and the Grenadines Rugby Union is the governing body for rugby union in Saint Vincent and the Grenadines. It is considered a Tier 3 rugby nation by World Rugby of which it is a full member. It is also a member of the Rugby Americas North (RAN). Saint Vincent and the Grenadines men's and women's teams compete regionally against other teams in this group.

== History ==
The St. Vincent and the Grenadines Rugby Union (SVGRU) came into existence on Sunday 18 January 1998, when the first game of touch rugby was played at the Sion Hill playing field using four traffic cones as pitch markers.

It all came about following a chance conversation. This stimulated an expatriate Englishman, John Townend, to return form his Christmas vacation in 1997 with plenty of enthusiasm and two rugby balls. John Townend contacted two Antipodean expatriates: Kelly Glass, a highly accomplished rugby player from South Island, New Zealand, and Geoff Hyde, an Australian tourism adviser, suggesting a game of touch rugby the following Sunday morning. There were seven players at the first game: Carver Alexander, Ernst De Freitas, Kelly Glass, Kirk Hobson-Garcia, Geoff Hyde, John Townend and Delon Williams, a local Rastafarian who later became known as "Speedy".

After playing for two hours, the group retired to Villa Beach with a crate of beer, to re-hydrate (any excuse would do) and to soothe aching muscles in the sea. Rugby had been introduced to St. Vincent.

From the early days there was a strong interest from girls, who took an instant liking to the idea of "touch" rugby. The games then continued every Sunday, and it was soon found that between Kirk, Kelly, Andrew, and Scott Hadley that there were already some excellent and accomplished players on the island. In addition, they were able to attract other good players, namely Derek Hadley who was visiting from Australia and Father Pope Faifal from Samoa, working with the Catholic mission. In terms of the girls, Jackie De Freitas soon joined, together with some Canadian volunteers, namely Janice Madill and Lisa Lilajehto. One other girl who was to become a big favourite was Loretta "Hot Lips" Skrok. She became notorious for her trick of taking a swig of strong rum and “flame throwing” at parties. Peace Corps Volunteers Becky Buster and Maria Caluag also became great team members. The local ranks were swelled by the contribution of Lorna "Turbo" Williams from Overland in the Carib community, Delia King from Calliaqua and Yvonne Bakker from Kingstown.

In the early days they were definitely seen as an expatriate group of Americans, Australians, British, Canadians, New Zealanders, Trinidadians, Samoans, and a few Vincentians. Rugby was definitely perceived as a white man's sport and a relatively rough game at that. It was soon expanded to playing on Wednesday afternoons as the numbers rose and transferred Sunday practices to Saturday. Despite the expatriate character it was the Vincentians, notably Andrew Hadley and Jackie De Freitas who took the early lead in developing the club, with help from Geoff Hyde.

SVG Rugby has a significant history of developing home grown talent. In the amateur era the female structure was highly successful, producing a large number of first team players and internationals. In the transition to the professional era it was recognized that a clear development program was needed to develop "complete" players capable of playing professional rugby at the highest level. A key difference between amateur and professional rugby is the physical demands placed on players.

They decided to call the team Amazona Guildingii after the rare and graceful Vincentian parrot, and selected the national colours of green, yellow and blue for their jerseys and shorts. Soon afterwards those that could afford it, purchased their own uniforms. Their motto is to "Strive to excellence and keep on striving til the end."

== Women's rugby ==
History was made on Sunday 6 December 1998 at 4:30 p.m., when at the International Caribbean Rugby Seven a Side Competition in Trinidad, a ladies team from St. Vincent and the Grenadines defeated a ladies team representing the mighty Trinidad and Tobago.

It is believed this is the first time in the Caribbean that Ladies have played the full contact game of Rugby Union at International Level. Starting in January 1998 when the game of touch rugby was introduced into these islands on Sunday mornings at the Sion Hill Playing Field by the National Sports Council.

From being 19–0 up at half time, the St. Vincent Ladies team resplendent in the blue, green and yellow colours of their team, the Amazona Guildingii, (named after the St. Vincent Parrot) ran out eventual winners by 29 points to 12. The Trinidadians, with much greater resources, put on a stronger team in the second half, but the Vincy girls soon closed them down and went further ahead.

Though the whole team played well that day, but one person, Lorna "Turbo" Williams of Overland was central at scrum half. She made several tackles, and every time "Turbo "got the ball, it was clear a try was in the making. Eventually she ran in two tries, Janice Madill at hooker ran in two, and Becky Buster in the centre burst through for the fifth try for the Amazona Guildingii’s. Becky also converted two tries, with fine drop kicks over the cross bar.

Others who deserve praise for ferocious tackling and fine ball handling skills include; Jackie de Freitas (prop), Delhia King (wing) from Biabou (who performed four citizens arrests during the match). Other members of the team who performed well were Maria Caluag (centre), Loretta Skrok (prop) and a couple of "ringers" who joined in on the day; Sarah from Sweden and Tracy from New Orleans.

The team was captained by Yvonne Bakker (wing) who kept her composure throughout the game, and if it wasn't for the rather short dead ball line, would also have been credited with a try.

However, since the inception of the founding women's team, there has been a steady decline in interest among women. Unfortunately, the team has ceased to exist.

== Rugby League ==
In the continual effort to increase interest in and awareness of rugby, in addition to maintaining interest in the sport, SVG Rugby have reinstated the Saturday Rugby League. One Saturday a month, the SVG RUwill host seven a-side rugby matches in different communities.

The Rugby League serves as a platform for growing the game, by showcasing the sport of rugby in communities throughout Mainland St. Vincent, while allowing newcomers to see and participate in rugby. The Rugby League also provides existing members with regular outlets for healthy competition, garnering continued interest in rugby.

To date, league team names are:

- Country: Pirates
- Central/town: Sharks
- Leeward: Unrulies
- Canouan: All Blacks

== Grassroots Rugby Programme ==
Youth rugby in St. Vincent was once an unstoppable force. SVG Rugby had a very successful U19 team. In recent years, the youth programme has lost momentum. However, with the election of a new executive board, the Grassroots Rugby Programme is back.

Executive

- President: Sophie Goddard
- Vice- President: Kelly Glass
- Co Vice President: John Townend
- Treasurer: Gary Blackman
- Secretary: Valarie Pelletier
- Assistant Secretary: Leonard Matthews
- Public Relations Officer: Kemi Francois
- U19's Public Relations Officer: Nixon McAllister
- Sponsorship Director: Jake Heimann
- Team Manager: Guy Hadley
- Club Coach: Hendrikus Wentzel
- League Coordinator: Kemi Francois
- U19's Men's captain: Benson Nanton
- Men's captain: Andrew Phillips

The SVG Rugby Grassroots Rugby Programme aims to promote rugby development, team play, and sportsmanship for school age and out-of-school age youth and has established teams in various schools and communities throughout St. Vincent.

The Grassroots Rugby Programme focuses on Rookie Rugby, or tag rugby. Tag rugby is a fun, easy to play, non-contact rugby game that is designed as an introduction to teach the basic skills and techniques needed to play competitive rugby in the future.

SVG Rugby worked with World Rugby to implement the Get Into Rugby youth initiative.

== Matches and results ==
The first game ever played was against the British Royal Navy destroyer HMS Newcastle, on 8 February 1998. The game was won by the home side.

Saint Vincent and the Grenadines attempted to qualify for the 2007 Rugby World Cup in France, playing the first match of the Americas qualifying tournament. They played a preliminary qualifier against Saint Lucia in May 2005. The winner would progress to the South Pool of Round 1a, however, Saint Lucia won the match 36–25.

On 29 March 2008, Saint Vincent was defeated by Mexico 47–7 in a pre-qualifier for the right to enter the NAWIRA region qualifying process for Rugby World Cup 2011.
