= Time in Jamaica =

Jamaica Time (JAM) is the official time in Jamaica. It is five hours behind Coordinated Universal Time (UTC−05:00). Jamaica has only one time zone and does not observe daylight saving time. During winter, Jamaican Time is equivalent to North American Eastern Standard Time, whereas in the summer it is equivalent to Central Daylight Time.

Jamaica under Michael Manley introduced daylight saving time on January 5, 1974 in response to the 1970s energy crisis. The country changed its clock at the same time as the United States in subsequent years. Jamaica continued observing daylight saving time until this practice was abolished by the government of Edward Seaga by the end of 1983.

== IANA time zone database ==
In the IANA time zone database Jamaica has the following time zone:

- America/Jamaica (JM)
