= 2008 NAWIRA Women's Rugby Championship =

Tournament details
- Host: Guyana
- Venue: Georgetown
- Date: 5 April 2008–10 April 2008
- Countries: Guyana; Trinidad and Tobago; Jamaica; Cayman Islands
- Teams: 4

Final positions
- Champions: Trinidad and Tobago
- Runner-up: Guyana

Tournament statistics
- Matches played: 6

The 2008 NAWIRA Women's Rugby Championship was hosted by Guyana from the 5th to the 10th of April at Georgetown. Trinidad and Tobago reclaimed the Caribbean title.

== Table ==
Pos	Team	P	W	D	L	PF	PA	PD	Pts
1	Trinidad and Tobago	3	2	1	0	96	15	81	8
2	Guyana	3	2	1	0	59	15	44	8
3	Jamaica	3	1	0	2	32	32	0	5
4	Cayman Islands	3	0	0	3	7	132	-125	3

== Results ==
=== Round 1 ===
5 May 2008	Guyana	41–0	Cayman Islands	Georgetown

5 May 2008	Jamaica	10–12	Trinidad and Tobago	Georgetown

=== Round 2 ===
7 May 2008	Cayman Islands	7–12	Jamaica	Georgetown

7 May 2008	Guyana	5–5	Trinidad and Tobago	Georgetown

=== Round 3 ===
10 May 2008	Cayman Islands	0–79	Trinidad and Tobago	Georgetown
			Try: Julianna Staker (3); Alicia Edgar (2); Abigail Roberts (2); Kwanzie John (2); Latoya Edwards (2); Con: Julianna Staker (6)

10 May 2008	Guyana	13–10	Jamaica	Georgetown
	Try: Theresa Torres; Con: Andrea Lashley; Pen: Andrea Lashley; Collette Hope		Try: Penalty Try; Pen: Anna-Kay Morrison
