= 2011 NACRA Women's Rugby Championship =

Tournament details
- Host: Cayman Islands
- Venue: Grand Cayman
- Date: 10 July 2011– 15 July 2011
- Countries: Cayman Islands; Trinidad and Tobago; Jamaica (Caribbean Community) Caribbean Select XV
- Teams: 4

Final positions
- Champions: Trinidad and Tobago

Tournament statistics
- Top scorer(s): (Trinidad and Tobago) Juliana Straker (57 points)
- Most tries: (Trinidad and Tobago) Juliana Straker (9 tries)

The 2011 NACRA Women's Rugby Championship was the second tournament, hosted by the Cayman Islands, saw the return to competition of island teams from Trinidad and Tobago, Jamaica and hosts, the Cayman Islands; but no teams from outside the Caribbean, possibly because the tournament clashed with the U20 Nations Cup. Other islands were again represented by a Caribbean Select XV. (Note: 2011 Caribbean Select squad: Bermuda: Anna Knapman-Scott; Emma Msowoya Mexico: Samara Yael Tuyu Salcedo; Daniela Carolina Arellano Lopez Barbados: Cherisse Harte; Karen Holmes Guyana: Nicole Nero; Sabola Gray; Grace Jarvis British Virgin Islands: Cassandra Molver; Christine Nissen Saint Vincent & the Grenadines: Josephine Charles; Shervonne Cato; Alexia Glasgow Saint Lucia: Marline Cherry; Gezel Frederick; Renatta Fredericks Bahamas: Alex Mackey; Bronia Beckford; Morganna Thurston Curaçao: Vianelly Raven; Gilliany Eustatius) For the first time, all matches in the tournament were streamed live by Cayman Rugby TV. Trinidad and Tobago won the Championship as they went undefeated in the competition.

== Table ==
Pos	Team	Pld	W	D	L	PF	PA	PD	Pts
1	Trinidad and Tobago	3	3	0	0	179	5	+174	9
2	Jamaica	3	2	0	1	64	62	+2	7
3	Cayman Islands	3	1	0	2	39	77	−38	5
4	(Caribbean Community) Caribbean Select XV	3	0	0	3	25	163	−138	3

== Results ==
2011-07-10

Trinidad and Tobago	92-0	Caribbean Select XV (Caribbean Community)
Tries: Jade Ramjag (2); Alesha Bruce (2); Dalia Jordan-Brown (2); Taliah Wilson (3); Juliana Straker (4); Jenilee Limada; Ayana Skeete; Nicolette Pantor; Cons: Juliana Straker (3); Merlin Blackford (3)

Grand Cayman, Cayman Islands
Referee: Keith Hodgkins (Bermuda)

2011-07-10

Cayman Islands	12-15	Jamaica
Tries: Jo Zeigler; Loletta Hanna; Con: Katie Bayles		Tries: Wendy Parchment; Kadjan Gayle; Cons: Kadjan Gayle; Pens: Kadjan Gayle

Grand Cayman, Cayman Islands
Referee: Alwin Etwah (Guyana)

2011-07-12

Trinidad and Tobago	37-5	Jamaica
Tries: Juliana Straker (3); Sojouner Hyles; Taliah Wilson (2); Dalia Jordan-Brown; Conv: Merlin Blackford		Try: : Misty Stewart

Grand Cayman, Cayman Islands
Referee: Alastair Robertson (Cayman Islands)

2011-07-12

Cayman Islands	27-12	(Caribbean Community) Caribbean Select XV
Tries: : Loletta Hanna (2); Fiona Brader (2); Jesse Lane; Conv: Katie Bayes		Tries: : Melissa Da Ponte; Anna Knapton-Scott; Conv: Karen Holmes

Grand Cayman, Cayman Islands
Referee: Larry Mendez (Trinidad & Tobago)

2011-07-14

Jamaica	44-13	Caribbean Select XV (Caribbean Community)
Tries: : Mitsy Stewart; Dana-Ann Fearon (2); Wendy Parchment (3); Akaylia Gordon; Candice Wright; Conv: Kadjan Gayle (2)		Tries: : Karen Holmes; Grace Jarvis; Pen: Karen Holmes

Grand Cayman, Cayman Islands
Referee: George Nicholson (Barbados)

2011-07-15

Cayman Islands	0-50	Trinidad and Tobago
		Tries: Juliana Straker; Alesha Bruce; Dalia Jordan-Brown; Latoya Edwards; Tenisha Samuel; Talia Wilson; Nicolette Pantor; Cons: Juliana Straker(4); Merlin Blackford

Grand Cayman, Cayman Islands
Referee: Referee: Alwin Etwah (Guyana)

== Scorers ==
Pts.	Player	T	C	P
57	(Trinidad and Tobago) Juliana Straker (Flyhalf)	9	7	
30	(Trinidad and Tobago) Taliah Wilson (Centre)	6		
25	(Trinidad and Tobago) Dalia Jordan-Brown (Wing)	5		
20	(Jamaica) Wendy Parchment	4		
15	(Cayman Islands) Loletta Hanna (Wing)	3		
15	(Trinidad and Tobago) Alesha Bruce (Wing)	3		
14	(Jamaica) Kadjan Gayle (Centre)	1	3	1
10	(Trinidad and Tobago) Jade Ramjag (Flanker)	2		
10	(Cayman Islands) Fiona Brander (Lock)	2		
10	(Jamaica) Misty Stewart (Wing)	2		
10	(Jamaica) Dana-Ann Fearon	2		
10	(Caribbean Community) Karen Holmes	2		
10	(Trinidad and Tobago) Merlin Blackford		5	
5	(Trinidad and Tobago) Tenisha Samuel (Centre)	1		
5	(Cayman Islands) Jo Zeigler (Scrumhalf)	1		
5	(Cayman Islands) Jessica Lane (No. 8)	1		
5	(Caribbean Community) Melissa Da Ponte (Forward)	1		
5	(Caribbean Community) Anna Knapman-Scott	1		
5	(Trinidad and Tobago) Jenilee Limada (No. 8)	1		
5	(Trinidad and Tobago) Ayana Skeete	1		
5	(Trinidad and Tobago) Nicolette Pantor	1		
5	(Trinidad and Tobago) Latoya Edwards (Scrumhalf)	1		
5	(Trinidad and Tobago) Sojouner Hyles (Prop)	1		
5	(Caribbean Community) Grace Jarvis (Scrumhalf)	1		
5	(Jamaica) Akaylia Gordon	1		
5	(Jamaica) Candice Wright	1		
4	(Cayman Islands) Katie Bayles		2	
