= Jamaica Rugby Football Union =

National governing body for the sport of rugby union in Jamaica

- Sport: Rugby union
- Founded: 1946
- World Rugby affiliation: 1996
- RAN affiliation: 2001
- Website: jamaicarugby.org.jm

The Jamaica Rugby Football Union is the national governing body for the sport of rugby union in Jamaica. Its role is to serve as the national governing body charged with achieving and maintaining high levels of quality in all aspects of rugby. The JRFU is a full member of World Rugby (WR) and Rugby America North (RAN). Its chairman is Anthony J. Johnson.
