= Rugby union in Mexico =

- Country: Mexico
- Governing body: Mexican Rugby Federation
- National team: Mexico
- First played: c. 1930

National competitions
- Rugby World Cup; Rugby World Cup Sevens; IRB Sevens World Series

Rugby union in Mexico is a minor but growing sport. Rugby union has a stronger following in Mexico with French communities. The Mexican Rugby Federation (Spanish: Federación Mexicana de Rugby, FMR) is the body directing rugby union in Mexico. It has the responsibility of organising and developing rugby in the country.

Rugby in Mexico comprises 800 players and twenty clubs. Rugby in Mexico is purely amateur, lacking structure and funding. There is no rugby culture and even a regional or local solid foundation.

== History ==
Rugby union was introduced in Mexico for the first time around 1930 by British oil workers. The teams were essentially made up of foreign players. Following the nationalisation of the Mexican oil industry the British left the country and rugby disappeared. In 1971 another Briton, Mr. Walter Irvine, again introduced rugby into the Reformed Athletic Club, an association of British origin.

Walter Irvine founded "Unión Mexicana de Rugby A.C." in 1973 to organise and develop rugby union in Mexico. The "UMR" was the body directing Mexican rugby union until October 2003 when the Federación Mexicana de Rugby (FMR) was founded. In November of that year the FMR was made an associate member of the International Rugby Board. Mexico could thus take part in competitions organised by the supreme authority of rugby on a world level. The FMRU organises rugby in the country: a championship takes place at the highest level in the country, and in the same way organises a championships for youth, veterans and women.

At the beginning of 2007, the Mexican Olympic committee recognized the FMR as an affiliate member. The federation of Mexico is a fully affiliated member of the IRB.

== National team ==
On October the 25th 2007, the Mexican national rugby union team, nicknamed ´Los Serpientes´ (The Snakes), played three unofficial matches, winning one, losing one and drawing the other. The IRB did not recognise these meetings as the administrative checks to ensure that the players were eligible to represent Mexico were not made.

Their first official test match, in March 2008, was a 47-7 victory over Saint Vincent and the Grenadines national team in Rugby World Cup 2011 qualifying. They were eliminated in the quarter-finals by Barbados, by a score of 21-20. Their overall record however was 2-2, finishing 6th place in Round 1A of the Americas qualification zone after defeating hosts the Cayman Islands 13-6 then losing 23-17 to the Bahamas.

=== World Cup record ===
- 1987: not invited
- 1991: did not enter qualification
- 1995: did not enter qualification
- 1999: did not enter qualification
- 2003: did not enter qualification
- 2007: did not enter qualification
- 2011: did not qualify
- 2015: did not qualify
- 2019: did not qualify
- 2023: did not qualify

== Major League Championship ==
The Major League championship of 2006-7 had the following eleven teams competing:

- Abejas of Universidad de Guanajuato (Guanajuato)
- Celaya Rugby Club (Celaya)
- Chihuahua Rugby (Chihuahua)
- Cumiyais Rugby Club (Monterrey)
- Demonios Rugby Club (Distrito Federal)
- Dragones Rugby Club (Guanajuato)
- Fox Rugby Club (Distrito Federal)
- Miquiztli Rugby Club (Distrito Federal)
- Aztecas Rugby Club (Puebla)
- Tazmania Rugby Club (Distrito Federal)
- Wallabies Rugby Club (Distrito Federal))
- Hammerheads (Cancún)
- Gansos Salvajes Tomás Moro (Distrito Federal)
- Guadalajara Rugby Club (Diablos)
- Toros Jefferson Rugby Club (Morelia) founded in 2009

Between 2011 and 2012 a new team was formed by young players, called:

- Koalas Rugby Team (Distrito federal)

After their first year they won the ascension match, getting themselves the entrance to the Major League.

== See also ==
- Mexican Rugby Federation
- Mexico national rugby union team
- Mexico national rugby sevens team — the Mexican sevens team occasionally competes in IRB World Sevens Series tournaments.
