= 2023 RAN Women's Rugby Championship =

Rugby union competition for women's national teams

2023 RAN Women's Championship
Tournament details
- Host: Jamaica
- Venue: University of the West Indies
- Date: 12–16 July
- Teams: 5

Final positions
- Champions: United States
- Runner-up: Trinidad and Tobago

Tournament statistics
- Matches played: 12

The 2023 RAN Women's Rugby Championship saw the return of women's fifteen-a-side rugby to the region. The tournament was held from July 12 to 16 in Kingston, Jamaica, at the University of the West Indies. Five teams competed in a round-robin tournament of 20-minute halves.

USA South defeated Trinidad and Tobago in the final to win the tournament.

== Table ==
Pos	Team	P	W	D	L	PF	PA	PD	BP	Pts
1	USA South	4	3	0	1	104	13	91	0	0
2	Trinidad and Tobago	4	3	0	1	41	43	–2	0	0
3	Mexico	4	2	0	2	56	24	32	0	0
4	Cayman Islands	4	1	0	3	25	105	–80	0	0
5	Jamaica	4	1	0	3	27	68	–41	0	0
First Two classify for the final. Next Two classify for the bronze final.

== Fixtures ==
=== Day 1 ===
12 July 2023	Jamaica	12–10	Mexico	Mona Bowl, Kingston
11:00 EST (UTC-5)

=== Day 2 ===
13 July 2023	Trinidad and Tobago	6–5	USA South	Mona Bowl, Kingston
10:00 EST (UTC-5)

13 July 2023	Cayman Islands	0–20	Mexico	Mona Bowl, Kingston
11:00 EST (UTC-5)

13 July 2023	Jamaica	7–8	Trinidad and Tobago	Mona Bowl, Kingston
14:00 EST (UTC-5)

13 July 2023	USA South	50–0	Cayman Islands	Mona Bowl, Kingston
15:00 EST (UTC-5)

=== Day 3 ===
14 July 2023	USA South	37–0	Jamaica	Mona Bowl, Kingston
10:00 EST (UTC-5)

14 July 2023	Trinidad and Tobago	27–12	Cayman Islands	Mona Bowl, Kingston
11:00 EST (UTC-5)

14 July 2023	Mexico	7–12	USA South	Mona Bowl, Kingston
13:00 EST (UTC-5)

14 July 2023	Cayman Islands	13–8	Jamaica	Mona Bowl, Kingston
14:00 EST (UTC-5)

14 July 2023	Mexico	19–0	Trinidad and Tobago	Mona Bowl, Kingston
16:00 EST (UTC-5)

== Finals ==
=== Bronze Final ===
16 July 2023	Mexico	15–11	Cayman Islands	Mona Bowl, Kingston
11:00 EST (UTC-5)

=== Final ===
16 July 2023	USA South	30–0	Trinidad and Tobago	Mona Bowl, Kingston
13:00 EST (UTC-5)

== Media coverage ==
Matches can be watched in the Caribbean live on SportsMax 2, SportsMax YouTube, and on the SportsMax App. Matches can also be watched on RAN’s website at www.rugbyamericasnorth.com.
