= Caribbean Select women's rugby union team =

Caribbean Select XV
- Union: Rugby Americas North

The Caribbean Select rugby union team are an inter-island sporting side with players coming from Trinidad & Tobago (T&T), Guyana, Jamaica, Barbados, and St Vincent and the Grenadines, representing them at rugby union. The side first played in 2010.

== History ==
The team was created in 2008 to give the US and Canadian U20 sides, competing in that year's NACRA tournament, extra games after the cost of travelling to Bahamas prevented most islands from sending their own teams. Players in 2008 came from Bermuda, Mexico, Jamaica, British Virgin Islands, Saint Vincent & the Grenadines, Barbados, and Guyana.

== Results summary ==
(Full internationals only)

Rugby: Caribbean XV internationals 2010-
Opponent	First game	Played	Won	Drawn	Lost	Percentage
Bahamas	2010	1	1	0	0	100.00%
Cayman Islands	2011	1	0	0	1	0.00%
Jamaica	2011	1	0	0	1	0.00%
Trinidad and Tobago	2011	1	0	0	1	0.00%
Summary		4	1	0	3	25.00%

== Results ==
=== Full internationals ===
2008-08-19

Bahamas	0-65	(Caribbean Community) Caribbean Select XV

Nassau, Bahamas

2011-07-10 (CARIB)

Caribbean Select XV (Caribbean Community)	0-92	Trinidad and Tobago

Grand Cayman, Cayman Islands

2011-07-12 (CARIB)

Cayman Islands	27-12	(Caribbean Community) Caribbean Select XV

Grand Cayman, Cayman Islands

2011-07-14 (CARIB)

Caribbean Select XV (Caribbean Community)	13-44	Jamaica

Grand Cayman, Cayman Islands

=== Other matches ===
2008-08-15

Caribbean Select XV (Caribbean Community)	0-43	Canada U20

Nassau, Bahamas

2008-08-17

Caribbean Select XV (Caribbean Community)	7-30	United States U20

Nassau, Bahamas

== See also ==
- Article by BVI's Cassandra Molver, who played in the team in 2010
