= Trinidad and Tobago Rugby Football Union =

- Sport: Rugby union
- Founded: 1928; 97 years ago
- World Rugby affiliation: 1992
- President: Maria Thomas
- Website: TTRFU

The Trinidad and Tobago Rugby Football Union (TTRFU) is the governing body for rugby union in Trinidad and Tobago. It was founded in 1928 and became affiliated to the International Rugby Board in 1992. It is also a member of the West Indies Rugby Union, the Trinidad & Tobago Olympic Committee and the North American and West Indian Rugby Association.

In May 2021, Maria Thomas was elected as the first female president of the TTRFU, defeating the incumbent Colin Peters.

== See also ==
- Trinidad and Tobago national rugby union team
- Rugby union in Trinidad and Tobago
- Trinidad and Tobago national rugby union team (sevens)
- Trinidad and Tobago women's national rugby union team
