= 2003 NAWIRA Women's Rugby Championship =

Tournament details
- Host: Trinidad and Tobago
- Venue: Port of Spain
- Date: 3 & 4 December 2003
- Countries: Jamaica; Trinidad and Tobago

Final positions
- Champions: Trinidad and Tobago

The 2003 NAWIRA Women's Rugby Championship was the inaugural edition of the tournament in the region. The event was hosted by Trinidad and Tobago in Port of Spain, on the 3rd and 4th of December. The competition only featured hosts, Trinidad and Tobago, and Jamaica.

Hosts, Trinidad and Tobago, won the tournament after keeping Jamaica scoreless in both Tests.

== Standings ==
Pos	Team	Pld	W	D	L	PF	PA	PD	Pts
1	Trinidad and Tobago	2	2	0	0	30	0	+30	4
2	Jamaica	2	0	0	2	0	30	−30	0

== Matches ==
2003-12-03

Trinidad and Tobago	20–0	Jamaica

Port of Spain

2003-12-04

Trinidad and Tobago	10–0	Jamaica

Port of Spain
