= Saint Vincent and the Grenadines women's national rugby union team =

Saint Vincent and the Grenadines
- Union: St. Vincent and the Grenadines Rugby Union
- Home stadium: Garrison Savannah Racetrack
First colours

World Rugby ranking
- Current: 69 (as of 2 March 2026)
- Highest: 65
- Lowest: 69 (2026)

First international
- Saint Vincent 0–90 Trinidad and Tobago (Bridgetown; 21 June 2009)

Biggest defeat
- Saint Vincent 0–90 Trinidad and Tobago (Bridgetown; 21 June 2009)

The Saint Vincent and the Grenadines women's national rugby union team are a national sporting side of Saint Vincent and the Grenadines, representing them at rugby union. The side first played in 2009.

== Results summary ==
(Full internationals only, updated to 27 June 2009)

Saint Vincent and the Grenadines Internationals From 2009
Opponent	First Match	Played	Won	Drawn	Lost	Win %
Barbados	2009	1	0	0	1	0.00%
Cayman Islands	2009	1	0	0	1	0.00%
Trinidad and Tobago	2009	1	0	0	1	0.00%
Summary	2009	3	0	0	3	0.00%

== Results ==
=== Full internationals ===
Won	Lost	Draw

Test	Date	Opponent	PF	PA	Venue	Event	Ref
1	2009-06-21	Trinidad and Tobago	0	90	Bridgetown	2009 NAWIRA Championship	
2	2009-06-24	Cayman Islands	0	76	Bridgetown	2009 NAWIRA Championship	
3	2009-06-27	Barbados	0	49	Bridgetown	2009 NAWIRA Championship	

== See also ==
- Rugby union in Saint Vincent and the Grenadines
