= Bahamas women's national rugby union team =

Bahamas
- Union: Bahamas Rugby Union
- Home stadium: Winton Rugby Centre

World Rugby ranking
- Current: 70 (as of 2 March 2026)
- Highest: 64
- Lowest: 70 (2026)

First international
- Bahamas 0–65 (Caribbean Community) Caribbean XV (Nassau; 19 August 2010)

Biggest defeat
- Bahamas 0–65 (Caribbean Community) Caribbean XV (Nassau; 19 August 2010)

The Bahamas women's national rugby union team are a national sporting side of the Bahamas, representing them at rugby union. The side played their first test against a Caribbean Select XV in 2010.

== Background ==
Bahamas hosted the 2010 NACRA Women's Championship in Nassau and played their first test match against a Caribbean Select XV's team on August 19. Their second test was against the Cayman Islands for the Caribbean Championship which they lost with a score of 48–0.

The Bahamas have only played two tests to date and are currently ranked 68th.

== Results summary ==
(Full internationals only, updated to 21 August 2010)

Bahamas Internationals From 2010
Opponent	First Match	Played	Won	Drawn	Lost	Win %
(Caribbean Community) Caribbean Select XV	2010	1	0	0	1	0.00%
Cayman Islands	2010	1	0	0	1	0.00%
Summary	2010	2	0	0	2	0.00%

== Results ==
=== Full internationals ===
Won	Lost	Draw

Test	Date	Opponent	PF	PA	Venue	Event	Ref
1	2010-08-19	(Caribbean Community) Caribbean Select XV	0	65	Nassau	Test	
2	2010-08-21	Cayman Islands	0	48	Nassau	2010 NACRA Caribbean Championship	

== See also ==
- Rugby union in the Bahamas
