= Barbados women's national rugby union team =

Sports team

Barbados
- Union: Barbados Rugby Football Union
First colours

World Rugby ranking
- Current: 68 (as of 2 March 2026)
- Highest: 59
- Lowest: 68 (2026)

First international
- Barbados 3–54 Cayman Islands (Bridgetown; 21 June 2009)

Biggest win
- Barbados 49–0 Saint Vincent and the Grenadines (Bridgetown; 27 June 2009)

Biggest defeat
- Barbados 0–78 Trinidad and Tobago (Bridgetown; 24 June 2009)

The Barbados women's national rugby union team are a national sporting side of Barbados, representing them at rugby union. The side first played in 2009.

== History ==
Barbados hosted the 2009 NAWIRA Women's Rugby Championship. They played their first test match against the Cayman Islands on 21 June 2009, they lost 3–54. Their only win to date was the 49–0 victory against Saint Vincent and the Grenadines at the same tournament.

== Results summary ==
(Full internationals only, updated to 28 April 2023)

Barbados Internationals From 2009
Opponent	First Match	Played	Won	Drawn	Lost	Win %
Cayman Islands	2009	1	0	0	1	0.00%
Saint Vincent	2009	1	1	0	0	100.00%
Trinidad and Tobago	2009	1	0	0	1	0.00%
Summary	2009	3	1	0	2	33.33%

== Results ==
=== Full internationals ===
Won	Lost	Draw

Test	Date	Opponent	PF	PA	Venue	Event	Ref
1	2009-06-21	Cayman Islands	3	54	Bridgetown	2009 NAWIRA Caribbean Championship	
2	2009-06-24	Trinidad and Tobago	0	78	Bridgetown	2009 NAWIRA Caribbean Championship	
3	2009-06-27	Saint Vincent	49	0	Bridgetown	2009 NAWIRA Caribbean Championship	

== See also ==
- Rugby union in Barbados
