= Guyana women's national rugby union team =

Guyana
- Union: Guyana Rugby Football Union

World Rugby ranking
- Current: 52 (as of 2 March 2026)
- Highest: 38 (2023)
- Lowest: 52 (2026)

First international
- Jamaica 5–6 Guyana; 28 September 2006 (CARIB)

Biggest win
- Guyana 41–0 Cayman Islands; 5 May 2008 (CARIB)

Biggest defeat
- Guyana 8–15 Trinidad and Tobago; 29 September 2006 (CARIB)

The Guyana women's national rugby union team represents Guyana in the sport of rugby union.

== History ==
The team were three-time NACRA 7s champions in consecutive years from 2008, but dwindled due to lack of funding. The 2016 Summer Olympics renewed interest in building the team.

== Results summary ==
(Full internationals only)

Rugby: Guyana internationals 2006-
| Opponent | First game | Played | Won | Drawn | Lost | Percentage |
|---|---|---|---|---|---|---|
| Cayman Islands | 2008 | 1 | 1 | 0 | 0 | 100.00% |
| Jamaica | 2006 | 2 | 2 | 0 | 0 | 100.00% |
| Trinidad and Tobago | 2006 | 2 | 0 | 1 | 1 | 25.00% |
| Summary | 2006 | 5 | 3 | 1 | 1 | 70.00% |

== Results ==
| Won | Lost | Draw |

=== Full internationals ===
| Test | Date | Opponent | F | A | Venue | Tournament |
|---|---|---|---|---|---|---|
| 1 | 2006-09-28 | Jamaica | 6 | 5 | Kingston, Jamaica | 2006 NAWIRA Championship |
| 2 | 2006-09-29 | Trinidad and Tobago | 8 | 15 | Kingston, Jamaica | 2006 NAWIRA Championship |
| 3 | 2008-05-05 | Cayman Islands | 41 | 0 | Georgetown, Guyana | 2008 NAWIRA Championship |
| 4 | 2008-05-07 | Trinidad and Tobago | 5 | 5 | Georgetown, Guyana | 2008 NAWIRA Championship |
| 5 | 2008-05-10 | Jamaica | 13 | 10 | Georgetown, Guyana | 2008 NAWIRA Championship |

== See also ==
- Rugby union in Guyana
- Guyana women's national football team
