= Mexico women's national rugby union team =

Mexico
- Union: Mexican Rugby Federation
- Head coach: Daniel Jaime
First colours	Second colours

World Rugby ranking
- Current: 34 (as of 23 March 2026)
- Highest: 26 (2025)
- Lowest: 34 (2025, 2026)

First international
- Mexico 27–0 Trinidad & Tobago (14 July 2024, RAN)

Biggest win
- Mexico 27–0 Trinidad & Tobago (14 July 2024, RAN)

Biggest defeat
- Mexico 5–65 Colombia (8 November 2025)

The Mexico women's national rugby union team are a national sporting side that represents Mexico in Women's rugby union. They played their first international test against Trinidad and Tobago in 2024.

== History ==
Mexico competed at the 2023 RAN Women's Rugby Championship that was held in Kingston, Jamaica. They played their first match against Jamaica on 12 July. They lost their opening match, but went on to record wins against the Cayman Islands, twice, and Trinidad and Tobago.

=== First test ===
Mexico played their first-ever international test match on 14 July 2024 against Trinidad and Tobago at the 2024 RAN Women's Rugby Championship. The match took place at FC Total, Querétaro in Mexico and was played for World Rugby Ranking points.

== Results summary ==
(Full internationals only)

Rugby: Mexico internationals 2024-
Opponent	First game	Played	Won	Drawn	Lost	Percentage
Chile	2026	1	0	0	1	0%
Colombia	2025	1	0	0	1	0%
Jamaica	2024	2	2	0	0	100%
Trinidad and Tobago	2024	2	1	0	1	50%
Summary	2024	6	3	0	3	50%

== Results ==
=== Full internationals ===
Won	Lost	Draw

Test	Date	Opponent	PF	PA	Venue	Event	Ref
1	2024-07-14	Trinidad and Tobago	27	0	FC Total, Querétaro	2024 RAN Championship	
2	2024-12-07	Jamaica	46	19	Estadio Alfredo Harp Helú, Mexico City	Test	
3	2025-05-24	Jamaica	39	19	Bramwell Clarke Sports Complex, Ewarton	Test	
4	2025-06-28	Trinidad and Tobago	16	18	Larry Gomes Stadium, Malabar, Arima	Test	
5	2025-11-08	Colombia	5	65	Estadio Cincuentenario, Medellin	Test	
6	2026-10-18	Chile	10	39	Centro de Alto Rendimiento del Rugby, La Reina	Test	

=== Non-international matches ===
Date	Mexico	PF	PA	Opponent	Venue	Tournament
2023-07-12	Mexico XV	10	12	Jamaica	Mona Bowl, Kingston	2023 RAN Championship
2023-07-13	Mexico XV	20	0	Cayman Islands	Mona Bowl, Kingston	2023 RAN Championship
2023-07-14	Mexico XV	7	12	USA South	Mona Bowl, Kingston	2023 RAN Championship
2023-07-14	Mexico XV	19	0	Trinidad and Tobago	Mona Bowl, Kingston	2023 RAN Championship
2023-07-16	Mexico XV	15	11	Cayman Islands	Mona Bowl, Kingston	2023 RAN Championship

== See also ==
- Rugby union in Mexico
- Mexican Rugby Federation
