= Cayman Islands women's national rugby union team =

Cayman Islands
- Union: Cayman Rugby Union
- Home stadium: South Sound Rugby Pitch

World Rugby ranking
- Current: 62 (as of 2 March 2026)
- Highest: 58
- Lowest: 62 (2026)

First international
- Cayman Is. 3–15 Jamaica (2004)

Biggest defeat
- Cayman Is. 0–79 Trinidad & Tobago (2008)

The Cayman Islands women's national rugby union team are a national sporting side of Cayman Islands, representing them at rugby union. The side played their first fifteen-a-side test match against Jamaica in 2004.

== History ==
In the late 1990s women's touch rugby was flourishing in the Cayman Islands under the guidance of Chris “Jacko” Jackson. A small core of all round sports women (Tracy Iler, Mitch Taylor, Lisa Kehoe) and contact rugby veterans (Karen Jessop and Jessica Lane) were keen to take the next step into forming a women's contact rugby team. With the employment of Richard Adams as the CRFU's first Director of Rugby in 2000 momentum began to grow until ex-rugby league professional, Steve “Smudger” Smith, was enlisted as the first women's contact rugby coach. The initial training sessions saw about 14 women attending but as the reality of black eyes and bruises set in, the numbers quickly depleted. Then came an opportunity to train for a seven's game against the national Jamaican women's sevens team as part of a men's sevens tournament being hosted in Kingston.

The Cayman girls (all expats) trained hard under Smudger's tutelage but arrived at the tournament as definite underdogs. The Jamaican team possessed speed and experience but on the day in question this proved no match for the Cayman team's discipline, structure and hard tackling and the sprinting prowess of Janie Fleming and Lorna Campbell. The Cayman team beat the Jamaican team decisively, twice in one day, which caused a major upset in the Jamaican camp. The inaugural Cayman squad returned home with a taste for victory and a strong desire to improve at sevens and develop into a full 15s squad.

With the small pool of players to draw on, the women's squad focused on sevens for the next 18 months, representing Cayman at the Trinidad Sevens and the Las Vegas Midnight Sevens. Gradually numbers swelled to enable games of 10s and eventually 15s enabling Cayman to host teams from Seacoast USA, Jamaica and Queens University with the first ever National 15s game taking place against Jamaica in 2003 under the captaincy of Caroline Deegan. In those early years the girls were indebted to the succession of coaches (Richard Adams, Adam Craven and Kevin Crooks) and inspired by the enthusiasm of the first Caymanian women rugby players such as Loletta Hanna and Nathalee Curtis. The exciting progress of the women's squad in those early years was unexpectedly halted when Hurricane Ivan decimated the Cayman Islands in September 2004. Many Caymanians and expatriates alike were forced to evacuate the island for several months and the rugby club itself required extensive rebuilding and renovation. A small core of players remained on island and committed to promoting rugby and rebuilding the women's program as soon as time and resources allowed.

The Cayman Islands competed at the 2023 RAN Women's Rugby Championship in Jamaica.

== Results summary ==
(Full internationals only)

Rugby: Cayman Islands internationals 2004-
Opponent	First game	Played	Won	Drawn	Lost	Win%
Bahamas	2010	1	1	0	0	100%
Barbados	2009	1	1	0	0	100%
(Caribbean Community) Caribbean Select XV	2011	1	1	0	0	100%
Guyana	2008	1	0	0	1	0.00%
Jamaica	2004	5	1	0	4	20%
Saint Vincent and the Grenadines	2008	1	1	0	0	100%
Trinidad and Tobago	2008	4	0	0	4	0.00%
Summary	2004	14	5	0	9	35.71%

== See also ==
- Rugby union in the Cayman Islands
