= Jamaica women's national rugby union team =

Jamaica
- Union: Jamaica Rugby Football Union
First colours	Second colours

World Rugby ranking
- Current: 39 (as of 23 March 2026)
- Highest: 37 (2024)
- Lowest: 41 (2026)

First international
- Trinidad and Tobago 20–0 Jamaica (2003 NAWIRA Championship)

Biggest win
- Jamaica 71–7 Trinidad and Tobago (Bramwell Clarke Sports Complex, Ewarton; 31 May 2025)

Biggest defeat
- Jamaica 5–37 Trinidad and Tobago (2011 NACRA Championship)

The Jamaica women's national rugby union team are a national sporting side of Jamaica, representing them at rugby union. They played their first sevens international in 2000, and their first test in 2003.

== History ==
Jamaica played their first international against Trinidad and Tobago on 3 December 2003 in Port of Spain. It was the inaugural NAWIRA Women's Rugby Championship that was hosted in Trinidad and Tobago's capital; the hosts were victorious in both games as they kept Jamaica scoreless both times.

In 2006, Jamaica hosted Guyana and Trinidad and Tobago in September. Despite a narrow loss to Guyana in the opening match, Jamaica managed an impressive win against Trinidad and Tobago to win their first tournament due to their higher goal difference.

They were runners-up in 2011, and between 2016 and 2019 they competed in a ten-a-side version of the game as the region was trying to build-up the game. The competition was cancelled in 2020 and 2021 due to the ongoing COVID-19 pandemic.

2022 saw Jamaica compete in the regions first 12-a-side tournament. They met the USA South Panthers in the final after an undefeated run in their pool games, and just lost by a three-point margin.

In 2023, Jamaica attended their first fifteens tournament after twelve years.

== Results summary ==
(Full internationals only)

Rugby: Jamaica internationals 2003-
Opponent	First game	Played	Won	Drawn	Lost	Percentage
(Caribbean Community) Caribbean Select XV	2011	1	1	0	0	100%
Cayman Islands	2004	5	4	0	1	80%
Guyana	2006	2	0	0	2	0.00%
Mexico	2024	2	0	0	2	0.00%
Trinidad and Tobago	2003	6	1	0	5	16.66%
Summary		16	6	0	10	37.5%

== See also ==
- Rugby union in Jamaica
