= Trinidad and Tobago women's national rugby union team =

Trinidad and Tobago
- Union: Trinidad & Tobago Rugby Football Union
First colours

World Rugby ranking
- Current: 32 (as of 23 March 2026)
- Highest: 24 (2023)
- Lowest: 32 (2026)

First international
- TTO 20–0 Jamaica (Port of Spain; 03 December 2003)

Biggest win
- TTO 92–0 Caribbean XV (Caribbean Community) (Truman Bodden Sports Complex, George Town; 10 July 2011)

Biggest defeat
- Colombia 96–0 TTO (Medellín; 15 June 2024)

The Trinidad and Tobago women's national rugby union team is a national sporting side that represents Trinidad and Tobago in Women's rugby union. They played their first test match in 2003 and compete annually in the Rugby Americas North Women's Rugby Championship.

== History ==
Trinidad and Tobago competed in the inaugural NAWIRA Women's Rugby Championship in 2003, they hosted Jamaica in Port of Spain in a two-test series and were victorious in both games.

Between 2016 and 2019 they competed in a ten-a-side version of the game as they tried to build-up the game in the region. The competition was cancelled in 2020 and 2021 due to the ongoing COVID-19 pandemic.

2022 saw the teams increase up to twelve players and the region had its first 12-a-side tournament.

In 2023, Trinidad and Tobago sent their fifteens team after almost twelve years. They finished as runners-up after losing to USA South in the final.

Colombia gave Trinidad and Tobago their biggest defeat when they met at Estadio Cincuentenario in Medellín, Colombia on 15 June 2024. Colombia ran in 15 unanswered tries to end the game 96–0.

== Results summary ==
(Full internationals only, updated to 14 July 2023)

Trinidad and Tobago Internationals From 2003
Opponent	First Match	Played	Won	Drawn	Lost	For	Against	Win %
Barbados	2009	1	1	0	0	78	0	100.00%
(Caribbean Community) Caribbean Select XV	2011	1	1	0	0	92	0	100.00%
Cayman Islands	2008	4	4	0	0	204	12	100.00%
Colombia	2024	1	0	0	1	0	19	0.00%
Guyana	2006	2	1	1	0	20	13	50.00%
Jamaica	2003	6	5	0	1	87	49	83.33%
Mexico	2024	1	0	0	1	0	27	0.00%
Saint Vincent	2009	1	1	0	0	90	0	100.00%
Summary	2003	17	13	1	3	571	101	76.47%

== See also ==
- Trinidad and Tobago national rugby union team
- Rugby union in Trinidad and Tobago
- Trinidad and Tobago Rugby Football Union
- Trinidad and Tobago national rugby sevens team
