= Ensanche =

Development areas in Spanish cities at the end of the 19th century

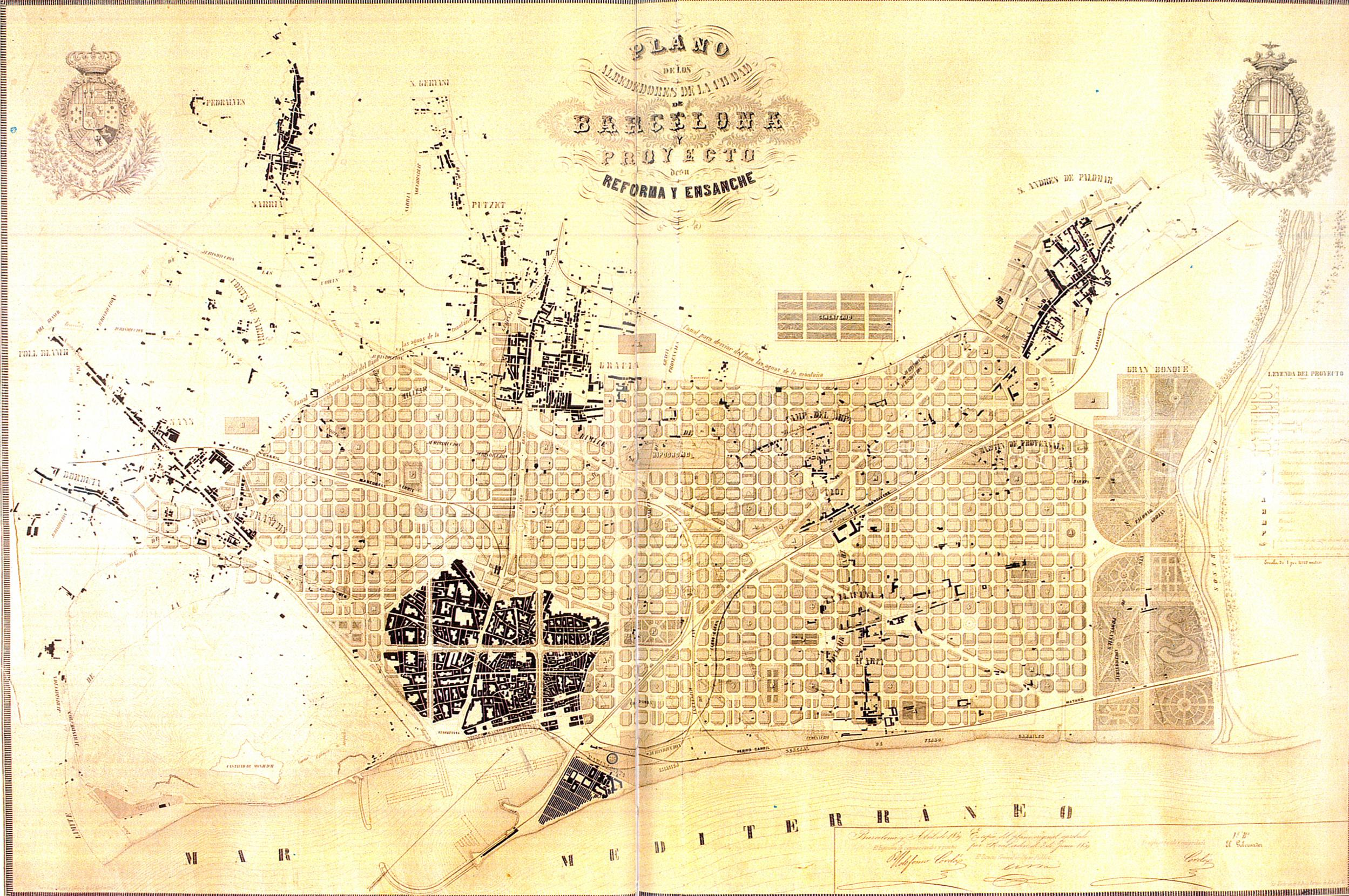
The development project for Barcelona, 1859.

Ensanche means "widening" in Spanish. It is used to name the development areas of Spanish cities around the end of the 19th century, when the demographic explosion and the Industrial Revolution prompted the tearing down of the old city wall and the construction of neighborhoods under grid plans. It is also found across much of Hispanic America for expansion of the cities beyond the traditional city walls.

== Background ==
The programme of city extensions in Spain began simultaneously in 1860 with the plans for Barcelona by Ildefons Cerdà and Madrid by Carlos María de Castro, influenced by Haussmann's transformation of Paris from 1852 (and, in turn, have been said to have influenced Haussmann's later projects). Those ensanches extended cities beyond their traditional limits by demolishing city walls, transforming riverbanks and subdividing the extramuros – rural land outside the city walls. Ensanches were generally based on principles articulated by Cerdà. These included reserving significant open space by requiring mid-block open space and whole block parks. The height of buildings was set by reference to the width of the adjacent street. Many of these requirements were modified, and the building volumes increased, by later amendments beginning in 1864 (Madrid).

It is specifically used for:

- The Eixample (Catalan for ensanche) of Barcelona, planned by Cerdà
- The Eixample of the city of Valencia.
- The Eixample in Palma, Mallorca.
- The Ensanche Este of Madrid under the Plan Castro by Carlos María de Castro enacted by Royal Decree in 1860.
- The Ensanche de Bilbao after the annexation of the former village of Abando.

== Usage in Hispanic America ==
The term is widely use for the planned expansion of some cities across Hispanic America. Among them is the city of Santo Domingo, Dominican Republic which used the term extensively as a prefix for expansion neighborhoods beyond its traditional old city.

- Ensanche La Fe
- Ensanche Piantini
- Ensanche Luperon
- Ensanche Capotillo
- Ensanche Naco
- Ensanche Espaillat
- Ensanche Quisqueya
- Ensanche Simon Bolivar
- Ensanche Paraiso
