= Ensanche La Fe =

Ensanche La Fe La Fe
- Location within the Dominican Republic
- Coordinates: 18°29′29″N 69°55′18″W
- Country: Dominican Republic
- Province: Distrito Nacional

Government
  - Mayor: Carolina Mejía (PRM)
  - Council members: List: Argelys Jiménez Bierd (PRM); Dewar Crousett Rojas (PRM); Edgar E. Javier Monte De Oca (PRM); Felix Mateo Lugo (PRM); Felix Perdomo Figueroa (PRM); Shade Medina Genao (PRM); Jairo Doñe De La Cruz (FP); Manuel H. García Del Rosario (FP); Domingo Antonio Corniel Sosa (PLD)
  - Senator: Omar Fernández (FP)
  - Deputies: List: Alfredo Pacheco Osoria (PRM); Manuel de Jesús Núñez Guerrero (PRM); Maribel Altagracia Almánzar de Ogando (PRM); Rafael Anibal Diaz Rodriguez (PRM); Rafael Tobías Crespo Pérez (FP); Ramón Antonio Bueno Patiño (PRM)

Population (2022)
  - Total: 16,924
- Demonym: Spanish: Capitaleño (fem. Capitaleña)
- Time zone: UTC−04:00 (AST)
- Postal code: 10514
- Website: adn.gob.do (in Spanish)

Ensanche La Fe is a Sector in the city of Santo Domingo in Distrito Nacional of the Dominican Republic. This neighborhood is populated in particular by individuals from the middle class. Formerly known as "Los Potreros de Venturita". Its name originates from Inmobiliaria La Fe the real estate company that once owned the land which, in turn, took its name from the former La Fe sugar mill that operated in that same area a few decades earlier.

It is one of the most important sectors in Distrito Nacional. It is bounded by Avenida Pedro Livio Cedeño and the sector of Cristo Rey to the north; north and west, La Agustina; Avenida San Martín and Ensanche Kennedy to the south; Avenida Lope de Vega and the sector of Viejo Arroyo Hondo to the west; and Avenida Máximo Gómez and the sector of Villa Juana to the east.

== History ==
It was founded in 1942 by order of the dictator Rafael Trujillo for the purpose of constructing an aqueduct and the former Perla Antillana racetrack. It was inaugurated in 1941 on the site where Hospital General de la Plaza de la Salud is located today. In addition to this complex, which comprises five hospital centers, the area also houses the Hospital Salvador B. Gautier, Estadio Quisqueya Juan Marichal, the television station Color Visión, and Coliseo de Boxeo Carlos "Teo" Cruz.

== Hospitals and medical centers ==
Hospital General de la Plaza de la Salud (2026)

- Hospital General de la Plaza de la Salud (HGPS)
- Centro de Diagnóstico Medicina Avanzada y Telemedicina (CEDIMAT)
- Centro Médico Alcántara & González
- Hospital Salvador B. Gautier
- Hospital Materno Infantil Santo Socorro, now Hospital Infantil Dr. José Manuel Rodríguez Jimenes
- Clínica Residencial Virgen de la Guía (Sociedad Benéfica Española)
- Centro de Diálisis y Nefrología (CEDNEFRO)

== Schools ==
- Escuela Fidel Ferrer: Founded in 1963 and located between Calle Américo Lugo, Calle Arturo Logroño, Calle Ramón Cáceres and Calle Juan Alejandro Ibarra.
- Liceo Comercial Víctor Estrella Liz, now known as Politécnico Lic. Víctor Estrella Liz or "La Perito". It was relocated in 1972 to the corner of Avenida Héctor Homero Hernández Vargas (Avenida San Cristóbal), esquina Calle Pepillo Salcedo.
- Escuela Nacional de Artes y Oficios (ENAO): Founded by the dictator Rafael Trujillo in 1952 and inaugurated by Joaquín Balaguer. Located at the intersection of Avenida Héctor Homero Hernández Vargas (Avenida San Cristóbal) and Avenida Lope de Vega.
- Escuela Nacional de Artesanía (CENADARTE): Founded in 1950 by Rafael Trujillo, it is located on Avenida Héctor Homero Hernández Vargas (Avenida San Cristóbal), near Calle Luis E. Pérez García.
- Centro Educativo Nuestra Señora de la Fe (CENSFE): Founded during the final term of Joaquín Balaguer’s presidency. It is located on Calle Bethoven Escoto (Calle 51), esquina Calle Luis Amiama Tió.
- Escuela María Fania Encarnación González.
- Centro Educativo Marillac: Founded on September 12, 1952.

== Educational schools ==
Centro Educativo
Nombre	Ubicación	Fundado
Colegio Evangélico Dominicano.	Calle Juan Alejandro Ibarra, frente a la escuela Fidel Ferrer.	Fundado en 1950.
Centro Educativo San Benito Abad.	Calle Mauricio Báez #229, entre 14 de junio y Ramón Cáceres.	Fundado en 1980.
Colegio Nuestra Señora de la Altagracia.	Calle Ramón Cáceres #133, próxima al Juzgado de Paz.	Fundada aproximadamente en 1960 por Francisco Antonio Cerda Santos (Don Fran o Profesor Fran). Leonel Fernández fue docente en este colegio.
Academia La Trinitaria.	Calle Francisco Villaespesa, entre 14 de junio y Juan José Duarte	Fundada en 1964por el matemático y educador Francisco Antonio Cerda Santos (Don Fran o Profesor Fran), uno de los fundadores del Ensanche La Fe; Bolívar Sierra y Jimmy Sierra (educadores).
Colegio Divino Maestro.	Calle Ramón Cáceres, entre Francisco Villaespesa y Mauricio Báez.	Fundado aproximadamente en 1970.

== Churches ==
- Parroquia Santa Teresa de Jesús: Founded in 1955, located on Calle Peña Batlle, between Avenida Máximo Gómez Avenue and Calle Juan José Duarte.
- Parroquia Nuestra Señora del Pilar.
- Salón del Reino de los Testigos de Jehová: Founded in 1970, located at Calle Arturo Logroño 133.
- Iglesia Evangélica La 33: Located on Calle Juan Alejandro Ibarra, between Calle Mauricio Báez and Calle Francisco Villaespesa.
- Parroquia Nuestra Señora de la Fe: Located on Calle Bethoven Escoto (Calle 51), esquina Calle Luis Amiama Tió.

== Neighborhood associations ==
- Junta de Vecinos Integral La Fe. Fundada en el 2009 y ubicada entre Tiradentes, San Martín, San Cristóbal y López de Vega.
- Junta de Vecinos La Fe Central.
- Junta de Vecinos Unidos. Ubicada entre Mauricio Baéz al sur, Lic. Arturo Logroño al norte, Ramón Cáceres al este y José Ortega y Gasset al oeste. Su presidente es el comunitario Leonardo Ventura.

== National and international companies ==
- Industrias Nigua S.A.
- Grupo Mejía & Arcalá.
- Colchones Postopédico La Reyna.
- Maprica.
- Café Indubán.
- Molinos Modernos.
- Galletas Dino.
- Pasta Milano.
- Galletas Guarina.
- Galletas Can Can.
- Galletas GAMA.
- Galletas Hatuey.
- Quesos Michell.
- Leche Milex.
- Grupo Viamar.
- Ayuntamiento de Distrito Nacional.
- Farmacía Llúberes.
- Juzgado de Paz.
- IDSS (Instituto Dominicano de Seguros Sociales).

== Sports centers ==
- Estadio Quisqueya Juan Marichal: Opened in 1955 and located between Avenida Héctor Homero Hernández Vargas (Avenida San Cristóbal), Avenida Tiradentes, and Calle Pepillo Salcedo.
- Coliseo de Boxeo Carlos "Teo" Cruz: Located at the corner of Avenida Héctor Homero Hernández Vargas (Avenida San Cristóbal), and Avenida Tiradentes.
- Club Deportivo y Cultural Ensanche La Fe: Founded in 1970, with the roof completed in 2012. Located between Calle 39 and Calle Arturo Logroño.
- Club Ministerio de Obras Públicas y Comunicaciones (MOPC): Located on Calle Horacio Blanco Fombona.

== Sports clubs and professional teams ==
- Tigres del Licey
- Leones del Escogido
- Club Deportivo y Cultural La Fe
- Club Juvenil La Fe
- Liga Antonio Peña
- Club Viajeros de La Fe
- Liga Orlando Martínez
- Liga Deportiva Mercedes
- Unión de Ligas del Ensanche La Fe
- Liga de Baloncesto Integral La Fe

== Media ==
- Color Visión: Located between Avenida San Martín and Calle Emilio A. Morel.
- Periódico El Nacional: Located at the corner of Avenida San Martín and Avenida Ortega y Gassett.
- Periódico El Día: Located at the corner of Avenida San Martín and Avenida Ortega y Gassett.
- Periódico Hoy: Located at the corner of Avenida San Martín and Avenida Ortega y Gassett.

== State offices ==
- Centro de Operaciones de Emergencias (COE)
- Oficina del Estado Civil de la Circunscripción
- Ministerio de Obras Públicas y Comunicaciones (MOPC)
- Ministerio de Salud Pública y Asistencia Social (MISPAS or MSP)
- Instituto de la Aguja

== Political parties ==
- Social Christian Reformist Party: Founded in 1972 by Joaquín Balaguer and located at the corner of Avenida Héctor Homero Hernández and Avenida Tiradentes.
