= La Agustina =

La Agustina La Agustinita
- Interactive map example of La Agustina in Distrito Nacional
- Location within the Dominican Republic
- Coordinates: 18°29′47″N 69°55′40″W
- Country: Dominican Republic
- Province: Distrito Nacional

Government
  - Mayor: Carolina Mejía (PRM)
  - Council members: List: Argelys Jiménez Bierd (PRM); Dewar Crousett Rojas (PRM); Edgar E. Javier Monte De Oca (PRM); Felix Mateo Lugo (PRM); Felix Perdomo Figueroa (PRM); Shade Medina Genao (PRM); Jairo Doñe De La Cruz (FP); Manuel H. García Del Rosario (FP); Domingo Antonio Corniel Sosa (PLD)
  - Senator: Omar Fernández (FP)
  - Deputies: List: Alfredo Pacheco Osoria (PRM); Manuel de Jesús Núñez Guerrero (PRM); Maribel Altagracia Almánzar de Ogando (PRM); Rafael Anibal Diaz Rodriguez (PRM); Rafael Tobías Crespo Pérez (FP); Ramón Antonio Bueno Patiño (PRM)

Population (2022)
  - Total: 18,136
- Demonym: Spanish: Capitaleño (fem. Capitaleña)
- Time zone: UTC−04:00 (AST)
- Postal code: 10516
- Website: adn.gob.do (in Spanish)

La Agustina is a sector or neighborhood in the city of Santo Domingo in Distrito Nacional of the Dominican Republic. Is populated in particular by individuals from the middle class. It is bordered by Cristo Rey to the north and east, Ensanche La Fe to the south, and Viejo Arroyo Hondo to the west.

== Schools ==
- Escuela Básica Francisco Ulises Domínguez.
- Escuela Básica Club Juventud en Desarrollo.
- Centro Educativo La Milagrosa.
- Colegio Escuelita Tía Ori.
- Colegio Nuevo Sol.
- Centro Educativo Cristo Rey.

== Hospitals and medical centers ==
- Caritas Arquidiócesis de Santo Domingo.
- Centro de Primer Nivel La Agustinita (CPNA).

== Churches ==
- Parroquia Cristo Rey.

== Sports centers ==
- Club La Agustina.
- Club Deportivo AJAPRO.
- Club Lanha Gautier.
- Campo de Fútbol Oratorio Centro Juvenil Cristo Rey (El Vivero).

== National and international companies ==
- COSANCA.
- Distribuidora Farmaceutica ABC.

== Neighborhood associations ==
- Junta de Vecinos La Agustina.
- Junta de Vecinos de La Agustinita.
