= Los Cacicazgos =

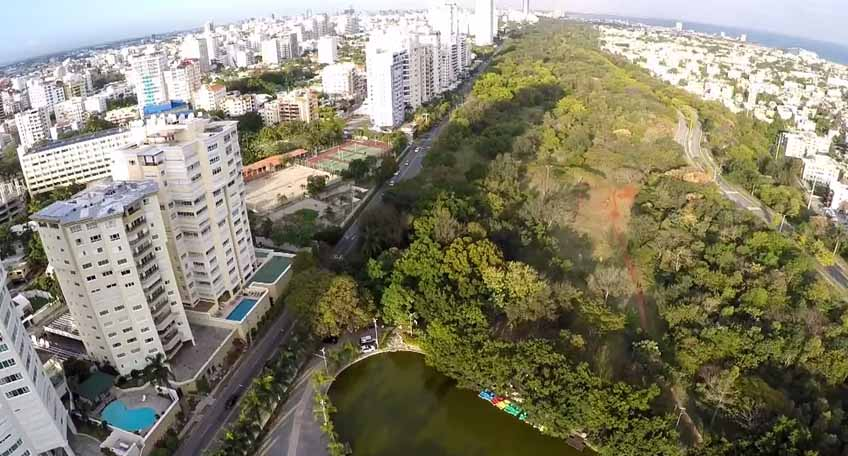
- Santo Domingo, Dominican Republic city, Mirador Sur

- Location within the Dominican Republic
- Coordinates: 18°30′N 69°59′W
- Country: Dominican Republic
- Province: Distrito Nacional

Government
  - Mayor: Carolina Mejía

Population (2008)
  - Total: 15,725
- Demonym: capitaleño/capitaleña
- Time zone: UTC-4 UTC
  - Summer (DST): UTCNone
- Website: adn.gob.do (in Spanish)

Los Cacicazgos (from Spanish 'The Caciquedoms') is a district or neighborhood in the city of Santo Domingo, the capital of the Dominican Republic. It is one of the richest neighborhoods in Dominican Republic and the wealthiest in the city of Santo Domingo. The district is named after the Native Taino Chiefdoms of Hispaniola. Los Cacicazgos is in particular populated by individuals from the upper class.

The district has the lowest poverty rate in the city surpassing the neighborhood of Piantini. It is the city's most opulent borough; the Anacaona Avenue has the most expensive price per m^{2} in the country. Its limits are: to the north, Renacimiento; to the east, Mirador Sur park; to the south, South Vantage Point Park and beyond it, Buenos Aires; to the west, Herrera (in the Province of Santo Domingo).

== Sources ==
- Distrito Nacional sectors
