= Distrito Nacional =

Subdivision of the Dominican Republic

- District
- Flag Coat of arms
- Motto: "Ciudad Primada de América" (in Spanish) ("First City of America")
- Location of the Distrito Nacional
- Interactive map of Distrito Nacional
- Country: Dominican Republic
- District since: 1932
- Capital: Santo Domingo

Government
  - Type: Subdivisions
  - Body: 1 municipalities 0 municipal districts
  - Mayor: Carolina Mejía (PRM)
  - Congresspersons: 1 Senator; 18 Deputies
  - Senator: Omar Fernández (FP)
  - Deputies: List: Alfredo Pacheco Osoria (PRM); Carlos Sánchez Quezada (PRM); Charles Noel Mariotti Paz (PLD); Chavely Melina Sánchez Taveras (PRM); Eliazer Matos Féliz (PRM); Fanny Selinés Méndez Simonó (FP); Francisca Trinidad Jaque Aponte (PRM); Gustavo Antonio Sánchez García (PLD); Jose Manuel Caraballo Gomez (PRM); Liz Adriana Mieses Díaz (PRM); Manuel de Jesús Núñez Guerrero (PRM); Maribel Altagracia Almánzar de Ogando (PRM); Rafael Anibal Diaz Rodriguez (PRM); Rafael Tobías Crespo Pérez (FP); Ramón Antonio Bueno Patiño (PRM); Sergio Moya de la Cruz (PRM); Vicente Arturo Sánchez Henríquez (PRM); Yuderka Yvelisse de la Rosa Guerrero (FP)

Area
  - Total: 104.44 km^{2} (40.32 sq mi)

Population (2022)
  - Total: 1,029,110
  - Density: 9,853.6/km^{2} (25,521/sq mi)
- Time zone: UTC−04:00 (AST)
- Area code: 1-809 1-829 1-849
- ISO 3166-2: DM-01
- Postal codes: 10100 to 10699
- Website: adn.gob.do (in Spanish)

Distrito Nacional (pronounced [disˈtɾito nasjoˈnal], locally [dihˈtɾito nasjoˈnal]; D.N.; lit. 'National District') is a subdivision of the Dominican Republic enclosing the capital Santo Domingo. It is not in any of the provinces, but in practice, it acts as a province on its own. Before October 16, 2001, the Distrito Nacional was much larger, including what is now known as Santo Domingo Province. Published statistics and maps generally show the former, larger, Distrito Nacional. The Distrito Nacional has no rural or underdeveloped areas.

== Points of interest ==
=== Poligono Central ===
Poligono Central is the central area of Santo Domingo. Upscale neighborhoods of Naco, Piantini, and Paraiso are located within this central polygon. Most of the financial activity in Santo Domingo is also located in the Poligono.

=== Central Government ===
Distrito Nacional houses the central government's executive branch Presidential Office (Palacio Nacional), the national congressional building (Congreso Nacional) and the top judicial court building (Suprema Corte de Justicia). It also houses all the nationwide public office's main buildings, called Ministerios (formerly Secretarías de Estado).

=== Ciudad Colonial ===
For the main article, please select Ciudad Colonial.

Ciudad Colonial (lit. "Colonial City") is the oldest continually occupied European settlement in the Western hemisphere, established by Bartholomew Columbus and the Spanish explorers in the New World. It has several historic landmarks and is declared as World Heritage Site by the UNESCO.

=== Nightlife ===
There are various nightlife activities available inside the Distrito Nacional. Upscale nightclubs, casinos, hotels, restaurants with international bars are widely available. Discothèque DJs and live performances caters both local sounds (merengue, salsa or bachata) and dance music (house, techno, trance, reggaeton, drum and bass, etc.) Most nightclubs alternate between the two main genres; some other clubs stick almost exclusively to either one. Several chain restaurants are available serving dinner up to midnight. Most restaurants within hotels don't close at all, and the majority of casinos serve complimentary snacks all night. Most restaurants are specialized on the following cuisines: Local, Italian, French, Steakhouse, Mexican, Spanish, Seafood, Chinese and Japanese. There are several movie cinemas that play movies in English (with subtitles) and are on par with worldwide premiers. Jazz music outlets, live theater, live concerts and sports events are available throughout the whole week.

=== Parks ===
Distrito Nacional has several urban parks, the largest one, Parque Mirador Sur, overlooking the Caribbean Sea from a high cliff from the Avenida Mirador Sur (also called Avenida de la Salud - Health Avenue). It has several miles of open road designed for picnic, jogging and cycling. Roller skating and even Kendo are regularly practiced in areas of the park.

Other places in the area include:

- Plaza de la Cultura Juan Pablo Duarte - which houses several national museums and is host of the International Book Fair. It houses the Teatro Nacional. The Orquesta Sinfónica Nacional holds concerts under the direction of Maestro José Antonio Molina.
- Centro Olímpico Juan Pablo Duarte - Olympic facility in the center of the city. It includes the Estadio Olímpico Félix Sánchez.
- Estadio Quisqueya - baseball stadium, home of two national teams: Tigres del Licey and Leones del Escogido. The former is the winningest team of the Caribbean Series.

=== Shopping ===
There are several shopping malls that represent international brands of clothing, electronic goods, gifts and the like. Banks, barber shops, internet cafés, travel agencies, dental offices and supermarkets can all be found under a single roof.

=== Schools ===
There are plenty of public (government funded) and private schools that offer teaching in both Spanish and English. Among the public universities is the first university of the Americas, Universidad Autónoma de Santo Domingo, located near the center-south of the city. The first private university, Pontificia Universidad Católica Madre y Maestra, has a campus nearby.

== Transportation ==
=== Metro de Santo Domingo ===
The Distrito Nacional boasts the first and only underground public transportation system in the country. The first line connects the Distrito Nacional with Santo Domingo Norte.

=== Public transportation ===
Other means of public transportation include: taxi services, public bus routes, urban transportation by bus, local airports and rent cars. International flights are handled by the nearby Las Américas International Airport and La Isabela airport. It can be reached from the city center through some 20 miles of recently expanded expressway and new suspension bridge (Puente Presidente Juan Bosch).

== Politics ==
The Distrito Nacional is represented in the Senate and the Chamber of Deputies on the same scale as a Province (a single Senator (Senador), plus one Deputy (Diputado) per 50,000 inhabitants). Its local government is the same as the provincial municipios, without the equivalent of a provincial tier of government.

Sectors of the District

== Sectores (neighborhoods) ==
The Distrito Nacional is subdivided in incorporated areas (neighborhoods) called sectores which could be considered as small urban towns. All sectores are serviced directly by the municipal mayor's office (Alcalde).

Some sectores prefixes:

- Ciudad (city) – applies to the original older parts of town, some dating back to colonial times of Dominican Republic.
- Ensanche (lit. "widening") – usually, but not always, applied to the more "modern" parts of the city.
- Villa – the urban outskirts of both the old city of Santo Domingo and the current (smaller) Distrito Nacional.

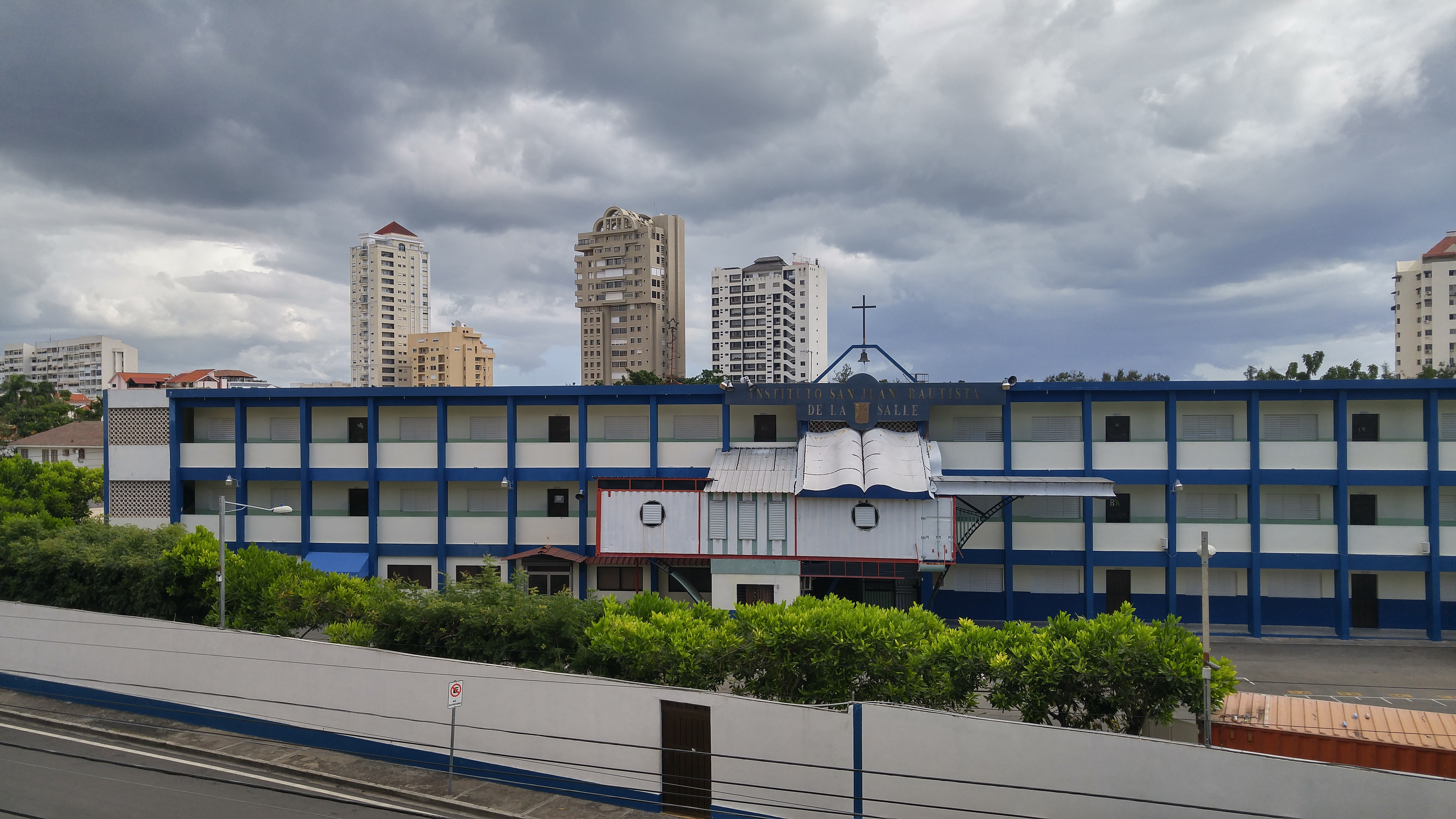
Bella Vista, Dominican Republic skyline

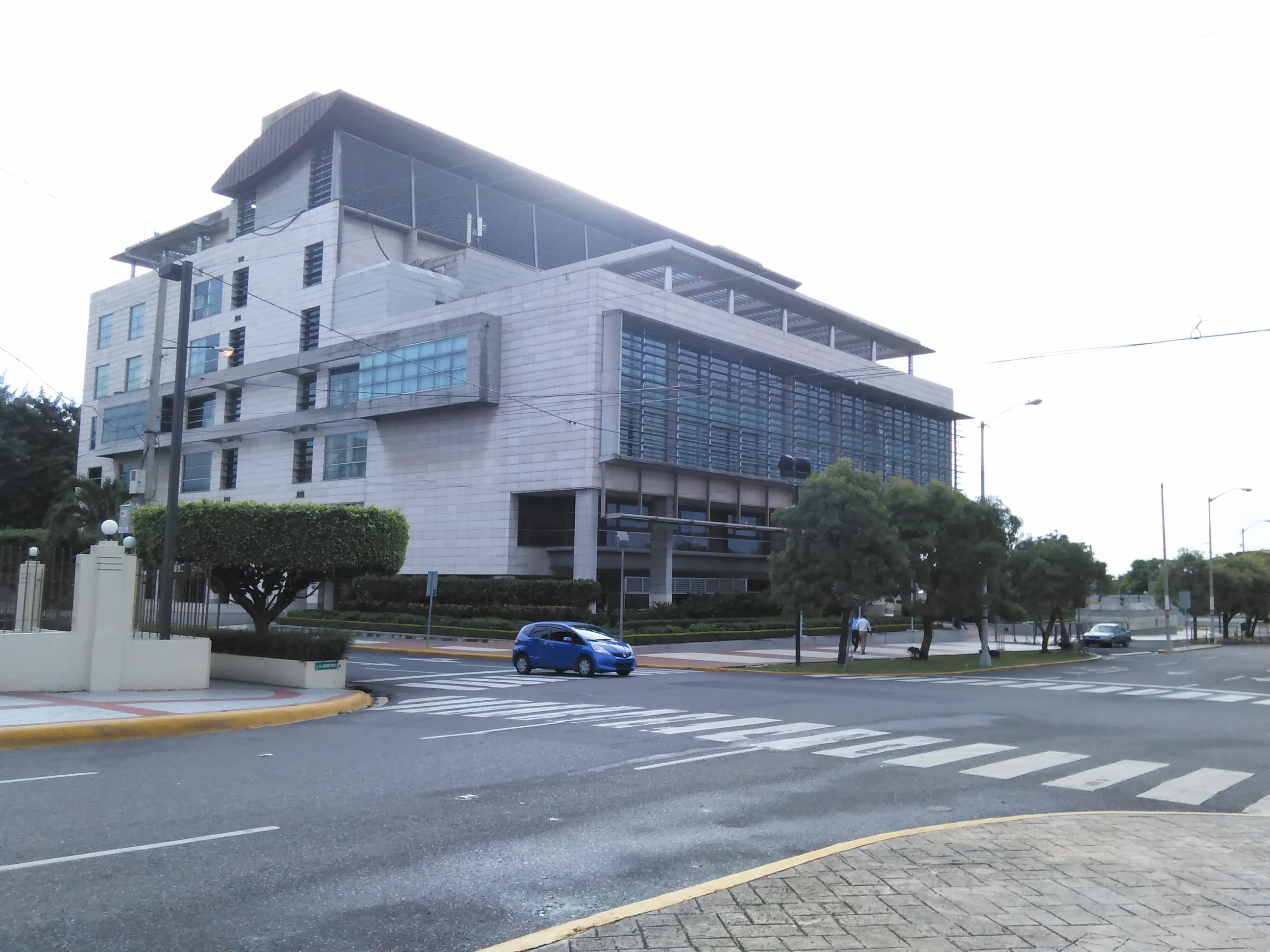
Centro de los Héroes neighborhood

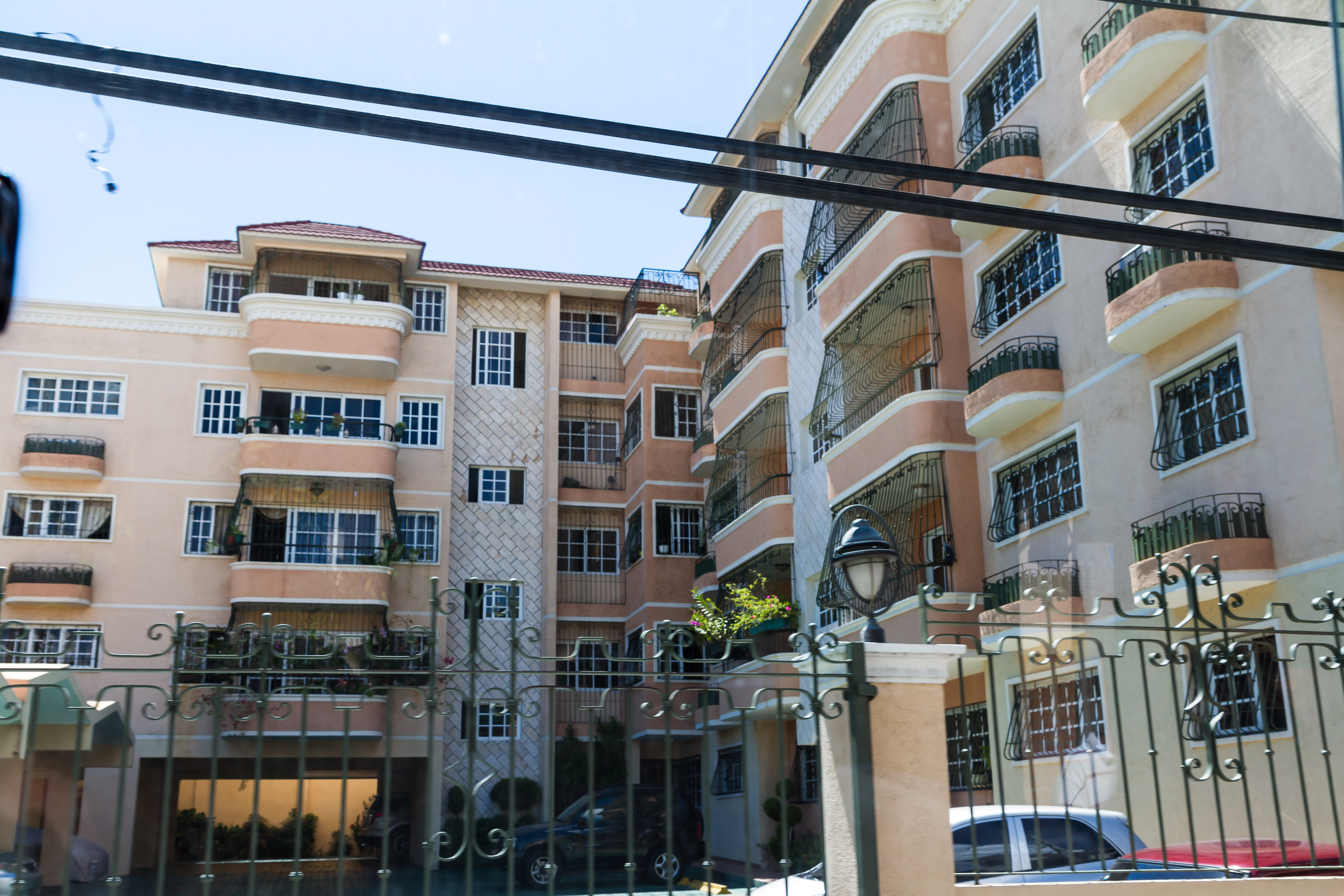
Gazcue neighborhood, Dominican Republic

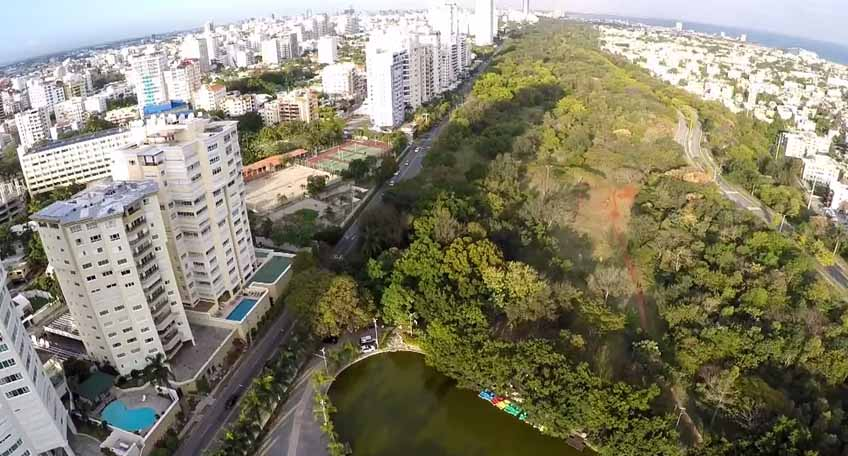
Parque Mirador Sur, Santo Domingo

Sector	Population
Altos de Arroyo Hondo	27,692
Arroyo Manzano	19,151
Atala	17,617
Bella Vista	28,253
Buenos Aires-Independencia	14,759
Cacique	14,384
Centro de los Héroes	2,045
Centro Olímpico Duarte	36
Cerros de Arroyo Hondo	24,486
Ciudad Colonial	1,339
Ciudad Nueva	1,423
Ciudad Universitaria	33,812
Cristo Rey	42,140
Domingo Sabio	7,359
El Millón	10,401
Ensanche Capotillo	27,613
Ensanche Espaillat	25,045
Ensanche La Fé	43,765
Ensanche Luperón	14,167
Ensanche Naco	9,227
Gazcue	14,308
General Antonio Duvergé	11,981
Gualey	13,539
Honduras del Norte	9,820
Honduras del Oeste	9,679
Jardín Botánico	21
Jardín Zoológico	177
Jardines del Sur	4,004
Julieta Morales	14,729
La Agustina	14,028
La Esperilla	14,807
La Hondonada	18,795
La Isabela	17,653
La Julia	17,254
La Zurza	11,982
Los Cacicazgos	15,633
Los Jardines	17,599
Los Peralejos	6,651
Los Prados	12,454
Los Restauradores	6,236
Los Ríos	13,886
María Auxiliadora	31,639
Mata Hambre	12,823
Mejoramiento Social	39,889
Mirador Norte	40,104
Mirador Sur	41,927
Miraflores	38,449
Miramar	11,051
Nuestra Señora de la Paz	8,729
Nuevo Arroyo Hondo	20,259
Palma Real	7,803
Paraíso	26,021
Paseo de los Indios	6,697
Piantini	52,483
Puerto Isabela	38,449
Quisqueya	24,933
Renacimiento	21,912
San Carlos	26,008
San Diego	14,063
San Gerónimo	13,987
San Juan Bosco	21,198
Simón Bolívar	39,069
Treinta de Mayo	30,159
Tropical Metaldom	2,601
Veinticuatro de Abril	21,181
Viejo Arroyo Hondo	49,495
Villa Consuelo	54,065
Villa Francisca	49,397
Villa Juana	46,268
Villas Agricolas	2,140
Distrito Nacional	1,402,749
