= Central Santo Domingo =

Coordinates: 18.477167°N 69.932871°W

Central Santo Domingo or better known as Polígono Central (English: Central Polygon) is a term used to group several neighborhoods located in central Santo Domingo, Distrito Nacional, Dominican Republic defined as the area delineated by John F Kennedy Avenue (also known as DR-1) on the north, on the west by Winston Churchill avenue, on the east by Maximo Gomez avenue, and on the south by 27 de Febrero avenue (also known as DR-3).

The centric area forms the core of the city of Santo Domingo which includes the neighborhoods of Naco, Piantini, Paraíso, and Yolanda Morales. This central polygon, as the name implies, serves as the main economic and business center of the city. The neighborhoods within the bounds of Downtown are granted higher-desinty zoning by the Ayuntamiento del Distrito Nacional. Some of the most affluent neighborhoods of Santo Domingo are located within the downtown even as growth has overflowed to other locations outside the area. Piantini, Naco, & Paraiso all experience high levels of urbanization and better than average quality of life. The area is mostly composed of mixed-development zoning having most of the commercial zoning on the main avenues while having mostly residential zoning in the inner streets.

Some of the most important avenues of the city are located in the Polígono Central including Winston Churchill avenue with very high banking and commercial activity, and Abraham Lincoln avenue serving as the main thoroughfare of the city-center. Since the late 1990s a general trend of vertical growth has been experienced throughout the area creating complications of traffic and lack of appropriate infrastructure to handle the higher density levels. Most of Downtown Santo Domingo does not have the adequate infrastructure to handle high-density office and residential buildings. During the late 1990s, it was mostly composed of large family homes and low-rise buildings. Rapid urbanization has led to solutions like the new Santo Domingo Metro and the creation of two express urban highway that serve as the northern and southern boundary of the city center.

== Neighborhoods ==
This is a list of the neighborhoods located within the boundaries of Downtown Santo Domingo.

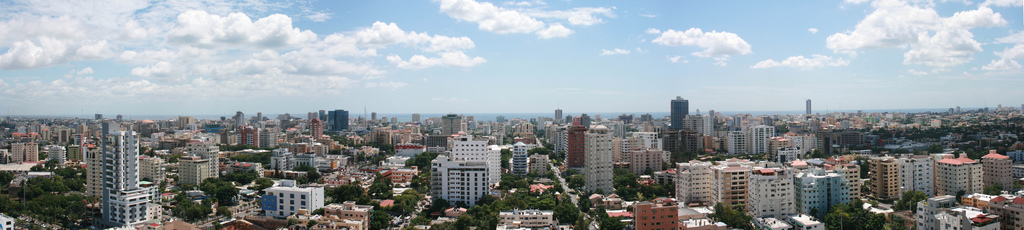
Western part of Downtown Santo Domingo from the North. Novo Centro, Piantini and Citibank Tower among the commercial towers visible
- Paraiso is located in the northwest corner of Downtown Santo Domingo bounded by Expreso Kennedy, Winston Churchill, Charles Sumner, and Abraham Lincoln avenues North, West, South, and East respectively. The neighborhood has experienced increased development with the construction of mid and high-rise residential apartment. Some locations of interest are the Club Paraiso, Colegio Claret, the headquarters of INDOTEL, and Plaza Paraiso.
- Yolanda Morales is a neighborhood sandwiched between Paraiso to the north and the more upscale neighborhood Piantini to the south. It is bounded to the west Winston Churchill Avenue and to the east by Abraham Lincoln. In recent years, like the rest of Central Santo Domingo the neighborhood has seen increased vertical development with the construction of mid and high-rise development. Blue Mall is set to open its door by 2011 making the newest addition to the neighborhood.
- Piantini is located in the southwest corner of Downtown Santo Domingo directly below Yolanda Morales. Piantini has been for the past decades one of the most affluent neighborhoods of Santo Domingo composed of mostly the upper-class citizens. It has undergone a transformation from a low-density neighborhood to a present one with high levels of urbanization which has made Piantini one of the most dense neighborhoods of the city with impressive land value when compared to the city's average. Bounded by Winston Churchill Avenue to the west it is home to Citibank Tower/Acropolis Mall, Plaza Central, Banco de Reservas, Plaza de Las Americas, and Scotiabank. To the south it is bounded by Expreso 27 de Febrero avenue which serves as the main corridor of the city. To the east it is bounded by Abraham Lincoln Avenue the main artery across Downtown Santo Domingo. Along this avenue there is a high concentration plaza, and finance towers the most important being Plaza La Francesa, Unicentro Plaza, Torre Piantini, Novocentro. Piantini has grown in a way in which all commercial activity is mostly found in the avenues that bound it while its center is densely residential causing a lot of traffic and infrastructure problems for a neighborhood that wasn't originally planned to withstand such density.
- Serralles is a neighborhood located in the North of the polígono central roughly bounded by John F Kennedy Avenue (DR-1) to the North, Abraham Lincoln Avenue to the west, Gustavo Mejia Ricart avenue to the south and Lope De Vega Avenue to the east.
- Naco is located in the south-central section of Downtown Santo Domingo. It is bounded by Expreso 27 de Febrero to the south, Gustavo Mejia Ricart to the North, Abraham Lincoln to the west, Lope de Vega to the Northwest, and Tiradente avenue to the East. A very affluent neighborhood like Piantini it has many plazas, office buildings, and mid-rise residencies. The particular neighborhood is also notable because it has a small 3x3 block area of informal settlement (named La Yuca) contrasting the rest of the affluent neighborhood a primary example of the unequal distribution of wealth that affects the city.
- Arboleda is a small neighborhood located in the southeast corner of Downtown Santo Domingo in between what is Naco and Centro Olimpico Juan Pablo Duarte. Sometimes it is also grouped together as part of Naco due to its small sized and for Naco being a more upscale neighborhood. Its boundary is roughly defined as everything south of the Gustavo Mejia Recart avenue ending at the 27 de Febrero corridor. Its eastern border is Jose Ortega y Gasset Avenue and the COJPD complex while its western border lies at the Tiradentes avenue.

== Recreation ==
Club Paraiso and Club Naco each located in their respective neighborhoods are private members-only social clubs that offer sporting facilities and activities on a daily basis. Club Naco being one of the most prestigious clubs in Santo Domingo. Also within central Santo Domingo is the national Olympic park - Centro Olimpico Juan Pablo Duarte - offering a wide range of recreational opportunities. Additionally, several small patches of green spaces dot the city-center.

=== Centro Olimpico Juan Pablo Duarte ===
Centro Olimpico Juan Pablo Duarte is the main sport center of the city of Santo Domingo and occupies roughly the eastern fourth of the Polígono Central. Limited by Kennedy, Gomez, and 27 de Febrero avenues it serves as a multi-sport facility in which the 2003 Pan American Games and the 1974 Central American and Caribbean Games were hosted. Popular events like the Festival Presidente de la Musica Latina and concerts by The Jonas Brothers, The Killers, Maroon 5, La Ley, Shakira, Tiësto, and many other music artists have taken place in the Estadio Olimpico Felix Sanchez in the COJPD.

== Transportation ==
Public transportation is handled by the Santo Domingo Metro and the OMSA bus system

=== Santo Domingo Metro ===
Downtown Santo Domingo is currently served by line 1 of the Santo Domingo Metro on the intersections of Maximo Gomez with DR-1 and DR-3. Currently on construction is line 2 of the system which will have stops along Expreso John F Kennedy and avenues Winston Churchill, Abraham Lincoln, Lope de Vega, & Ortega & Gasset. In the near future, the construction of line 3 of the metro system along Expreso 27 de Febrero (DR-3) will enclose Downtown Santo Domingo with full mass transportation access.

=== OMSA ===
Downtown Santo Domingo is currently served by the bus service provided by the Oficina Metropolitana de Servicios de Autobuses which provides bus service along the John F Kennedy & 27 de Febrero corridors (west/east), and along the Maximo Gomez, Winston Churchill and Tiradentes avenues (north/south). The service is plagued by the lack of funding by the government therefore it is infrequent.

=== Private ===
Private transportation is by far currently the most popular form of transportation in Downtown Santo Domingo and as a consequence the city streets are plagued with traffic congestion. With the completion of Corredor Duarte (2010) and line 2 (2012) of the Santo Domingo Metro a relieve to the current chaos could be accomplished.

== Avenues ==
Winston Churchill is a north–south avenue that runs through the western boundary of Downtown Santo Domingo. It borders to the west the neighborhoods of Paraiso, Yolanda Morales, and Piantini and borders to the east the middle-class neighborhood Ensanche Julieta and Evarito Morales. Winston Churchill avenue is host to the largest concentration of commercial malls and banks in the city including Multicentro La Sirena/Super Pola, Mall at the Acropolis, Blue Mall, Supermercado Bravo and locations of Scotiabank, Citibank, Banreservas, Banco del Progreso and a significant amount of international fast food chains.

Abraham Lincoln avenue is north–south avenue in the core of Downtown Santo Domingo. It serves as the major thoroughfare of the center and services the neighborhoods of Piantini, Naco, Yolanda Morales, Paraiso, and Seralles. A major avenue for business and offices and a variety of Shopping plazas are also located in the avenue. Lope De Vega Avenue starts out in Abraham Lincoln Avenue and splits off in a Northeast direction towards John F Kennedy Avenue.

=== Maximo Gomez ===
Maximo Gomez part of DR-13 is the eastern border of Downtown Santo Domingo.

=== John F Kennedy ===
A short section of DR-1 named Expreso John F Kennedy runs through the north of Downtown Santo Domingo. It is composed of a series of elevated express viaduct which run above the intersection of Winston Churchill, Abraham Lincoln, Lope De Vega, Tiradentes, and Ortega & Gasset avenues. An underpass under Maximo Gomez completes John F Kennedy as an urban corridor. To the west of Downtown Santo Domingo the corridor become highway Juan Pablo Duarte and to the east it becomes Expreso Quinto Centenario.

== See also ==
- Santo Domingo
- Greater Santo Domingo
- National District
- Santo Domingo Metro
