= Adrover =

Adrover is a Spanish surname. Notable people with the surname include:

- Ana Mato Adrover (born 1959), Spanish politician
- Antoni Lluís Adrover Colom (born 1982), Spanish footballer
- Gabriel Mato Adrover (born 1961), Spanish People's Party politician
- Miguel Adrover (1922–1945), Spanish footballer
- Miguel Adrover (born 1965), Spanish fashion designer

== See also ==
- Antònia Adroher i Pascual (1915–2007), Spanish teacher and political activist
- Jordi Adroher (born 1984), Spanish international roller hockey player
