= Jardín Botánico =

Jardín Botánico (Spanish for botanical garden) may refer to one of a number of sites. Relevant Wikipedia articles include:

- Buenos Aires Botanical Garden, Buenos Aires, Argentina (Jardín Botánico Carlos Thays de la Ciudad Autónoma de Buenos Aires)
- Real Jardín Botánico de Madrid, Madrid, Spain
- Mehan Garden, Manila, Philippines
- Botanical Garden of Mérida, Mérida, Venezuela (Centro Jardín Botánico de Mérida)
- Jardín Botánico (Distrito Nacional), sector of Santo Domingo, Dominican Republic
  - contains the Dr. Rafael Ma. Moscoso National Botanical Garden
