= Miguel Adrover =

Miguel Adrover may refer to:

- Miguel Adrover (footballer) (1922–1945), Spanish footballer
- Miguel Adrover (fashion designer) (born 1965), Spanish fashion designer
