= Cerros de Arroyo Hondo =

- Location within the Dominican Republic
- Coordinates: 18.514°N 69.936°W
- Country: Dominican Republic
- Province: Distrito Nacional

Government
  - Mayor: Carolina Mejía (PRM)

Population (2008)
  - Total: 28,762
- Time zone: UTC−04:00
- Postal code: 10504
- Website: adn.gob.do (in Spanish)

Cerros de Arroyo Hondo is a Sector in the city of Santo Domingo in the Distrito Nacional of the Dominican Republic. This neighborhood is populated in particular by individuals from the upper class.

== Sources ==
- Distrito Nacional sectors
