= Los Jardines (disambiguation) =

Los Jardines are phantom islands supposedly located northeast of the Mariana Islands, near Guam.

Los Jardines may also refer to:

- Los Jardines (Dominican Republic), a Santo Domingo sector
- Los Jardines station (Caracas), a metro station in Venezuela
- Los Jardines metro station (Lima), Peru
