= Julieta Morales =

- Location within the Dominican Republic
- Coordinates: 18°30′N 69°59′W
- Country: Dominican Republic
- Province: Distrito Nacional

Government
  - Mayor: Carolina Mejía

Population (2008)
  - Total: 7,234
- Demonym: capitaleño/capitaleña
- Time zone: UTC-4
- Website: http://www.adn.gov.do/

Julieta Morales is a sector in the city of Santo Domingo in the Distrito Nacional of the Dominican Republic. This sector is populated in particular by individuals from the upper middle class.

== Sources ==
- Distrito Nacional sectors
