= La Julia =

- Location within the Dominican Republic
- Coordinates: 18°30′N 69°59′W
- Country: Dominican Republic
- Province: Distrito Nacional

Government
  - Mayor: Carolina Mejia

Population (2008)
  - Total: 12,575
- Demonym: capitaleño/capitaleña
- Time zone: UTC-4 UTC
  - Summer (DST): UTCNone
- Website: adn.gob.do (in Spanish)

La Julia is a sector of the city of Santo Domingo in the Distrito Nacional of the Dominican Republic, particularly populated by upper-class people, for example, the current president of the Dominican Republic, Luis Abinader, resides in this sector.

== Sources ==
- Distrito Nacional sectors
