= Los Ríos, Distrito Nacional =

Los Ríos
- Location within the Dominican Republic
- Coordinates: 18°30′N 69°59′W
- Country: Dominican Republic 1
- Province: Distrito Nacional

Government
  - Mayor: Carolina Mejía

Population (2008)
  - Total: 250,985
- Demonym: capitaleño/capitaleña
- Time zone: UTC-4 UTC
  - Summer (DST): UTCNone
- Website: adn.gob.do (in Spanish)

Los Ríos is a sector in the city of Santo Domingo in the Distrito Nacional of the Dominican Republic. It was founded by ex-president Joaquin Balaguer. Los Ríos is in particular populated by individuals from the middle class. This sector is made up of several districts such as Barrio Azul, Jarro Sucio, Los Multi, Las 8Cienta, La Caña, La Esperanza, Villa Elena, Los Pinos, La Guayubin, and also the areas of large residences, which is next to Diabetes Hospital, the INTEC University and the Botanical Garden. Its main street is the Circunvalacion Avenue.

== Sources ==
- Distrito Nacional sectors
