= La Esperilla =

- Location within the Dominican Republic
- Coordinates: 18°30′N 69°59′W
- Country: Dominican Republic
- Province: Distrito Nacional

Government
  - Mayor: Carolina Mejía

Population (2008)
  - Total: 12,573
- Demonym: capitaleño/capitaleña
- Time zone: UTC-4
- Postal code: 10106
- Website: adn.gob.do (in Spanish)

La Esperilla is a Sector in the city of Santo Domingo in the Distrito Nacional of the Dominican Republic. La Esperilla is mainly populated by individuals from the Upper class.

== Sources ==
- Distrito Nacional sectors
