= Jardín Botánico (Distrito Nacional) =

Jardín Botanico
- Location within the Dominican Republic
- Coordinates: 18°25′0″N 69°38′0″W
- Country: Dominican Republic
- Province: Distrito Nacional

Government
  - Mayor: Carolina Mejía

Population (2019)
  - Total: 4,351
- Demonym: capitaleño/capitaleña
- Time zone: UTC-4:00
- Website: adn.gob.do (in Spanish)

Jardín Botánico is a sector in the city of Santo Domingo in the Distrito Nacional of the Dominican Republic. Jardín Botánico attracts most visitors with its lush botanical garden Dr. Rafael Ma. Moscoso National Botanical Garden, estimated to be over 120 hectares (300 acres).

== Sources ==
- Distrito Nacional sectors
