= Gualey =

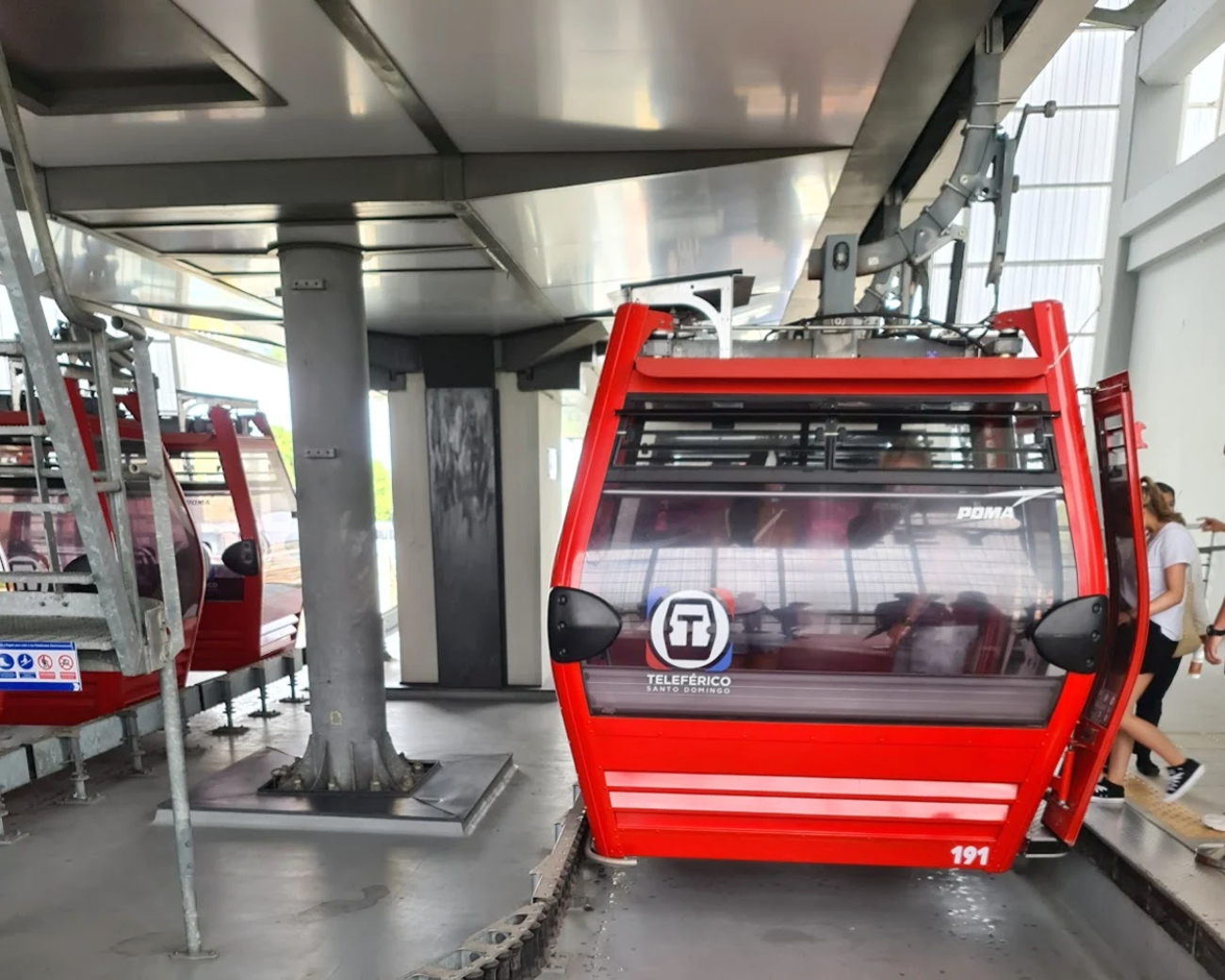

- Location within the Dominican Republic
- Coordinates: 18°30′N 69°59′W
- Country: Dominican Republic
- Province: Distrito Nacional

Government
  - Mayor: Carolina Mejia

Population (2008)
  - Total: 10,747
- Demonym: capitaleño/capitaleña
- Time zone: UTC-4
- Website: adn.gob.do (in Spanish)

Gualey is a Sector in the city of Santo Domingo in the Distrito Nacional of the Dominican Republic. This neighborhood is populated in particular by individuals from the lower class.

== Sources ==
- Distrito Nacional sectors
