= 24 de Abril =

- Location within the Dominican Republic
- Coordinates: 18.50593157711257°N 69.89326986061235°W
- Country: Dominican Republic
- Province: Distrito Nacional

Government
  - Mayor: Carolina Mejía

Population (2008)
  - Total: 75,674
- Demonym: capitaleño/capitaleña
- Time zone: UTC−04:00
- Postal code: 10404
- Postal code: 10803
- Website: adn.gob.do (in Spanish)

24 de Abril is a neighbourhood in the city of Santo Domingo in the Distrito Nacional of the Dominican Republic. This neighbourhood is populated in particular by individuals from the lower middle class.

== Sources ==
- Distrito Nacional sectors
