= Cristo Rey, Distrito Nacional =

Cristo Rey
- Location within the Dominican Republic
- Coordinates: 18°29′29″N 69°55′18″W
- Country: Dominican Republic
- Province: Distrito Nacional

Government
  - Mayor: Carolina Mejía (PRM)
  - Council members: List: Argelys Jiménez Bierd (PRM); Dewar Crousett Rojas (PRM); Edgar E. Javier Monte De Oca (PRM); Felix Mateo Lugo (PRM); Felix Perdomo Figueroa (PRM); Shade Medina Genao (PRM); Jairo Doñe De La Cruz (FP); Manuel H. García Del Rosario (FP); Domingo Antonio Corniel Sosa (PLD)
  - Senator: Omar Fernández (FP)
  - Deputies: List: Alfredo Pacheco Osoria (PRM); Manuel de Jesús Núñez Guerrero (PRM); Maribel Altagracia Almánzar de Ogando (PRM); Rafael Anibal Diaz Rodriguez (PRM); Rafael Tobías Crespo Pérez (FP); Ramón Antonio Bueno Patiño (PRM)

Population (2022)
  - Total: 56,592
- Demonym: Spanish: Capitaleño (fem. Capitaleña)
- Time zone: UTC−04:00 (AST)
- Postal code: 10501
- Website: adn.gob.do (in Spanish)

Cristo Rey is a sector in the city of Santo Domingo in the Distrito Nacional of the Dominican Republic. The neighbourhood is populated by the lower middle class. This heavily populated area was formed in the last major resettlement for industrious peasants mostly coming from the North of the country, especially around 1970–1974, when the National Zoo was built on the Arroyo Riverside. The area is notorious for crime, being one of the most dangerous neighborhoods in Santo Domingo.
