= Centro de Los Heroes =

- Location within the Dominican Republic
- Coordinates: 18°30′N 69°59′W
- Country: Dominican Republic
- Province: Distrito Nacional

Government
  - Mayor: Carolina Mejía

Population (2008)
  - Total: 26,780
- Demonym: capitaleño/capitaleña
- Time zone: UTC-4
- Postal code: 10101
- Website: adn.gob.do (in Spanish)

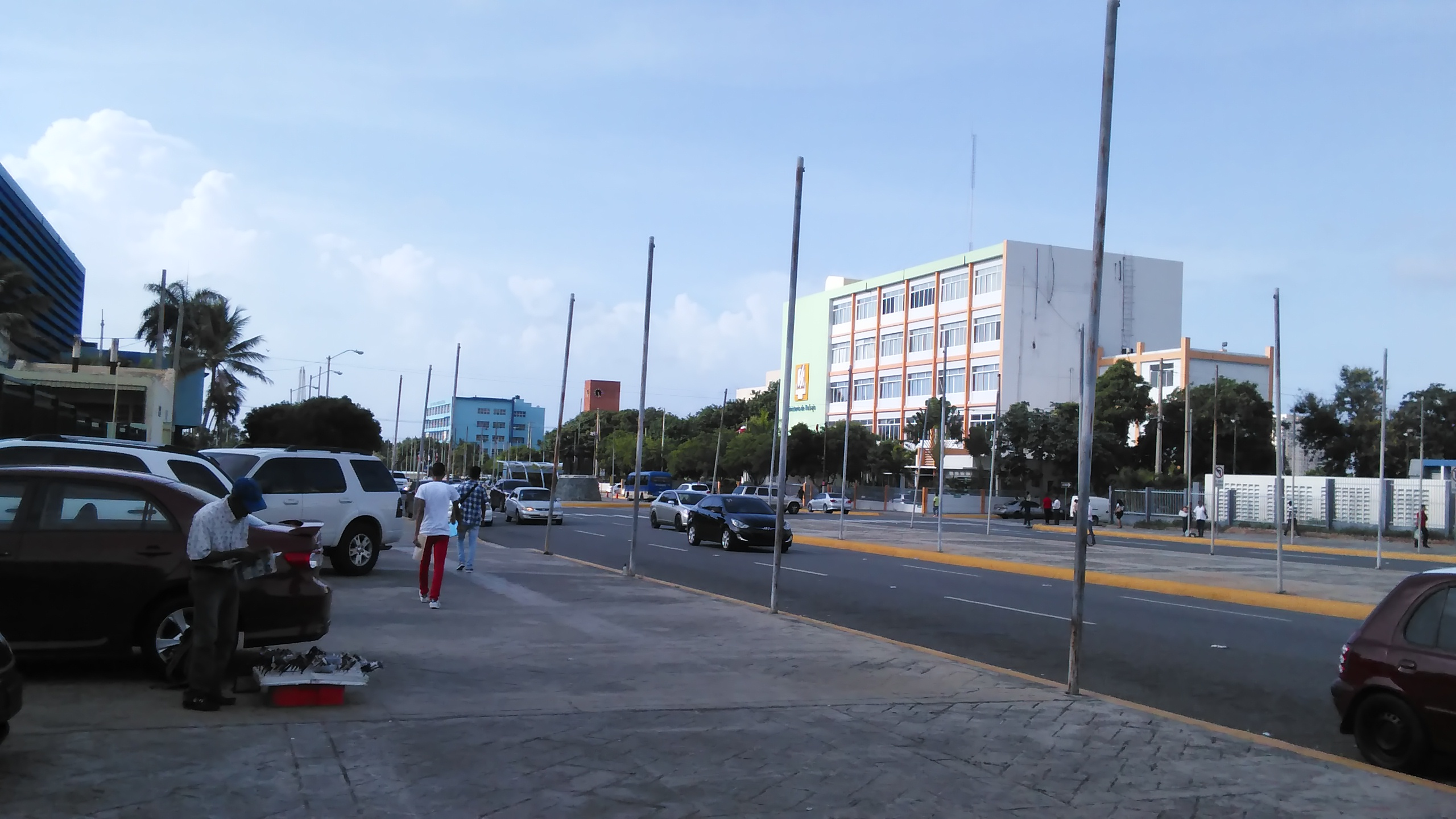
Centro de los Héroes in 2017

Centro de Los Heroes is a sector or neighborhood in the city of Santo Domingo in the Distrito Nacional of the Dominican Republic.

== Sources ==
- Distrito Nacional sectors
