= Villa Juana =

- Sector
- Villa Juana highlighted in red

- Location within the Dominican Republic
- Coordinates: 18.489643°N 69.908923°W
- Country: Dominican Republic
- Province: Distrito Nacional
- Founded: 1947

Government
  - Mayor: Carolina Mejía

Population (2017)
  - Total: 28,621
- Demonym: capitaleño/capitaleña
- Time zone: UTC-4
- Website: adn.gob.do (in Spanish)

Villa Juana is a neighborhood located north of San Martín Avenue and east of Máximo Gómez Avenue, in the city of Santo Domingo in the Distrito Nacional of the Dominican Republic. Along with Villa Consuelo and Villa Francisca, it is one of the three neighborhoods that emerged after Hurricane San Zenón devastated Santo Domingo in 1930. Today, it has become an emblematic area of the capital, full of workshops and spare parts for cars, although unlike its neighbor Villa Consuelo, this neighborhood is much more residential. It is a historical, social, and cultural landmark in the development of the capital of the Dominican Republic.

== History ==
The name "Juana" originates from Juana Battle Rojas, a descendant of cubans, who married Buenaventura Peña in 1900. Peña, along with his partner Emilio Tejera Bonetti, was involved in selling residential land through their company, Compañía de Inversiones Urbanas. They sold the land where Villa Juana is located today, which at that time was known as Las Arras or Los Potreros de Venturita. Buenaventura Peña became seriously ill in 1946, and his wife unexpectedly died before him. Finally, the couple's sons, Manuel Arturo and Osvaldo José, founded the Villa Juana neighborhood on July 11, 1947, by ordinance of the City Council of the Distrito Nacional (then part of Santo Domingo).

As part of the growth of the city of Santo Domingo (then Ciudad Trujillo), Rafael Leónidas Trujillo personally demanded that the streets be wide, with ample sidewalks to allow for the planting of trees; in addition, he set aside an entire block for the construction of a school, which would be named "Escuela República Dominicana," to make it the largest in the Dominican public education system, making Villa Juana a personal project.

Between 1989 and 1992, during the administration of Joaquín Balaguer, the eastern part of Villa Juana was razed for the construction of the "Expreso V Centenario", creating a dividing barrier between Villa Juana and Villa Consuelo

During the years 2009 to 2013, Villa Juana benefited from the construction of the two lines of the Santo Domingo Metro, in stations such as "Peña Battle" of Line 1 and "Mauricio Báez" of Line 2, which serve the Villa Juana sector.

In November 2021, the "Alcaldía de Distrito Nacional" carried out an urban intervention on the sidewalks around the Máximo Gómez National Cemetery (Cementerio Nacional), called "Villa Juana Peatonal", benefiting the residents of this sector.

In February 2021, a renovation was carried out on the roof of the Mauricio Báez club, due to a fire in the lower roof, in which the waters that were thrown affected the structures.

== Transport ==
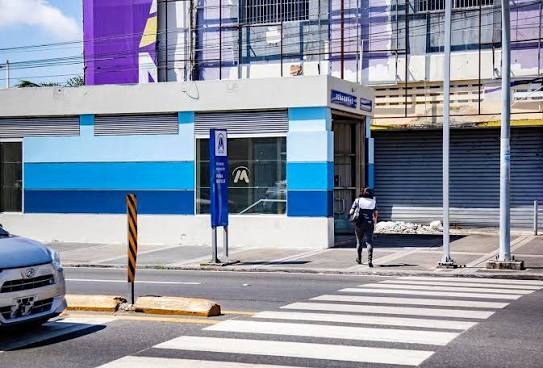
Peña Battle station on Line 1, near Villa Juana

Villa Juana has an extensive network of roads connecting it to this area. Avenues such as:

• Máximo Gómez Avenue

• Pedro Livio Cedeño Avenue

• Juan Pablo Duarte Avenue

• San Martín Avenue

are some of the avenues that surround this area and connect it to other parts of the city. The two lines of the Santo Domingo Metro also run through this area, providing easy access to this mass transit system.

== Points of interest ==
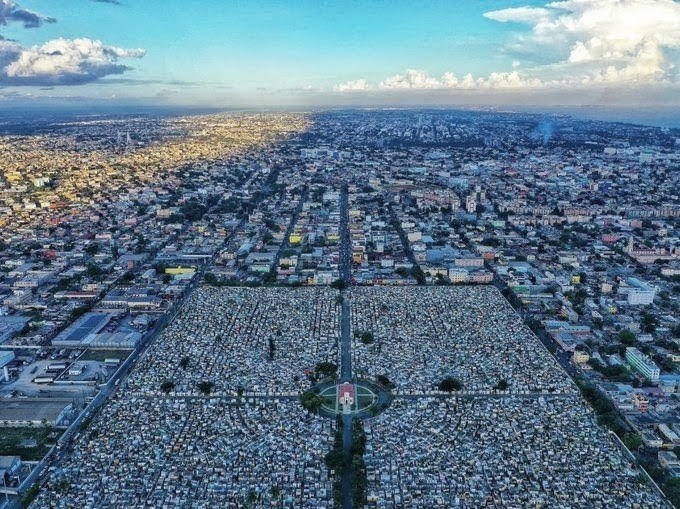
"Cementerio Nacional" from a drone, with a complete view of Villa Juana

Villa Juana boasts several points of cultural, historical, sporting, and religious interest, including:

• The Mauricio Báez Club, founded in 1963, is the most important sports center in the area, along with the Mauricio Báez Cultural Center, whose final phase was inaugurated in 2009, and the "Liceo Mauricio Báez".

• The "Escuela República Dominicana", one of the largest and oldest educational institutions in the area, dating back to the mid-20th century.

• The "Parroquia Sagrado Corazón de Jesús", a significant religious center in the heart of the neighborhood, founded on November 1, 1961, under the administration of the Salesians of Don Bosco.

• The Máximo Gómez National Cemetery, inaugurated in 1943 during the Trujillo era, serves as a center for family mausoleums, and as an ancient monument.

== Notable residents ==
• Leonel Fernández, expresident of the Dominican Republic

• Johnny Ventura, renowned Dominican merengue singer

== Sources ==
- Distrito Nacional sectors
