= Bella Vista, Dominican Republic =

Bella Vista
- Location within the Dominican Republic
- Coordinates: 18°30′N 69°59′W
- Country: Dominican Republic
- Province: Distrito Nacional

Government
  - Mayor: Carolina Mejía

Population (2008)
  - Total: 175,683
- Demonym: capitaleño/capitaleña
- Time zone: UTC−04:00
- Postal code: 10111
- Postal code: 10112
- Website: adn.gob.do (in Spanish)

Bella Vista is a sector or neighborhood in the city of Santo Domingo in the Distrito Nacional of the Dominican Republic. Bella Vista is in particular populated by individuals from the upper class.

== Sources ==
- Distrito Nacional sectors
