= Mirador Norte =

- Location within the Dominican Republic
- Coordinates: 18°30′N 69°59′W
- Country: Dominican Republic
- Province: Distrito Nacional

Government
  - Mayor: Carolina Mejía

Population (2008)
  - Total: 20,465
- Demonym: capitaleño/capitaleña
- Time zone: UTC-4 UTC
  - Summer (DST): UTCNone
- Website: adn.gob.do (in Spanish)

Mirador Norte is a sector or neighborhood in the city of Santo Domingo in the Distrito Nacional of the Dominican Republic. Mirador Norte is in particular populated by individuals from the upper and upper middle classes.

== Sources ==
- Distrito Nacional sectors
