= Barrio Obrero =

Barrio Obrero may refer to:

- Barrio Obrero (Asunción), Paraguay
- Barrio Obrero (Santurce), Puerto Rico
- Barrio Obrero, a place in Altos de Arroyo Hondo, Dominican Republic
