= La Hondonada =

- Location within the Dominican Republic
- Coordinates: 18°30′N 69°59′W
- Country: Dominican Republic
- Province: Distrito Nacional

Government
  - Mayor: Roberto Salcedo

Population (2008)
  - Total: 14,575
- Demonym: capitaleño/capitaleña
- Time zone: UTC-4 UTC
  - Summer (DST): UTCNone
- Website: http://www.adn.gov.do/

La Hondonada is a sector in the city of Santo Domingo of the Distrito Nacional in the Dominican Republic. This neighborhood is populated in particular by individuals from the lower class.

== Sources ==
- Distrito Nacional sectors
