= Ensanche Espaillat =

- Neighborhood of Santo Domingo
- Location within the Dominican Republic
- Coordinates: 18°30′N 69°59′W
- Province: Distrito Nacional
- City: Santo Domingo

Government
  - Mayor: Carolina Mejía

Population (2008)
  - Total: 16,872
- Demonym: capitaleño/capitaleña
- Time zone: UTC-4 UTC
  - Summer (DST): UTCNone
- Postal code: 10402
- Website: adn.gob.do (in Spanish)

Ensanche Espaillat is a neighborhood in the city of Santo Domingo in the Distrito Nacional of the Dominican Republic. This neighborhood is populated in particular by individuals from the middle class.
