= Altos de Arroyo Hondo =

- Location within the Dominican Republic
- Coordinates: 18°30′N 69°59′W
- Country: Dominican Republic
- District: Distrito Nacional

Government
  - Mayor: Carolina Mejía (PRM)

Population (2008)
  - Total: 86,424
- Demonym: capitaleño/capitaleña
- Time zone: UTC−04:00
- Postal code: 10605
- Website: adn.gob.do (in Spanish)

Altos de Arroyo Hondo is a neighbourhood in the city of Santo Domingo in the Distrito Nacional of the Dominican Republic. This neighbourhood is populated in particular by individuals from the upper middle and upper classes.
