= Buenos Aires, Dominican Republic =

Buenos Aires Independencia
- Location within the Dominican Republic
- Coordinates: 18°30′N 69°59′W
- Country: Dominican Republic
- Province: Distrito Nacional

Government
  - Mayor: Carolina Mejía

Population (2008)
  - Total: 56,846
- Demonym: capitaleño/capitaleña
- Time zone: UTC−04:00
- Postal code: 11102
- Website: adn.gob.do (in Spanish)

Buenos Aires or Independencia is a sector in the city of Santo Domingo in the Distrito Nacional of the Dominican Republic.

It is characterized by its peaceful environment, as a contrast to the tumultuous and hectic pace found at its entrance. It is mostly a residential area, with few business establishments which are mainly located at the entrance of the area.

== Sources ==
- Distrito Nacional sectors
