= Villa Consuelo =

- Location within the Dominican Republic
- Coordinates: 18°30′N 69°59′W
- Country: Dominican Republic
- Province: Distrito Nacional

Government
  - Mayor: Carolina Mejia

Population (2008)
  - Total: 28,621
- Demonym: capitaleño/capitaleña
- Time zone: UTC-4 UTC
  - Summer (DST): UTCNone
- Website: adn.gob.do (in Spanish)

Villa Consuelo is a neighbourhood in the city of Santo Domingo in the Distrito Nacional of the Dominican Republic. This neighbourhood is populated in particular by individuals from the lower middle class.

== Sources ==
- Distrito Nacional sectors
