= Simón Bolívar, Distrito Nacional =

Simón Bolívar El Bolívar
- Location within the Dominican Republic
- Coordinates: 18°30′N 69°59′W
- Country: Dominican Republic
- Province: Distrito Nacional

Government
  - Mayor: Carolina Mejía

Population (2008)
  - Total: 18,463
- Demonym: capitaleño/capitaleña
- Time zone: UTC-4 UTC
  - Summer (DST): UTCNone
- Website: adn.gob.do (in Spanish)

Simón Bolívar is a neighborhood of the city of Santo Domingo, in the Distrito Nacional (National District) of the Dominican Republic. It is located on the western bank of the Ozama River, adjacent to the neighborhoods of La Cañita and Capotillo.
