= Mata Hambre =

- Country: Dominican Republic
- Province: Distrito Nacional
- Time zone: UTC-4 UTC
  - Summer (DST): UTCNone

Mata Hambre is a sector in the city of Santo Domingo in the Distrito Nacional of the Dominican Republic.
