= Ensanche Capotillo =

Ensanche Capotillo El Capotillo
- Location within the Dominican Republic
- Coordinates: 18°30′N 69°59′W
- Country: Dominican Republic
- Province: Distrito Nacional

Government
  - Mayor: Carolina Mejia

Population (2008)
  - Total: 36,789
- Demonym: capitaleño/capitaleña
- Time zone: UTC-4 UTC
  - Summer (DST): UTCNone
- Postal code: 10407
- Website: adn.gob.do (in Spanish)

Ensanche Capotillo is a Sector in the city of Santo Domingo in the Distrito Nacional of the Dominican Republic. This neighborhood is populated in particular by individuals from the working class.

== Notable people ==
- Santiago Matías Known as Alofoke is a Dominican businessman and media mogul.
