= Gascue =

Gascue Gazcue
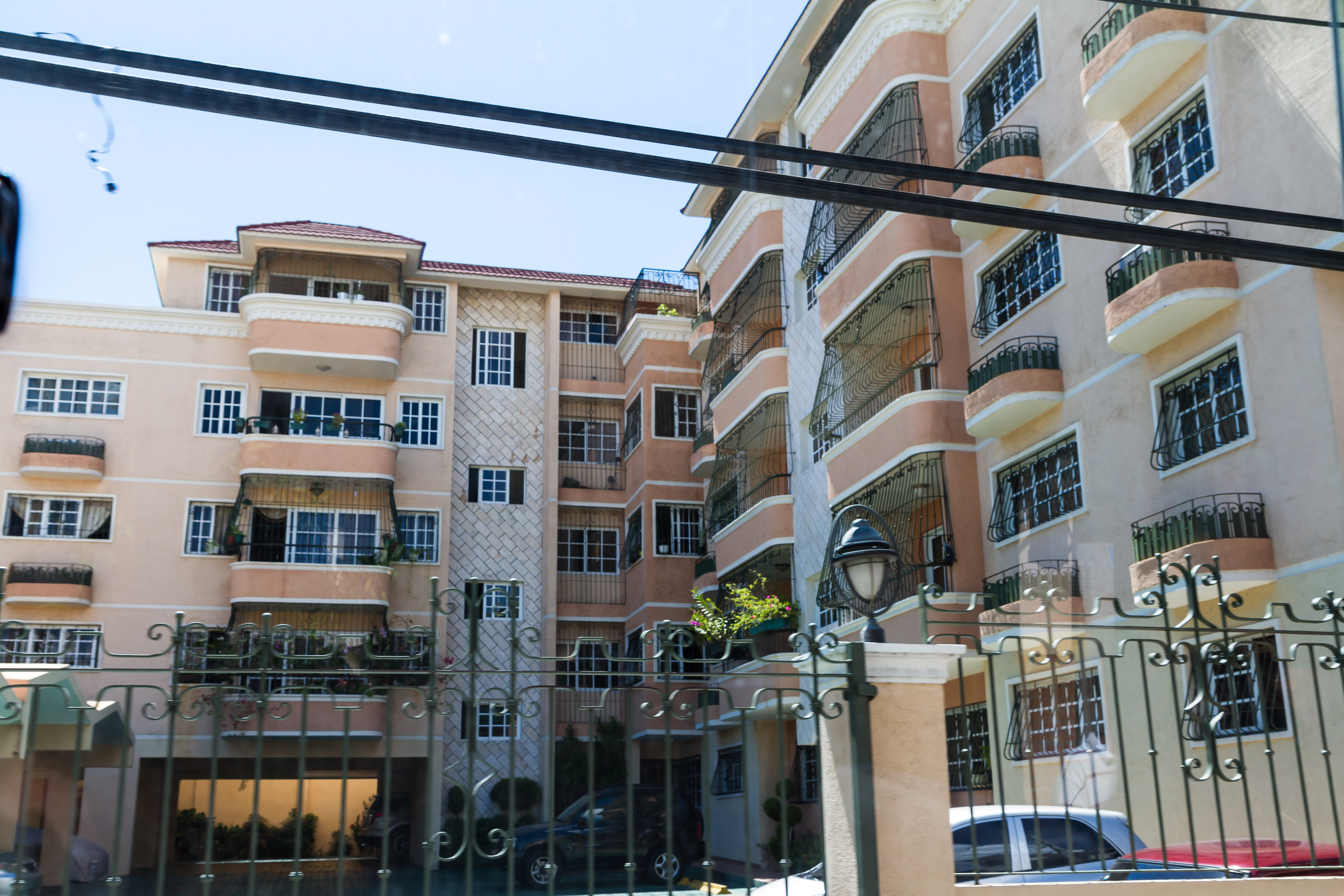
- Gascue neighborhood (2013)

- Location within the Dominican Republic
- Coordinates: 18°30′N 69°59′W
- Country: Dominican Republic
- Province: Distrito Nacional

Government
  - Mayor: Carolina Mejía (PRM)

Population (2022)
  - Total: 15,082
- Demonym: Spanish: Capitaleño (fem. Capitaleña)
- Time zone: UTC−04:00 (AST)
- Postal code: 10205
- Website: adn.gob.do (in Spanish)

Gascue is a Sector in the city of Santo Domingo in the Distrito Nacional of the Dominican Republic, one of the oldest of the city.

This borough is populated in particular by individuals from the upper middle class; however, it was originally an upper class neighborhood.
