= Villa Francisca =

- Location within the Dominican Republic
- Coordinates: 18°30′N 69°59′W
- Country: Dominican Republic
- Province: Distrito Nacional

Government
  - Mayor: Carolina Mejía

Population (2008)
  - Total: 50,185
- Demonym: capitaleño/capitaleña
- Time zone: UTC-4 UTC
  - Summer (DST): UTCNone
- Website: adn.gob.do (in Spanish)

Villa Francisca is a Sector in the city of Santo Domingo in the Distrito Nacional of the Dominican Republic. This neighborhood is populated in particular by individuals from the lower middle class.

In colonial times, Villa Francisca was then known as Galindo. In the literary work Cosas Añejas, by César Nicolás Penson, there is a mention to the case of the young virgin sisters that were brutally murdered in Galindo.

== Sources ==
- Distrito Nacional sectors
