= Villas Agricolas =

- Location within the Dominican Republic
- Country: Dominican Republic
- Province: Distrito Nacional
- Time zone: UTC-4 UTC
  - Summer (DST): UTCNone

Villas Agricolas is a sector in the city of Santo Domingo in the Distrito Nacional of the Dominican Republic.
