= Mirador Sur =

- Location within the Dominican Republic
- Coordinates: 18°30′N 69°59′W
- Country: Dominican Republic
- Province: Distrito Nacional

Government
  - Mayor: Carolina Mejía

Population (2008)
  - Total: 20,211
- Time zone: UTC-4 UTC
  - Summer (DST): UTCNone
- Website: adn.gob.do (in Spanish)

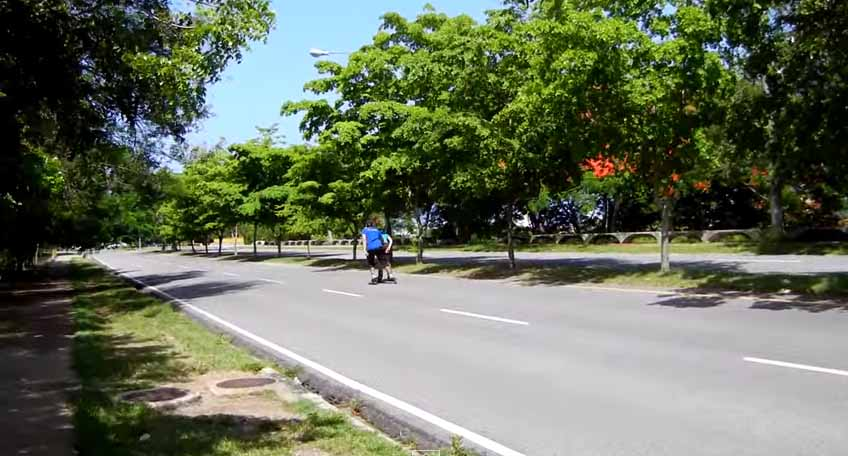
Mirador Sur Park - Santo Domingo

Mirador Sur (from Spanish 'South Vantage Point') is a sector or neighborhood in the city of Santo Domingo in the Distrito Nacional of the Dominican Republic. Mirador Sur is in particular populated by individuals from the upper and upper middle classes.

== Sources ==
- Distrito Nacional sectors
