= Dominican Workers' Party =

Dominican Workers' Party Partido de los Trabajadores Dominicanos
- Founded: 21 December 1980
- Dissolved: 17 December 2019
- Merger of: Red Line; Proletarian Flag
- Succeeded by: People's Force
- Ideology: Socialism
- Political position: Left-wing
- Continental affiliation: São Paulo Forum

Website
- www.ptd.org.do (out of order)

The Dominican Workers' Party (Spanish: Partido de los Trabajadores Dominicanos, PTD) was a socialist political party in the Dominican Republic founded in 1980. At its foundation, the party also supported Maoism, but later dropped references to it. The longest-serving leader and secretary general of the party was José González Espinosa, in office from the party's foundation until 2012. In the 16 May 2006 election, the party was a member of the winning Progressive Bloc.

In December 2019, the party was transformed into People's Force.

The party published a periodical, Liberación.
