= Ensanche Luperón =

- Location within the Dominican Republic
- Coordinates: 18°30′N 69°59′W
- Country: Dominican Republic

Government
  - Mayor: Carolina Mejía (PRM)

Population (2008)
  - Total: 8,576
- Demonym: capitaleño/capitaleña
- Time zone: UTC-4 UTC
  - Summer (DST): UTCNone
- Website: adn.gob.do (in Spanish)

Ensanche Luperón is a village in the Dominican Republic.
