= Piantini =

- Location within the Dominican Republic
- Coordinates: 18°30′N 69°59′W
- Country: Dominican Republic
- Province: Distrito Nacional

Government
  - Mayor: Carolina Mejía

Population (2008)
  - Total: 59,753
- Demonym: capitaleño/capitaleña
- Time zone: UTC-4 UTC
  - Summer (DST): UTCNone
- Website: adn.gob.do (in Spanish)

Ensanche Piantini is a district or neighborhood within the city of Santo Domingo in the National District of the Dominican Republic.

Piantini is in particular populated by individuals from the upper and upper middle class, and has the second most expensive price per m^{2} in the country, after Los Cacicazgos’ Anacaona Avenue.
