= Ensanche Naco =

Ensanche Naco El Naco
- Location within the Dominican Republic
- Coordinates: 18°28′31″N 69°55′36″W
- Country: Dominican Republic
- Province: Distrito Nacional

Government
  - Mayor: Carolina Mejía (PRM)

Population (2026)
  - Total: 11,106
- Demonym: capitaleño/capitaleña
- Time zone: UTC-4
- Website: adn.gob.do (in Spanish)

Ensanche Naco is a sector or neighborhood in the city of Santo Domingo in the Distrito Nacional of the Dominican Republic. This neighborhood is populated in particular by individuals from the upper middle class.

== Sources ==
- Distrito Nacional sectors
