= Miguel Adrover (footballer) =

Spanish footballer (1922–1945)

Personal information
- Full name: Miguel Adrover Torregrosa
- Date of birth: 25 April 1922
- Place of birth: Alicante, Spain
- Date of death: 26 June 1945 (aged 23)
- Place of death: Spain
- Position: Forward

Youth career
- 1934–1935: Arenas de San Blas
- 1935–1936: Alicante

Senior career*
Years	Team	Apps	(Gls)
1939–1942	Hércules		
1942–1945	Atlético Aviación		
- * Club domestic league appearances and goals

Miguel Adrover Torregrosa (25 April 1922 – 26 June 1945), was a Spanish footballer who played as a forward for Hércules and Atlético Madrid in the early 1940s.

== Early life and education ==
Miguel Adrover was born in the Alicante neighborhood of San Blas on 25 April 1922, as the son of Manuela Torregrosa and Catalino Adrover, a railway worker at Alicante-Término Station. He studied at the Salesian schools in the Ensanche of Alicante, where he developed a deep interest in football. Adrover played for the first team of Arenas de San Blas, where he excelled as a right-footed winger, so he was then signed by Alicante CF.

== Playing career ==
When the Spanish Civil War ended in 1939, the 17-year-old Adrover was signed by the top-flight team Hércules, then the best team in Alicante, making his debut in a league fixture against Espanyol, in which he scored in an eventual 3–3 draw. He quickly established himself as a key starter for the Hércules in the early postwar period, helping his side to stay in the top flight despite having a weak budget. He remained loyal to Hércules for three years, until 1942, when he had to move to the capital for military service, enlisting as a volunteer in the Air Force, where he quickly caught the attention of Atlético Aviación (now Atlético de Madrid); Hércules welcomed this transfer happily, as they had just been relegated to the Segunda División.

Adrover adapted to the capital quickly, becoming a starter under coach Ricardo Zamora, but in his first two seasons there, the club finished third and seventh in the league. In total, he scored 29 goals in 139 La Liga matches for Hércules and Aviación.

== Death ==
In May 1945, the 23-year-old Adrover, then in the best form of his career, sustained an illness that remains unclear, although some point to indigestion. He was eventually admitted to Madrid's Hospital del Rey for typhoid fever, which soon degenerated into a perforated intestine and led to his eventual death of peritonitis on 26 June 1945, at the young age of 23.

== Legacy ==
On the occasion of the 100th anniversary of Hércules in 2023, Adrover's name was among the 13 proposed by the association for the renaming of streets near the club's stadium.
