= Antònia Adroher i Pascual =

Spanish educationist and politician

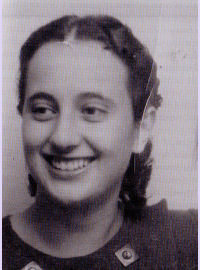

Personal details
- Born: June 22, 1915 Girona, Spain
- Died: September 7, 2007 (aged 92) Banyuls-sur-Mer, Spain
- Party: Workers' Party of Marxist Unification, Socialist Party of Catalonia Carmel Rosa Baserba
- Occupation: Teacher
- Profession: Human right activist Politician

Antònia Adroher i Pascual (22 June 1913 – 7 September 2007) was a Spanish teacher and political activist from Catalonia, Spain.

== Biography ==
Antònia studied teaching at the Normal School of Teachers of Girona while she was a member of the Spanish Federation of Education Workers (FETE) within the UGT.

She was one of the founders of the POUM and during the Spanish Civil War, she was the first woman to become Counselor for Culture and Propaganda at the Girona City Council.

On 21 October 1936 With this mandate, she set up, an education system using innovative and progressive educational practices based on "rationalist principles of work" and fraternity In practice, it organizes a public and free school for all providing education in Catalonia. and ensuring children's care and health, on the basis of hygienist principles, and equality for boys and girls through gender diversity.

In 1939, she was exiled in Toulouse then in Paris where she founded, with her husband Carmel Rosa Baserba, the Casal de Catalunya. she returned to Catalonia in 1977, two years after the end of Franco's dictatorship.

== Awards ==
Antonia won then prize Premi Mestres 68 for her achievements in renovation of the pedagogy in Catalonia.

Also in 2006, she received the Creu de Sant Jordi. In Girona, a public library (inaugurated in January 2008) and a street are named after Antònia Adroher.
