= Miguel Adrover (fashion designer) =

Spanish fashion designer

Miguel Adrover is a Spanish fashion designer born in Majorca in December 1965.

He moved to New York in 1995 and showed his first collection Manaus/Chiapas/NYC in 1999. He received the CFDA Best New Designer of the Year award in 2000.

== Biography ==
Miguel Adrover is an atypical designer in that he did not study fashion design but rather is self-taught. His career, both in Spain and in the United States, has been shaped by his friends and supporters. His innovative work, first presented in New York City's Lower East Side in 1999, met with immediate acclaim. However, his business effectively collapsed during the bursting of the bubble economy in 2001 when his major financial backer, the nascent U.S. conglomerate Pegasus Group, went bankrupt. He has since resurrected his business.

Born in the Balearic Islands, Adrover left school at the age of eleven to work on the family farm helping to harvest almonds. Within his creative imagination, the people of his town and his family—his parents, Miguel and María, and his brother Toni, a fisherman and a mechanic—play a very important role.

In July 2025, Adrover publicly refused to work with singer Rosalía due to her lack of public support for Palestine, calling for her to use her "power to denounce this genocide". Rosalía later responded by condemning the violence and "those who make decisions and have the power to act", also saying that "shaming each other is not the best way".
