= Dr. Rafael Ma. Moscoso National Botanical Garden =

Garden in Santo Domingo, Dominican Republic

Coordinates: 18°29′26″N 69°57′31″W

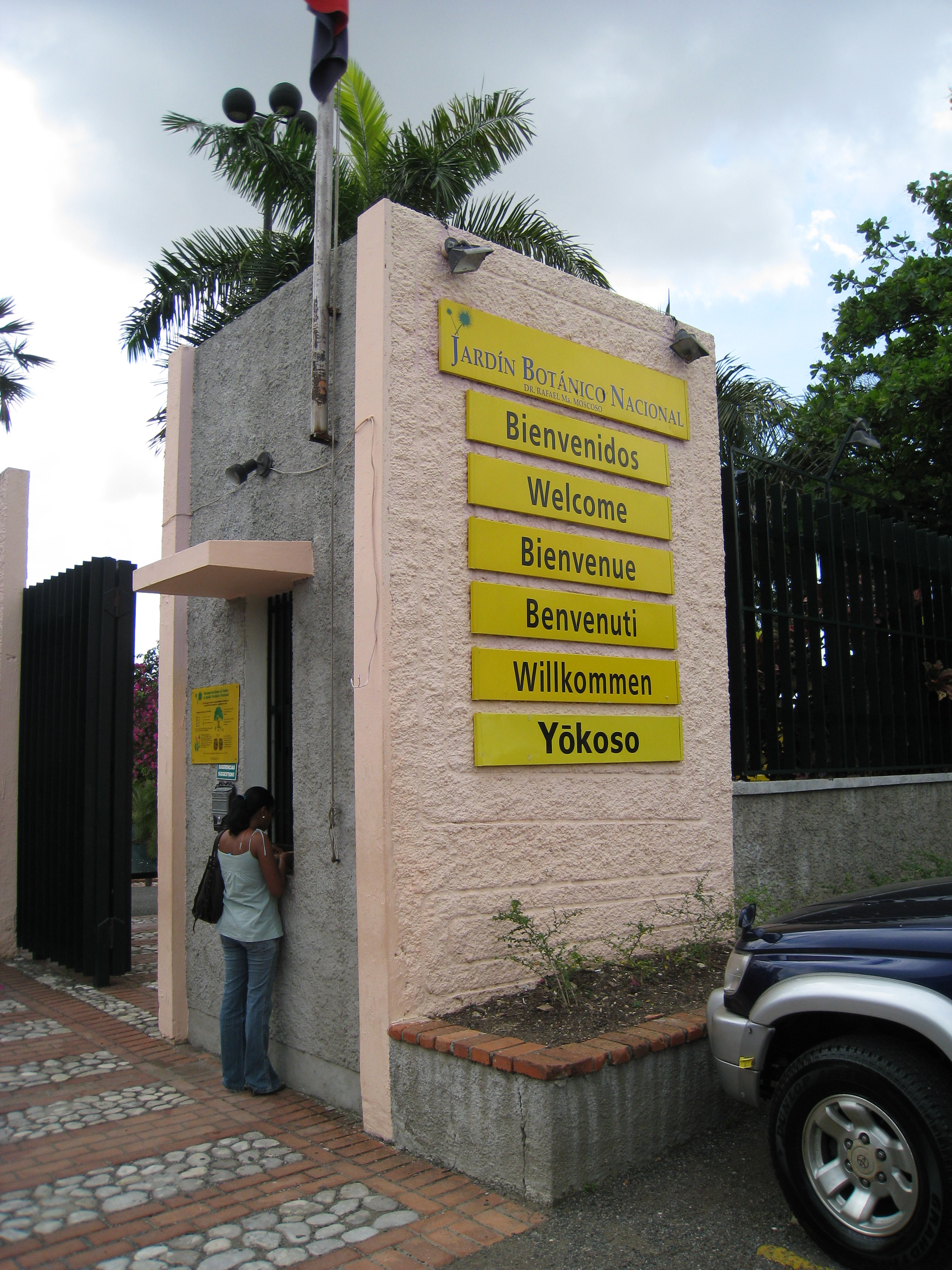
The main entrance to the garden.

Dr. Rafael Ma. Moscoso National Botanical Garden (Jardin Botanico Nacional Dr. Rafael Ma. Moscoso) is a botanical garden in the heart of Santo Domingo. The park was founded in 1976 and was named after Rafael Maria Moscoso, a Dominican botanist who cataloged the flora on the island of Hispaniola.

The garden's symbol is a "guanito" leaf (Coccothrinax argentea) which is a palm tree found in the garden. The garden is a decentralized institution that reports to the Dominican Republic's Presidential Ministry of Management.

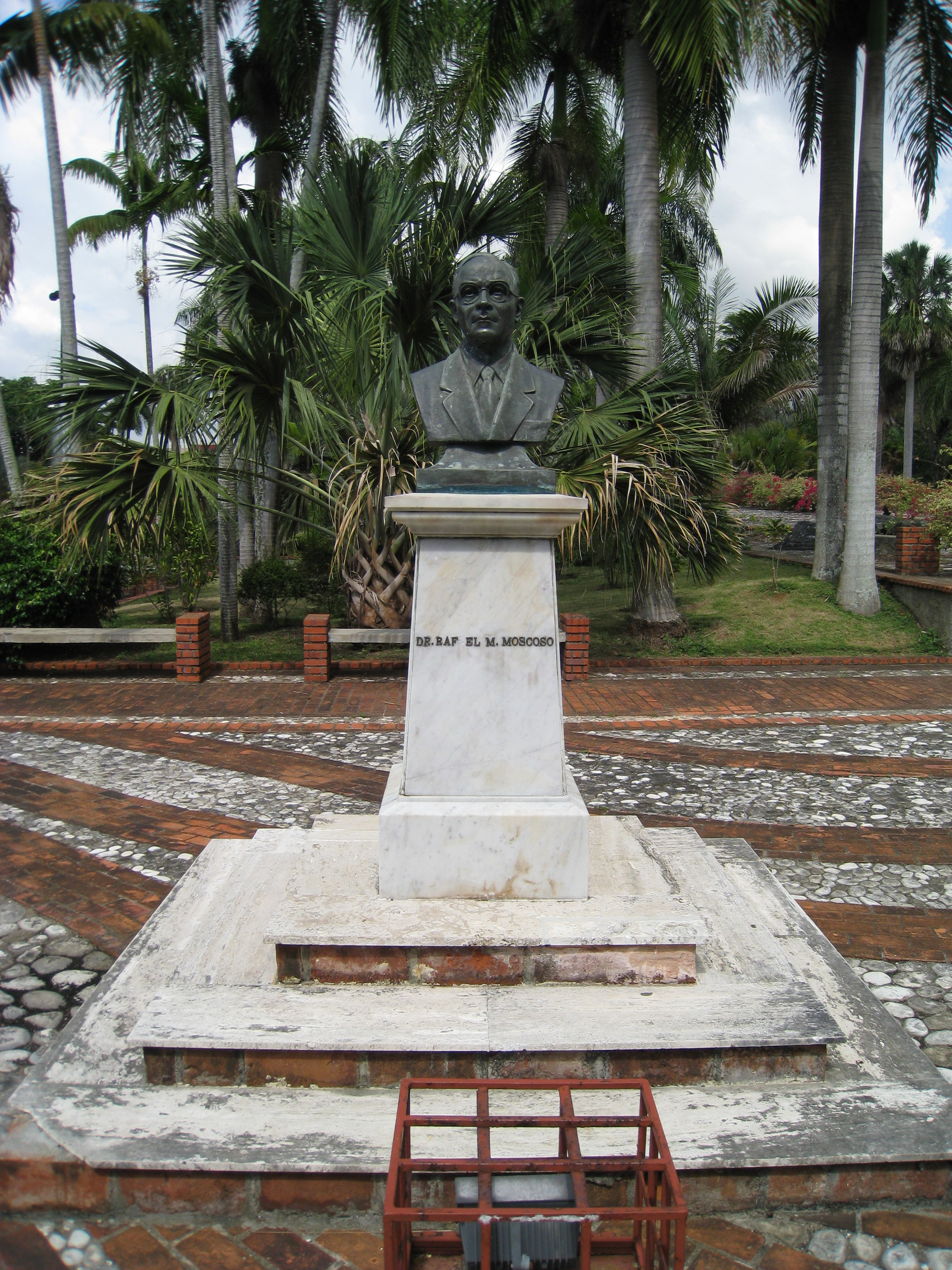
Bust of Dr. Rafael Ma. Moscoso in the park

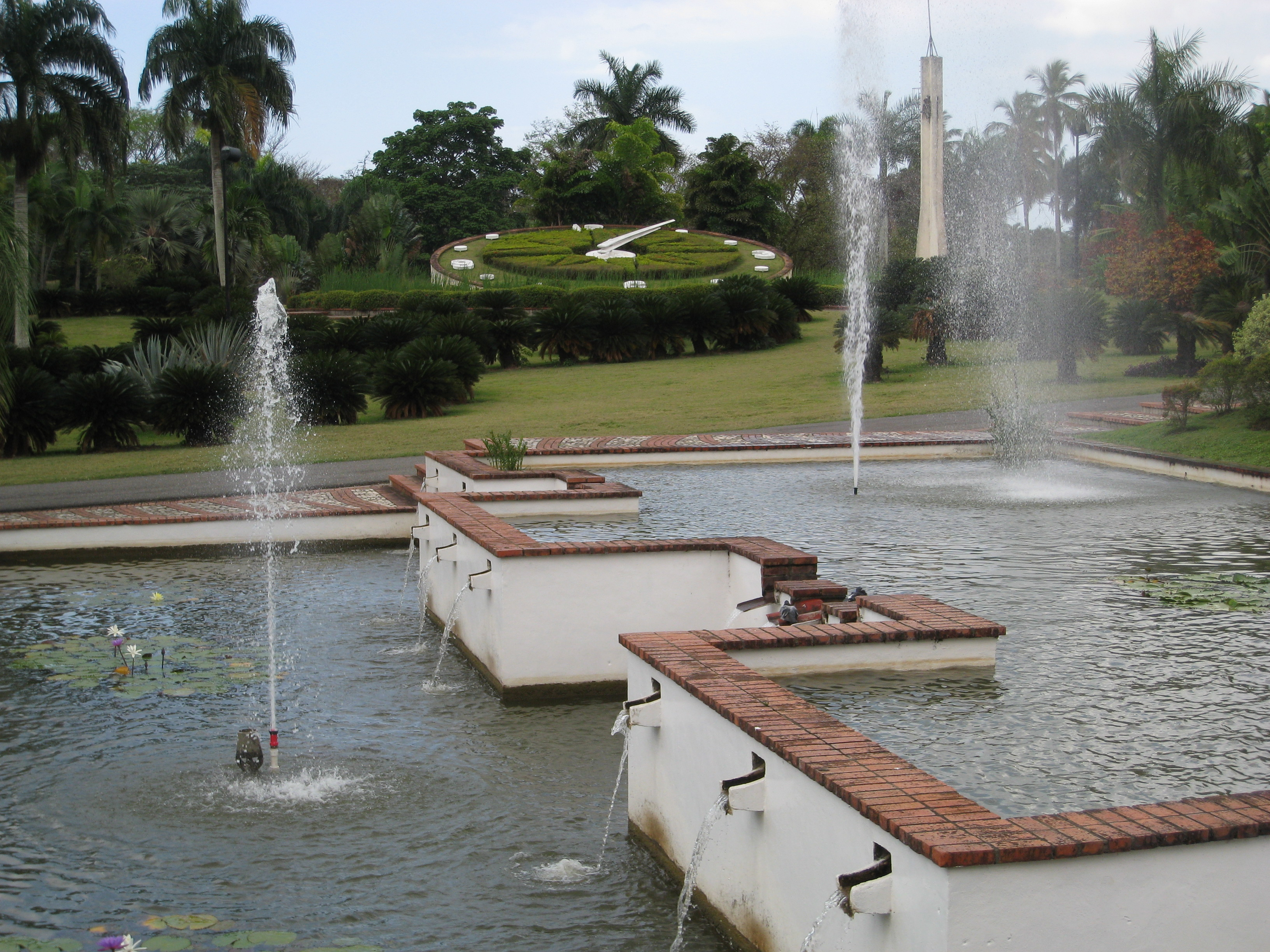
Floral Clock

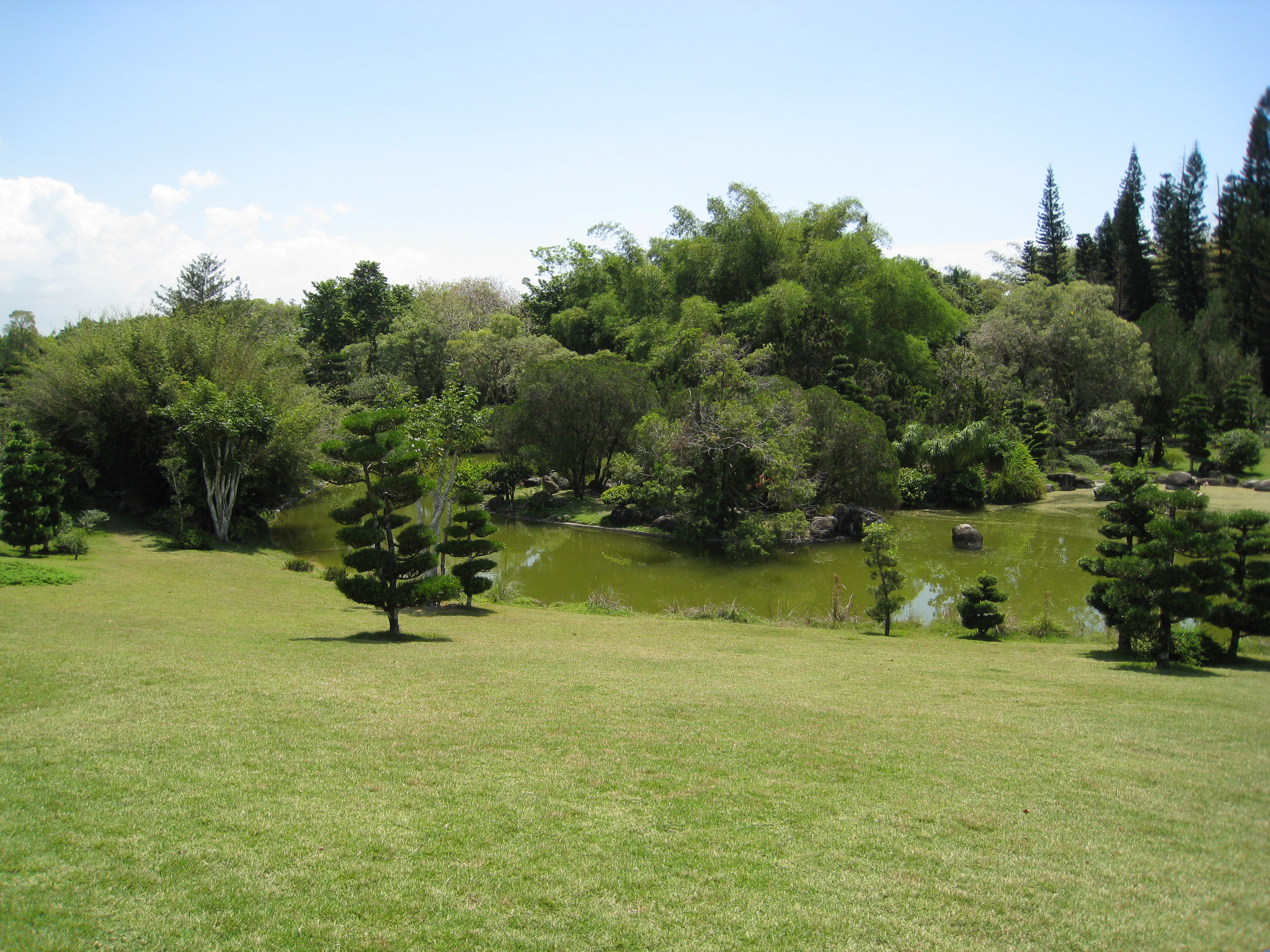
Japanese Garden

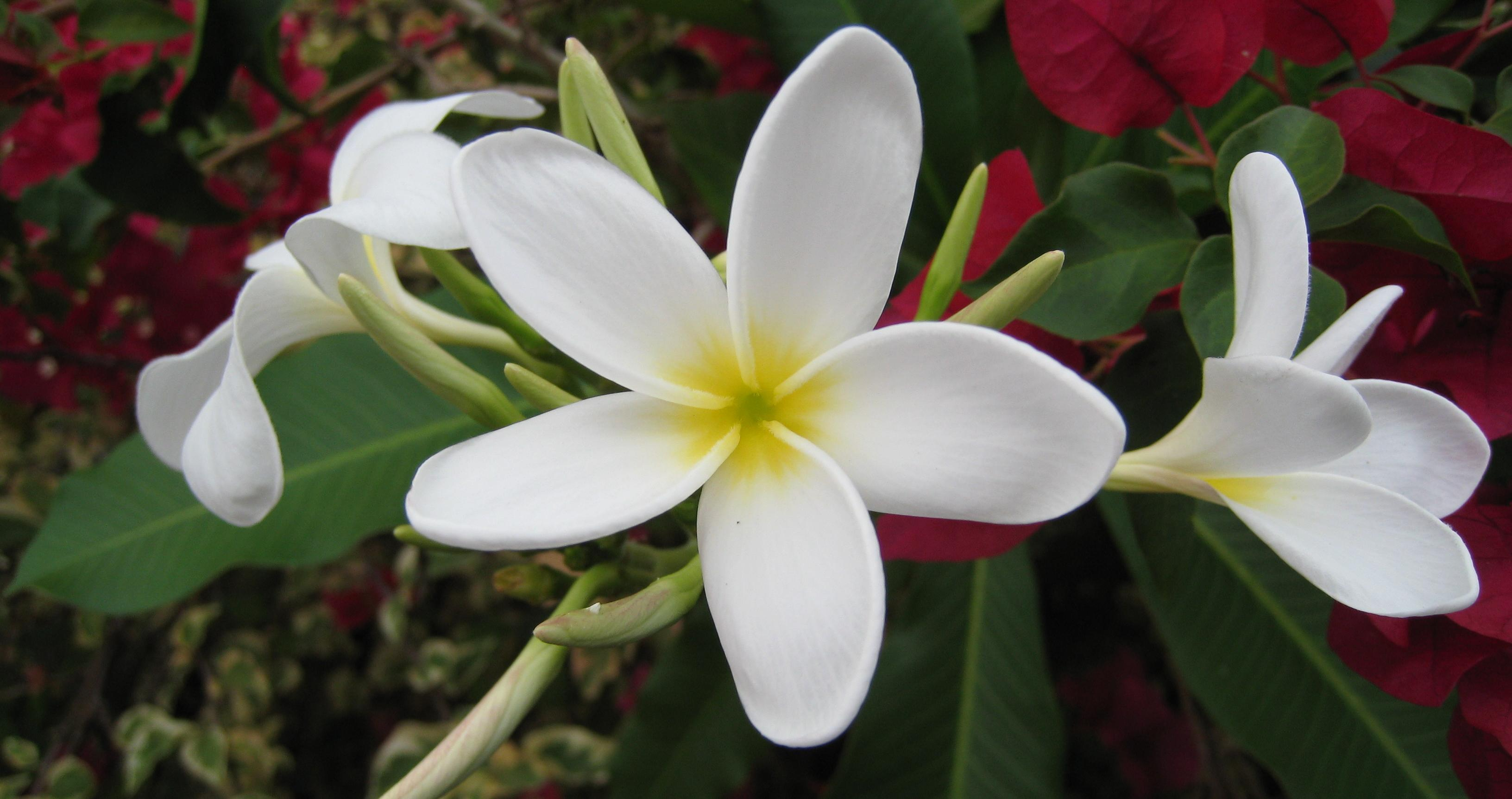
Plumeria Flower
