= People's Force =

People's Force Fuerza del Pueblo
- Abbreviation: FP
- President: Leonel Fernández
- Secretary-General: Antonio Florián
- Spokesperson: Eduard Alexis Espiritusanto Castillo (Senate); José David Báez Reinoso (Chamber of Deputies)
- Vice President: Radhamés Jiménez
- Founded: 17 October 2019
- Split from: Dominican Liberation Party
- Preceded by: Dominican Workers' Party
- Headquarters: Avenida Bolívar 101, esquina Calle Doctor Báez, Gascue, Distrito Nacional, 10205, Dominican Republic
- Membership (2023): 1,920,000
- Ideology: Progressivism
- Political position: Left-wing
- Regional affiliation: São Paulo Forum
- Colors: Green and white
- Chamber of Deputies: 28 / 190
- Senate: 3 / 32
- Mayors: 6 / 155
- Central American Parliament: 4 / 20

Website
- fuerzadelpueblo.org.do (in Spanish)

The People's Force (Spanish: Fuerza del Pueblo, FP) is a political party in the Dominican Republic led by former President Leonel Fernández.

Amid accusations of electoral fraud in the primary elections of October 2019, Leonel Fernández resigned from the presidency and militancy of the Dominican Liberation Party. Later, the already established Dominican Workers' Party welcomed him and agreed to change its name to People's Force and have Fernández as its presidential candidate, a change approved by the Central Electoral Board on 17 December of that year.

== History ==
=== Emergence ===
Leonel Fernández presented his pre-candidacy for the presidency of the Dominican Republic in early 2018 with the intention of competing within his party in the simultaneous primary elections of October 2019. During this process, he attacked his party partner and former president of the Dominican Republic, Danilo Medina, urging him to desist from seeking a third consecutive term and to avoid attempting to modify the constitution. This situation came to be seen in the National Congress but did not materialize given the political and social pressure that existed at that moment. The peak was reached when Leonel Fernández held a massive protest in front of the National Congress, manifesting an important division within the Dominican Liberation Party.

After President Danilo Medina gave up on seeking a third term and modifying the constitution, the Minister of Public Works and a close collaborator of Medina, Gonzalo Castillo, presented himself as a pre-candidate for the presidency with the backing of the incumbent president, which generated internal friction. Finally, Fernández was defeated by a narrow margin by Gonzalo Castillo, after which he called the electoral contest a "fraud". This was followed by several protests, televised addresses, and challenges to the Central Electoral Board, though Fernández never presented evidence or a formal complaint regarding his accusations.

Ultimately, this led Fernández to resign from the presidency and membership of the Dominican Liberation Party, where he had been a member for more than 46 years. Along with him, hundreds of members and dozens of public officials, including deputies and senators, resigned. However, Fernández called on followers who held elective office or had won primary candidacies in October 2019 to remain in their positions and not resign from the party, enabling them to form an opposition from within the organization.

=== Merger and name change ===
Originally, the political movement was called "The People's Force", matching the slogan Leonel Fernández used to rally his followers during the pre-electoral contest. Later, after the acquisition of the minority Dominican Workers' Party, the organization submitted a request to the Central Electoral Board to change its name to "People's Force", utilizing green branding and symbols alluding to vegetation and flowers. During a public hearing, the electoral board reviewed these changes, which faced opposition from various political parties and individuals regarding the name, colors, and symbols.

On 17 December, the JCE approved the name change of the Dominican Workers' Party to People's Force.

=== Exodus from the Dominican Liberation Party to People's Force ===
The People's Force has been strengthened mainly by the militants of the Dominican Liberation Party who continue to transfer to the new organisation, creating a scenario in which the two parties are vying for the title of second majority in the Senate.

== Electoral history ==
=== Presidential elections ===
Election	Candidate	First Round		Second Round		Result
Election	Candidate	Votes	%	Votes	%	Result
2020	Leonel Fernández	365,226	8.90%			Lost ✗
2024	Leonel Fernández	1,259,427	28,85%			Lost ✗
