= Alfredo Pacheco (politician) =

Dominican politician (born 1959)

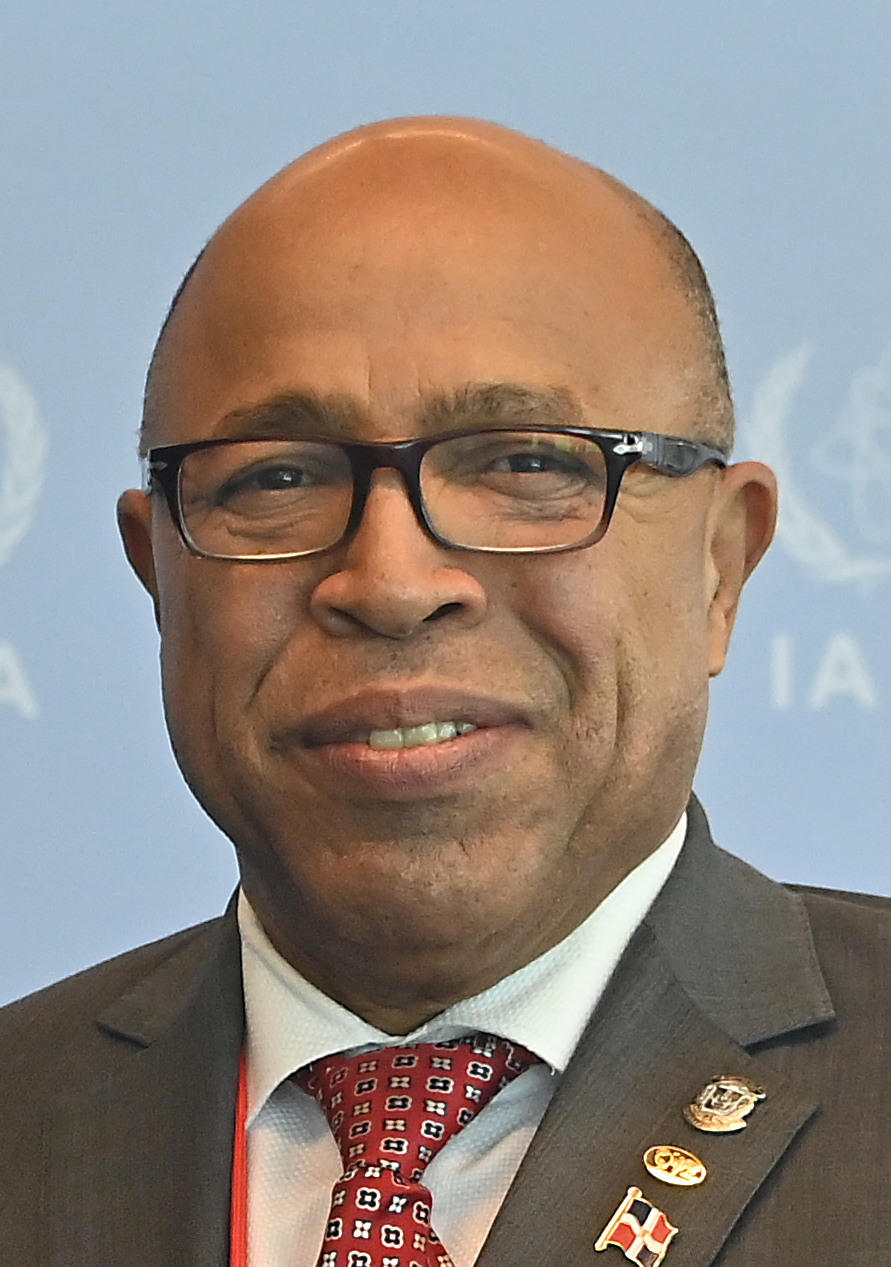
- Pacheco in 2021

Personal details
- Born: January 12, 1959 (age 67) Villa Juana, Santo Domingo, Dominican Republic
- Party: Modern Revolutionary Party (2014–present)
- Other political affiliations: Dominican Revolutionary Party (1977–2014)

Alfredo Pacheco Osoria (born 12 January 1959) is a Dominican Republic politician from the Modern Revolutionary Party who has been President of the Chamber of Deputies since 16 August 2020, and previously during 2003-2006.

== Political career ==
Alfredo Pacheco Osoria began to develop his political vocation at a very young age when he was barely 18 years old in 1977 and since then he has been actively affiliated with the Dominican Revolutionary Party (PRD).

He has held the position of councillor for the City Council of the National District during the period 1990-1994. He was a National Deputy in the period 1994-1998, 1998-2002 and 2002-2006. He also served as spokesperson for the Parliamentary Bloc of the Revolutionary Party in the periods 1997-2003.

With his election as a deputy, his voice never ceased to be heard in the National Congress, where he tenaciously defended bills that benefited Dominican connectivity and firmly confronted those projects harmful to the well-being and development of the Dominican nation.

In the congressional and municipal elections of 2002, Alfredo Pacheco was the deputy with the most votes in the National District. At the PRD convention he was the one who obtained the most votes to be elected as vice president of his party.

In 2003 he was elected with the support of all political parties represented in Congress as president of the Chamber of Deputies. From the moment he assumed that position, he has promoted numerous bills for the benefit of the country, as well as recognized highly deserving personalities in national life. His management was characterized by giving a notable positive turn to the image of the Legislative Branch and in particular the Chamber of Deputies.

=== Campaign for Mayor of the National District ===
In the elections of May 16, 2010, he was the PRD candidate for mayor of the National District for the municipal period (2010-2016), opposing Mayor Roberto Salcedo. He was defeated in the latter, although the leaders of his party attributed his defeat to the frauds led by his opponent.

=== His departure from the PRD 2015 and entry into the PRM ===
On June 10, 2015, he resigned from the PRD for not agreeing with the PLD-PRD alliance to reform the constitution and the creation of two new provinces. Then days later he was well received by the members of the PRM.

=== Odebrecht Scandal ===
Alfredo Pacheco was on the list of those implicated in the Odebrecht case in the Dominican Republic|Odebrecht case and the attorney general of the Republic, Jean Alain Rodríguez, requested the Dominican Supreme Court of Justice to remove the parliamentary immunity enjoyed by the deputy.

On the morning of May 29, 2017, the attorney general of the Republic, Jean Alain Rodríguez Sánchez, implicated 14 men - among them businessmen, politicians (including a minister) and a lawyer - of being part of the Odebrecht corruption scheme. Ten of the accused were immediately arrested; in addition, the Attorney General's Office requested INTERPOL to arrest the engineer and civil servant Bernardo Castellanos de Moya, who is in Panama. The Congress was also requested to lift the parliamentary immunity of two official senators and one opposition congressman. The Attorney General's Office requested before the Supreme Court of Justice a preventive coercive measure of 18 months.

On June 7, 2017, Special Instruction Judge Francisco Ortega Polanco ruled that the deputy would have to report periodically to the Public Prosecutor's Office as well as a bail of five million pesos and an impediment to leave the country due to his alleged involvement in the Odebrecth case.

On June 7, 2018, after a year and a half of investigation, in which audits and testimonies of Odebrecht executives were reviewed, Attorney General Jain Alain Rodríguez explained that no evidence was found to include Alfredo Pacheco and 7 other former officials in the case file. Prior to this, Alfredo Pacheco had explained that the Chamber of Deputies does not have constitutional powers to participate in bids, awards or signing of contracts for the construction of works. During his term as president of the Chamber of Deputies, three addenda pending from previous administrations for the construction of works with Odebrecht were approved.

== Studies ==
Alfredo Pacheco studied a Law Degree at the Universidad de la Tercera Edad. He has taken the following courses: Strengthening of Civil Society Organizations (INTEC); Public Management (UASD); Senior Management (Juan Montalvo Institute); Development of Social Projects (INTEC).

He has participated and has been a speaker in important seminars and international meetings among which are: Workshop Seminar on the General Telecommunications Law (Santo Domingo), Central American Conference of Political Parties (El Salvador), Regional Convention of the American Continent (Argentina), Seminar on Poverty and its new Challenges (Morocco), World Forum of Parliaments and Integration (Guatemala), among others.

== Personal life ==
Luis Alfredo Pacheco, son of the president of the Chamber of Deputies Alfredo Pacheco, was fatally shot in Houston, Texas, United States. The information was confirmed by Infodiario RD. The Houston Police Department has filed charges against a suspect for the murder that occurred on 1 April 2024.
