= Carolina Mejía =

Dominican politician (born 1969)

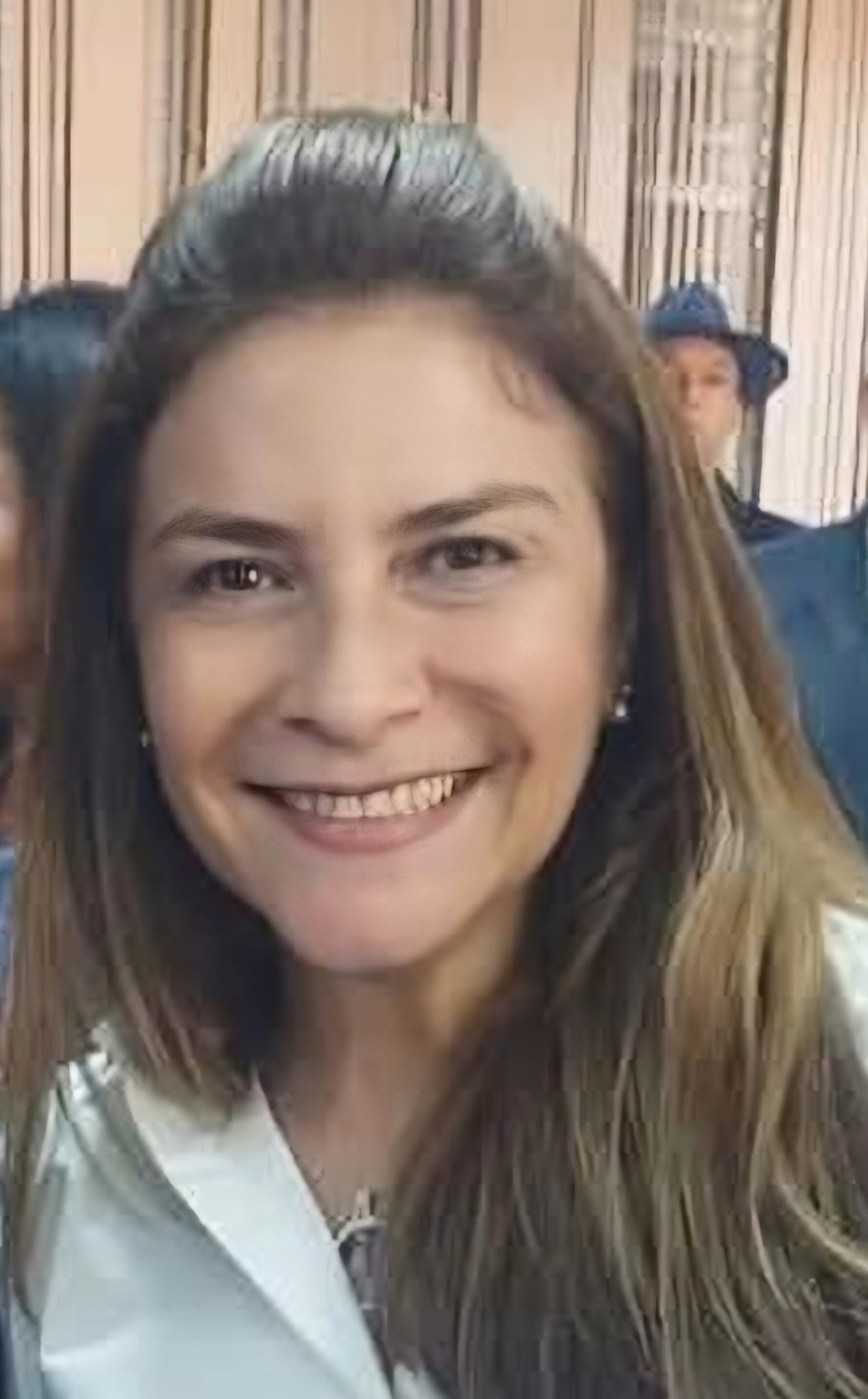
- Mejía en 2025

Mayor of Distrito Nacional
- Incumbent
- Assumed office 24 April 2020
- Vicemayor: Stalin Alcántara
- Preceded by: David Collado

Secretary-General of the Modern Revolutionary Party
- In office 14 June 2018 – 5 September 2026
- Chairman: José Ignacio Paliza
- Preceded by: Jesús "Chu" Vásquez Martínez
- Succeeded by: Juan Garrigó Mejía

Alternate member of the board of directors of the Central Bank of the Dominican Republic
- In office 2003–2004
- President: José Luis Malkún

Personal details
- Born: 28 March 1969 (age 57) Santiago de los Caballeros, Dominican Republic
- Party: Modern Revolutionary Party
- Spouse: Juan Antonio Garrigó Lefeld
- Children: Juan de Jesús; Diego José; Isabel Carolina
- Parents: Hipólito Mejía (father); Rosa Gómez (mother)
- Occupation: Politician; businesswoman
- Profession: Economist
- Website: Mayor's office website (in Spanish)

Rosa Carolina Mejía Gómez de Garrigó (born 28 March 1969) is a Dominican politician, economist, and businesswoman. She became mayor of Distrito Nacional in 2020, the first woman to assume the position.

== Early life ==
Rosa Carolina Mejía Gómez was born in Santiago de los Caballeros on 28 March 1969 to Hipólito Mejía, agronomist and President of the Dominican Republic from 2000 to 2004, and Rosa Gómez Arias, the former First Lady of the Dominican Republic. Carolina has 2 brothers and 1 sister.

== Personal life ==
She married Juan Antonio Garrigó Lefeld, insurance and brokerage businessman of Catalan and German descent and they had three children, Juan de Jesús, Diego José, and Isabel Carolina Garrigó Mejía.

== Political life ==
In the early 2000s she was a member of the board of the Central Bank of the Dominican Republic. In 2016 she became the vice presidential candidate of the Modern Revolutionary Party.

Mejía de Garrigó was elected General Secretary of her party in the primary elections held on 18 March 2018, and took office on 14 June 2018.

On 24 April 2020, Mejía took office as mayor of Santo Domingo, becoming the first woman to lead the Dominican Republic capital city; she was re-elected on 18 February 2024.
