= Juan Garrigó Mejía =

Dominican Republic politician (born 1994)

3rd Secretary-General of the Modern Revolutionary Party
- Incumbent
- Assumed office 5 September 2026
- Chairman: Luis Abinader
- Preceded by: Carolina Mejía

Deputy Minister for Administrative Affairs of the Presidency of the Dominican Republic
- In office 16 August 2020 – 7 September 2026
- President: Luis Abinader
- Minister: José Ignacio Paliza (2020–2024); Andrés Bautista (2024–2026)
- Succeeded by: Escarlyn Yakaira "Scarlet" Benzán

Personal details
- Born: Juan de Jesús Garrigó Mejía; 27 December 1994 (age 31) Santo Domingo, Dominican Republic
- Party: Modern Revolutionary Party
- Spouse: Isabella Staffeld (m. 2025)
- Children: 1
- Parents: Juan Garrigó Lefeld (father); Carolina Mejía (mother)
- Relatives: List: Hipólito Mejía (grandfather); Rosa Gómez (grandmother); Winston Llenas (double second cousin-twice removed); Juan Isidro Jimenes Grullón (double second cousin-twice removed); José Rafael Llenas Aybar (double third cousin); Ana Elisa Villanueva (triple third cousin-twice removed)
- Education: Georgetown University; American University
- Ethnicity: White Dominican

Juan de Jesús Garrigó Mejía (born 27 December 1994) is a Dominican politician and economist.

== Early life and family ==
Garrigó Mejía was born on 27 December 1994 into a prominent upper class white family from Santiago, Dominican Republic with political connections. His parents are Carolina Mejía, mayor of Santo Domingo, and Juan Antonio Garrigó Lefeld, insurance and brokerage businessman. The eldest of his siblings, he has 1 brother and 1 sister. He is the fifth generation of men in his family to be named Juan, the first being his Puerto Rican great-great-grandfather, Juan Garrigó y Ferrer. His paternal grandmother, Sonja Lefeld, is a socialite, former TV personality, and the daughter of a German immigrant. His maternal grandfather Hipólito Mejía was President of the Dominican Republic from 2000 to 2004.

Garrigó Mejía studied political sciences and economics at the American University in Washington, D.C.; he has a postgraduate degree from Barna Management School and Georgetown University.

== Political career ==
On 16 August 2020 President Luis Abinader designated Garrigó Mejía as Deputy Minister for Administrative Affairs of the Presidency. In 2026 he was elected Secretary-General of the Modern Revolutionary Party.

Garrigó resigned from his position as deputy minister on 3 September 2026; his resignation became effective on 7 September when his successor was appointed.

== Ancestry ==
Family tree of Juan Garrigó

8. Juan Garrigó Rodríguez (1904-1986); b. Yauco, Puerto Rico
4. Juan Francisco José Garrigó Matos (born 1939); b. Barahona, Dominican Republic
9. Antonia Matos y Matos; b. Barahona, Dominican Republic
2. Juan Antonio Garrigó Lefeld (born 1968); Santo Domingo, Dominican Republic
10. Erwin Albert Lefeld (1905–?); Hamburg, Germany
5. Sonja Mercedes María Lefeld Saleta (born 1938); Santiago, Dominican Republic
11. Mercedes María Saleta Llenas (1911–2005); Santiago, Dominican Republic
1. Juan de Jesús Garrigó Mejía (born 1994); Santo Domingo, Dominican Republic
12. Hipólito de Jesús ‘Polín’ Mejía Díaz (1906–1996); Gurabo, Dominican Republic
6. Rafael Hipólito Mejía Domínguez (born 1941); Santiago, Dominican Republic
13. María Josefa ‘Marina’ Domínguez Viñals (1915-1994); Gurabo, Dominican Republic
3. Rosa Carolina Mejía Gómez (born 1969); Santiago, Dominican Republic
14. Octavio Ramón Antonio Gómez Domínguez (1899–1971); Gurabo, Dominican Republic
7. Rosa Gómez Arias (1944–2022); Gurabo, Dominican Republic
15. Gregoria Leocadia Arias Gómez (1913–1990); Gurabo, Dominican Republic
