= Miguel Cocco =

Dominican politician (1946–2009)

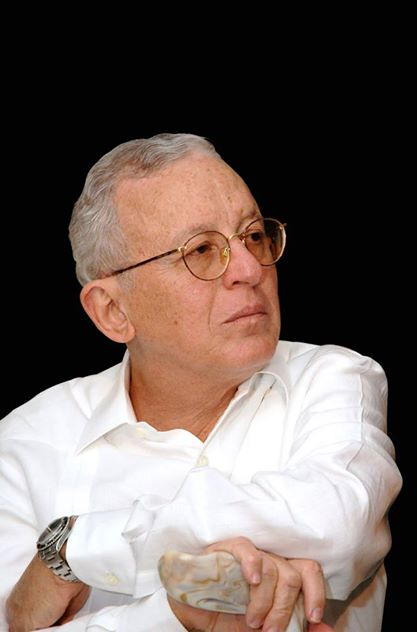
- Joaquín Balaguer, Leonel Fernández, Temístocles Montás, and Miguel Cocco

General Director of Customs of the Dominican Republic
- In office 16 August 2004 – 26 May 2009
- President: Leonel Fernández
- Preceded by: Vicente Sánchez Baret
- Succeeded by: Rafael Camilo
- In office 16 August 1996 – 16 August 2000
- President: Leonel Fernández
- Succeeded by: Vicente Sánchez Baret

Personal details
- Born: 21 August 1946 Santiago de los Caballeros, Santiago, Dominican Republic
- Died: 20 May 2009 (aged 62) Santo Domingo, Distrito Nacional
- Citizenship: Dominican
- Party: Partido de la Liberación Dominicana (PLD)
- Spouse: Aura Minerva González Tabar
- Children: 4
- Education: Universidad Autónoma de Santo Domingo
- Profession: Sociólogo

Miguel Salvador Cocco Guerrero (August 21, 1946 – May 20, 2009) was a Dominican businessman and politician.

Born in Santiago; his parents Manuel A. Cocco and Gisela Guerrero moved with him to Santo Domingo when he was at an early age. He began his studies at La Salle Catholic College in 1956, where from an early age he excelled as student academic laurels meritorio. Cocco graduated with academic laurels with a degree in sociology from the Faculty of Economics and Social Sciences of the Autonomous University of Santo Domingo (UASD), Cocco, then worked at the institution as a teacher and researcher, where he co-founded the Center for the Study of Dominican Social Reality (CERESD).

Ancestors of Miguel Cocco

16. Tomás de Cocco Díaz Bustamante (1805–1863)
8. Manuel Antonio Cocco Alum (1854–1931)
17. Dolores Alum (1818–1873)
4. Salvador Augusto Cocco Pastoriza (1892–1995)
18. Andrés Pastoriza Hafsell
9. Catalina ‘Catrina’ Pastoriza Ureña (1857–1947)
19. Eulogia Ureña Castillo
2. Manuel Augusto Cocco Batlle (1918–)
20. Jaime Batlle Amat
10. José Joaquín Batlle Filbá (1844–1899)
21. Rosa Filbá Villardell
5. María del Carmen Batlle Espaillat (1890–1971)
22. Ulises Francisco Espaillat Quiñones (1823–1878)
11. María Dolores ‘Lola’ Espaillat Espaillat (1853–1936)
23. Eloísa Espaillat Rodríguez (1818–1919)
1. Miguel Salvador Cocco Guerrero (1946–2009)
6. Miguel Ángel Guerrero
3. Gisela Guerrero Dujarric (1928–)
28. Luis Jerónimo Dujarric López (1828–?)
14. Pedro Antonio Dujarric Perdomo (1856–?)
29. María Dolores Perdomo Luna (1810–1880)
7. María Dujarric Quesada (1896–?)
30. José Dolores Quezada Castro
15. Altagracia Inés Quesada Chaves (1862–?)
31. Rosalía Chaves
