= Franciscan University =

Franciscan University may refer to:

- Franciscan University of Steubenville
- Universidade Franciscana
- University of Arizona Global Campus
- Universidad Francisco Marroquín
- Francisco de Vitoria University
- Francisco de Paula Santander University
- Universidad Federico Henríquez y Carvajal
- Francisco Gavidia University

== See also ==
- Franciscan University murders
