= José Santana (economist) =

Dominican economist

José Manuel Santana Silvestre
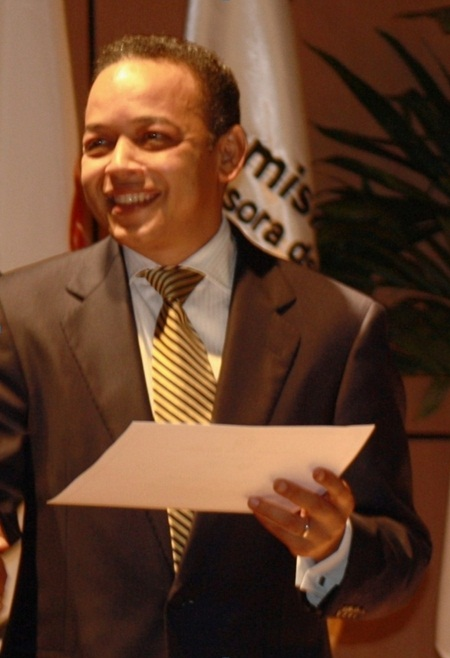
- Born: April 5, 1962 (age 64); Santo Domingo, Dominican Republic
- Occupations: Ambassador, executive director
- Spouse: Euridicis Romero de Santana
- Children: 5
- Website: www.ciact.gov.do

José Manuel Santana Silvestre (born 5 April 1962) is a Dominican economist, specialist in Technology and Development. He is the executive director of the Dominican Republic International Commission of Science & Technology (CIACT in Spanish) with the rank of ambassador. He is also a Research Affiliate at the Massachusetts Institute of Technology in the Department of Linguistics and Philosophy.

== Biography ==
=== Studies ===
Santana attended local high schools in the Dominican Republic and Costa Rica including Calasanz and Vargas Calvo, as well as the University of Costa Rica. Because of his youth background during his formative years Santana identified with the Central American social activist movement where he joined the opposition against the Somoza dictatorship. He helps as a humanitarian volunteer in the efforts to rebuild Nicaragua and in the nationwide literacy campaign. In 1984 Santana moved back to the Dominican Republic to finish his bachelor's in economics at the Santo Domingo Institute of Technology.

=== Career ===
From 1999 to 2001, Santana attended the Executive Information Technology Management program at Columbia University in New York City. Since 2003 he became a Research Affiliate at MIT, first at the RFID-Lab, developing project in Latin America with Radio Frequency Identification Technology in Supply Chain Management. In 2005 he joined the Media Lab, helping in the One Laptop Per Child (OLPC) initiative, launched by Nicholas Negroponte and in 2007 at the Department of Linguistic and Philosophy with Professor Noam Chomsky.

In September 2004, Dominican president Leonel Fernández appointed Santana to the role of executive director of the International Commission of Science and Technology. Since then he has worked and/or developed very important initiative in Science, Technology and Education, among them:

Open Knowledge (OCW for the Dominican Republic) - Cambiando el Mundo 1 A 1 - One Laptop Per Child - Open Learning Exchange - My Trip to NASA Science Fair - New York Task Force Global Foundation for Democracy and Development - Young Peoples Chorus for the Dominican Republic - Cachote Scientific Research Station (Barahona) - Potential Inclusion Kyoto's Protocol Clean Development Mechanism - Environmental and Renewable Energy Consortium Pro Sustainable America -

He has lectured about Technology, Development and Education in many different institutions, such as Harvard University, Yale University, MIT, The International Computer Learning Conference in Austria, GS1-Chile, Italy, Venezuela and University of Ilmenau in Germany.

== See also ==
- International Commission of Science and Technology
