= ICST =

ICST may refer to:

- Information and Communication Science and Technology Department, at École nationale supérieure de techniques avancées Bretagne, France
- International Center for the Study of Terrorism at Pennsylvania State University, U.S.
- International Commission of Science and Technology, Dominican Republic
- Institute for Computer Sciences, Social Informatics and Telecommunications Engineering, a non-profit professional association
