= Rosa Gómez de Mejía =

Former first lady of the Dominican Republic (1940–2022)

Rosa Gómez

52nd First Lady of the Dominican Republic
- In role 16 August 2000 – 16 August 2004
- President: Hipólito Mejía
- Preceded by: Asela Mera de Jorge (1986); Vacant (1986–2000)
- Succeeded by: Margarita Cedeño

Personal details
- Born: Rosa Altagracia Eulogia Gómez Arias; 11 March 1940 Gurabo, Santiago Province, Dominican Republic
- Died: 21 March 2022 (aged 82) Santo Domingo, Dominican Republic
- Spouse: Hipólito Mejía (m. 1964)
- Children: Ramón Hipólito; Rafael Hipólito Felipe; Rosa Carolina; Lissa Rosina
- Education: Universidad Autónoma de Santo Domingo

External image
- Image of Rosa Gómez hosted on rnn.com.do

Rosa Altagracia Eulogia Gómez Arias de Mejía (11 March 1940 – 21 March 2022) was a Dominican socialite who was the First Lady of the Dominican Republic from 2000 until 2004 and the wife of President Hipólito Mejía.

Gómez was the first woman to head the official government Office of the First Lady, which was created by Decree 741-00 on 10 September 2000, less than a month after she assumed the position. She focused on education, social initiatives, and cultural issues during her four year tenure.

== Biography ==
Rosa Gómez Arias was born in Gurabo, Santiago Province. She studied education at the Universidad Autónoma de Santo Domingo. Gómez married Hipólito Mejía on 4 July 1964. The couple had four children: Ramón, Felipe, Carolina, and Lissa. Their daughter Carolina Mejía de Garrigó was a candidate for vice president of the Dominican Republic in 2016 and became mayor of the Distrito Nacional (Santo Domingo) in 2020.

Gómez de Mejía became First Lady of the Dominican Republic on 16 August 2000, with the inauguration of her husband, Hipólito Mejía. Gómez was the country's first new First Lady since Asela Mera de Jorge left the office in 1986. From 1986 until 2000, the Presidents of the Dominican Republic were either unmarried (Joaquín Balaguer) or divorced at the time (Leonel Fernández).

The official, government Office of the First Lady was created by Decree 741 of 10 September 2000. Rosa Gómez de Mejía became the first First Lady to head and coordinate the new government office from September 2000 until she left the position in 2004.

As first lady, Gómez helped to conceive and establish El Museo Infantil Trampolín (The Trampoline Children's Museum), a children's museum and nonprofit focused on introducing Dominican children to new educational and cultural experiences. The museum, which opened on 30 April 2004, is housed in the Casa de Bastidas, the 15th century home of Rodrigo de Bastidas, in Santo Domingo's Ciudad Colonial neighborhood. The museum's exhibition rooms include science rooms and an open-air theater. Approximately 90,000 children visit the institution annually.

Rosa Gómez de Mejía died on 21 March 2022. She suffered a heart attack prior to her death.

== Honors ==
- Spanish Dame Grand Cross of the Order of Isabella the Catholic in 2000
