= Gurabo =

Gurabo may refer to:

- Gurabo, Dominican Republic
- Gurabo, Puerto Rico
