= Andrés Bautista =

Dominican politician (born 1964)

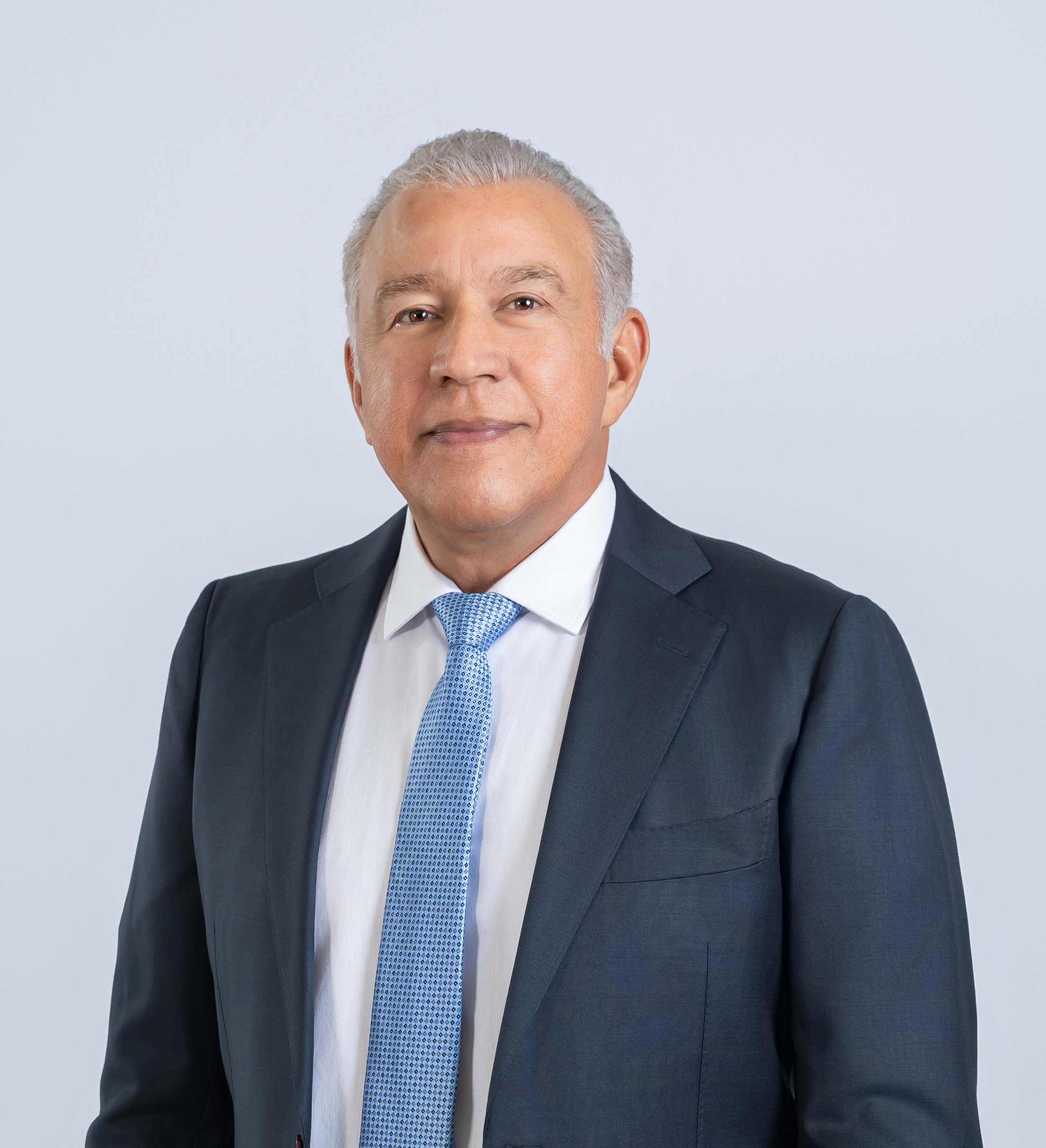

Minister for Administrative Affairs of the Presidency (Chief of Staff)
- Incumbent
- Assumed office August 16, 2024
- President: Luis Abinader
- Preceded by: José Ignacio Paliza
- Deputy ministers: Dilia Leticia Jorge-Mera (until Jan. 2025); Juan Garrigó (until Sep. 2026); José Gabriel Jáquez; Osval Antonio Saldívar; Scarlet Benzán (from Sep. 2026)

President of the Senate of the Dominican Republic
- In office August 16, 2001 – August 16, 2003
- Preceded by: Ramón Alburquerque Ramírez (1998–2001)
- Succeeded by: Jesús "Chú" Vásquez (2003–2004)
- In office August 16, 2004 – August 16, 2006
- Preceded by: Jesús (Chú) Vásquez (2003–2004)
- Succeeded by: Reinaldo Pared Pérez (2006–2014)

Dominican Republic Senator for Espaillat Province
- In office August 16, 2001 – August 16, 2010
- Succeeded by: Jose Rafael Vargas

1st Chairman of the Modern Revolutionary Party
- In office 2014–2018
- Succeeded by: Jose Ignacio Paliza

Personal details
- Born: Porfirio Andrés Bautista García Moca, Dominican Republic
- Party: Modern Revolutionary Party (2014–present)
- Spouse: Nuris del Carmen Taveras
- Children: 3
- Parent(s): Juan Andrés Avelino Bautista, Lucía García
- Education: Pontifical Catholic University Mother and Teacher (PUCMM)
- Occupation: Politician, agricultural producer, businessman

Porfirio Andrés Bautista García (Santo Domingo, 1964) is a politician, lawyer and agricultural producer from the Dominican Republic. He was president of the Modern Revolutionary Party (PRM) from 2014 to 2018, and senator for the Espaillat Province of the Dominican Republic for four terms from 1994 to 2010. Bautista also served as president of the Senate of the Dominican Republic in 2001-2003 and 2004-2006.

== Background ==
Bautista García was born and raised in Moca (Dominican Republic). He graduated with a law degree from the Pontificia Universidad Católica Madre y Maestra in Santiago (Dominican Republic) and received two honorary doctorates from the academic institutions of the Universidad Tecnológica de Santiago (UTESA) and the Universidad Federico Henríquez y Carvajal (UFHEC).

In 1977, he married Nuris del Carmen Taveras and they procreated three children: Emmanuel, Susanna and Lawrence Bautista Taveras. Their son Enmmanuel Bautista was deputy for the province of Espaillat in 2010 and is currently Secretary General of the Dominican Revolutionary Party (PRD) of the Municipality of Moca and has held the position of Consul General of the Dominican Republic in Haiti since August 2020.

== Career in the agricultural industry ==
Bautista García started as an agronomist in the Secretariat of Agriculture (today Ministry of Agriculture of the Dominican Republic) and started his first poultry farm with the help of his father (Don Chacho) in the community of Zanjón, Salcedo. Over the past 50 years, the company has become one of the largest producers of agricultural products in the country.

In 1973, Bautista García founded Cooperativa Avícola Nacional, where he also served as general manager. He was founder and director of Cooperativa Nacional de Productores Porcinos (COONAPROCE). He is also a member of several agricultural organizations, including the Asociación de Productores Agrícolas de la Provincia de Espaillat INC (APAPE), Productores Agrícolas Unidos (PRO-AUNI), Asociación para el Desarrollo de la Provincia de Espaillat (ADEPE) and the Junta de Agroempresarial Dominicana (JAD).

== Politics ==
Bautista García represented the province of Espaillat in the Senate of the Dominican Republic for four terms, in 1994-1998, 1998-2002, 2002–2006 and 2006-2010. He also served as President of the Senate, the Upper House of the Congress of the Dominican Republic, from 2001-2003 and 2005-2006.

=== Political affiliations ===
- Member of the National Council of the Magistracy.
- President of the Permanent Commission of Industry and Commerce of the Senate of the Dominican Republic.
- President of the Dominican Revolutionary Party in the Chapter House of Moca, 1982-1986.
- Secretary of Organization of the Dominican Revolutionary Party in Moca, province of Espaillat.
- President of the Provincial Committee of the Dominican Revolutionary Party from 1991 to date.

== Odebrecht Case ==
According to several sources, Porfirio Andrés Bautista García was involved in the Odebrecht Case, an investigation by the Dominican Public Prosecutor's Office of Odebrecht, a Brazilian construction company's activity related to bribery of the country's top government officials. As the source notes, 14 people were indicted with bribery or money laundering, including Bautista Garcia, who was arrested in his office by the Swat Team of the National Police on May 29, 2017. However, Bautista García denied the allegations and claimed that the charges against him were made for a "political motivation.” In March 2018, Bautista García left his position as president of the Modern Revolutionary Party.

On October 14, 2021 the Collegiate Court of the National District of the Dominican Republic, pronounced Andrés Bautista not guilty in all accounts, including bribery, falsehood, prevarication, money laundering and illicit enrichment.

The court, composed of magistrates Tanía Yunes, Giselle Méndez and Jisell Naranjo, determined that the facts for which the Public Prosecutor's Office accused Bautista did not exist. The court pointed out that "Bautista was not the president of the Senate at the time the contracts in favor of the Brazilian capital company were approved."

In relation to the case, on September 23, 2020, Bautista filed a lawsuit against the former Attorney General of the Republic, Jean Alain Rodríguez, for 500 million pesos for moral and material damages.

== Net worth ==
In 2024, Bautista declared in an affidavit that his net worth stands at RD$ 239 million (US$ 4 million).
