= Park Soo-gil =

South Korean diplomat

Ambassador Park Soo-gil
- 박수길
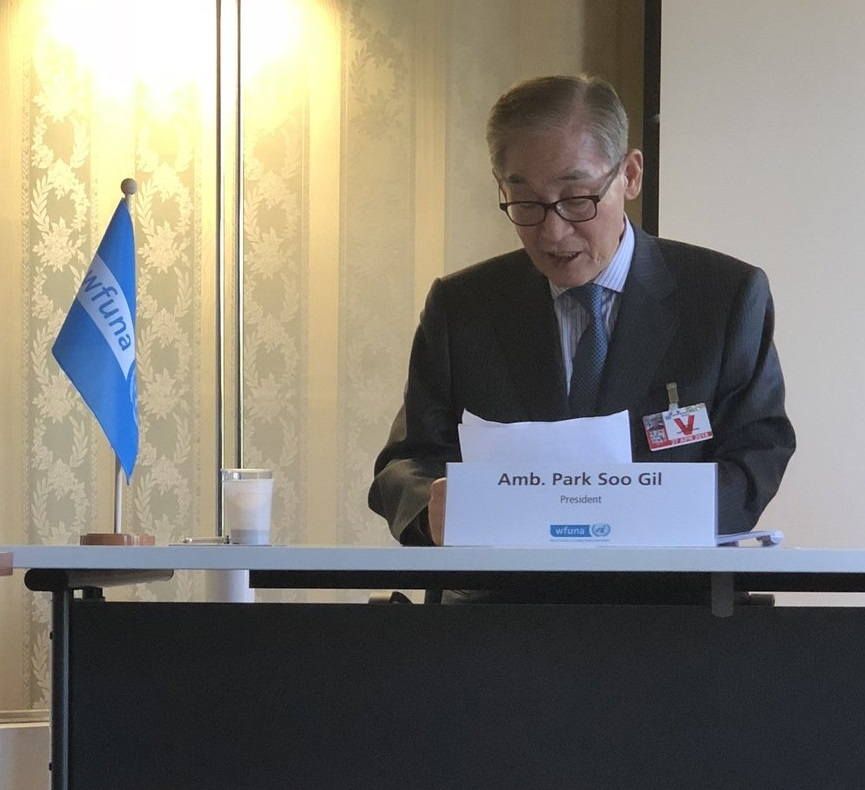

President, World Federation of United Nations Associations
- In office 11 August 2009 – 20 November 2018
- Preceded by: Hans Blix (Sweden)
- Succeeded by: Leonel Fernández (Dominican Republic)

Personal details
- Spouse: Seo Jung-ja

Park Soo-gil (Korean: 박수길; Hanja: 朴銖吉, born 18 October 1933, North Gyeongsang Province) is a South Korean diplomat and former ambassador of the Republic of Korea to the United Nations, where he also served as president of the Security Council in May 1997. Prior to that, he served as deputy foreign minister and as the Korean ambassador to Morocco and Canada. He is the former president of the World Federation of United Nations Associations, re-elected in November 2012 and to a third term in November 2015.

== Education ==
Park received a bachelor's degree from Korea University's College of Law in 1959 and a master's degree in international affairs from Columbia University's School of International Affairs and Public Administration.

== Diplomatic career ==
Park entered South Korea's diplomatic service in 1963, and held positions including director-general of treaty affairs, deputy minister for political affairs and chancellor of the Institute of Foreign Affairs and National Security. He later served as the Republic of Korea's ambassador to Morocco, Canada, the European Office of the United Nations in Geneva, and the United Nations in New York. He was Korea's ambassador to the UN when it was elected to the Security Council as a non-permanent member in 1996-97, and was president of the council in May 1997.

== Post-retirement career ==
After his retirement from Korea's diplomatic corps in 1998, Park served as a member of the UN's Subcommission on the Promotion and Protection of Human Rights, an organ of the former UN Commission on Human Rights (since replaced by the United Nations Human Rights Council) from 1999 to 2003.

He currently serves as chairman of the Policy Advisory Committee of Korea's National Human Rights Commission. He is a distinguished professor (emeritus) at Korea University's Graduate School of International Studies, and taught courses on international organizations and the United Nations. From 2003 to 2006, he was president of the United Nations Association of Korea, and was named an honorary president of the association when his term ended.

In August 2009, he was elected president of the World Federation of United Nations Associations (WFUNA), succeeding Dr. Hans Blix. At the triennial WFUNA Plenary Assembly in Rio de Janeiro in November 2012, he was re-elected to a second three-year term; he was re-elected again to a third term in Vancouver in November 2015. In his capacity as the federation's president, he maintained an office in Seoul.

== Publications ==
Park is a co-editor of "The UN in the 21st Century" (2000) and "UN, PKO and East Asian Security" (2002)

== Korean Air Flight 858 bombing ==
On 29 November 1987, a bomb planted by two North Korean agents exploded on Korean Air Flight 858 as it approached Bangkok from Abu Dhabi. The pair had left the flight in Abu Dhabi and were arrested in Bahrain as they tried to make their escape. One agent committed suicide using cyanide; the other, Kim Hyon Hui, was stopped before she could do the same and was taken into custody by Bahraini authorities. Park, at the time an assistant minister at Korea's Foreign Ministry, was dispatched to Bahrain to seek Kim's extradition. He succeeded, and escorted by Korean security officials, arrived in Seoul with Kim on 15 December. Allegations that the bombing was a plot by South Korea's intelligence agency surfaced quickly from Korea's left-wing political opposition, which called it an attempt to influence the Korean presidential election on 16 December. Despite those charges, the verdict that the plot was a North Korean operation, probably conducted in an effort to chill the atmosphere before the 1988 Seoul Olympics, has been nearly universally accepted domestically and internationally. North Korea continues to deny any involvement.

In the atmosphere of another heated presidential election campaign in late 2012, Korea's political left resurrected those charges; Park appeared on domestic television in August 2012 to recall his involvement in the matter and defend both the government's position and the validity of the public confession of Kim Hyon Hui.

== Personal ==
Park was born on 18 October 1933 in Gyeongsan County, North Gyeongsan Province. He was married to Seo Jung-ja in February 1961, and has two sons and a daughter. As a teenager, his education was interrupted by the Korean War; he spent part of the war years as an interpreter and casual employee of U.S. forces and the Korean government.

World Federation of United Nations Associations
Preceded by Hans Blix	President; 2009 – 2018	Succeeded by Leonel Fernandez
