= Temístocles Montás =

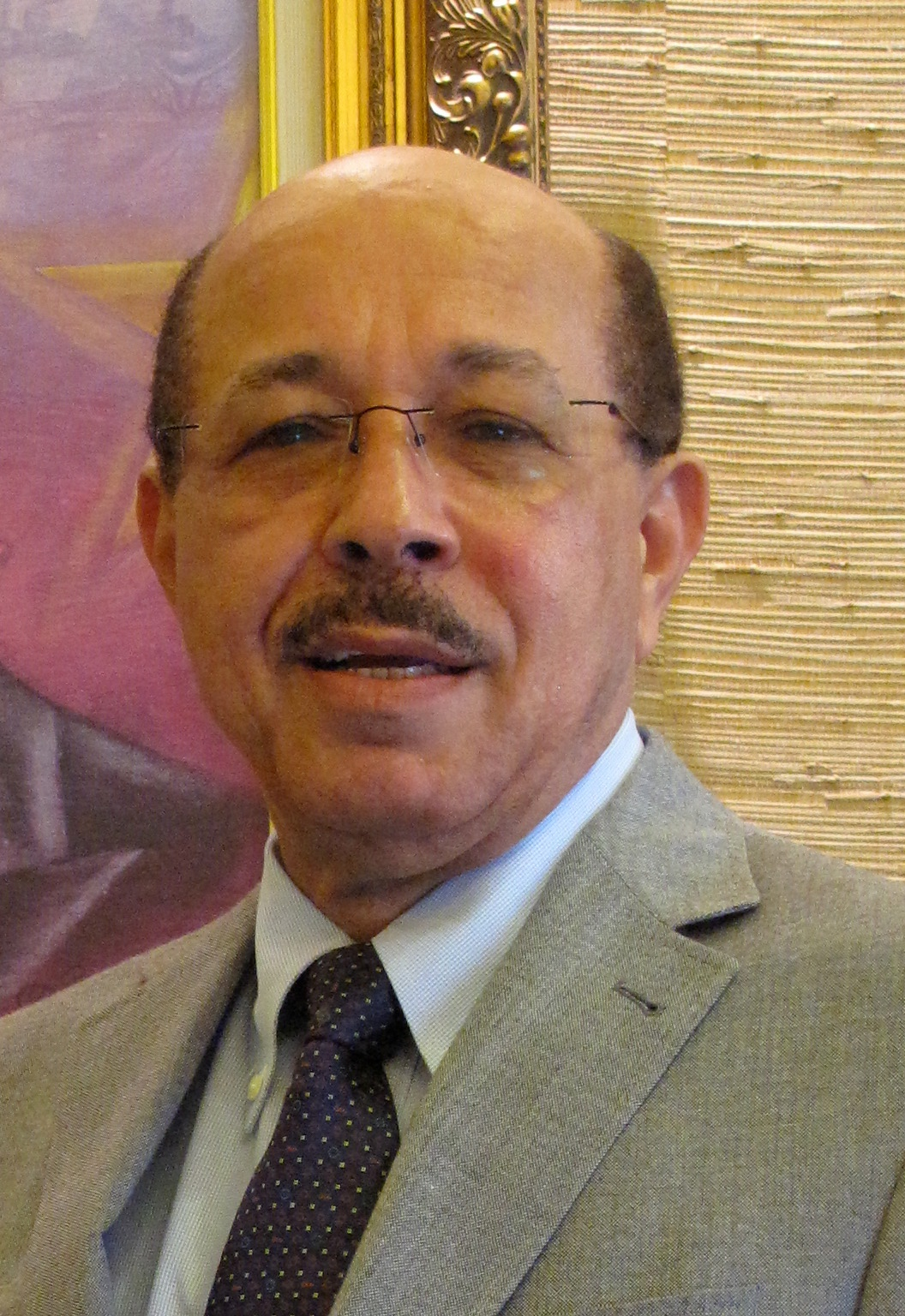

President of the Dominican Liberation Party
- In office 28 October 2019 – 7 March 2021
- Preceded by: Leonel Fernández
- Succeeded by: Danilo Medina

Minister of Industry and Trade of the Dominican Republic
- In office 16 August 2016 – 9 June 2017
- President: Danilo Medina

Minister of Economy, Planning and Development of the Dominican Republic
- In office 19 January 2007 – 16 August 2016
- President: Leonel Fernández; Danilo Medina
- Succeeded by: Isidoro Santana

Technical Secretary of The Presidency (Dominican Republic)
- In office 16 August 2004 – 19 January 2007
- President: Leonel Fernández
- Preceded by: Lic. Carlos Despradel
- In office 16 August 1998 – 16 August 2000
- President: Leonel Fernández
- Preceded by: Eduardo Selmán
- Succeeded by: Rafael Calderón

Secretary of State, CEO of the Dominican Electricity Corporation (Dominican Republic)
- In office 16 August 1996 – 16 August 1998
- President: Leonel Fernández
- Preceded by: Amílcar Romero
- Succeeded by: Radhamés Segura

Executive Director of the Global Foundation for Democracy and Development (FUNGLODE)
- In office 16 August 2000 – 16 August 2004

Deputy to the Congress of the Dominican Republic
- In office 16 August 1986 – 16 August 1990

Personal details
- Born: May 6, 1950 (age 76) San Cristóbal, Dominican Republic
- Party: Dominican Liberation Party (PLD)
- Spouse: Carmen Artero
- Children: Juan Carlos Montás Artero (b. 1980); Alfonso Temístocles Montás Artero (b. 1982); Raquel Indhira Montás Artero (b. 1983)
- Parent(s): Bienvenido Montás; Mercedes Domínguez
- Education: Universidad Autónoma de Santo Domingo, Universidad Politécnica de Madrid, España.
- Profession: Politician. Master in Economic Science, Ph.D in Engineering
- Net worth: ▲ (2012) RD$ 35.36 million (US$ 900,000)
- Website: Official website

Juan Temístocles Montás Domínguez (born May 6, 1950) is a Dominican politician, economist and former Minister of Industry and Trade of the Dominican Republic. He previously served as Minister of Economy, Planning and Development and Technical Secretary of State to the Presidency of the Dominican Republic from 1998 to 2016. Between October 28, 2019 and March 7, 2021, he was the President of the Dominican Liberation Party.

He's a member of the Dominican Liberation Party in which has a long time political affiliation and broad political career.

Born in San Cristóbal, Dominican Republic, in a family with 10 children.

Montás, holds a Ph.D. in engineering from the Technical University of Madrid and also a master's degree in Economics. With broad public and professional career, is a government official with long experience. His office has published several papers related to politics, economy and the electricity sector in the Dominican Republic.

The Montás family is descended from Claude Montás, a Haitian entrepreneur of French origin who was born in Mirebalais, Haiti.

== Political career and public life ==
Temístocles Montás was elected member of the first Central Committee of the Dominican Liberation Party in 1973. Close friend, disciple and collaborator of the late Professor Juan Bosch, he served as Vice-Secretary of Political Education, Coordinator of Special Agencies and Organizations Special Secretary of the Dominican Liberation Party. He was elected member of his political committee in 1990 together with Dr. Leonel Fernández and Lic Danilo Medina. Also held the post of Press Secretary of that political organization and is now the Secretary of International Relations of the Dominican Liberation Party (PLD), from where he has managed to make to efforts to involve the Political Party in international political forums like the COPPPAL, etc.

He has been since 1990 the coordinator of the technical teams that have prepared the Government Programs of the Dominican Liberation Party. He had a leading role in the political crisis in the Dominican Republic of 1994, events leading the called "Pact for Democracy" and as one of leader of his political organization, together with Danilo Medina and Leonel Fernández in 1996, were responsible for structuring a new political project inside the party, which later led to Leonel Fernández as a candidate for the Presidency of the Dominican Republic, who was elected winner of the elections held that year and became the first Head of State from Dominican Liberation Party.

Montás, assumed leadership of the campaign strategy for the years 1996, 2000, 2004 and 2008 of the Dominican Liberation Party, which with the exception of 2000, the party was the winner of the elections held in that country.

He was a deputy to the National Congress by the Dominican Liberation Party for the period 1986–1990. Also serves as adviser to the Chamber of Deputies of the Republic. Government official with broad experience, he served as CEO of the Dominican Electricity Corporation, now the Dominican Corporation of State Electrical Companies (CDEEE) from 1996 to 1998. In 1998 he was appointed Technical Secretary of the Presidency until 2000, playing a key role in the economic and financial area.

In August 2004 he was appointed for a second time, Technical Secretary of the Presidency, under the new Government of the Dominican Liberation Party, (PLD).

From the public positions he has had to assume, he has played a role in the elaboration of public policies aimed at ensuring the economic and social development of the Dominican Republic during the four years 2004–2008. With the enactment of Law No. 496-06 governing body that creates the system of planning and public investment in the Dominican Republic is appointed by the Executive as Secretary of State for Economic, Planning and Development, Ministry today, replacing the former Technical Secretariat of the Presidency.

== Head of the Government Economic Team ==
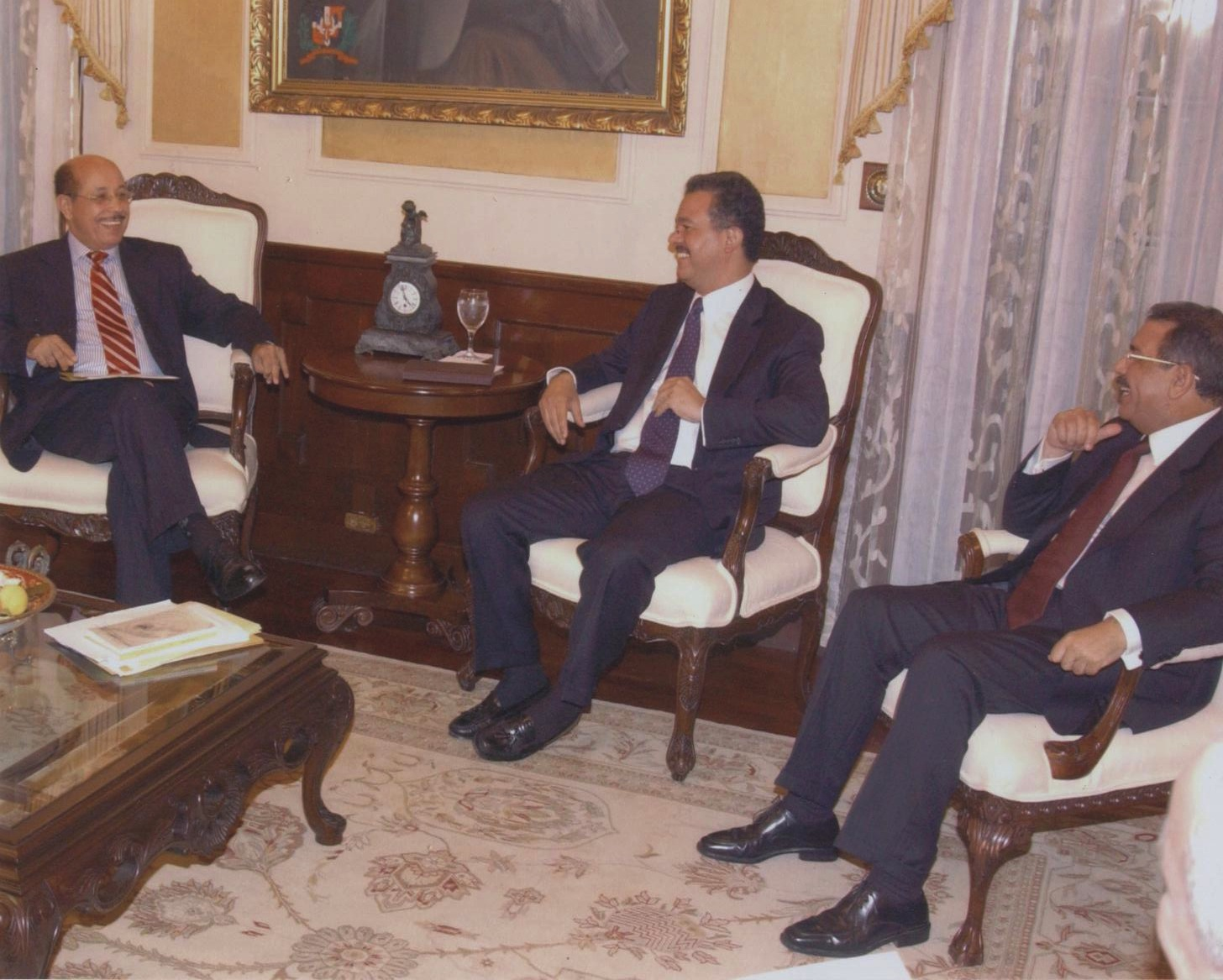
Temístocles Montás, Leonel Fernández and Danilo Medina during a meeting of the government's economic team in 2005.

In his capacity as Minister of Economy, Planning and Development, he was the coordinator of the Dominican Government Economic Team with the authority to lead and coordinate the process of formulating, managing, monitoring and evaluation of macroeconomic policies and sustainable development.

In his function as Minister of Economy, Planning and Development, represent the Dominican Republic as Governor at the World Bank Board of Governors. Also represent the country as Alternate Governor at the Inter-American Development Bank (IADB).

He is member of the Board of the Public Debt of the Dominican Republic, member of the Social Policy Cabinet and member of the National Council for Treaty Implementation and Administration of the Dominican government. Also acting in the development of foreign trade policy of the Dominican Republic, as well as the relevant trade negotiations. He serves as member of the Board of the Dominican Telecommunications Institute (the telecommunications governing body), and numerous other boards of directors of Dominican government institutions.

Headed the Dominican government team that negotiated the agreements of the Dominican debt restructuring with its creditors like Club Paris and private banks in 2005, which allowed to extend the Dominican Republic maturities of its debt and settle their long-term payments after the country faces the aftermath of the largest economic and financial crisis in his history that emerged in 2003 with the collapse of major private commercial banks.

=== National Development Strategy ===
The Dominican government through the Ministry of Economy, Planning and Development began a process of consulting and coordination with the participation of "prime movers" of the Dominican Republic, to define what would be the future of the country, leading to the preparation of a draft law to be submitted to the consideration of the Congress of the Dominican Republic for approval.

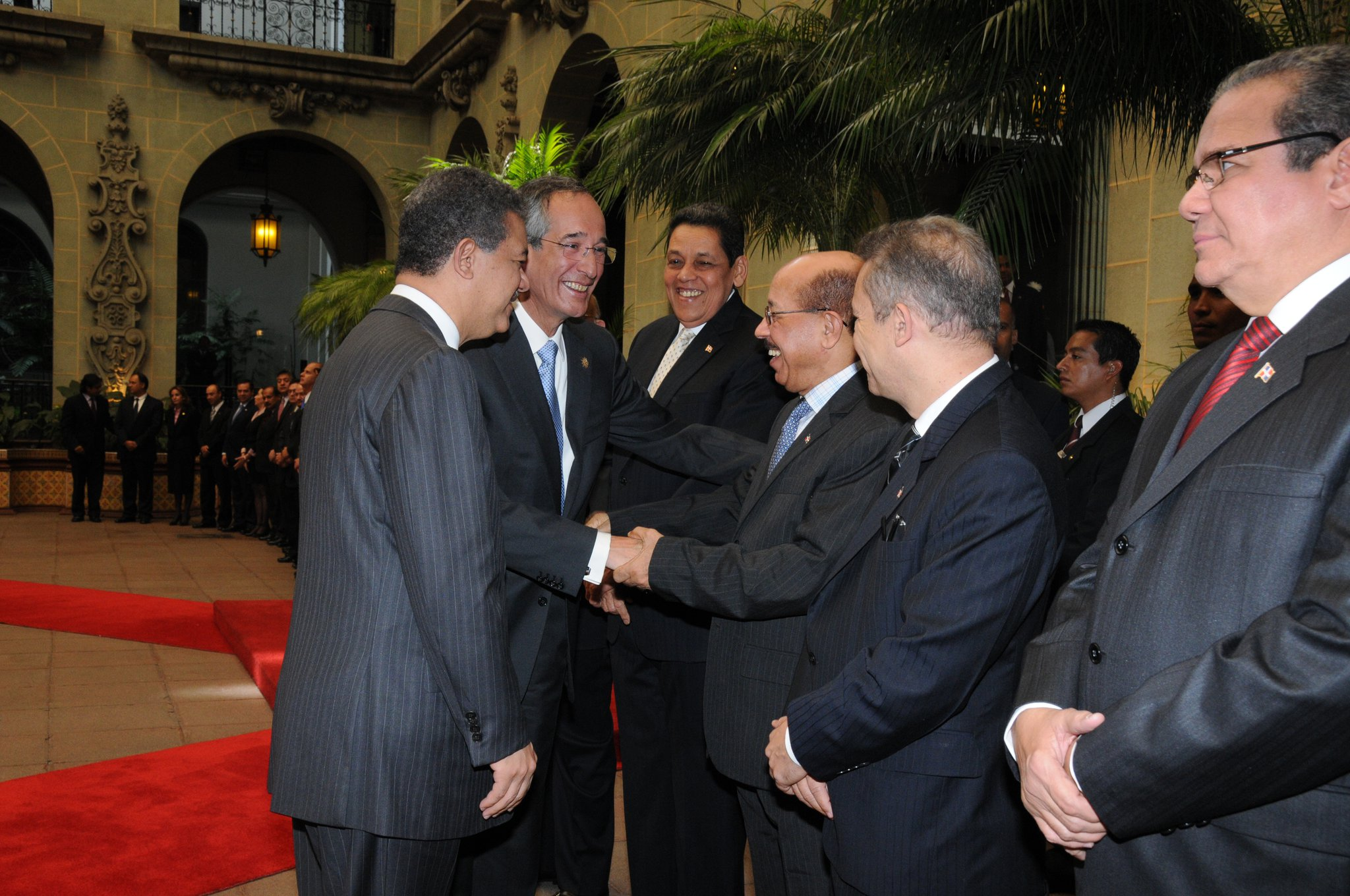
Minister Temístocles Montas shakes hands to the President of Guatemala Álvaro Colom.

=== Reappointment ===
On August 16, 2012 the new President of the Dominican Republic Danilo Medina, confirmed him as Minister of Economy, Planning and Development of the new government.

Mr. Montas resigned his post as Minister of Economy, Planning and Development after being implicated in the Odebrecht corruption scandal. He has since maintained his innocence and regained his freedom after posting bail and is now under house arrest awaiting the outcome of the trials.

== Academic career ==
He has been for more than two decades a university professor, author of several books related to economics, politics and the Dominican electricity sector. Graduated Summa Cum Laude (with high honors) in Chemical Engineering from the Autonomous University of Santo Domingo, where he was Dean of the Faculty of Chemical Engineering, holds a Ph.D. in Industrial Engineering from the Technical University of Madrid, Spain. Also, he has a high specialization in graduate studies and post-graduate degree in the fields of economics, evaluation and project development, international economics, foreign trade and international finance at the University of Barcelona, Spain.

He has been a speaker for national and international stages. He has held various roles in the private sector in the Dominican Republic. From 2000 until August 2004, he held the position of Executive Director Global Foundation for Democracy and Development, which presides Dr. Leonel Fernández, the former President of the Dominican Republic.

== Controversies ==
=== Odebrecht scandal ===
On the morning of May 29, 2017, Temístocles Montás was arrested by the Public Ministry who accused him of being part of the corruption network of the Brazilian multinational company Odebrecht. The arrest warrant was requested by the Attorney General of the Republic, Jean Alain Rodríguez, who accused Montas and thirteen other people of crimes of bribery, association of criminals, prevarication, illicit enrichment and money laundering. Montás Domínguez was arrested and taken to the Ciudad Nueva Palace of Justice jail by Dominican police officers as a defendant.

On May 30, 2017, Manuel Alejandro Rodríguez and José de Jesús Bergés Martín, acting as defense attorneys for Montás, petitioned the Criminal Chamber of the First Instance Court of the National District for a writ of habeas corpus, alleging irregularities committed during the prosecution process. detention of your client. The appeal was rejected.

On June 7, 2017, Temístocles Montás received a six-month coercion order in the Najayo model prison for his involvement in the corruption scandal of the Brazilian construction company Odebrecht.

The judge of the Special Instruction Francisco Ortega Polanco considered as valid the proposals of the Public Ministry dictating preventive detention of six months against Montas Domínguez at the same time that he declared the case as complex, giving the Public Ministry up to eight months to build and present its case against Montas and the thirteen others involved in the case.

== Appeal ==
On Saturday, July 8, the second chamber of the Supreme Court of Justice, acting as an appeal court for jurisdictional privileges, issued sentence number 2017-3043 in a public hearing, which varies the measure of coercion from Preventive prison to periodic presentation, and a bail of 15 million Dominican pesos in favor of the defense of Temistocles Montás and 6 other defendants, in her reading of the dissenting opinion, Judge Mirian Germán, presiding judge of the appeal court, argued that the evidence shown by the Public Ministry lacked of precise foundations which directly involve the accused.

On the night of June 7, 2018, the Public Ministry in a press conference led by the Attorney General of the Dominican Republic, declared that after conducting the most in-depth investigations, they did not find evidence to corroborate with some information from Brazil, for what they proceeded to file the binding file of Temístocles Montás.

== Family life ==
Montás was born in San Cristóbal, a province in the southern Dominican Republic, west of the capital Santo Domingo. His family founded the Dominican Liberation Party (PLD) in the city of San Cristóbal, Dominican Republic. He is married to Mrs. Carmen Artero, with whom he has two sons and one daughter, Alfonso Temístocles, Raquel Indhira and Juan Carlos.
