= International Commission of Science and Technology =

The Dominican Republic International Advisory Commission of Science & Technology - IACST (in Spanish Comisión Internacional Asesora de Ciencia y Tecnología- CIACT) is a government agency created by the President of the Dominican Republic, Dr. Leonel Fernández in September 2004 by decree number 1133-04. This decree was passed, establishing the International Commission of Science & Technology, as the body in charge with the task of preparing the Dominican Republic international strategies on Science and Technology.

The creation of the ICST required a comprehensive strategic plan to support and foster the Dominican Republic national development in science and technology. The mandated elements of the plan are:

1. The development of a Dominican Republic science and technology policy
2. The identification of strengths and weaknesses in the basic science resources and research capabilities in the Dominican Republic
3. The identification of methods to coordinate and encourage collaborative efforts between international research entities with the Dominican Republic, whether public or private
4. The designation of areas for potential scientific and technological development, including those affecting, either directly or indirectly, the economic development of the Dominican Republic nation
5. Recommendations on how to improve and strengthen partnerships among the private sector, higher education, and government with international organizations
6. Recommendations on how to improve the infrastructure for research and research training
7. Recommendations on a system to transfer international technology developments to the public and private sector in the Dominican Republic
8. Recommendations on legislative changes required to improve the overall science and technology environment in the country
9. Other recommendations on science and technology policy and programs as appropriate.

== See also ==
- Presidency of the Dominican Republic website, in Spanish
- Jose Santana
- CIACT Web Page
