= Hipólito Mejía =

President of the Dominican Republic from 2000 to 2004

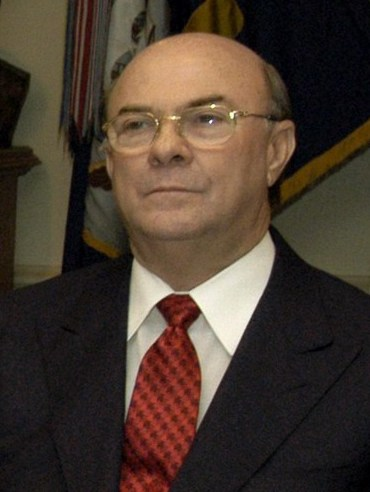
- Mejía in 2003

51st President of the Dominican Republic
- In office 16 August 2000 – 16 August 2004
- Vice President: Milagros Ortiz Bosch
- Preceded by: Leonel Fernández
- Succeeded by: Leonel Fernández

Secretary of Agriculture of the Dominican Republic
- In office 16 August 1978 – 16 August 1982
- President: Antonio Guzmán; Jacobo Majluta
- Preceded by: Pedro Agustín Bretón Taveras
- Succeeded by: José Rafael Ángeles Suárez

Personal details
- Born: 22 February 1941 (age 85) Santiago de los Caballeros, Dominican Republic
- Party: Modern Revolutionary Party
- Other political affiliations: Dominican Revolutionary Party
- Spouse: Rosa Gómez (m. 1964; died 2022)
- Children: Ramón Hipólito; Rafael Hipólito Felipe; Rosa Carolina; Lissa Rosina
- Relatives: Juan Garrigó Mejía (grandson); Sergio Grullón Estrella (brother-in-law); Juan Isidro Jimenes Grullón (second cousin); Francisca Otilia Domínguez (double second cousin); Tonty Rutinel (double second cousin once removed); Manny Rutinel (double second cousin twice removed)
- Education: Loyola Polytechnic Institute (HSD)
- Nickname(s): El Guapo de Gurabo; Papá (Dad)

Rafael Hipólito Mejía Domínguez (born 22 February 1941) is a Dominican politician who served as President of the Dominican Republic from 2000 to 2004.

During his presidential term in office the country was affected by one of its worst economic crises, generated by the bankruptcy of three major commercial banks in the country, which resulted in high inflation, high country risk rating, currency devaluation and increasing local poverty. Mejía sent 604 Dominican troops to fight in the Iraq War.

In the presidential election of 2004, he ran for a second term as the candidate of the Dominican Revolutionary Party but he was defeated by Leonel Fernández, whom he had succeeded as president in 2000, from the Dominican Liberation Party.

== Early life ==
Mejía Domínguez was born on 22 February 1941 at the José María Cabral y Báez Hospital in Santiago de los Caballeros, as the first child of Hipólito de Jesús ‘Polín’ Mejía Díaz and María Josefa ‘Marina’ Domínguez Viñals, both native of La Chichigua in Gurabo, place where he was raised. In his hometown he is known as Cabuyita, diminutive for cabuya (Latin American Spanish for "Agave twine"), because of the long blond straight hair that he had during his youth.

Mejía received a high school diploma from the Loyola Polytechnic Institute in San Cristóbal, Dominican Republic, graduating in 1962. Two years later, he attended special programs at North Carolina State University in the United States. On 4 July 1964 he married Rosa Gómez Arias, his third cousin. They have four children, among them, Carolina Mejía de Garrigó, a 2016 vice-presidential candidate.

At age twenty-four, he was appointed director and undersecretary of the national Tobacco Institute. In 1978, he was appointed Minister of Agriculture under the government of President Antonio Guzmán Fernández. During this period, agri-business incentive laws were passed and programs to promote rural agriculture development and technification were undertaken.

In 1982, Mejia was defeated in his campaign to become senator from Santiago Province. In 1990, he was named vice-presidential candidate on the ticket of Dominican Revolutionary Party leader José Francisco Peña Gómez.

== Presidency ==
In 2000, Mejía ran for president as the candidate of the left leaning Dominican Revolutionary Party (PRD) on a program to increase health, education, and social security services through tax hikes. He led the field in the 2000 presidential election, taking 49.87% of the vote in the first round. His main opponents, Danilo Medina and former president Joaquín Balaguer, received 24.9% and 24.6% of the vote, respectively.

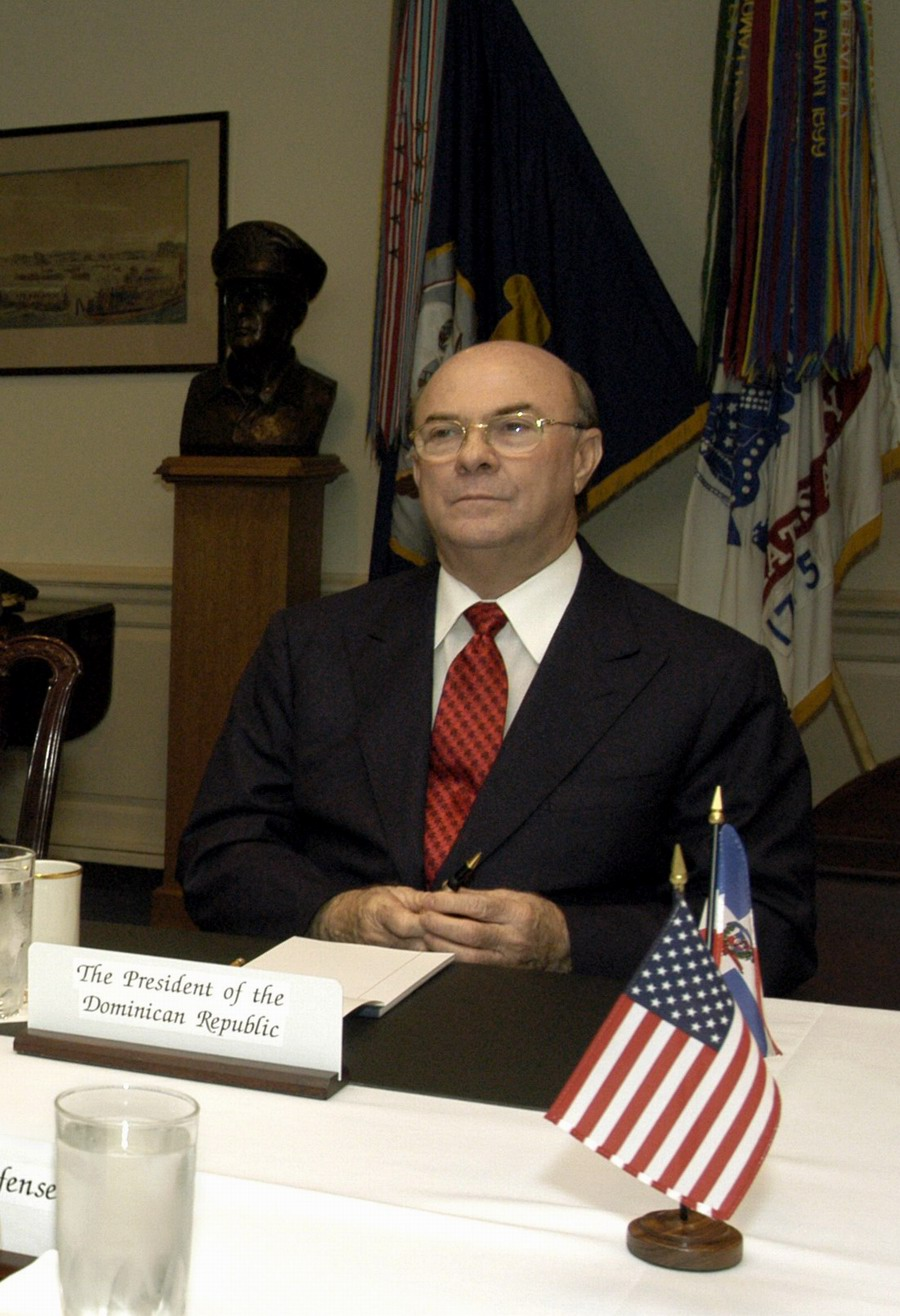
Mejia in a meeting with the U.S. Secretary of Defense Donald H. Rumsfeld in the Pentagon.

With Mejía just a few thousand votes short of the threshold for avoiding a runoff, his supporters claimed victory and urged Medina to concede. Medina soon realized that he stood no chance of closing a nearly 25-point gap with Mejía, especially when Balaguer suggested that some of his supporters might cross over to the PRD in the runoff. Medina would have needed nearly all of Balaguer's voters to cross over to him in order to have any realistic chance of winning. Accordingly, Medina pulled out of the runoff, handing the presidency to Mejía. Mejía took office on 16 August of that year.

During his presidency, he supported many popular issues, like social security, helping small businesses, agriculture, improving education and helping with adequate housing. He received considerable support from the people during the first two years of his mandate, which caused his party to win the congressional and municipal elections taking control of the Senate with 29 out of 31 senators.

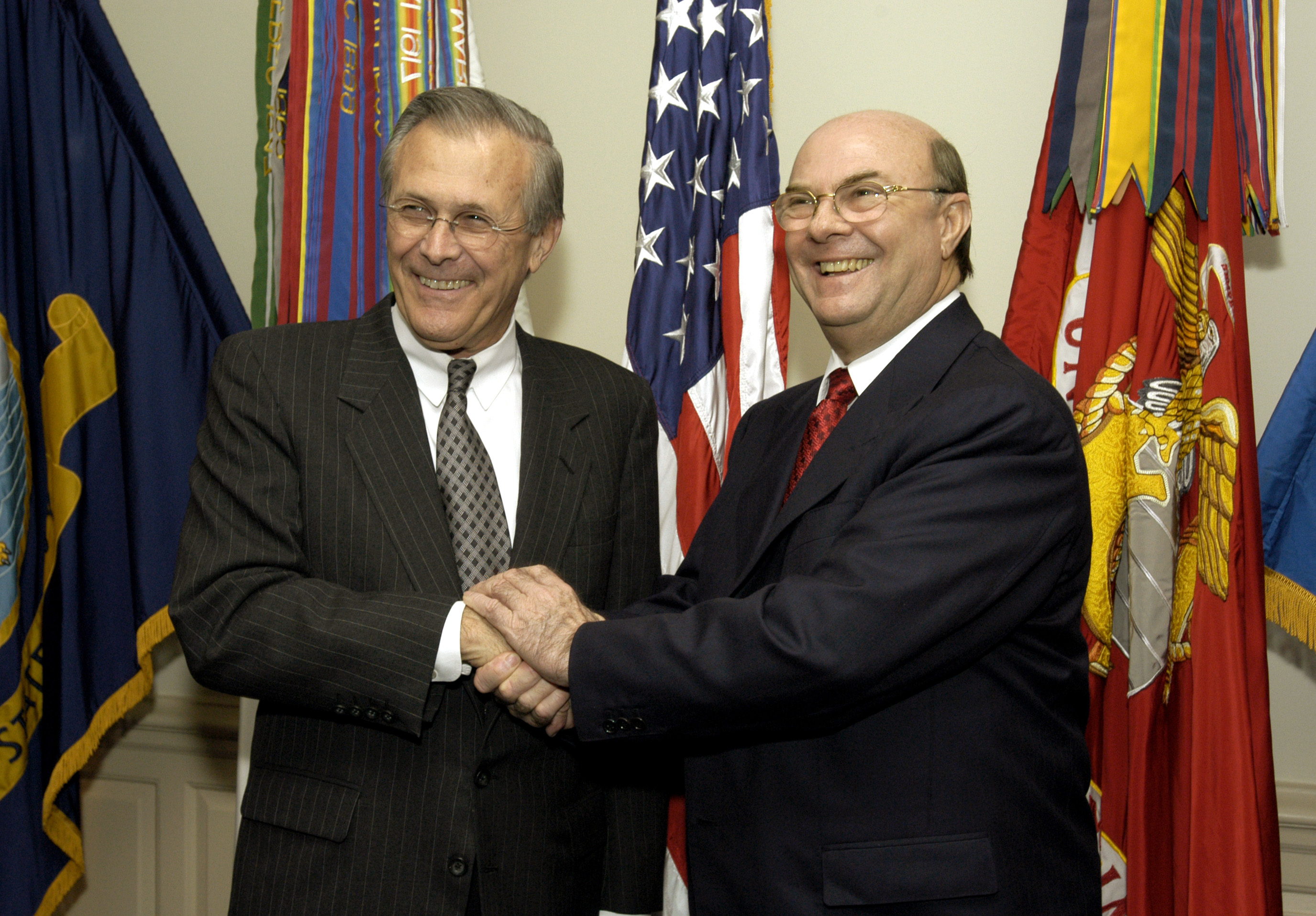
Hipólito Mejía (right) with Donald Rumsfeld (left)

During Mejía’s term, the country's second largest privately held commercial bank, Baninter, collapsed in a spectacular failure tied to long-standing political corruption. However, no evidence has ever linked Mejia to any corruption nor was he ever taken to court. Actually, it was later proved by international organizations such as the International Monetary Fund that the bank was fraudulently caused to fail − something for which its President and CEO Ramón Báez Figueroa was years later found guilty and sentenced to 10 years in prison.

During his term, Mejía attempted to spread government resources and services to thousands of smaller, rural communities scattered around the country instead of the traditional efforts to concentrate on big cities (where most voters live). He established the country's first social security type retirement system, and created a fixed advanced corporate tax of 1.5% to aid in government revenue collection.

His administration was packed with corruption and cronyism and also was not able to achieve the economic success and stability of his predecessor.

In March 2004, the Haiti Commission of Inquiry, headed by former US attorney general Ramsey Clark, published its findings : "Noting that 200 US special forces had travelled to the Dominican Republic for “military exercises” in February 2003, the commission accused the US of arming and training Haitian rebels there. With permission from the Dominican president, Hipólito Mejía, US forces trained near the border, in an area used by former soldiers of the disbanded Haitian army to launch attacks on Haitian state property." In the 2004 presidential election, he was defeated by Leonel Fernández, when he ran for re-election for a second term.

By the time Mejía left office, the Dominican Republic was undergoing a major economic crisis.

Mejía again contested the 2012 presidential election, losing to Danilo Medina, his 2000 election opponent.

== Criticism ==
In his time, Mejía faced both the highest and then the lowest approval ratings for a Constitutional President in recent times.

Mejía's first presidential campaign in 2000 won him the first Dominican presidency under then new electoral rules that required a "50 más 1" (50 percent plus one of the total votes in order to win in the first voting round.) This was in stark contrast to the late PRD leader, José Francisco Peña Gómez, who unsuccessfully ran for office three times consecutively (1990, 1994 and 1996) and never received the support that Mejia received in his first attempt.

While holding the seat of Head of State, Mejía actively sought to change the then current constitution in order for it to allow consecutive presidential re-elections. This was achieved with the aid of his party's majority stake at both legislative chambers (Senate and Lower Chamber). The original constitution prevented the previous president from contending against him in 2000.

== Ancestry ==
Coat of arms of Rafael Hipólito Mejía Domínguez as Knight Collar of the Order of Isabella the Catholic, attributed by Spain.

Three of Mejía′s grandparents were farmers native to Gurabo (Santiago Province) while his paternal grandfather, Segundo Mejía Mejía, was from Hato de San Marcos de Cañafístol (Peravia Province), then a ranch estate near Baní.

The Domínguez and the Díaz hails from Gurabo, being of colonial Canarian background. These families were traditionally farmers and merchants.

The Viñals hails from Santo Domingo of colonial Catalan background.

The Mejías from Cañafístol, Baní, were well-to-do white ranchers linked to the colonial petite aristocracy since the 1500s; endogamy was the custom in small communities and almost every generation of the Mejías married with relatives, meaning that Hipólito Mejía's bloodline includes several cousin marriages. President Mejía himself was married to a cousin, as well, until his wife's death in 2022.

Through his Báez, Villar and Soto ancestors, President Mejía is distantly related through many lines to President Danilo Medina, via Medina′s paternal grandfather —José María Medina Báez— who, alike Mejía′s paternal grandfather, was also from Baní. Three of Medina Báez grandparents were surnamed Báez. Their shared ancestors includes Lorenzo Báez de Cuéllar-Albornoz (seven times seventh cousins through him), Pedro del Villar María (four times seventh cousins through him), María de la Cruz de Arambule Maldonado (four times sixth cousins through her), Esteban Peguero Gómez (seven times ninth cousins through him), and Antonio de Soto y Hernández de Andújar.

== Popular culture ==
President Mejía is solely responsible for the popularity of the chacabana shirt (Guayabera) in the Dominican Republic as, before his presidency, the style was almost dead and mostly wore by a low number of senior citizens. Mejía was largely mocked and criticized by his opponents, the press, comedians, and a large number of the general population for making the presidency look informal by wearing white chacabanas every day to the National Palace instead of a suit and tie, like former presidents and leaders worldwide. Mejía rarely wore suits in public and only did so for highly formal events. All the public attention generated by his attire only allowed the style to be adopted by other prominent figures, his cabinet, and then men of all ages until the present day. It is the most popular male attire for elegant or formal occasions in the Dominican Republic.

A political poster with Mejía's face appears in the music video of Green Day's "Warning" at the time frame 1:55.

Political offices
Preceded by Leonel Fernández	President of the Dominican Republic; 2000–2004	Succeeded by Leonel Fernández
