= 2004 Dominican Republic presidential election =

← 2000	16 May 2004	2008 →
- Turnout: 72.84% (▼3.30pp)
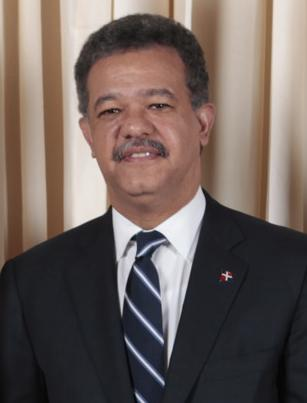

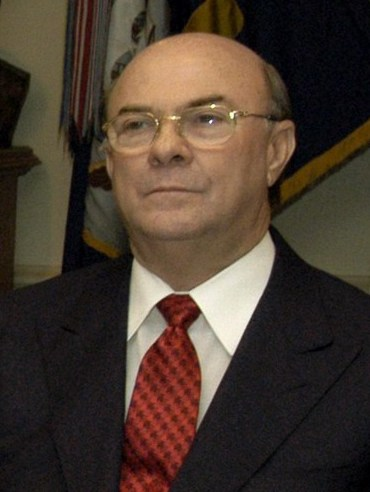

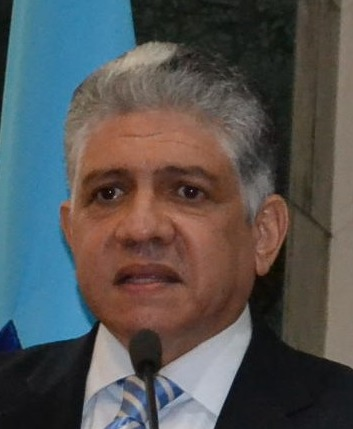
Nominee	Leonel Fernández	Hipólito Mejía	Eduardo Estrella
Party	PLD	PRD	PRSC
Popular vote	2,063,871	1,215,928	312,493
Percentage	57.11%	33.65%	8.65%
- Results by province
President before election
Hipólito Mejía
PRD
Elected President
Leonel Fernández
PLD

Presidential elections were held in the Dominican Republic on 16 May 2004. The result was a victory for former president Leonel Fernández, who defeated incumbent Hipólito Mejía. Voter turnout was 72.8%.

== Candidates ==
- Hipólito Mejía, serving president (2000-2004), representing the Dominican Revolutionary Party seeking immediate re-election.
- Leonel Fernández, president from 1996 to 2000, representing the Dominican Liberation Party seeking a second (non-consecutive) term.
- Eduardo Estrella of the Social Christian Reformist Party, a former senator and advisor to ex-president Joaquín Balaguer.

Opinion polls in the run-up to election day showed Fernández leading with 54%, Mejía on 27%, and Estrella on 14%. In the previous weeks, however, Mejía had been gaining support while Fernández's numbers had been falling and, as a result, at one point it seemed possible that a second round run-off vote would have to be held between the two top candidates. Fernández's final result, in excess of 50%, meant that the second round was not necessary.

=== Overseas voting ===
The Dominican Republic introduced legislation in 1997 to enable Dominican citizens residing abroad to vote in presidential elections. This was the first time the provisions of that law were put into practice, with some 52,500 registered overseas voters eligible to vote at polling stations set up in several American cities including Miami and New York, as well as Montréal, Caracas, Madrid and Barcelona.

Electoral officials noted that 52,500 was only a fraction of the overseas voters actually eligible to vote (one million Dominicans are estimated to live in the United States alone), but that the take-up rate was hampered by a lack of information regarding the necessary formalities and by bureaucratic hurdles (particularly, the requirement that up-to-date national ID cards be presented).

== Results ==
Candidate	Party	Votes	%
Leonel Fernández	Dominican Liberation Party	2,063,871	57.11
Hipólito Mejía	Dominican Revolutionary Party	1,215,928	33.65
Eduardo Estrella	Social Christian Reformist Party	312,493	8.65
Rafael Flores Estrella	Force of the Revolution	4,737	0.13
Ramón Almánzar	New Alternative Party	4,195	0.12
Trajano Santana	Independent Revolutionary Party	3,994	0.11
Héctor Rafael Peguero Méndez	Christian People's Party	3,383	0.09
Raúl Pérez Peña	Party for Authentic Democracy	1,834	0.05
Ramón Emilio Concepción	National Solidarity Movement	1,450	0.04
Carlos Manuel Bencosme	Dominican Social Alliance	1,043	0.03
Ramón Nelson Didiez Nadal	People's Democratic Party	772	0.02
Total		3,613,700	100.00
Valid votes		3,613,700	98.82
Invalid/blank votes		43,150	1.18
Total votes		3,656,850	100.00
Registered voters/turnout		5,020,703	72.84
Source: JCE
