= José María Nouel Simpson =

Dominican diplomat (1904–1967)

The Honorable José María Nouel Simpson

Minister-Counselor at the Dominican Republic Embassy in Washington, DC
- In office 1947–?
- Appointed by: Rafael Trujillo

Consul-General of the Dominican Republic to Miami, United States
- In office 1946–1947
- Appointed by: Rafael Trujillo
- Vice consul: Ramón Lovatón Pittaluga
- Preceded by: Germán Emilio Ornes Coiscou
- Succeeded by: José María Pichardo Brache

First Secretary of the Legation of the Dominican Republic in Cuba
- In office 1946–1946
- Appointed by: Rafael Trujillo

Consul of the Dominican Republic to Miami, United States
- In office 1942–1946
- Appointed by: Manuel Troncoso de la Concha

Personal details
- Born: 1 January 1904 Puerto Plata, Dominican Republic
- Died: 15 September 1967 (aged 63) Santo Domingo, Dominican Republic
- Citizenship: Dominican Republic
- Spouse: Ligia Malvina Henríquez
- Parents: José María Nouel (father); Grace Simpson (mother)

José María Nouel Simpson (1 January 1904–15 September 1967) was a Dominican diplomat.

== Early life and family ==
José María Nouel Simpson was born in Puerto Plata, Dominican Republic on 1 January 1904, and was baptised in the local Roman Catholic Church parish on 1 February 1904.

Nouel Simpson was the son of Dominican lawyer and politician José María Nouel Bobadilla and his American wife Grace Simpson. His mother was born in Puerto Plata, Dominican Republic but as a daughter of a US diplomat she was born without Dominican citizenship per customary international law. His maternal grandparents were the American merchant Thomas Simpson (from Sag Harbor, NY), who was the United States consul in Puerto Plata from 1884 to 1905, and his Dominican wife Clementine Simpson (née Clementina Neumann y Paris), who became a US citizen by jus matrimonii because of her marriage in 1883 to the US diplomat and was herself the daughter of a German man and a French woman that had migrated in the 19th century to the Dominican Republic. His paternal grandparents were Dominican historian, lawyer and lawmaker Carlos Rafael Nouel Pierret (who was of French descent) and his wife Clemencia Bobadilla (who was half French, half Spanish).

Nouel Simpson descended from President Tomás Bobadilla, the first ruler of the Dominican Republic; also he was nephew of monsignor Adolfo Alejandro Nouel, former President of the Dominican Republic.

== Career ==
In March 1937, Nouel Simpson co-founded the "President Trujillo" University Guard (GUPT), a pro-dictatorship paramilitary group at the University of Santo Domingo.

In 1942, Nouel Simpson was Consul to Miami, he was briefly First Secretary of the Legation of the Dominican Republic in Cuba in January 1946, and later in April of that year Nouel Simpson became Consul-General to Miami, United States.

Nouel Simpson served as secretary of the Dominican delegation to the San Francisco Conference in 1945. In March of 1947, he was appointed Minister-Counselor at the Dominican Republic Embassy in the U.S. capital.

== Private life and family ==
In 1939 Nouel Simpson married Ligia Malvina Henríquez Mon (1917–2010), the daughter of Gustavo Henríquez Velázquez (who was grandnephew of Federico and Francisco Henríquez y Carvajal) and his wife Blanca Malvina Mon de Soto (granddaughter of 19th-century senator Faustino de Soto Noboa and great-great-granddaughter of General Ramón Santana). They had two children: José and Grace Nouel, who were both born in Miami when his father was consul, they were not born with US citizenship per customary international law. Nouel Simpson is the maternal grandfather of José Ignacio Paliza.

== Ancestry ==
Nouel Simpson belong to a notable elite family from the Dominican Republic, that had presidents, senators, ministers and consuls.

Ancestry of José María Nouel Simpson

8. Jean Baptiste Adolphe Nouel
4. Carlos Rafael Nouel Pierret (1833–1905)
9. Jeanne Rose Marguerite Pierret
2. José María Nouel Bobadilla (1864–1951)
10. Tomás Bobadilla y Briones (1786–1871)
5. Clemencia Antonia Bobadilla y Desmier d'Olbreuse (1835–1876)
11. María Virginia Desmier d'Olbreuse y Allard (1795–1879)
1. José María Nouel Simpson (1904–1967)
12. Thomas Simpson
6. Thomas Simpson (1841–?)
13. Jane
3. Grace Simpson (1884–?)
14. Ludwig Karl Albert Neumann (ca.1818–1874)
7. Clementina Rafaela Neumann Paris (ca.1860–?)
15. Marie-Françoise Henriette Paris (ca.1830–?)
