= José Ignacio Paliza =

Dominican politician (born 1981)

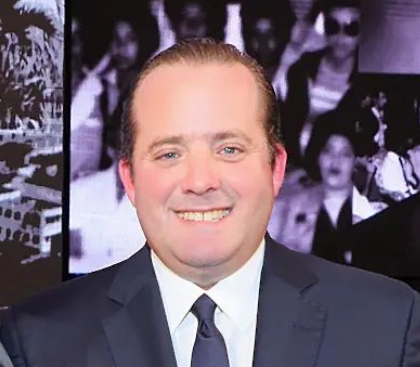
- Ignacio Paliza in 2024

Minister of the Presidency
- Incumbent
- Assumed office 16 August 2024
- President: Luis Abinader
- Deputy ministers: Roger Pujols (2024–present); Luis Gregorio Madera Sued (2024–present); Alexis Isaac Jiménez González (2024–present); María del Pilar Cañas (2024–present); Edgar Batista Carrasco (2024–present); Camel Curi Lora (2020–present)
- Preceded by: Joel Santos

Minister for Administrative Affairs of the Presidency
- In office 16 August 2020 – 16 August 2024
- President: Luis Abinader
- Deputy: Deputy ministers: Dilia Leticia Jorge Mera (2020–present); Juan Garrigó Mejía (2020–present); Andrés Alberto Lugo Risk (2020–2024); Igor David Rodríguez Durán (2020–2024); José Gabriel Jáquez Vásquez (2020–present); Víctor D’Aza Tineo (2020–2021); Osval Antonio Saldivar Mota (2021–present)
- Preceded by: José Ramón Peralta
- Succeeded by: Andrés Bautista

President of the Modern Revolutionary Party
- In office 14 June 2018 – 5 September 2026
- Preceded by: Andrés Bautista
- Succeeded by: Luis Abinader

Senator for Puerto Plata
- In office 16 August 2016 – 16 August 2020
- Preceded by: Francis Vargas
- Succeeded by: Ginette Bournigal

Deputy for Puerto Plata
- In office 16 August 2010 – 16 August 2016

Personal details
- Born: 1 September 1981 (age 45) Santo Domingo, Dominican Republic
- Citizenship: Dominican Republic (1981–present); Spain (1981–2017)
- Party: Modern Revolutionary Party (2014–present)
- Other political affiliations: Dominican Revolutionary Party (until 2014)
- Spouse: Isabel Lucía Brugal Portela

José Ignacio Ramón Paliza Nouel (born 1 September 1981) is a Dominican politician and lawyer. He is the chairman of the Modern Revolutionary Party since 14 June 2018, and Minister of the Presidency (equivalent to Prime Minister in some presidentialist countries such as Peru or Secretary to the President in the United States) since 16 August 2024. He was senator representing the province of Puerto Plata for the 2016–2020 period, and Minister for Administrative Affairs of the Presidency (National Palace chief of staff) from 2020 to 2024.

== Early life and family ==
Paliza Nouel is the son of businessman and honorary consul of Spain in Puerto Plata, Juan Ignacio Paliza García, and nephew of entrepreneurs José Manuel Paliza and Elena Viyella de Paliza. His grandfather Benito Paliza Torre was a Spanish immigrant who was dedicated to work in the coffee industry upon his arrival to the Dominican Republic.

His mother, Grace Malvina Nouel, was born in Miami, Florida, during the period her father was Consul appointed by the dictator Rafael Trujillo for his particular adherence to him; she is the daughter of José María Nouel Simpson (son of lawyer and minister of the Interior José María Nouel Bobadilla, son of historian, lawyer and legislator Carlos Rafael Nouel Pierret and brother of archbishop and president of the Dominican Republic Adolfo Alejandro Nouel Bobadilla, and Grace Simpson Neumann, the daughter of Thomas Simpson, the United States consul in Puerto Plata from 1884 to 1905), and Ligia Malvina Henríquez Mon. On his mother's side, he descends from President Tomás Bobadilla, the first ruler of the Dominican Republic; Paliza Nouel is great-grandnephew of monsignor Adolfo Alejandro Nouel.

In 2003, he earned a doctorate in law (magna cum laude), at Universidad Iberoamericana (UNIBE); he studied International Studies of Law, Business and Public Policy, and Public Finance Management, at Georgetown, Pennsylvania and Harvard, respectively.

== Politics ==
He was elected with just 28 years as a deputy to the 2010–2016 legislature, and was the youngest member of the Congress of the Dominican Republic.

In his 2010 sworn statement of assets, Paliza stated that he had a negative equity, as he owed RD$ 5 million (US$135,000) to his father (who died in 2014). In 2016 he reported to have RD$13.38 million (US$291,000) in assets. In 2020, Paliza's net worth rose to RD$23.08 million (US$395,000).

In August 2014, along with more than thirty deputies defectors he entered into the Modern Revolutionary Party (PRM), following a split in the Dominican Revolutionary Party (PRD).

Paliza was elected President and Chairman of the Modern Revolutionary Party in the primary elections held on 18 March 2018, he took office on 14 June 2018.

In 2024 he declared a net worth of about 28 million Dominican pesos (equivalent to $460,000).

== Private life and family ==
Paliza held Spanish citizenship until 2017.

He is married to Isabel Lucía Brugal Portela, daughter of businessman Ricky Brugal León, and have 2 children.

== Ancestry ==
Paliza's maternal family was a notable elite family in the Dominican Republic. His ancestors includes Presidents, Senators, Ministers and Consuls.

Family tree of José Ignacio Paliza

8. Juan Paliza Ortiz
4. Benito Paliza Torre (1898–1964)
9. Dolores Torre Ugarte
2. Juan Ignacio Paliza García (1946–2014)
10. Ciríaco García López
5. Asunción García La Calle (1919–1986)
11. Mónica La Calle
1. José Ignacio Paliza Nouel
12. José María Nouel Bobadilla (1864–1951)
6. José María Nouel Simpson (1904–1967)
13. Grace Simpson Neumann
3. Grace Malvina Nouel Henríquez (1947–present)
14. Gustavo Julio Henríquez Velásquez (1892–?)
7. Ligia Malvina Henríquez Mon (1917–2010)
15. Blanca Malvina Mon de Soto (1899–1976)
