= Global Foundation for Democracy and Development =

- Abbreviation: GFDD
- Formation: 2002
- Headquarters: 1629 K st. NW, suite 1100, Washington, DC 20006; 780 Third Avenue, 19th Floor, New York, NY 10017
- Official language: English, Spanish
- Executive Director: Natasha Despotovic

Global Foundation for Democracy and Development (GFDD) is a non-profit, non-partisan organization dedicated to promoting collaboration between organizations in the United States and the Dominican Republic. Global Foundation for Democracy and Development (GFDD) is a sister institution of Fundación Global Democracia y Desarrollo (FUNGLODE). It was created in 2002 by Dr. Leonel Fernández, at the end of his first term as Head of State.

== Locations ==
GFDD has offices in Washington, D.C., New York City and Santo Domingo.
