= Franciscan University murders =

1999 criminal case in Ohio, United States

Franciscan University Murders
- Location: 40°22′09″N 80°37′49″W; Steubenville, Ohio, United States
- Date: May 31, 1999 ca. 5:00 a.m. (EDT)
- Attack type: Kidnapping, grand theft auto, torture murder
- Weapon: .44 Magnum caliber revolver
- Deaths: 2
- Injuries: 1
- Perpetrators: Terrell Yarbrough, Nathan "Boo" Herring

The Franciscan University murders is an American criminal case involving the kidnapping of two young men from Steubenville, Ohio, and their murder in Washington County, Pennsylvania, on May 31, 1999.

In 2000, Nathan Herring and Terrell Yarbrough were found guilty on several counts. The convictions were overturned in 2004 following an Ohio Supreme Court decision to try the defendants per each crime committed in the respective state in which the crimes occurred. In response to the decision, "Brian and Aaron's Law" passed into Ohio state law in April 2005, which permits authorities to prosecute suspects in murder cases that begin in that state but have related activities in another state.

== Background ==
Aaron Land, 20, Brian Muha, age 18, and Andrew Doran were students at Franciscan University living in a street-level apartment in Steubenville, Ohio. On May 30, 1999, Muha parked his mother's Chevrolet Blazer outside their apartment.

Nathan "Boo" Herring and Terrell Yarbrough, both 18, were residents of the Steubenville area. Herring later stated that he had consumed beer, cocaine, marijuana, and prescription drugs before the crimes committed on May 31, 1999.

== Events of May 31, 1999 ==
During the early morning hours of May 31, 1999, Land and Doran were asleep in their bedrooms, and Muha was asleep on the living room couch. At approximately 5:00 a.m. on May 31, 1999, Yarbrough and Herring broke into the apartment and woke up Land and Muha by repeatedly hitting them with a pistol. Yarbrough and Herring then demanded the keys to the Blazer, and Muha gave them the keys. Doran was awakened by the noise of "a loud series of crashes," and crawled out a window and re-entered the house by a side door and called to Aaron and Brian. There was no response. Doran then saw a black male with a white handkerchief over his mouth and a hood pulled over his head. The man saw Doran; however he ran and managed to escape to a nearby residence and called the police.

Yarbrough and Herring forced Land and Muha out of the house and into the back seat of the Blazer and drove toward Pittsburgh. In Robinson Township, Washington County, Pennsylvania, Yarbrough and Herring stopped the Blazer alongside U.S. Route 22. They forced the victims out of the car and into a forested area. Herring then separately shot both victims in the back of the head with a .44-caliber handgun, killing each of them instantly. Yarbrough and Herring then took Muha’s ATM card, some cash, walked back to the Blazer, and drove to Pittsburgh.

After unsuccessfully attempting to withdraw cash using Muha's ATM card in Pittsburgh, Yarbrough and Herring went to the Squirrel Hill section of Pittsburgh to steal a second car. Barbara Vey became Yarbrough and Herring's next victim, as they attacked her in the stairwell of her apartment complex and demanded the keys to her car. Apparently Herring was going to shoot and kill Vey; however, Yarbrough intervened, sparing her life. Vey gave her keys to the men and called the police after they left. Later that afternoon, Yarbrough drove the Blazer back to Steubenville, and Herring in Vey's stolen BMW. En route, Yarbrough ran out of gas and Herring did not stop to assist him. Brian Porter, a passing motorist, stopped and gave Yarbrough a ride to a nearby gas station.

After returning to Steubenville, Yarbrough met with a friend, Brandon Young, and they drove around together in the Blazer. After Young inquired where the Blazer was from Yarbrough admitted to him that he had killed Muha and Land and stolen the car. Police spotted the Blazer at around 6 o'clock that evening. Yarbrough and Young both abandoned the car, but Yarbrough was captured after a short chase. At 8 pm police recovered Vey's stolen BMW. On June 2, police apprehended Young, who had eluded capture earlier, and Yarbrough's accomplice Herring without incident. Muha and Land's bodies were found after an extensive search on June 4, 1999.

== Trials ==
Prosecutors opted to hold one trial for each defendant in Ohio rather than trials in both states, saying it would be more efficient and compassionate for the victims' families. Herring was convicted and sentenced to life in prison without parole in August 2000. Yarbrough was convicted and sentenced to death in September 2000.

The Supreme Court of Ohio overturned the murder convictions in 2004, ruling the case should have been tried in Pennsylvania, where the bodies of Mr. Muha and Mr. Land were found, but sustained the convictions for the offenses that occurred in Ohio, including kidnapping and robbery. Yarbrough and Herring were subsequently extradited to Pennsylvania to be retried for the murders.

The new trial began for defendant Terrell Yarbrough on October 26, 2009 in Washington County, Pennsylvania. The defendant was sentenced to life in prison as a result of the second trial.

Defendant Nathan Herring pleaded guilty and was sentenced to life imprisonment on July 8, 2010.
