= Fundación Global Democracia y Desarrollo =

- Abbreviation: FUNGLODE
- Formation: 2000
- Headquarters: Calle Capitán Eugenio de Marchena 26, La Esperilla, Santo Domingo, Republica Dominicana
- Official language: Spanish
- Executive Director: Marco Herrera
- Affiliations: ECOSOC General Consultative Status
- Website: Official website

Fundación Global Democracia y Desarrollo (FUNGLODE) is a non-profit organization founded by Dr. Leonel Fernández, ex-President of the Dominican Republic. FUNGLODE has a sister institution called Global Foundation for Democracy and Development (GFDD). FUNGLODE has offices in Santo Domingo.
