= Universidad Federico Henríquez y Carvajal =

Private university in the Dominican Republic

- Type: Private university
- Established: 12 February 1991
- Rector: Alberto Ramírez Cabral
- Location: Santo Domingo, Dominican Republic
- Website: ufhec.edu.do

Universidad Federico Henríquez y Carvajal (UFHEC) is a private university based in Santo Domingo, Dominican Republic, with campuses in several regions of the country. Established under Decree No. 57-91 of 12 February 1991, the institution is named after Dominican educator, writer and intellectual Federico Henríquez y Carvajal.

The university provides undergraduate, technical and postgraduate education in health sciences, business, law, education, engineering, psychology and communication. Its official website identifies seven campuses, including locations in Santo Domingo, La Romana, Baní, Moca and the province of San Juan.

UFHEC's academic activities include professional education, scientific research, technology development and community engagement. Its research portfolio includes projects in sustainable agriculture, environmental management, renewable energy, waste management and health sciences. The university has participated in international academic partnerships and in the Dominican Republic's national higher education quality evaluation system.

== History ==
=== Foundation and early development ===
According to its institutional history, UFHEC was named at the suggestion of its founder, Carlos Cornielle, in honor of Federico Henríquez y Carvajal, a Dominican intellectual associated with education, literature and civic life.

The university's sponsoring foundation was incorporated under Decree No. 544-88 of 25 November 1988. On 12 February 1991, the institution was formally constituted as Universidad Federico Henríquez y Carvajal through Decree No. 57-91, which authorized it to award academic degrees.

Carlos Cornielle served as the founding rector. The university's historical account describes an early organizational structure with its main premises on Avenida Isabel Aguiar in Santo Domingo and extensions in other Dominican provinces.

Margarita Cornielle Mendoza became rector in 1994. The institution subsequently experienced several administrative transitions involving María Teresa Herrero, Rubén Tavarez, William Capellán and other university officials.

=== Institutional development since 2004 ===
On 12 August 2004, according to the university's institutional history, a governing board chaired by William Hunter appointed Alberto Ramírez Cabral as rector.

The university reports that its subsequent development included changes in academic administration, curricula, infrastructure and institutional planning. During the following decades it expanded its geographical presence and introduced additional undergraduate and postgraduate programs.

In July 2018, the National Council of Higher Education, Science and Technology (CONESCyT) approved the creation of UFHEC's Metropolitan Campus in Santo Domingo. The university announced that the campus included classrooms, an auditorium, an odontological clinic, computing facilities, audiovisual production spaces and a library.

The university continued developing campuses outside Santo Domingo, including its San Juan–Las Matas campus, which opened in 2021.

=== Historical regulatory matters ===
U.S. records from the 1990s discussed UFHEC's early institutional history in connection with Universidad Mundial Dominicana, previously administered by Ronald Bauer. A 1996 United States Department of Education proceeding terminated UFHEC's eligibility for federal student financial aid under Title IV; in 1998, the Medical Board of California disapproved its medical school for California medical licensing purposes. Later reporting also described allegations concerning accelerated medical degree arrangements in the 1990s.

== Institutional philosophy ==
UFHEC publishes a mission, vision and set of institutional values that guide its educational activities. Its stated educational philosophy combines professional preparation, research and knowledge creation with civic responsibility and a Christian perspective.

=== Mission ===
The university states that its mission is to provide comprehensive professional education within an environment of research and knowledge creation, preparing graduates to perform competently and ethically in personal, social and professional contexts at national and international levels.

The mission includes an emphasis on citizenship, professional responsibility and a Christian understanding of human development.

=== Vision ===
UFHEC's declared vision emphasizes the quality of its academic programs, scientific and technological research, and contributions to socioeconomic development in the communities where the university operates.

=== Institutional values ===
The university identifies six principal institutional values:

- Responsibility – fulfillment of academic, professional and social commitments.
- Solidarity – cooperation and concern for other members of the university community and society.
- Equity – fair treatment and recognition of differing needs.
- Justice – respect for rights and ethical principles.
- Honesty – integrity in personal and professional conduct.
- Respect – recognition of human dignity and social coexistence.

These values are also incorporated into the university's published student regulations and educational philosophy.

=== Institutional identity ===
The university has an institutional hymn and publishes guidelines for its visual identity. The hymn emphasizes education, knowledge, social progress and the ideals associated with Federico Henríquez y Carvajal. The university makes its lyrics and an audio recording available through its official website.

== Campuses and geographical presence ==
UFHEC operates a multicampus university system serving communities in the Dominican Republic's metropolitan, northern, eastern and southern regions. Its website identifies seven campuses.

=== Metropolitan Campus ===
The Metropolitan Campus is located on Avenida Máximo Gómez at the intersection with César Nicolás Penson in Santo Domingo.

Its development was approved by CONESCyT in 2018. The facilities described by the university include lecture rooms, an auditorium, postgraduate dental training facilities, computing laboratories, audiovisual production spaces, library services and administrative offices.

The Metropolitan Campus also houses postgraduate academic activities and administrative functions.

=== Santo Domingo Oeste Campus ===
The Santo Domingo Oeste Campus is located on Avenida Isabel Aguiar in the western metropolitan area.

The campus is associated with the university's early institutional development and offers programs in several fields, including business, education, health sciences and other professional disciplines.

The university's undergraduate dental training facilities are located at this campus.

=== Las Américas Campus ===
The Las Américas Campus serves the eastern Santo Domingo metropolitan area.

It forms part of the university's expansion of educational services in densely populated urban communities, providing undergraduate education in areas included in UFHEC's institutional academic catalogue.

=== La Romana Campus ===
The La Romana Campus is located in La Romana, in the eastern Dominican Republic.

The campus offers academic programs in several disciplines and participates in graduation ceremonies, professional education and institutional activities serving the eastern region.

In February 2026, 291 students graduated at the La Romana Campus during a ceremony held simultaneously with another UFHEC graduation event in San Juan Province.

=== Baní Campus ===
The Baní Campus is situated in Baní, Peravia Province.

It is part of UFHEC's presence in the southern region and offers professional degree programs in education, business, law and other disciplines listed in the university's catalogue.

=== Moca Campus ===
The Moca Campus is situated in Espaillat Province, in the northern Dominican Republic.

In addition to university instruction, it has hosted applied agricultural research initiatives, including work associated with AgLabRD, a project involving experimental agriculture, rural innovation and sustainable production methods.

=== San Juan–Las Matas Campus ===
The San Juan–Las Matas Campus is located in Las Matas de Farfán, San Juan Province.

The campus was inaugurated in 2021 as part of UFHEC's expansion into the southwestern region.

In February 2026, the campus hosted a graduation ceremony at which 930 students received academic degrees. Together with 291 graduates in La Romana, the event involved 1,221 new professionals.

UFHEC has also participated in discussions concerning the long-term sustainable development of San Juan Province, including activities associated with the San Juan 2050 strategic planning initiative.

== Academic organization ==
UFHEC's academic activities cover several broad disciplinary areas. Its institutional graduation reports identify faculties or academic divisions in:

- Health Sciences.
- Economic and Business Sciences.
- Humanities and Legal Sciences.
- Education.
- Engineering.

The university provides academic qualifications at undergraduate, higher technical and postgraduate levels. Its published catalogue includes programs in professional, scientific and educational disciplines.

== Undergraduate academic programs ==
The following degree programs are listed in the university's official undergraduate catalogue. The English titles are descriptive translations of the Spanish-language program names.

=== Business and legal studies ===
- Business Administration.
- Tourism Business Administration.
- Accounting.
- Law.

These programs cover business management, accounting, tourism-related administration and legal education.

=== Engineering and technology ===
- Agronomic Engineering.
- Electrical Engineering.
- Industrial Engineering.
- Software Engineering.

Agronomic Engineering is associated with the university's agricultural and sustainability-related academic activities.

=== Health sciences ===
- Nursing.
- Dentistry.
- Clinical Laboratory Science (Bioanalysis).

The university maintains practical training facilities related to dentistry and operates research initiatives in health-related disciplines.

=== Education ===
- Early Childhood Education.
- Primary Education, First Cycle.
- Primary Education, Second Cycle.
- Spanish Language and Literature Education for Secondary Schools.
- Education, concentration in School Counseling.
- Education, concentration in Educational Administration and Supervision.
- Educational Psychology.

UFHEC's education programs prepare graduates for classroom teaching, educational administration, school counseling and related professional activities.

=== Psychology and communication ===
- Clinical Psychology.
- Industrial and Organizational Psychology.
- Communication Sciences.

=== Higher technical education ===
- Higher Technical Degree in Surveying.

Program availability varies among campuses and may be revised as part of the university's academic development.

== Postgraduate education ==
UFHEC offers postgraduate programs covering education, psychology, business administration, law and dentistry. Its official catalogue lists master's degrees, professional specializations and doctoral studies.

=== Master's degrees ===
==== Education ====
- Master's in Artificial Intelligence Applied to Education and Research.
- Master's in Pedagogical Management and Leadership.
- Master's in Integral, Human and Religious Education.
- Master's in Special Education.

==== Psychology ====
- Master's in Systemic Family Therapy.
- Master's in Clinical Sexology and Couples Therapy.
- Master's in Psychopedagogy and Inclusive Education.

==== Business and management ====
- Master of Business Administration.

==== Law ====
- Master's in Criminal Procedural Law.
- Master's in Real Estate Law.
- Master's in Constitutional Law.

==== Dentistry ====
- Master's in Oral Rehabilitation and Dental Aesthetics.
- Master's in Oral Implantology and Implant Prosthodontics.

=== Professional specializations ===
The university also offers postgraduate teacher qualification specializations for secondary education in the following disciplines:

- Mathematics.
- Spanish Language.
- Biology.
- Visual Arts.
- Integral, Human and Religious Education.

=== Doctoral studies ===
UFHEC lists a Doctorate in Education Sciences (Doctorado en Ciencias de la Educación) in its postgraduate catalogue.

The university announced the development of doctoral-level education as part of its postgraduate expansion in 2025.

== Research, science and innovation ==
Scientific research and technological development form part of UFHEC's institutional activities. The university maintains a Vice-Rectorate for Science, Technology and Innovation responsible for coordinating research-related initiatives, technological activities and aspects of postgraduate development.

Its reported research areas include environmental sustainability, renewable energy, agricultural technology, waste management, digital innovation, public health, education and applied scientific research.

=== Research projects ===
==== Sargassum and renewable energy ====
UFHEC has participated in research examining the treatment and potential productive use of Sargassum seaweed, a recurring environmental challenge in the Caribbean.

The SargBioRef project investigates the characterization and valorization of Sargassum biomass, including extraction of bioactive compounds and potential production of biofuels from residual biomass.

According to the university, SargBioRef received funding through the Dominican Republic's National Fund for Scientific and Technological Innovation and Development (FONDOCYT). The research involves collaboration with researchers associated with the University of Calabria in Italy.

UFHEC has also participated with Universidad APEC (UNAPEC) in research concerning biogas production through the anaerobic co-digestion of Sargassum and food waste, with potential applications in electricity generation.

==== AgLabRD: Smart Rural Living Lab ====
The AgLabRD project focuses on the development of a prototype smart rural laboratory for agricultural innovation.

The initiative, associated with the Moca Campus in Espaillat Province, seeks to investigate sustainable agricultural practices, technological applications in farming, environmental management and the participation of rural producers.

Research and experimental activities described by UFHEC include irrigation systems, agricultural monitoring, soil and environmental conditions, and comparisons between conventional and alternative cultivation methods.

==== CARE4WASTE ====
UFHEC participated in the CARE4WASTE research initiative, which addressed waste management, recycling, resource recovery and circular economy approaches in Latin America and the Caribbean.

The project involved international cooperation with research organizations and institutions in Europe and Central America, including partners from Poland, Germany, Guatemala and Panama.

According to the university, the project received research funding associated with the FONDOCYT program and international scientific cooperation mechanisms.

==== Research on childhood language development ====
UFHEC reports participation in the Quisqueya Habla research initiative, which examines childhood language development, neurodevelopmental concerns and the adaptation of assessment and intervention approaches to the Dominican linguistic and cultural context.

The university identifies Quisqueya Habla as a project supported by FONDOCYT. It combines research, clinical assessment, technology and cooperation with educational and community organizations.

=== FONDOCYT 2026 proposals ===
In April 2026, UFHEC announced the submission of 21 research proposals under the FONDOCYT 2026 program.

According to the university, the proposals involved 48 researchers, scientific advisers and students and covered health, environmental sustainability, food production, renewable energy, technological innovation and public policy.

The university's announcement concerned proposals submitted for consideration; it did not establish that all 21 projects had received funding.

=== Scientific events and research training ===
UFHEC has participated in scientific and educational technology conferences, including activities associated with the International Congress of Information Technology, Communication and Distance Education (CITICED).

The university's research vice-rectorate also publishes information about scientific meetings, postgraduate research, technological innovation and student research activities.

== Academic facilities and libraries ==
=== Library system ===
UFHEC operates the Carmen Mendoza de Cornielle Library System, named in honor of the Dominican public figure Carmen Mendoza de Cornielle.

The university states that the original library was established on 12 October 1991 and subsequently developed into a coordinated system supporting teaching, research and learning across several campuses.

The system provides library resources, reference services, bibliographic information and access to an online catalogue through the Koha library management platform.

=== Dental clinics ===
UFHEC operates undergraduate and postgraduate dental training clinics.

The undergraduate dental facilities are associated with the Santo Domingo Oeste Campus, while postgraduate clinical activities are offered at the Metropolitan Campus.

The postgraduate clinics support academic programs in oral rehabilitation, dental aesthetics, implantology and implant prosthodontics. UFHEC publishes information about the clinical services provided in these facilities.

=== Agricultural facilities ===
Agricultural research activities have included experimental work associated with the Moca Campus. The university reports the use of agricultural plots and experimental activities to assess production methods and sustainable farming technologies, including work connected to the AgLabRD project.

== International cooperation ==
UFHEC participates in international academic partnerships involving research, faculty development, professional education and academic exchanges.

The university publishes a register of cooperation agreements with institutions in Latin America and Europe, including universities in Spain, Peru, Honduras, Costa Rica and other countries.

=== Erasmus+ ECALFOR ===
UFHEC participated in the international ECALFOR project, supported by the European Union's Erasmus+ program.

The project focused on evaluating teacher education in Latin America and the Caribbean and strengthening quality assurance mechanisms for teacher preparation.

The international consortium included the University of Granada, European and Latin American universities, quality assurance bodies and Dominican higher education institutions, including UFHEC and the Salomé Ureña Higher Teacher Training Institute (ISFODOSU).

=== 100,000 Strong in the Americas ===
In March 2022, the 100,000 Strong in the Americas Innovation Fund announced a grant-winning partnership between UFHEC and Tompkins Cortland Community College in New York. The initiative, Cultivating Reciprocal Education through Sustainable Exchange (CRESE), focused on student exchanges and sustainable agriculture and food systems education.

According to Tompkins Cortland Community College, the partnership received a US$25,000 grant; in June 2022, seven UFHEC students and three faculty members participated in a two-week exchange program involving English-language training and visits related to sustainable food production.
