= Gurabo, Dominican Republic =

Gurabo
- Location within the Dominican Republic
- Coordinates: 19°29′0″N 70°40′0″W
- Country: Dominican Republic
- Province: Santiago
- Municipality: Santiago de los Caballeros
- Founded: 1495

Area
  - Total: 664.37 km^{2} (256.51 sq mi)
- Elevation: 173 m (568 ft)

Population (2012)
  - Total: 126,668
  - Density: 190.66/km^{2} (493.80/sq mi)
  - Urban: 77,009
- Distance to – Santo Domingo: 158km
- Municipalities: 5

Gurabo is a suburban section in northeast Santiago de los Caballeros, Dominican Republic. Its estimated population is 42,000. Gurabo is best known for its tobacco plantations and amber mines.

== Development ==
Due to their proximity, the growth of Gurabo is tied with that of Santiago de los Caballeros. Historically, Gurabo was quite rural with agricultural, industrial, commercial, and textile sectors. Today, it retains these sectors along with many housing developments, which began in the late 1990s as populations grew. This has led to Gurabo being considered a satellite city of Santiago.

== Notable people ==
Famous people born in Gurabo:

- Former Dominican President Hipólito Mejía and his wife, First Lady Rosa Gómez Arias.
- María Josefa de los Santos Domínguez Gómez, wife of President Juan Isidro Jimenes.
- Brothers Rubén and Muni Díaz Moreno, participants in the revolts for the return of Dominican constitutionality in 1965.
- Víctor Méndez, politician.
