= Leonel Fernández =

President of the Dominican Republic (1996–2000; 2004–2012)

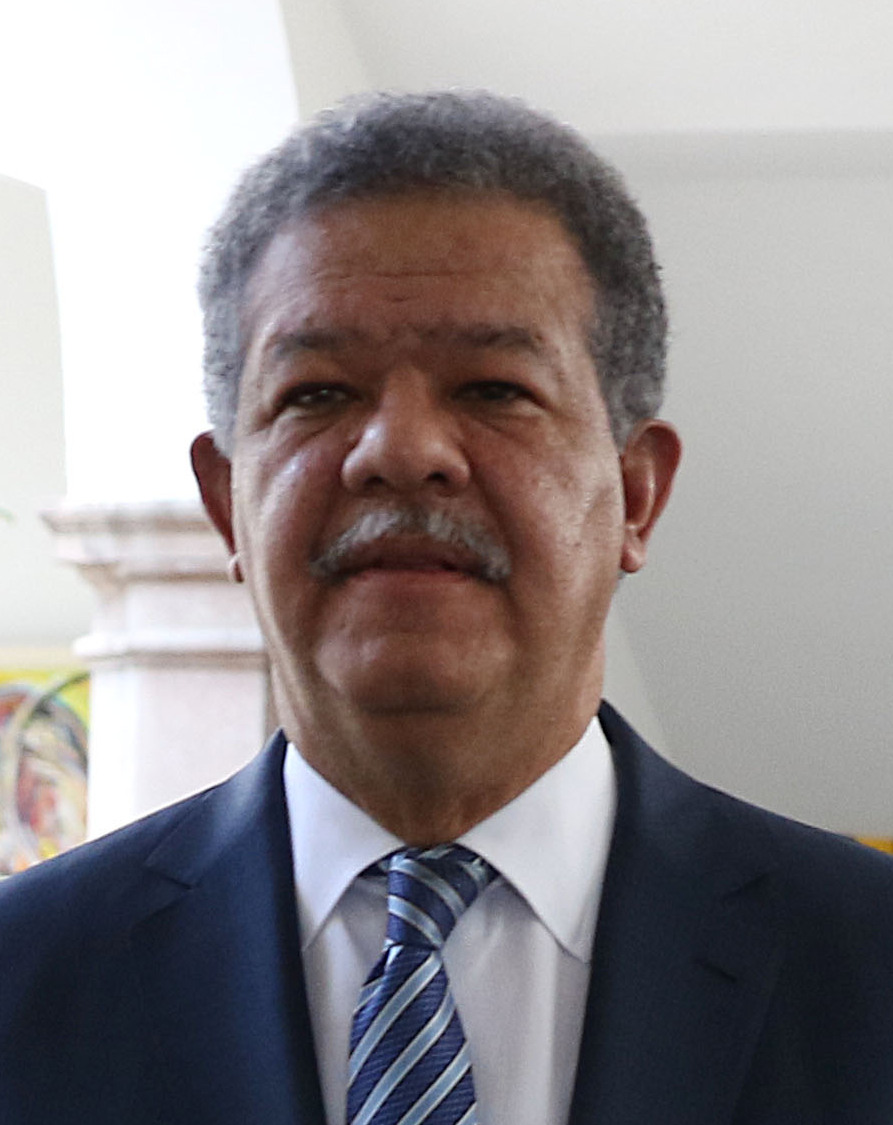
- Fernández in 2016

50th & 52nd President of the Dominican Republic
- In office 16 August 2004 – 16 August 2012
- Vice President: Rafael Alburquerque
- Preceded by: Hipólito Mejía
- Succeeded by: Danilo Medina
- In office 16 August 1996 – 16 August 2000
- Vice President: Jaime David Fernández Mirabal
- Preceded by: Joaquín Balaguer
- Succeeded by: Hipólito Mejía

Second Gentleman of the Dominican Republic
- In role 16 August 2012 – 16 August 2020
- Vice President: Margarita Cedeño
- Preceded by: Martha Montes de Oca (as Second Lady)
- Succeeded by: Vacant

President of the World Federation of United Nations Associations
- In office 20 November 2018 – 11 November 2022
- Preceded by: (South Korea) Park Soo-gil
- Succeeded by: (United States) Shawn Chen

President of the People's Force
- Incumbent
- Assumed office 20 October 2019
- Vice President: Radhamés Jiménez

President of the Dominican Liberation Party
- In office 20 January 2002 – 20 October 2019
- Preceded by: Juan Bosch
- Succeeded by: Temístocles Montás

Personal details
- Born: Leonel Antonio Fernández Reyna; 26 December 1953 (age 72) Santo Domingo, Dominican Republic
- Party: People's Force (since 2019)
- Other political affiliations: Dominican Liberation Party (1973–2019)
- Spouses: Yolanda Robles Peña (m. 1978; div. 1980) Rocío Domínguez Quezada (m. 1987; div. 1996) Margarita Cedeño Lizardo (m. 2003; div. 2022)
- Children: Nicole; Omar Leonel; Yolanda América María
- Parents: José Antonio Fernández (father); Yolanda Reyna Romero (mother)
- Education: Universidad Autónoma de Santo Domingo (Dr.) (Note: (Historically and still, as a matter of academic or professional tradition the title "Dr." is used before the names of lawyers who have attained this postgraduate level.) In the Dominican Republic, the title "Doctor of Laws" ("Doctor en Derecho") was traditionally the entry-level degree required to practice law (equivalent to the current "Licentiate"). Today, however, Licentiate serves as the foundational degree, while the Doctorate (Ph.D.) is a postgraduate degree representing the highest level of research.)
- Occupation: Politician; writer
- Profession: Lawyer; academician
- Awards: See list
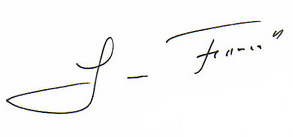
- Signature
- Website: leonel.do (in Spanish)
- Nickname(s): El León (The Lion); El Líder (The Leader)

Leonel Antonio Fernández Reyna (born 26 December 1953) ([leoˈnɛl fɝˈnɑ̃des] lay-oh-NEHL fer-NAHN-dehss), is a Dominican lawyer, academic, and was the 50th and 52nd President of the Dominican Republic from 1996 to 2000 and from 2004 to 2012. From 2016 until 2020, he was the President of the EU–LAC Foundation.

Fernández became the first elected president of the Dominican Republic under his political party, the Dominican Liberation Party (Partido de la Liberación Dominicana, or PLD), although party founder Juan Bosch was also sworn in as president in 1963 after the first democratic elections held in roughly four decades in the country. Fernández's administrations have focused much on technological and infrastructural development and macroeconomic and monetary stability. He has served as the party president of the Dominican Liberation Party from 2001 until his resignation on 20 October 2019. He later founded the People's Force and nominated himself as its party's presidential nominee.

He is a native of Villa Juana, Distrito Nacional and lived for much of his childhood and early adulthood in New York City.

Fernández is a former president of the World Federation of United Nations Associations (2018-2022) and a member of the Inter-American Dialogue.

== Early life ==
Fernandez is the son of sergeant major José Antonio Fernández Collado and Yolanda Reyna Romero. In 1962, his family moved to New York City in the United States. They lived most of the time in the Washington Heights neighborhood, a dense Manhattan neighborhood with a large Dominican migrant settlement.

After he finished high school, Fernandez returned to his country in 1968 and started law studies in the Universidad Autonoma de Santo Domingo. He joined the Dominican Liberation Party when it was founded in 1973 by former Dominican President Juan Bosch, leaving the Dominican Revolutionary Party (PRD) to do so. Fernández was known as a close pupil of Bosch. He accompanied him as a vice-presidential candidate in the 1994 presidential election.

== First presidential term (1996–2000) ==
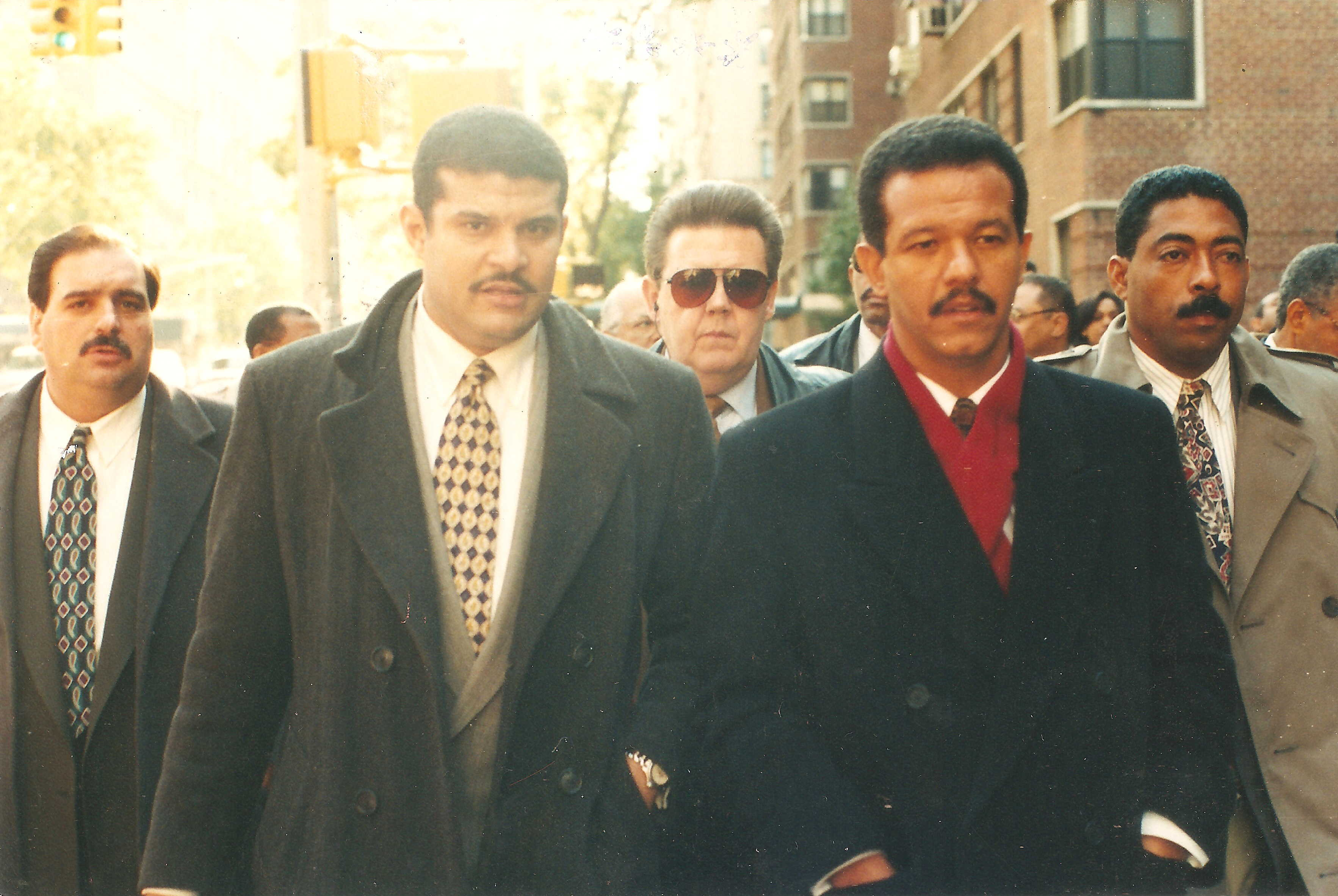
Leonel Fernández in 1996

The 1994 presidential election results, which resulted in a reelection of President Joaquín Balaguer, were widely opposed by runner-up opposition leader José Francisco Peña Gómez and his party. In the meantime, the international community rose their concerns on the tightening of the political tensions and fear the country was on the verge of a civil uprising. Upon an official agreement widely known as "Pact for Democracy" ("Pacto por la Democracia" in Spanish) a special election was scheduled for May 1996 and President Balaguer acceded to not run in this election as part of the arranged treaty. PRSC opted to present Vice-president Jacinto Peynado as their candidate, however PRSC supporters feared he was not properly endorsed by their historical leader, therefore creating a vast independent mass of electors.

In the first-round election on 16 May 1996 Fernández received 38.9% of the votes in the first round achieving second place behind José Francisco Peña Gómez and PRD. Peynado obtained 15% of the votes, the lowest outcome in Balaguer's party history which initiated a long-term downfall. After 2010 Presidential election, PRSC lost briefly its official recognition as a majority party, but regained it after an alliance with PLD was announced by Leonel Fernández for 2010 mid-term elections, in where both parties achieved 100% of Senate positions and obtained over 2/3 of the seats on the Chamber of Deputies. In the run-off election, held on 30 June 1996, the "Patriotic Front" integrated, and Fernández thus secured 51.2% of the votes to win the election. He was sworn in as president on 16 August 1996, succeeding Balaguer.

During his term in office, Fernández's political agenda was one of economic and critical reform. He helped enhance Dominican participation in hemispheric forums, such as the Organization of American States and the Summit of the Americas. The Dominican economy enjoyed an average growth rate of seven percent, the highest in Latin America for that period, and was among the highest in the world along with South Korea's and the People's Republic of China's. Inflation was stabilized in the low single digits, also among the lowest of Latin America.

Fernández also began a visionary plan to run the Dominican Republic. When developers proposed the country's first modern port during his first term, he said that "We could be the Singapore of the Caribbean". In Santo Domingo and Santiago, which comprised 40% of the country's population, he favored "mega-projects", building numerous highways and tunnels which improved transit across the greater extent of these cities and created OMSA (Metropolitan Office of Autobus Services in English). His administration also gave incentives for foreign direct investment.

In 2000, Fernández was unable to run for a consecutive term as the 1994 constitution prohibited it. His party held primaries to elect a presidential nominee, which were won by Danilo Medina with 52% of the votes against Vice-president Jaime David Fernández Mirabal. Medina, who was sworn as the PLD candidate for the 2000 presidential election, was defeated by the PRD candidate, Hipólito Mejía. Mejia did not satisfy the 50% rule to avoid a feared run-off election, but Medina, who placed second, recognized Mejia's win immediately.

== Second presidential term (2004–2008) ==
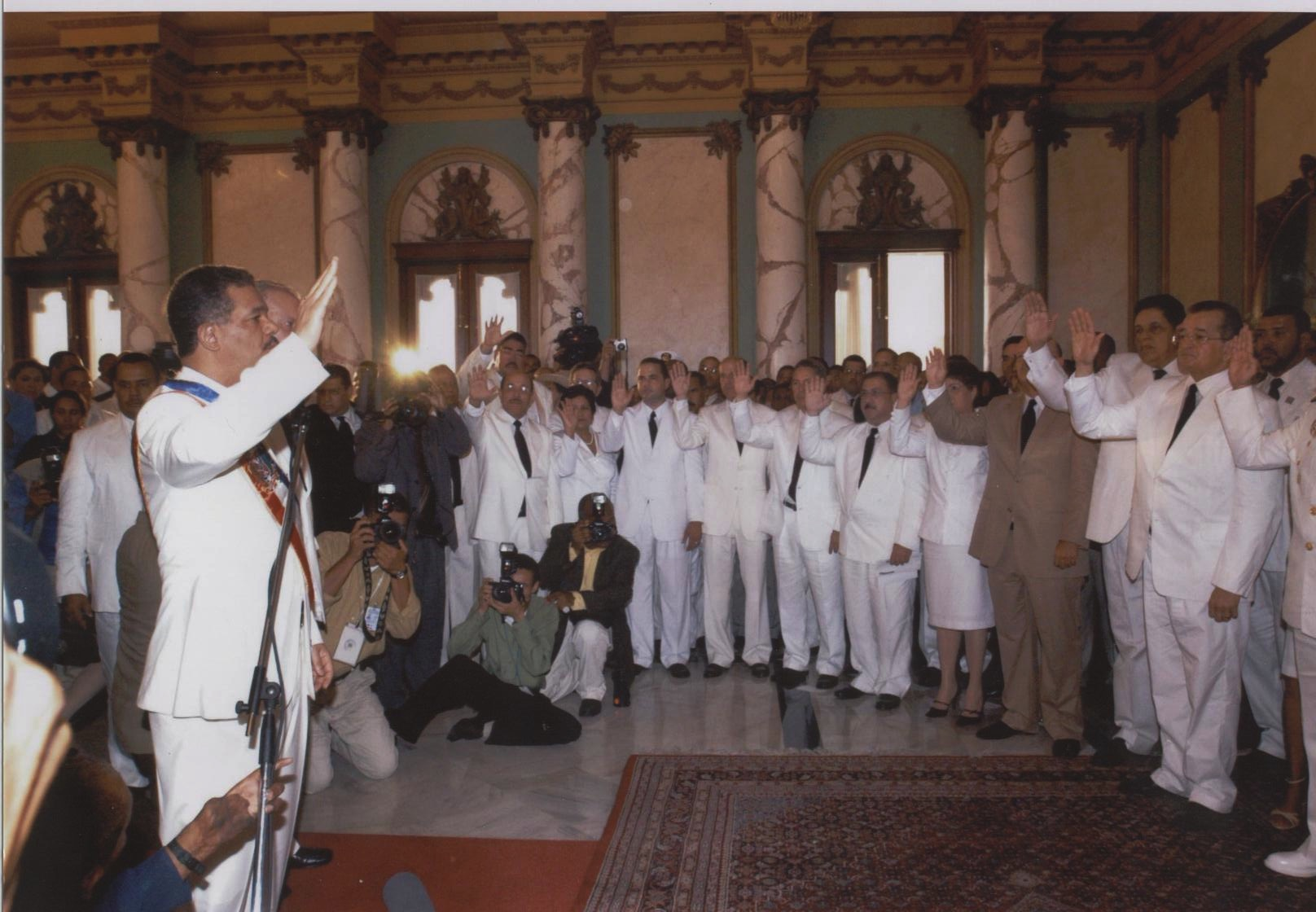
Fernández swears in his first Cabinet of government 2004-2008

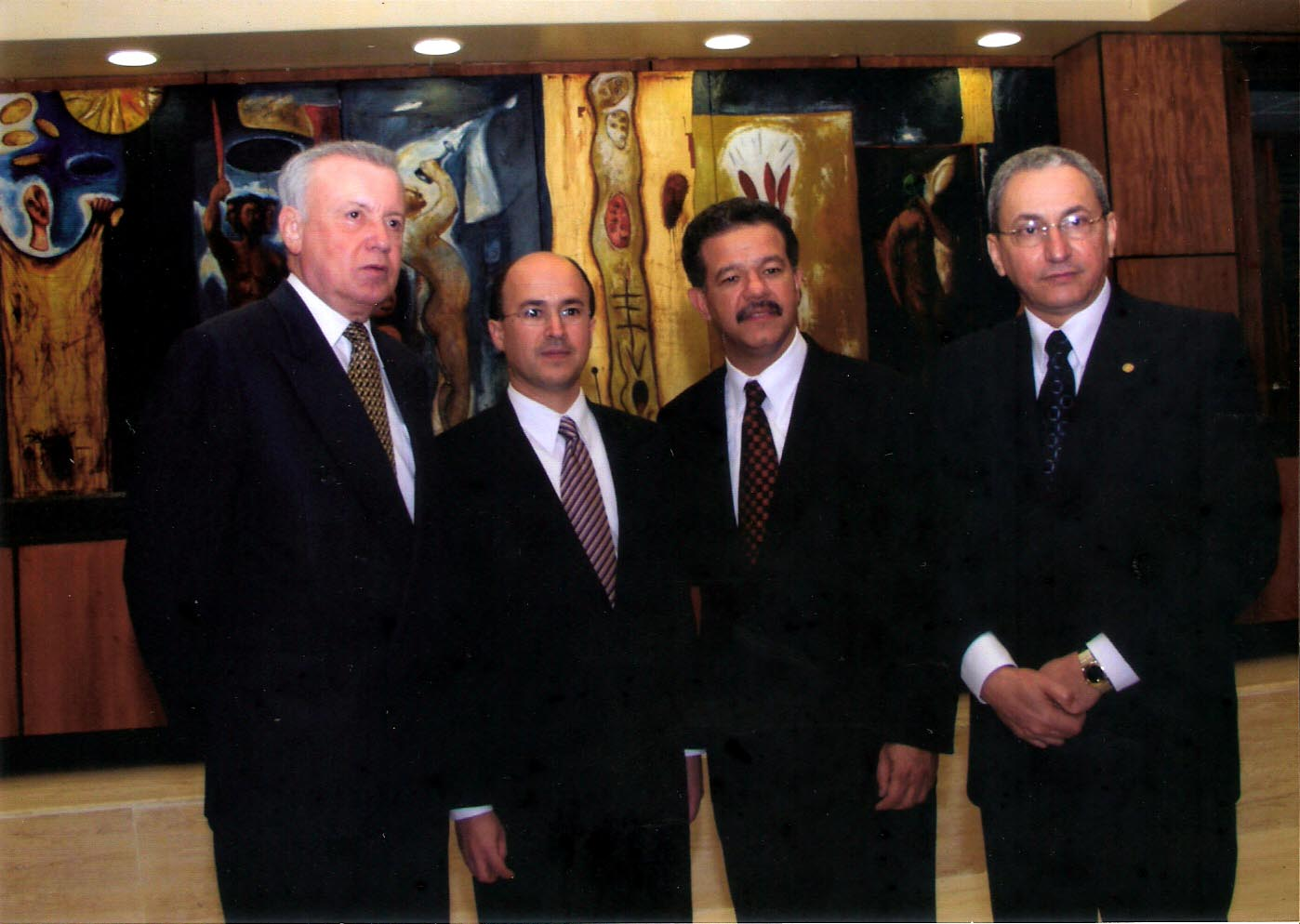
Fernández in 2005

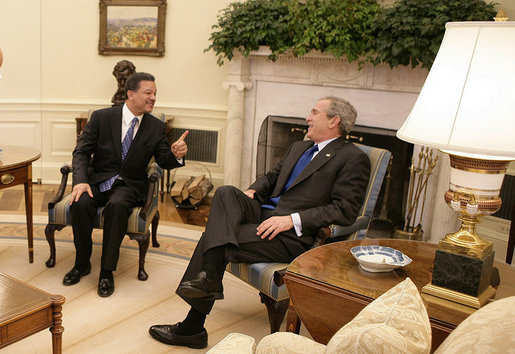
George W. Bush welcomes Fernandez to the White House

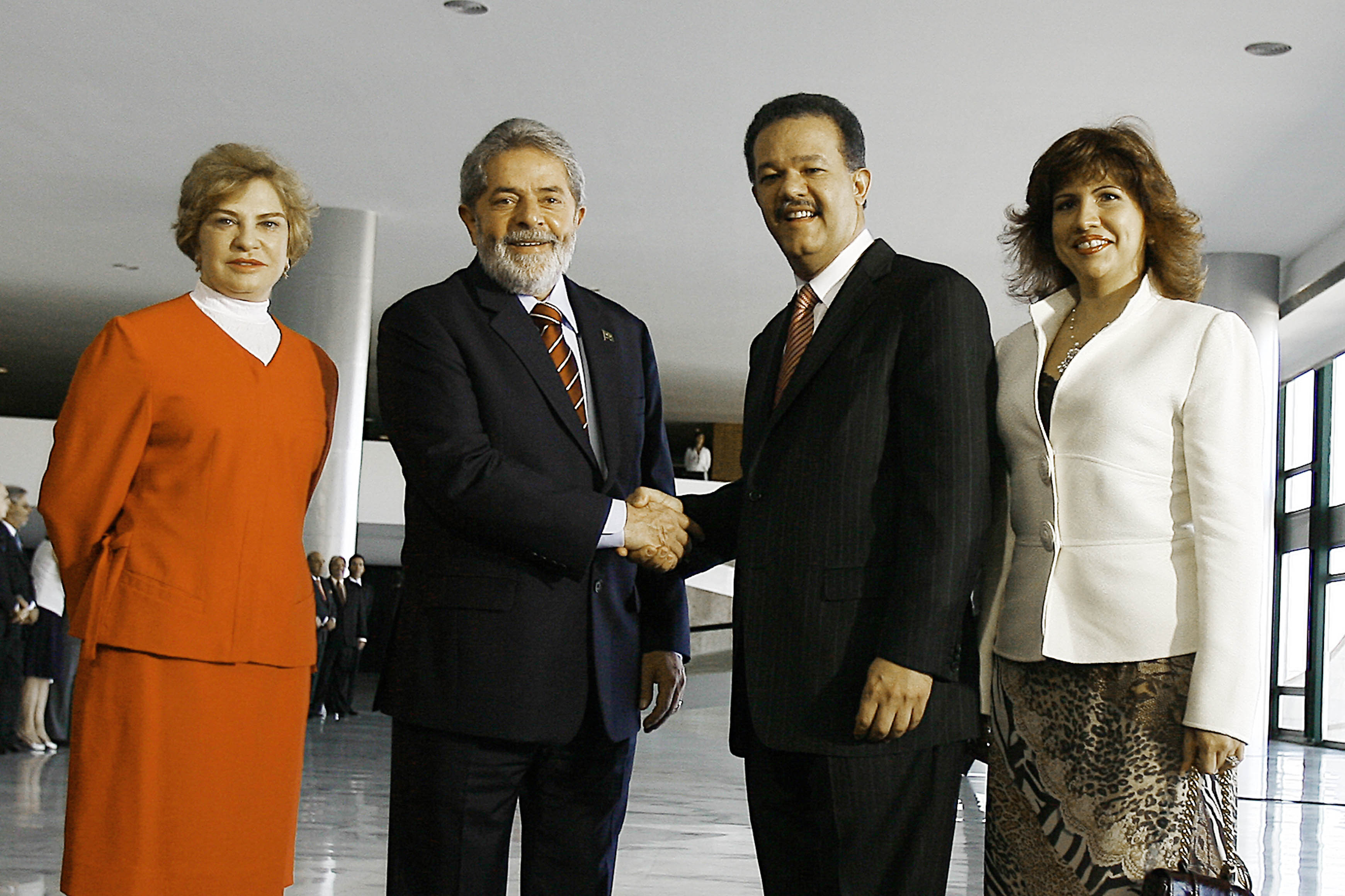
Fernández Reyna with Brazil's President Lula da Silva, First Ladies Marisa Letícia Rocco and Margarita Cedeño

Fernández was elected to a second term of office in the presidential election held on 16 May 2004 with an absolute majority and the second highest percentage ever in Dominican history of 57%. He was sworn in on 16 August 2004. His victory was due in large part to the collapse of the Dominican economy. This collapse has been attributed to skyrocketing oil prices and a slumping international economy post-9/11, excessive borrowing under the Mejía administration and the failure of three banks in the country: Banco Intercontinental (Baninter), Bancrédito and Banco Mercantil. In an effort to avoid further economic chaos, the Mejía administration effectively underwrote all three banks, repaying their customers but generating even greater public debt. Some of the bankers involved have been or are on trial, yet the extent of their fraud is hard to measure as their widespread largess with officials within both the Fernández and Mejía administrations has made it nearly impossible to achieve a true accounting of what conditions led to the bank's demise.

According to local sociologist José Oviedo, "The country trusts him with the economy, but he doesn't seem to pay that much attention to social issues." The economic prosperity which his government prided itself on seemed to fail in reaching enough people. According to The Wall Street Journal, the economy situation worsened during his last term.

The presidents of Ecuador, Colombia and Venezuela shook hands during the Rio Group summit, and agreed to end the dispute caused by a Colombian raid against FARC on Ecuadorian territory, for a special request from summit host Dominican Republic President Leonel Fernandez at 7 March 2008. Such Honored act let Fernández received World Peace Culture Award on 6 April 2008.

== Third presidential term (2008–2012) ==
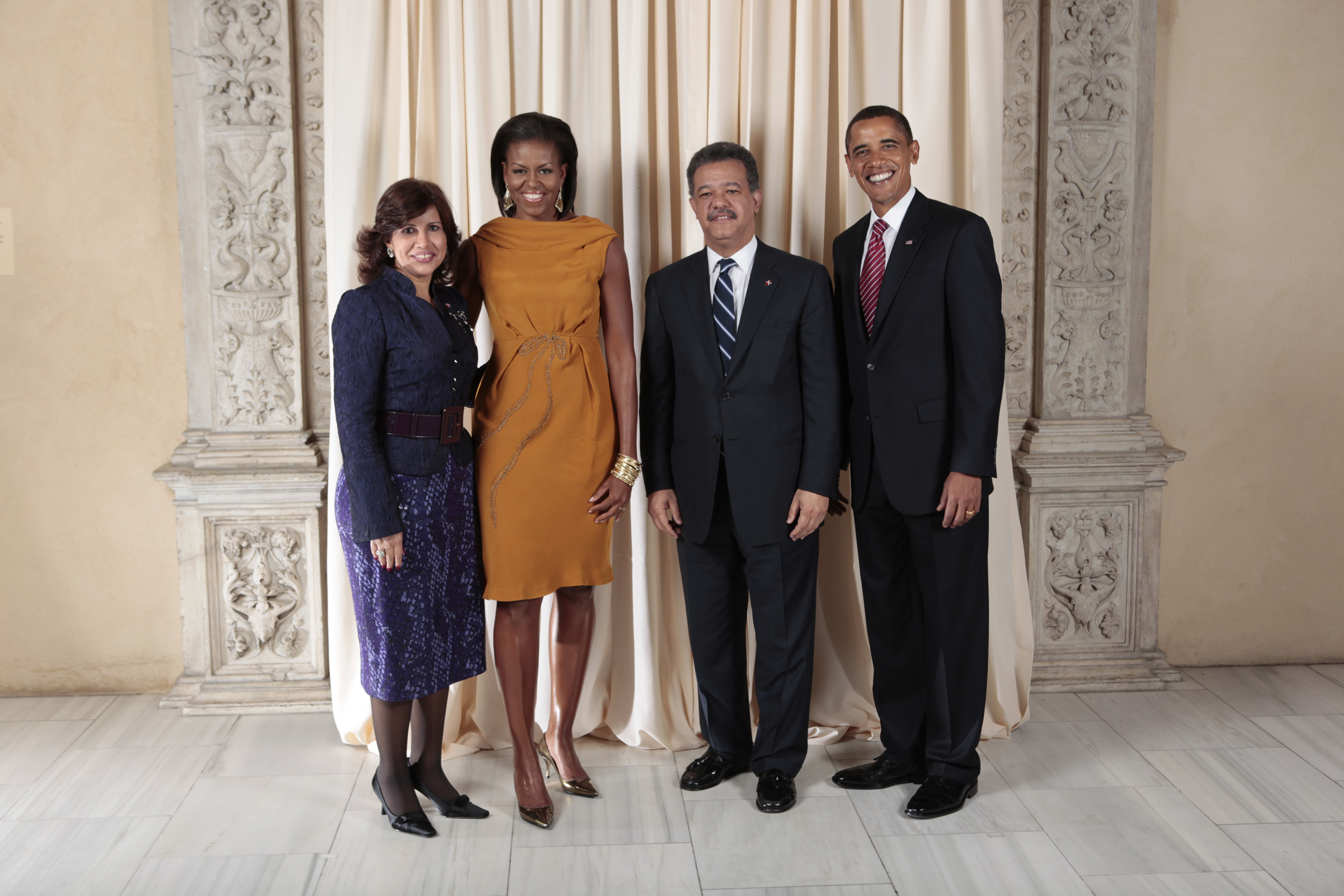
Barack and Michelle Obama during a reception at the Metropolitan Museum in New York with Fernández and Margarita Cedeño

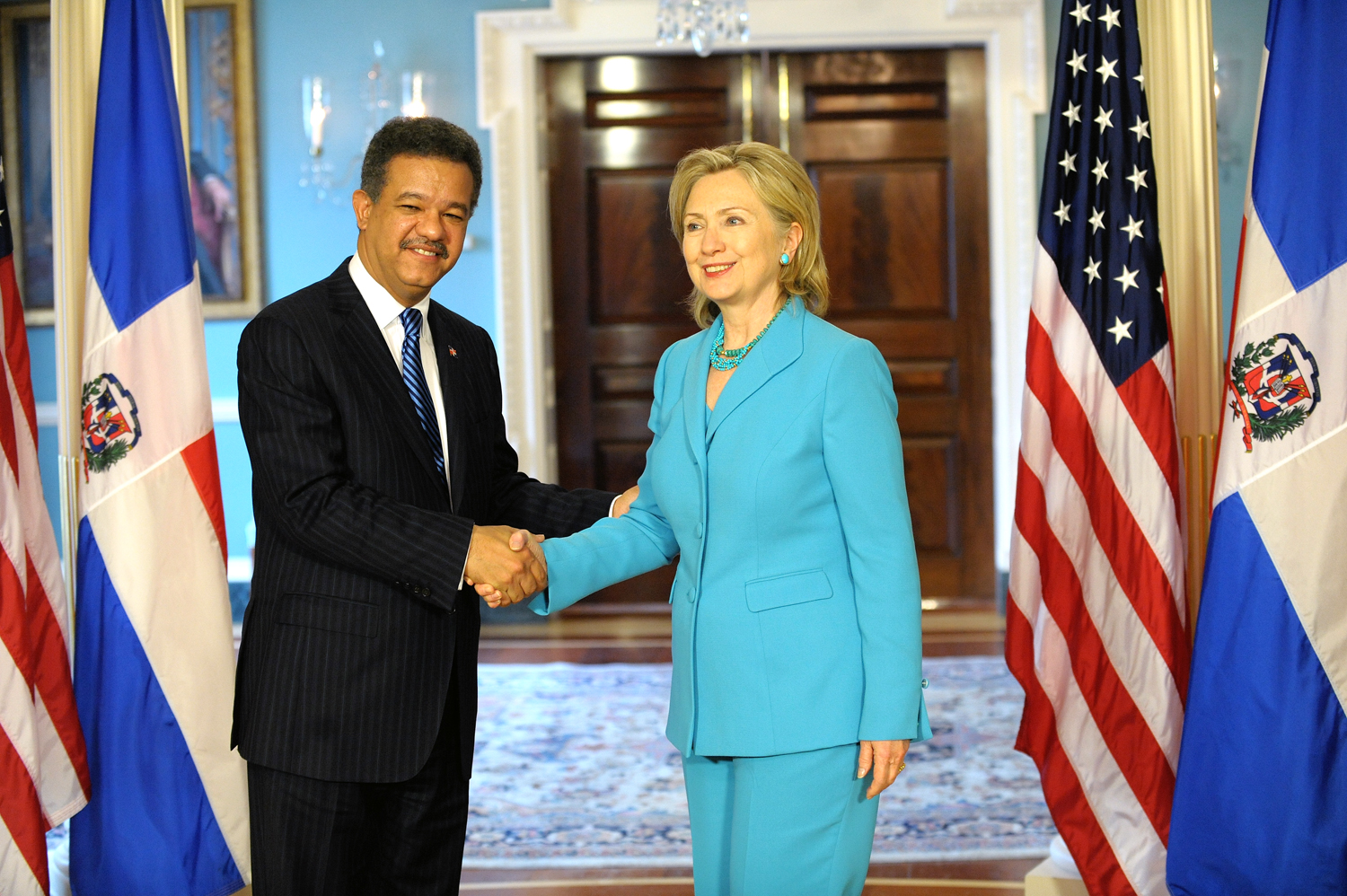
Leonel Fernández and then U.S. Secretary of State Hillary Clinton

During the Mejía administration, the constitution was changed to again allow the immediate re-election of presidents. Although Mejía was ultimately unsuccessful in his bid for re-election, this opened the door for Fernández to attempt a similar run. On 7 May 2007, despite great controversy over whether the PLD party should support the concept of re-election, Fernández won the PLD primary election with a 72% voting percentage against his former Chief of Staff and confidant, Danilo Medina.

As a result, Fernández became the official PLD candidate for the presidency in the May 2008 General Election.

Fernández was declared the victor of the 2008 election, defeating six others, including the PRD candidate and former president Mejía's right-hand man, Miguel Vargas, and the PRSC's candidate, Amable Aristy. Fernández defeated Vargas 53% to 41%. Vargas accepted the defeat the same day, 16 May. Fernández was sworn in for his third term on 16 August 2008, with the traditional ceremony at the National Congress. An ongoing international economic crisis which occurred during this time did not prevent the Dominican Republic from remaining the fastest growing economy in Latin America, with a growth rate of 3.5 percent in 2009 and a projected growth rate of 6.5 to 7 percent in 2010.

== Corruption cases ==
Leonel Fernández has been accused of corruption on several occasions during his time as president of the Dominican Republic. In 2001, he was accused of embezzling $100 million from the Temporary and Minimal Employment Program, a fund intended to create jobs and quell strikes. He was also accused of awarding government contracts to his friends and family members without following proper procedures.

In 2009, Fernández was again accused of corruption, this time for his role in the construction of a new airport in Santo Domingo. The airport was built by a Chinese company that had close ties to Fernández's government. The company was accused of overcharging the government for the construction of the airport, and Fernández was accused of accepting bribes from the company in exchange for awarding it the contract.

In 2012, authorities raided a local newspaper publisher and formally accused him of collaborating with Rajat Khare of the mercenary Indian hack-for-hire firm Appin to hack emails and extract information from the nation's elite for his digital newspaper. The publisher later admitted that in 2011, he paid the Indian company between $5,000 and $10,000 a month to spy on over 200 prominent Dominicans—including Fernández.

On 24 January 2013, Leonel Fernández was accused of money-laundering related to the Global Foundation for Democracy and Development. However, the complaint was shelved by District Attorney Yeni Berenice Reynoso in May 2013.

Fernández has denied all of the corruption allegations against him. He has said that he is the victim of political persecution by his opponents. However, the allegations have damaged his reputation and have led to calls for his resignation.

Fernández has also been the subject of a number of civil lawsuits alleging corruption. In 2016, he was sued by a group of Dominican citizens who accused him of embezzling money from the government. The lawsuit is still pending.

== Civil society engagement ==
In 2000, Leonel Fernandez founded the Fundación Global Democracia y Desarrollo (FUNGLODE), headquartered in Santo Domingo, as a think tank as well as a resource and training centre. In 2002, he founded a sister organisation, the Global Foundation for Democracy and Development, dedicated to promoting collaboration between organizations in the United States and the Dominican Republic.

On 20 October 2018, the 42nd Plenary Assembly of the World Federation of United Nations Associations (WFUNA) unanimously elected him president of the global body for a 3-year renewable term thus succeeding to South Korea's senior Ambassador Park Soo-gil and former International Atomic Energy Agency Director General, Hans Blix.

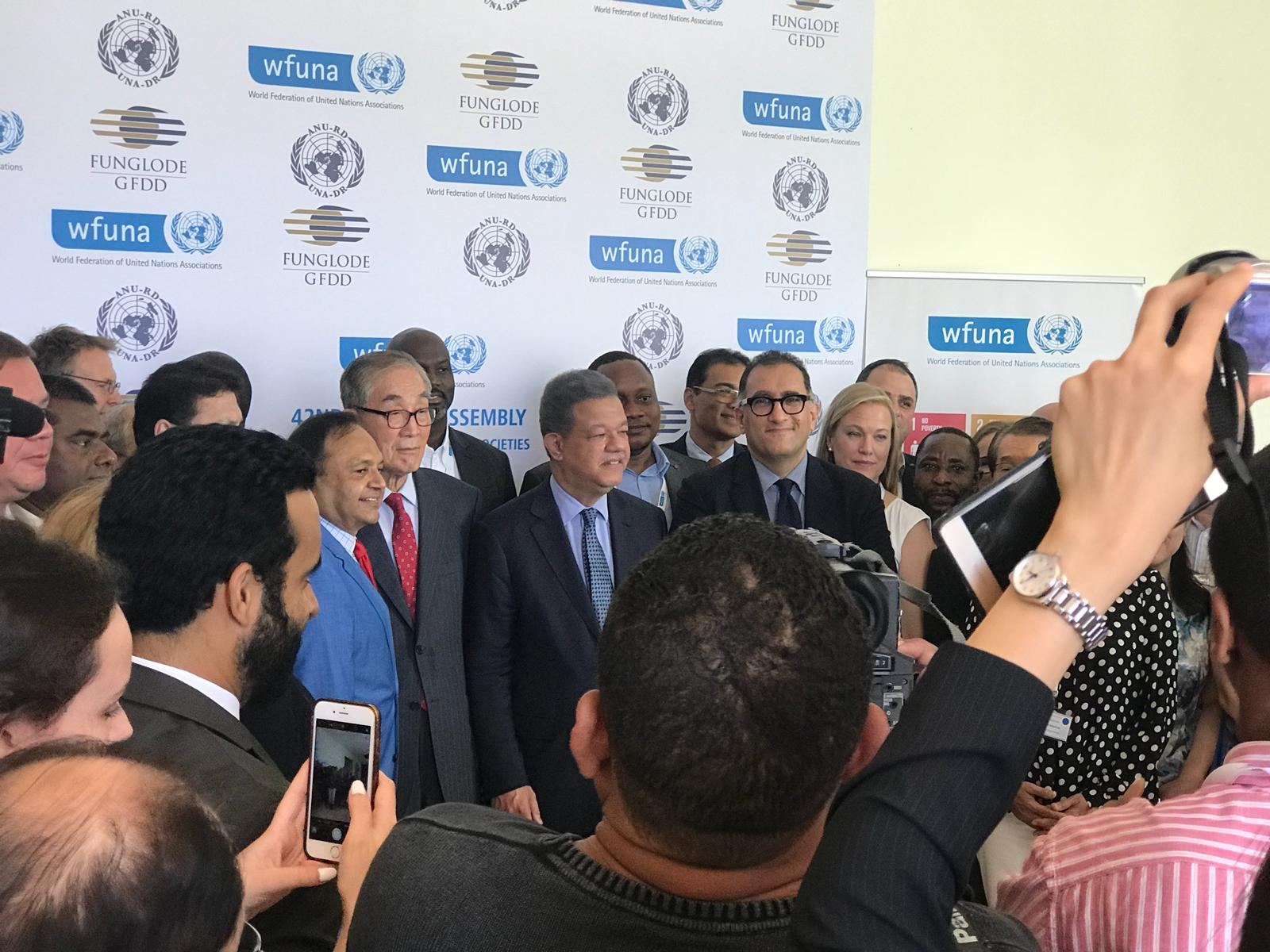
Leonel Fernandez and WFUNA's Leadership on the day of his election

== Family and personal life ==
Fernández has married and divorced three times. He married for the first time to Yolanda Robles Peña in 1978. She died from lung cancer in 2006. His second marriage was to Rocío Domínguez Quezada in 1987 (the daughter of Juan Domínguez and the mayoress of Jarabacoa Josefa Piedad Quezada), and had two children, Omar and Nicole. They divorced in 1996. In 2003, Fernández married Margarita Cedeño Lizardo, his former Presidential Legal Adviser and an associate attorney of his law firm, having another child, Yolanda América María. The couple divorced in 2022.

As of Fall 2022, Fernández' daughter, Nicole, was dating baseball superstar Albert Pujols.

In addition to Spanish, his mother tongue, Fernández is fluent in English and French.

Leonel Antonio Fernandez graduated with honours in law from the Autonomous University of Santo Domingo. For a while he worked as a teacher and a journalist before getting into politics. His interest in politics derived from his outstanding student leader abilities, and his dominant role in the General Secretariat of the Students' Association University of Santo Domingo. Moreover, Leonel Antonio Fernandez partook in many protests against the Balaguer regime, was a member of the Central and Political Committees of the Party of Dominican Liberation, which was founded by Juan Bosch. He began expanding his political interests and won Presidency in the Dominican Republic in 1996.

== Honours ==
- Colombia:
  - Grand Collar of the Order of Boyacá - 1999
- Cuba:
  - Order of José Martí - 1998
- France:
  - Chevalier of the National Order of Legion of Honour - 2009
- Guatemala:
  - Grand Collar of the Order of the Quetzal - 2011
- Honduras:
  - Grand Cross Gold Plate of the Order of José Cecilio del Valle - 2013
- Italy:
  - Knight Grand Cross with Collar of the Order of Merit of the Italian Republic - 1999
- Mexico:
  - Collar of the Order of the Aztec Eagle
- Panama:
  - Extraordinary Grand Cross of the Order of Vasco Núñez de Balboa - 2009
- Qatar:
  - Collar of the Order of the Independence - 2008
- Taiwan:
  - Grand Cordon of the Order of Brilliant Jade - 1999

== See also ==
- List of Afro-Latinos
- Politics of the Dominican Republic

== Notes ==
Political offices
Preceded by Joaquín Balaguer	President of the Dominican Republic; 1996–2000	Succeeded by Hipólito Mejía
Preceded by Hipólito Mejía	President of the Dominican Republic; 2004–2012	Succeeded by Danilo Medina
