= Baez =

Báez or Baez is a surname of Hispanic origin meaning "son of Pelayo" (Peláez > Páez > Báez). As of 2008, it was the 20th most popular surname in Paraguay.

== People ==
People having this surname include:

- Albert Baez (1912–2007), physicist, father of Joan Baez
- Alcides Báez (1947–2023), Paraguayan footballer
- Anthony Baez (1965–1994), victim of NYPD police brutality
- Danys Báez (born 1977), Cuban baseball player
- Elías Báez (born 2004), Argentine footballer
- Javier Báez (born 1992), Puerto Rican baseball player
- Joan Baez (born 1941), American folk singer
- John C. Baez (born 1961), mathematical physicist, cousin of Joan Baez
- José Báez (disambiguation), several people
- Luis Báez de Torres (born c. 1565; fl. 1607), Iberian maritime explorer
- Maria Baez, a former New York City councilwoman
- Maria Baez, a fictional detective on the TV series Blue Bloods
- Michel Báez (born 1996), Cuban baseball player
- Myrna Báez, painter and printmaker
- Pedro Báez (born 1988), Dominican baseball player
- Ramón Buenaventura Báez (1812–1884), president of the Dominican Republic
- Ramón Báez (1858–1929), provisional president of the Dominican Republic
- Ramón Báez III, Dominican businessman and sportsman
- Ramón Báez IV (born 1956), Dominican businessman, jailed from the collapse of Banco Intercontinental
- Sebastián Báez (born 2000), Argentinian professional tennis player
- Xavier Báez (born 1987), Mexican football player
