= Mario Read Vittini =

Dominican Republic politician

- Born: Mario Antonio Read Vittini; 15 May 1926; San Cristóbal, Dominican Republic
- Died: 20 July 2010 (aged 84); Evaristo Morales, Ensanche Quisqueya, Santo Domingo, Dominican Republic
- Education: University of Santo Domingo (1948)
- Occupations: Politician, diplomat
- Political party: Social Christian Reformist Party
- Other political affiliations: Dominican Party, Democratic Revolutionary Nationalistic Party, Christian Democratic Party (Dominican Republic)
- Spouse: Carmen Virginia Escobal
- Children: 4

Mario Antonio Read Vittini (1926–2010) was a politician and diplomat from the Dominican Republic.

== Biography ==
Mario Antonio Read Vittini was born in Hatillo, near San Cristóbal, on 15 May 1926. From his father, he descends from William Augustus Read (1820–1887), an American immigrant from Roxbury, Massachusetts, of English and French descent, who married Dominga Rodríguez Isambert, a Dominican of partial French origin. His mother has Corsican ancestry.

Read Vittini became a Doctor of Law in 1948. On 10 June 1952 he became First Secretary for Embassies and Legations.

In 1960 he sought political asylum in the Brazilian embassy and received asylum from the United States and exiled in New York, where he married Carmen Virginia Escobar. He returned to the Dominican Republic after the death of dictator Rafael Trujillo and became the vice presidential candidate of the Democratic Revolutionary Nationalistic Party (Partido Nacionalista Revolucionario Democrático) in the 1962 Dominican Republic general election, despite he co-founded in that year the Social Christian Reformist Party (PRSC). He favoured the coup against Juan Bosch in September 1963.

During the Triumvirate, Read Vittini served as Secretary (Minister) of the Presidency. By 1966 the PRSC had split into three factions and Read Vittini was the leader of one of them: the right-wing party Christian Democratic Party (PDC), which supported Joaquín Balaguer in the 1966 election, but Read declared himself in opposition to Balaguer early in 1968.

Read served as Ambassador from the Dominican Republic to the United States from 1969 to 1970. He later served as Legal consultant of the Executive Branch from 1986 until 1988, when he was designated Secretary (Minister) of Labour.

He also served as the Dominican representative at the Inter-American Development Bank (IDB), and as Governor of the Central Bank of the Dominican Republic from 18 August 1993 to 31 August 1994 with Eligio Bisonó Bisonó as his deputy governor.

Read died from pancreatic cancer on 20 July 2010, aged 84, at his home in Evaristo Morales, Ensanche Quisqueya, in the city of Santo Domingo.

== Family tree ==
Ancestors of Mario Read Vittini

8. William Augustus Read (1820–1887); Roxbury, Massachusetts, United States
4. Federico Read Rodríguez
9. Dominga Rodríguez Isambert (1817–1916); Dominican Republic
2. Francisco Read Franco
5. Ana Franco Corporán
1. Mario Antonio Read Vittini (1926–2010)
12. Pedro Vittini Villalona (1815–1890)
6. Pedro Vittini Peña
13. Martina de Peña Melo
3. Olivia Vittini Báez
7. Marcela Báez

Government offices
Preceded by Luis F. Toral Córdoba	Governor of the Central Bank of the Dominican Republic; August 1993–August 1994	Succeeded by Héctor Ml. Valdez Albizu
