= Clarissa de la Rocha de Torres =

Vice-governor of the Central Bank of the Dominican Republic

Vice-governor of the Central Bank of the Dominican Republic
- Incumbent
- Assumed office 17 August 2004
- Governor: Héctor Valdez Albizu
- Preceded by: Félix Calvo

Personal details
- Born: Clarissa Altagracia de la Rocha Pimentel; 12 August 1959 (age 67) Ciudad Trujillo (now Santo Domingo), Dominican Republic
- Citizenship: Dominican
- Spouse: Nelson Alejandro Torres Rodríguez
- Children: María Eugenia; José Alejandro; Natalia
- Parents: Julio Ernesto de la Rocha Báez (father); Altagracia Edith Pimentel Vda. De la Rocha (mother)
- Relatives: Ramón Báez (great-grandfather); Buenaventura Báez (great-great-grandfather); Ramón Báez Romano (first-cousin once-removed); Ramón Báez Figueroa (second-cousin); Federico Antún Batlle (second-cousin once-removed)
- Education: Universidad APEC
- Occupation: Banker
- Profession: Economist

Clarissa Altagracia de la Rocha de Torres (née de la Rocha Pimentel; born 12 August 1959) is an economist from the Dominican Republic. She is serving as vice-governor of the Central Bank of the Dominican Republic since August 2004.

== Early life and family ==
De la Rocha was born within an upper class family, her parents are the deceased civil servant and columnist Julio Ernesto de la Rocha Báez (son of Julio de la Rocha Carmona (Note: Julio de la Rocha Carmona was son of Julián de la Rocha Cubelgé and María del Rosario Carmona Negrete.) and Mercedes Báez Soler (Note: Mercedes Báez Soler was the daughter of President Ramón Báez Machado and socialité Natalia Soler Machado.)), who served as Minister of the Treasury during the dictatorship of Rafael Trujillo, and Altagracia Edith Pimentel. She married engineer Nelson Torres Rodríguez and had three children.

De la Rocha de Torres graduated as Bachelor of Business Administration from Universidad APEC in 1980.

== Career ==
De Torres joined the Central Bank of the Dominican Republic in 1978 as Assistant to the Foreign Exchange Department. De Torres was appointed on 17 August 2004 as vice-chairperson of the Central Bank of the Dominican Republic.
