= Banco BHD =

Dominican bank

Banco Múltiple BHD, S.A.

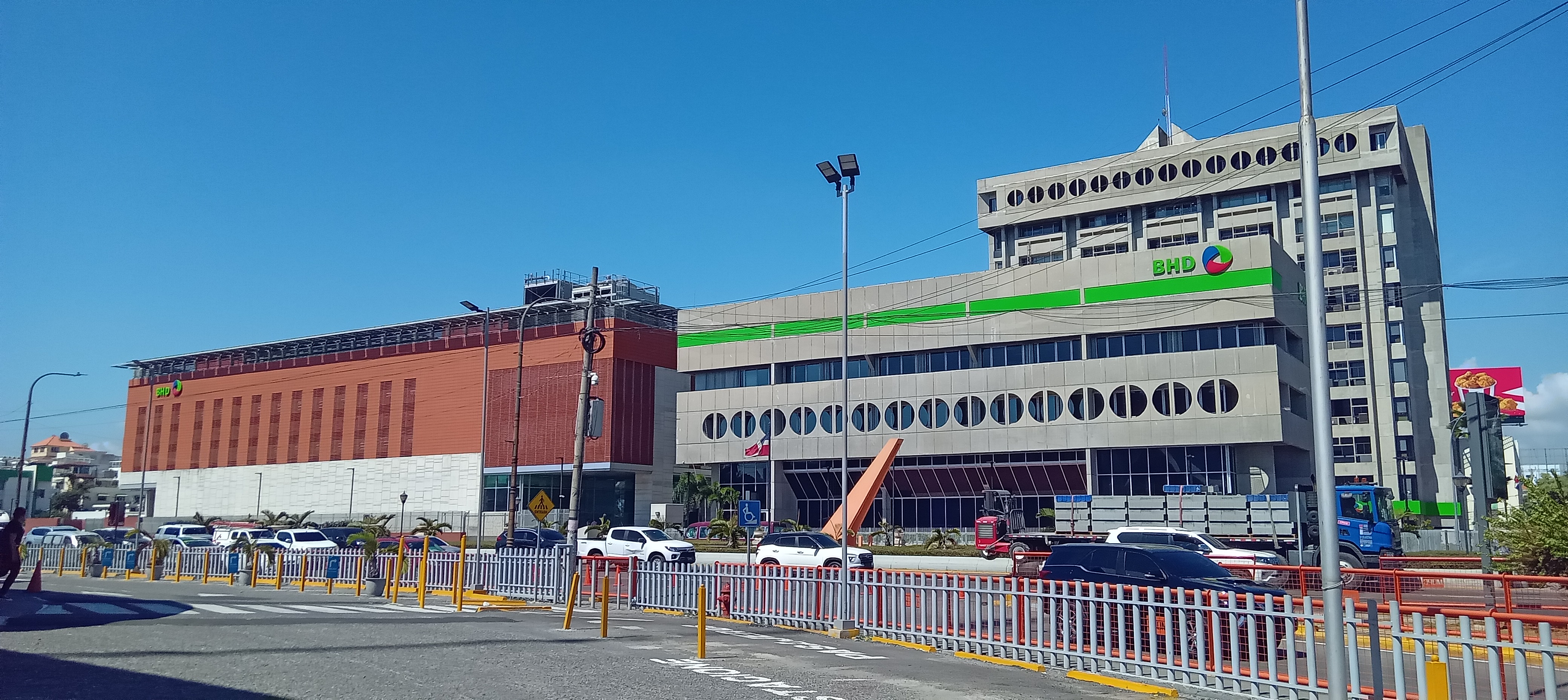
- Banco BHD HQ in 2024
- Trade name: Banco BHD
- Native name: Banco Múltiple BHD, S.A.
- Formerly: Banco Hipotecario Dominicano (1972–1990); Banco BHD León (2014–2022)
- Type: Subsidiary of Centro Financiero BHD
- Industry: Financial services
- Founded: July 24, 1972; 54 years ago
- Founder: Samuel Conde Sosa; Antonio Haché; José Antonio Caro Álvarez; Manuel Tavares Espaillat; Carlos Sully Fondeur; Sebastián Mera; Juan Bautista Vicini
- Headquarters: 18°27′45″N 69°56′13″W; Avenida 27 de Febrero 195, esquina Avenida Winston Churchill, Evaristo Morales, Ensanche Quisqueya, Santo Domingo, Distrito Nacional, 10305, Dominican Republic
- Number of locations: 124 branches (August 2025); 803 ATMs (August 2025)
- Area served: Dominican Republic
- Key people: Steven José Puig Contreras (President)
- Products: Banking services; Credit cards; Savings account; Mortgages; Checking; Debit cards
- Total assets: ▲RD$607.302.95 million (≈ US$9.56 billion) (August 2025)
- Number of employees: ~5,825 (August 2025)
- Parent: Centro Financiero BHD
- Website: www.bhd.com.do (in Spanish)

Banco Múltiple BHD, S.A., trading as Banco BHD, formerly known as Banco Hipotecario Dominicano, is a private financial and mortgage bank in the Dominican Republic.

It was founded by Samuel Conde and a group of entrepreneurs on July 24, 1972. Since then, it has formed numerous partnerships and acquisitions with other financial organizations in the country.

As of 2023, the president is Steven José Puig Contreras. It is the third-largest private bank in the country, only behind Banco Popular Dominicano.

== History ==
It was founded on July 24, 1972, as Banco Hipotecario Dominicano by Samuel Conde Sosa (deceased in 1988) and entrepreneurs Antonio Haché, José Antonio Caro Álvarez, Manuel Tavares Espaillat, Carlos Sully Fondeur, Sebastián Mera, and Juan Bautista Vicini.

Although today it is a multiple-purpose bank, it was initially founded as a mortgage bank with the purpose of developing the real estate market and housing.

In 1999, it established its first alliance with Banco Sabadell, and in 2000, it finalized a merger by absorption with Banco Fiduciario. In 2001, it formed an alliance with Banco Popular de Puerto Rico, and by 2006, it had acquired the personal business portfolio of Republic Bank. The following year, it purchased the loans and deposits of the corporate banking sector.

In 2008, the International Finance Corporation (IFC), a multilateral credit and investment organization of the World Bank Group, became involved as a shareholder and strategic partner of the BHD Financial Center.

In 2014, following a merger through share contribution between Banco Hipotecario Dominicano and Banco León, the BHD León Multiple Bank emerged. In March 2022, it was announced that the BHD León Multiple Bank would revert to being called Banco BHD. The change took effect on July 1, 2022.

== See also ==
- List of banks in the Dominican Republic
