= Luis Álvarez Renta =

Dominican economist (born 1950)

Luis Álvarez Renta (born April 9, 1950) is a Dominican economist. Álvarez Renta was found liable by a U.S. federal jury in Miami of civil racketeering and illegal money transfers in a conspiracy to loot Baninter bank during its final months of existence in 2003, for which Álvarez Renta was ordered to pay $177 million to Dominican authorities in November 2005.

== Biography ==
Luis Rafael Álvarez Renta was born in Caracas, Venezuela. His father, Virgilio Álvarez Saviñón, was a renowned and wealthy Dominican engineer who had been forced into exile during the dictatorship of Rafael Leónidas Trujillo. Arriving in Venezuela with twenty dollars and a suitcase, Álvarez Saviñón was able to re-establish his fortune in Venezuela. It was said that in Caracas, "anywhere you looked something had been built by Virgilio Álvarez."

His mother, Thelma Renta, was the sister of fashion designer Oscar de la Renta, and a major social figure in the Dominican Republic in her own right.

Álvarez Renta studied in Venezuela and the Dominican Republic, eventually earning a full scholarship to a Dominican university. He was also able to study in the United States, attending both the University of Michigan and Washington University in St. Louis. His performance in university did not go unnoticed, and he was offered scholarships for graduate work at both Cornell University in Ithaca, New York, and at the MIT Sloan School of Management in Cambridge, Massachusetts. He attended MIT Sloan and received a Masters in Finance. He would later establish a professorship there.

During his early career, Álvarez Renta was offered a number of jobs in the United States. He chose, instead to return to the Dominican Republic. At first, he engaged in the public sector, serving as Sub-Secretary of State for Industry and Commerce, advisor emeritus to the Presidency for Commerce and Finance, and director of CEDOPEX, the oversight agency for Dominican exports.

Having completed his work in the public sector, Álvarez Renta opened his own firm, Luis Álvarez Renta & Asociados, an investment banking firm focused on mergers and acquisitions. For the following thirty-three years, Álvarez Renta was known as the "King Midas" of the Dominican Republic, since his deals always made both sides significant amounts of money. Since the financial sector in the region was underdeveloped, he was often on both sides of a deal, as he was one of the only people in the region with the technical expertise required to process major corporate transactions.

As such, Álvarez Renta essentially created the marketplace for mergers and acquisitions in the Caribbean region, and became very wealthy in the process. An estimate of his wealth made during his divorce case in 2000 placed it at $148 million, although many believed it to be much more than that at the time.

Prior to the Baninter banking scandal, Álvarez Renta had accompanied former Dominican President Hipólito Mejía on many of his trips abroad, and was appointed ambassador to France on April 2, 2003. He decided to accept the appointment as part of his retirement, in order to effect positive change for the country by helping it negotiate a Free Trade Agreement with the European Union.

However, after Governor José Lois Malkún of the Central Bank of the Dominican Republic's announcement that Álvarez Renta was involved in the Baninter debacle, Álvarez Renta resigned from the post in order to avoid a dispute between President Mejía and his advisors.

In response to the announcement, Álvarez Renta took out full-page advertisements in the press, in which he declared he was innocent of all the charges made by the Central Bank. He also claimed to have ended his dealings with Baninter almost two years before it failed in 2003. Álvarez Renta was the only Dominican businessperson who was mentioned by name in the Central Bank report. The report said that overdrafts and loans totaling RD$3.83 billion were erased at the start of this year in favor of the company Bankinvest, S.A., presided and managed by Luis Álvarez Renta.

== Continuing Education ==
One of the major keys to Álvarez Renta’s success was his commitment to continuing education. After graduating from MIT, he would go on to receive advanced degrees and certificates from such schools as the Harvard Business School and the Wharton School of Business at the University of Pennsylvania.

This allowed Álvarez Renta to take new financial technologies and transplant them to the Caribbean marketplace. As an example, he is credited with introducing the "you set the price, I decide whether to buy or sell" negotiation process to the region. His involvement at such a structural level in the development of the economic systems in the region ultimately made it possible for him to become successful.

== Doubts about Baninter ==
Recently, many have expressed doubts about Álvarez Renta’s involvement in the Baninter scandal. He was accused by an administration that ended up being overrun with major corruption charges in a speech written by another financier, Andres Dauhajre, Jr., who had been an advisor to President Mejia and a lifelong rival of Álvarez Renta’s.

At the time of the accusation, Álvarez Renta stood to make US$100 million as part of the sale of a company he had bought that held exclusive contracts for the sale of duty-free items at every Dominican airport. Mejia's administration had challenged those contracts and lost, and many people were interested in acquiring them before the company's sale to a Spanish conglomerate was completed. (As a sidenote, these contracts would become a large part of the execution process in the lawsuit against Álvarez Renta in the United States, and were eventually turned over to the Central Bank of the Dominican Republic.)

The total amount that Álvarez Renta supposedly stole from Baninter was roughly US$59 million. It is presumably difficult to imagine him needing the money.

Álvarez Renta was also the only person in the scandal who was concurrently sued in the United States. Since the U.S. Federal Court is unable to compel testimony from Dominican citizens residing in the Dominican Republic (and none would testify voluntarily), Álvarez Renta claimed to be unable to call even a single witness in his own defense.

Ten of the original eleven charges filed in the criminal action against Álvarez Renta in the Dominican Republic were dropped before trial.

Álvarez Renta was responsible for trying to salvage Baninter by negotiating a merger with another Dominican bank, Banco del Progreso. The merger, which was approved by the Monetary Board of the Dominican Republic, was later undone by the Central Bank.

== After the Miami verdict ==
After being found liable in the U.S. District Court for the Southern District of Florida in November 2005, Álvarez Renta expressed that he blames former Baninter president Baez Figueroa for the colossal fraud that brought down the bank and all but decimated the Dominican economy in 2003. Álvarez Renta, who has been closely associated with the banking collapse, claimed he had no part in it and that Ramon Baez Figueroa and his deputy Marcos Baez Cocco were those responsible. Proceedings in the Dominican Republic began on April 3, 2006, against Baninter's former president Ramon Báez Figueroa and the executives Vivian Lubrano and Marcos Báez Cocco, Luis Álvarez Renta and Jesus Maria Ferrúa. The defense is headed by the famed attorney Marino Vinicio Castillo, whose primary argument is that the authorities under Mejia's presidency (2000–2004) caused the bank's collapse.

On April 7, 2006, the Dominican Government announced it would offer legal and psychological support to former Miss Dominican Republic 1987, Carmen Rita Perez Pellerano, in her demand that her ex-husband, Álvarez Renta, stop harassing her and that she be awarded custody of their daughter. Álvarez-Renta won the case on the note that Ms. Perez was declared psychologically unfit to take care of their, at the time, 7-year-old daughter.

On July 16, 2008, L.A.R. was sent to the prison at Najayo, San Cristóbal (south), to begin serving a 10-year prison sentence.

Sentencing judge Saulo Ysabel Díaz issued the custody order around 7 p.m. July 16, after almost 12 hours of discussion with the condemned and his lawyers, who asked the court to reduce his sentence and that he be allowed to serve his time in prison in the jail at Aras Nacionales, Villa Mella.

Álvarez Renta arrived early Thursday morning at Díaz's office in the company of his lawyers.

== Dealings with the presidencial candidate ==
It was later discovered that Álvarez Renta was the president of Maravedi, a company owned by Miguel Vargas Maldonado, the candidate of the PRD for the next presidential elections. That company was used to defraud the estate during the first years of the decade.
