= Ramón Báez Figueroa =

Dominican Republic businessman

Ramón Buenaventura Báez Figueroa (born 1956) is the former president of Banco Intercontinental (BANINTER) from the Dominican Republic, accused in 2003 of masterminding the country's most spectacular banking fraud scandal, amounting to more than US$2.2 billion ($3.9 billion today).

== Family and early life ==
Descendant of two Dominican presidents (Buenaventura Báez and Ramón Báez Machado), Báez Figueroa comes from an influential Dominican family. His father is the entrepreneur Ramón Báez Romano, grandson of former president Ramón Báez Machado.

Ancestors of Ramón Báez Figueroa

16. Ramón Buenaventura Báez Méndez (1812–1884)
8. Ramón Báez Machado (1858–1929)
17. María de la Concepción Machado Peralta (1823–1902)
4. Buenaventura Báez Soler (ca. 1900–?)
18. Félix Eduardo Soler Rodríguez (1843–1924)
9. Natalia de las Mercedes Soler Machado (1867–)
19. Carolina de las Mercedes Machado Echavarría (1843–1903; niece of #17)
2. Ramón Buenaventura Báez Romano (?–)
5. Estela Romano Martínez
1. Ramón Buenaventura Báez Figueroa (born 1956)

He married María Rosa Zeller Barrous, they had 2 children and divorced. On 12 January 1997, he remarried to Patricia Álvarez DuBreil, the granddaughter of the industrialist Horacio Álvarez Saviñón and cousin-niece of Luis Álvarez Renta, at Casa de Campo in a pompous, ostentatious wedding that cost more than US$ 2 million of the time (US$4 million at 2025 prices) —in a country whose GDP per capita was around US$2,000— it was called the "Wedding of the Century"; they divorced in 2013. He married for a third time in June 2014 to Sandra Martínez Yangüela.

He was the CEO of Banco Intercontinental (BANINTER) from 1993 until its collapse in 2003; he and his father controlled at least 80% of the shares. He was lionized as the Dominican King Midas.

In 2001, BANINTER alone was worth RD$25.57 billion or US$1.51 billion (US$3.03 billion in 2025 prices).

== BANINTER crisis ==
Báez Figueroa was arrested on May 15, 2003, along with BANINTER vice presidents Marcos Báez Cocco and Vivian Lubrano de Castillo, the secretary of the Board of Directors, Jesús M. Troncoso, and financer Luis Álvarez Renta, on charges of bank fraud, money laundering and concealing information from the government as part of a massive fraud scheme of more than RD$ 55 billion (USD $2.2 billion). This sum would be big anywhere, but it was overwhelming for the Dominican economy, equivalent to two-thirds of its national budget.

The resulting central bank bailout spurred 30 percent annual inflation and a large increase in poverty. The government was forced to devalue the peso, triggering the collapse of two other banks, and prompting a US$ 600 million (420 million €) loan package from the International Monetary Fund.

The banking crisis ignited harsh fights over the bank group's media outlets, including the prominent newspaper Listín Diario, which was temporarily seized and run by the Mejía administration following the BANINTER collapse.

Moreover, it was prompted, as detailed at length in the trial that opened in April 2006, by a scandal involving debt writeoffs and sweetheart loans or other financial deals suspected of having favored leading politicians and others.

Rumors that Baninter might have been in trouble began circulating during fall of 2002, and depositors started to withdraw their savings. The Dominican Central Bank stepped in to support the bank by providing new lines of credit. Anxious for a more permanent solution, the government announced in early 2003 that Banco del Progreso, run by Pedro Castillo, the brother of Mr. Mejía's son-in-law, would acquire Baninter. But Banco del Progreso abruptly withdrew from the deal. Government officials said that two-thirds of the money that customers had deposited in Baninter was kept off its official books by a custom-designed software system. Banking regulators and the bank's auditor, PricewaterhouseCoopers, were deceived for years.

In April 2003, the government took control of Baninter. Mr. Báez Figueroa's family owned more than the 80% of the bank, and soon after, a deeper examination supported by the International Monetary Fund and the Inter-American Development Bank, revealed the scale of the meltdown.

With 350 prosecution and defense witnesses slated to testify, ex-President Hipólito Mejía among them, the criminal proceedings against Mr. Báez Figueroa began on April 2, 2006. However, the Collegiate Court decided to postpone the first hearing for May 19, 2006, accepting a motion by the defense lawyers.

== Sentence ==
On October 21, 2007, after the long trial that concluded on September, Báez Figueroa was sentenced by a three-judge panel to 10 years in prison. Additionally, he was ordered to pay restitution and damages totalling more than $31 million. The laundering charges were excluded, but another suspected mastermind of the fraud, financier Luis Álvarez Renta, was convicted and sentenced for money laundering to 10 years in prison. Marcos Báez Cocco, ex-vicepresident of the Bank, was also found guilty, but his sentence will be read on November 16.

Their defence attorneys said they would appeal.

The accusations against two other defendants, Báez's personal assistant and former Baninter vicepresident Vivian Lubrano, as well as the secretary of the Baninter Board of Directors Jesús M. Troncoso, were dismissed for lack of evidence.

== Supporters ==
Friends of Báez Figueroa, groping to explain the shortcuts he took in running BANINTER, pointed to his political connections and a lack of competent managers at the bank. Báez Figueroa's lawyer, Marino Vinicio Castillo, said in an interview that the whole affair had been trumped up for political reasons, and that the claim that RD$55 billion had been embezzled was "a fable." Castillo went on to say that "very dark interests within the government that are blinded by ambition" were behind his client's imprisonment. He accused the government of wanting to dismember BANINTER and divide the spoils. PricewaterhouseCoopers had audited Baninter's books for years and approved them "without any reservations," Mr. Castillo said.

His defenders also said former President Mejía saw Báez Figueroa as a threat to his personal wealth and political influence and to Mejía's ambition to win another term in office. Taking control of BANINTER's media properties and using them to win over public opinion, not cleaning up a scandal, was what the government was after.

Even after his arrest Báez Figueroa remained a central figure in the country's elite, readily accessible even in jail. Within days of his arrest, he received visits from president Leonel Fernández and Hatuey de Camps, then president of the Dominican Revolutionary Party.
