= List of banks in the Dominican Republic =

This is a list of banks in Dominican Republic as of November 2010, published by Superintendencia de Bancos de la República Dominicana, including credit unions and other financial services companies that offer banking services and may be popularly referred to as "banks".

== Central bank ==
- Central Bank of the Dominican Republic

== Local banks ==
The three largest commercial banks — Banreservas, Banco Popular Dominicano, and Banco BHD — together account for approximately 68% of the banking system's total assets (as of December 2025).

== Government-owned banks ==
- Banreservas

== Commercial banks ==
- Banco Popular Dominicano
- Banco BHD (Merged from Banco BHD and Banco León)
- Banco Santa Cruz
- Banco Caribe
- Banco BDI
- Banco Vimenca
- Banco Lopez de Haro
- Bancamérica

== Foreign banks ==
- Banesco
- Scotiabank
- Banco Promerica
- Banco LAFISE

== Savings and credit banks ==
- Banco Atlántico
- Banco Bancotuí
- Banco BDA
- Banco Adopem
- Banco Agrícola De La Republica Dominicana
- Banco Pyme Bhd
- Banco Ademi
- Banco Confisa
- Banco De Desarrollo Idecosa
- Banco Empire
- Banco Motor Credito
- Banco Río
- Banco Providencial
- Banco Del Caribe
- Banco Inmobiliario (Banaci)
- Banco Gruficorp
- Banco Cofaci
- Banco Atlas
- Banco Bonanza
- Banco Bellbank
- Banco Fihogar
- Banco Federal
- Banco Micro
- Banco Unión
- Kneutt F.Bank

== Savings and loan associations ==
- Asociación Popular de Ahorros y Préstamos
- Asociación Cibao
- Asociación Nortena
- Asociación Romana
- Asociación Higuamo
- Asociación La Vega Real
- Asociación Duarte
- Asociación Barahona
- Asociación Maguana
- Asociación Mocana
- Asociación Bonao
- Asociación La Nacional
- Asociación Noroestana

== Defunct or merged banks ==
- Banco Intercontinental (BANINTER; fell in 2003)
- Bancrédito (fell in 2003)
- Banco Mercantil (fell in 2003)
- Republic Bank (local operations bought by Banco BHD in 2007)
- Banco Altas Cumbres (local operations bought by Scotiabank in 2008)
- Banco Peravia; Asociación Peravia (disestablished in 2014)

== Automated teller machines ==
- There are 2462 automated teller machine

== Bank penetration in Dominican Republic ==
- The bank penetration is approximately 33.7% and the main banks in DR are Banco Popular Dominicano, Banco de Reservas de la Republica Dominicana, Banco BHD.
