= Carmenchu Brusíloff =

Dominican Republic journalist

- Born: María del Carmen Brusíloff Ugarte; Santander, Spain
- Spouse: Ángel Ramos Usera
- Children: 3
- Parent(s): Constantino Brusíloff, María Ugarte
- Awards: Premio Shell de Periodismo (1973); Premio Anual de Periodismo Arturo J. Pellerano Alfau (1975); Premio Periodista de Turismo (1983, 1988, and 1990); Caonabo de Oro (1997)

María del Carmen "Carmenchu" Brusíloff Ugarte (born c. 1938) is a Dominican journalist, editor, and writer. Born in Spain to a Spanish-Dominican intellectual, María Ugarte, she immigrated to the Dominican Republic as a child refugee fleeing the Spanish Civil War. After initially working in corporate bilingual administration and living abroad as a military spouse, Brusíloff entered journalism in the late 1960s at El Caribe.

== Early life and career ==
She was born in Santander, Spain. Brusíloff was born to Constantino Brusíloff, a Russian academician and combatant in World War I and the Spanish Civil War, and to María Ugarte, a Spanish journalist and writer.

Her family was moving to the Dominican Republic around February 1940 as refugees due to the Spanish Civil War.She was moving to the Dominican Republic at 2 years old. She started reading by learning to read "Platero and I" with Ugarte. Then, at age eleven, she liked to accompany her mother when she worked with El Caribe, and at the same age she began her radio career by reading the news at a station operated by the newspaper.

Following her graduation from bilingual secretarial studies in Colegio Santo Domingo, Carmenchu Brusíloff spent two years in Spain completing a course in Hispanism. Upon returning to the Dominican Republic, she worked as an executive secretary for the general manager of the Hotel Jaragua Intercontinental and later for the Pan American Airways station manager at the airport. She eventually resigned after marrying Ángel Ramos Usera, a Dominican Air Force pilot. The family relocated multiple times due to her husband's situation. Before the outbreak of the Dominican Civil War, the family was transferred from the United States to Buenos Aires, where they lived for a year before returning to the Dominican Republic under the provisional government of Héctor García Godoy.

Then, she began her journalism career in the late 1960s alongside her mother, María Ugarte, starting as an English translator for the foreign press section at the morning newspaper El Caribe. At that time, she translated for The Washington Post and The New York Times. She was also managing the "Anotaciones" column in the newspaper at that time.She is editor-in-chief of the magazine Aldaba.

== Personal life ==
Her eldest son, Ángel, was born in Santo Domingo, while their daughters, Carmen Virginia and Alexis, were born during a military posting of his husband in Washington, D.C.

== Works ==
- Retazos de una vida (2015)
