= Guillermo Caram Herrera =

Dominican politician (1941–2025)

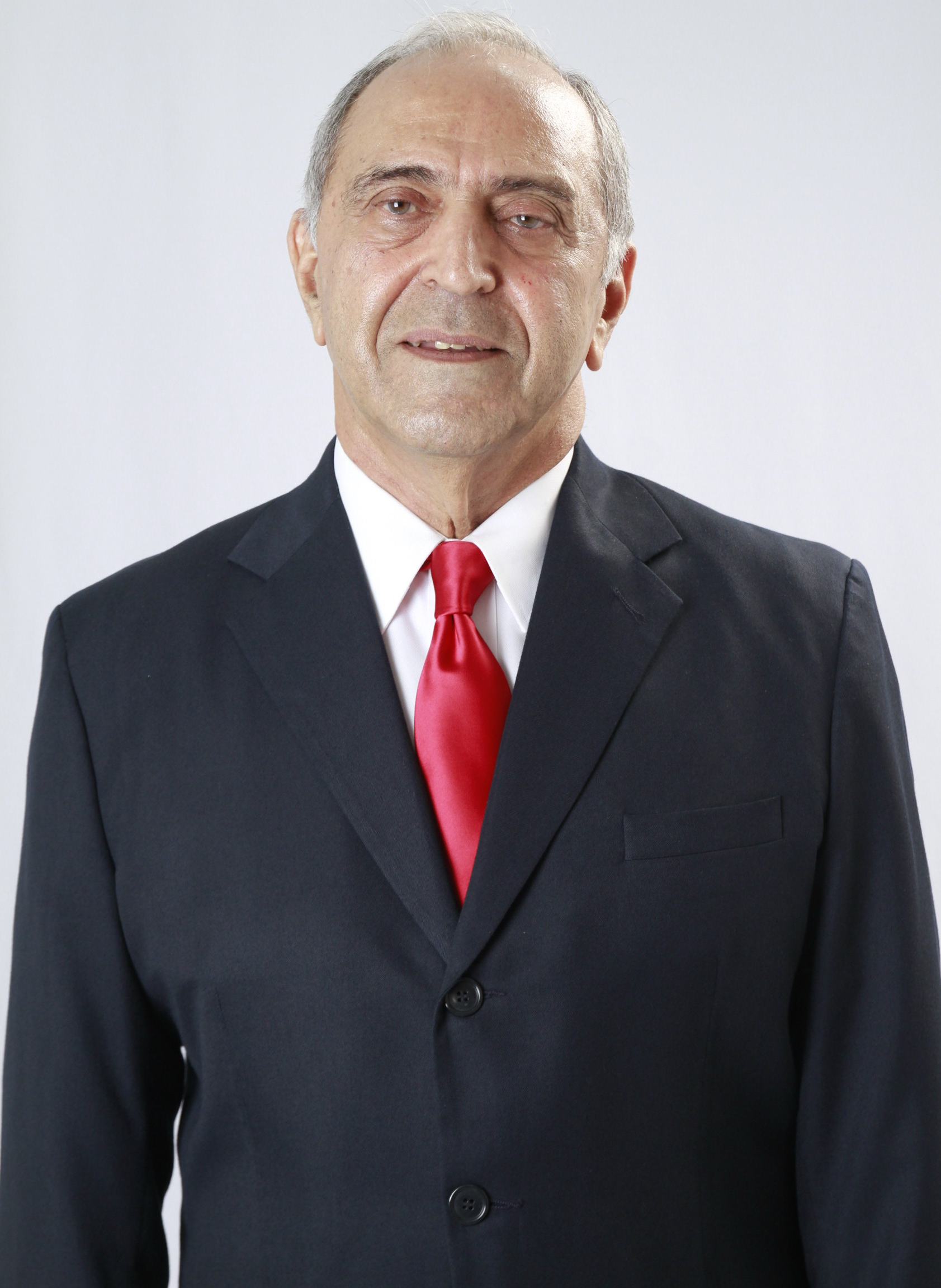
- Caram in 2019

Minister of Finance
- In office 1989–1989
- President: Joaquín Balaguer
- Preceded by: Roberto Martínez Villanueva
- Succeeded by: Rodolfo Rincón Martínez

Governor of the Central Bank of the Dominican Republic
- In office 1989–1990
- President: Joaquín Balaguer
- Preceded by: Roberto Saladín
- Succeeded by: Luis F. Toral Córdoba

Personal details
- Born: 28 January 1941 San Pedro de Macorís, Dominican Republic
- Died: September 2025 (aged 84)
- Party: PRSC
- Education: Universidad Autónoma de Santo Domingo
- Occupation: Economist

Guillermo Caram Herrera (28 January 1941 – September 2025) was a Dominican economist and politician. A member of the Social Christian Reformist Party, he served as minister of finance of the Dominican Republic in 1989 and as governor of the Central Bank of the Dominican Republic from 1989 to 1990.

Caram died in September 2025, at the age of 84.
