= Feline Quezada Figueroa =

Dominican actress

Feliné Quezada Figueroa
- Feliné Quezada Figueroa
- Born: Ursulina Feline Quezada Figueroa; Santo Domingo, Dominican Republic
- Occupations: Actress, lawyer
- Known for: Bachata ante mortem, Las rosas de María Fonseca, La viuda

Feliné Quezada Figueroa, also registered as Ursulina Feline Quezada Figueroa, is a Dominican stage and film actress. She has appeared in productions by Haffe Serulle and Ricardo Muñoz Caravaca. Her documented theatrical work includes Bachata ante mortem, Las rosas de María Fonseca, and La viuda.

== Artistic career ==
=== Theatre ===
In 2012, Quezada was part of the cast of Bachata ante mortem, a play written and directed by Haffe Serulle. The production was presented by the Lluvia Negra theatre group at the experimental theatre of the National School of Dramatic Arts in Santo Domingo, from 17 to 29 July.

The production addressed violence against women and used bachata as part of its theatrical language. The play sought to raise awareness about the importance of education against violence toward women.

In 2013, she appeared in Las rosas de María Fonseca, a tragicomedy by Cuban playwright Ricardo Muñoz Caravaca. The production was directed by Jorge Junior Gómez Guzmán and staged at the Ravelo Hall of the Eduardo Brito National Theatre. The story follows María Fonseca, a woman who decides to publish her memoirs during the final moments of her life.

The production returned to the stage in December of the same year, with performances on 7 and 8 December at the Ravelo Hall.

In November 2015, Quezada played the title role in La viuda, written and directed by Haffe Serulle. She performed alongside Santiago Alonso, and the play was staged at the Juan Lockward bar of the Eduardo Brito National Theatre. The production opened on 5 November and remained on the programme until the end of the month.

Theatre critic Etzel Báez published a review of La viuda in elCaribe on 24 November 2015. He discussed Quezada's performance, highlighting her vocal work, energy, and the sensitivity with which she portrayed the character. He also commented on the onstage relationship between Quezada and Santiago Alonso, as well as the use of music in the production.

=== Film ===
Quezada is listed as an actress in the official professional directory of the Dominican Republic's Directorate General of Cinema, under the name Ursulina Feline Quezada Figueroa.

== Real estate dispute ==
Quezada has maintained a public campaign for several years concerning the ownership of a home. According to her account, she purchased the property and received a title certificate in her name, but the registration was later cancelled because of irregularities in the documentation. She alleges that she was the victim of real estate fraud and has requested an investigation into the actions related to the case.

In August 2024, Dominican media reported on her protests outside institutions connected to the real estate jurisdiction. According to those reports, Quezada was requesting an investigation into the loss of her property and had been received by the First Lady of the Dominican Republic, who agreed to forward her request for an investigation.

In July 2026, Quezada stated that she had been protesting regularly outside the Registry of Titles for more than four years. The following month, she announced that she would take her claim to the National Palace and requested compensation for the economic and personal harm she said she had suffered. In her statements, she described the dispute as having lasted approximately five years.

=== Criminal complaint in 2026 ===
On 24 August 2026, it was reported that Quezada had filed a criminal complaint and civil action against lawyer Juan Antonio Capellán Nin, alleging his involvement in real estate transactions connected to falsified identity documents and property titles. The complaint was filed with the Public Prosecutor's Office for the Judicial District of Santo Domingo Oeste.

According to the complaint, one of the transactions involved a property in Arroyo Hondo. Quezada stated that she had paid RD$500,000 in cash and that alleged falsifications were later detected in the title certificate and the identity document used by the person presented as the seller. The complaint also refers to another real estate transaction in Santo Domingo Este and to financial losses that the complainant estimates at RD$12 million.

The allegations represent the complainant's account, and any determination of criminal responsibility is a matter for the judicial authorities. The sources cited here do not establish that a final judgment has determined the criminal responsibility alleged in the complaint.

=== Plaza Central incident ===
On 31 August 2026, Quezada published messages on social media expressing her exhaustion over the prolonged real estate dispute. The following day, several media outlets reported that she had been assisted during a crisis at a building in Plaza Central, Santo Domingo, after another person intervened to prevent her from harming herself.

The reports linked the incident to the dispute that Quezada had been pursuing for approximately five years. Following the intervention, she did not harm herself. The incident brought renewed public attention to her allegations and her request for an institutional response.
