= María Ugarte =

Spanish-Dominican academic and writer

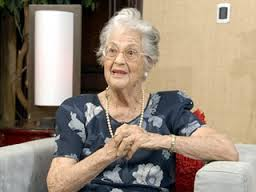
- Born: February 22, 1914; Segovia, Spain
- Died: March 4, 2011 (aged 97); Santo Domingo, Dominican Republic
- Resting place: Cristo Redentor cemetery
- Citizenship: Spanish (1914–2011); Dominican (1950–2011)
- Education: Complutense University of Madrid
- Spouses: Constantino Brusíloff (m. 1935; div. 1945) José A. Jiménez (m. 1950; died 1966)
- Children: Carmenchu Brusíloff
- Writing career
- Notable awards: (Spain) Order of Civil Merit (1986) (Dominican Republic) Patrimonio Cultural Viviente de la República Dominicana (1995) (Dominican Republic) Grand Officer of the Order of Merit of Duarte, Sánchez and Mella (2002) (Dominican Republic) Premio Nacional de Literatura (2006)

María de la Purificación Ugarte España (22 February 1914, Segovia, Spain – 4 March 2011, Santo Domingo, Dominican Republic) was a Spanish-Dominican journalist, writer, academician, historian and palaeographer. Ugarte was the first woman who worked as a journalist in the Dominican Republic, and also the first woman to become a member of the Dominican Academy of History.

== Biography ==
María Ugarte was born in Segovia, Old Castile, Spain, to Comdt. Jerónimo de Ugarte Roure, a Basque soldier who became civil governor of Zamora in the second Republican biennium. She was a student of Antonio Machado and Ortega y Gasset, and classmate of Julián Marías.

Ugarte España obtained a degree in Philosophy and Literature (1935) at the Central University of Madrid (now Complutense University of Madrid), specializing in Historical Sciences, and was assistant professor of the historian Pío Zabala (1934–1936).

At the university she met Constantino Brusíloff (b. Constantin Alekseievich Brusiloff-Nigehorodzeff, Saint Petersburg, 1895 – Caracas, 1977), a Russian exile, veteran of the First World War (and later from the Spanish Civil War too). They married and had a daughter Carmen.

The political situation in the country with the outbreak of the civil war and the rise of Franco, forced them to fled into exile in the Dominican Republic, where they arrived on early February 1940. At first, Ugarte worked at the State Secretariat for Foreign Affairs; she also went on to teach the Spanish language to Jewish refugees of the World War II in Sosúa, in northern Dominican Republic.

Between June and November 1943 she taught at the University of Santo Domingo the first course of Archival Science that was ever held at the Dominican Republic. She made the first Bulletin Index of the General Archive of the Nation, which was published in 1947. During the 1940s, Ugarte discovered a huge repertoire of colonial documents, among them, the Royal Archives of Bayaguana. By 1945, Brusíloff and Ugarte divorced and the former moved to Venezuela.

In April 1948, Ugarte started her career as a journalist in the newspaper El Caribe, invited by its managing editor, Mr. Rafael Herrera; at El Caribe she was assistant editor, director of the cultural supplement (1963–1998), and director of Supplements and worked in there until she retired, in 2000. In 1950, she married with separate property to the cattleman José Antonio Jiménez Álvarez.

== Works ==
- Origen de las universidades y de los títulos académicos
- Monumentos coloniales (1977)
- La Catedral de Santo Domingo, Primada de América (1992)
- Iglesias, capillas y ermitas coloniales (1995)
- Estampas coloniales (1998)
- Prats Ventós, 1925–1999 (2002)
