= Emma Polanco =

Dominican accountant and academic

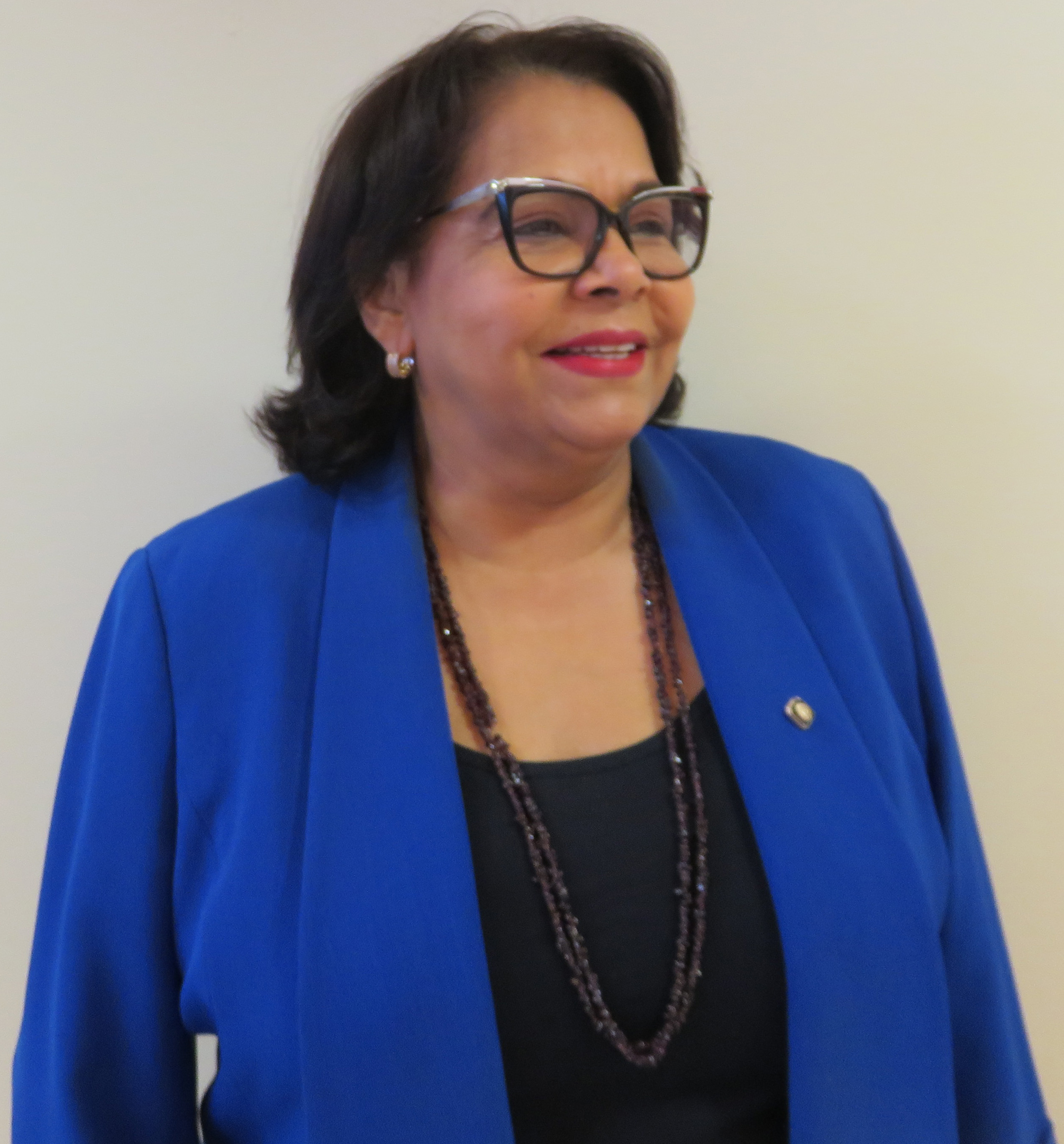

Rector of the Universidad Autónoma de Santo Domingo
- In office 16 July 2018 – 16 July 2022
- Preceded by: Iván Grullón Fernández
- Succeeded by: Editrudis Beltrán

Personal details
- Born: Emma Polanco Melo Puerto Plata, Dominican Republic
- Spouse: Cándido Mercedes
- Education: Universidad Autónoma de Santo Domingo; University of the Basque Country
- Occupation: Accountant, academic

Emma Polanco Melo is a Dominican accountant and academic. She is the first woman to serve as rector of the Universidad Autónoma de Santo Domingo (UASD), and was the first woman elected dean of its Faculty of Economic and Social Sciences.

== Early life ==
Emma Polanco was born in Puerto Plata, the youngest of eight siblings.

She met her future husband, Cándido Mercedes, in 1981. They would go on to have three children together.

== Education ==
In 1981, Polanco obtained her undergraduate degree, a Bachelor of Accounting from UASD. She completed a postgraduate degree in Cost Accounting at the Higher Institute of Accounting in 1994. In 1996, she finished another postgraduate degree at UASD in Tax Accounting. From 2005 and 2007, she completed a master's degree, and later a doctorate in Applied Economics at the University of the Basque Country.

== Career ==
In 1977, Polanco began working as deputy manager at the Dominican International Exchange Company.

She held other prominent positions in Dominican companies, such as Representaciones Titanic, where she served as financial manager. In 1979, she became head of the accounting and costs department of Explotaciones Mineras del Caribe, and in 1981, she took over the financial department of the NAINSA company. In addition to these positions, she provided financial advice at the Haitian Embassy in the Dominican Republic in 1990, and in 1994 advised the cost and tax department of Ethical Pharmaceutica.

After her first daughter was born with a congenital heart defect, she left the business world and dedicated herself to research and teaching at the Santo Domingo Institute of Technology (INTEC), becoming director of its accounting school from 1991 to 1996.

Polanco began academic management at UASD in 1994, as director of the School of Accounting, where she also dedicated herself to research and teaching. She served as its vice dean from 1996 to 2002. She was then elected the first woman dean of the Faculty of Economics and Social Sciences in 2002, and reelected in 2005, holding the position until 2008.

She was administrative vice-chancellor of UASD from 2011 to 2014, and in 2018 was elected UASD's first woman rector.

== Recognition ==
Emma Polanco received the Honor of Professional Merit from the Inter-American Accounting Association and the Latin American Association of Accounting Faculties and Schools (ALAFEC) in Buenos Aires, Argentina.

In addition, she was recognized by the Chamber of Deputies of the Dominican Republic as an Outstanding Woman in 2018, thanks to her contributions to the development of the community and the country.
