= Universidad Autónoma de Santo Domingo =

Public university in the Dominican Republic

Autonomous University of Santo Domingo
- Universidad Autónoma de Santo Domingo (Spanish)
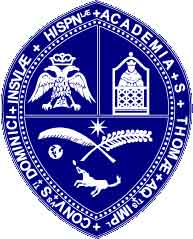
- Other name: UASD
- Former names: Estudio General de Santo Domingo (1518–1538); Universidad Santo Tomás de Aquino (1538–1823); Instituto Profesional (1866–1914); Universidad de Santo Domingo (1914–1961)
- Motto: Neo Mundi Decanatus (Latin)
- Motto in English: Deanery of the New World
- Type: Public
- Established: October 1538, 25; 488 years ago
- Affiliations: ACURIL, AUF, Consejo Superior Universitario Centroamericano, Universia, Unión de Universidades de América Latina y el Caribe
- Budget: RD$16,411,439,756.00 billion (FY 2026)
- Rector: Jorge Asjana
- Faculty: 1,770
- Students: 204,021 (2021)
- Location: 18°27′39″N 69°55′04″W; Avenida Alma Mater, Ciudad Universitaria 1355, Santo Domingo, Distrito Nacional, 10105, Dominican Republic
- Campus: Urban, 0.95 km², main campus only
- Colors: Blue and white
- Website: www.uasd.edu.do (in Spanish and English)
- Location within the Dominican Republic

Universidad Autónoma de Santo Domingo (English: Autonomous University of Santo Domingo, UASD) is a public university system in Dominican Republic, with its flagship campus in Ciudad Universitaria (lit. University City) neighborhood of Santo Domingo and regional campuses in many cities of the country. It was founded by Jose Gabriel Garcia and Emiliano Tejera in 1866 as the Professional Institute, replacing the former Universidad Santo Tomás de Aquino, one of the first universities of the Western Hemisphere (Americas), which was founded unofficially by a Papal bull in 1538, officially by royal decree in 1558, and closed in 1822. It was later renamed University of Santo Domingo in 1914.

In structure, the school followed the model of the University of Alcalá de Henares. The university organized its offerings into four schools: Medicine, Law, Theology, and the Arts. As of September 6, 2026, the university has expanded to eight schools: Humanities, the Arts, Law and Political Science, Health Sciences, Economics and Social Sciences, Science, Engineering and Architecture, and Agricultural Sciences.

== History ==
The university traces its foundations to a Dominican seminary established in 1518. This was raised to the status of a university by the Papal Bull In Apostolatus Culmine, issued by Pope Paul III on 28 October 1538, and granted the same rights and powers as the Spanish University of Alcalá de Henares. It was initially organised in four faculties, following the pattern of medieval European universities: Theology, Law, Medicine and Arts.

In 1801, the university was suspended due to the Haitian occupation; it reopened in 1815 after Spanish colonial rule was restored under the rectorship of Dr José Núñez de Cáceres. In 1821, poet, philosopher, and political activist Andrés López de Medrano was appointed rector, bringing his progressive ideals to the institution. However, it was forced to close again in 1822 due to the conscription of its students. After the Dominican Republic was established in 1844, an attempt to reopen the university was made by President Pedro Santana in 1859, but this was unsuccessful.

In 1866 the Instituto Profesional (Professional Institute) was created by Jose Gabriel Garcia and Emiliano Tejera in Santo Domingo, providing higher education in the city. This was closed in 1891 but reopened in 1895. On 16 November 1914, President Ramón Báez (who was also rector of the institute) raised it to university status under the name "University of Santo Domingo". This new university was forced to close by the US occupation from 1916 to 1924. After the start of the dictatorship of Rafael Leonidas Trujillo in 1930, the university was unable to operate independently; it was only on 31 December 1961, after Trujillo's death, that a law was passed restoring its autonomy.

== Faculties ==
The authorities for the period 2018–2022 are:

=== Humanities ===
The Humanities Faculty is formed of the Schools of Social Communication, Philosophy and Anthropology, History, Foreign Language, Literature and Psychology Schools.

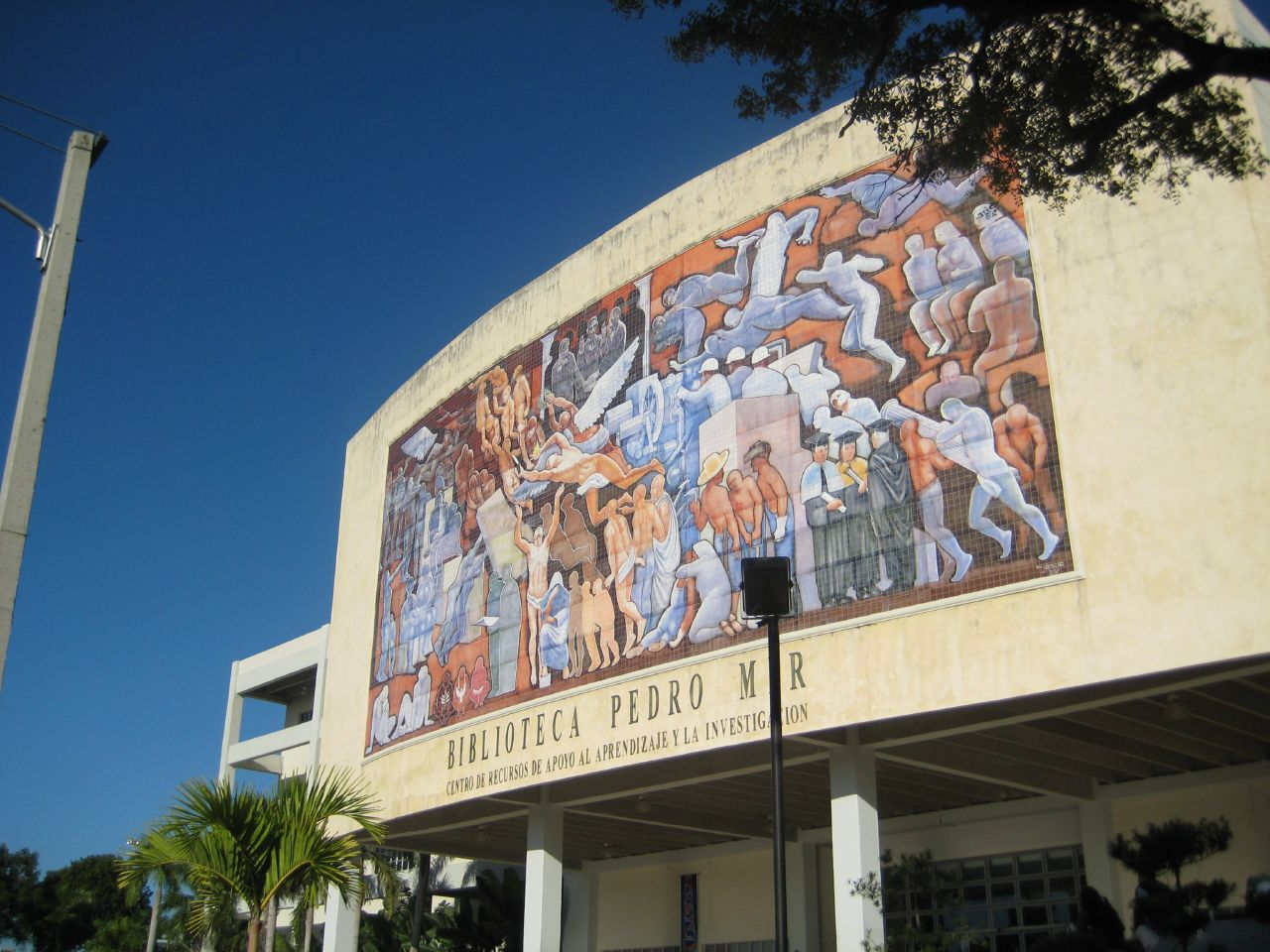
The Pedro Mir Library

=== Agronomy and veterinary sciences ===
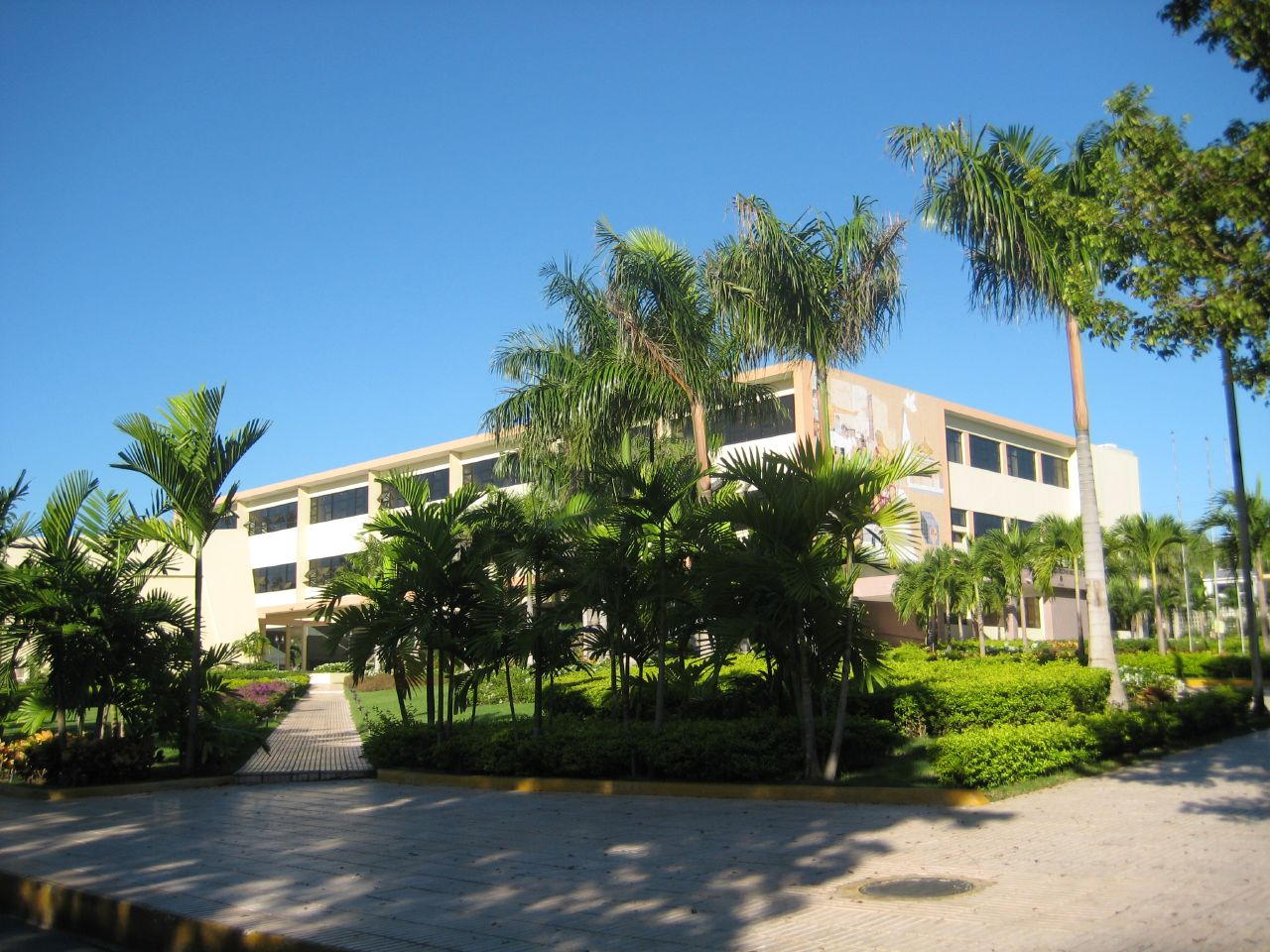
A building at Agronomy and Veterinary Sciences, Autonomous University of Santo Domingo

The Agronomy and Veterinary Sciences Faculty is formed of the Schools of Agronomic Engineering, Zootechnics and Veterinary Science Schools.

=== Laws and political sciences ===
The Law and Political Science Faculty is formed of the Schools of Law and Political Science Schools.

The Law and Political Science Faculty award the titles of Licentiate in Law and Licentiate in Political Science; the latter has three majors: Internationals Studies, Socioeconomics Studies and Internationals Relationship. The Criminology Institute is a part of the Faculty.

=== Economics and social sciences ===
By Law 4412 of 24 March 1956 the University Organization Law of 21 October 1937 was modified, adding the Economics and Commerce Faculty to the existing faculties. The new faculty would award the degrees of Licentiate in Commercial Science and Doctor in Economics and Commercial Science.

At the same time, Law 4413 decreed that the four courses "of the second cycle of the Superior School of Accountant Technician, established by the decree 2383... were assigned to the Economics and Commerce Faculty of the Santo Domingo University from 12 October 1956, under the name of Commercial Science Department".

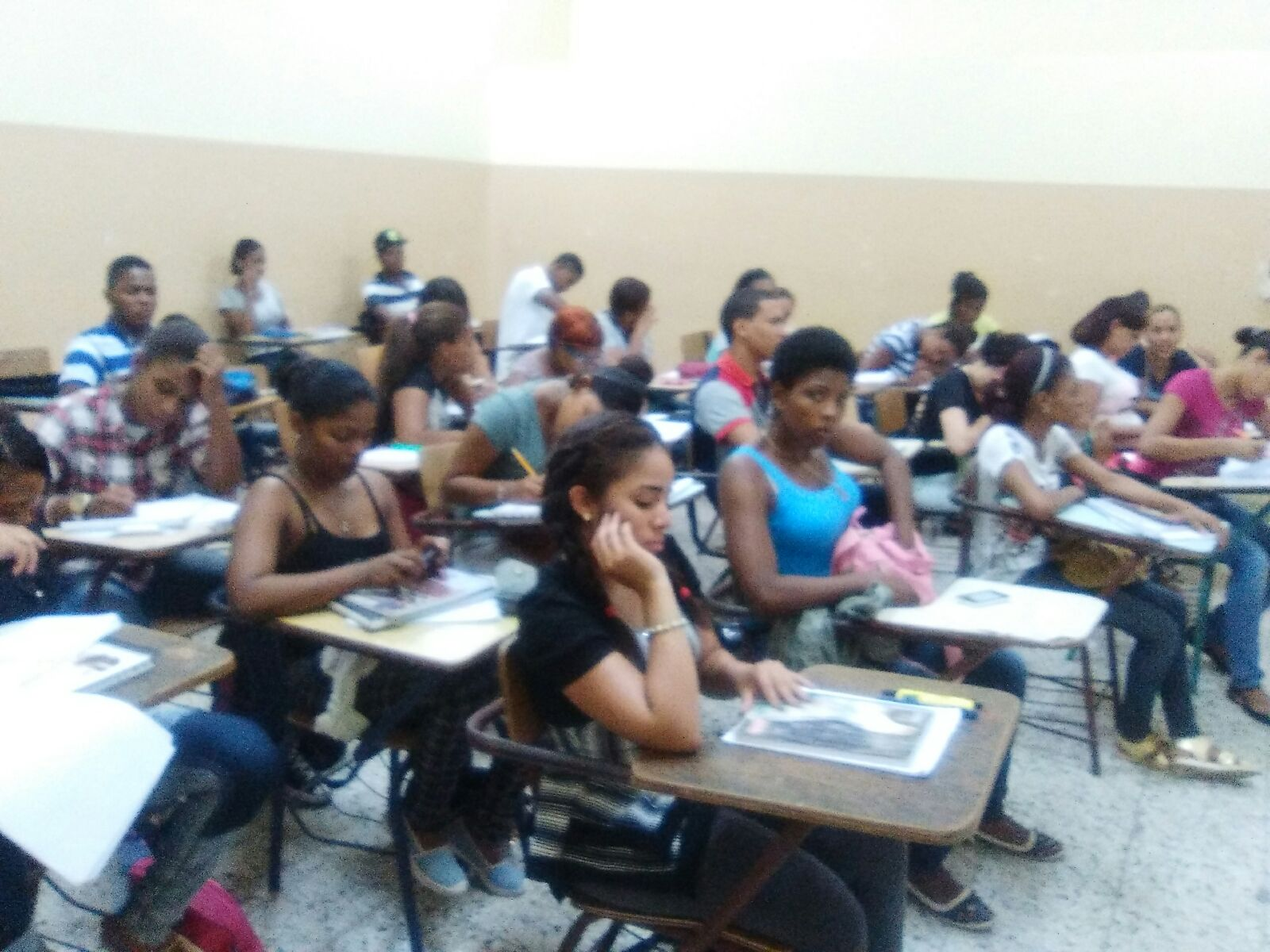
Undergraduate students at the Universidad Autónoma de Santo Domingo

The Law 4439 dated 4 May 1956 changed the name of the "Economics and Commerce Faculty" to the "Economics, Finance and Commerce Faculty". This same law authorized to the graduates of the Superior School of Accountant Technician, with the title of Accountant Technician "provides them with licence to practice the profession of Authorized Public Accountant and carry the title in Commercial Science and allows them to opt for the Doctorate in Commercial Science by the presentation of a thesis, following the regulation dictated by the University Council".

In 1960, Law 5130 changed the "Economics, Finance and Commerce Faculty" to the "Economic Science Faculty" and included the Public Administration School. The Organic statute approved by the University Cloister in 1966, gave the faculty its current name of the "Economics and Social Sciences Faculty".

Currently, the Economics and Social Sciences Faculty is formed of the Schools of Economics, Accountant, Statistics, Sociology, Marketing and Administration Schools.

=== Engineering and architecture ===
The Engineering and Architecture Faculty is formed of the Schools of Architecture, Electromechanics Engineering, Civil Engineering, Chemical Engineering, Surveying and Industrial Engineering Schools.

=== Sciences ===
The Science Faculty is constituted of the Schools of Biology, Geographic Science, Physics, Mathematics, Microbiology and Parasitology, Chemistry and Computing Schools.

=== Health sciences ===
The Health Sciences Faculty formed of the Schools of Pharmacy, Imaging, Nursing, Dentistry, Bioanalysis, Medicine, Public health, Physiology and Morphology Schools.

=== The arts ===
The Arts Faculty is formed of the Schools of Criticism and History of Art, Publicity, Theater, Music, Film, Television and Photography, Industrial Design and Fashion and Plastic Arts Schools.

== University authorities, 2018–2022 ==
- Rector Emma Polanco Melo
- Educational vice-rector: Alejandro Ozuna Morla.
- Vice-rector of Research and Postgraduates: Mauro Canario .
- Administrative vice rector: Pablo Valdez.
- Vice-rector of Extension: Antonio E. Medina Calcaño.

== Notable faculty ==
- Andrés López de Medrano
- Federico Henriquez y Carvajal
- Maria Ugarte
- Julio Ortega Frier
- Eugenio Maria de Hostos

== Notable alumni ==
Former Instituto Profesional (1866-1914)

- Americo Lugo, historian and writer
- Fabio Fiallo, diplomat, writer, poet
- Alejandro Woss y Gil, president of the Dominican Republic
- Francisco Henriquez y Carvajal, president of the Dominican Republic
- Francisco Moscoso Puello, scientist and writer
- Emilio Prud’Homme, writer of the National Anthem of the Dominican Republic
- Evangelina Rodriguez, first Dominican female doctor
- Manuel de Jesus Troncoso de la Concha, president of the Dominican Republic
- Luis Manuel Betances Cohen, surgeon and hematologist
- Manuel de Jesus Galvan, writer
- Manuel de Jesús Troncoso de la Concha (1878-1955), politician, past president of the Dominican Republic

University of Santo Domingo (1914–present)

- Frank Moya Pons, historian
- Pedro Mir, writer
- Fernando Perez Memen, author and professor
- Alfonso Rodriguez, film director
- Abel Gonzalez Massenet, doctor
- Julio Hazim, doctor
- Geovanny Vicente Romero, lawyer, political analyst and CNN columnist
- Leonel Fernandez, president of the Dominican Republic
- Joaquin Balaguer (1906-2002), president of the Dominican Republic
- Roberto Cassa, writer and historian
- Renee Klang de Guzman, first Dominican first lady
- María Teresa Mirabal, surveyor and political activist
- Minerva Mirabal, lawyer and activist
- Franklin Dominguez, playwright
- Marisela Alvarez, television show host and architect
- Donald Reid Cabral, politician and lawyer
- Rene Fortunato, filmmaker
- Viriato Fiallo, doctor and politician
- Freddy Beras Goico, television show host and comedian
- Fernando Luna Calderon, scientist
- Pedro Borrell, architect
- Hector Garcia Godoy, president of the Dominican Republic
- Leopoldo Minaya, writer
- Juan Luis Guerra, musician
- Marcio Veloz Maggiolo, archaeologist and anthropologist
- Jose del Castillo Pichardo, sociologist
- Elsa Núñez, artist
- José Francisco Peña Gómez, politician
- Nancy Alvarez, psychologist and talk show host
- Hatuey de Camps, (1947 – 2016). Politician, former president of the Lower House of Congress
- Freddy Ginebra, writer and journalist
- Rafael Camilo Abreu, politician
- Salvador Jorge Blanco (1926-2010), former president of the Dominican Republic
- Andrés L. Mateo, writer
- José Miguel Bonetti, businessman
- Margarita Cedeño de Fernández, politician, former vice-president of the Dominican Republic
- Héctor Valdez Albizu, Governor of the Central Bank of the Dominican Republic
- Silvia García Polanco, former president of the Central American Parliament
