= Rafael Camilo Abreu =

Sociologist, historian, economist and politician

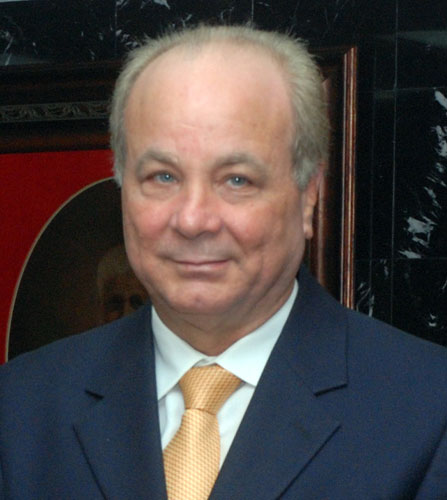

Eusebio Rafael Camilo Abreu (born 1948 in Moca) is a sociologist, historian, economist and politician from the Dominican Republic. He was General Director of the Customs Office of the Dominican Republic and member of the Economic Cabinet during the last presidency of Leonel Fernández. He was appointed Superintendent of Banks in August 2012, by President Danilo Medina Sánchez, retaining this post until 15 September 2014.

== Biography ==
Camilo Abreu was born on 12 September 1948, son of Juan M. Camilo and Ana Josefa Abreu. He graduated from the School of Sociology of the Autonomous University of Santo Domingo (UASD). He took a master's degree in economics at the National Autonomous University of Mexico (UNAM), and a Doctorate in History at the University of Seville, Spain.

He was Director of the National Planning Office (ONAPLÁN) under the 1996–2000 government, and Superintendent of Banks from 2004 until May 2009, when on the death of Miguel Cocco he was appointed by President Fernández as Director General of the Customs Office. Under President Medina Sánchez he was re-appointed as Superintendent of Banks in August 2012.

He chaired the Central American council of superintendents of banks and financial institutions from 2005 to 2007. He has also acted as advisor and consultant to various national and international institutions, including the Dominican Institute of Technology (INDOTEC) and the United Nations Development Programme (UNDP).

In the academic field he has taught and researched on the Dominican economy, Sociology of Underdevelopment, and Politics for the UASD and for the Santo Domingo Institute of Technology. He has published articles, monographs and essays in newspapers, journals and textbooks.

He has acted as coordinator or speaker on behalf of his country at various national and international summits, conferences, commissions, assemblies and seminars, in North, Central and South America, the Caribbean, Europe and Asia.

He was Vice-Secretary General and coordinator of the Technical Secretariat of the Dominican Liberation Party (PLD) and was a member of the Economic Cabinet during the government of President Fernández, 2008–2012.

== Political life ==
Camilo Abreu is a member of the Central Committee of the PLD, and has coordinated the party's electoral campaigns in different provinces during the presidential campaigns of Fernández and Medina.
