= Pelegrín Castillo =

Dominican politician

Pelegrín Horacio Castillo Semán

Minister of Energy and Mines of the Dominican Republic
- In office April 2014 – 16 August 2020
- Preceded by: Office created
- Succeeded by: Antonio Almonte

Member of the Chamber of Deputies of the Dominican Republic
- In office August 22, 1994 – August 22, 2014

Personal details
- Born: April 22, 1956 (age 70) San Francisco de Macorís, Dominican Republic
- Relations: Vinicio Castillo Semán (brother)
- Parents: Vincho Castillo (father); Sogela Semán (mother)

Pelegrín Horacio Castillo Semán (born April 22, 1956) is a Dominican politician. He was the first to be Minister of Energy and Mines of the Dominican Republic; he was in office from April 2014 to 16 August 2020. He was elected deputy in 2010 for a period of 6 years, but in 2014 he resigned to take over as Minister of Energy and Mines. In 2012, he was candidate for the presidential election of that year in the Dominican Republic. He also ran for president in the presidential elections of 2016.
