= Evangelina Rodríguez =

Dominican poet and physician

Andrea Evangelina Rodríguez Perozo (1879–1947) was the first female medical school graduate in the Dominican Republic.

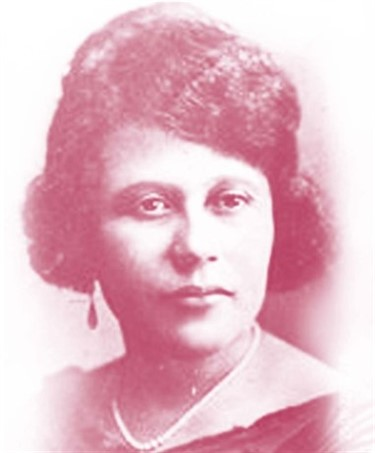

== Early life ==
She was born on November 10, 1879, in San Rafael de el Yuma, La Altagracia (Dominican Republic), in a poor family. Her mother, Felipa Perozo, was an illiterate peasant who was left pregnant by Ramón Rodríguez, a wealthy merchant of the area who was also an officer in the army of Pedro Santana. Her mother first abandoned her, and then her father did the same when she was a child and her paternal grandmother took charge of her. Rodríguez's grandmother Tomasina Suero de Rodíguez was a marchanta (itinerant female vendor of homemade confections and sweets) in San Pedro de Macorís. Many of Rodríguez's family and friends called her Lilina as a nickname. At the age of 6, Rodríguez was selling gofio (a sweet toasted cornmeal powder) that her grandmother made at home to help pay for her school fees. Her father would occasionally visit.

== Career ==
=== Medical career ===
At the age of 12 Rodríguez became a part-time home health aid to Dominican Poet and journalist Rafael Alfredo or "Pepe Cándido" Deligne (1863-1902), who had fallen ill to leprosy. This encounter allowed Rafael Alfredo to become Rodríguez's mentor and the opportunity led her to attend the Instituto de Señoritas in the Dominican Republic. There Rodríguez began her college career in pursuit of becoming a teacher. Once accepted into the school of Instituto de Señoritas, there she meets the founder of Instituto de señoritas Salomé Ureña, Anacaona Moscoso who invested and encourage her to become her predecessor as headmistress of an all-girl grade school. In addition, before Anacaona Moscoso passing due to childbirth complication, she motivated Rodríguez to pursue medical school. When Rodríguez completed secondary schooling, she continued teaching and in October 1903 Rodríguez began medical school at Universidad Autónoma de Santo Domingo Departamento de Medicina founded in 1538, (Predecessor) Rodríguez received her medical degree in 1909, becoming the first woman to earn her medical degree in the Dominican Republic.

She is the first doctor of the university institute of the Dominican Republic. As a young and medical physician of color, Rodríguez attempted to make a living in San Pedro de Macorís but founded it challenging to do so as an inexperienced female doctor. As a result of the lack of profits, Rodríguez moved to the region of Ramom Santana which was home to the many who were part of the guerrilla resistant’s and oppose actively the American invasion of United States occupation of the Dominican Republic (1916–1924). There Rodríguez provided medical and teaching services for greater funds and experiences. In 1921, three years of providing free medical care in San Francisco and neighboring poor rural communities, Rodríguez left for Paris so she could continue her studies and practice medicine. In 1926, she returned to the Dominican Republic, with an advanced degree in obstetrics and public health care along with a degree in politics. In addition, there in Ramom Santana is where she has the first encounter with Dominican dictator Rafael Trujillo. Rodríguez considered dictator Rafael Trujillo a threat to the nation and refused to remain silent. As a result of her defiance to the Trujillo regime 1930s and 1940s the Acción Feminista Dominicana (AFD) (Dominican Feminist Action) alliance with the regime erased Rodríguez's contributions to Dominican history as well as women’s health care in the island and other activists like herself from official Dominican feminist memories and history. As the Trujillo’s authoritarian regime rose to power, Rodríguez fell victim to Trujillo’s brutality which led to the destruction of her medical practices as she was shunned by local politicians and her professional colleagues. In addition, In 1935 Dr. Rodríguez survived police brutality as she was pursued relentlessly by the police, for failure to show proper gratitude to General Trujillo in an honorable mention she received for her essay, Social Medicine and Protection of the Species.

She established Mother’s Milk Bank (Banco de Leche Materna), cow’s Milk Dispensary (Gota de Leche), vaccination clinic, Society for the Protection of Mothers and Infants (Sociedad Protectora de la Maternidad y la Infancia), tuberculosis sanatorium, and lepers’ asylum, in San Pedro de Macorís. Rodríguez Perozo also had advocated for school-based sex education, family planning, birth control, and venereal disease prevention and treatment. Much of her radical ideas, as it was then seen, for the progression of women’s healthcare came from the influences of her time in France for medical school where she was trained to be a gynecologist. Once she returned from France and saw a high rate of venereal disease, she began to provide free health care to women in need this included visiting the prostitute neighborhood. In addition, to giving free milk to nursing mothers and free food to poor children.

=== Educator ===
Rodríguez's mentor, Anacaona Moscoso Puello (1876-1907), founded the Instituto de Señoritas (Young Ladies Institute) in 1898 and personally enrolled Rodríguez in her first class that graduated in 1902. Following the death of her mentor, Rodríguez agreed to become the director in 1907. Rodríguez taught at the Young Ladies Institute during the day, and in the evenings at the Laborers and Domestic Workers Night School (Escuela Nocturna para Obreros y Domésticas). In teaching at both schools, she wrote and published her 1915 book titled Granos de polen (Pollen Grains), on hygienic and childrearing.

=== Writing ===
In addition to Perozo's medical work, she was also an author and published her first book Granos de polen in 1915, and subsequently published some poems and articles in the magazine "Fémina." On her return from the French capital she published a second book, titled Le Guerisseur: Cuento Chino Bíblico Filosófico de Moral Social. Her biographer Antonio Zaglul also indicates that she prepared the manuscript of a novel titled Selene in honor of her adoptive daughter, but destroyed it in a fit of anger.

== Death ==
Zaglul also states that she was seized for her opposition to the regime of Rafael Leónidas Trujillo and her strong criticism of the government, and that she was held in a fortress in San Pedro de Macoris and tortured. She was later abandoned on a road near the town of Hato Mayor. She died on January 11, 1947, after several days of agony.

== Legacy ==
Despite the Trujillo’s authoritarian regime attempt to erase Rodríguez from official documented Dominican History, she is remembered in the Dominican Republic today, as a pioneer in the Dominican medical field especially as it relates to women health care. She is honored by having the Dominican Social Security Institute (IDSS) reopened, remodeled, and renaming the Dominican Women's Hospital in Santo Domingo and San Rafael del Yuma after her. in addition, to the Dominican Republic establishing and naming the elementary school of Evangelina Rodríguez (Niña) in her hometown of San Pedro de Macorís. Rodríguez was never married, however she did adopt a daughter Selisette Sánchez Santiago, whose mother was a patient of Rodríguez but died after giving birth to her daughter in 1929.
