= Pedro Borrell =

Dominican Republic architect

Pedro José Borrell Bentz
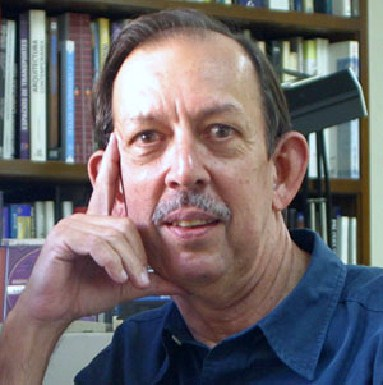
- Born: October 6, 1944 (age 81); Santiago, Dominican Republic
- Education: Universidad Autónoma de Santo Domingo; Escuela Nacional de Bellas Artes de Santiago
- Occupation: Architect
- Awards: The Dominican Society of Architects selected the "20 Paradigms Buildings in the Dominican Republic in the 20th century", of which two were designed by Borrell
- Practice: Arquitectura del Sol
- Buildings: Banco Popular Dominicano Headquarters, Governmental Building El Huacal, León Jimenes Group Headquarters, Seguros La Universal Headquarters, Cancha de Polo Residential Complex
- Projects: Santo Domingo's National Aquarium, Barceló Bávaro Palace Hotel, Barceló Playa Tambor Hotel, Stanza Mare, Playa Turquesa, Mormon Dominican Headquarters, Centro León, Bohemia Brewery, La Altagracia Museum, Viamar Headquarters, Physical Planning for the UCMMM (University)
- Design: Novo Mundo XXI, Master Plan Facenda, Americana Mall, Plaza Lama Center, History and Geography Museum

Pedro José Borrell Bentz (born in Puerto Plata, Dominican Republic October 6, 1944) is an internationally recognized Dominican architect and archeologist who has earned several awards and is recognized for the transcendence in his architectural designs.

== Biography ==
Pedro José Borrell was born in Puerto Plata, Dominican Republic on October 6, 1944. His parents were Agustín Borrell Hungría (the son of José Ramón Borrell Arché, of Catalan and French descent, and Ana Joaquina Hungría Valdez) and Rosa Bentz de Ferrari (daughter of Rodolfo Tomás Bentz Hachtmann, who was born to German parents, and Margarita Ana Francisca de Ferrari, a native from Santa Margherita Ligure in northern Italy). He graduated with a degree in arts from the National School of Fine Arts in Santiago and later in architecture from the University of Santo Domingo in 1967. From 1967 to 1971 he was director of the Planning Office for the Universidad Católica Madre y Maestra. From 1971 going forward, Borrell has been devoted in the field of architecture and construction with distinguished contributions in the fields of photography, underwater archeology and environmental conservatism.

Among his most notable architectural works are the National Aquarium, Headquarters for Banco Popular Dominicano, Juan Pablo Duarte Government Building (El Huacal) and Novo Mundo XXI, a coastal reclamation project which will be hosted by a million square meters on the Caribbean Sea, along the waterfront of Santo Domingo.

In pursuit of his interests of underwater archaeology and conservation he has been Executive Director of the Underwater Archeological Rescue Committee since 1979, responsible for rescuing national heritage immersed in the remains of ancient shipwrecks off the Dominican Republic’s coast. His experience in this field has prompted him to write several books and articles on the subject which have been published both nationally and internationally.

He has written articles in Geomundo, Unesco's Museum Magazine and in Dominican News Paper Listín Diario. Has also published several books: Arqueología Submarina en la República Dominicana, Planificación Física de la Pontificia Universidad Catolica Madre y Maestra y Rescate del Galeón Concepción. He is also co-author of Navegantes y Náufragos and co-editor of La Aventura del Guadalupe, both published in Madrid, Spain and Novo Mundo XXI, a coastal reclamation project which will be hosted by a million square meters on the Caribbean Sea, along the waterfront of Santo Domingo.

Ancestors of Pedro Borrell

16. Pedro Borrell Rimbaud
8. Pedro Borrell Cot
17. Rita Cot
4. José Ramón Borrell Arché
18. José Arché
9. Leonor Arché Román
19. Baldomera Román Leguisamón
2. Agustín Borrell Hungría
20. José Antonio Hungría (1819–1872)
10. José Joaquín Hungría Balbuena
21. Saturnina Balbuena
5. Ana Joaquina Hungría Valdez
11. Bárbara Valdez
1. Pedro José Borrell Bentz
24. Felipe Bentz
12. Emille Bentz Rosp
25. Maria Rosp
6. Rodolfo Tomás Bentz Hachtmann
26. Claudio Chistian Hachtmann
13. Maria Ana Magdalena Hachtmann
27. Margarita Rebeca Sofia Kohn
3. Rosa María Bentz de Ferrari (1914–2013)
14. Antonio de Ferrari Costa
7. Margarita Ana Francisca de Ferrari Peirano
15. Rosa Peirano

== Notable works ==
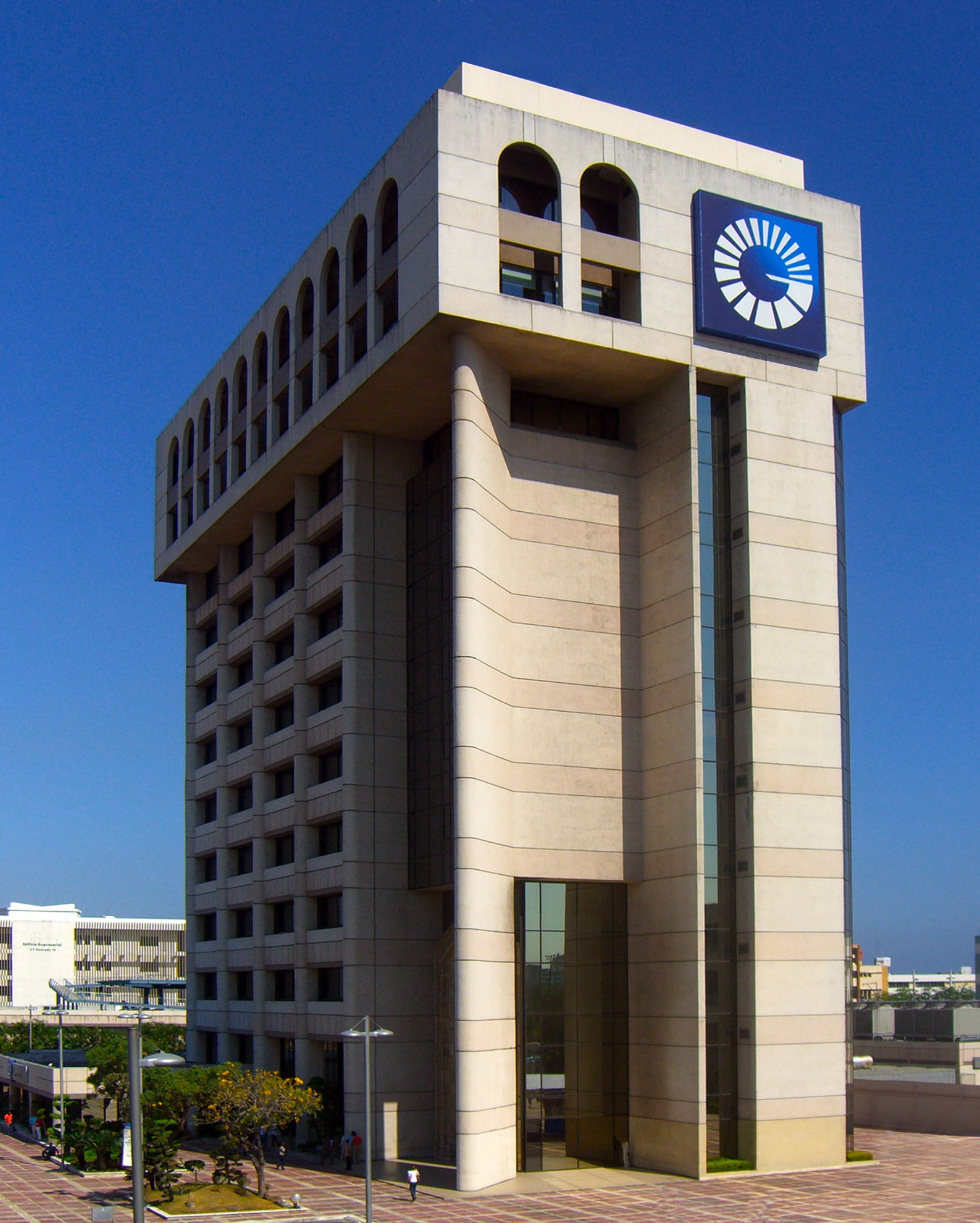
Banco Popular Dominicano Headquarters (Santo Domingo, Dominican Republic)

- Mall Galería 360 (Santo Domingo, Dominican Republic), 2010
- Cerarte's Eastern Branch (Punta Cana, Dominican Republic), 2009
- La Altagracia Museum (Higüey, Dominican Republic), 2009
- Playa Turquesa Project (Bávaro, Dominican Republic), 2006
- Stanza Mare Project (Bávaro, Dominican Republic), 2004
- Novo Mundo XXI (Santo Domingo, Dominican Republic), 2003
- Centro León (Santiago, Dominican Republic), 2000
- Santo Domingo's National Aquarium (Dominican Republic), 1986
- Headquarters for Banco Popular Dominicano (Santo Domingo, Dominican Republic), 1990
- Barceló Tambor Beach Hotel (Bahía Ballena, Costa Rica), 1992
- Master Plan Facenda (Brazil), 2008
- Americana Hardware Store (Santo Domingo, Dominican Republic), 1995
- Headquarters for Group León Jimenes (Santo Domingo, Dominican Republic), 2000
- Nestlé Headquarters (Santo Domingo, Dominican Republic), 1997
- Government Building Juan Pablo Duarte (Santo Domingo, Dominican Republic), 1971

== Titles ==
- 1967-1971 Director of the Office of Physical Planning of the Universidad Catolica Madre y Maestra
- 1968 Founder of the famed photo group “Jueves 68”
- 1975 Founder of Underwater Research Group (GIS)
- 1979-2000 Led the Submarine Archaeological Rescue Committee
- 1990 Director of the Office of Underwater Cultural Heritage

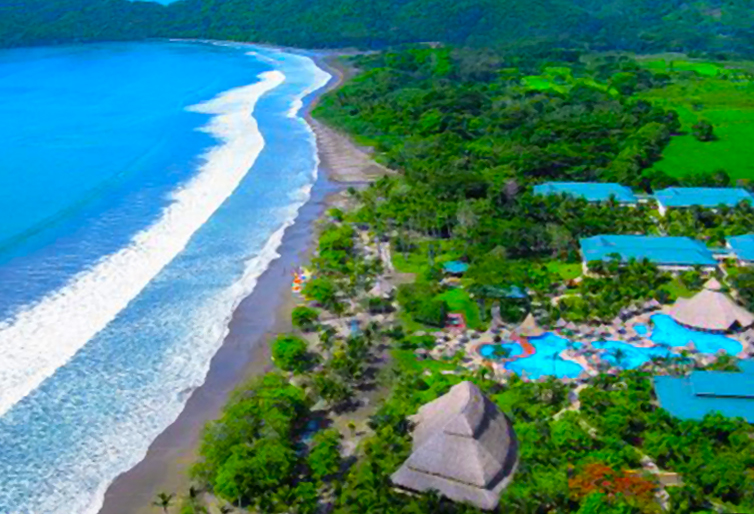
Barceló Tambor Beach Hotel (Bahía Ballena, Costa Rica)

- 1992 Commissioner of the Dominican Republic to the Italian government at the show "Christopher Columbus: The ship and the Sea"
- 1994 - 1996 Member of the Committee of eco-tourism from the Secretary of State for Tourism
- 2002 Delegate to Congress of the International Union of Architects in Madrid, Spain.
- 2004 Delegate to the XIII Pan American Congress of Architects in San Juan, Puerto Rico.

== Awards ==
- 1967 Award for best student in architecture awarded by CODIA
- 1972 Highest Silver Prize of the Jaycees
- 1990 The Dominican Society of Architects selected "20 Paradigms Buildings in the Dominican Republic in the 20th century”, two of which were designed by Borrell
- 1992 The Dominican Chamber of Construction awarded the prize "Work most Technologically advanced for its time" for the design and construction of the National Aquarium
- 1993 The Scientific Community Loyola (COMCIL) awarded the Loyola Prize for his scientific contributions to the national community
- 1994 His name appears in "International Who's Who in art and antiques"
- 1997 One of the Dominicans included in "One Thousand Profiles of the World"

== Contests ==
- 1970 Duarte Market (2nd)
- 1971 Government office Buildings (1st )
- 1974 Dominican College of Engineers and Architects (1st)
- 1974 Olympic Cycle Track (2nd)
- 1974 Olympic Stadium (3rd)
- 1976 Mortgage Bank (2nd)
- 1976 Health Center Hato Mayor (1st)
- 1977 Golf Villas, Dorado Beach (3rd)
- 1979 Santo Domingo Country Club (2nd)
- 1981 Villas Portillo Hotel (1st)
- 1988 Rosario Dominicana Building (2nd)
- 1990 Financial Headquarters Building, (1st)
- 1996 Universal Insurance Headquarters(1st)
- 2000 Hotel Casa del Mar in Casa de Campo (1st)

== Sources ==
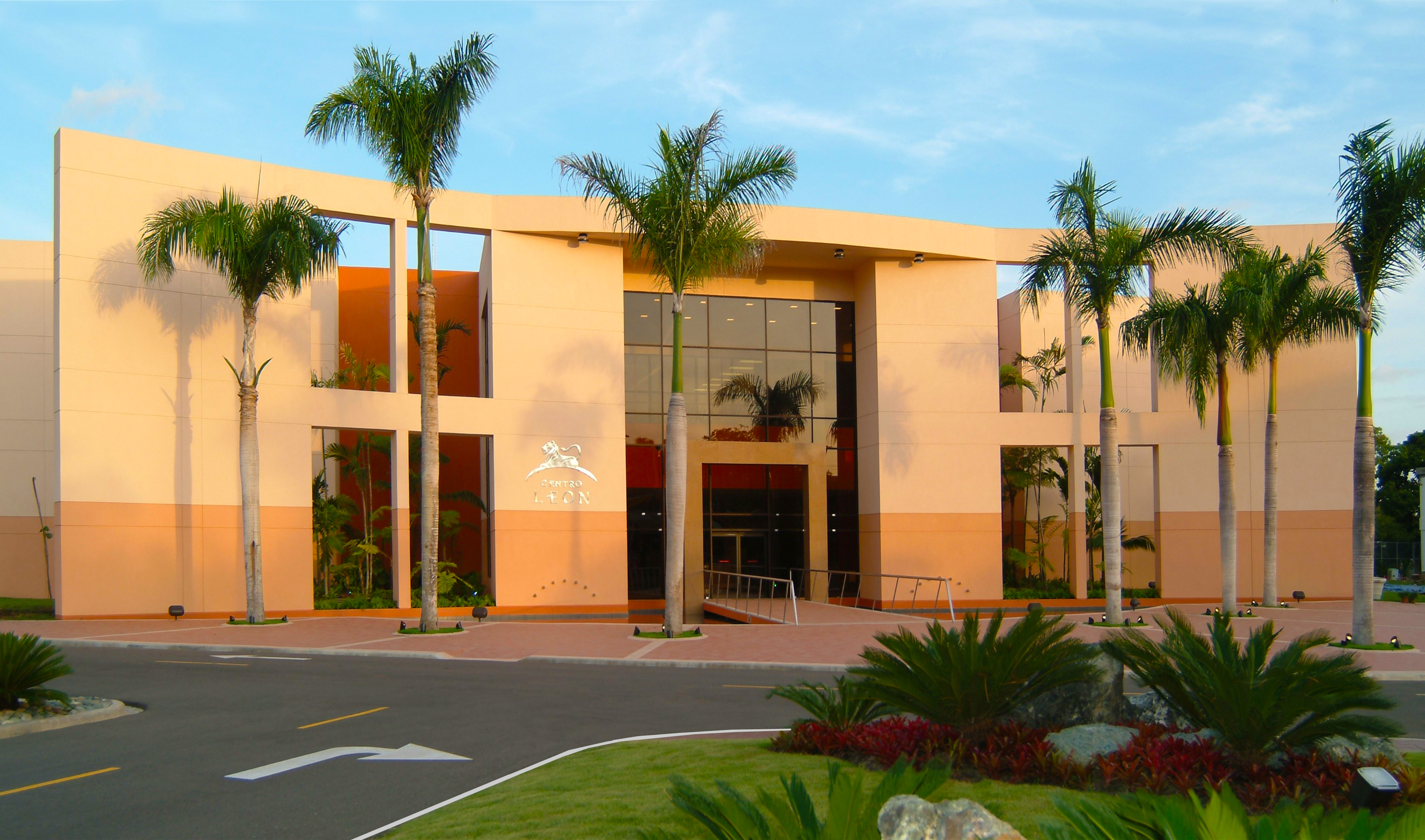
Centro León (Santiago, Dominican Republic)

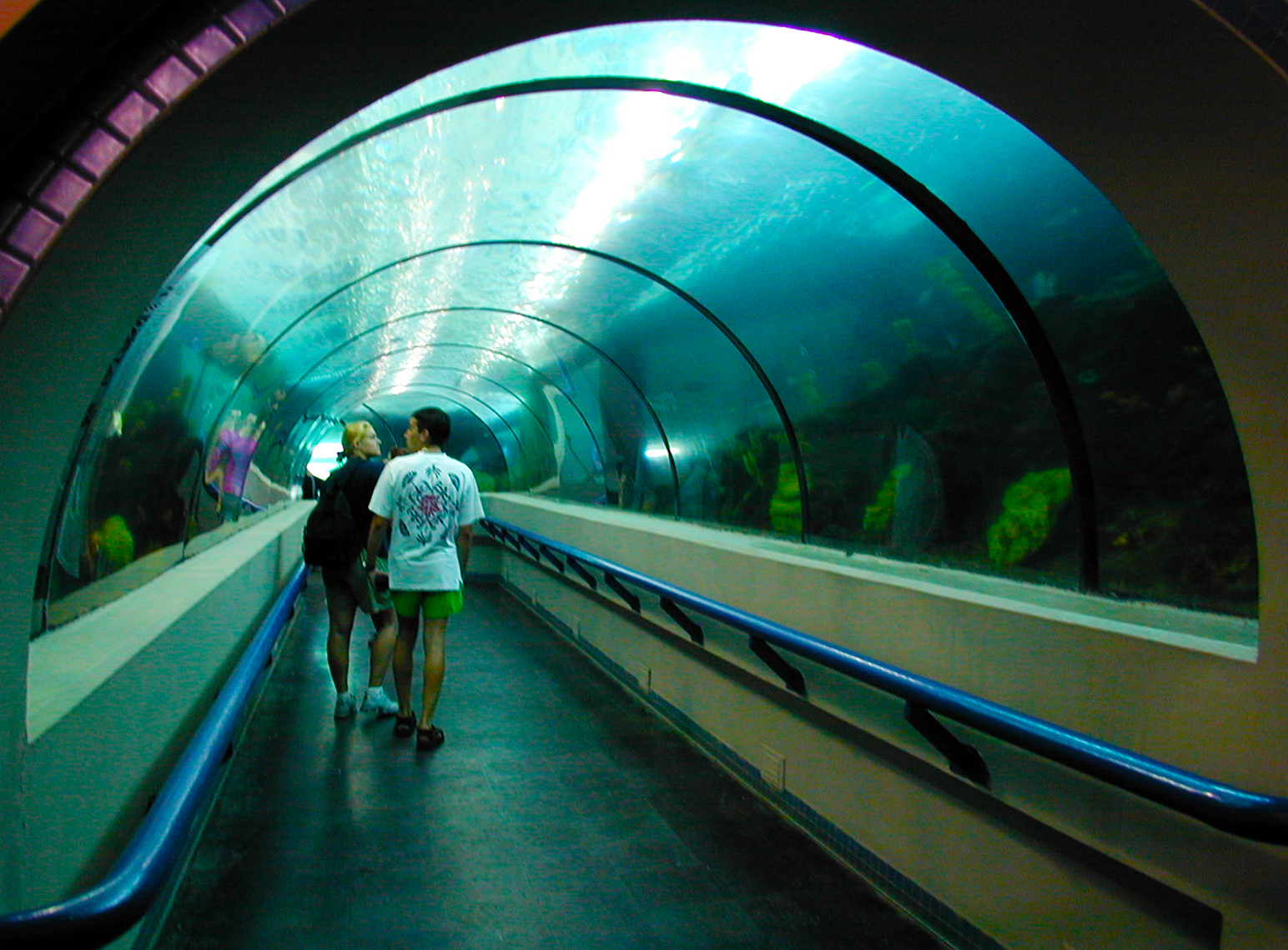
National Aquarium (Santo Domingo, Dominican Republic)

Omar Rancier (2003). "Cuando se Irrespeta la Ciudad". El Caribe.

Senado de la República Dominicana (2005). "Acta de la Presentacion".

José Ramón Alonso Lorea (2010). "Arquitectura y Diseno". Monografias.com.

Funglode (2010). "Periodos de la Arquitectura Dominicana". Funglode. Archived from the original on 4 October 2011.

- Planificacion Física de la Pontificia Universidad Católica Madre y Maestra. Santiago: Amigo del Hogar. 1971.
- Historia y Rescate del Galeon Nuestra Senora de la Concepcion. Santo Domingo: Mograf, S.A. 1983.
- Riches on the Caribbean sea-bed. United States: Museum International. 1983.
