= Héctor Valdez Albizu =

Dominican banking official (born 1947)

Governor of the Central Bank of the Dominican Republic and President ex officio of the Monetary Board of the Dominican Republic
- Incumbent
- Assumed office 17 August 2004
- Vice Governor: Clarissa de la Rocha de Torres
- Preceded by: José Lois Malkún
- In office 16 August 1994 – 16 August 2000
- Vice Governor: Luis Manuel Piantini Munnigh
- Preceded by: Mario Read Vittini
- Succeeded by: Francisco Guerrero Prats-Ramírez

Personal details
- Born: Héctor Manuel Valdez Albizu; 10 November 1947 (age 79) Ciudad Trujillo (now Santo Domingo), Dominican Republic
- Citizenship: Dominican
- Spouse: Fior D'Aliza Altagracia Martínez Ramírez
- Children: Héctor Manuel Valdez
- Parents: Héctor Manuel Valdez Guerrero (father); Ana Rita Albizu Reyes (mother)
- Relatives: Siblings: Ramón E. Valdez Albizu (1951–2011); José E. Valdez Albizu (b. 1954); Ricardo A. Valdez Albizu (b. 1958); Jacobo M. Valdez Albizu (b. 1964)
- Education: Autonomous University of Santo Domingo
- Occupation: Central banker
- Profession: Economist

Héctor Manuel Valdez Albizu (born November 10, 1947) is the current Governor of the Central Bank of the Dominican Republic, a position he first held from 31 August 1994 through 16 August 2000, and again since 17 August 2004. He is also a well known economist and author of numerous works relating to economics.

== Early life and family ==
Valdez Albizu is the son of Ana Rita Albizu Reyes and Héctor Manuel Valdez Guerrero.

== Education ==
In 1971 Valdez received his bachelor's degree in Economics from the Autonomous University of Santo Domingo. Afterwards, he did post graduate work at the Institute of Social Studies, Universidad Católica de Chile in the center for Student Movements Relations Organization. His area of study was primarily related to the Social Aspects of Economic Development, Latin American University Reforms, and Landholding-Agrarian Reform from 1966 to 1967.

He then left for Washington, D.C. to continue work at the International Monetary Fund Institute of Specialized Studies as a specialist in monetary policy, public finance and the design of monetary and financial Programs from 1974 to 1977. He finally returned to the Dominican Republic for further study and research at the Organization of American States, in the Central Bank and Advanced Studies Investigation Center.

== Career at BCRD ==
Valdez began his career at the Dominican Central Bank (BCRD) in 1970 as a Technical Assistant in the Economic Research Department, occupying the position of Director of that department from 1984 through 1986. He then held increasingly influential positions in the BCRD, including: Assistant Manager, Monetary and Exchange Policy (1986–1990); Advisor to the Monetary Board (1987–1989); Representative of the Central Bank before the Administrative Board of the Banco de Reservas (1991–1992); and Assistant General Manager (1991–1993).

On January 4, 1993, he was designated General Administrator of the Banco de Reservas, a position he occupied until August 31, 1994, when he was designated Governor of the BCRD. He was reconfirmed in that position in August 1996 by President Leonel Fernández, and was granted the rank of Cabinet Minister, occupying that position until August 16, 2000. Again, on August 16, 2004, President Fernández appointed him Governor of the BCRD. As a governor of the Central Bank, he has been Titular Member of numerous commissions established by Executive Order.

== Research projects and academic publications ==
During his outstanding career as an economist he has worked on numerous research projects, among which are:

- "Study of the Parallel Exchange Market"
- "Investment Alternatives in Financial Activities"
- "Importance of the Financial Market on the Exchange System"
- "Financial Programs for the Dominican Republic, 1976-1990"
- "Dimensions of the National Banking System and its Enhancement Possibilities", 1976
- "Exchange Emergency Regime", 1985
- "Reform of the Financial System, a Proposal", in 1985.

In 1996 he published Un camino hacia el desarrollo (A Road toward Development), Conferences and Addresses, and, in 2000, Un camino hacia el desarrollo II. He also taught at the Universidad Central del Este from 1975 to 1977, and at the Instituto de Estudios Superiores (APEC), from 1978 to 1989.

== International meetings ==
On behalf of the Dominican Central Bank, he has participated in various international meetings as an official representative. Among the most important are the meetings of Latin American Integration Association of the Monetary and Financial Affairs Board (CFM), of Latin America Central Banks Governors' meetings held in Canada, Spain and the Philippines; the Inter-American Development Bank Governors' Assemblies and the Inter-American Investment Corporation, Dominican Republic, 1992.

He participated in the foreign debt renegotiations with commercial banks during 1992 and with the member governments of the Paris Club between 1992 and 1993. He also attended a working lunch with the U.S. Treasury Secretary in 1994 and is a signatory to the 1995 Constituent Agreement for the Multilateral Investment Guarantee Agency (MIGA). He also represented the Dominican Republic at the 35th Meeting of Central Bank Governors of the American Continent held in Hong Kong during 1997.

== Awards ==
In addition to being a leading member of the Dominican Association of Economists (CODECO), Valdez Albizu has received numerous awards for his many years of service towards the economic development of not only the Dominican Republic, but Latin America in general. During 1996 he was awarded the Public Servant Medal of Merit in the Dominican Republic and the Gaucho Rioplatense award from Dirigencia Magazine in Buenos Aires, Argentina. He was voted Economist of the Year 1997 by the Dominican Association of Economists, and during 1998 he was given the title of Distinguished Visitor by the city of Barahona and voted Banker of the Year by Listín Diario Newspaper. In 1999 he was named Boss of the Year by the Dominican Association of Secretaries and listed among the 500 Personalities of the Financial World by Who's Who United States. Valdez Albizu was selected by British magazine The Banker as governor of the year for 2005, in the Latin American region. The magazine granted the prize acknowledging Valdez Albizu's contributions to recuperating the Dominican economy achieved during President Leonel Fernández's current administration. Valdez Albizu is the first Dominican Central Bank governor to receive such an honor. In the comments on the award, The Banker stated that "the Dominican Republic recuperated during 2005, vigorously expanding the economy and ending the year with a single-digit inflation rate."

Government offices
Preceded by Mario Read Vittini	Governor of the Central Bank of the Dominican Republic; 1994–2000	Succeeded by Francisco Guerrero Prats-Ramírez
Preceded by José Lois Malkún	Governor of the Central Bank of the Dominican Republic; 2004–presentday	Incumbent
