= Vincho Castillo =

Dominican lawyer and politician (born 1931)

Marino Vinicio Castillo Rodríguez (born July 18, 1931), better known as Vincho, is a prominent Dominican lawyer, and controversial figure in Dominican politics. He is the president of the conservative political party National Progressive Force (Fuerza Nacional Progresista), and served as the main defense attorney of Ramón Báez Figueroa, prosecuted for the largest bank fraud in Dominican history, the Baninter case.

== Early life and family ==
Castillo (born in San Francisco de Macorís, Dominican Republic) is the son of Pelegrín Castillo Agramonte, also an attorney and founder of a law firm that Vincho maintains until today, and Narcisa Rodríguez. He married Sogela Semán, the daughter of Christian Palestinian immigrants from Bethlehem and Nazareth, and begat his childs Pelegrín Horacio, Juárez Víctor, Vinicio Aristeo, and Sogela María.

His paternal grandfather was first cousin of Matías Ramón Mella Castillo, one of the Founding Fathers of the Dominican Republic.

== Career in Politics ==
During the regime of Rafael Trujillo, Vincho was appointed by the Dominican Party as Representative for the then-one party Congress, and later worked with President Joaquín Balaguer in the Agrarian Reform of the early 1970s.

Linked to the most obscure faction of then-ruling Reformist Party, Vincho was accused of being the central figure in the manoeuvre that caused the electoral conflict of 1978, when President Balaguer refused to accept Antonio Guzmán's victory. Eventually, four elected senators from the opposing PRD where snatched away in a very questionable decision by the Electoral Junta. It has been alleged that Vincho personally altered and falsified acts and documents to support the fraud, but these accusations were never proved.

By the 1990s, Vincho was a presidential candidate and a senate candidate, but lost both elections. From 1996, he adhered himself to Leonel Fernández, serving him as the president of the National Counsel of Drugs.

== Working against drug trafficking ==
Castillo has for over twenty years taken a hardline position against the growth of narcotics trafficking in the Dominican Republic and the Caribbean, since elevated drug profits found their way into the economy of the island nation. During the last 15 years, office buildings, apartments towers, hotels and shopping centers have emerged in Santo Domingo, Santiago and San Francisco de Macorís - often in a style described as narco-deco. Dominican banks have opened branches as far away as Thailand, raising new fears about the growing economic influence of the traffickers.

On May 11, 1998 Castillo was quoted as saying "There is a process of Colombianization going on, it is a very serious threat," adding, "The Colombians may not have been able to detect it happening there, but here we can see the narcotics traffickers covertly infiltrating the banking system, political parties and the media."

During December 1999 Castillo stood beside U.S. officials in Santo Domingo and announced the seizure of three drug-transporting planes owned by Mexican drug lord Luis Horacio Cano, a man indicted on 57 counts of narcotrafficking and convicted in U.S. federal court. According to a statement released by Castillo in March 2006, drug trafficking heightened its infiltration of the Dominican political parties and the Armed Forces because of the “paradise” and protection provided during Hipólito Mejía’s presidency (2000–2004), but the current authorities firmly fight it. In that regard, Castillo mentioned the 1,300 kilos of cocaine seized in December 2004 in the case against the ex-Army captain Quirino Paulino, who was extradited to the United States.

== Conflicts ==
Since 2005 Castillo has represented Ramón Báez Figueroa in the criminal proceedings for the US$2.7 billion embezzlement case which led to the collapse of the bank Baninter and unleashed the events causing one of the Dominican Republic's worst financial crisis in its history. The defunct Baninter's fraud cost the Dominican taxpayers more than RD$70 billion.

On December 19, 2005, Castillo made a RD$1 million check out to senator Hernani Salazar, to cover the civil damages ratified by the Supreme Court in a defamation lawsuit. The payment of the damages stems from Salazar’s case against Vincho, after the attorney publicly accused the heavyweight congressman of being linked to drug-trafficking suspect Quirino Paulino, via the ex-colonel Pedro Julio "Pepe" Goico, in a transaction of a US$1.8 million Colibri helicopter.
