= José Báez =

José Báez may refer to:

- Jose Baez (lawyer) (born 1968), American attorney
- José Báez (baseball) (born 1953), former baseball player
- José Luis Báez, Puerto Rican politician
