= Myrna Báez =

Puerto Rican painter and printmaker (1931–2018)

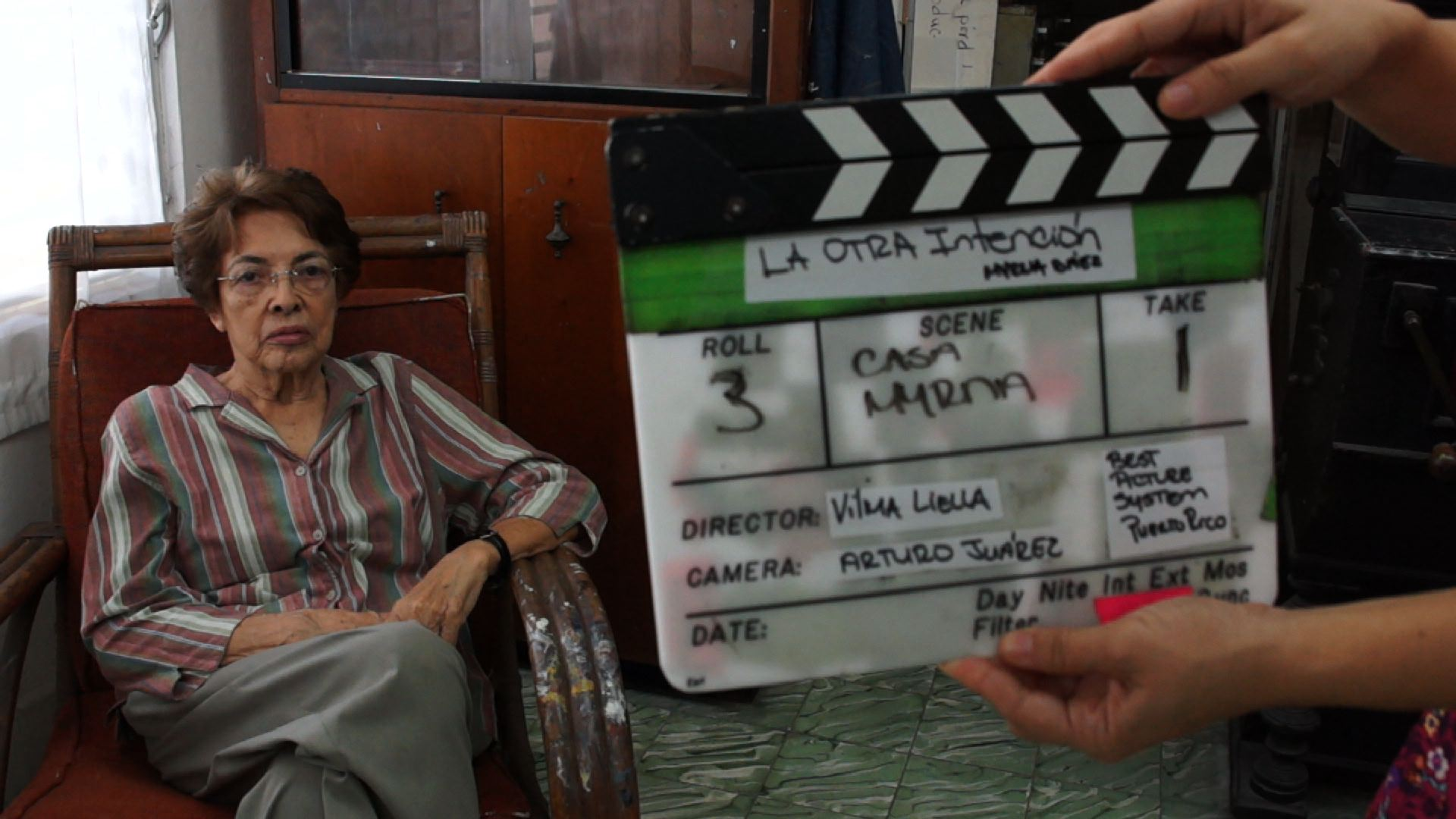
- Báez during the filming of "The Other Intention"
- Born: August 18, 1931; Santurce, Puerto Rico
- Died: September 24, 2018 (aged 87); Hato Rey, Puerto Rico
- Education: University of Puerto Rico; San Fernando Art Academy; Institute of Puerto Rican Culture; Pratt Institute
- Known for: Painting; Printmaking

Myrna Báez (born August 18, 1931 – September 24, 2018) was a Puerto Rican painter and printmaker, considered one of the most important visual artists in Puerto Rico. She has been instrumental in promoting art and art education in her country. Her work has been shown and collected by the Metropolitan Museum of Art, the Smithsonian American Art Museum and the Museum of Modern Art in New York. Her work has been characterized as confident and complex. She lived and worked in San Juan, Puerto Rico.

== Life and education ==
Báez was born in Santurce, Puerto Rico, to an upper-middle-class family and was one of five children. Her father, Enrique Báez was a civil engineer and her mother, America Gonzalez was a teacher and an independent and confident woman. Báez was strongly influenced by her mother. Her mother insisted that all of her children take classes in the arts and she exposed them to the theater and reading. Báez started painting classes at age nine. Báez was described as an intelligent and gifted child. She graduated from the Colegio Puertorriqueño de Niñas in 1947.

Báez received a bachelor's degree in the sciences from the University of Puerto Rico in 1951. She was exposed to many cultural and artistic movements while at the University. There had been a migration of many Spanish intellectuals and artists to Puerto Rico at the time and many of them were active around the University. She began to develop ideas about issues surrounding Puerto Rican independence. She believed that Puerto Rico should be an independent country. Báez attended political rallies and cultural events. Báez supported the woman's rights movement and identifies as a feminist.

Báez left for Spain, initially to study medicine but ended up completing studies on painting at the Royal Academy of San Fernando in Madrid. Before she arrived in Spain, she spent time in New York and Paris, immersing herself in the culture of both cities. In 1952, her passion for the arts led her to leave medical studies and pursue painting. She applied at the San Fernando Art Academy and was rejected, but she worked hard to build up her portfolio and was accepted in 1953. She received her master's degree in art from San Fernando Art Academy in 1957. Afterwards, she returned to Puerto Rico to study with graphic artist Lorenzo Homar at the Institute of Puerto Rican Culture in San Juan. Later, she studied at the Pratt Institute in Brooklyn from 1969 to 1970.

She died on September 24, 2018, following a heart attack, while in convalescence for a lung infection at Auxilio Mutuo Hospital, in Hato Rey, Puerto Rico. Her family had her remains cremated.

== Career and art ==
Báez's career started in 1957. She was a teacher of painting and drawing at schools in Puerto Rico between 1962 and 1987. From 1981 to 1987 she taught at the Art Students League in San Juan. Báez paints in both oil and acrylic. Báez's paintings are "softly painted" and "luminous." Her prints, especially her collotypes, are "rich" in texture and color.

Much of Báez's early art works, created during the 1960s, are described as "traditional images of Puerto Rico." During her earlier period of work, she often portrayed images of "everyday life" for "Puerto Rico's working-class people." She began to use more printmaking techniques, such as engraving and woodcuts. She later studied lithography and intaglio techniques with Dimitri Papagiourgi in Spain. She became influenced by impressionism, surrealism and abstract art, incorporating many of these aspects into her work.

Báez became interested in working with collotypes in the 1970s. During this time, the political climate of Puerto Rico had shifted. Her work began to focus on the new middle class. Art critic Margarita Fernández Zavala identifies class struggles in Báez's work which often explores urban themes and an emerging Puerto Rican bourgeoisie. There is a sense of uneasiness where individuals depicted in her portraits of this period seem unsure of their new economic and social status. Báez creates a sense of dichotomy with these pictures where the individuals portrayed don't seem to completely fit-in with their surroundings. They seem both at-odds with their world and, yet her vivid sense of color lifts them out of the ordinariness of everyday life.

The sense of space and how individuals fit into that created space is a trend that continues in her work. Báez creates multiple dimensions in her prints and paintings, using frames, reflections, pictures on walls and open windows to build layers of "unreal" space.

Báez has been influenced by the works of European masters, but locates her classically derived figures in Caribbean settings. She references great masters and re-imagines famous female nudes with intent to both disguise the figures and reveal them. Báez's portraits continue to question the idea of the male gaze. She paints women from a female perspective or a personal sense of understanding and which still imply a strong sense of her own identity as a woman. Her figures have been considered part of the field of socially concerned figurative painting.

Báez was one of the founding members of the Puerto Rican arts group, Hermandad de Artistas Gráficos in 1981. This group was initially established to protest government intervention in cultural matters.

Báez founded the fine arts program at the Universidad del Sagrado Corazón in Puerto Rico. Since 1988, she has been an artist-in-residence and is currently working there in an additional capacity as a professor.

In 1983 Báez was included in the exhibition Images and Identities: Art and Artists of Puerto Rican Heritage at Paul Robeson Galleries, Rutgers University-Newark.

=== Awards and honors ===
In December 2014, the annual Campechada cultural and artistic festival in Old San Juan was dedicated to Báez's career and work. This was the first time a living artist and a woman was celebrated by the festival.

- National Medal of Culture for Contributions in Art (1997)
- Honoris Causa Doctored Degree in Art from Universidad del Sagrado Corazón (2001)

== Quotes ==
"I do not want to do landscapes for tourists nor make pictures of the sentimental, nostalgic or folkloric things that people in this country suffer from due to a lack of identity. I am using landscape because I am interested in the form, because I'm interested in color, because I'm interested in the place... I'm interested in expressing: light—that which surrounds us, the shapes that have formed me, that have made me and that move me."
