= Banco León =

Banco León (Léon Bank) was a banking company in the Dominican Republic, which was formally introduced at a ceremony attended by former Dominican President Hipólito Mejía on December 2, 2003. The bank represents a union between the Banco Profesional and Banco Nacional de Credito (Bancredito). The Léon Jimenes family, which controls the León Jimenez Group, Ltd is better known for its distribution in the Dominican Republic of Marlboro cigarettes, as well as for their Aurora cigars and Presidente beer brands operations. The current president of the bank is Mr. Carlos Guillermo León, and its corporate headquarters are in Santo Domingo, Dominican Republic.

== Financial performance from 2004 to 2005 ==
From its beginnings the bank has embarked on a process of reconstruction with the goal of improving the financial situation of Bancrédito at the time of the acquisition. Net profits for 2005 amounted to RD$151.8 million, 37,9% more than 2004. Banco León operates 75 branches and 176 automatic teller machines throughout the country.

Consolidation of credit card operations, among other initiatives, generated the reduction of administrative expenses in excess of RD$100 million from 2004 to 2005 and the conversion of more than RD$5,000 million worth of unproductive assets into productive ones. According to the 2005 financial statement, the profit margin for the year was RD$697,9 million, 130% more than in 2004. Loans increased to RD$12,299 million, an increase of 30.6% since 2004. Capital reserves reached RD$1,668 million, a 10.4% increase with respect to 2004. Total deposits increased to RD$19,967 million, an increase of 4,1%, and a liquidity ratio of 39%, very superior to the required bank reserve of 20 percent.

== Activities ==
In an effort to obtain greater efficiency, during the 2005 Banco León consolidated credit card operations with those of the bank, relocated automatic branches and tellers to strategic locations and unified service centers. During February 2004 Banco León announced that it has now made available for commercial and personal clients a service by which property taxes can be paid to the Internal Taxes Agency from any locality via their Internet banking service. Recently, the Exchange Superintendence of the Dominican Republic announced on March 25, 2006, its approval for Banco Léon to issue public bonds for a total of RD$306 million. The recently approved bonds for Banco Leon were the first of 2006, with the offer mainly being addressed to institutional investors, pension funds and insurance companies.

== See also ==
- Banks of the Dominican Republic
