= Ciudad Universitaria, Distrito Nacional =

Ciudad Universitaria
- Location within the Dominican Republic
- Coordinates: 18°30′N 69°59′W
- Country: Dominican Republic
- Province: Distrito Nacional

Government
  - Mayor: Carolina Mejía (PRM)

Population (2008)
  - Total: 345,457
- Demonym: capitaleño/capitaleña
- Time zone: UTC−04:00
- Postal code: 10105
- Website: adn.gob.do (in Spanish)

Ciudad Universitaria is a Sector in the city of Santo Domingo in the Distrito Nacional of the Dominican Republic. There are eighteen universities in Ciudad Universitaria in the city of Santo Domingo, the highest number of any city in the Dominican Republic. Established in 1538, Universidad Autónoma de Santo Domingo (UASD) is the oldest university in the Americas and is also the only public university in the city. Santo Domingo holds the nation's highest percentage of residents with a higher education degree.

== Sources ==
- Distrito Nacional sectors
