= Quisqueya, Distrito Nacional =

Quisqueya
- Location within the Dominican Republic
- Coordinates: 18°30′N 69°59′W
- Country: Dominican Republic
- Province: Distrito Nacional

Government
  - Mayor: Carolina Mejía

Population (2008)
  - Total: 12,454
- Demonym: capitaleño/capitaleña
- Time zone: UTC-4 UTC
  - Summer (DST): UTCNone
- Website: adn.gob.do (in Spanish)

Ensanche Quisqueya is a sector or neighborhood in the city of Santo Domingo in the Distrito Nacional of the Dominican Republic. This neighborhood is in particular populated by individuals from the upper middle class.

== Sources ==
- Distrito Nacional sectors
