= Central Bank of the Dominican Republic =

Monetary authority of the Dominican Republic

Central Bank of the Dominican Republic Banco Central de la República Dominicana

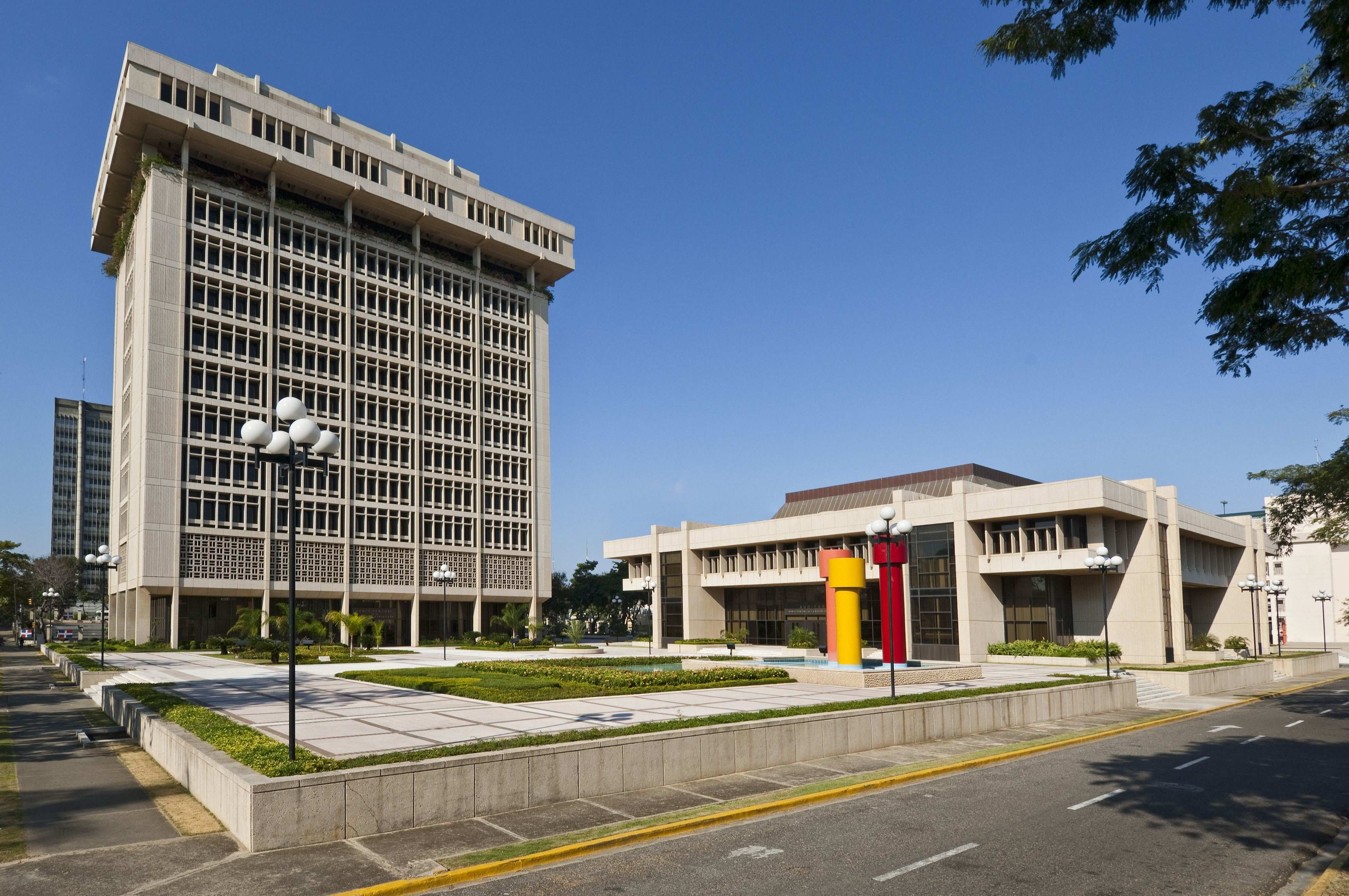
- Central Bank of the Dominican Republic Headquarters (2007)
- Central bank of: Dominican Republic
- Headquarters: Avenida Pedro Henríquez Ureña, esquina Avenida Leopoldo Navarro, Gascue, Santo Domingo, Distrito Nacional, 10205, Dominican Republic
- Coordinates: 18°28′23″N 69°54′22″W
- Established: October 9, 1947; 79 years ago
- Ownership: 100% state ownership
- Governing body: Monetary Board
- Key people: Héctor Valdez Albizu (Governor); Clarissa de la Rocha de Torres (Vice Governor)
- Currency: Dominican peso DOP (ISO 4217)
- Reserves: US$15.0472 billion (October 2026)
- Website: www.bancentral.gov.do (in Spanish and English)
- Central Bank of the Dominican Republic

Agency overview
- Jurisdiction: Dominican Republic
- Key document: Law No. 1529 (in Spanish)

The Central Bank of the Dominican Republic (Spanish: Banco Central de la República Dominicana, BCRD) was established by the Monetary and Banking Law of 1947 as the central bank of the Dominican Republic, responsible for regulating the country's monetary and banking system. The Bank's headquarters is in Santo Domingo, and its current governor is Héctor Valdez Albizu.

== Establishment and objectives ==
Organic Law no. 6142 of December 29, 1962, authorized the central bank to promote and maintain favorable monetary, foreign exchange and credit conditions for the stability and development of the national economy. The central bank's functions include regulating market liquidity levels by: determining deposit reserve requirements for banks; implementing lending limits when necessary; and issuing negotiable securities. Additional functions include controlling movements of the exchange rate and introducing resolutions pertaining to the financial system.

== Activities and structure ==
The BCRD implements all changes to banking regulation proposed by the Monetary Board (Junta Monetaria) which is the highest body of authority within the institution. The Board consists of ten members, all of which are appointed by the executive. The governor of the central bank heads the Monetary Board while the Ministry of Finance and the Ministry of Industry and Commerce each have a seat on the Board. The BCRD Governor is appointed by the executive for a period of two years, though with Héctor Valdez Albizu there has been continuity at this senior post for several years despite political administration changes. Albizu was the BCRD governor from 1994 until 2000, again holding the post from August 2004.

Since late 1993, BCRD has worked with the sponsorship of the Inter-American Development Bank to improve several areas of banking practice.

== Performance and reform since the 1990s ==
Monetary policy during the 1990s was conducted within a framework of limited central bank autonomy and a managed floating exchange rate regime. A key objective of the BCDR was price stability in conjunction with real output growth and reserve accumulation, such that the stock of BCRD net domestic assets became the targeted policy instrument. Liquidity was managed directly through credit controls and freezing asset reserves. BCRD also intervened in the private foreign exchange market, smoothing the volatility of the exchange rate. However, the monetary authorities recently moved towards the interest rate as its indirect monetary policy instrument, namely through issuing central bank paper (certificados de participacion), with prices determined at auction.

The macroeconomic situation suffered a major shock in 2003 with the banking crisis and subsequent bail out by the BCRD, which guaranteed all Baninter (one of the major banks that failed) deposits and providing liquidity to two other banks at a total cost to the budget equivalent to 21 percent of the GDP. The banking crisis led to a major capital flight, a sharp currency depreciation, high inflation and significant fiscal pressures (exacerbated by an ongoing electricity crisis), together creating large macroeconomic imbalances and an environment of uncertainty and perceived risk. In October 2003 the BCRD raised the commission on foreign exchange transactions for purchasing imported goods to 10 percent and subsequently to 13 percent at the beginning of 2005.

== Governors ==
- Jesús María Troncoso, 1947–1951
- Wenceslao Troncoso, 1951–1952
- Manuel Ruiz Tejada, 1952–1953
- José Ernesto García, 1953
- S. Salvador Ortiz, 1953–1954
- José Joaquín Gómez, 1954–1956
- Milton Messina, 1956–1957
- Arturo Despradel, 1957–1958
- Juan A. Morales, 1958
- Virgilio Álvarez Sánchez, 1958–1959
- Oscar G. Ginebra Henríquez, 1958–1960
- Manuel V. Ramos, 1960–1961
- Silvestre Alba de Moya, 1961
- A. Amado Hernández, 1961–1962
- José Joaquín Gómez, 1962–1963
- Diógenes H. Fernández, 1963–1976
- Fernando Periche, 1976–1978
- Eduardo Fernández, 1978–1980
- Carlos Despradel, 1980–1982
- Bernardo Vega, 1982–1984
- José Santos Taveras, 1984
- Hugo Guiliani Cury, 1984–1986
- Luis Julián Pérez, 1986–1987
- Roberto Saladín, 1987–1989
- Guillermo Caram Herrera, 1989–1990
- Luis F. Toral Córdoba, 1990–1993
- Mario Read Vittini, 1993–1994
- Héctor Valdez Albizu, 1994–2000
- Francisco Guerrero Prats-Ramírez, 2000–2003
- José Lois Malkún, 2003–2004
- Héctor Valdez Albizu, 2004–present

== See also ==
- Banks of the Dominican Republic
- List of central banks
