= Ramón Báez (politician) =

Former Provisional President of the Dominican Republic

Ramón Báez Machado
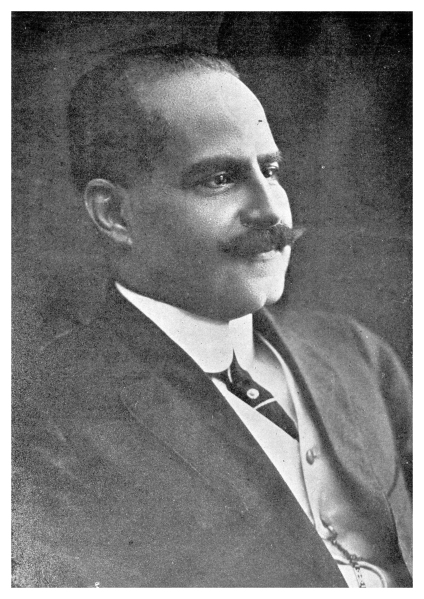

President of the Dominican Republic
- In office August 28, 1914 – December 5, 1914
- Preceded by: José Bordas Valdez
- Succeeded by: Juan Isidro Jimenes

Personal details
- Born: December 24, 1858 Mayagüez, Captaincy General of Puerto Rico
- Died: March 4, 1929 (aged 70) Santo Domingo, Dominican Republic
- Party: Red Party
- Relations: Marcos Antonio Cabral (brother-in-law); Virgins of Galindo (cousins-in-law)
- Children: Buenaventura Baez Soler and Mercedes Baez Soler

Ramón Báez Machado (December 24, 1858 – March 4, 1929) was a physician and politician from the Dominican Republic. He served as provisional president of the Dominican Republic from 28 August until 5 December 1914. He served as the President of Chamber of Deputies of the Dominican Republic in 1903. He was the son of president Buenaventura Báez. He later served as a public official under several cabinets including the government of President Horacio Vásquez.

He died in Santo Domingo on March 4, 1929.

== Ancestry ==
Báez is descended by his mother, 'Conchita' Machado from the Spanish conquistadors Rodrigo de Bastidas and Gonzalo Fernández de Oviedo y Valdés, and by his father, President Buenaventura Báez, from the Jesuit priest and historian Antonio Sánchez Valverde.

- Ramón Buenaventura Báez Méndez (1812–1884)
  - Teodoro Osvaldo Buenaventura Báez Machado (1857–?)
    - José Ramón Báez López-Penha (1909–1995)
    - Buenaventura Báez López-Penha
      - Marcos Antonio Báez Cocco
      - Ana Josefina Báez Cocco
        - Monika De Marchena Báez
          - Juan Rafael Vargas De Marchena
        - Patricia De Marchena Báez
        - Freddy III de Marchena Báez
          - Freddy Alejandro IV de Marchena Grullón
        - Jimena De Marchena Báez
      - Soraya Báez Cocco
        - Jesus Báez
      - Alejandro Antonio Báez Cocco
  - Ramón Báez Machado (1858–1929)
    - Buenaventura Báez Soler
      - Ramón Báez Romano
        - Ramón Buenaventura Báez Figueroa (b. 1956)
          - Ramón Buenaventura Báez Zeller (b. 1982)
          - José Ramón Báez Alvarez (b.1999)
        - José Miguel Báez Figueroa
          - Raquel Cristina Báez Rauch (b. 1985)
          - José Miguel Báez Rauch (b. 1988)
            - Gina Sofía Báez Castro (b. 2022)
            - Ana Amelia Báez Castro (b. 2023)
    - Mercedes Báez Soler
      - Julio Ernesto de la Rocha Báez
        - Ramón de la Rocha Pimentel (b. 1951)
        - Clarissa Altagracia de la Rocha Pimentel de Torres (b. 1959)

Ancestors of Ramón Báez (politician)

16. Miguel Sánchez de Valverde y Martínez de Rivera
8. Antonio Sánchez Valverde
17. Clara Díaz de Ocaña y Frías
4. Pablo Altagracia Báez
2. Buenaventura Báez Méndez
5. Teresa de Jesús Méndez
1. Ramón Báez Machado
24. Manuel Machado Verdugo (1720-1797)
12. Miguel José Machado y Ricardo (1754–1841)
25. Maria Manuela Ricardo y Guillen de Arjona (1735-1795)
6. Coronel Manuel José Machado Brito (=44; 1783–1857)
26. Pedro Brito
13. Micaela Antonia Brito y Pérez-Caro (1767–1849)
27. Ana Teresa Pérez-Caro y Fernández de Oviedo
3. Mª de la Concepción Machado Peralta (1823–1902)
28. Manuel de Peralta
14. Manuel de Peralta Jordan (1752-1832)
29.Maria Jordan
7. María Jacoba Peralta Mañón (=45; 1788–1844)
30. Antonio Mañón de Lara (1728-1800)
15. María de la Concepción Mañón y de Mieses-Ponce de León
31. Teresa de Mieses-Ponce de León y Pérez-Caro (†1767)
