= Banco Intercontinental =

Commercial bank in the Dominican Republic

Banco Intercontinental, S. A.
- Type: Private
- Industry: Banking
- Founded: 1986
- Defunct: 2003
- Headquarters: Santo Domingo, Dominican Republic
- Key people: Ramón Báez Figueroa

Banco Intercontinental (or BANINTER) was the second largest privately held commercial bank in the Dominican Republic before collapsing in 2003 in a fraud tied to political corruption.

== Ramón Báez Figueroa and expansion of BANINTER ==
Ramón Báez Romano, a businessman and former industry minister, founded Banco Intercontinental in 1986. Later, Ramón Báez Figueroa took over the bank.

The BANINTER Group owned Listín Diario, four television stations, a cable television company, and more than 70 radio stations.

== Bank crisis ==
On April 7, 2003, the government took control of BANINTER.

Báez Figueroa was arrested on May 15, 2003, along with BANINTER vice presidents Marcos Báez Cocco and Vivian Lubrano de Castillo, the secretary of the Board of Directors, Jesús M. Troncoso, and Luis Alvarez Renta, on charges of bank fraud, money laundering, and concealing information from the government as part of a fraud scheme of more than RD$55 billion (US$2.23 billion). The sum was equivalent to two-thirds of the national budget of the Dominican Republic at the time of the event.

The resulting central bank bailout spurred a 30% annual inflation and a large increase in poverty. The government was forced to devalue the peso, triggering the collapse of two other banks and prompting a US$600 million (420 million €) loan package from the International Monetary Fund.

Though required by the country's monetary laws to only guarantee individual deposits of up to RD$500,000 (about US$21,000 at the time) placed within the country, the Dominican Central Bank opted to guarantee all $2.2B in unbacked BANINTER deposits, regardless of the amount or whether deposits were in Dominican pesos or American dollars, and without apparent knowledge of whether the deposits were held in the Dominican Republic or in BANINTER's branches in the Cayman Islands and Panama. The subsequent fiscal shortfall resulted in massive inflation (42%) and the devaluation of the DOP by over 100%.

Former president Mejía and the Central Bank (Banco Central) stated that the unlimited payouts to depositors were to protect the Dominican banking system from a crisis of confidence and potential chain reaction. However, the overall consequence of the bailout was to reimburse the wealthiest of Dominican depositors, some of whom had received rates of interest as high as 27% annually, at the expense of the majority of poor Dominicans—the latter of whom would be required to pay the cost of the bailout through inflation, currency devaluation, government austerity plans, and higher taxes over the coming years.

== Aftermath and trial ==
The banking crisis ignited harsh fights over the BANINTER group's media outlets, including the prominent newspaper Listín Diario, which was temporarily seized and run by the Mejía administration following the bank collapse. In 2003, TV commentator Rafael Acevedo, president of the opinion polling firm Gallup Dominicana, had said that in the BANINTER scandal "there has been much complicity at every level of society: the government, the media, the church, and the military."

In November 2005, Alvarez Renta was found liable by a federal jury in Miami of civil racketeering and illegal money transfers in a conspiracy to loot BANINTER during its final months of existence. The Dominican state ordered Alvarez Renta to pay $177 million. He has yet to pay that sum.

The main executives of BANINTER, Báez Figueroa, his cousin Marcos Báez Cocco, Vivian Lubrano, and Jesús Troncoso Ferrúa, as well as the aforementioned Alvarez Renta, were prosecuted by the Dominican state for fraud and money laundering, among other criminal charges. Báez Figueroa's main attorney is Marino Vinicio Castillo, who at the present time holds the position of President Fernandez's drugs consultant.

With 350 prosecutions and defense witnesses slated to testify, ex-president Hipólito Mejía among them, the criminal proceedings against Báez Figueroa began on April 2, 2006. However, the Court decided to postpone the first hearing for May 19, 2006, accepting a motion by the defense lawyers. It was prompted, as detailed at length in the trial, by a scandal involving debt write-offs and sweetheart loans or other financial deals suspected of having favored leading politicians and others.

What remains most curious was that the fraud went undetected for 14 years by the country's supposed financial gatekeepers—the Central Bank, the Superintendent of Banks, and U.S. accounting company PricewaterhouseCoopers. How Báez Figueroa and his cronies were accused and some convicted of pulling it off provided a glimpse into the gift-giving and favor-swapping common between private business and top government officials in the Dominican Republic. The first trial ended in September 2007.

=== Sentence and criticism ===
On October 21, 2007, Báez Figueroa was sentenced by a three-judge panel to 10 years in prison. Additionally, he was ordered to pay restitution and damages totaling RD$63 billion. The laundering charges were excluded, but the other suspected mastermind of the fraud, Luis Alvarez Renta, was convicted and sentenced to 10 years in prison for money laundering. Marcos Báez Cocco, ex-vice president of the bank, was also found guilty and sentenced to 8 years.

The court dismissed the accusations against two other defendants: former BANINTER executive Vivian Lubrano and Jesús M. Troncoso, the secretary of the BANINTER Board of Directors, for lack of evidence.

The sentence has been widely criticized for its severe contradictions, but more specifically because it has been alleged that the judges were pressed by "the powers that be." Noted journalist Miguel Guerrero wrote in his column of the daily El Caribe that the defrauders of BANINTER have been protected "by a dark combination of political, economic, mediatic, and ecclesiastical powers" and that the sentence was a "mamotreto." In fact, Guerrero went to the extent of saying that everything was fixed beforehand, and the defendants and their lawyers knew it, as did those representing the Central Bank.

=== Court of Appeals and Supreme Court decisions ===
In February 2008, the case went to the Court of Appeals of Santo Domingo, and the court upheld the sentence against Báez Figueroa, Báez Cocco, and Alvarez Renta. The decision that had favored Vivian Lubrano was reverted, and she was sentenced to five years in prison and RD$18 billion in damages. Charges against Troncoso Ferrua were definitely dropped.

In July 2008, the Dominican Supreme Court confirmed the decision against the defendants.

Nevertheless, Lubrano allegedly fell into a "deep depression" and suffered from "panic attacks," and she never went to prison. After much debate, President Leonel Fernández gave her a full pardon on December 22, 2008.
