= El Caribe (Dominican Republic) =

Daily newspaper

- Type: Daily newspaper
- Founder: Stanley Ralph Ross
- Founded: April 14, 1948
- Language: Spanish
- City: Santo Domingo
- Website: elcaribe.com.do

El Caribe is a Spanish-language daily newspaper published in Santo Domingo. It was founded on April 14, 1948 by Stanley Ralph Ross. El Caribe covers domestic, national, and international news, and comprises opinion pieces, investigative reports, and reviews.

== History ==
El Caribe’s owner until 1954 was Rafael Trujillo, then president of the Dominican Republic. Its founding editor-in-chief was Rafael Herrera.

In 2021, El Caribe was the third non-American newspaper whose newspaper library was digitized by the Center for Research Libraries.
