= Ramón Báez Romano =

Dominican businessman, golfer and politician (1929–2022)

Ramón Báez Romano (4 March 1929 – 7 March 2022) was a Dominican businessman, politician, and golfer. Coming from one of the most influential families in the Dominican Republic, he was Minister of Industry and Trade during the administration of President Antonio Guzmán. He was CEO of Rosario Dominicana, Baninter, and Listín Diario, among others.

Romano was born on 4 March 1929. He is a member of the Dominican Golf Hall of Fame. Romano died on 7 March 2022, three days after his 93rd birthday.

== Ancestry ==
Báez was a descendant of Spanish conquistadors Rodrigo de Bastidas and Gonzalo Fernández de Oviedo y Valdés, the Dominican presidents Buenaventura Báez and Ramón Báez, and the Jesuit priest and historian Antonio Sánchez Valverde (who had an illegitimate son with a married woman).

Ancestors of Ramón Báez Romano

16. Pablo Altagracia Báez
8. Buenaventura Báez Méndez
17. Teresa de Jesús Méndez
4. Ramón Báez Machado
18. Manuel José Machado Brito (1783–1857)
9. Mª de la Concepción Machado Peralta (1823–1902)
19. María Jacoba Peralta Mañón (1788–1844)
2. Buenaventura Báez Soler
20. Félix Soler
10. Félix Eduardo Soler Rodríguez (1843–1924)
21. Jerónima Rodríguez Moreno
5. Natalia Soler Machado
22. Manuel José Machado Peralta (1814–1872; son of #18 and 19)
11. Carolina de las Mercedes Machado Echavarría (1843–1903; cousin of #4)
23. Mª de la Concepción Echavarría Vilaseca
1. Ramón Báez Romano
3. Estela Romano Martínez
