= Milton Morris (disambiguation) =

Milton Morris (1924–2019) was an Australian politician.

Milton Morris may also refer to:

- Milton Morris (American politician)
- Milton Morris (music club proprietor) (1911–1983)

== See also ==
- Milton Morrison (born 1975), Dominican businessperson and politician
