= Margarita Cedeño =

Vice President of the Dominican Republic from 2012 to 2020

- Cedeño in 2013

39th Vice President of the Dominican Republic
- In office 16 August 2012 – 16 August 2020
- President: Danilo Medina
- Preceded by: Rafael Alburquerque
- Succeeded by: Raquel Peña

53rd First Lady of the Dominican Republic
- In role 16 August 2004 – 16 August 2012
- President: Leonel Fernández
- Preceded by: Rosa Gómez de Mejía
- Succeeded by: Cándida Montilla

Personal details
- Born: Margarita María Cedeño Lizardo; 1 May 1965 (age 61) Santo Domingo, Dominican Republic
- Citizenship: Dominican
- Party: Dominican Liberation Party
- Spouse: Leonel Fernández (m. 2003–div. 2022)
- Children: Ramón Emil Fiorentino; Gabriela Angelissa Fiorentino; Yolanda América María Fernández
- Parents: Luis Emilio Cedeño Matos (1925–2018) (father); Angela Margarita Lizardo Olivares (mother)
- Education: Autonomous University of Santo Domingo (LLB); Pontificia Universidad Católica Madre y Maestra (M.A.); University of Salamanca (M.A.)
- Occupation: Philanthropist, politician
- Profession: Lawyer
- Website: https://margarita.do

Margarita María Cedeño Lizardo, formerly known as Margarita Cedeño de Fernández, is a Dominican politician who served as Vice President of the Dominican Republic from 2012 to 2020. She was married to former president, Leonel Fernández and served as the First Lady of the Dominican Republic from 2004 to 2012.

== Early and personal life ==
Cedeño was born on 1 May 1965 in Santo Domingo to Luis Emilio Cedeño Matos and Angela Margarita Lizardo Olivares. She worked with local law firms in the Dominican Republic, among which the law firm of Doctor Abel Rodríguez del Orbe and Fernández y Asociados, where she is an associate member. During the years 1996–2000, she assisted as legal counselor to the president nominated as sub-secretary of state. Besides being ad honorem counselor and director of the Legal and Investment Environment Management of the Office for the Promotion of Foreign Investment of the Dominican Republic.

She has a bachelor's in law from the Autonomous University of Santo Domingo and a master's in economic Llllegislation from the Pontificia Universidad Católica Madre y Maestra. She also has participated in courses and seminars at Georgetown and Harvard University in the United States and Geneva University in Switzerland.

On 16 October 2009, Cedeño was named Goodwill Ambassador of the Food and Agriculture Organization of the United Nations (FAO).

== Political career ==
When she was the First Lady (2004–2012), she and her staff coordinated social policies for her husband's administration, generating programs of health and education for children, young people, single mothers and families, in general, as a key element in society.

=== 2012 presidential election ===
On April 10, 2011, in a meeting of the Central Committee (Comité Central) of the Dominican Liberation Party, she registered her pre-candidature for the 2012 presidential elections. She was elected vice president to Danilo Medina on 20 May 2012. She became the second woman to serve as vice president after Milagros Ortiz Bosch was elected under former president Hipólito Mejía in 2000–2004.

== See also ==
- Luis Abinader
- Leonel Fernández
- Danilo Medina
- Luis Almagro
- Adriano Espaillat
- Geovanny Vicente
- Tom Pérez
- Faride Raful
- José Ignacio Paliza

== Notes ==
Political offices
Preceded by Rafael Alburquerque	Vice President of the Dominican Republic; 2012–2020	Succeeded by Raquel Peña de Antuña
