= Félix Cruz Jiminián =

Philanthropist and Physician

- Born: Félix Antonio Cruz Jiminián; November 19, 1951 (age 74); Jarabacoa, Dominican Republic
- Occupation: Doctor of Medicine

Félix Antonio Cruz Jiminián (Jarabacoa, November 19, 1951), better known as Dr. Cruz Jiminián, is a Dominican doctor of medicine, philanthropist and businessman.

== Early years ==
Dr. Félix Antonio Cruz Jiminián was born in Jarabacoa, on November 19, 1951. He is the son of Luis Cruz Collado and María Jiminian. He entered the Saint Thomas Aquinas Seminary to become a priest, although he later gave up the idea to become a doctor. Cruz Jiminián graduated in 1980 from the Autonomous University of Santo Domingo, with the title of doctor of medicine. When he finished his studies, he built a small office that only had a wooden table and a desk.

== Philanthropy ==
Cruz Jiminián is the founder of the Cruz Jiminián Clinic and Foundation located in the Cristo Rey slum, Dominican Republic. Despite not being a public hospital, the Cruz Jiminián clinic, like the foundation, is characterized by providing its patients with free quality services. Through these, Dr. Cruz Jiminián implements social assistance programs such as: cleft lip and palate surgery, imperforate anus, hydrocephalus, double sex, dental modules, medical operations, area for tuberculosis, vaccination area, dining room for the elderly, renal hemodialysis area, area for late birth declarations.

In 2015, Dr. Cruz Jiminián inaugurated with the Dominican President Danilo Medina the largest medical office building in the country to expand the medical and social services that he has offered for more than 30 years through his clinic and foundation.

== Acknowledgments ==
The National Human Rights Commission created the Supreme Laurel de Oro, Altruism and Peace award, in the Degree Doctor Félix Antonio Cruz Jiminián. He was also awarded as a Philanthropist of Dominican Medicine, by the Autonomous University of Santo Domingo

- 2010, he was recognized as "The Man of the Year" by the Grupo Omnimedia and the Diario Libre newspaper.
- 2013, the Council of Aldermen of the National District of the country declared him adopted son of the city of Santo Domingo.
- 2016, Dr. Juan Cabrera Abreu, wrote a 354-page book called An unforgettable story dedicated to the life of Dr. Cruz Jiminián.
- In 2018, the former mayor of the Distrito Nacional, David Collado, inaugurated a park in the Parabel sector to honor Félix Cruz Jiminián.
