= Abel Martínez =

Abel Martínez may refer to:

- Abel Martínez (footballer)
- Abel Martínez (politician)
