= María Acevedo =

María Acevedo may refer to:

- María Candelaria Acevedo (born 1958), Chilean politician
- Maria Dolores Acevedo (1932–1998), Spanish Galician writer
- María Paula Acevedo Guzmán (1932–2021), Dominican activist
- María Payá Acevedo (born 1989), Cuban activist for freedom and human rights

== See also ==
- Mario Acevedo (born 1969), Guatemalan football forward
