= Cándida Montilla =

First lady of the Dominican Republic

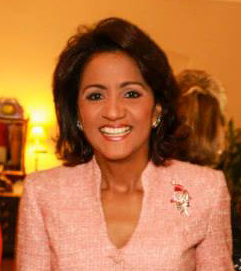
- Montilla in 2015

First Lady of the Dominican Republic
- In role 16 August 2012 – 16 August 2020
- President: Danilo Medina
- Preceded by: Margarita Cedeño
- Succeeded by: Raquel Arbaje

Personal details
- Born: Cándida Montilla Espinal; 3 October 1962 (age 64) Santo Domingo, Dominican Republic
- Party: Dominican Liberation Party
- Spouse: Danilo Medina (m. 1987)
- Children: Candy Sibeli; Vanessa Daniela; Ana Paula
- Education: Universidad Católica Santo Domingo (Lic.)
- Occupation: Psychologist

Cándida Montilla Espinal de Medina (born 3 October 1962) is a Dominican clinical psychologist. The wife of former president, Danilo Medina. Montilla served as the First Lady of the Dominican Republic from 2012 to 2020.

== Biography ==
=== Education and personal life ===
Montilla de Medina was born on 3 October 1962 in Santo Domingo, where she has resided for most of her life. She graduated from Universidad Católica de Santo Domingo and became a clinical psychologist, specializing in family therapy. She also studied human resource management at the Beck Institute for Cognitive Behavior Therapy in suburban Philadelphia, Pennsylvania. She had conducted studies and seminars within her fields, including at the INCAE Business School in Costa Rica.

Montilla married her husband, Danilo Medina, in 1987. They have three daughters: Candy Sibely, Vanessa Daniela and Ana Paula.

=== Career ===
From 2004 until August 2012, Cándida Montilla de Medina served as the founder and founding director of the Department of Human Development and Family Integration (PDHIF) at the Central Bank of the Dominican Republic. She left that position to become the country's First Lady in August 2012.

Montilla de Medina actively campaigned on behalf of her husband during the 2012 Dominican Republic presidential election. She chaired a group called "Mujeres Creciendo con Danilo" (Women Growing with Danilo), to focus on women voters to Medina's candidacy and the Dominican Liberation Party (PLD). Cándida Montilla de Medina assumed the role of First Lady of the Dominican Republic on August 16, 2012, when Danilo Medina assumed the presidency. She focused on healthcare and social issues, including care for children and the elderly, education, and women's affairs during her tenure.

Honorary titles
Preceded by Margarita Cedeño de Fernández	First Lady of the Dominican Republic; 2012–2020	Succeeded by Raquel Arbaje
