= Rafael Alburquerque =

Dominican politician

His Excellency Rafael Alburquerque
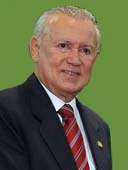

38th Vice President of the Dominican Republic
- In office 16 August 2004 – 16 August 2012
- President: Leonel Fernández
- Preceded by: Milagros Ortiz Bosch
- Succeeded by: Margarita Cedeño de Fernández

Secretary of Labor
- In office 16 August 1996 – 16 August 2000
- President: Leonel Fernández
- Preceded by: Dr. Juan Arístides Taveras Guzmán
- Succeeded by: Milton Ray
- In office 4 March 1991 – 5 May 1996
- President: Joaquín Balaguer
- Preceded by: Dr. Washington De Peña
- Succeeded by: Dr. Juan Arístides Taveras Guzmán

Personal details
- Born: 14 June 1940 (age 86) Santo Domingo, Dominican Republic
- Party: Dominican Liberation Party
- Spouse: Martha Montes de Oca
- Education: Universidad Autónoma de Santo Domingo

Rafael Francisco Alburquerque de Castro (born June 14, 1940) is a Dominican politician who was Vice President of the Dominican Republic from August 2004 to August 2012, serving under President Leonel Fernández. Along with Fernández, he was re-elected in May 2008 for a four-year term. Before he became Vice President, he was Secretary of Labour twice between 1991 and 2000 under Presidents Joaquín Balaguer and during Fernández's first term.

== Early life and career ==
Alburquerque was born in Santo Domingo on 14 June 1940, the eldest son of Lic. Rafael Alburquerque Zayas-Bazán. He serves as Coordinator of the Social security System and the Social Cabinet of the Dominican government. He was chosen by the President Leonel Fernández Reyna as his ballot companion for his second consecutive presidential term, by the Dominican Liberation Party (PLD).

Alburquerque served as Secretary of Labour and president of the Delegation of the Dominican State to the Conferences of the International Labour Organization (ILO) from 1991 to 2000. He was also President of the Commission of Technical Cooperation in the Conference of the ILO in 1999. From September 2000 to June 2001 he was the Special Representative of the General Director of the ILO for the collaboration with Colombia and Member of the Commission of Experts of the ILO since November 2001. Alburquerque is a lawyer with a PhD in Labour Law.

=== 2012 pre-presidential candidacy ===
A study by a local pollster in January 2011, to the closed question: "Of the following political leaders of the PLD, who is the best candidate for the 2012 elections?" 46.7% said Danilo Medina; 32% Rafael Alburquerque%; 7.4% Francisco Domínguez Brito; 6.7% José Tomás Pérez. Alburquerque, Camilo, Segura and Javier García have made public aspirations for the presidential nomination. Absent from the polls is the President of the Republic and former president of the PLD Leonel Fernández since he is constitutionally prohibited from reelection for 2012. On May 22, 2011, he declined his candidacy to support Danilo Medina.

== Books ==
Alburquerque is the author of several books:

- Legislación del Trabajo (1985)
- Los Conflictos del Trabajo y su solución en la República Dominicana (1987)
- Estudios del derecho del Trabajo (1992), with prologue by Rafael Caldera, twice president of Venezuela
- Derecho Administrativo Laboral y Administrativo del Trabajo (1993)
- Derecho del Trabajo (Volume I - 1995 y 2003; Volume II - 1997; Volume III - 1999)
- Guía de los derechos de los trabajadores (1995, with eight editions)
- Los conflictos de las leyes del trabajo en el espacio (1998)
- La subordinación jurídica en la era digital (2002).

== Notes ==
Political offices
Preceded by Dr. Washington De Peña	Secretary of Labor; March 4, 1991 – May 5, 1996	Succeeded by Dr. Juan Arístides Taveras Guzmán
Preceded by Dr. Juan Arístides Taveras Guzmán	Secretary of Labor; August 16, 1996 – August 16, 2000	Succeeded by Milton Ray Guevara
Preceded by Milagros Ortiz Bosch	Vice President of the Dominican Republic; August 16, 2004 – August 16, 2012	Succeeded by Margarita Cedeño de Fernández
