= María Paula Acevedo Guzmán =

Dominican activist and First Lady of the Dominican Republic (1932–2021)

First Lady of the Dominican Republic
- In office May 4, 1965 – August 30, 1965
- President: Francisco Caamaño
- Preceded by: Military Triumvirate
- Succeeded by: Matilde Pastoriza Espaillat

Personal details
- Born: María Paula Acevedo Guzmán; June 30, 1932 San Pedro de Macorís, Dominican Republic
- Died: January 7, 2021 (aged 88) Santo Domingo, Dominican Republic
- Spouse: Francisco Caamaño (m. 1958; died 1973)
- Children: Alberto Alexander; Francis Alexander; Paola Alexandra

María Paula Acevedo Guzmán, known as Chichita and Chichita Caamaño, (June 30, 1932 – January 7, 2021) was a Dominican activist and First Lady of the Dominican Republic from May 4, 1965, to August 30, 1965. Acevedo was the wife of Colonel Francisco Caamaño, who became the constitutional President of the Dominican Republic during the Dominican Civil War of 1965. Caamaño was one of the leaders of the movement to restore the democratically elected former president, Juan Bosch, who had been overthrown in a military coup d'état in September 1963.

== Biography ==
Acevedo was born in the city of San Pedro de Macorís on June 30, 1932. Her parents were Fernando Acevedo and María Guzmán. She was raised in San Pedro de Macorís and attended several of the city's schools, including the José Trujillo Valdez, Gastón Fernando Deligne and José Joaquín Pérez schools.

She met her future husband, a Dominican Navy ensign named Francisco Caamaño, when she was 18 years old. The couple dated for several years and married in 1958 when she was 26. They had three children - Alberto Alexander, Francis Alexander and Paola Alexandra (born 1967). The family lived in a home on Pedro Livio Cedeño Avenue until the outbreak of the April Revolution and Dominican Civil War on April 24, 1965.

On April 24, 1965, Acevedo received a phone call summoning her husband, Colonel Francisco Caamaño, who quickly left to join the unfolding Constitutionalists-led April Revolution against the military triumvirate government of President Donald Reid Cabral and General Elías Wessin y Wessin. Fearing for her family's safety, Acevedo took her two children and fled to a friend's home, never to return to their original home on Pedro Livio Cedeño Avenue. Two days later on April 26, 1965, Caamaño and his allies, fearing kidnapping plot, whisked Acevedo and her two children to the Embassy of Argentina in Santo Domingo for their security (along with the family members of Colonel Manuel Ramón Montes Arache, a Caamaño ally).

Acevedo, who remained in hiding at the Argentine embassy, found out that she would be the new First Lady on May 3, 1965, when the Congress of the Dominican Republic, led by Constitucionalistas loyal to former President Juan Bosch, elected Caamaño as the new, acting president of the Dominican Republic. Her husband was sworn in on May 4, 1965, and Acevedo, who was 32-years old at the time, became first lady following a presidential inauguration ceremony in Independencia Park in Santo Domingo.

A few days after the inauguration, President Francisco Caamaño moved his family from the Argentine embassy to a new, heavily guarded residence located on the corner of Sánchez and Mercedes streets in the Ciudad Colonial, where they lived for the remainder of his presidency and the civil war. Acevedo, or Chichita Caamaño as she was known, took up the role of First Lady of the Dominican Republic, which was overshadowed by the ongoing Dominican Civil War and the political crisis. She visited the Padre Billini hospital and the Abel González clinic to meet with wounded patients during the war. She was known to pray for an end to the conflict at the Basilica Cathedral of Santa María la Menor.

Following United States intervention and several months of attacks, Francisco Caamaño accepted an agreement to step down from office on August 30, 1965. An agreement was signed, ending the Dominican Civil War on September 3, 1965. As part of the truce, the new provisional president, Héctor García-Godoy, sent Colonel Francisco Caamaño out of the country to become a military attache at the Embassy of the Dominican Republic in London on January 22, 1966. María Paula Acevedo Guzmán also moved to London with her husband and their two children. She gave birth to their third child, a daughter named Paola, in 1967.

Francisco Caamaño was executed in 1973.

María Paula Acevedo Guzmán died on January 7, 2021, at the age of 87 following several years of declining health. Her funeral and viewing were held at the Blandino funeral home on Abraham Lincoln Avenue in Santo Domingo on January 8, 2021.
