= Francisco Caamaño =

Dominican soldier and revolutionary leader during the 1965 Civil War

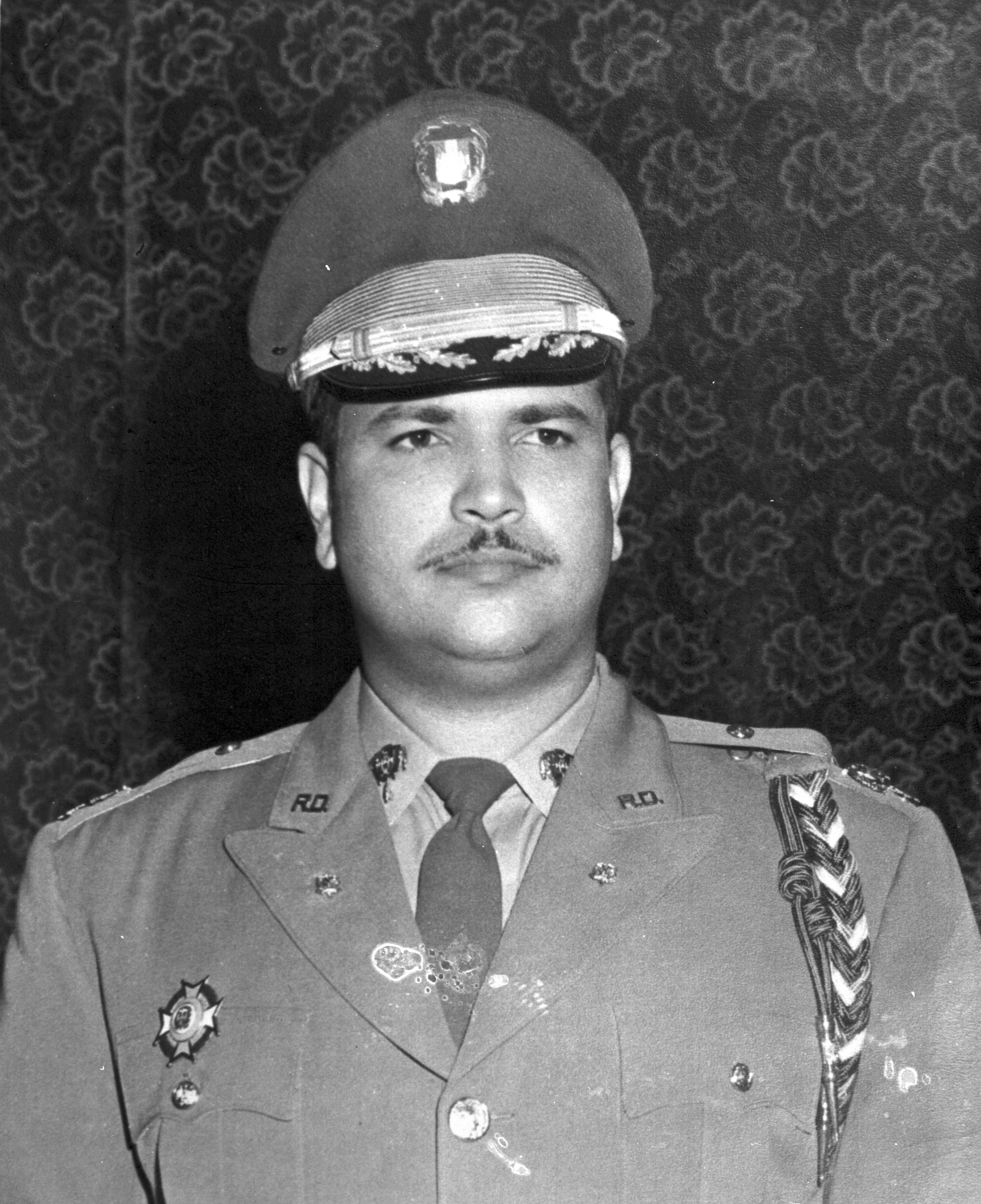
- Caamaño in 1965

President of the Dominican Republic (parallel to the Government of National Reconstruction)
- In office May 4, 1965 – August 30, 1965
- Preceded by: Triumvirate
- Succeeded by: Héctor García-Godoy (interim)

Personal details
- Born: June 11, 1932 San Juan de la Maguana
- Died: February 16, 1973 (aged 40) San José de Ocoa
- Cause of death: Execution
- Spouse: María Paula Acevedo Guzmán (m. 1958)
- Relations: Danilo Medina (second-cousin); Lucía Medina (second-cousin); Claudio Caamaño Grullón (first cousin-once removed); Claudio Caamaño Vélez (first cousin-twice removed)
- Children: Alberto Alexander; Francis Alexander; Paola Alexandra
- Occupation: Soldier, politician

Military service
- Allegiance: Dominican Republic
- Branch/service: Dominican Navy
- Years of service: 1949–1965
- Rank: Colonel

Col. Francisco Alberto Caamaño Deñó (June 11, 1932 – February 16, 1973) was a Dominican soldier and politician who took the constitutional presidency of the Dominican Republic during the Civil War of 1965. During the war, which began on April 24, 1965, Caamaño was one of the leaders in the movement to restore the democratically elected President Prof. Juan Bosch, who had been overthrown in a military coup d'état in September 1963.

Caamaño was the son of General Fausto Caamaño Medina; his father was cousin of Juan Pablo Medina de los Santos, the father of both former President Danilo Medina Sánchez and House Speaker Lucía Medina Sánchez.

== Early life ==
Francisco Alberto Caamaño Deñó was born on June 11, 1932, in San Juan de la Maguana. He was the son of General Fausto Caamaño Medina, who died in 1986. His father was a prominent military man during the dictatorship of Rafael Leónidas Trujillo, and he received the highest decorations of the regime, even holding the position of Secretary of State for the Armed Forces (Minister of Defense) from 1952 to 1955.

Caamaño's family is originally from San Juan de la Maguana, his military family tree includes other military personalities such as Pedro Plutarco Caamaño Medina (1889-1893) his uncle, and others such as Jorge Casimiro Fernández Medina, who was a prominent lieutenant colonel in the Dominican Army. Thanks to the influence of his accentuated military kinship, Francisco Alberto excelled in an efficient and careful vocation of service to the military institutions of his country, entering the Dominican Navy at a young age, where he graduated as Ensign and advanced rapidly in the military ladder. During the last years of the Trujillo Era, Caamaño commanded the White Helmeted Corps of the National Police.

Caamaño married María Paula Acevedo Guzmán, known as Chiquita, in 1958. The couple had three children - Alberto Alexander, Francis Alexander and Paola Alexandra (born 1967).

== War of 1965 ==
During the civil war that began on April 24, 1965, he was one of the leaders in the movement to restore the democratically elected President Dr. Juan Bosch, who had been overthrown in a military coup d'état in September, 1963. This faction of loyalists came to be known as the Constitucionalistas, for their desire to return to a rightful and constitutional form of government, as opposed to the military junta that was in place.

As the Constitucionalistas successfully seized and held Santo Domingo over the initial days of the uprising, U.S. President Lyndon Johnson ordered an invasion by the U.S. military, dubbed as Operation Power Pack, stating that the lives of American citizens there needed to be protected. A factor that was arguably more involved in the decision was the fear that the Constitucionalistas were an undemocratic movement that would bring about a communist regime in the country, and this risk of "another Cuba" was something that would not be allowed.

== Presidency ==
During this period, Caamaño was de facto and, arguably, de jure, President of the Dominican Republic. After a few months of fighting by the Constitucionalistas, who were outnumbered and outgunned by the combined forces, Caamaño and his men consented to a reconciliation agreement and thus ended the Constitucionalista government.

Facing ongoing threats and attacks during the following months, including a particularly violent attack at the Hotel Matum in Santiago de los Caballeros, Caamaño accepted an agreement brokered by the United States government. Both constitucionalista President Caamaño and his rival, loyalist President Antonio Imbert Barrera, resigned from office on August 30, 1965. They were succeeded by one provisional president, Héctor García-Godoy.

The Dominican Provisional President, Héctor García-Godoy, sent Colonel Caamaño as the Military Attache to the Dominican Embassy in the United Kingdom. While there, he was contacted by Cuban officials and he fled to Cuba to start a guerrilla group. He had a support group led by Amaury German Aristy that was expected to create the conditions for a victorious landing of Caamaño's commands in the Dominican Republic.

== Death ==
During early 1973, after several years staying low-profile, Caamaño led the landing of a small group of rebels at Playa Caracoles, near Azua and then into the mountains of the Cordillera Central, with the purpose of starting a peasant revolution to overthrow Dominican President Joaquín Balaguer. Balaguer's government was repressive and highly centralized during this period, reminding many of the Rafael Trujillo regime in which Balaguer had been one of the dictator's puppet presidents and close advisers. After a few weeks of guerrilla war against Balaguer's regular army and not having received much interest from the peasants, this group was outmaneuvered by the Dominican Army and wiped out during a fight that included heavy artillery and even airplanes. Caamaño was wounded and captured by Dominican government forces, and then summarily executed.

Some twenty years passed before Caamaño was officially honored by the Dominican government as a hero for his attempts to restore rightful government to his country. Today, there is an avenue in Santo Domingo that bears the name Presidente Caamaño (the avenue borders the western bank of the Ozama River harbor, near its outlet to the Caribbean sea). There is also a metro station in Santo Domingo named after him.

== See also ==
- History of the Dominican Republic
- Dominican Civil War
