= Mateo Morrison =

Dominican writer, lawyer, poet and essayist

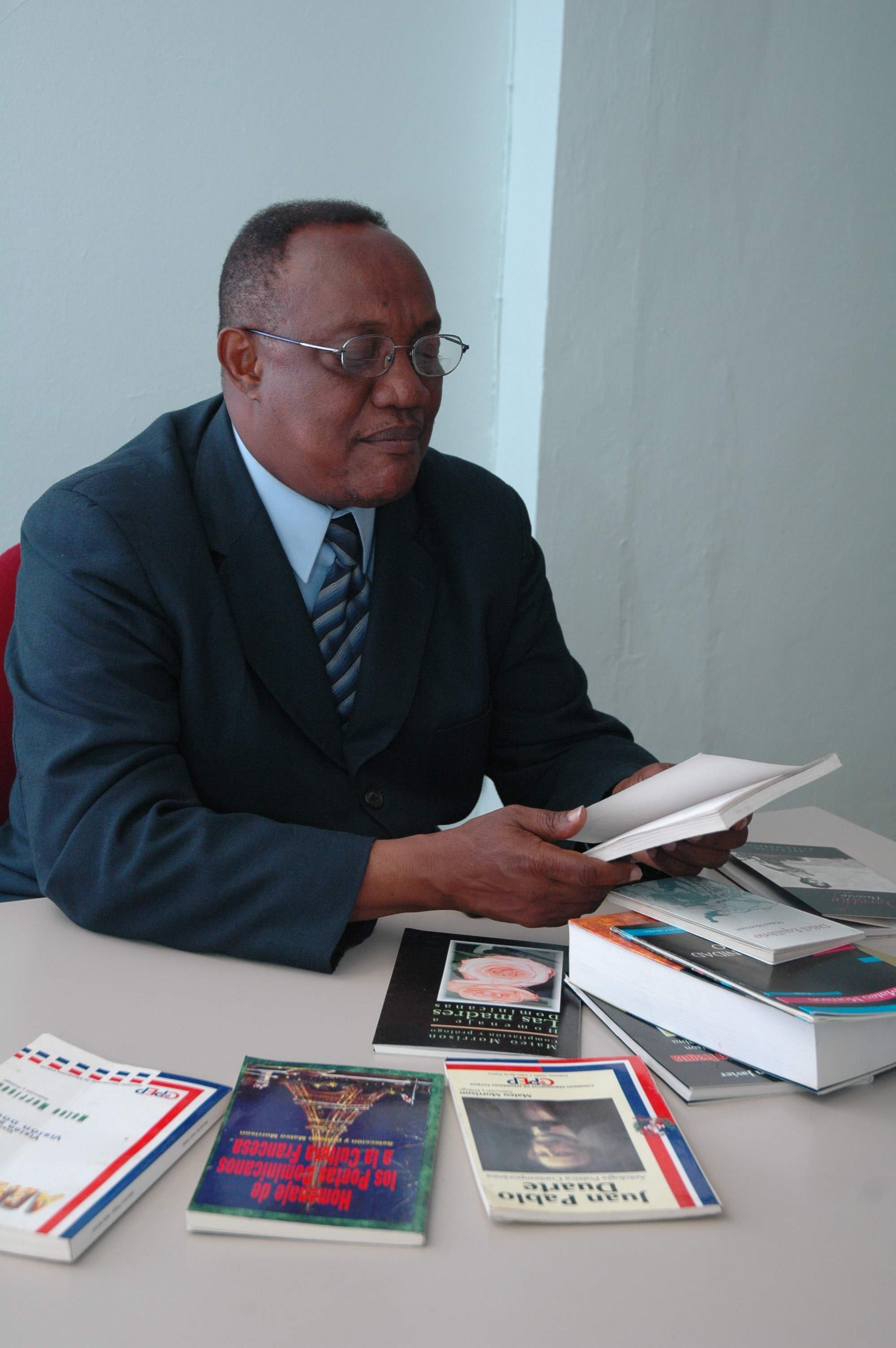
- Mateo Morrison in 2012
- Born: April 14, 1946 (age 80); Santo Domingo, Dominican Republic
- Occupations: Poet, novelist
- Children: Milton Morrison
- Writing career
- Language: Spanish
- Genres: Drama, Romantic

Mateo Morrison Fortunato (born 14 April 1946) is a Dominican writer, lawyer, poet and essayist. He won the Premio Nacional de Literatura of the Dominican Republic in 2010.

== Biography ==
Morrison is the son of Egbert Morrison, a native of Jamaica, and Efigenia Fortunato. He studied at the Latin American and Caribbean Center for Cultural Development in Venezuela, majoring in Cultural Management. He started the Cesar Vallejo Literary Workshop in the latter part of the 1970s and, in 2010, became the twentieth recipient of the Premio Nacional de Literatura, being honored especially for his poetry. He was director of the Department of Culture of the Universidad Autónoma de Santo Domingo (UASD) and has served as the Sub-Secretary of Culture for the Dominican Republic since his appointment in 2008 by Leonel Fernández.

== Selected works ==
- Abril del ’65 : Visión Poética, Comisión Permanente de Efemérides Patrias (2000) ISBN 99934-410-2-3
- Pablo Neruda y Su Presencia, Camara Dominicano del Libro (2004) ISBN 978-99934-422-1-9
- Un Silencio que Camina : Novela, Editora Búho (2007) ISBN 978-9945-161-77-9
- Estático en la Memoria y Otros Textos, Santuario (2009) ISBN 978-9945-00-232-4
- Política Cultural, Legislación y Derechos Culturales en República Dominicana, Ediciones de la Secretaría de Estado de Cultura (2009) ISBN 978-9945-001-42-6
- El Abrazo de las Sombras, Santuario (2011) ISBN 978-9945-00-487-8
