= Abel Martínez (politician) =

Politician in the Dominican Republic (born 1972)

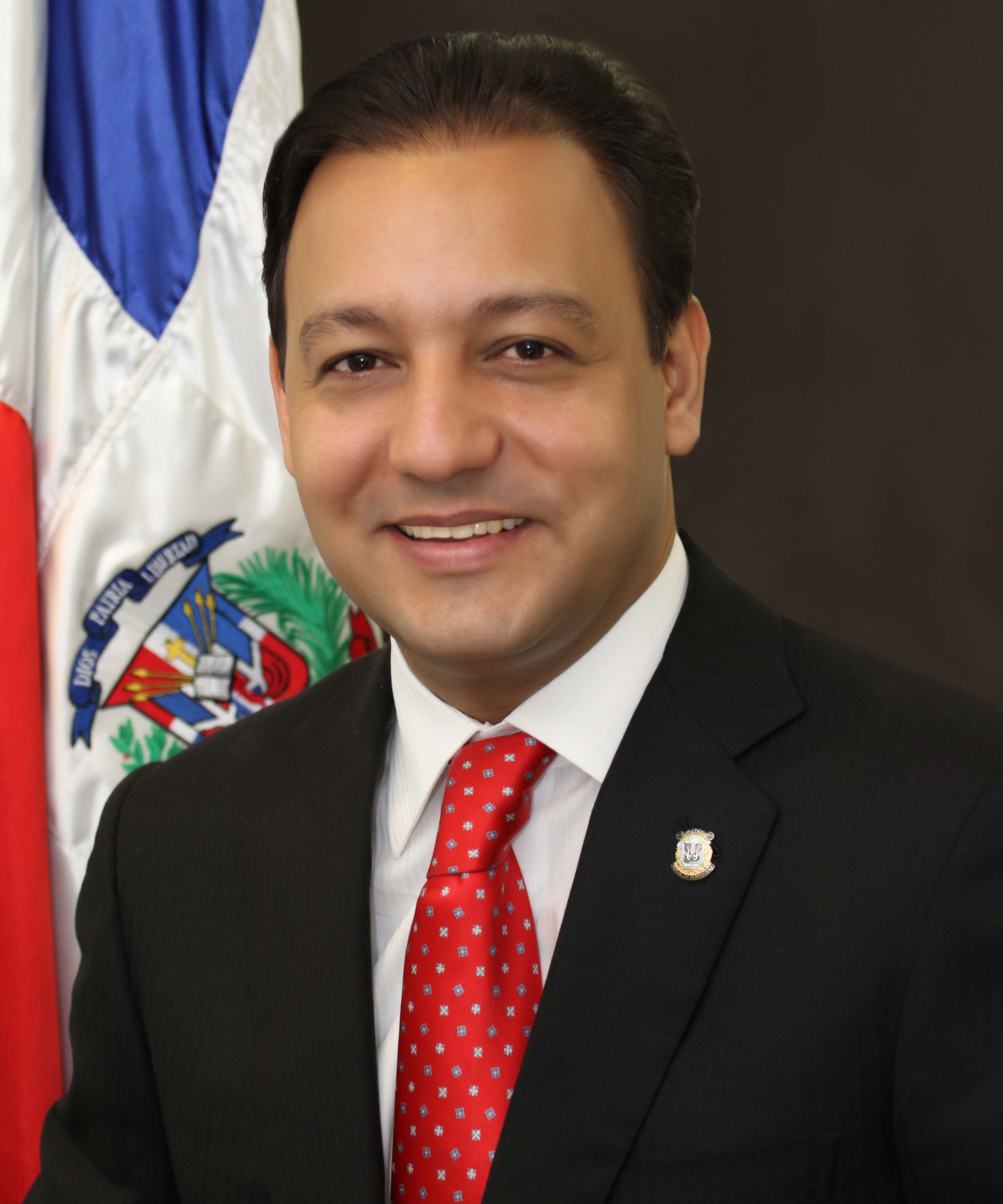
- Martínez in 2010

Mayor of Santiago de los Caballeros
- In office 16 August 2016 – 24 April 2024
- Preceded by: Gilberto Serulle
- Succeeded by: Ulises Rodríguez

President of the Chamber of Deputies of the Dominican Republic
- In office 16 August 2010 – 16 August 2016
- Preceded by: Julio César Valentín
- Succeeded by: Lucía Medina

Personal details
- Born: Abel Atahualpa Martínez Durán; 21 April 1972 (age 53) Santiago de los Caballeros, Dominican Republic
- Political party: Dominican Liberation Party
- Spouse: Nahiony Reyes (m. 2014)
- Children: 2
- Parent(s): Ramón Martínez (Father); Mélida Durán (Mother)
- Website: https://abelmartinez.com.do/

Abel Atahualpa Martínez Durán (born 21 April 1972) is a Dominican politician, educator, and lawyer. He is a member of the Dominican Liberation Party (PLD). In October 2023, he won his party's nomination for the 2024 Dominican presidential election and chose Zoraíma Cuello as his running mate. He then lost the general election to incumbent president Luis Abinader, and former president Leonel Fernández.

== Early life ==
Martínez is the youngest of 15 children born to parents Ramón Martínez and Mélida Durán. He attended primary school in Monción.

== 2024 election ==
On 23 October 2023, Martínez was chosen to be the PLD nominee for the upcoming election. He made an alliance with the National Progressive Bloc and chose Zoraíma Cuello as his running mate.

On election day, Abel and his running mate won 453,468 votes and only 10.39% of the vote, putting him in third place.
