= Roberto Salcedo Sr. =

Dominican Republic actor and politician (born 1953)

Roberto Salcedo

Mayor of the National District (Santo Domingo)
- In office 16 August 2002 – 16 August 2016
- Lieutenant: Margarita Álvarez de Peynado
- Preceded by: Johnny Ventura
- Succeeded by: David Collado

Personal details
- Born: Emeterio Antonio Salcedo Gavilán; 18 April 1953 (age 73) Villa Juana, District of Santo Domingo (now National District)
- Party: Dominican Liberation Party
- Spouse: Angélica Sanz
- Children: Roberto; Luis Ernesto Salcedo; Paloma; Rocío; Carlos; Rodolfo Fernandez
- Occupation: Politician; actor; television producer
- Net worth: (2006) RD$ 114.7 million; (US$ 3.5 million)

Roberto Salcedo Gavilán (born Emeterio Antonio Salcedo Gavilán on 18 April 1953) is a Dominican politician, actor and television producer. Salcedo was mayor of Santo Domingo, D. N. from 2002 to 2016.

== Biography ==
Salcedo was born into a poor family. His father was a marine who earned RD$ 14 (US$ 14) per month, and his mother was a needlewoman.

During the 2016 elections, he lost to David Collado, candidate of the Partido Revolucionario Moderno (Modern Revolutionary Party), who received 57.28% of the votes.

Government offices
| Preceded by Johnny Ventura | Mayor of Santo Domingo, Distrito Nacional; 2002–2016 | Succeeded by David Collado |
