= Lucía Medina =

Lucía Medina Sánchez
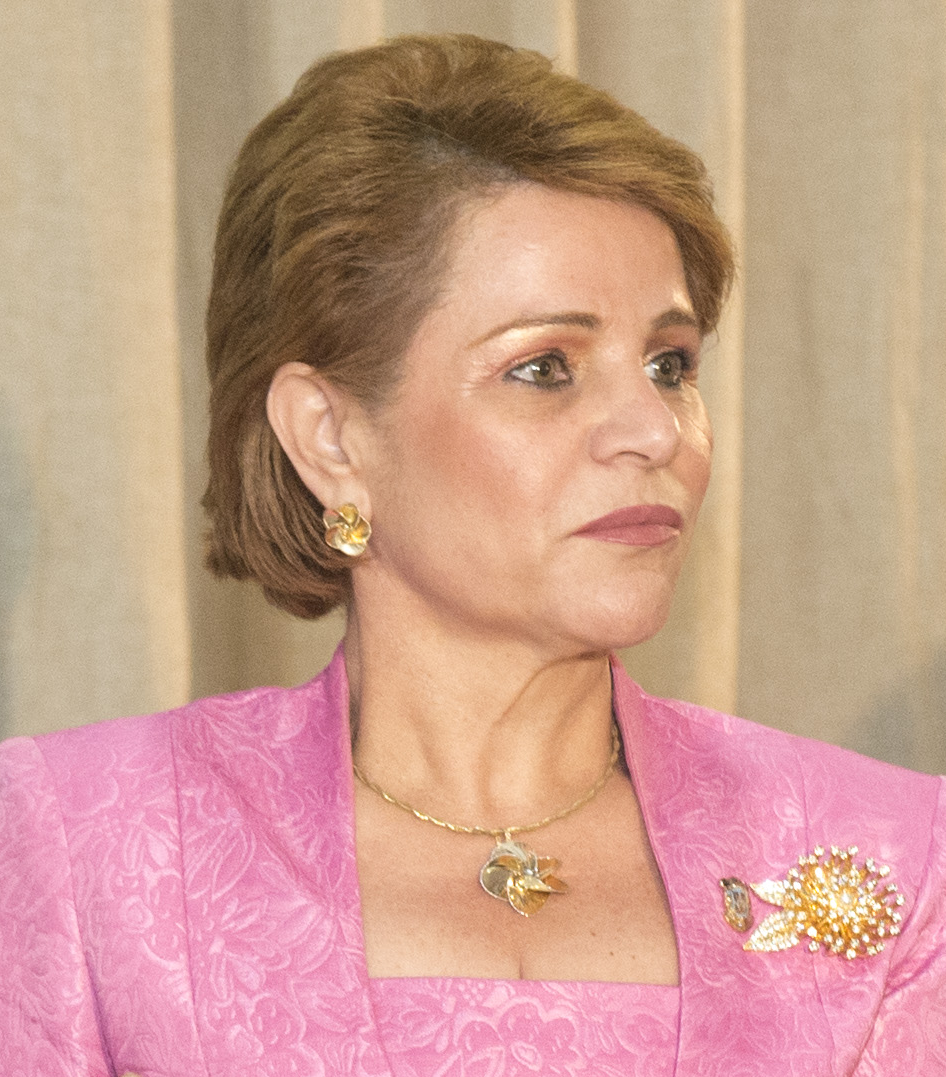

President of the Chamber of Deputies of the Dominican Republic
- In office 16 August 2016 – 16 August 2017
- Vice President: Lupe Núñez
- Preceded by: Abel Martínez
- Succeeded by: Rubén Maldonado

Vice President of the Chamber of Deputies of the Dominican Republic
- In office 16 August 2006 – 16 August 2016
- Preceded by: Hugo R. Núñez Almonte
- Succeeded by: Lupe Núñez

Deputy for the province of San Juan de la Maguana
- In office 16 August 2002 – 16 August 2020

Personal details
- Born: 28 August 1969 (age 57) Arroyo Cano, Dominican Republic
- Party: Dominican Liberation Party
- Spouse: Edgar Mejía
- Relations: Danilo Medina (brother); Francisco Caamaño (second-cousin)
- Children: 2
- Parents: Juan Pablo Medina (father); Amelia Sánchez (mother)
- Education: O&M College
- Profession: accountant
- Ethnicity: White Dominican
- Net worth: RD$ 10.6 million (2010) (US$ 287,000)

Lucía Medina Sánchez (born 28 August 1969) is an accountant and politician from the Dominican Republic. She was the President of the Chamber of Deputies of the Dominican Republic, and is serving as deputy for the province of San Juan de la Maguana since 2002.

She has been elected deputy for the 2002–2006, 2006–2010, 2010–2016, and 2016–2020 legislative periods; she served as Vice President of the Chamber of Deputies for a decade, from 16 August 2006 to 16 August 2016, and as President of this chamber from 16 August 2016 until 16 August 2017. Lucía Medina is the sister of Danilo Medina, former President of the Dominican Republic.
