= Instituto Tecnológico de Santo Domingo =

Private university in Santo Domingo

Santo Domingo Institute of Technology
- Instituto Tecnológico de Santo Domingo (Spanish)
- Motto: Asume el Reto (Spanish)
- Motto in English: Accept the Challenge
- Type: Private
- Established: October 9, 1972; 54 years ago
- Affiliations: CGU
- Rector: Arturo del Villar Albuquerque
- Location: 18.488126°N 69.962498°W; Santo Domingo, Dominican Republic
- Campus: Urban
- Colors: Red, white and gray
- Website: www.intec.edu.do
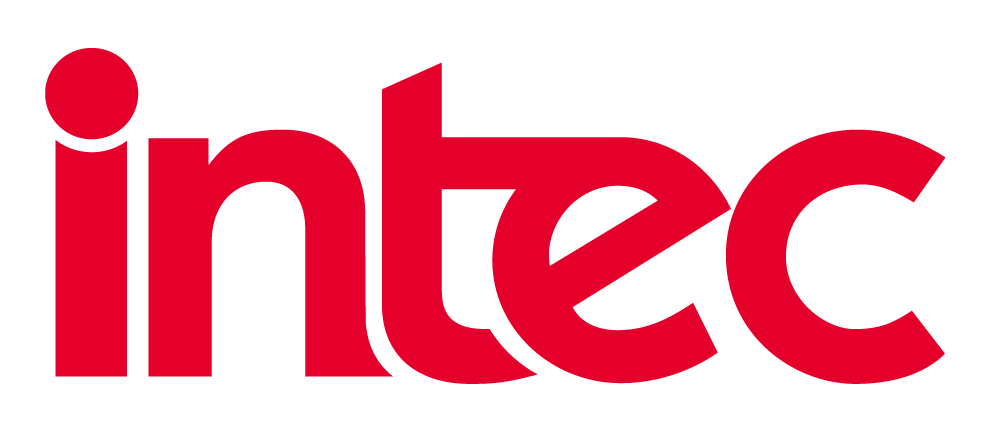

Instituto Tecnológico de Santo Domingo (English: Santo Domingo Institute of Technology), also known as INTEC, is a private university located in Santo Domingo, Dominican Republic. It was founded on October 9, 1972, by a group of connoted professionals and is considered the best institute of technology in the country.

== History ==
The university began with the intention to contribute to the social transformation of the country, the continuous improvement of the quality of life and the preservation of moral and material patrimony. It was incorporated legally as a non-profit organization by means of Presidential Decree no. 2389 on June 15, 1972. Its original academic activities included post-graduate programs, permanent education, and scientific research. In 1973, the university integrated other fields of study into its curriculum. Its current curricular structure is based on the System, offering academic programs in Engineering, Business Administration, Humanities, Social Sciences, and Medicine.

== Accreditation ==
INTEC is the first Dominican university to be accredited by the Dominican Association for Self-Study and Accreditation (Asociación Dominicana para el Autoestudio y la Acreditación, ADAAC). Its school of medicine has been accredited by the Caribbean Accreditation Authority for Education in Medicine and other Health Professions (CAAM-HP), making it the first medical school in the Dominican Republic to be accredited by an organization recognized by the World Federation for Medical Education (WFME).

== Notable alumni ==
- Luis Abinader - Dominican economist, businessman, and politician. President of the Dominican Republic
- Jaime David Fernández Mirabal - former vice-president of the Dominican Republic
- Danilo Medina - former president of the Dominican Republic
- Milton Morrison - 2020 Dominican Republic presidential candidate
