= Jaime David Fernández Mirabal =

Dominican politician (born 1956)

36th Vice President of the Dominican Republic
- In office 16 August 1996 – 16 August 2000
- President: Leonel Fernández
- Preceded by: Jacinto Peynado y Garrigosa
- Succeeded by: Milagros Ortiz Bosch

Minister of Sports of the Dominican Republic
- In office 16 August 2008 – 16 August 2011
- Preceded by: Omar Ramírez
- Succeeded by: Ernesto Reyna

Personal details
- Born: 15 October 1956 (age 70) Salcedo, Salcedo, Dominican Republic
- Relatives: Mirabal sisters (aunts); Minou Tavárez Mirabal (cousin)

Jaime David Fernandez Mirabal (born 15 October 1956) is a Dominican psychiatrist, agronomist, and politician.

He was Vice President of the Dominican Republic, having served in the first Government of the Dominican Liberation Party from 1996 to 2000. He was also the Minister for Environment and Natural Resources of the Dominican Republic.

== Biography ==
=== First stage ===
Jaime David Fernandez Mirabal was born on October 15, 1956, in Ojo de Agua, Salcedo, today called Hermanas Mirabal Province. He is the son of Jaime Fernandez Camilo and Dedé Mirabal Reyes, and the nephew of heroines Patria, Minerva, and María Teresa Mirabal, who were brutally assassinated during the Trujillo dictatorship on November 25, 1960, the date which was declared as the International Day of Non-Violence Against Women. This date is recognized by many countries, especially Onu.

Fernández is the brother of Jaime Enrique Fernandez Mirabal and Jaime Rafael Fernandez Mirabal. His mother, Dede, took responsibility for raising her sisters' 6 children: Nelson Gonzalez Mirabal, Noris Gonzalez Mirabal and Raul Gonzalez Mirabal Mirabal (first son, daughter and second son of Patria); Minerva Tavárez Mirabal and Manolo Tavárez Mirabal (daughter and son of Minerva) and Jacqueline Guzman Mirabal (daughter of Maria Teresa).

Fernandez married Lissy Campos in 1988; they have three children, Adriana Fernandez Campos, Antón David Fernandez Campos and Carmen Adela Fernandez Campos.

=== Studies and interests ===
Fernandez completed his primary and secondary education in Salcedo, later attending the Instituto Superior de Agricultura (English: Higher Institute of Agriculture) (ISA), studying agronomy. After graduating with his bachelor's degree he moved to Santo Domingo, where he studied medicine at the Instituto Tecnologico de Santo Domingo (INTEC). After this, Fernandez moved to Spain where he specialized in mental health at the Complutense University of Madrid. After various travels through Italy, Germany and Greece where he helped treat many patients in these countries, he undertook further study in social medicine.

During his career as a doctor, Fernandez has worked in Cambita Garabitos in San Cristobal, Rancho Español and Las Galeras, Samana in the Clinic Rural Montellano Salcedo Hospital, both located in Salcedo.

Fernandez speaks several languages, including his native Spanish, English, Italian, and French. He also has non-speaking knowledge of German, Portuguese and Greek.

According to some media, Fernandez has always been interested in sports. From the age of 13 he decided to organize athletic competitions in his hometown, Ojo de Agua, Salcedo, in memory of his aunts the Mirabal Sisters. He went on to create a sports and recreation club called the Mirabal Sisters Cultural and Sports Club, which sought to promote the organization and training of youth culture across the province. Fernandez was an active player in several sports, particularly football. At the same time he also showed some artistic skills in science, becoming a member of the drama and poetry of community in his hometown. He has also served as president of the Union Sports Salcedo Province and director of several national sports federations.

Fernandez has also demonstrated his interests in education, becoming a member of the Society of Parents and Friends of the School, and serving as an important part of the Committee on Rural Health Clinic. He has also participated in the training of farmers' associations and mothers' clubs, with a single, clear objective of promoting good moral values, and providing educational and recreational services throughout the country.

=== Start in politics and vice presidency ===
Fernandez admired and followed the doctrine and ideology of Professor Juan Bosch, becoming convinced that to better promote social welfare activities, he had to go into politics. He then decided to join the ranks of the new Dominican Liberation Party (PLD) political party in 1973. Since the party's inception Fernandez devoted himself to further party integration and the search for new supporters for the PLD, proposing the integration of new party members in the Province of Salcedo. He also campaigned on the party's behalf for three years in Madrid, Spain.

In 1990, he was nominated by his fellow party sympathizers for the candidacy of senator of Salcedo province. The campaign was successful and led to him becoming the first PLD senator of Salcedo. In his new position in the Senate, he began extensive work within the concentration of different political forces. During the government of Dr. Joaquín Balaguer, he helped to create a Provincial Development Program, which was recognized both nationally and internationally, especially in the areas of health, education, drinking water, and loans for women-run businesses.

The efforts of Senator Fernandez, along with that of the Provincial Planning Office, the Provincial Office for Women, the Provincial Office of Information and Statistics (OPIE), and the Legal Center for Women, led to the implementation of a program to protect women's rights and fight domestic violence, continuing the legacy of his aunts, the Mirabal Sisters.

In 1994, Fernandez ran again for office, and was reelected to the Senate. In 1996, Professor Juan Bosch declined to run for the presidency. Eventual presidential nominee Dr. Leonel Fernández Reyna suggested that Fernandez consider becoming vice president. Fernandez was immediately nominated by the PLD for Vice President of the Republic. He became the first vice president representing both the PLD and Ojo de Agua, Salcedo.

He was later appointed by President Fernández, during his 3rd presidential term, as Secretary of State for Environment and Natural Resources.

== See also ==
- Dominican Republic
- List of vice presidents of the Dominican Republic
- List of presidents of the Dominican Republic
- Leonel Fernandez Reyna
- Juan Bosch
- Politics of the Dominican Republic
- Dominican Liberation Party

Political offices
Preceded by Jacinto Peynado y Garrigosa	Vice President of the Dominican Republic; 1996–2000	Succeeded by Milagros Ortiz Bosch
Preceded by ?	Senator for Salcedo; 1990–1996	Succeeded by Bautista Rojas Gómez
Preceded by Omar Ramírez	Minister of Environment and Natural Resources; 2008-2011	Succeeded by Ernesto Reyna
Preceded by Felipe Payano	Minister of Sports, Physical Education and Recreation; 2012–2016	Succeeded by Danilo Díaz Vizcaíno
