= David Collado =

Dominican politician and businessman (born 1975)

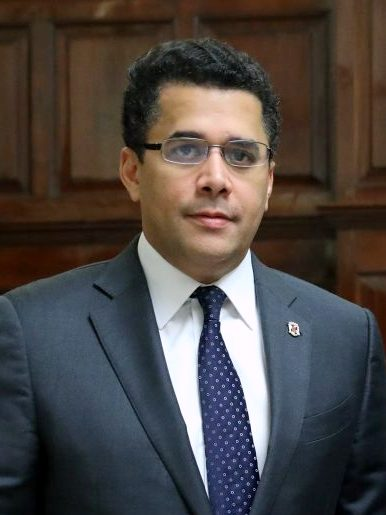

Minister of Tourism of the Dominican Republic
- Assuming office 16 August 2020
- President: Luis Abinader
- Succeeding: Francisco Javier García

Mayor of Santo Domingo
- In office 16 August 2016 – 24 April 2020
- Preceded by: Roberto Salcedo Sr.
- Succeeded by: Carolina Mejía

Personal details
- Born: Miguel David Collado Morales; 29 September 1975 (age 51) Santo Domingo, Dominican Republic
- Party: Modern Revolutionary Party
- Children: Analia Collado
- Parent(s): David Collado and Oneyda Morales
- Education: Bachelor’s degree in Tourism; Bachelor’s degree in Business Administration
- Occupation: Politician, entrepreneur, marketer and communicator

Miguel David Collado Morales (born 29 September 1975) is a Dominican businessman, communicator and politician. He was Deputy for the National District from 2010 to 2016, mayor of the National District from 2016 to 2020, and currently holds the position of Minister of Tourism of the Dominican Republic.

In the 2016 general elections, he ran as candidate for mayor of the National District through an alliance between the Social Christian Reformist Party (PRSC) and the Modern Revolutionary Party (PRM). He won with 56.69% of the votes counted against Roberto Salcedo, as candidate of the Dominican Liberation Party (PLD) and allies, who achieved 37.10%. In 2020, after concluding his term as mayor, he was appointed by President-elect Luis Abinader as Minister of Tourism of the Dominican Republic

== Personal life ==
Miguel David Collado Morales was born on September 29, 1975, in the city of Santo Domingo, Dominican Republic. His parents are David Collado and Oneyda Morales. He attended school at the San Juan Bautista School; he later obtained a bachelor's degree in Business Relations and a bachelor's degree in Business Administration from Atlantic University.

== Corporate career ==
He was founder and partner of the company Tedeco/Móvil Time. He ventured into the film industry with the production company Entrepreneur Films, serving as executive producer of the Dominican films El Rey de Najayo, Ponchao and Pueto Pa Mí He was president of Medios Emprendedores, a communications company that publishes the magazine Emprendedores and the television program of the same name. He contributed to the formation of entrepreneurs with international figures such as Rudy Giuliani, Alan Greenspan, George W. Bush and John C. Maxwell, whom he invited to the Dominican Republic to give lectures to students and young entrepreneurs.

== Political career ==
=== Congressman ===
In 2010, he was elected as Deputy for the Dominican Revolutionary Party (PRD) for District No. 1 of the National District. During his legislative term, he presented projects in favor of youth and the national economy, incentives for tourism, sports and culture, and laws to benefit women and the most needy sectors of the Dominican Republic.

David Collado was president of the Permanent Commission of Tourism of the Chamber of Deputies from 2010 to 2016, and precursor of multiple bills to declare more than 16 provinces of the country as Ecotourism Provinces. Collado was also one of the precursors of the revision and approval of Law 195-13, which modifies several articles of Law 158-01 on incentive for the Promotion of Tourism in the Country.

Law 88-13 which declares November 12 as the National Day of the Dominican Entrepreneur, enacted on July 11, 2013, is an initiative of David Collado.

=== Mayor of the National District (2016–2020) ===
Collado was elected Mayor of the National District in 2016. During his tenure, he focused on urban revitalization, waste management reform, public space recovery, and municipal transparency. His administration emphasized efficiency, public-private collaboration, and modernization of local government services.

=== Minister of Tourism (2020–present) ===
In August 2020, Collado was appointed Minister of Tourism of the Dominican Republic.

=== See also ===
- Luis Abinader
- Carolina Mejía de Garrigó
- Leonel Fernández
- Danilo Medina
- Margarita Cedeño de Fernández
- Luis Almagro
- Adriano Espaillat
- Geovanny Vicente
- Tom Pérez
- Faride Raful
- José Ignacio Paliza
