= Raquel Arbaje =

First Lady of the Dominican Republic, businesswoman and writer (born 1970)

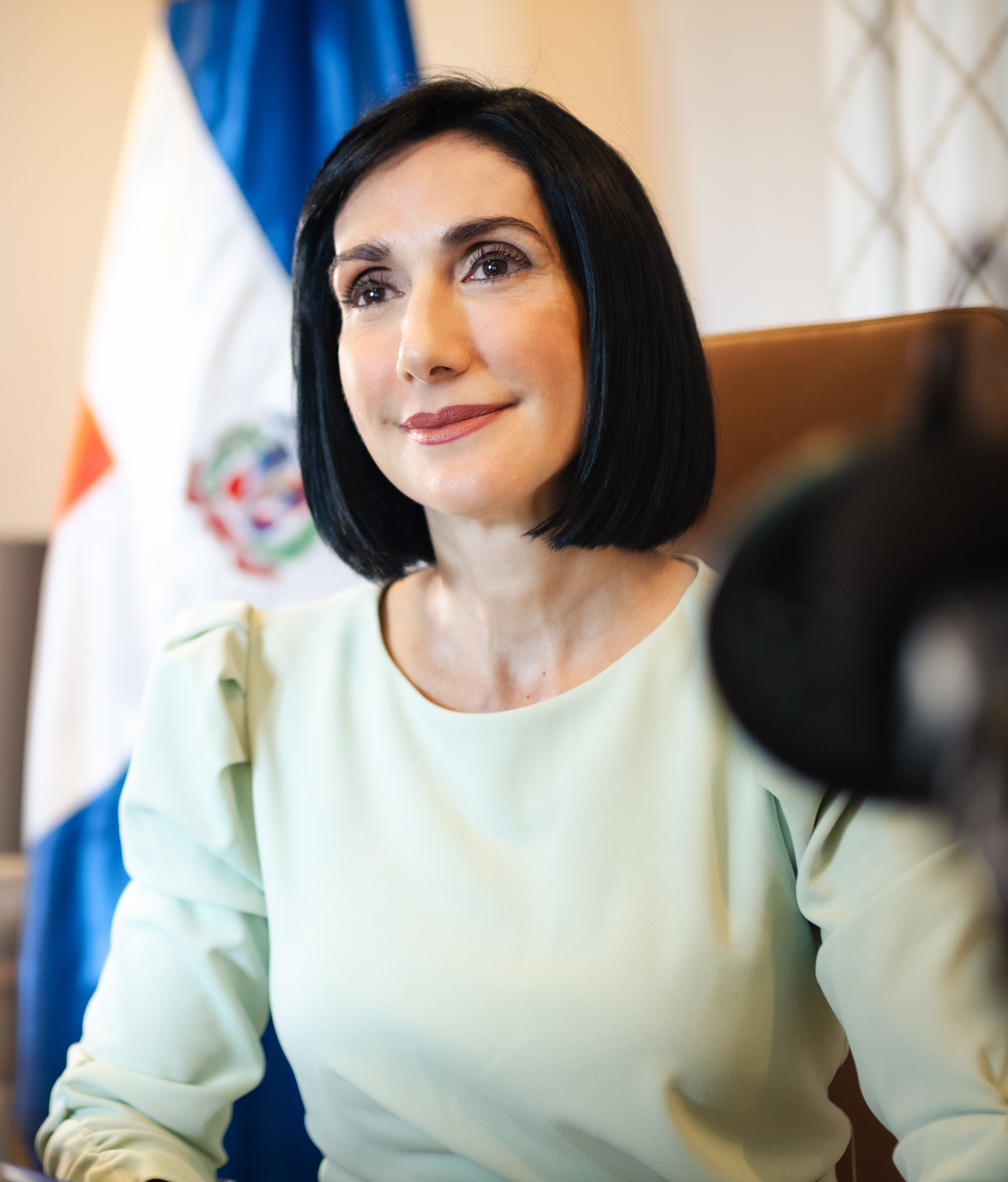
- Arbaje in 2021

55th First Lady of the Dominican Republic
- Current
- Assumed role 16 August 2020
- President: Luis Abinader
- Preceded by: Cándida Montilla

Personal details
- Born: Raquel Patricia Arbaje Soneh; 21 September 1970 (age 56) Santo Domingo, Dominican Republic
- Party: Modern Revolutionary Party (2014–present)
- Other political affiliations: Dominican Revolutionary Party (1988–2014)
- Spouse: Luis Abinader (m. 1995)
- Children: Esther Patricia; Graciela Lucía; Adriana Margarita
- Parents: Elías Arbaje Farah (father); Margarita Soneh Curi (mother)
- Relatives: Bartolo Soni (uncle); Ricardo Arbaje Soneh (brother); Eduardo Arbaje Soneh (brother); Mónica Inés Arbaje Soneh (sister)
- Education: Universidad Iberoamericana (Lic.)
- Occupation: Businesswoman; writer
- Website: raquelarbaje.com.do (in Spanish)

Raquel Patricia Arbaje Soneh de Abinader (born 21 September 1970) is a Dominican businesswoman and children's literature writer. She has served as the First Lady of the Dominican Republic, since August 2020 as the wife of President Luis Abinader.

== Early life ==
Arbaje is the daughter of businessman Elías Arbaje Farah and Margarita Soneh Curi, who were both of Lebanese descent. Her uncle Bartolo Soni, older brother of Margarita, was a professional boxer. She is the third of four siblings. Her father was a businessman who manufactured mattresses.

== Education ==
Arbaje graduated summa cum laude with business administration degree from the Universidad Iberoamericana (UNIBE) in Santo Domingo. She speaks fluent Spanish, English, and French, and has some knowledge of Italian and Portuguese.

Arbaje is a businesswoman and author of children's literature. She also recorded a song, "'Mi cajita de valores", with the proceeds benefiting the Don Bosco children's nonprofit.

== Personal life ==
She married economist Luis Abinader. Together, the couple have three children – Esther Patricia, Graciela Lucía, and Adriana Margarita Abinader Arbaje. Together with Abinader, Arbaje composed the anthem for the Modern Revolutionary Party, which was co-founded by her husband in 2014.

In June 2020, both Arbaje and Abinader tested positive for COVID-19 during the 2020 presidential election campaign. Both recovered from the coronavirus.

== First Lady ==
Raquel Arbaje became First Lady of the Dominican Republic on 16 August 2020. Unlike her immediate predecessors, Abinader and Arbaje announced that the government would eliminate funding for the Office of the First Lady during his presidential tenure. Instead, Arbaje had proposed a much smaller office to handle the schedule and role of the first lady during the 2016 and 2020 campaigns.

Honorary titles
Preceded by Cándida Montilla de Medina	First Lady of the Dominican Republic; 2020–present	Incumbent
