= Milton Morrison =

Dominican electrical engineer, writer, businessperson and politician

Personal details
- Born: Milton Teófilo Morrison Ramírez; August 14, 1975 (age 50) Santo Domingo, Dominican Republic
- Party: País Posible (2017–present)
- Parents: Mateo Morrison; Cristobalina Ramirez
- Education: Santo Domingo Institute of Technology
- Occupation: electrical engineer; writer; businesspersonel; politician
- Website: Official website; Personal Twitter

Milton Teófilo Morrison Ramírez(born August 14, 1975) is a Dominican electrical engineer, writer, businessperson, Dominican politician and a 2020 Dominican Republic presidential candidate.

Milton was born and raised in Santo Domingo, Dominican Republic to Mateo Morrison, an award-winning poet, and Cristobalina Ramírez, a librarian. He earned his Bachelor of Science degree in electrical engineering from the Santo Domingo Institute of Technology, and his MS from the University of Bradford. In 2017, he founded a political party in the Dominican Republic named País Posible, which has over 128.000 active members as of 2019.

== Biography ==
=== Early life and education ===
Milton Teófilo Morrison Ramirez was born on August 14, 1975. His father is Mateo Morrison, an award-winning poet, whose parents were English-Jamaican migrants. His mother is Cristobalina Ramírez, a Dominican-American librarian. Morrison grew up in an empoverished area of the Dominican Republic, Los Tres Brazos where Milton then completed his secondary education at the Escuela Nueva y Mahatma Gandhi in the area. In 1992, at only 19 years old, he earned his Bachelor of Science degree in electrical engineering, where he graduated with cum laude honors. In 1999, he migrated to England to pursue his Master of Science degree in Development and Project Planning at the University of Bradford. In 2002, he obtained a postbaccalaureate degree in International Business from the University of Florida.

=== Career ===
Morrison started his professional career in 1998, that same year he founded with his brother Nelson Morrison the engineering company Morrison Ingenieros. In 2000, Morrison joined the United Nations' program Millennium Development Goals. That same year, he is named the director of renewable energies at the Ministerio de Industria y Comercio in the Dominican Republic. In 2001, he started his career as a professor at his alma mater, Santo Domingo Institute of Technology teaching electrical engineering. In 2002, he joined the Fifth Episcopal Conference of Latin America representing the Dominican Republic in New Delhi, India. In 2006, he was named Executive VP at the Asociación Dominicana de la Industria Eléctrica (ADIE), where he served until 2017.
