= Milton Morris (American politician) =

American politician in Louisiana

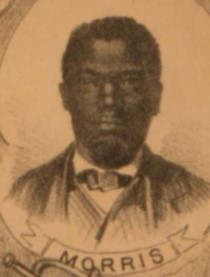

Louisiana House of Representatives
- In office 1868–1872

Personal details
- Born: Missouri
- Party: Republican
- Occupation: politician

Milton Morris was an American politician. He served two terms in the Louisiana House of Representatives during the Reconstruction era from 1868 until 1872 representing Ascension Parish. He was a former slave.

Morris was originally from Missouri and lived there before the American Civil War. He married and had three children. After his wife died he married again and had another child.

Morris was re-elected to the Louisiana House. He was among the men appointed by the Louisiana Senate to leadership of the Morning Star Benevolent Association, an agency established to manage burials in Ascension. He and J. E. Warren were also authorized to operate a ferry service across the river to and from Donaldsonville.

== See also ==
- List of African-American officeholders during Reconstruction
