= Milagros Ortiz Bosch =

Vice President of the Dominican Republic from 2000 to 2004

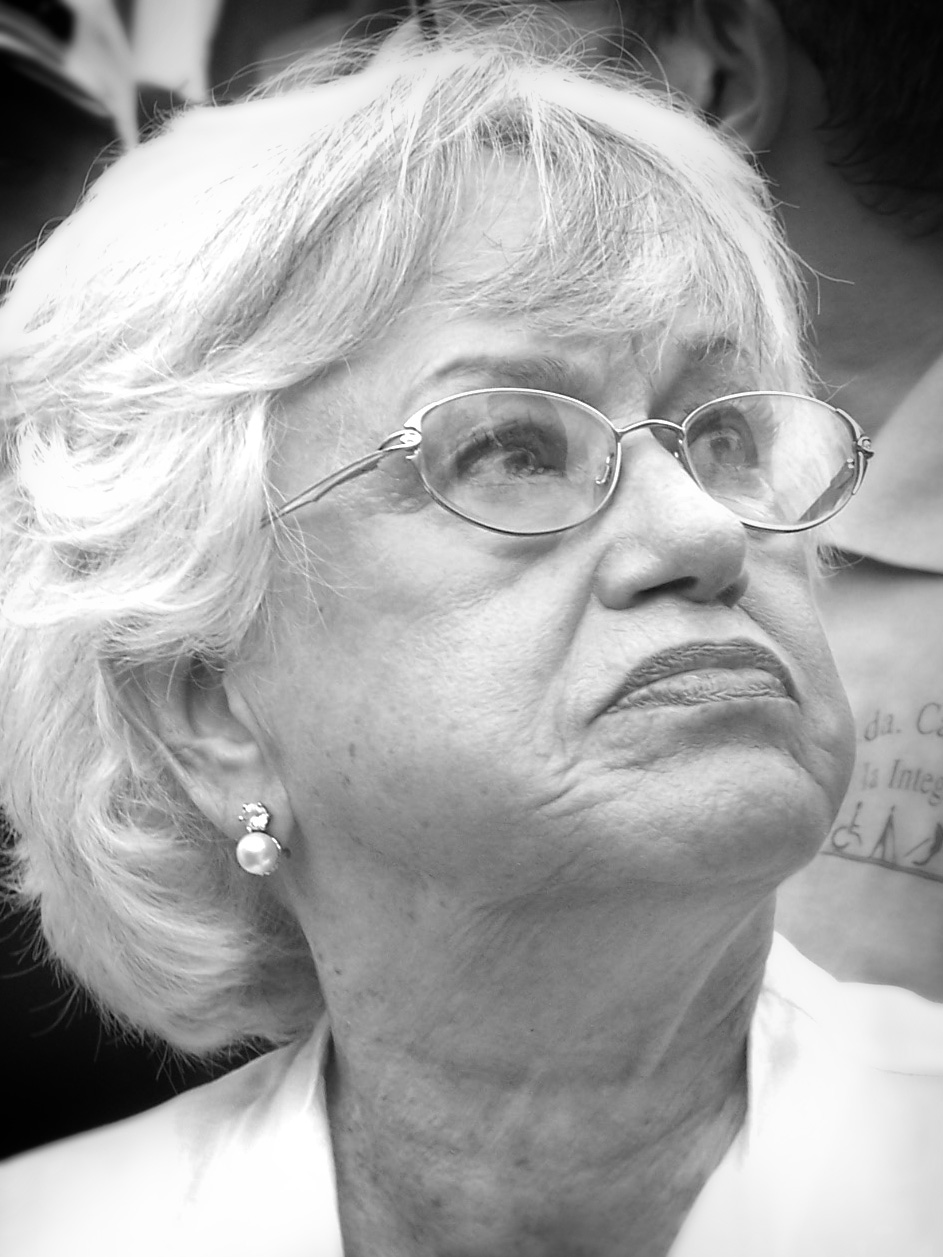
- Ortiz Bosch in 2007

37th Vice President of the Dominican Republic
- In office 16 August 2000 – 16 August 2004
- President: Hipólito Mejía
- Preceded by: Jaime David Fernández Mirabal
- Succeeded by: Rafael Alburquerque

Minister of Education of the Dominican Republic
- In office 16 August 2000 – 16 August 2004
- Preceded by: Ligia Amada Melo
- Succeeded by: Alejandrina German

Senator of the Dominican Republic
- In office 16 August 1994 – 16 August 2000
- President: Leonel Fernández; Joaquin Balaguer
- Succeeded by: José Tomás Pérez

Personal details
- Born: Milagros Maria Ortiz Bosch; 26 August 1936 (age 90) Santo Domingo, Dominican Republic
- Party: Modern Revolutionary Party
- Other political affiliations: Dominican Revolutionary Party (before 2014)
- Spouse: Joaquín Basanta
- Children: Juan Basanta

Maria Milagros Ortiz Bosch (born 26 August 1936) is a lawyer, business manager and Dominican politician. She was the first Dominican woman to be vice president of the country, during 2000–2004. She was senator of the Distrito Nacional twice (1994–1998 and 1998–2000) and Secretary of State (Minister) for Education of the Dominican Republic, for the same time period she was vice president (2000-2004).

She was again a candidate for senator from the National District of the Dominican Revolutionary Party (PRD) in the congressional and municipal elections of 2010, being defeated by the candidate of the Dominican Liberation Party Reinaldo Pared Pérez.

In the Dominican Republic general election in 2016 she served as campaign manager for the mayoral candidate of the National District, who would be the winner, David Collado.

== Early life and career ==
María Milagros Ortiz Bosch was born in Santo Domingo on 26 August 1936 to Virgilio Ortiz Peña (1896-1985) and Ángela Bosch Gaviño.

=== Ancestry ===
Ancestors of Milagros Ortiz Bosch

8. (Dominican Republic) Faustino Ortiz Tejeda (Baní, 1822–1887)
4. (Dominican Republic) Faustino del Pilar Ortiz Pimentel (Villa Sombrero, 1863–1957)
9. (Dominican Republic) María Nicolasa Pimentel Guerrero (Boca Canasta, 1826–1921)
2. (Dominican Republic) Virgilio Ortiz Peña (Villa Sombrero, 1896–1985)
10. (Dominican Republic) Juan Peña Guerrero (Baní, 1840–?)
5. (Dominican Republic) Brígida Peña Báez (Baní)
11. (Dominican Republic) Manuela Báez Tejeda (Baní, 1841–1942)
1. (Dominican Republic) Milagros María Ortiz Bosch (Santo Domingo, 1936)
12. (Spain) Francisco Bosch Ximeno (Tortosa, 1837)
6. (Spain) José Bosch Subirat (Tortosa, 1877–Santo Domingo, 1963)
13. (Spain) María de la Paz de Teresa y Miranda (Tortosa, 1840)
3. (Haiti) Ángela Bosch y Gaviño (Cap-Haïtien, 1911–Santo Domingo, 1984)
14. (Spain) Juan Gaviño Rodríguez (A Guarda, 1852)
7. (Puerto Rico) Ángela Gaviño Costales (Juana Díaz, 1886–Santo Domingo, 1963)
15. (Puerto Rico) Petronila Costales Cintrón (Juana Díaz, 1868)

=== A life out of the ordinary ===
When she was a young girl she would hear the name of her uncle Juan Bosch (uncle Juan) mentioned discreetly by many of her relatives. Over time her uncle continued to gain admiration and reverence from her relatives, while attracting enmity from Rafael Trujillo and his regime.

Ortiz's family lived under constant harassment from the dictatorship. Caliés (snitches) would stroll outside the family home with complete confidence, while local vendors and door-to-door trades people were suspected of being informants for the intelligence services of the regime. Her uncle Pepito was called all the time for questioning by the SIM (Military Intelligence Service) and there were many occasions when he was jailed for being an enemy of the government and brother of Uncle Juan.

In Santa Teresita School, where she studied, Milagros was fortunate that most teachers were opposed to the Trujillo regime. Among them were teachers Maricusa Ornes, Natalia Carmen Domínguez, Ligia Echavarría and Pontius Sabater. Santa Teresita was a secular school and was heavily influenced by the humanist school of Eugenio María de Hostos and, by way of consequence, almost all teachers were known by reference or friends of Juan Bosch.

The regime era was a difficult period for the family. Some neighbors were persecuted for befriending Ortiz Bosch. The maternal grandparents of Milagros went into exile after seeking diplomatic protection through their foreign citizenship. Doña Angelita Milagros's mother and sister of Uncle Juan was persecuted, as were her husband and the rest of the family.

On one occasion, and as a young teenager, Milagros was called by the mother of a friend whose 15 year birthday celebration was soon to take place. The mother told Ortiz that she could not go to the party because Trujillo's daughter Angelita Trujillo had confirmed her attendance to the same event. She resigned herself as Ortiz was already used to that kind of behaviour by friends, defenders and people wary of the Trujillo regime. Many people simply wanted to be careful not to fall out of favor with "The Boss" as Trujillo would often be called by his supporters. Even as a child Ortiz's parents and grandparents had warned her that the entire family was classified as not supportive of the regime, so discrimination of this kind was common against Ortiz and her cousins. One particular target was the son of the uncle Juan, Leon Bosch himself, who at the time was also a young man and he had grown up with his grandparents.

=== The dictatorship falls ===
On 30 May 1961 surprised Milagros and the whole family in frank conspiracy. Dominican Youth did not take it anymore and university groups rebelled. Doña Angelita, her mother, still recovering from a stroke suffered a year before learning of the death of the Mirabal Sisters, with whom the Bosch family had narrowed friendship. Doña Angelita not withstand the torment that caused an officer recognized the SIM, César Villeta, threw all sorts of insults against young sisters killed hours earlier by agents of tyranny. Villeta lived outside his home.

=== The first meeting ===
Milagros arrived that morning in early 1962 charged with emotion to San Isidro de Coronado in Costa Rica, to participate in a political training course with more than 70 Dominicans and three Ecuadorians among the latter Rodrigo Borja, then president of Ecuador. She had fallen behind because a companion, Asela Morel, had faced difficulty with their travel papers. The excitement of Milagros was greater than all others: I was going to finally meet Uncle Juan, a professor of that course, and who organized and its return to the motherland as leader of the PRD.

When he reached the classroom, Milagros was surprised by the personality of the man. He was 52 years old, completely white hair, handsome, say women type. He was at the head table, next to Jimmy Duran, Washington Peña, Eduardo Tavarez, Antonio Canto, José Andrés Aybar Sánchez, Arnaldo Sención and ... who could not miss, José Francisco Peña Gómez.

The reunion with his uncle, Juan, took place as planned. The daughter of his sister, Angelita, had reached adulthood. She is described as getting an education and sharing his political views.

Along with Pena Gomez and Rodrigo Borja, Milagros was the selected course, for the pride of his uncle and leader.

=== The separation ===
Since that meeting in Costa Rica, Milagros would become one of the most important in the political life of Juan Bosch, his personal assistant figures, and was at his side in all circumstances of life. The output of Don Juan of the PRD found Milagros in New York, where he walked with his son John on his shoulder, busily seeking healing of his illness. She returned to the country at the call of the leader and immediately joined the work of formation of the new party, the PLD. Don Juan give her the charge of the education department and then entrusted with the task of organization.

They spent the first five years, in a long process that caused many misunderstandings and some of the rising desertions of the PLD. Milagros stood beside the leader, but at some point began to realize that was losing its own political and professional identity, her life revolved around no longer the leader, but uncle. They began to weigh more family ties to politicians and supporters.

Without even realizing what was happening inside, Milagros suddenly realized that I needed space for his own life. That was evident from the election results of 1978. Milagros was not in accordance with the proposed formula Bosch the country the same May 17 of that year at the outbreak of the crisis by the attempt of the military chiefs of ignoring the results of elections or a government of national unity was formed.

The months would determine, thereafter, leaving the PLD and its political aloofness, and forever, Uncle Juan. The process was difficult and painful. Milagros gathered the closest relatives and informed them about their irreversible decision. Many months later Milagros own career began in her old party and he walked.

== Senator of the National District ==
She was senator of the Republic and in such a condition was part of the first National Council of the Magistracy that gave form and life to the current Supreme Court at the same time has made the rest of the judiciary.

But its legislative history does not stop there. Since its senatorial seat Milagros promoted important initiatives to institutionalize the Republic, as the Judicial Reform Act, the Education Reform Act, Women Protection Act and so many others.

== Vice President and Minister of Education ==
She was vice president of the Republic for four years, chosen by most of their fellow citizens, and simultaneously held the Ministry of Education, leaving their mark on a management that is conspicuous by its transparency.

During the four years (2000–2004) when he was Vice President of the Republic, occupied the Ministry of Education, president of the National Council on Disability, and on 37 occasions the temporary presidency of the Republic before the exits and travel President. As Secretary of State of Education corresponded to him to sign loan agreements with the Inter-American Development Bank (IDB) to establish the Multi-phase Programs for Basic Education and Media. Ortiz Bosch created and led the Strategic Development Plan of Education for the period 2003–2012, and put into operation the Decentralized Meetings of Education so that they will take care of maintenance of schools. Under his management the first national census was conducted school infrastructure.

Among its major contributions include the establishment of TRANSPARENCY software, which allowed the Dominicans and foreigners know through internet all actions of the Ministry of Education (MINERD) in financial matters, including public payroll, purchases, procurement, among others.

At different times when she held the interim presidency, she had to make decisions of significance as it was the ouster of then director of National Property, Victor Tió, accused of corruption, the imprisonment of the Dominican consul in Cap-Haïtien, mediate the Agrarian Institute Dominican before the temporary abduction of one of its executives, among other measures.

After occupying the Vice Presidency of the Republic in the period 2000–2004, she was initially opposed the reelection purposes of Hipolito Mejia, although he ended up supporting Ocon some timidezó the candidacy of his party in the presidential elections that marked the return to power of Leonel Fernández.

Political offices
Preceded by Jaime David Fernández Mirabal	Vice President of the Dominican Republic; 2000–2004	Succeeded by Rafael Alburquerque
