= Milton Morris (music club proprietor) =

American businessperson, politician and music club proprietor

Milton Morris (1911–November 21, 1983) was an American businessperson, politician, and an influential proprietor of music clubs in Kansas City. He was involved in the careers of various Jazz musicians including Charlie "Yardbird" Parker, Jo Jones and Count Basie.

He also campaigned for political office, running for the place of the governor of Missouri. He made at least three runs for the governorship of Kansas City.

He was born in Kansas City and raised in an orphanage. He died November 21, 1983, aged 71 from suspected heart failure.
