= First Lady of the Dominican Republic =

Official title in the Dominican Republic

- Primera dama de la República Dominicana
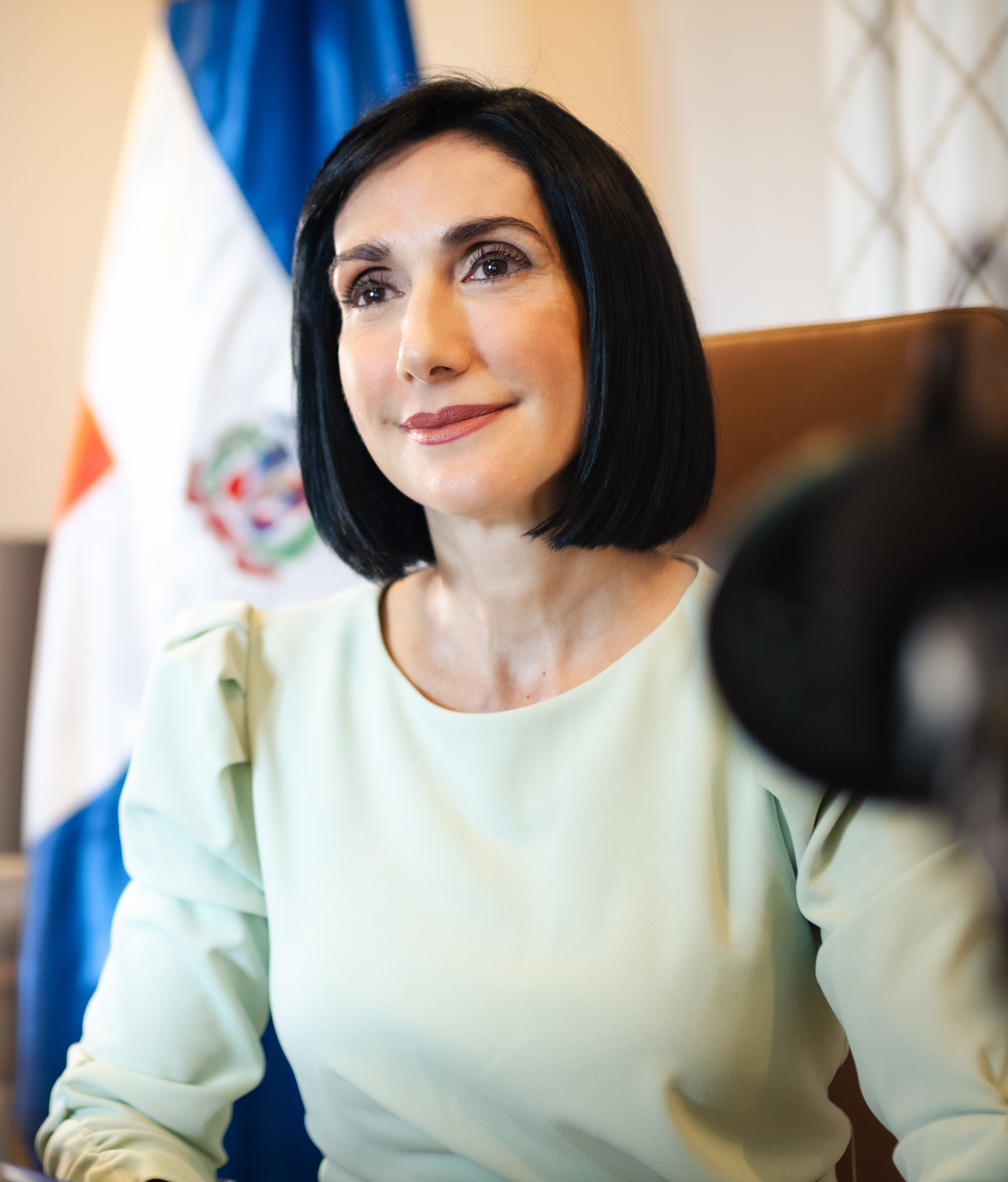
- Incumbent; Raquel Arbaje since August 16, 2020
- Style: Your Excellency, First Lady of the Republic (Excelentísima Señora primera dama de la República); Your Excellency, First Lady (Excelentísima Señora primera dama)
- Inaugural holder: Micaela Antonia Rivera de Soto
- Formation: November 14, 1844 (182 years ago)
- Website: presidencia.gob.do (in Spanish)

First Lady of the Dominican Republic (Spanish: Primera dama de la República Dominicana) is the title referring to the wife, or designee, of the president of the Dominican Republic. The official government Office of the First Lady was created by Decree 741–00 on September 10, 2000.

The position of first lady is not a politically mandated office, and the first lady plays no official role in the government of the Dominican Republic. However, like many other spouses of heads of state and of government, the first lady of the Dominican Republic is a public figure who often contributes to philanthropic causes and acts as an unofficial representative for the head of state. There is a government-funded Office of the First Lady, with a staff.

Raquel Arbaje became the first lady on the election of her husband, Luis Abinader, as president in 2020.
