= Danilo Medina =

President of the Dominican Republic from 2012 to 2020

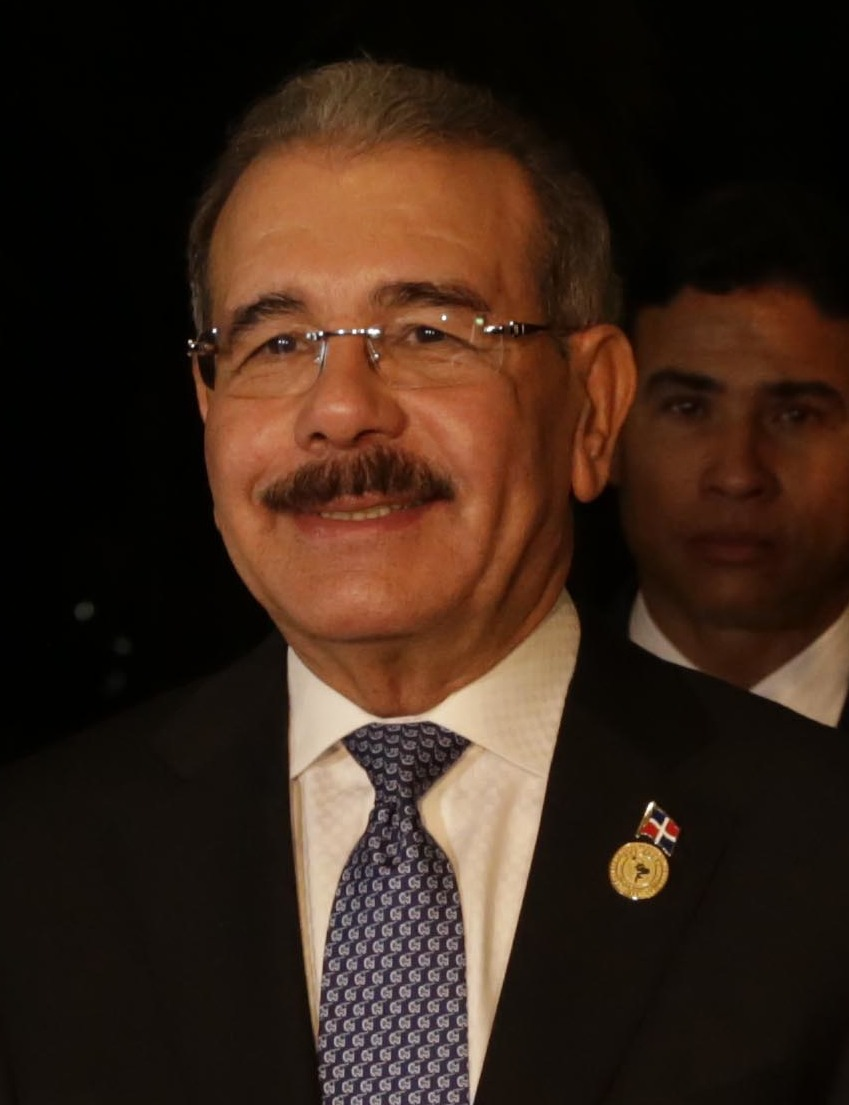
- Medina in 2017

53rd President of the Dominican Republic
- In office 16 August 2012 – 16 August 2020
- Vice President: Margarita Cedeño
- Preceded by: Leonel Fernández
- Succeeded by: Luis Abinader

Secretary of State of the Presidency
- In office 16 August 2004 – 8 November 2006
- President: Leonel Fernández
- Preceded by: Sergio Grullón
- Succeeded by: César Pina Toribio
- In office 16 August 1996 – 16 August 1999
- President: Leonel Fernández
- Preceded by: Rafael Bello Andino
- Succeeded by: Alejandrina Germán

President of the Chamber of Deputies
- In office 16 August 1994 – 16 August 1995
- Preceded by: Norge Botello
- Succeeded by: José Ramón Fadul

President pro tempore of CELAC
- In office 28 January 2016 – 26 January 2017
- Preceded by: Rafael Correa
- Succeeded by: Salvador Sánchez Cerén

President of the Dominican Liberation Party
- Incumbent
- Assumed office 7 March 2021
- Vice President: Temístocles Montás
- Preceded by: Temístocles Montás

Personal details
- Born: 10 November 1951 (age 74) Bohechío, Dominican Republic
- Party: Dominican Liberation Party (1983–present)
- Spouse: Cándida Montilla (m. 1987)
- Children: Candy Sibeli; Vanessa Daniela; Ana Paula
- Parents: Juan Pablo Medina (father); Amelia Sánchez (mother)
- Relatives: Lucía Medina (sister); Francisco Caamaño (second-cousin)
- Education: Instituto Tecnológico de Santo Domingo (Lic.)
- Occupation: Politician
- Profession: Economist
- Awards: Order of Excellence (2017)
- Nickname(s): El Viejo Dany (The Old Dany); El Titán de Bronze (The Bronze Titan)

Danilo Medina Sánchez (Latin American Spanish pronunciation: [daˈnilo meˈðina ˈsantʃes]; born 10 November 1951) is a Dominican politician who was President of the Dominican Republic from 2012 to 2020.

Medina previously served as Chief of Staff to the President of the Dominican Republic from 1996 to 1999 and from 2004 to 2006, and is a member of the Dominican Liberation Party (PLD). He won the May 2012 Dominican presidential election, defeating Hipòlito Mejía with 51% of the votes. On 15 May 2016, Danilo Medina leading a coalition of parties won the 2016 Dominican presidential election, defeating the leader of the opposition and PRM candidate Luis Abinader with 61.8% of the votes, the highest percentage received by a president elected in free elections since 1924 when Horacio Vásquez won the presidency with 69.8% of the ballots—surpassing Juan Bosch's record of 59.5% obtained in 1962, and Leonel Fernández's 57.1% of the votes obtained in 2004.

Medina's second term has been characterized as humane, transparent and goal-driven by its supporters. With a penchant for performing weekly visits to impoverished rural sections of the country, President Medina finished his second term with a 65% approval rate. However, during his second term there were attempts to seek a third term which was frustrated after a call from the United States Secretary of State Mike Pompeo.

Medina's family, including two of his brothers, are currently being investigated under allegations of corruption, involving traffic of influence by which they benefited under Medina's presidency, obtaining multiple contracts and business with the State. As of November 2020, the investigation process had entered a new phase following the arrests of two of Medina's brothers.

== Early years ==
Medina was born in Arroyo Cano, San Juan Province, in the southwest of the Dominican Republic. He is the oldest of eight brothers born to Juan Pablo Medina de los Santos (1918–2019) and Amelia Sánchez Abreu (1931–2004).

Since he was 18 years old, he was a student leader, founding the San Juan de la Maguana branch of the Frente Revolucionario Estudiantil Nacionalista at the UASD. When Professor Juan Bosch founded the Partido de la Liberación Dominicana in 1973, Medina joined him. He studied economics at Instituto Tecnológico Santo Domingo (INTEC) and graduated magna cum laude in 1984. He has been a member of the Central Committee of the PLD since 1983. In the 1986 election, he was elected a deputy in Congress. In 1987, he married psychologist Cándida Montilla and has three daughters, Sibeli, Vanessa and Ana Paula.

== Career during the 1990s and 2000s ==
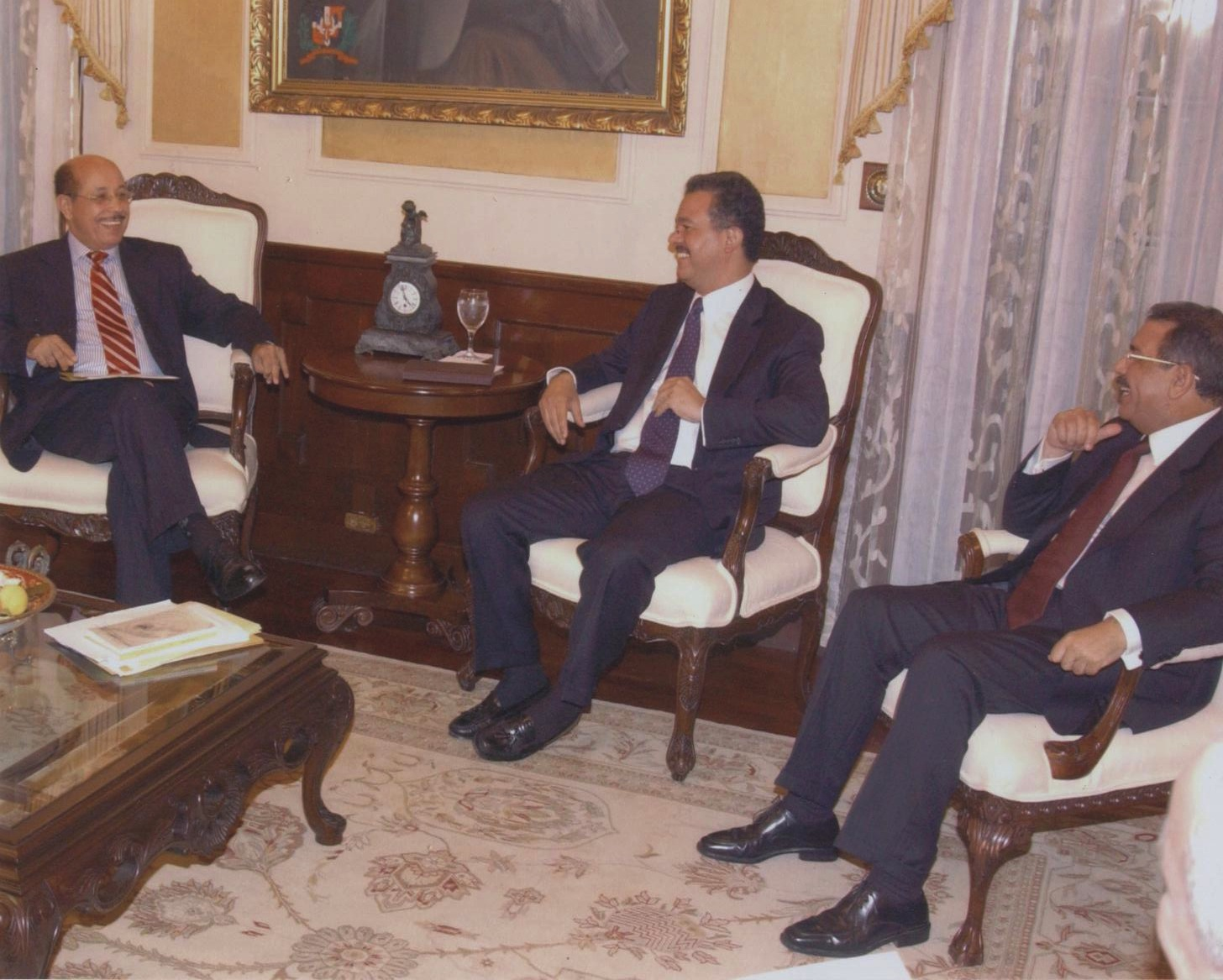
Economic meeting with President Leonel Fernandez and the Ministry of the Presidency Danilo Medina at the National Palace.

In 1990, Medina was elected a member of the Political Committee of the Dominican Liberation Party (PLD) together with Leonel Fernández and Juan Temístocles Montás. He was selected by his political organization to be the President of the Chamber of Deputies in the Dominican Republic.

He was President of the Chamber of Deputies of the Dominican Republic from 1994 to 1995, and subsequently served as Secretary of State of the Presidency from 1996 to 1999 and again from 2004 to 2006.

As president of the Chamber of Deputies in the National Congress (1990–94), he was a key figure in congressional negotiations that led to the resolution of the 1994 political impasse. In that year, a close finish between Joaquín Balaguer and José Francisco Peña Gómez brought about a major conflict, as one side accused the other of fraud. The conflict was resolved with a pact that instituted separate presidential and congressional elections, the need for a candidate to receive 50%+1 of the vote to win in a first round, and prohibited presidential re-election. The agreement eventually worked in favour of the PLD, which won the presidential election in 1996, with Leonel Fernández defeating José Francisco Peña Gómez in a second round.

Medina is considered the PLD's leading political strategist and negotiator. As such, he was one of the leaders of the presidential campaign of President Fernández. He was appointed Secretary of the Presidency in 1996 and was one of the President's closest aides. In 2000, with Fernández barred from reelection (at the time, Dominican presidents could not immediately succeed themselves), Medina was the presidential candidate of the PLD. He finished a distant second behind opposition candidate Hipólito Mejía of the Dominican Revolutionary Party (PRD), taking only 24.9 per cent of the vote to Mejía's 49.87 per cent. However, Medina concluded he had no chance of overcoming Mejía's nearly 25-point first-round lead, especially after third-place finisher Balaguer hinted some of his supporters would vote for the PRD in the runoff. Medina would have needed nearly all of Balaguer's supporters in order to overcome his massive first-round deficit. Realizing that he would be lucky to get half of them in the runoff, Medina conceded the presidency to Mejía. In his concession speech, Medina said that a runoff would not be in the country's best interest.

As President Fernández acceded to a second term in 2004, Medina was once again appointed Secretary of the Presidency (Equivalent to Chief of Staff) and considered second in command on internal corridors of Government. As a new election approached in 2008, Medina was considered the main competition for President Fernández, as he was considered by some to have complete political control of the ruling party, the PLD. He resigned from the post on 8 November 2006 in order to launch his bid for the PLD presidential nomination against President Fernández.

After running a campaign under the slogans "Ahora Es" and "Lo Mejor Para Todos" ("Now Is the Time" and "The Best for Everybody"), Medina was eventually defeated by President Fernández in the 6 May 2007 PLD internal election to choose the party's candidate for the 2008 presidential election. Since its foundation, the PLD had maintained an implicit non-re-election policy, but President Fernández changed that, allowing him to campaign against Medina from the Presidential Palace and opt for a second consecutive term in power (his third).

In the internal PLD vote Medina obtained 28.45% of the votes against President Fernández' 71.55%. Minor irregularities were confirmed during the election process. In the evening of 6 May 2007, Medina made a brief public appearance saying he had been "beaten by the state" (in reference to the fact that government resources had been used to suppress his candidacy and to promote that of Fernández).

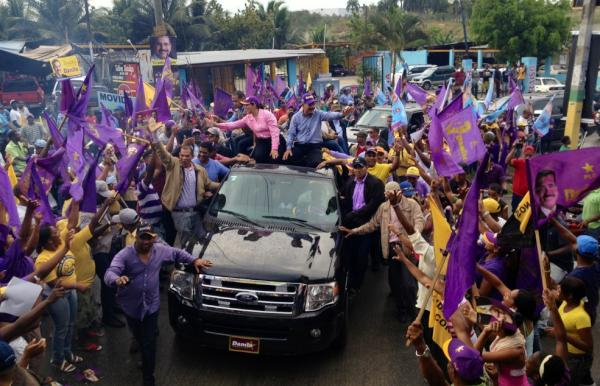
First Lady Margarita Cedeño and Danilo Medina together in a caravan march around the Dominican Republic in March 2012

Subsequently, Medina and his supporters maintained a low profile. During this period, he was considered the most likely contender for the PLD candidacy in the 2012 Dominican presidential election.

== President of the Dominican Republic ==
Medina ran for and was elected President of the Dominican Republic in the 2012 Dominican presidential election, which ended on the morning of 21 May, with 51.24% of the votes, defeating Hipólito Mejía, his 2000 election rival. While running for office Medina's thesis was criticized for suspected plagiarism by Génove Gneco, the professor coordinating the Office against plagiarism in the thesis, of the Universidad Autónoma de Santo Domingo. Gneco also investigated the thesis of senator Félix Bautista and Minister of Economic Affairs Juan Temístocles Montás. He was later removed from his position for overstepping his limits and not being able to prove his claims. Medina vowed to fight corruption, create jobs and invest in education in the Caribbean nation. In the 2016 Dominican presidential election, Medina was re-elected for a second term, defeating the leader of the opposition and PRM candidate Luis Abinader with 61.8% of the votes.

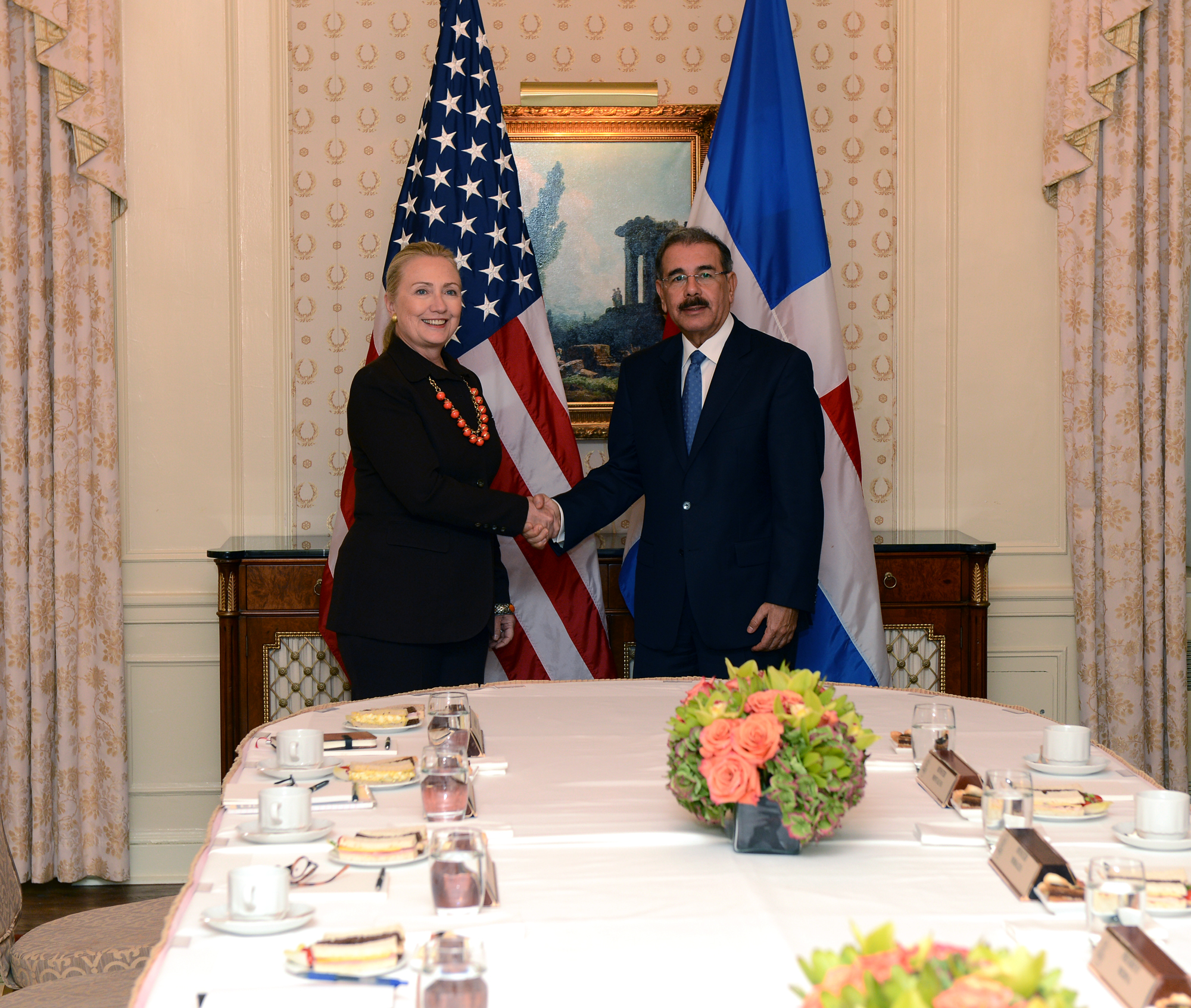
Hillary Clinton and Danilo Medina

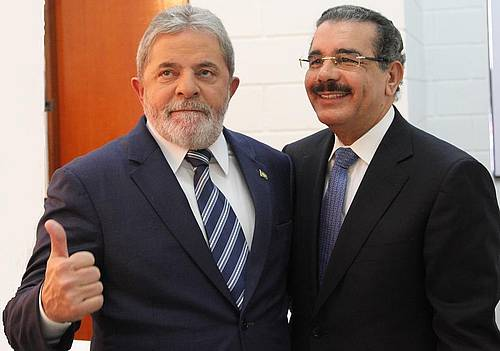
Lula da Silva and Danilo Medina

His government aligned itself with that of the United States in international relations. On Venezuela, he refused to recognise President Nicolas Maduro and supported Juan Guaido, an opposition leader. He and other pro-US Caribbean leaders were summoned to a meeting with Donald Trump in March 2019 to define a common policy on the situation in Venezuela and China's "predatory economic practices".

Following his term in office, Medina's family is currently being investigated for using political and family ties to accumulate wealth during his term as president. The process is being overseen by PEPCA (Government anti-corruption prosecution) and the Deputy Attorney General of the Dominican Republic. As of November 2020, the investigation moved into a new stage with the arrest of two of Medina's brothers.

== Ancestry ==
According to genealogist Sinecio Ramírez Suazo, Danilo Medina is allegedly descended from Francisco del Rosario Sánchez, the founding father of the Dominican Republic. If true, Medina would be the first Dominican President descended from one of the Founding Fathers; however, genealogist Edwin Espinal argues that Medina's great-great-great-grandfather Dionisio Sánchez Herrera could not be the son of Juan Francisco Sánchez de Peña (Francisco del Rosario Sánchez's son) since Sánchez Herrera was born in 1840 and Sánchez de Peña in 1852.

Chamber of Deputies (Dominican Republic)
Preceded by Norge Botello	President of the Chamber of Deputies; 1994–1995	Succeeded by Ramón Fadul
Political offices
Preceded by Rafael Bello Andino	Secretary of State of the Presidency; 1996–1999	Succeeded by Alejandrina Germán
Preceded by Sergio Grullón	Secretary of State of the Presidency; 2004–2006	Succeeded by César Pina Toribio
Preceded by Leonel Fernández	President of the Dominican Republic; 2012–2020	Succeeded by Luis Abinader
Diplomatic posts
Preceded by Rafael Correa	President pro tempore of CELAC; 2016–2017	Succeeded by Salvador Sánchez Cerén
