= Santo Domingo =

Capital and largest city of the Dominican Republic

- Capital city
- Santo Domingo de Guzmán
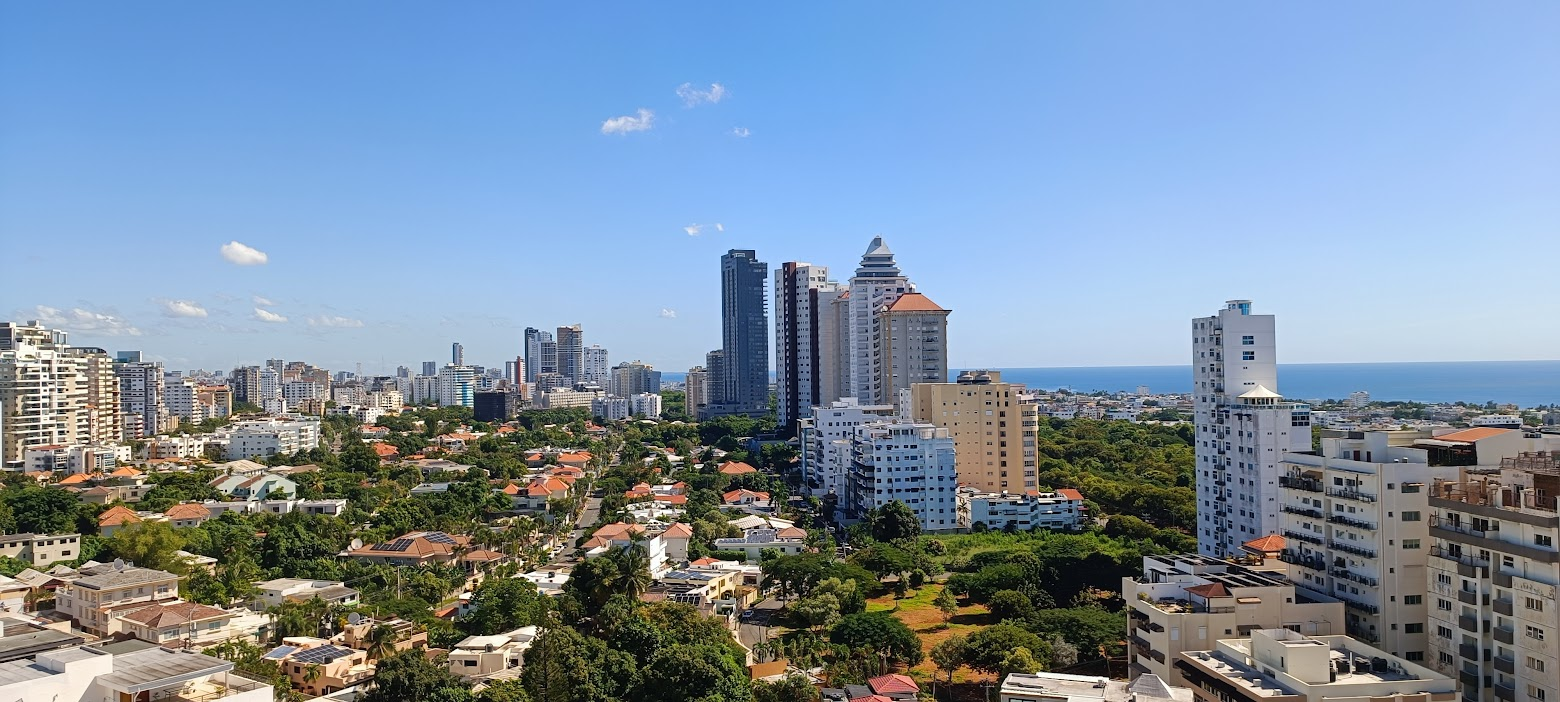
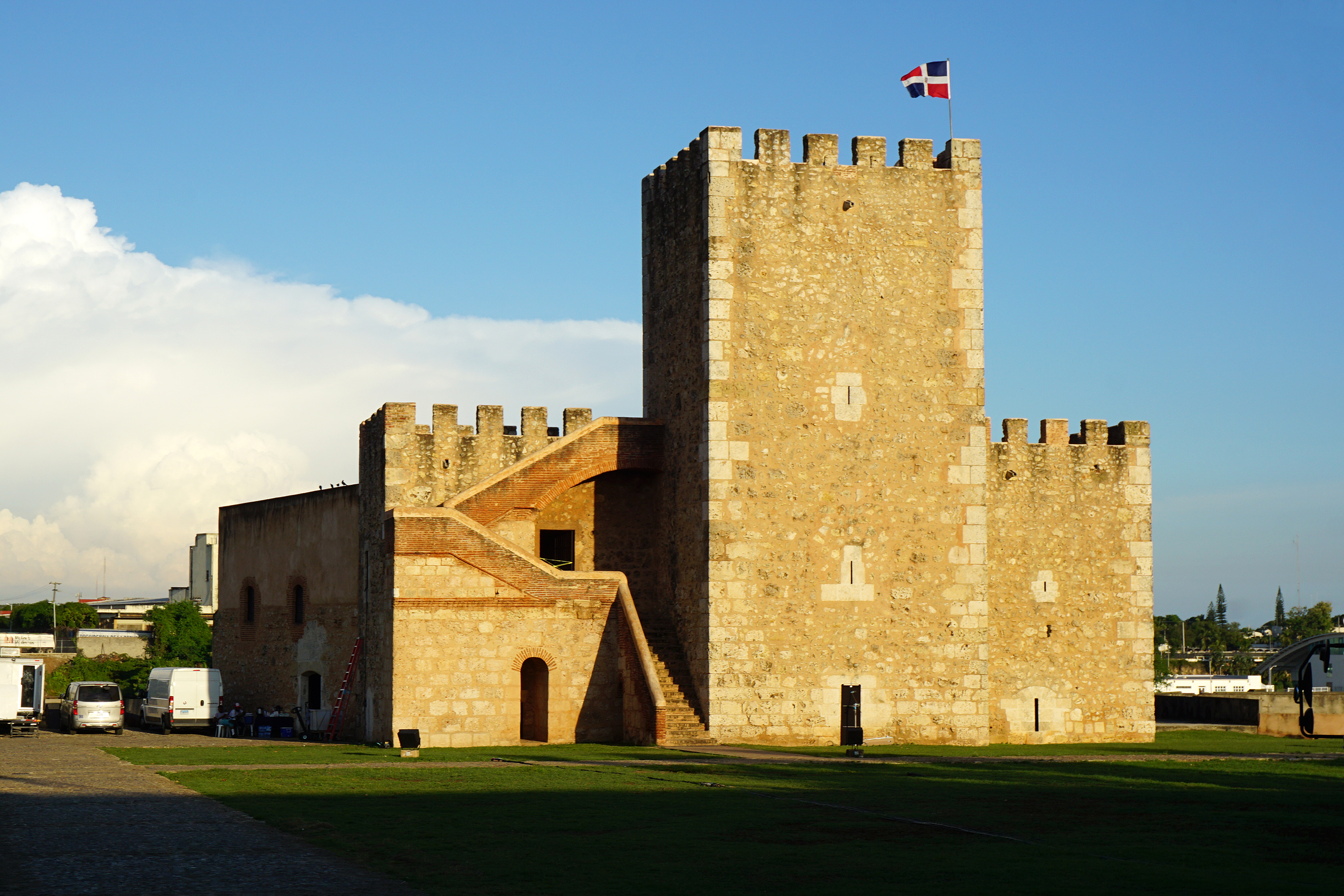
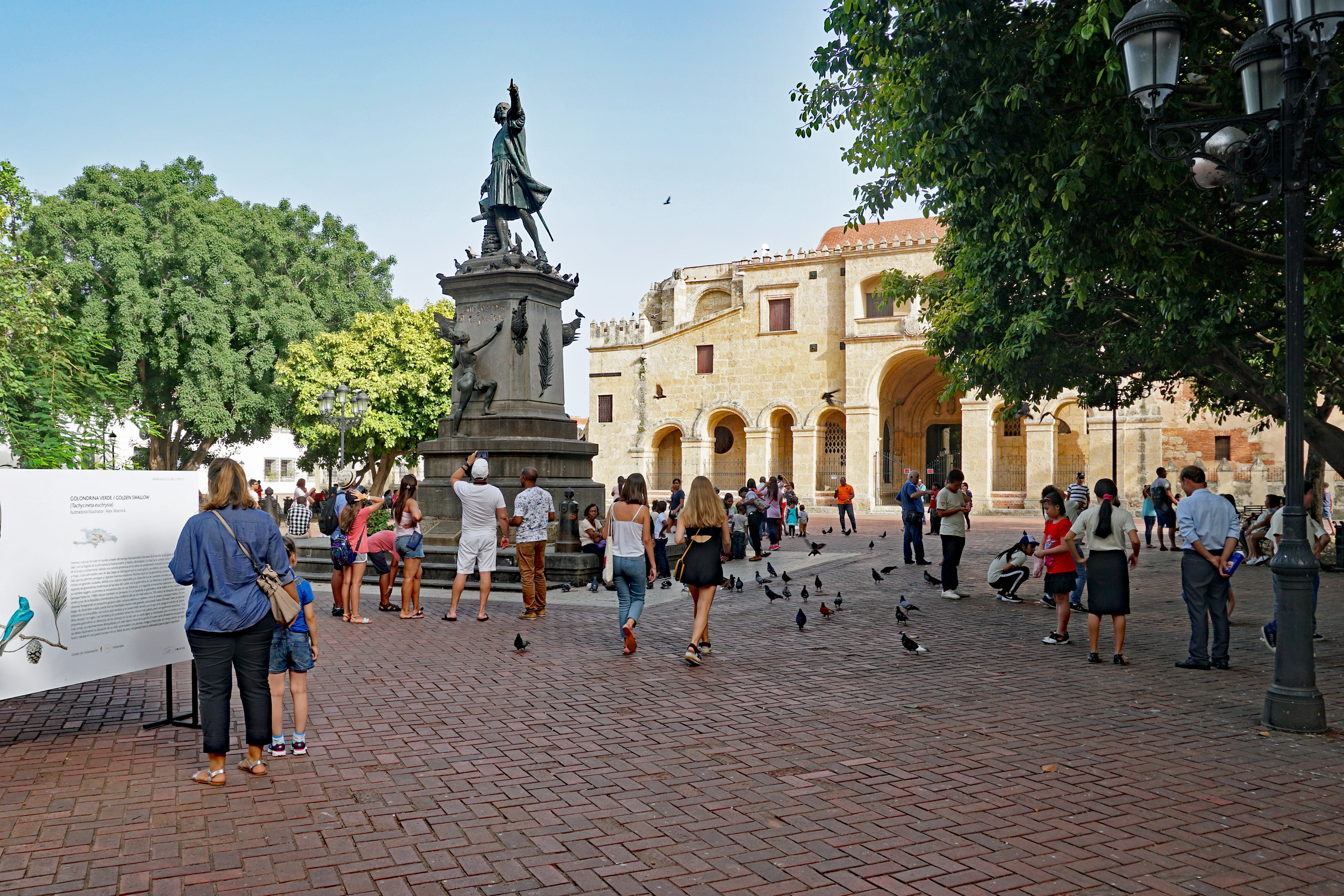
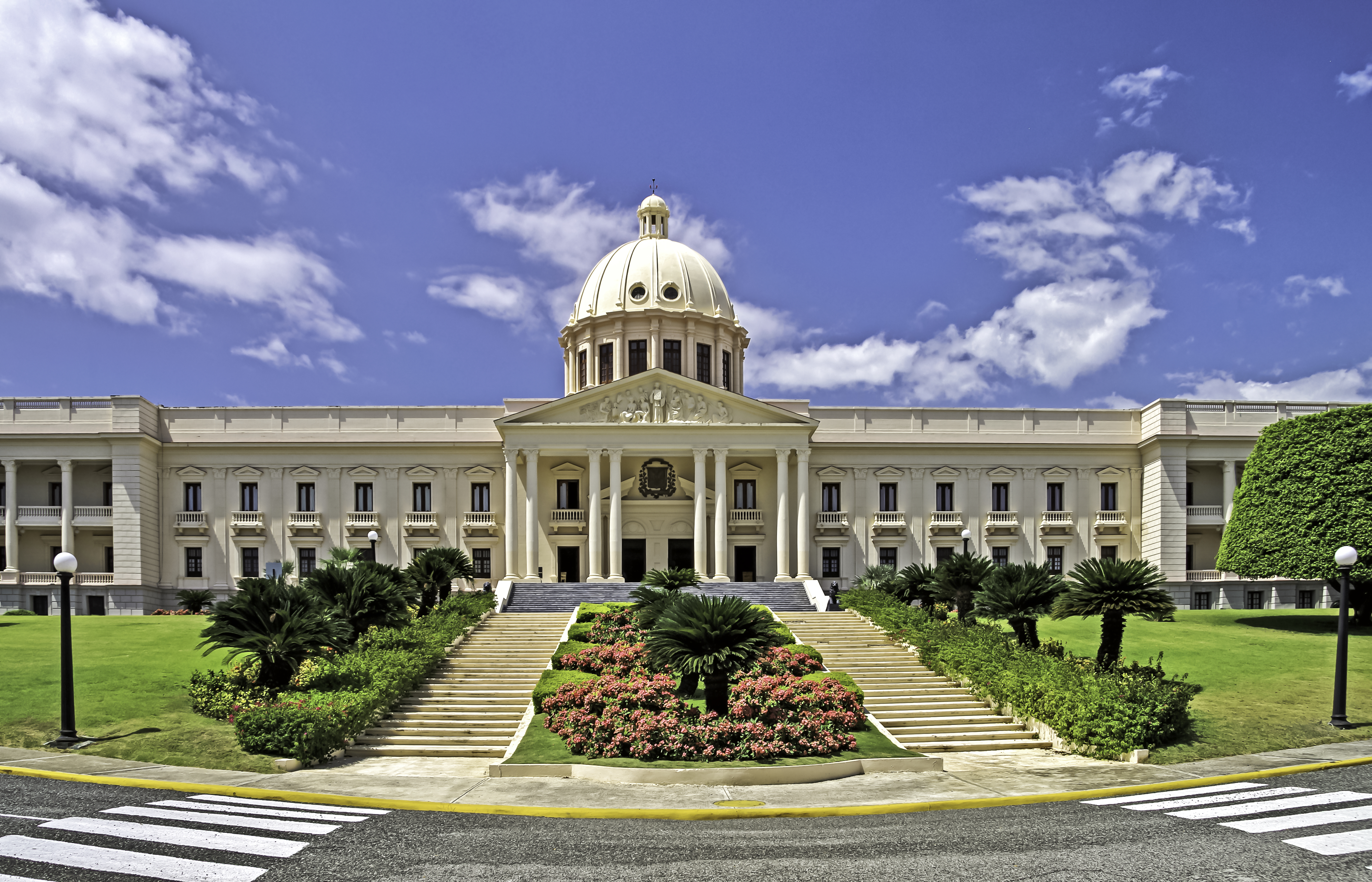
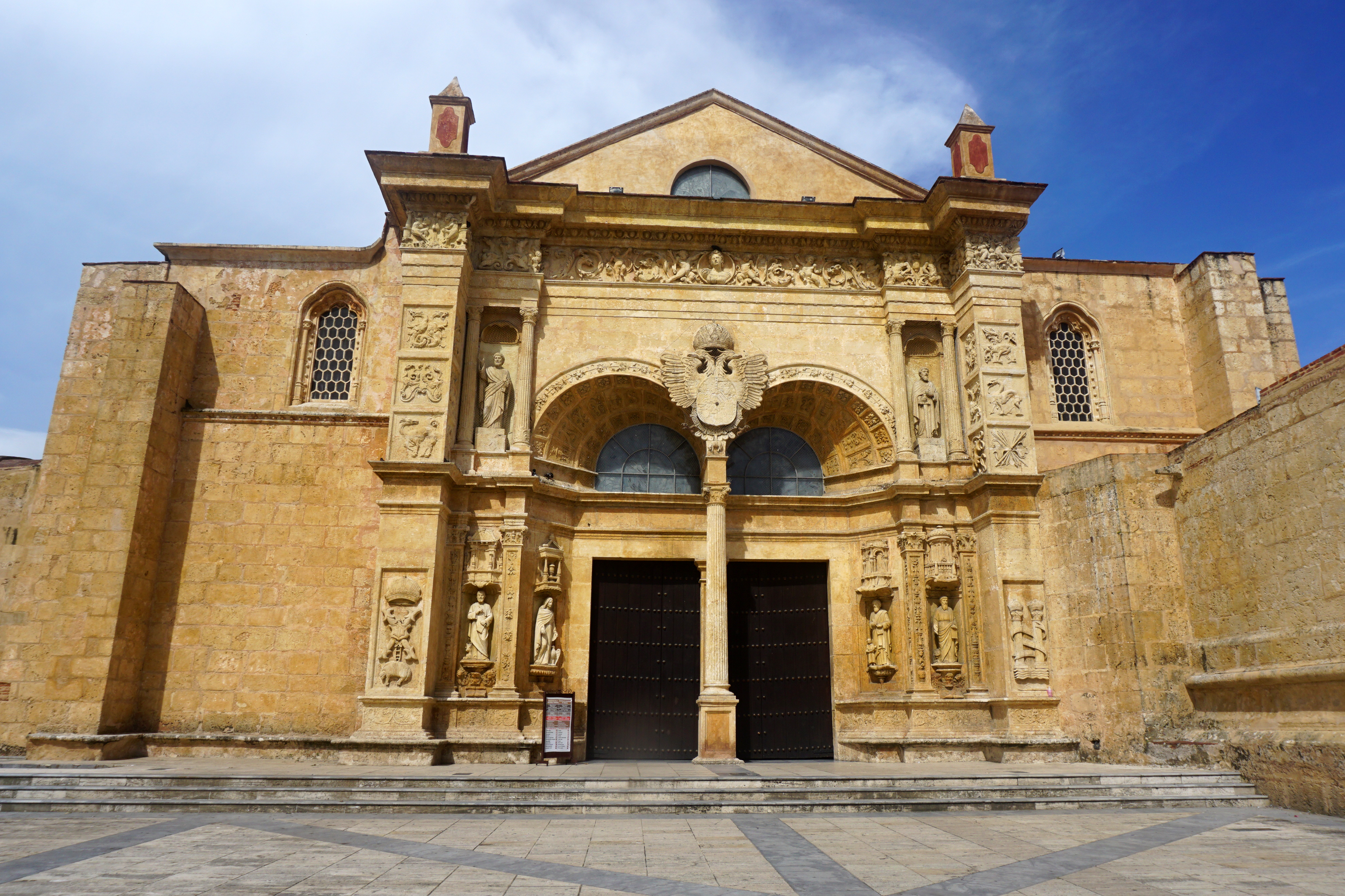
- Santo Domingo skyline Fortaleza Ozama Parque Colón National Palace Cathedral of Santo Domingo

- Flag Coat of arms
- Motto: "Ciudad Primada de América" (in Spanish) ("First City of America")
- Interactive map of Santo Domingo
- Location within the Dominican Republic Location within the Caribbean Location within North America
- Coordinates: 18°27′45″N 69°56′10″W
- Country: Dominican Republic
- District: Distrito Nacional
- Founded: 5 August 1496 (530 years ago)
- Founder: Bartholomew Columbus
- Named for: Saint Dominic de Guzmán

Government
  - Mayor: Carolina Mejía (PRM)

Area
  - Total: 1,502 km^{2} (580 sq mi)
  - Metro: 2,770.00 km^{2} (1,069.50 sq mi)
- Elevation: 14 m (46 ft)

Population (November 2022)
  - Total: 1,029,110
  - Rank: 1st
  - Density: 680/km^{2} (1,800/sq mi)
  - Urban: 1,029,110
  - Metro: 4,274,651 (Note: The metro area is defined as the municipalities belonging to the Commonwealth of the Greater Santo Domingo (Mancomunidad del Gran Santo Domingo). These municipalities are: Distrito Nacional, Santo Domingo Este, Santo Domingo Norte, Santo Domingo Oeste, Los Alcarrizos, Boca Chica, Pedro Brand, San Antonio de Guerra, San Cristóbal, Bajos de Haina, and San Gregorio de Nigua.)
- Demonym: Spanish: Capitaleño (fem. Capitaleña)

Metro area GDP (PPP, constant 2015 values)
  - Year: 2023
  - Total: $73.7 billion
  - Per capita: $20,900
- Time zone: UTC−04:00 (AST)
- Postal codes: 10100–10699 (Distrito Nacional)
- Area codes: 809, 829, 849
- Website: adn.gob.do (in Spanish)

UNESCO World Heritage Site
- Official name: Colonial City of Santo Domingo
- Type: Cultural
- Criteria: ii, iv, vi
- Designated: 1990 (14th session)
- Reference no.: 526
- Region: Latin America and the Caribbean

Santo Domingo, (Note: English: /ˌsæntoʊ dəˈmɪŋɡoʊ/ SAN-toh də-MING-goh, Spanish: [ˈsanto ðoˈmiŋɡo]; named after Saint Dominic.) officially known as Santo Domingo de Guzmán, is the capital and largest city of the Dominican Republic and the largest metropolitan area in the Caribbean by population. As of 2022, the city center had a population of 1,029,110 while its metropolitan area, Greater Santo Domingo, had a population of 4,274,651. The city is coterminous with the boundaries of the Distrito Nacional (D.N., National District), (Note: The National District (D.N.) strictly refers to the city proper (i.e. excluding the surrounding province).) itself bordered on three sides by Santo Domingo Province.

Santo Domingo was founded in 1496 by the Spanish Empire and is the oldest continuously inhabited European settlement in the Americas. It was the first seat of Spanish colonial rule in the New World, the Captaincy General of Santo Domingo. Santo Domingo is the site of the first university, cathedral, castle, monastery, and fortress in the New World. The city's Colonial Zone was declared as a World Heritage Site by UNESCO. Santo Domingo was called Ciudad Trujillo (pronounced [sjuˈðað tɾuˈxiʝo]), from 1936 to 1961, after the Dominican Republic's dictator, Rafael Trujillo, named the capital after himself. Following his assassination, the city resumed its original designation.

Santo Domingo is the cultural, financial, political, commercial and industrial center of the Dominican Republic, with the vast majority of the country's industries being located within the city. Santo Domingo also serves as the chief seaport of the country. The city's harbor at the mouth of the Ozama River accommodates the largest vessels, and the port handles both heavy passenger- and freight traffic.

== History ==
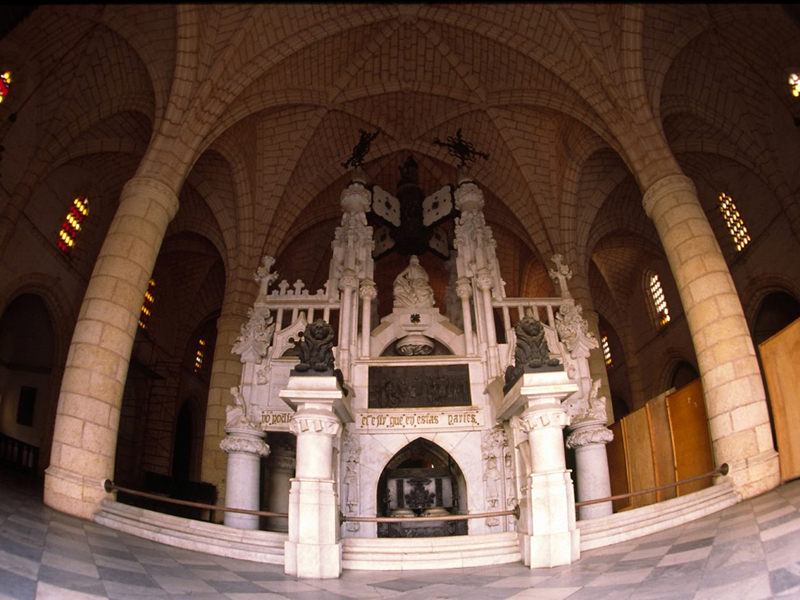
Tomb that housed the remains of Christopher Columbus until 1795 (at the cathedral)

Prior to the arrival of Christopher Columbus in 1492, the native Taíno people populated the island which they called Kiskeya (mother of all lands) and Ayiti (the land of the high mountains), and which Columbus later named Hispaniola, including the territory of today's Republic of Haiti. At the time, the island's territory consisted of five chiefdoms: Marién, Maguá, Maguana, Jaragua, and Higüey. These were ruled respectively by caciques (chiefs) Guacanagarix, Guarionex, Caonabo, Bohechío, and Cayacoa.

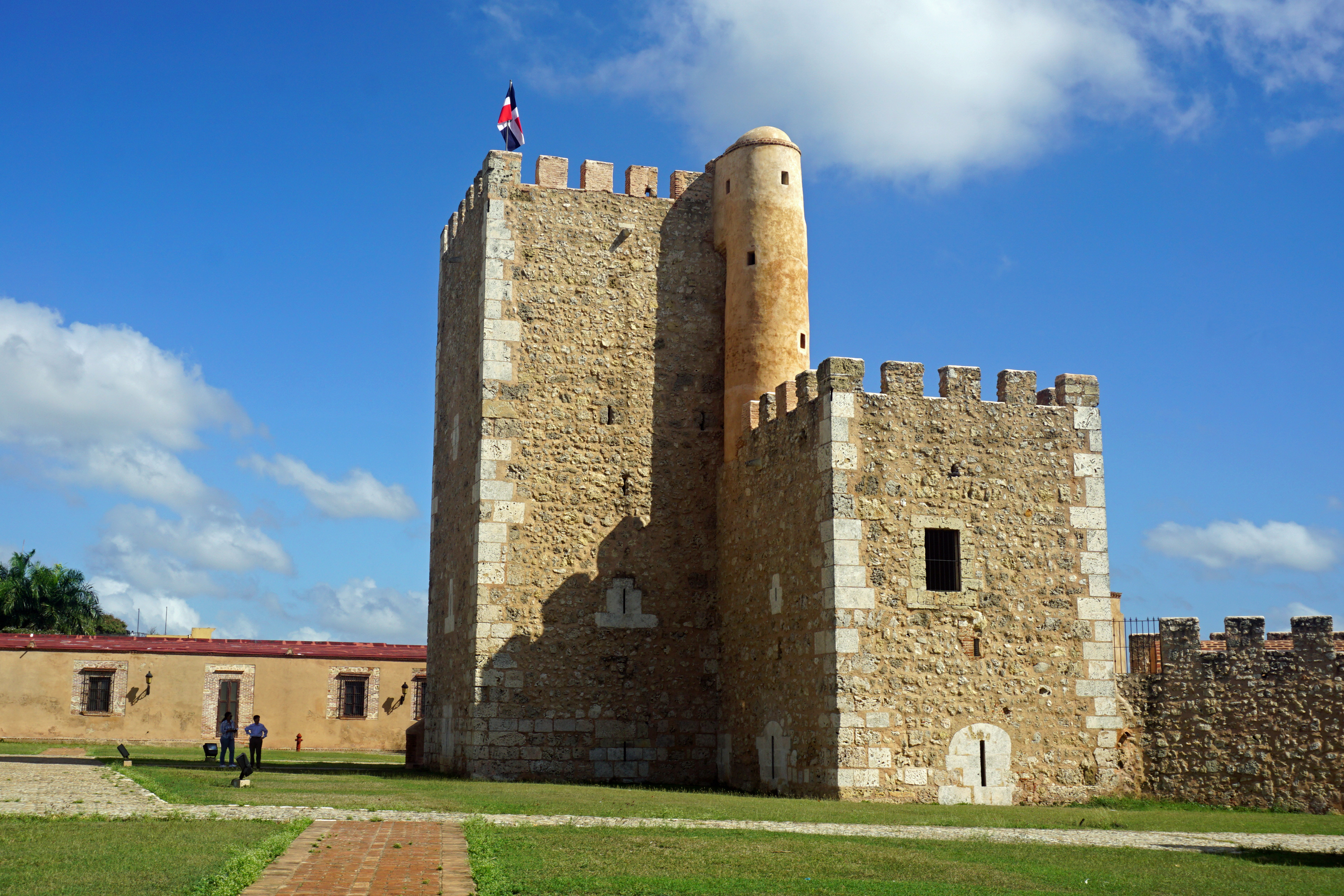
The Ozama Fortress is one of the surviving sections of the Walls of Santo Domingo, which is recognized by UNESCO as being the oldest military construction of European origin in the Americas.

Dating from 1493, when the Spanish settled on the island, and officially from 5 August 1498, Santo Domingo became the oldest European city in the Americas. Bartholomew Columbus founded the settlement and named it La Nueva Isabela, after La Isabela, an earlier settlement in the north named after the Queen of Spain Isabella I. In 1495 it was renamed "Santo Domingo", in honor of Saint Dominic. Santo Domingo came to be known as the "Gateway to the Caribbean" and the chief town in Hispaniola from then on. Expeditions which led to Ponce de León's colonization of Puerto Rico, Diego Velázquez de Cuéllar's colonization of Cuba, Hernán Cortés' conquest of Mexico, and Vasco Núñez de Balboa's sighting of the Pacific Ocean were all launched from Santo Domingo.

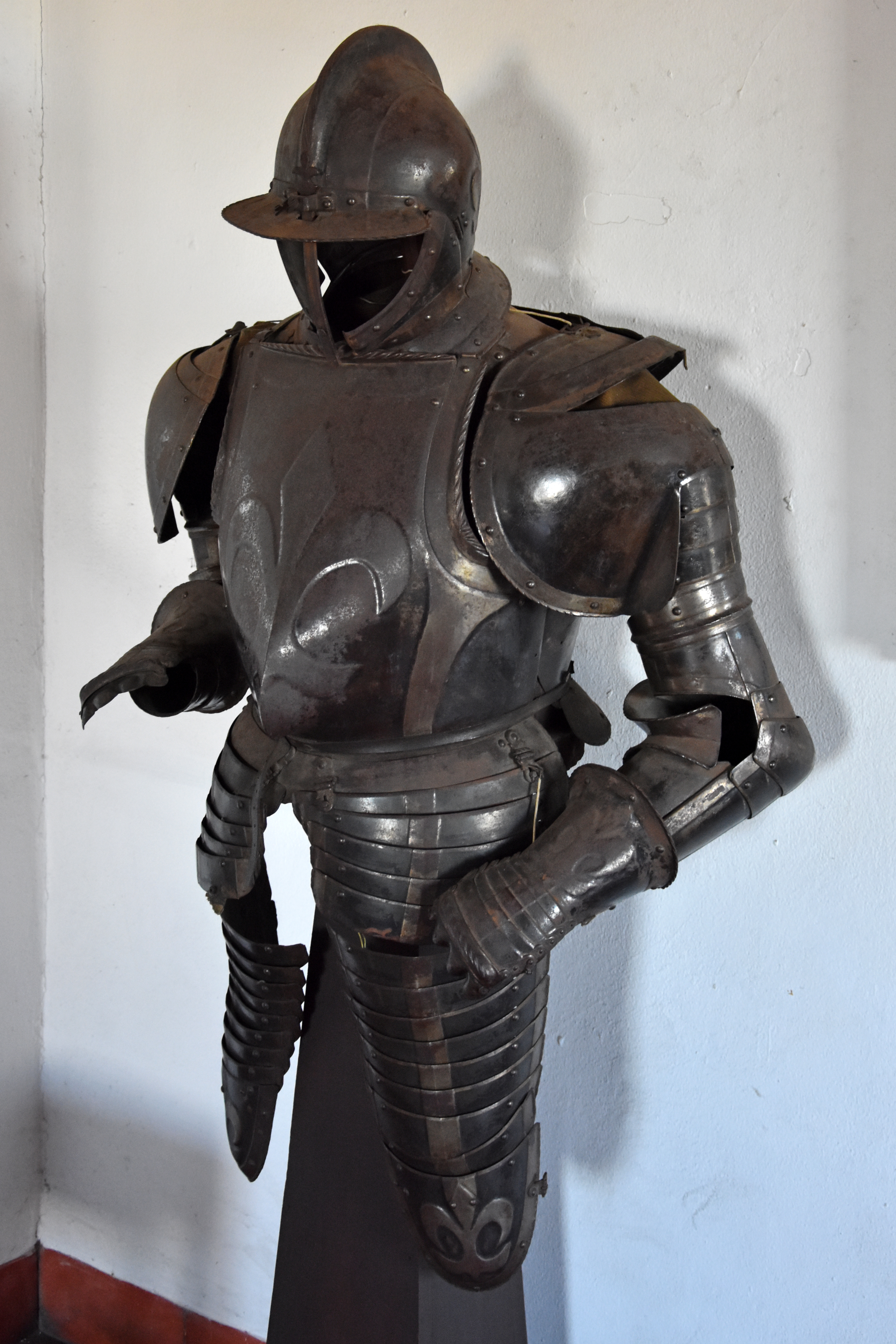
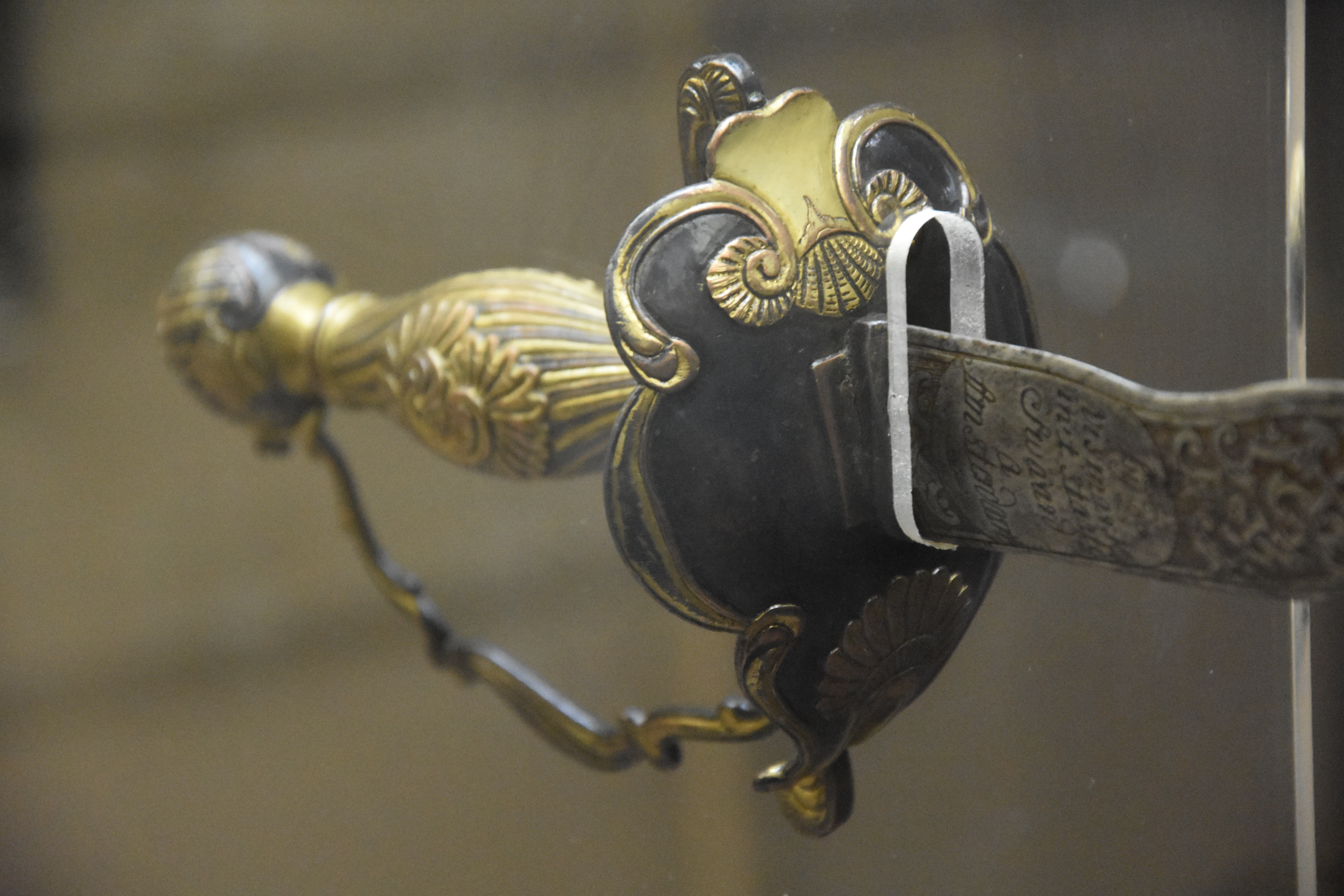
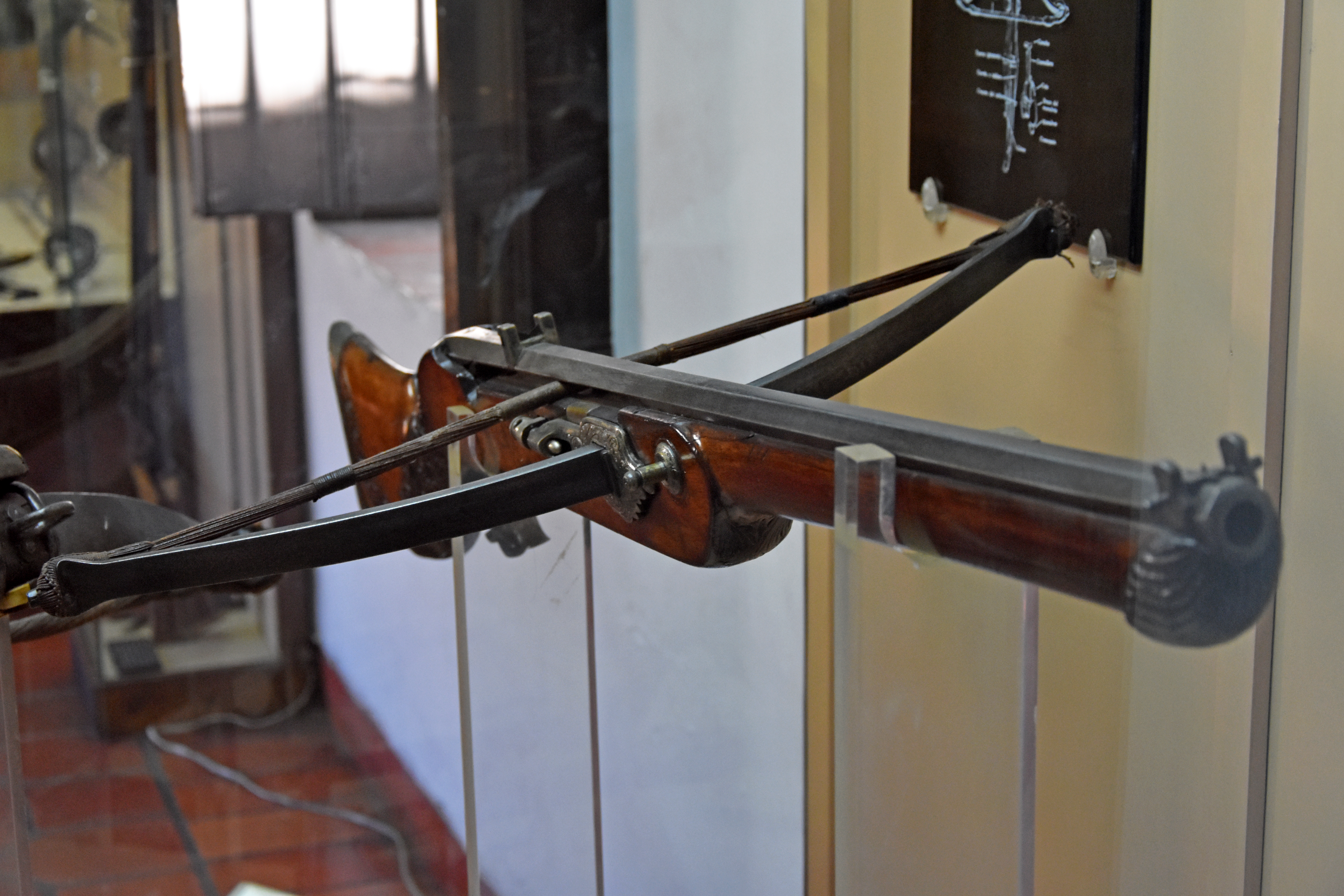
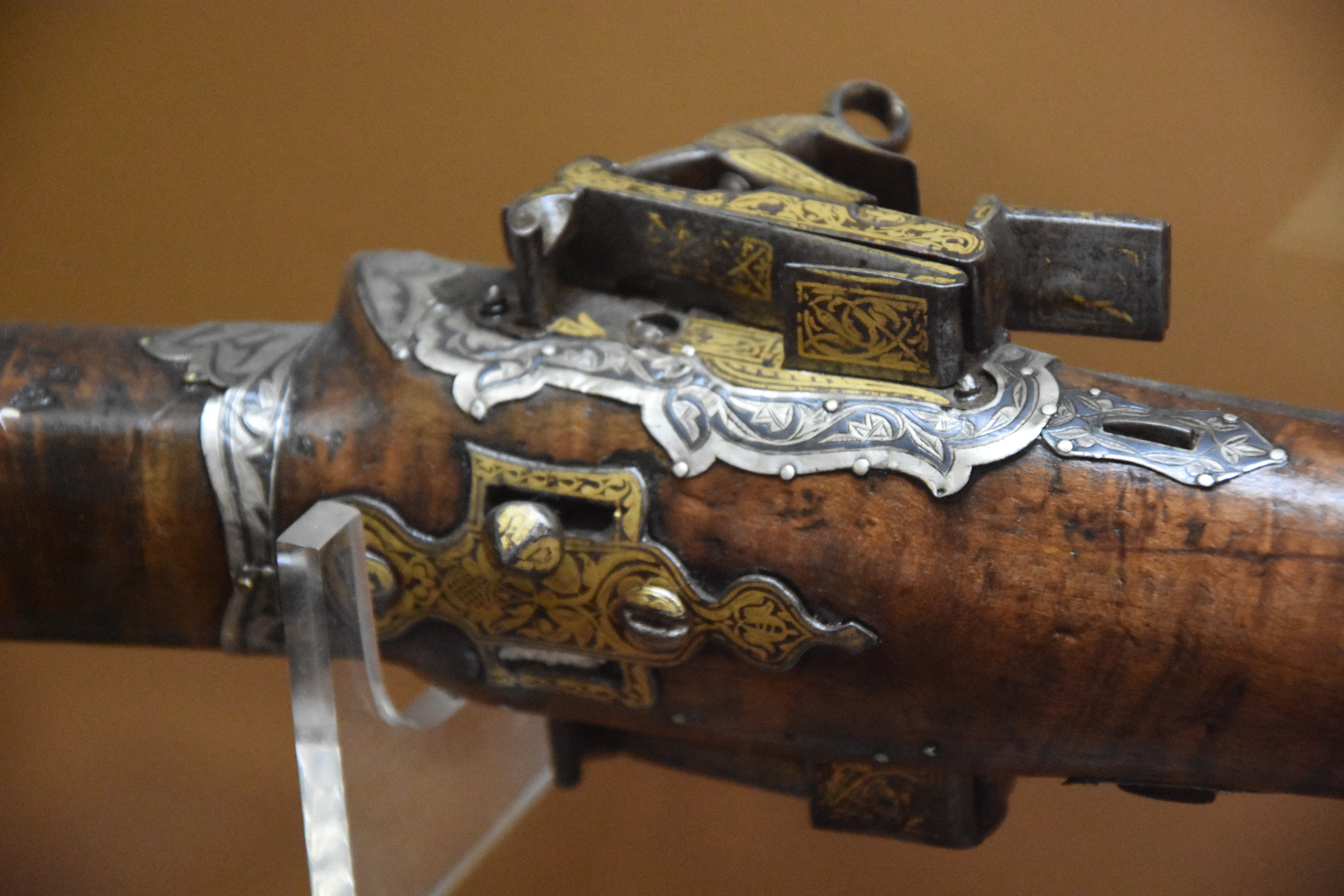
Colonial era weapons and armor in Museum of the Royal Houses.

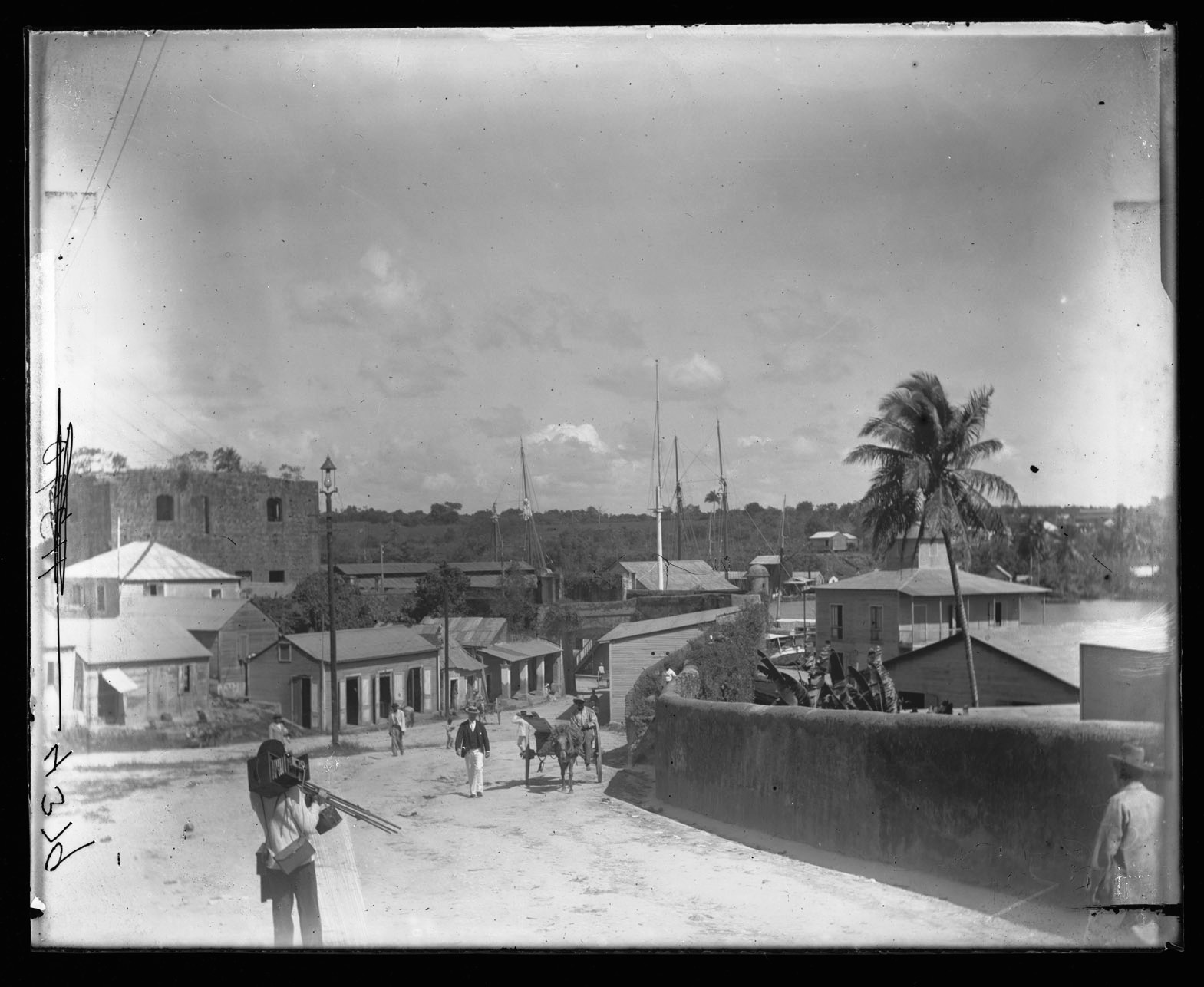
Colonial Wall surrounding Santo Domingo, in 1899, Allison V. Armour Expedition

In June 1502, Santo Domingo was destroyed by a major hurricane, and the new Governor Nicolás de Ovando had it rebuilt on a different site on the other side of the Ozama River. The original layout of the city and a large portion of its defensive wall can still be appreciated today throughout the Colonial Zone, declared a World Heritage Site by UNESCO.

Diego Columbus, Christopher Columbus's son, arrived in 1509, assuming the powers of Viceroy and admiral. In 1512, Ferdinand established a Real Audiencia with Juan Ortiz de Matienzo, Marcelo de Villalobos, and Lucas Vázquez de Ayllón appointed as judges of appeal. In 1514, Pedro Ibanez de Ibarra arrived with the Laws of Burgos. Diego de Medrano, from Soria, was appointed royal treasurer of Santo Domingo. Rodrigo de Alburquerque was named repartidor de indios and soon named visitadores to enforce the laws.

The first major slave revolt in the Americas occurred in Santo Domingo during 1521, when enslaved Africans led an uprising on Diego Colombus's sugar plantation. In 1586, the privateer Sir Francis Drake captured the city and held it for ransom. A report which reached the English government in May 1586 states that from Santo Domingo he took away 1,200 Englishmen, Frenchmen, Flemings, and "Provincials out of prison, besides 800 of the countrey people". Drake's successful capture signaled the decline of Spain's dominion over Hispaniola, which was accentuated in the early 17th century by Spanish policies that resulted in the depopulation of most of the island outside of the capital. An expedition sent by Oliver Cromwell in 1655 attacked the city of Santo Domingo, but the English force was repulsed by a smaller force of local militias (Note: The English troops withdrew and took the less guarded colony of Jamaica instead.) and Santo Domingo suffered only 25 dead. In 1697, the Treaty of Ryswick included the acknowledgement by Spain of France's dominion over the Western third of the island, now Haiti. During the 18th century, privateers from Santo Domingo patrolled the Caribbean, capturing numerous enemy merchantment.

From 1795 to 1822, the city changed hands several times along with the colony it headed. It was ceded to France in 1795. The city was briefly captured by Haitian rebels in 1801, recovered by France in 1802, endured a failed invasion from Haiti in 1805, and was once again reclaimed by Spain in 1809. In 1821, Santo Domingo became the capital of an independent nation called the Republic of Spanish Haiti after the Criollo bourgeois within the country, led by José Núñez de Cáceres, overthrew the Spanish crown. The nation was annexed by Haiti just two months later. The city and the colony lost much of their Spanish-born peninsular population as a result of these events which caused a great deal of instability and unrest.

On 27 February 1844, Santo Domingo was again the capital of a free nation, when it gained its independence from Haiti, led by Dominican nationalist Juan Pablo Duarte. The city was a prize fought over by various political factions over the succeeding decades of instability. In addition, the country had to fight multiple battles with Haiti; the Battle of 19 March, Battle of 30 March, Battle of Las Carreras, and Battle of Beler, are a few of the most prominent encounters, mentioned in the national anthem and with city streets named after them. Dominican victory in these engagements thwarted the advance of the Haitian army towards Santo Domingo during the Dominican War of Independence. In 1861, Spain returned to the country, having struck a bargain with Dominican dictator Pedro Santana whereby the latter was granted several honorific titles and privileges, in exchange for annexing the young nation back to Spanish rule. The Dominican Restoration War began in 1863 however, and in 1865 the Bourbon Queen Isabella II withdrew her soldiers from the island. Over the next two-thirds of a century Santo Domingo and the Dominican Republic went through many revolutions and power changes. Santo Domingo would experience the first of two U.S. invasions in 1916 when different leaders fought for presidential power and control of the city. The United States intervened, instituting a military leader, Harry Shepard Knapp. U.S. Marines and Dominicans clashed in Santo Domingo on 24–25 October 1916, resulting in the deaths of two U.S. Marines and three Dominicans.

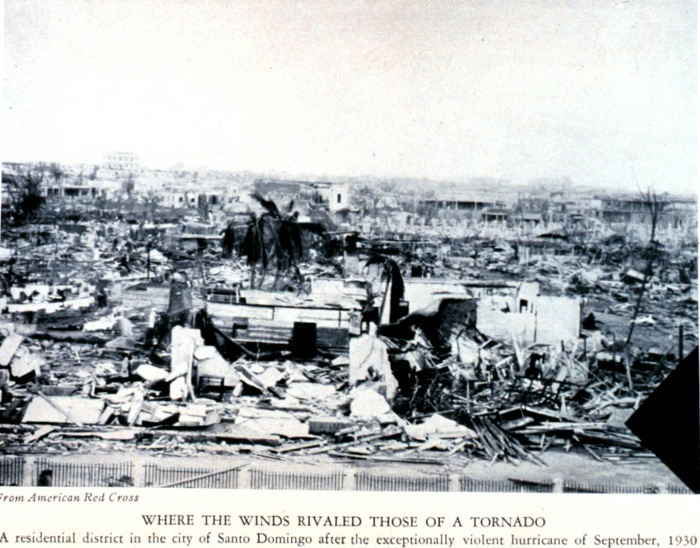
Destruction of Santo Domingo after the hurricane

The city was struck by hurricane San Zenón in 1930, which caused major damage and killed up to 8,000 people. After its rebuilding, Santo Domingo was known officially as Ciudad Trujillo due to the personality cult imposed by dictator Rafael Leónidas Trujillo, who governed from 1930. Following his assassination in 1961 the city was once again renamed to Santo Domingo.

In 1962, Juan Bosch was elected to the presidency. He was overthrown seven months later, resulting in a civil war in the capital. Francisco Caamaño led the Constitucionalistas fighting to restore democracy. This would lead to the second U.S. invasion in 1965. U.S. troops engaged in heavy fighting in the streets of Santo Domingo against the Constitucionalistas on 15 and 16 June. Newsweek described it this way:

Amid the clatter of automatic weapons, the sharp rattle of .50-caliber guns and the heavy explosions of bazookas and recoilless rifles, the paratroopers of the 82nd U.S. Airborne Division blasted their way four city blocks into Caamaño's bastion. Heavy fire from U.S. guns across the Ozama River ringed rebel headquarters on El Conde Street, shattered buildings and started huge fires.

Eventually, the fighting would end on 31 August 1965, with 2,850 Dominicans and 44 American servicemen dead.

The year 1992 marked the 500th anniversary, El Quinto Centenario, of Christopher Columbus' Discovery of the Americas. The Columbus Lighthouse – Faro a Colón – was erected in Santo Domingo in honor of this occasion, with an approximate cost of 400 million Dominican pesos.

== Geography ==
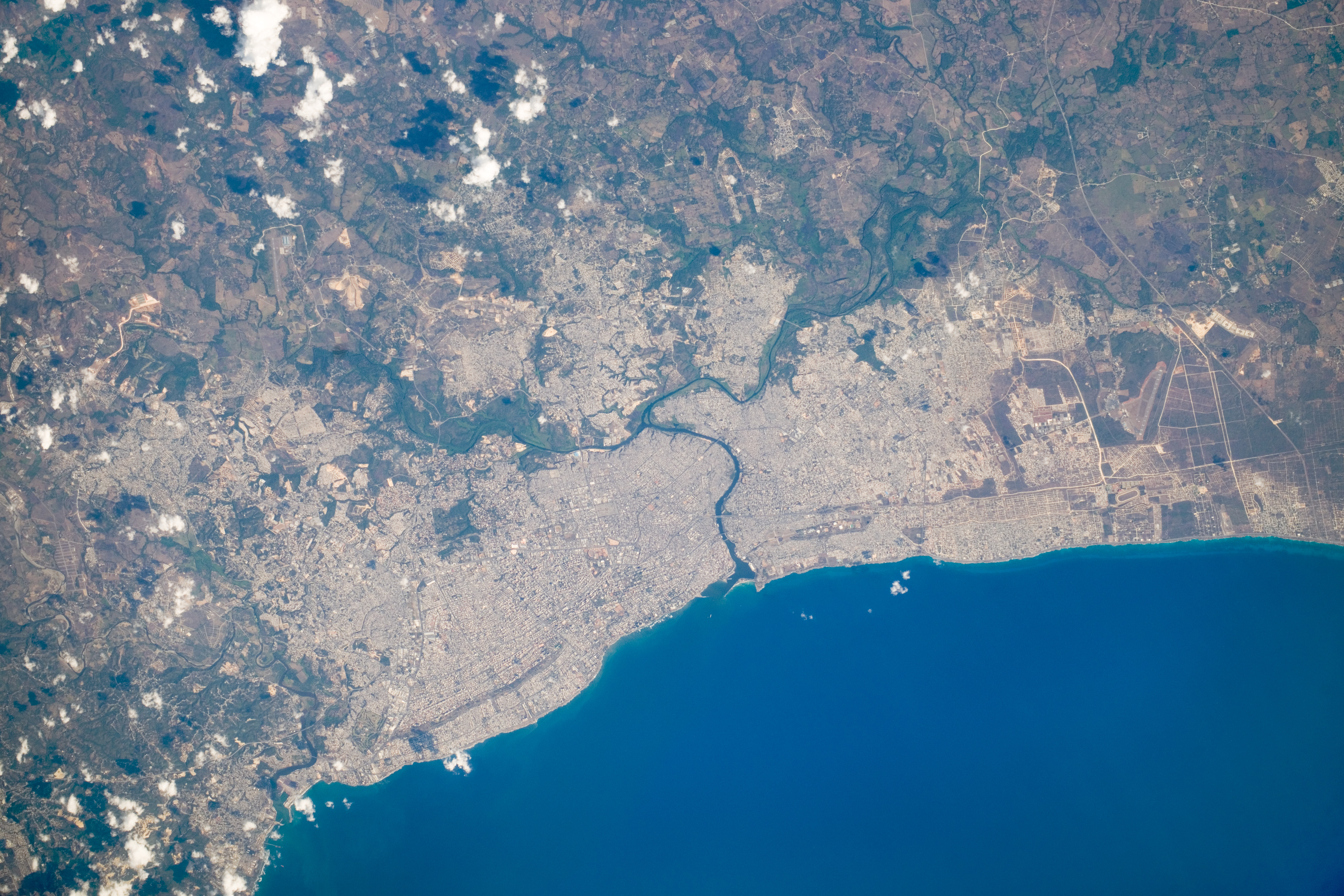
View of Santo Domingo from space, 2010

Santo Domingo is located on the southern coast of the island of Hispaniola, along the Caribbean Sea, and is the capital of the Dominican Republic. The city sits at the mouth of the Ozama River, which divides it into eastern and western sections, with the historic Colonial Zone on the west side. Its geography is characterized by a coastal plain with flat to gently rolling terrain, and the surrounding region includes some low limestone hills. The city has a tropical climate, marked by high humidity and warm temperatures year-round, with a rainy season from May to November. Its coastal location and natural harbor have historically made it an important port and commercial hub in the Caribbean.

The Ozama River flows 148 kilometers (92 miles) before emptying into the Caribbean Sea. Santo Domingo's position on its banks was of great importance to the city's economic development and the growth of trade during colonial times. The Ozama River is where the country's busiest port is located.

=== Climate ===
The average temperature in Santo Domingo varies little, because the tropical trade winds help mitigate the heat and humidity throughout the year. Thanks to these trade winds, Santo Domingo has a borderline tropical rainforest (Köppen Af)/tropical monsoon climate (Am), as its driest month is very close to 60 millimeters (2.4 in). However, the city seldom experiences the heat that one may expect to find. December through March are the coolest months with warm days with less humidity and cool nights (temperatures of 17 to 19 °C (63 to 66 °F)). July through September are the hottest. Santo Domingo averages 1,445 millimeters (56.9 in) of rain annually. Its driest months are from December through April; however, due to the trade winds and mountains to the southwest, rain is seen even during these months.

Like many other cities in the Caribbean, Santo Domingo is very susceptible to hurricanes. Hurricane Georges caused severe destruction in September 1998. The lowest recorded temperature has been 11.0 °C (51.8 °F) on 5 February 1951 and 7 January 1957 and the highest is 39.5 °C (103.1 °F) on 29 May 2002.

Climate data for Santo Domingo (1991–2020, extremes 1909–present)
Month	Jan	Feb	Mar	Apr	May	Jun	Jul	Aug	Sep	Oct	Nov	Dec	Year
Record high °C (°F)	34.4 (93.9)	33.9 (93.0)	36.0 (96.8)	37.0 (98.6)	39.5 (103.1)	37.2 (99.0)	37.8 (100.0)	38.8 (101.8)	36.7 (98.1)	38.8 (101.8)	35.0 (95.0)	33.5 (92.3)	39.5 (103.1)
Mean daily maximum °C (°F)	30.0 (86.0)	30.0 (86.0)	30.5 (86.9)	30.9 (87.6)	31.3 (88.3)	31.9 (89.4)	32.2 (90.0)	32.3 (90.1)	32.4 (90.3)	32.0 (89.6)	31.3 (88.3)	30.6 (87.1)	31.3 (88.3)
Daily mean °C (°F)	25.6 (78.1)	25.6 (78.1)	26.1 (79.0)	26.7 (80.1)	27.4 (81.3)	28.0 (82.4)	28.2 (82.8)	28.3 (82.9)	28.2 (82.8)	27.9 (82.2)	27.1 (80.8)	26.2 (79.2)	27.1 (80.8)
Mean daily minimum °C (°F)	21.2 (70.2)	21.2 (70.2)	21.7 (71.1)	22.5 (72.5)	23.5 (74.3)	24.2 (75.6)	24.2 (75.6)	24.3 (75.7)	24.1 (75.4)	23.8 (74.8)	22.9 (73.2)	21.9 (71.4)	23.0 (73.4)
Record low °C (°F)	11.0 (51.8)	11.0 (51.8)	13.3 (55.9)	15.5 (59.9)	16.5 (61.7)	18.6 (65.5)	18.2 (64.8)	18.0 (64.4)	18.0 (64.4)	17.0 (62.6)	17.0 (62.6)	13.0 (55.4)	11.0 (51.8)
Average precipitation mm (inches)	68.1 (2.68)	59.1 (2.33)	54.1 (2.13)	86.3 (3.40)	151.3 (5.96)	119.0 (4.69)	156.7 (6.17)	195.0 (7.68)	191.7 (7.55)	176.9 (6.96)	147.5 (5.81)	76.5 (3.01)	1,482.2 (58.35)
Average rainy days (≥ 1.0 mm)	8.3	6.8	7.0	6.5	10.5	9.3	10.8	11.5	12.1	12.5	10.7	9.1	115.1
Average relative humidity (%)	82.0	81.1	80.1	79.4	82.2	82.2	82.2	83.3	84.0	84.8	84.0	82.6	82.3
Mean monthly sunshine hours	239.7	229.6	253.4	248.8	233.9	232.3	225.9	231.6	219.9	230.7	227.5	224.1	2,797.4
Average ultraviolet index	8	10	12	12	12	12	12	12	12	10	9	7	11
Source 1: NOAA, ONAMET (humidity, rain days, sunshine 1971–2000)
Source 2: Diario Libre (May record high, and record lows for January and February), Meteo Climat (record highs and lows) and Weather Atlas (uv index)

== Cityscape ==
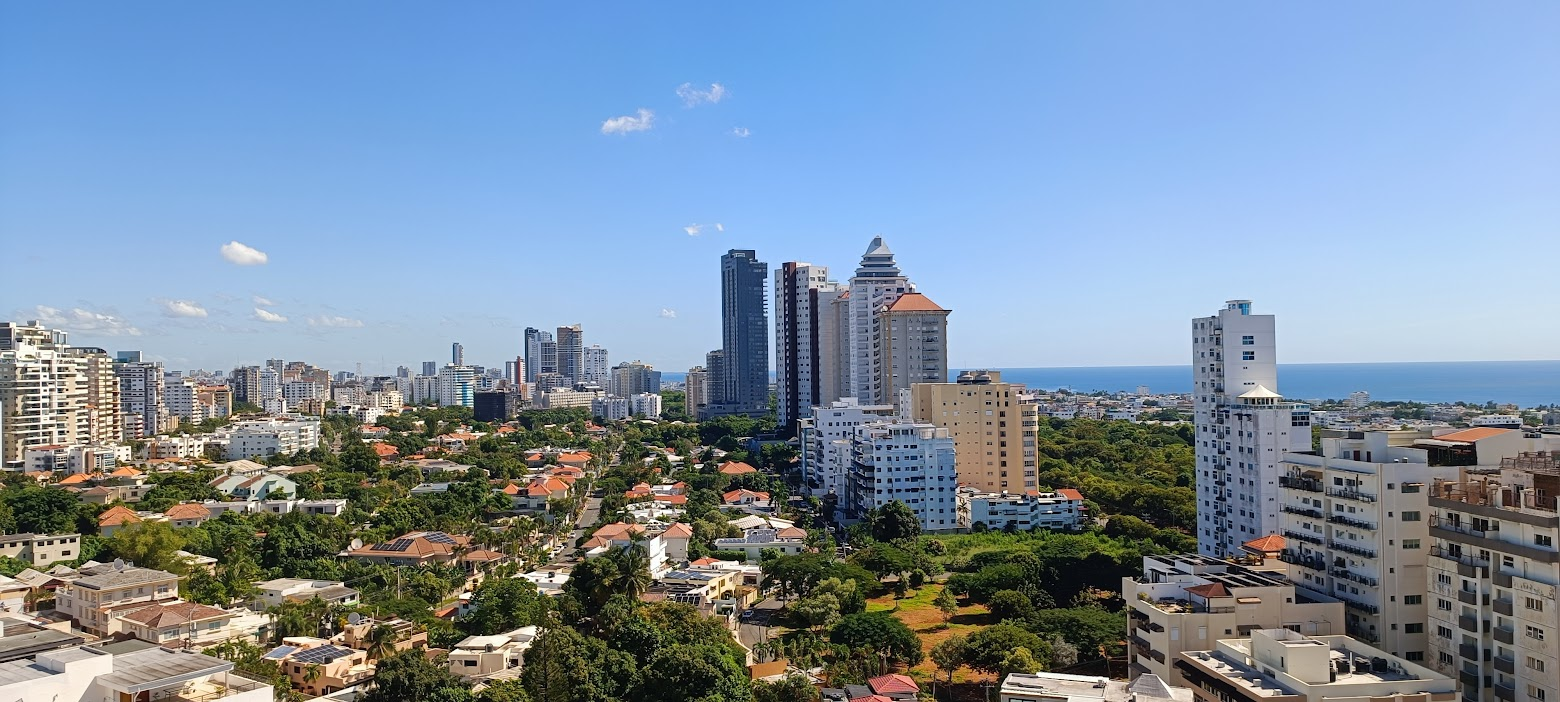
Panoramic view of Los Cacicazgos area, Santo Domingo

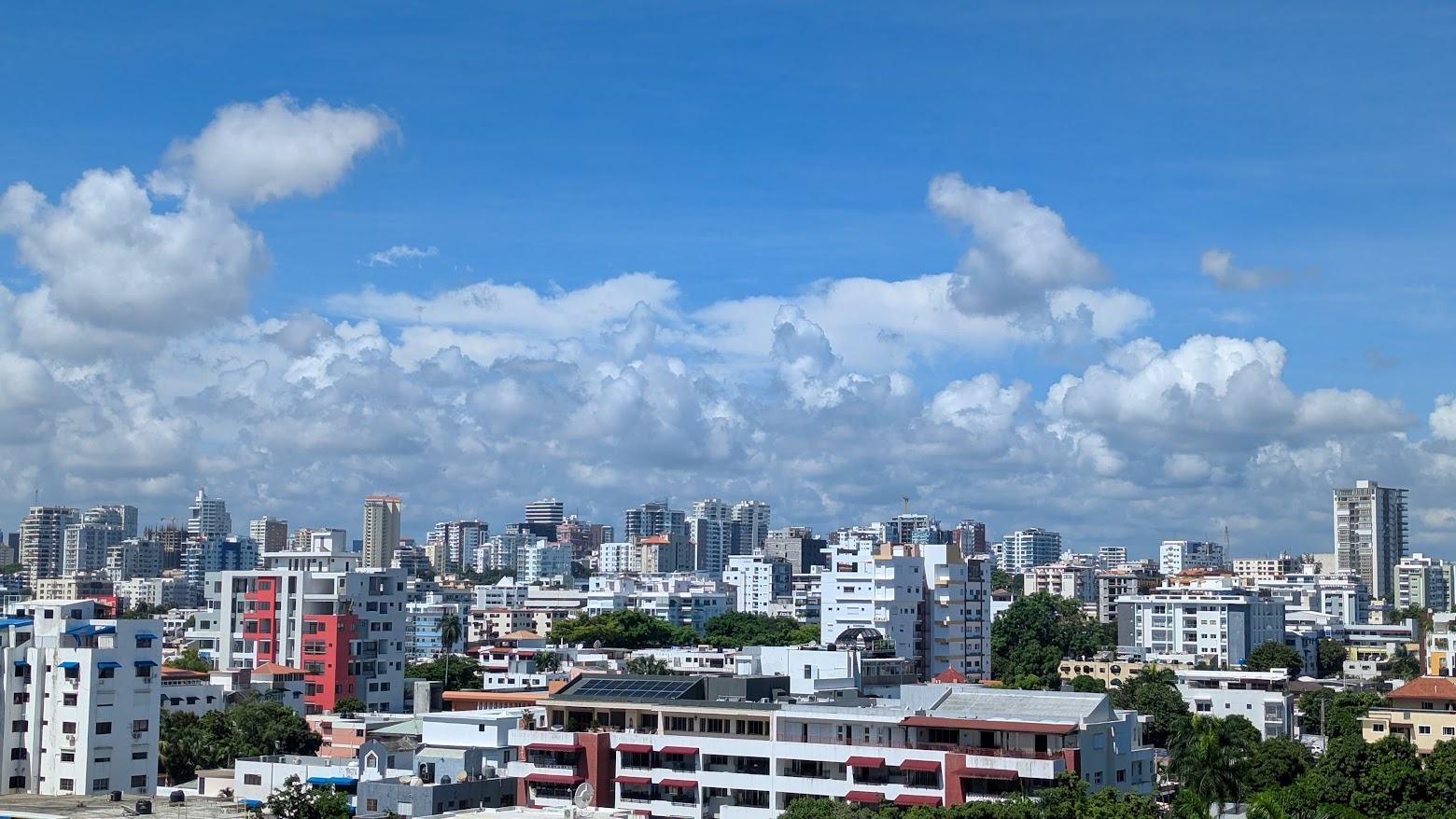
Urban View of Santo Domingo, Dominican Republic

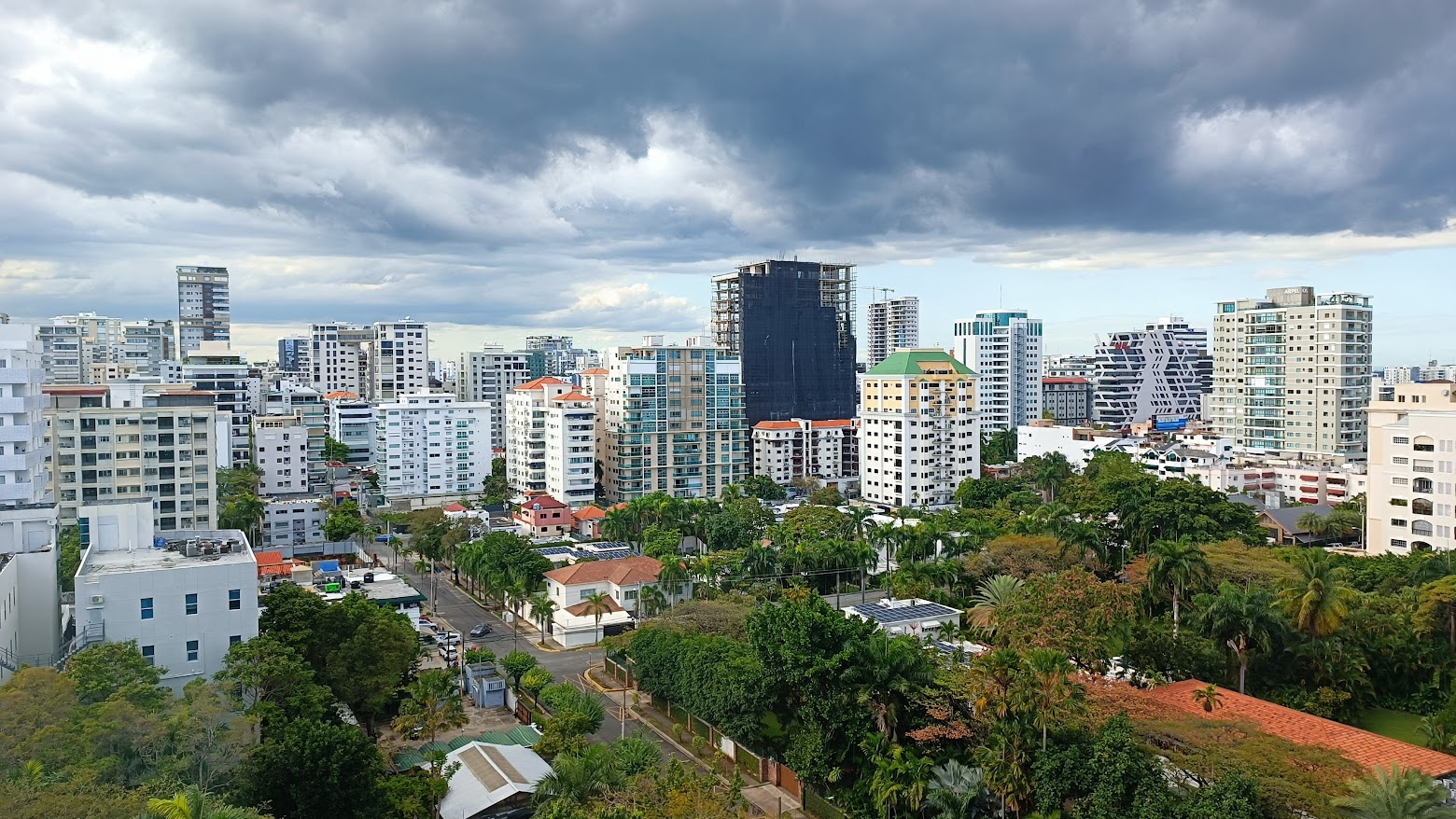
View of Piantini district in Santo Domingo, Dominican Republic

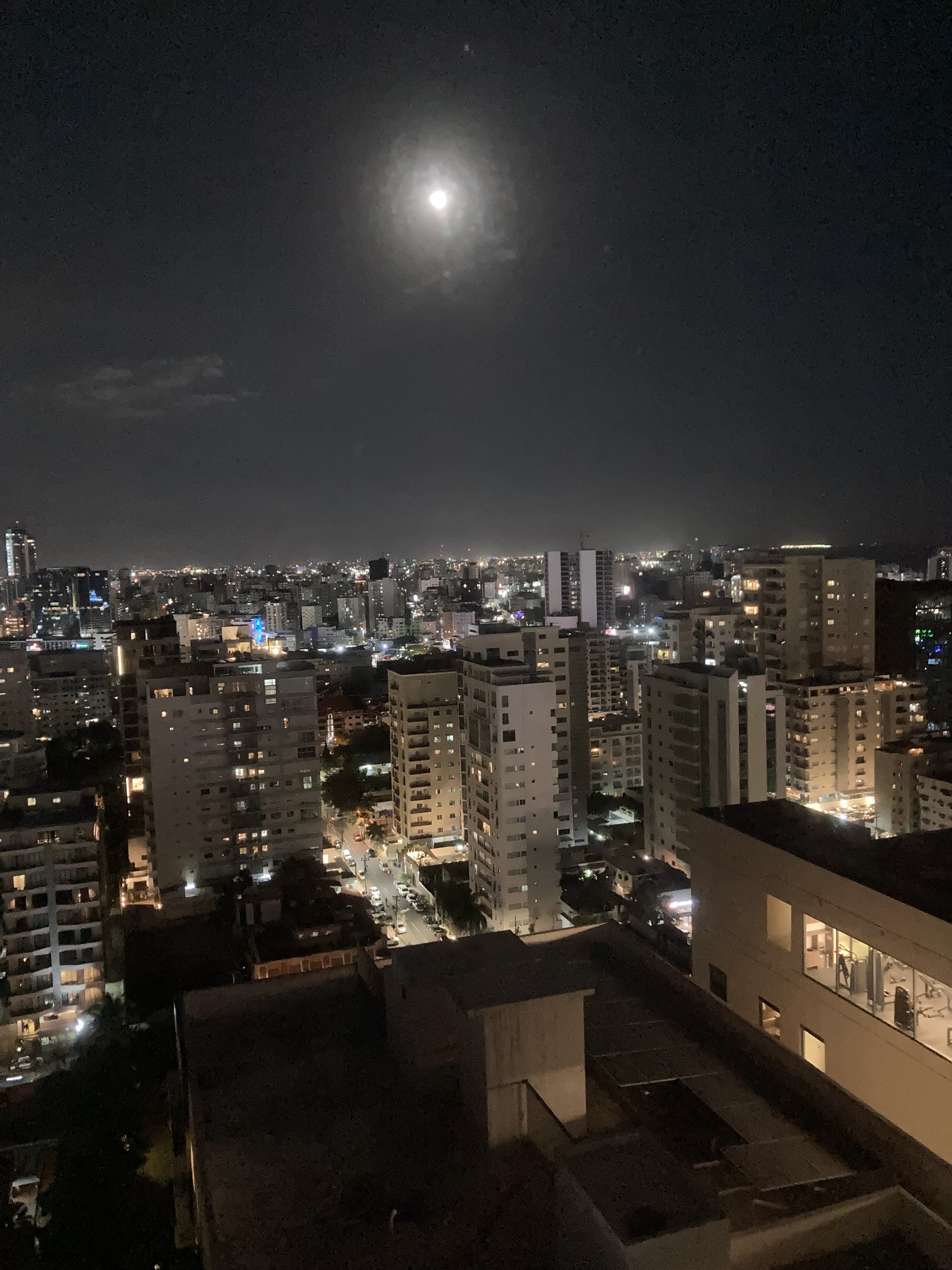
View of the city of Santo Domingo, by night.

=== Architecture ===
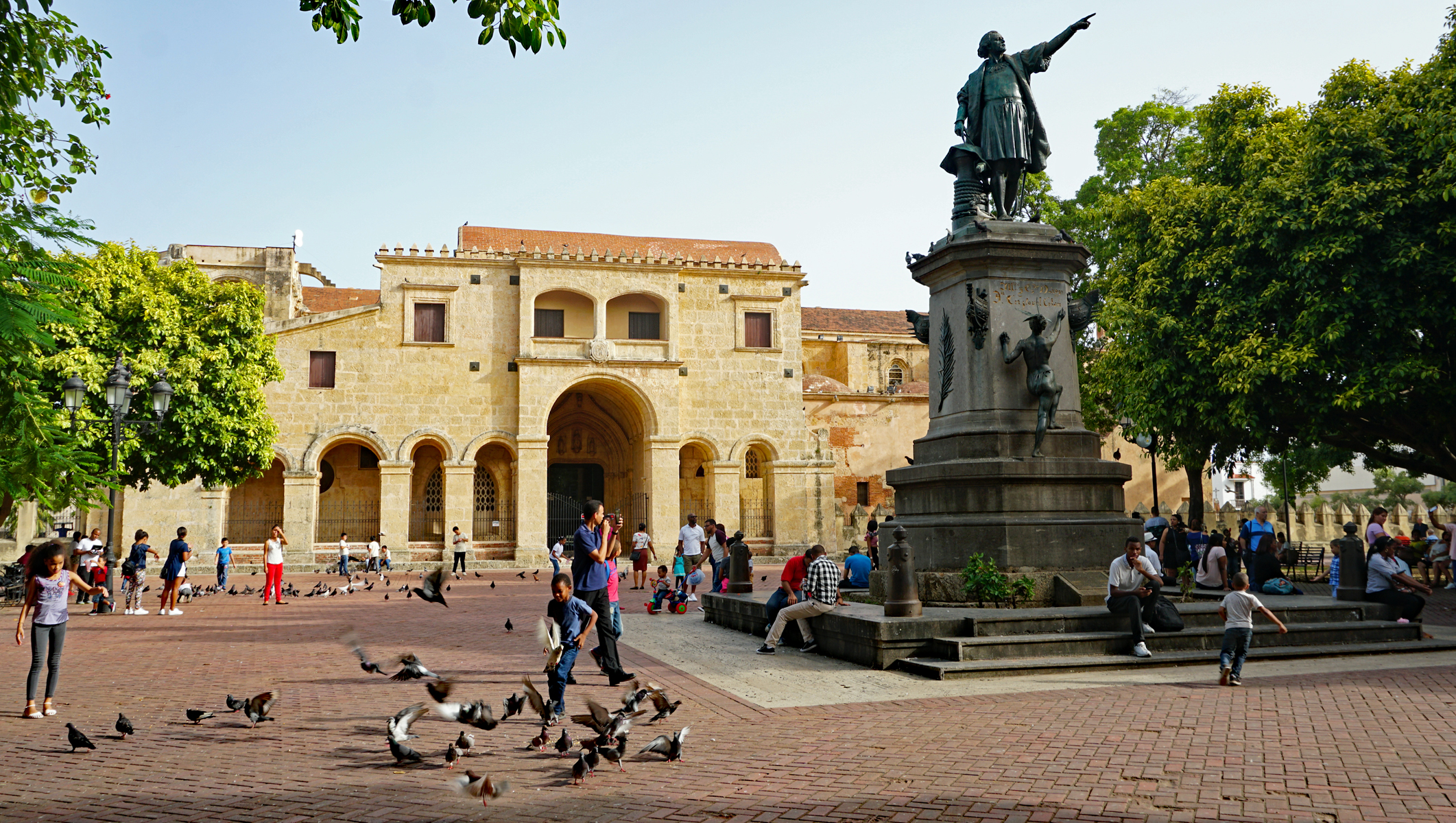
Parque Colón

Many of Santo Domingo's most notable landmarks are located within the Zona Colonial district of the city, a UNESCO World Heritage Site since 1990. The Colonial Zone, bordered by the Río Ozama, also has a collection of early 16th century buildings, including palatial houses and majestic churches that reflect the architectural style of the late Middle Ages. The Church and Convent of los Dominicos is the oldest Catholic building in continuous use in the Americas, and was the headquarters of the first university in the Americas.

The city's most important historical buildings include the Catedral Santa María La Menor, the first cathedral of the Americas, which states its distinction; the Alcázar de Colón, the first castle in the Americas, once the residence of Viceroy of the Indies Don Diego Colón, a son of Christopher Columbus; the Monasterio de San Francisco, the ruins of the first monastery in the Americas; the Museo de las Casas Reales, in a monumental complex that includes the former Palace of the Governors and the building of the former Royal Audiencia of Santo Domingo; the Fortaleza Ozama, is one of the surviving sections of the Walls of Santo Domingo, which is the oldest military construction of European origin in the Americas; the Pantéon Nacional, a former Jesuit edifice now hosting the remains of various renowned Dominicans; and the Dominican Convent, the first convent in the Americas.

On the north end of Calle Las Damas, the restored and expanded Plaza de España is bordered by Las Atarazanas (former naval yard, now a museum) and a number of small shops and restaurants. This area was the first European commercial center in the Americas, and is still a hub of activity today. The Alcázar de Colón, having once been the colonial palace of the Columbus family – beginning with his son Diego – is now a museum displaying period furniture and decorations. The building was originally built in 1510, and restored to its current appearance in 1952.

A 700 million US dollar investment was made in the Port of the Ozama river adjacent to the Ciudad Colonial aiming to turn Santo Domingo into a port of call for luxury cruise ships and including a privately owned marina. The project is being completed by Sans Soucí Ports S.A.

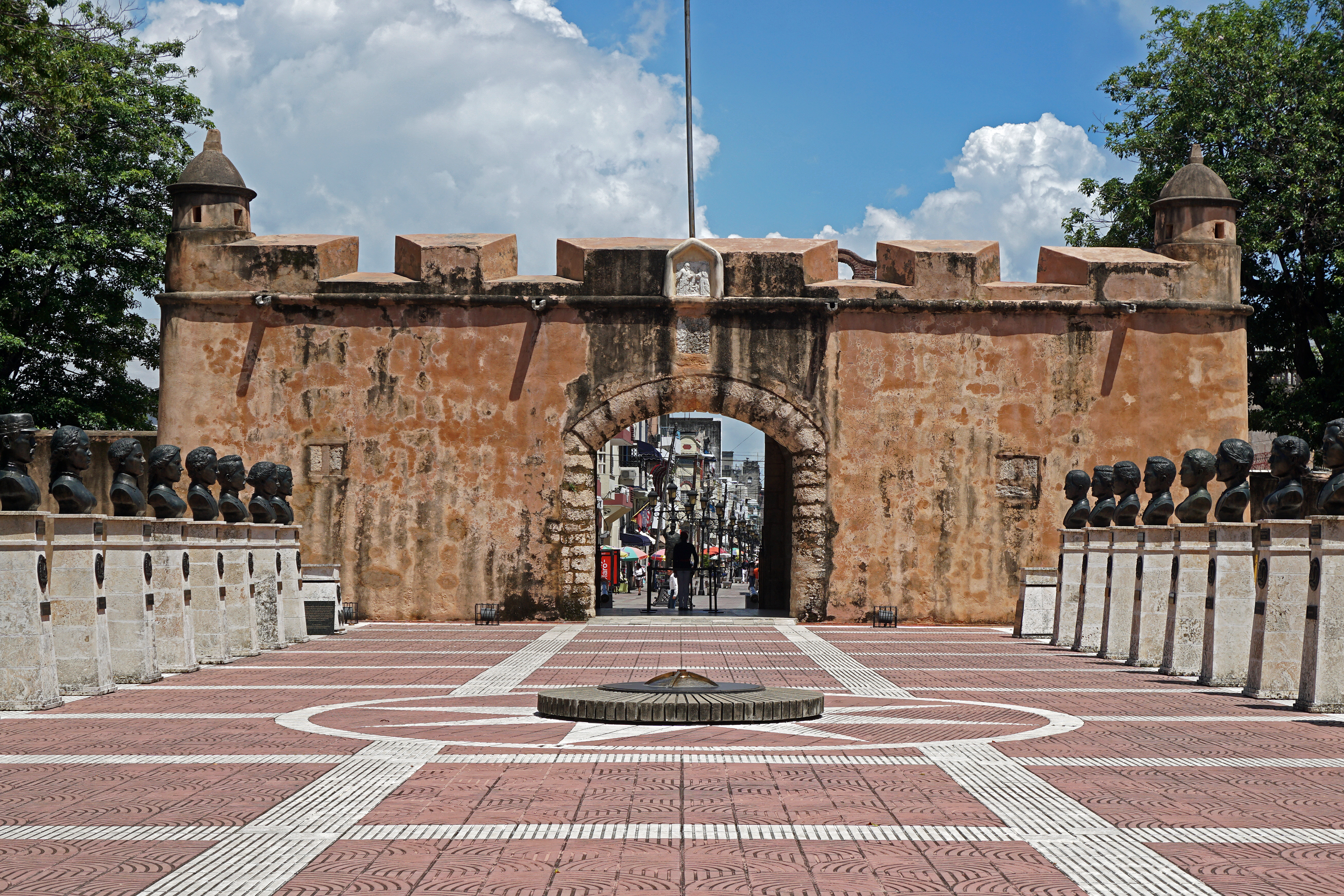
Puerta del Conde, built between 1543 and 1655, was the main entrance to the colonial fortified city of Santo Domingo

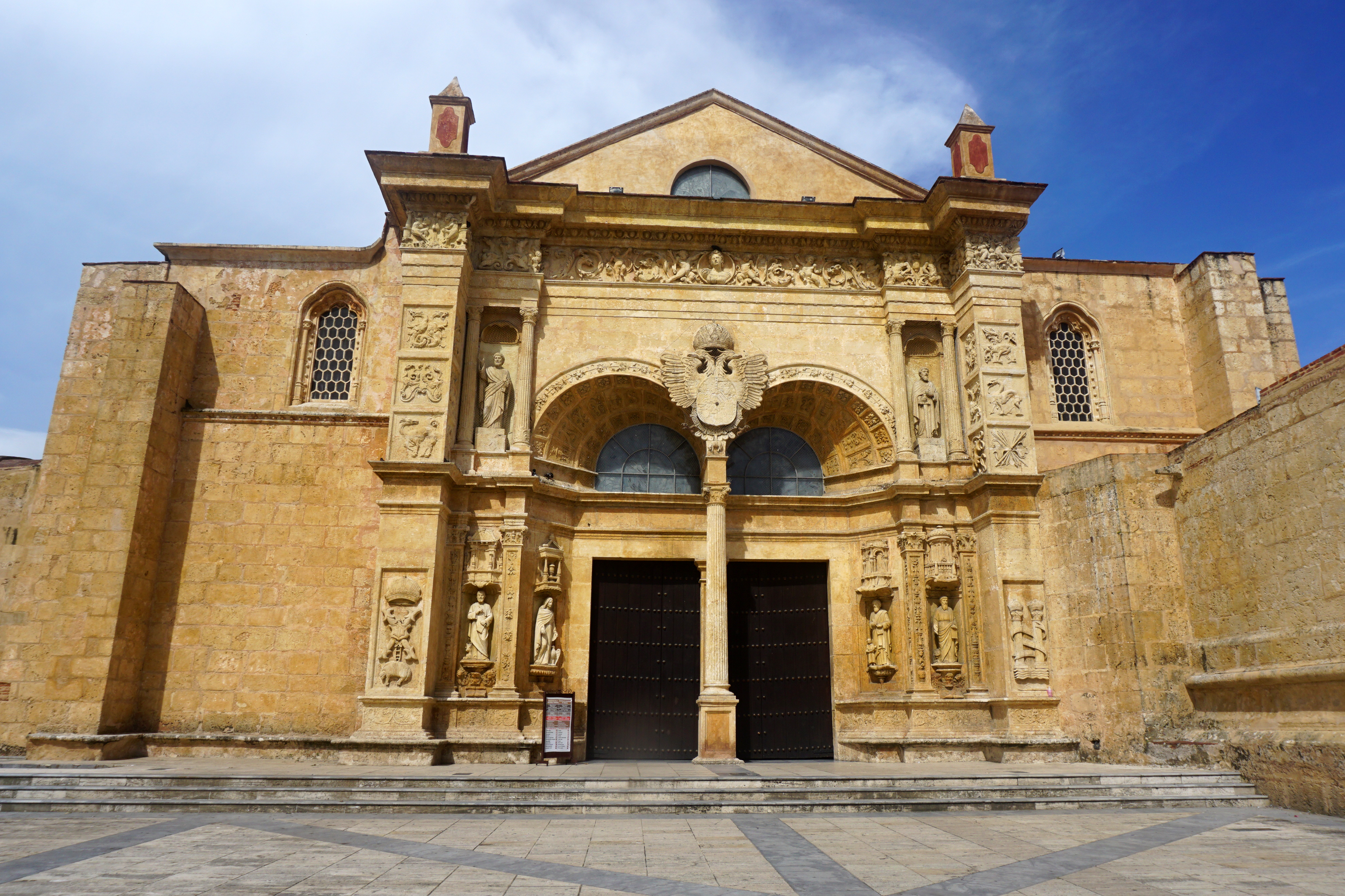
Gothic style Basilica Cathedral of Santa María la Menor, was the first cathedral built in the Americas

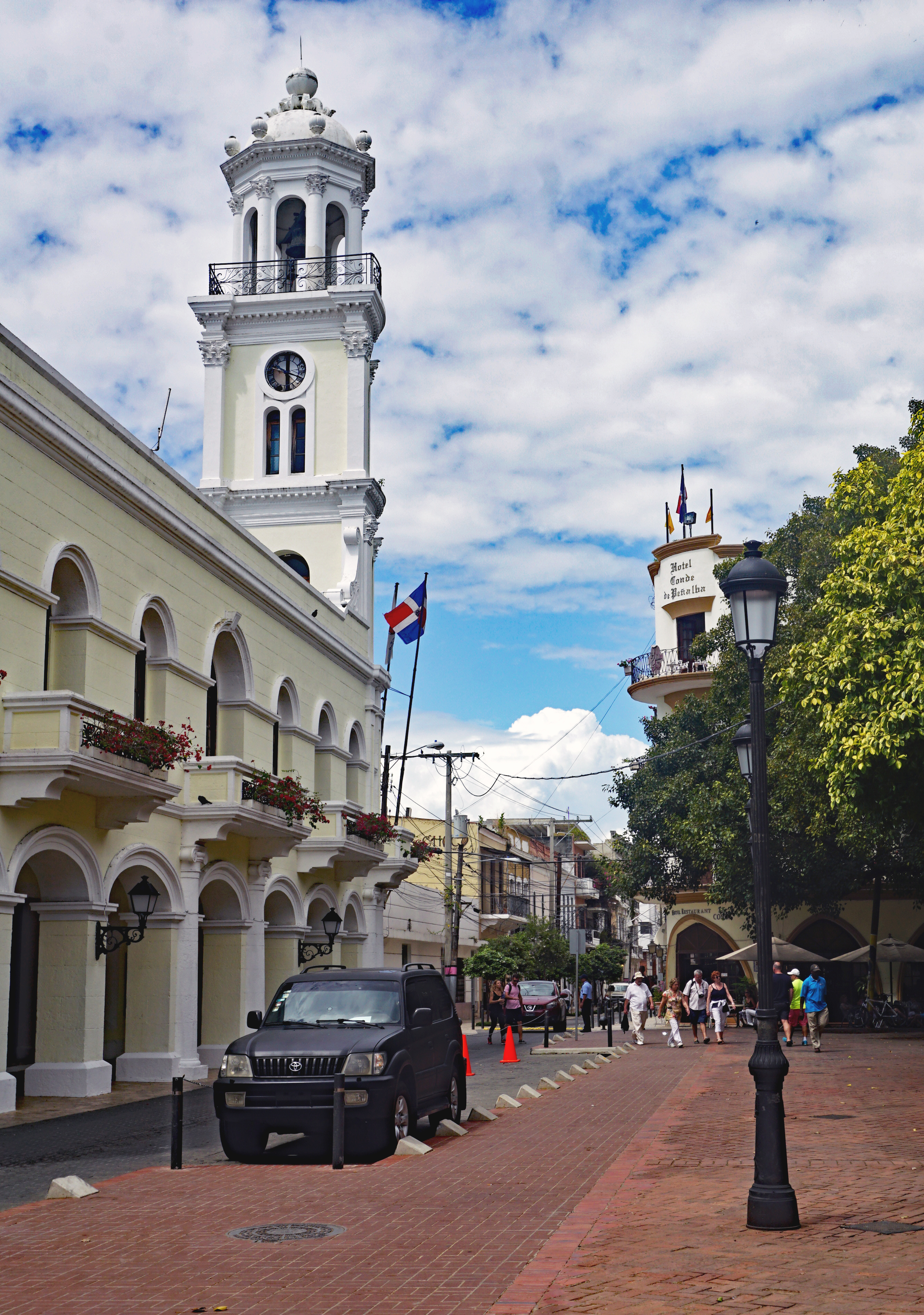
The City Hall of Santo Domingo, building built between 1504 and the early 19th century, but its tower was built in 1913

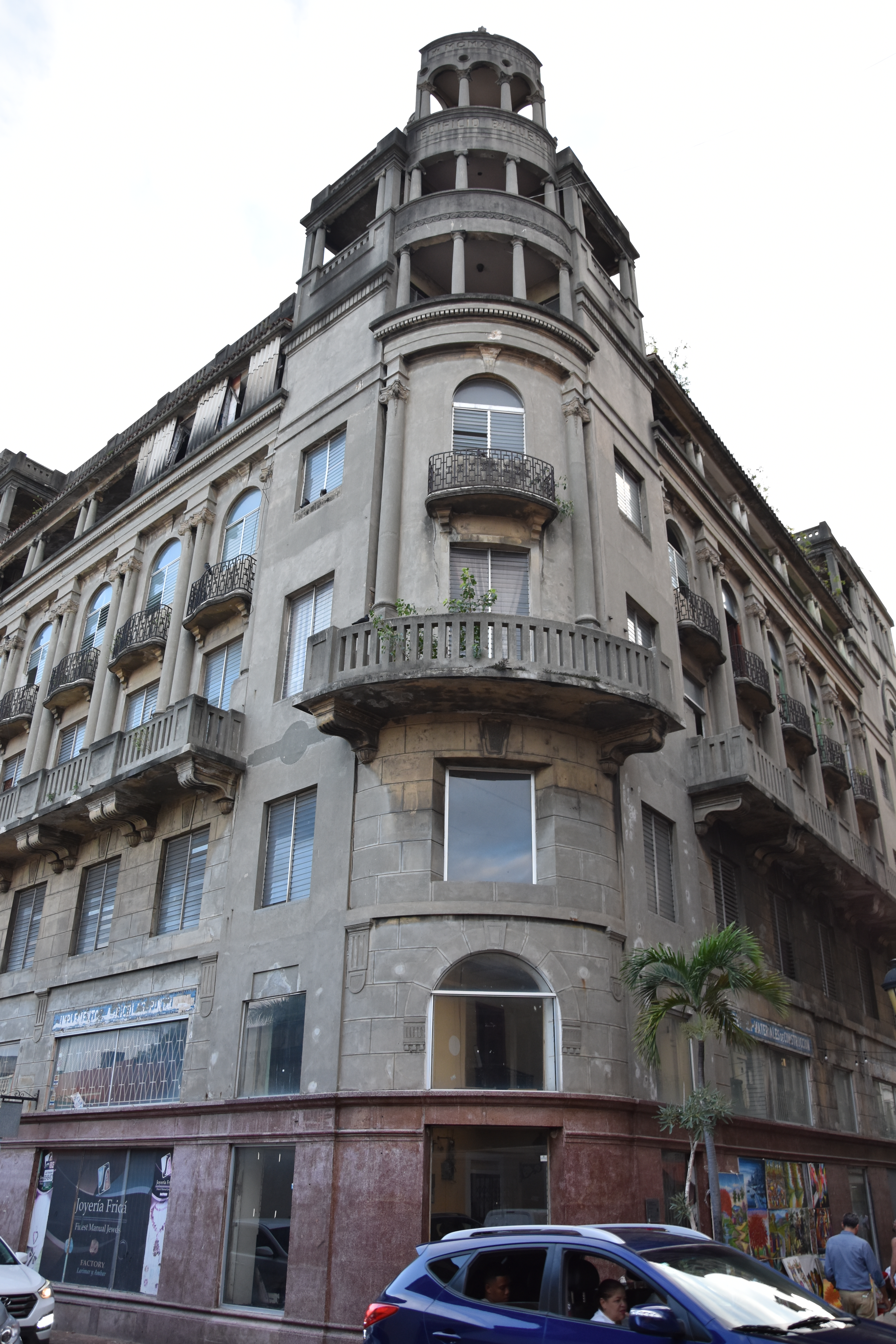
Edificio Baquero

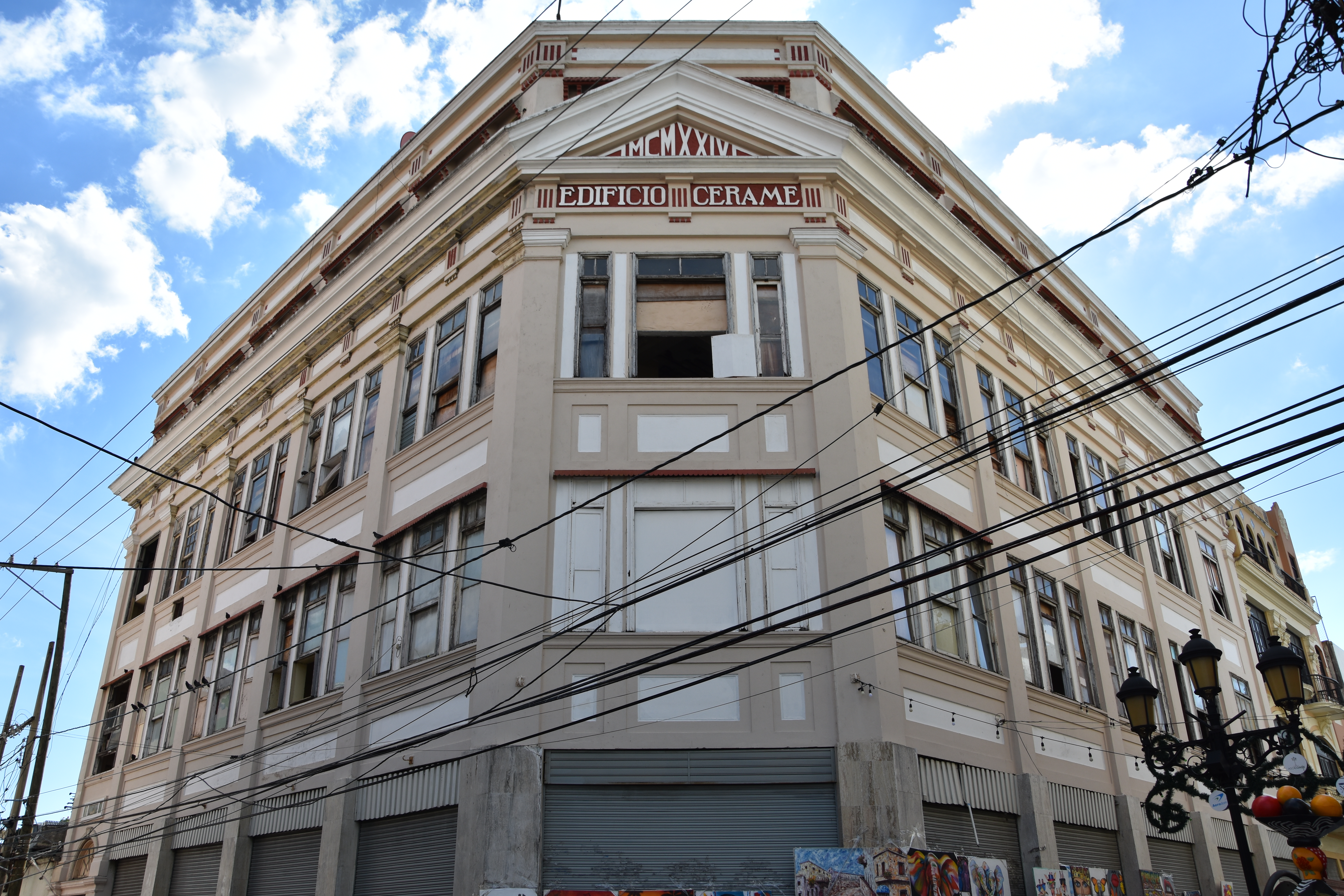
Edificio Cerame

=== Neighborhoods ===
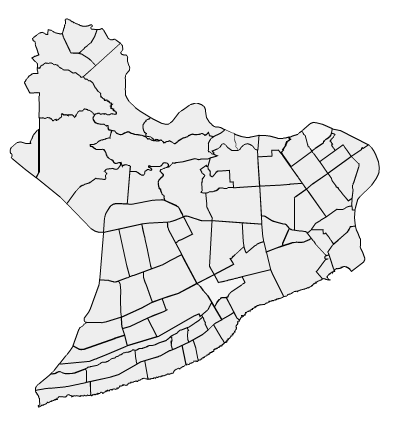
Neighborhoods of Santo Domingo

The city proper of Santo Domingo is subdivided into incorporated areas (neighborhoods) called sectores which could be considered as small urban towns. All sectores are serviced directly by the municipal mayor's office.

Sector regions:

- Ciudad (city) – applies to the original older parts of town, many of which date back to the colonial times.
- Ensanche (lit. 'widening') – usually, but not always, applied to the more "modern" parts of the city.
- Villa (village) – the urban outskirts of both the old city of Santo Domingo and the current (smaller) National District; originally they were separate villages, hence their names.

== Government and politics ==
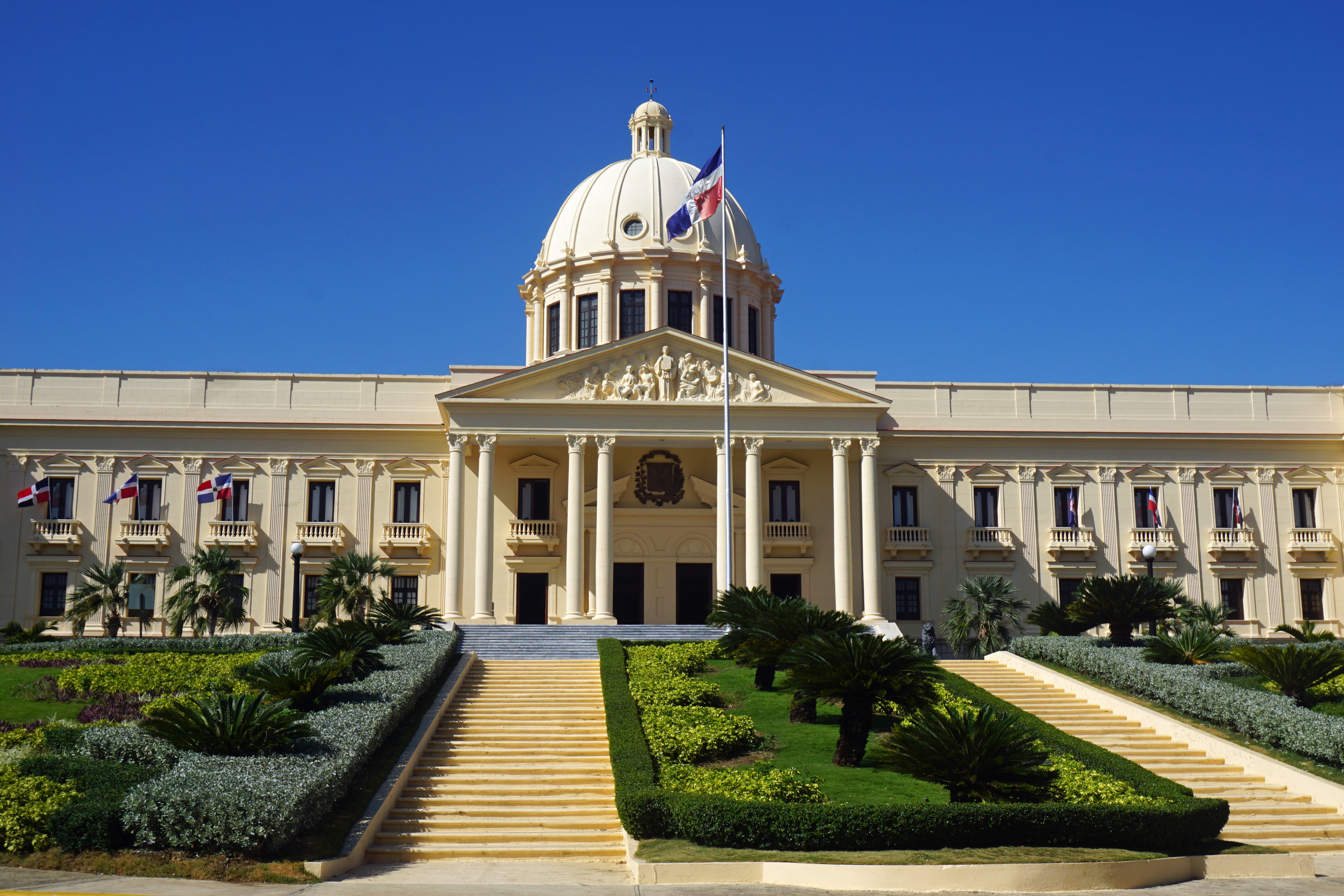
The National Palace, in Santo Domingo

Santo Domingo is the center of the national government of the Dominican Republic. The President's office and ministries, National Congress, Supreme Court of Justice, and other main government institutions are located in the metropolitan area.

The city is administered by the Ayuntamiento del Distrito Nacional (City Hall), which is responsible for municipal functions. The current mayor of Santo Domingo is Carolina Mejía de Garrigó.

The Policía Nacional (National Police) and Policia Turística (Tourist Police) (POLITUR) are tasked with enforcing city safety.

== Economy ==
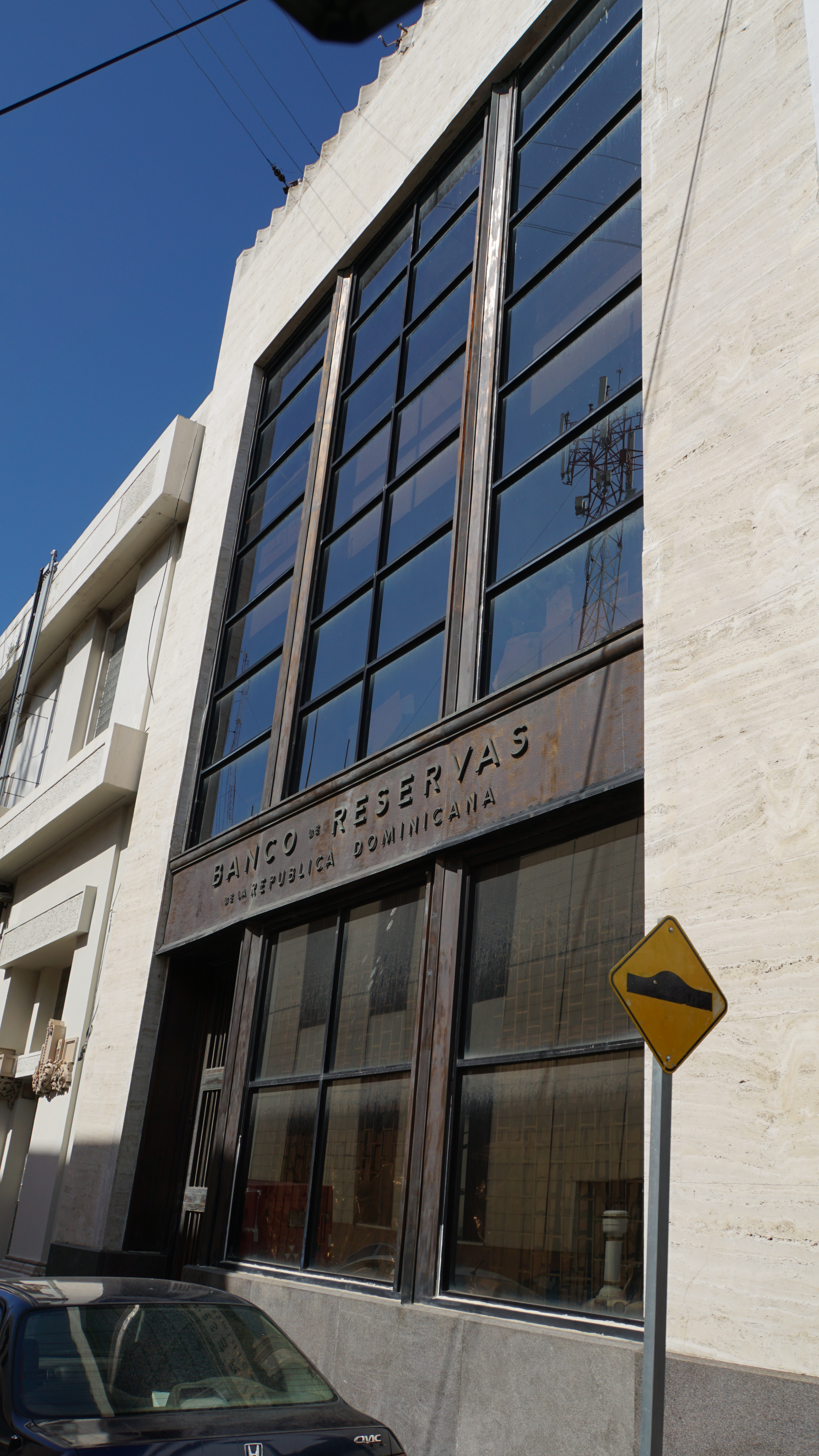
BanReservas (Reserve Bank of the Dominican Republic) in Santo Domingo

The city is the center of economic activity in the Dominican Republic. It is where most of the country's wealth is concentrated and the seat of the national legislature, judicial, and executive government. Many national and international firms have their headquarters or regional offices in Santo Domingo. The city attracts many international firms and franchises, such as Ikea, Goldcorp and Barrick due to its location and economic stability.

The infrastructure is suitable for most business operations. A key element that has helped the city grow and compete globally is the telecommunications infrastructure. Santo Domingo and the Dominican Republic as a whole enjoy a modern and extensive telecommunications system liberalized in the late 1990s which has benefited from extensive foreign investment. This has attracted numerous call centers in recent years. Santo Domingo not only has an excellent telecommunications infrastructure but also a sizeable bilingual population that speaks English.

The city's economic growth can be witnessed in the extensive vertical growth experienced across many of its neighborhoods. The construction boom is reflected in the many high density residential towers, shopping malls, elevated highways, the metro expansion and overall increase in commercial activity.

Santo Domingo has a thriving middle class contrasting with the significant pockets of poverty that remain as challenges for the future. Marginalized slum conditions exist mostly in the northeast quadrant of the city with smaller pockets extending across the city. Areas of extensive development include the Poligono Central, which is bordered by the Avenida John F. Kennedy northward 27 February Avenue south, Avenida Winston Churchill to the west and Avenida Máximo Gómez to the east, and is characterized by its mixed development and its very active nightlife.

Santo Domingo has areas of high development, among them Serralles, Naco, Arroyo Hondo, Piantini, Urb Fernandez, Ens. Julieta, Paraiso, Los Prados, Bella Vista, Sarasota and other sectors, where most of the middle class can be found.

Bella Vista and La Esperilla are currently the fastest growing sectors with large mega -projects. Gazcue belongs to the more traditional southeastern area of the city and is known for its buildings dating from the 1930s to the 1960s.

== Culture ==
The performing arts are very important in Santo Domingo. The city has its own symphonic orchestra, chamber orchestra, opera company, ballet company, folkloric company, and national theater, including a number of smaller groups. The Plaza of culture is the center of activity, but there are concerts, ballet, folklore, and other performances throughout the city. Casa de Teatro is the gathering place of avant garde artists, actors, and musicians. It stages art and literature exhibitions and offers painting, drama, and dancing courses and monthly contests for poetry, short stories, and other forms of literature.

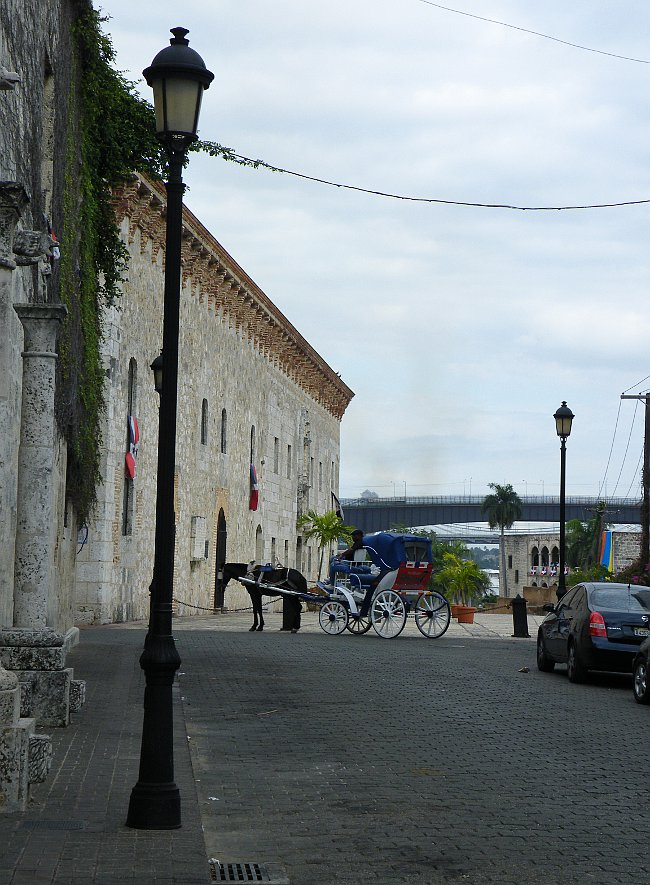
The Palace of the Real Audiencia of Santo Domingo was the first (oldest) headquarters of Spanish power in the New World. Now houses the Museo de las Casas Reales

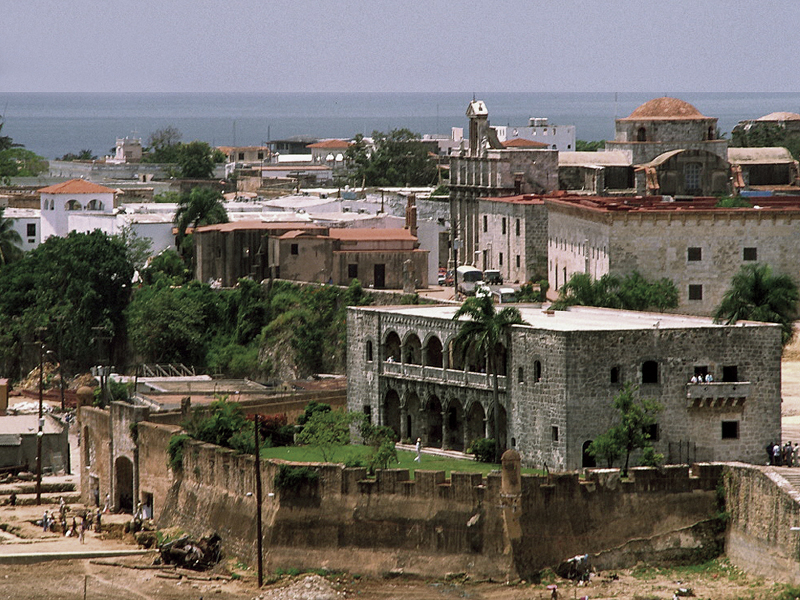
Alcázar de Colón is the only known residence of a member of Christopher Columbus' family: his first son Diego Columbus.

Santo Domingo is the location of numerous museums, many of which are located in the Zona Colonial district. In the Zona Colonial is the Museum of Alcázar, in Diego Colon's palace, the Museum of the Casas Reales, with artefacts of the colonial period and a collection of ancient weapons donated by Trujillo, the Naval Museum of the Atarazanas, in the former naval yards, Museo de la Catedral, Museo Memorial de la Resistencia Dominicana, documenting the struggle for freedom during the regimes of Trujillo and Balaguer, Museo Duarte, dedicated to the hero of Dominican independence, and the World of Ambar Museum.

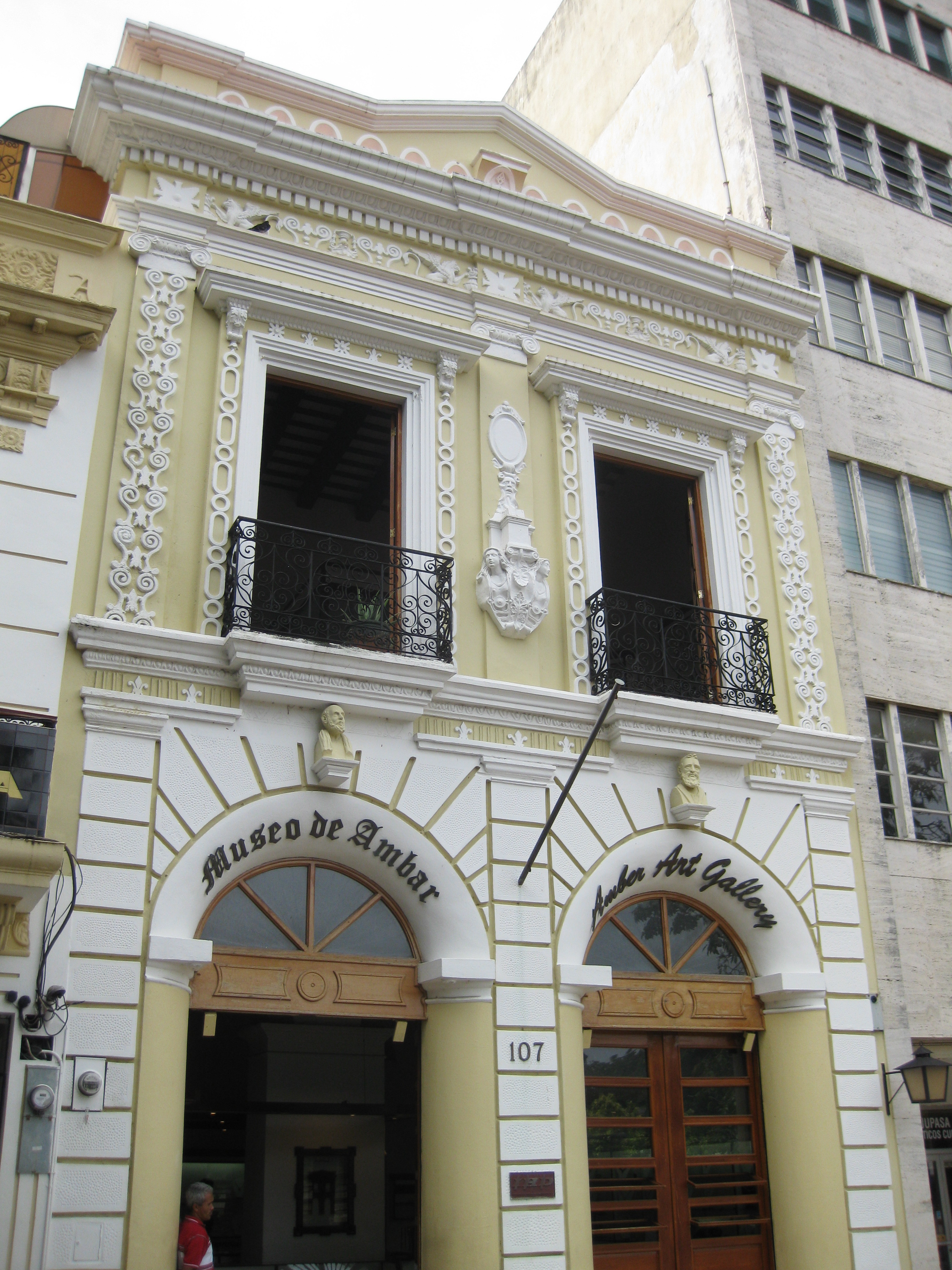
Museo del Ámbar

Plaza de la Cultura also houses the city's most important cultural venues, including the Teatro Nacional (National Theater) and various museums; the Palacio Nacional, which houses the Presidency of the Dominican Republic; the Palacio de Bellas Artes (Palace of Fine Arts), a neoclassical building that is the permanent home of the country's National Symphony Orchestra; and the Boulevard 27 de Febrero, a pedestrian promenade located on the busy Avenida 27 de Febrero, which displays works of art from prominent Dominican artists and sculptors. Another attraction is the Centro Olímpico Juan Pablo Duarte, a sports complex in the center of Santo Domingo. This complex was used during the 2003 Pan American Games.

In the Plaza de la Cultura are the Museum of the Dominican Man, with artifacts from the pre-Columbian Taíno civilization, the National Museum of History and Geography, the Museum of Natural History and the Museum of Modern Art. Other museums include the Museo Bellapart, a prominent private collection of 19th- and 20th-Century Dominican painting and sculpture and the Museo Prehispanico, a major private collection of pre-Columbian Taíno art.

== Media and communications ==
Telecommunications in the Dominican Republic include radio, television, fixed and mobile telephones, and the Internet. There are 59 television stations in Santo Domingo. Santo Domingo has the greatest number of television signals in the country. Additional cable television channels are provided by companies like Aster, Cable TV Dominicana, SKY Dominicana, and Telecable. In Santo Domingo there are 100 different stations in AM frequency and 44 in FM frequency.

== Parks and recreational areas ==
The city has various parks, many of which are relatively large. Santo Domingo (D.N) is surrounded by the Santo Domingo Greenbelt. Mirador Norte Park lies in the north of the city, close to Villa Mella and Mirador Sur Park is located in the southwest section of the city. Mirador del Este is located on the East bank of the Ozama river and it is the seat of the Columbus Lighthouse. Independencia Park and Colón Park are located in Zona Colonial. Zoo Parque Zoológico Nacional is home to a range of 82–100 both exotic and native plants and animal species.

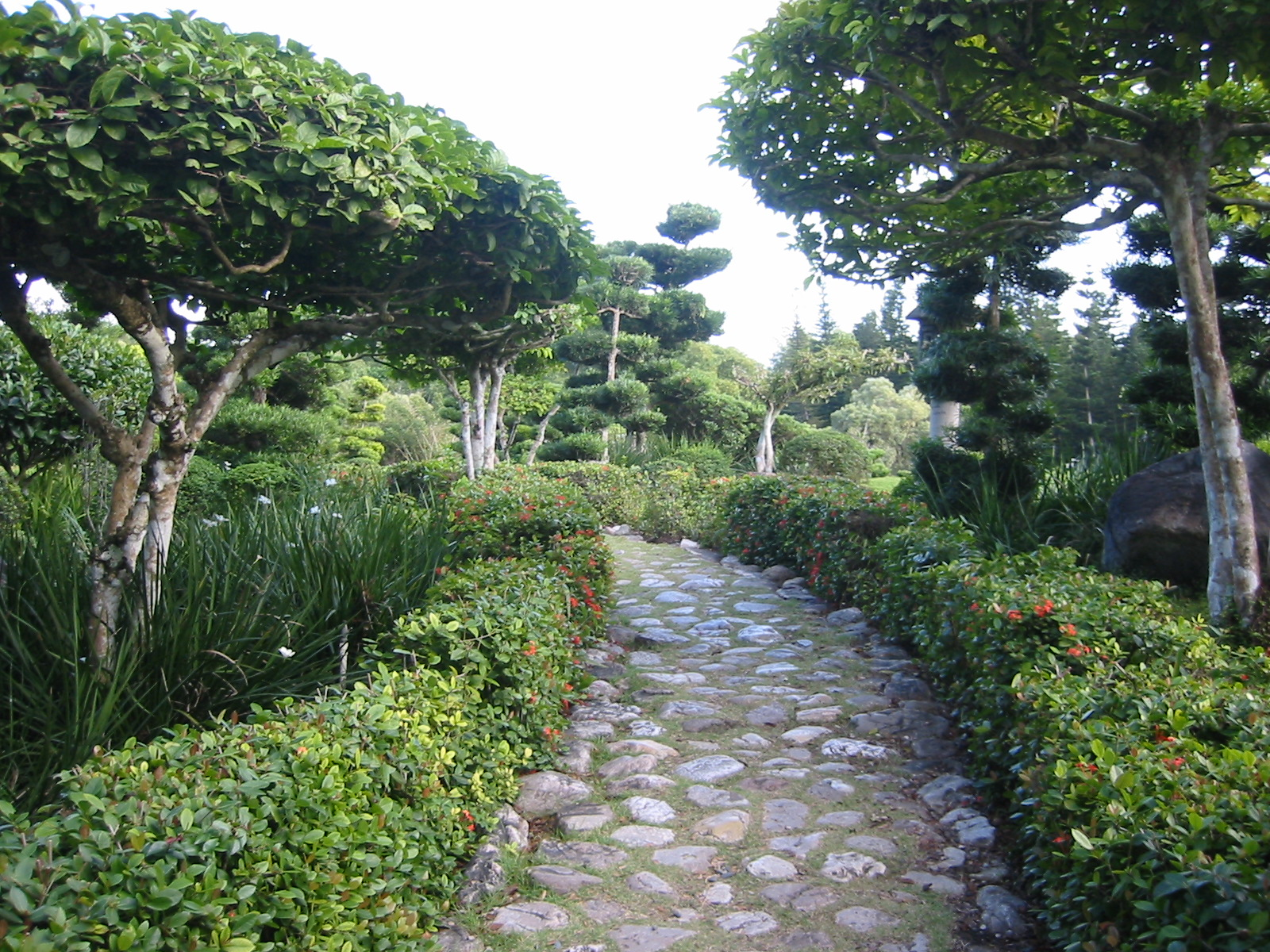
National Botanical Garden

Other notable parks include:

- Parque Enriquillo
- Parque Independencia
- Parque Metropolitano Las Praderas
- El Malecón
- Jardín Botánico Nacional
- Parque Zoológico Nacional
- Barrio Chino de Santo Domingo
- Parque Núñez de Cáceres
- Parque Iberoamérica
- Mirador Sur

== Education ==
There are eighteen universities in Santo Domingo, the highest number of any city in the Dominican Republic. Established in 1538, the Universidad Autónoma de Santo Domingo (UASD) is the oldest university in the Americas and is also the only public university in the city. Santo Domingo holds the nation's highest percentage of residents with a higher education degree.

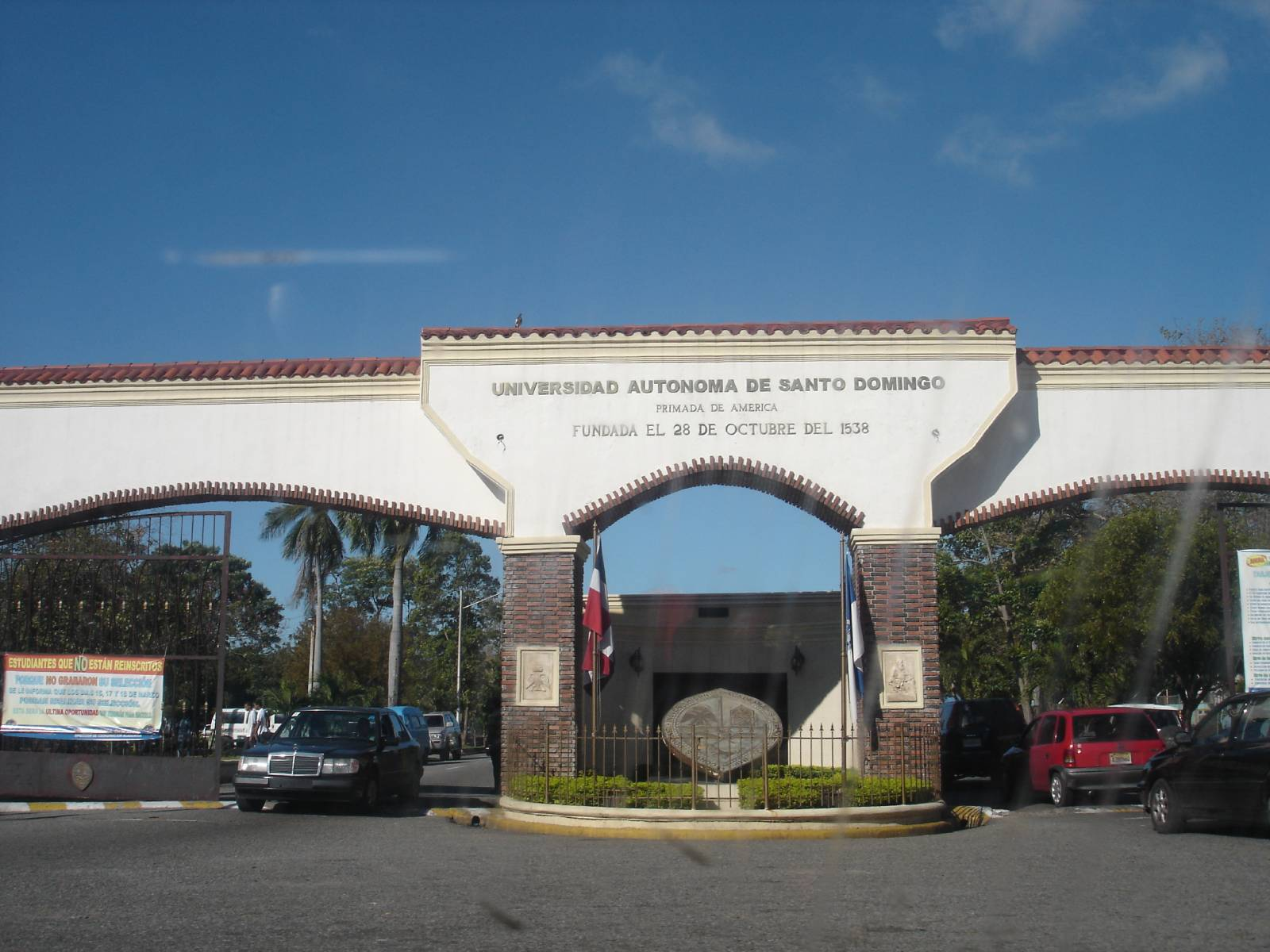
Entrance of the Autonomous University of Santo Domingo (UASD)

Other universities include:

- Universidad Adventista Dominicana (UNAD)
- Universidad APEC (UNAPEC)
- Instituto Tecnológico de Santo Domingo (INTEC)
- Universidad del Caribe (UNICARIBE)
- Universidad Iberoamericana (UNIBE) (UNIBE)
- Universidad Católica Santo Domingo (UCSD)
- Universidad de la Tercera Edad (UTE)
- Universidad Tecnológica de Santiago (UTESA)
- Universidad Nacional Pedro Henríquez Ureña (UNPHU)
- Instituto de Ciencias Exactas (INCE)
- Universidad Organización y Método (O&M)
- Universidad Interamericana (UNICA)
- Universidad Eugenio María de Hostos (UNIREMOS)
- Universidad Francisco Henríquez y Carvajal (UFHEC)
- Universidad Instituto Cultural Domínico Americano (UNICDA)
- Pontificia Universidad Católica Madre y Maestra (PUCMM)
- Universidad de Psicologia Industrial Dominicana (UPID)

== Transportation ==
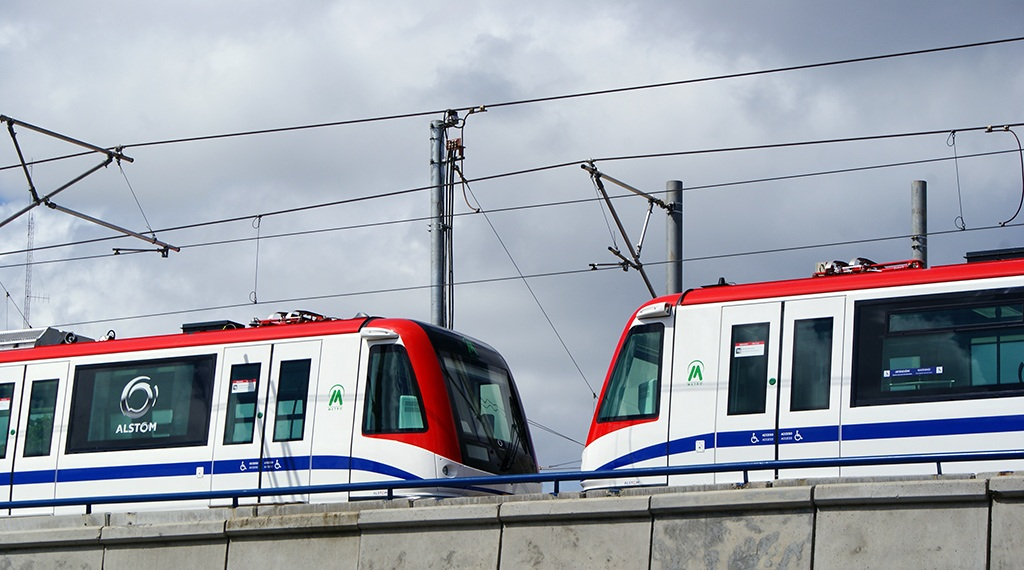
Santo Domingo Metro

=== Metro ===
Santo Domingo has an underground and elevated rapid transit metro system. As of April 2026 the system consists of 35 kilometers and 29 stations, making it the most extensive metro in the Caribbean and Central American region by total length and number of stations. The Santo Domingo Metro is part of a major "National Master Plan" to improve transportation in the city as well as the rest of the nation. The first line was planned to relieve traffic congestion in the Máximo Gómez and Hermanas Mirabal Avenue. The second line, which opened in April 2013, is meant to relieve the congestion along the Duarte-Kennedy-Centenario Corridor in the city from west to east. As of August 2013, the metro consists of these two lines. Four more lines are planned to be constructed in the near future, for a total of six. According to government figures about 400,000 people ride the system each working day.

=== Cable car ===
In 2018, a 5-kilometer Teleférico de Santo Domingo (aerial cable car) was opened to provide service low income areas like Sabana Perdida in the east and north of the metropolitan area, and serve as a feeder for the metro. This cable car line is used by more than 12,000 people daily. In 2023 a second 5-kilometer cable car line opened to connect the neighboring municipality of Los Alcarrizos with the Santo Domingo Metro at Duarte Highway. The second line is used by over 10,000 people daily. As of May 2026 the cost of riding cable car system is 20 Dominican pesos for the first line (US$0.25) and 35 Dominican pesos (US$0.59) for the second line, unlimited free transfers from the teleféricos lines to the metro are allowed. There is currently a third 7.8-kilometer cable car line under construction to connect the Herrera neighbhorhood to the metro system which is set to open in 2027.

=== OMSA bus ===
The state-owned Oficina Metropolitana de Servicios de Autobuses (OMSA) operates 22 bus routes across much of the Greater Santo Domingo area, primarily serving major avenues such as Avenida 27 de Febrero, Avenida Luperón, Avenida Máximo Gómez, Avenida John F. Kennedy, and Avenida Abraham Lincoln. Fares range from 15 to 35 Dominican pesos (approximately US$0.25 to US$0.59), depending on the specific route and payment method. Some routes accept cash only, while others operate exclusively with electronic payments through the integrated transportation card used by the Santo Domingo Metro and cable car systems, as well as credit cards, debit cards, Google Pay, and Apple Pay. Certain routes allow a combination of payment methods and are fare-integrated with the metro and cable car networks. OMSA operates daily from 6:00 a.m. to 10:00 p.m. and transports an average of around 100,000 passengers on each weekday.

=== Privately operated bus corridors ===
In addition to OMSA bus services, Santo Domingo operates a network of privately managed bus corridors running along some of the city's principal thoroughfares. These corridors are administered by private transportation operators and consortiums under state regulation and are intended to modernize the traditional public transport system. Prominent routes operate on avenues such as Avenida Independencia, Avenida Núñez de Cáceres, Avenida Winston Churchill, and Avenida Charles de Gaulle. These services offer higher frequencies than the buses operated by Oficina Metropolitana de Servicios de Autobuses (OMSA). Fares cost RD$35 (approximately US$0.59) and are paid electronically through the integrated Metro smart card system, as well as by credit and debit cards, Google Pay, and Apple Pay. These corridors feature air-conditioned buses, designated stops, operational integration with the Santo Domingo Metro and Teleférico networks and run from 5:00 am to 11:00 pm.

=== Taxis and ridesharing services ===
Around 120 taxi companies operate in Santo Domingo. Taxi fares are generally not calculated using taximeters and instead must be agreed upon in advance between the driver and the passenger. Taxis may either be hailed directly from the street or requested through company dispatch services. In recent years, most taxi companies have also adopted WhatsApp-based booking systems that allow customers to request rides through text messages or voice notes. Ride-hailing applications are widely used across the city, particularly Uber, DiDi, and inDrive. The first two platforms also provide motorcycle taxi options, and users may generally pay either in cash or electronically with debit or credit cards.

=== Airports ===
Santo Domingo is served by two airports, the largest and most important of which is Las Américas International Airport, commonly known as AILA. Located east of the city, it is Santo Domingo's main international gateway, offering connections to destinations across North, Central, and South America, as well as Europe. The airport is also one of the hubs of Arajet, which connects Santo Domingo with much of Latin America and several major cities in the United States. In addition, Las Américas is the busiest cargo airport in the Caribbean and Central America, handling more than 355 million pounds of cargo in 2019.

The city's secondary airport is La Isabela International Airport, located in the northern section of the city, only a few kilometers from the city center. Built in the early 21st century, the airport serves international destinations across the Caribbean region in addition to charter flights.

=== Ports ===
The Port of Santo Domingo is located on the Ozama River. Its location at the center of the Caribbean is well suited for flexible itinerary planning and has excellent support, road and airport infrastructure within the Santo Domingo region, which facilitate access and transfers. The port is suitable for both turnaround and transit calls.

The port's renovation is part of a major redevelopment project, aimed at integrating the port area and the Zona Colonial and foster a cruise, yacht, and high-end tourism destination. Supported by legislation approved in 2005, the project, developed by the Sans Souci Group, also includes the development of a new sports marina and a 122-acre (0.49 km^{2}) mixed-leisure real estate development adjacent to the port.

=== Intercity transportation ===
Santo Domingo is the main hub for intercity bus transportation in the Dominican Republic, with dozens of private companies operating frequent services to cities and towns across the country. Most long-distance routes depart from dedicated terminals located throughout the capital rather than from a single central station. Among the most important terminals are those of Caribe Tours, which serves much of the northern and southwestern regions of the country, Expreso Bávaro for routes to Punta Cana and the eastern region, Transporte Espinal for services to Santiago de los Caballeros, and Expreso Vegano for routes to La Vega and other cities in the North. Major operators also provide connections to destinations such as Puerto Plata, La Romana, Higüey, Las Terrenas, Samaná, Barahona, and San Francisco de Macorís. Services range from standard minibuses to modern air-conditioned coaches equipped with reclining seats, Wi-Fi, television screens, and onboard luggage compartments. Departures on the busiest routes often occur every few minutes throughout the day, particularly to Santiago and other major urban centers. Tickets are usually purchased directly at company terminals before departure.

=== Highways ===
Santo Domingo is the terminus of four of the five national highways. The city is connected to the southwest of the country by the national highway DR-2 (Autopista 30 de Mayo and Autopista Sánchez), and with the cities of the country's northwest by DR-1 (Expreso Kennedy, Corredor Autopista Duarte), which serves as a direct link to the city of Santiago de los Caballeros. DR-3 (Autopista de Las Américas) connects Santo Domingo directly to the east of the country, including the cities of San Pedro de Macorís, La Romana, and major tourist sites such as Punta Cana and Bávaro, and to the Samaná Province (in the northeast) via the Samana Highway. In the city, motoconchos (motorcycle taxis), guaguas/voladoras (low quality public buses), and carros públicos/conchos (shared taxis) are also common modes of transport.

=== Main avenues ===
Expreso John F. Kennedy: This expressway crosses the National District from east to west in the north-central part. The Avenue consists of a total of ten lanes, five on each side. The two center lanes of the road are express lanes to facilitate transit. It also has several bypasses and elevated crossings.

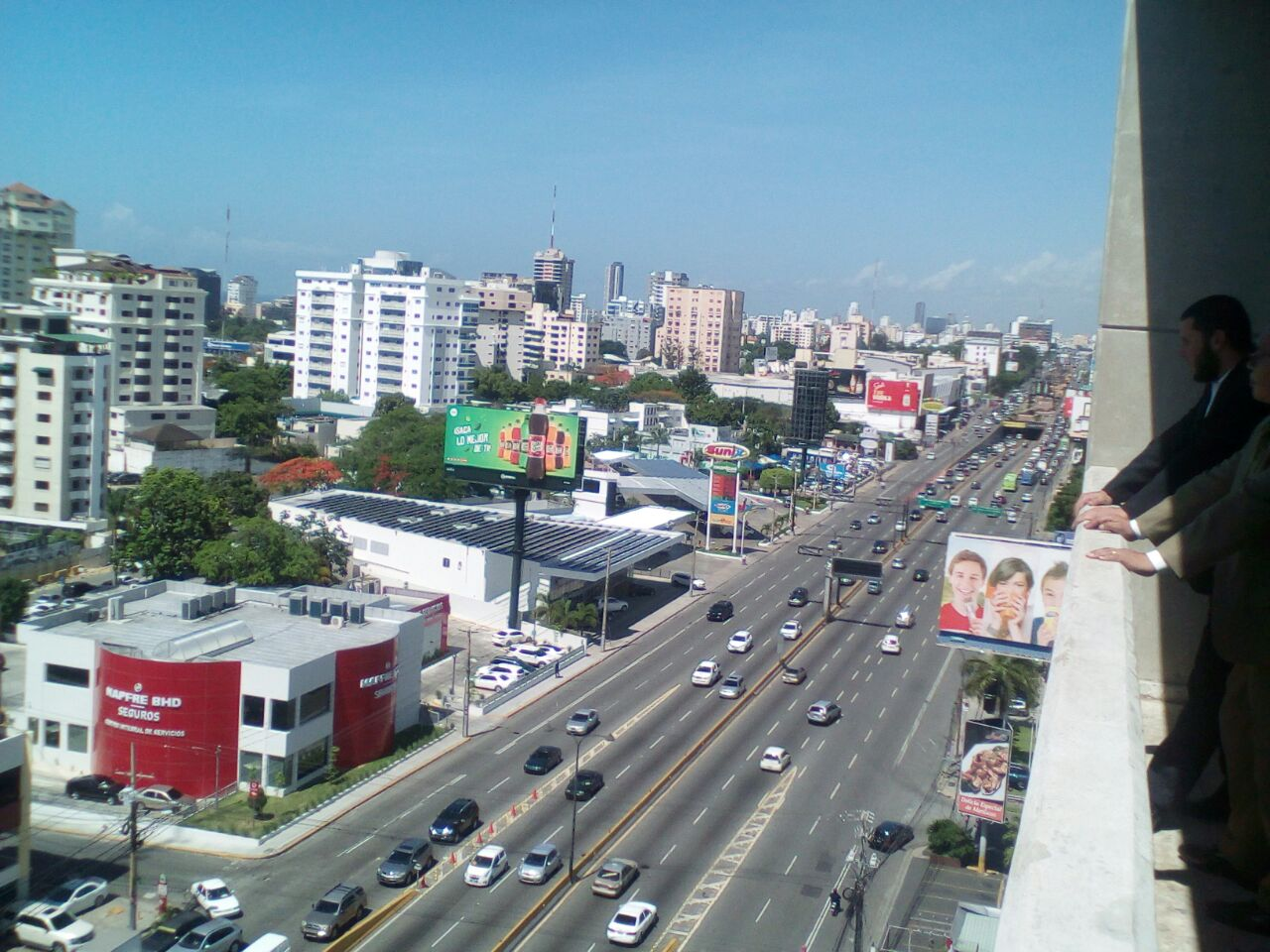
Avenida 27 de Febrero

Avenida 27 de Febrero: It is the main avenue to cross the National District from east to west in the central part of Santo Domingo. It starts at the Juan Bosch bridge and crosses the entire city until the roundabout at the Plaza de la Bandera, which extends into the town of Santo Domingo West and ends on the Duarte Highway. The thoroughfare is composed of a total of ten lanes. Five on each side. The four lanes in the center of the avenue are express that facilitate transit in the city from east to west, with several elevated cross streets, overpasses and tunnels. It also has exclusive bus lanes.

Avenida Simón Bolívar: It extends from Independence Park to the junction with the Avenue Winston Churchill. In its entirety, this avenue is composed of two local lanes one-way east- west.

Avenida Independencia: It extends from the intersection with Avenida Gregorio Luperón to Independence Park. The avenue consists of a total of four lanes (two eastbound and two westbound ) from crossing with Av G. Luperon to the intersection of Avenida Italia . From the junction with Av Italy until Independence Park Avenue becomes one-way eastbound and contains only two lanes.

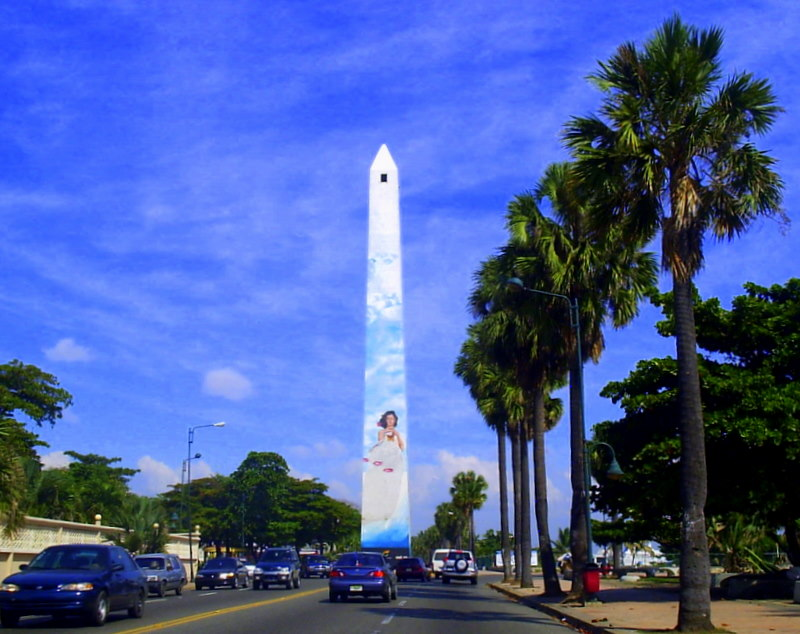
Avenida George Washington

Avenida George Washington: It is colloquially referred as "El Malecón" This is Santo Domingo's Maritime Boulevard, running alongside the Caribbean sea's waterfront. It extends from Palo Hincado Street to the intersection with Abraham Lincoln Avenue; from that point to the Haina River Highway 30 May extends also includes President Billini Walk, which starts in Palo Hincado street and joins the Avenida del Puerto along the western bank of the Ozama River. Throughout its entire length it is composed of four lanes (two on each side). On this Boulevard you will find the most exclusive hotels in the city, several casinos, the mixed business and residential high rise complex Malecón Center, the Obelisk and Eugenio María de Hostos' Park. This is also the Boulevard where the Santo Domingo Carnival parade takes place.

Avenida Winston Churchill: It extends from Kennedy Avenue to Avenida 27 de Febrero, from there on, it continues as Avenida Jimenez Moya to reach the Centro de los Heroes and finally the boardwalk. This thoroughfare is distinguished by its date palms that are planted on the sidewalks . Throughout its length the road is composed of six lanes (three on each side) and a large wooded median popularly known as Boulevard de la Churchill ("Churchill's Boulevard") and within this lies the Boulevard of the Stars.

Avenida Abraham Lincoln: extends from Avenida Kennedy to the seawall. The route consists of six lanes (three on each side) and a median suitable for jogging laid with palm trees. It traverses the city's commercial and leisure city center.

Avenida José Ortega y Gasset: It extends from the Paseo de los Reyes Católicos Avenue until 27 de Febrero. The avenue consists of four lanes, two on each side. Along this avenue lies the Centro Olímpico Juan Pablo Duarte athletic complex and the Hospital General de la Plaza de la Salud medical complex.

Avenida Tiradentes: It extends from the jetty in the south, through the state's university Universidad Autónoma de Santo Domingo. It extends to the north along Avenida 27 de Febrero, John F. Kennedy, and continuing north past the city's baseball stadium Estadio Quisqueya until it reaches the Parque Zoológico Nacional National Zoo.

Avenida Gregorio Luperón: It extends from Kennedy Avenue to Highway 30 May on the western edge of Santo Domingo. The thoroughfare consists of eight lanes, four on each side and a landscaped median. Local attractions located on this strip includes Gallístico Center Herrera Industrial Zone, and the Plaza de la Bandera.

Avenida Máximo Gómez y Báez: The city's main south–north avenue, it extends from the Malecón to the Presidente Peynado bridge. The boulevard consists of four lanes, two on each side. Major buildings and points of interest along this boulevard are: the National Cemetery, Plaza de la Cultura which houses the National Theatre and the Palace of Fine Arts. There are also two universities (UNAPEC and UTESA), as well as the headquarters of the People's Bank and five star hotel "Hotel Barceló Santo Domingo".

Avenida Juan Pablo Duarte: It extends from the intersection of Avenida Paseo and Martyrs of the Catholic Monarchs to Calle Padre Billini in the Colonial Zone . The avenue consists of three lanes on a road north–south direction becomes one lane to enter the Colonial Zone . This avenue is the main commerce route for low-income people throughout the metropolitan area with department stores, restaurants, and shops that offer goods and services at modest prices . In "Duarte" (as popularly known) you can find the New Market, the Enriquillo Park, Duarte Commercial Square and Santo Domingo's Chinatown.

Avenida Nicolás de Ovando y Cáceres: Is located on the northern part of Santo Domingo starting at the roundabout Cristo Rey sector and corner with Ortega y Gasset, Máximo Gómez, Arbert Duarte and Thomas avenues, among others; culminating in the sector of Simón Bolívar . This avenue is characterized by many businesses that sell auto parts .

== Sports ==
=== Baseball ===
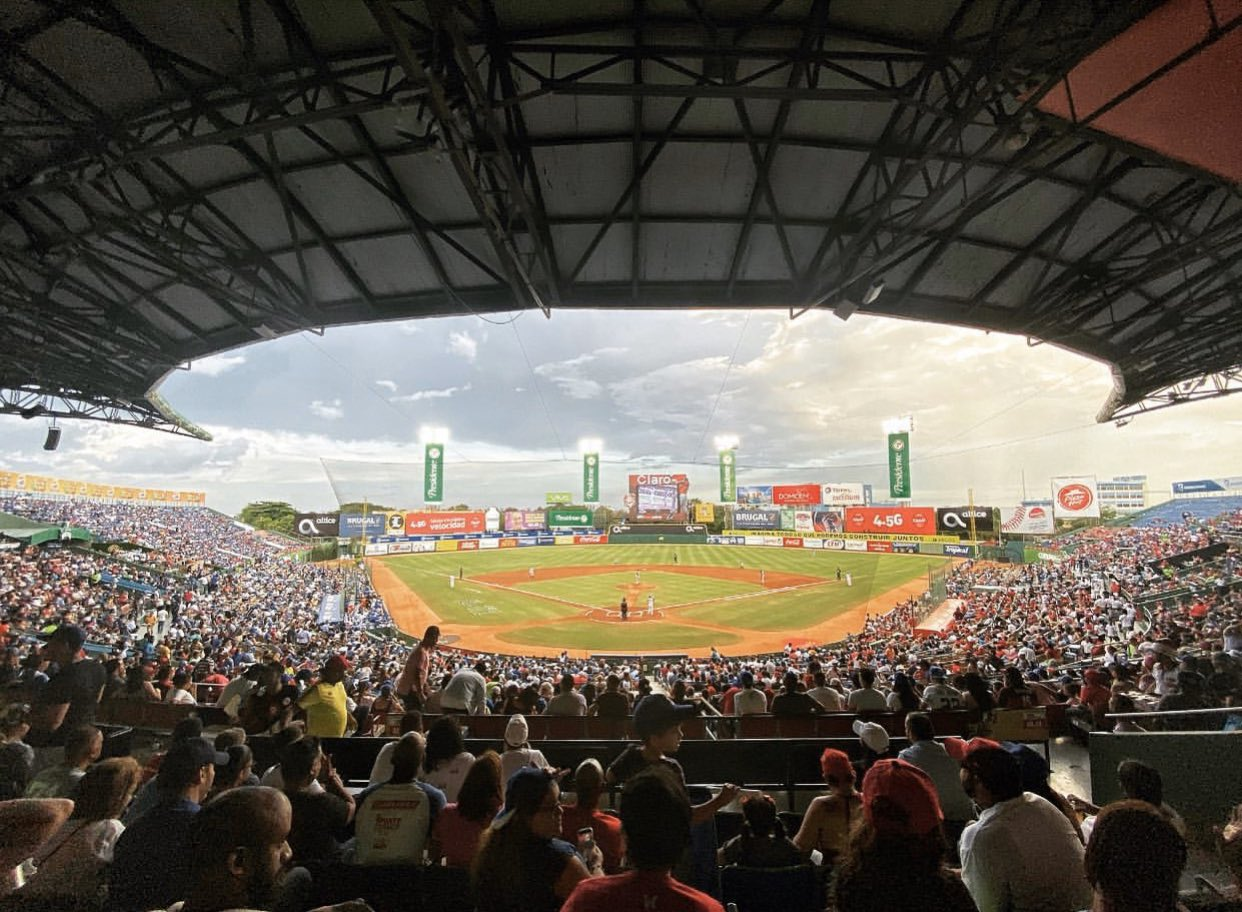
Estadio Quisqueya

Baseball, introduced by the United States Marines, is the most popular sport in the Dominican Republic. Santo Domingo is home to two of the six teams in the Dominican Professional Baseball League.

- Tigres del Licey, founded in 1907, have won 24 national championships since 1951. It is the most senior national team, winning 11 Caribbean Series titles as well.
- Leones del Escogido, founded in 1921, are winners of 16 national championships since 1951. It is the third team with the most championships won. The team has 4 titles won in the Caribbean Series.

These two teams are based in the Estadio Quisqueya located in Ensanche La Fe. The stadium underwent renovation in 2007, which expanded its number of seats and the overall look of the field. The bullpens are now enclosed and out of play. Former president Leonel Fernández also announced in 2009 that there are plans to turn the stadium and the adjacent area into a modern sports complex.

=== Basketball ===
Santo Domingo's Basketball Tournament Superior is held in the National District each year, with several teams participating and representing several sectors and social clubs of the city.

Some of the teams participating in the tournament include:

- El Millón
- Rafael Barias
- Los Prados
- Mauricio Báez
- Mejoramiento social (BAMESO)
- Huellas del Siglo
- San Carlos
- San Lázaro

The city hosted the 2005 FIBA Americas Championship, which was played at the Palacio de los Deportes Virgilio Travieso Soto.

=== Sports clubs ===
- Club Arroyo Hondo
- Club Casa de España
- Club de Villa Francisca
- Club Los Prados
- Club Mauricio Báez
- Club Deportivo Naco
- Club Paraíso
- Club San Carlos
- Club San Lázaro
- Club Santo Domingo
- Club Libanés Sirio Palestino

== Twin towns – sister cities ==
Santo Domingo is twinned with:

- Bogotá, Colombia
- Buenos Aires, Argentina
- Caracas, Venezuela
- Catbalogan, Philippines
- Curitiba, Brazil
- Guadalajara, Mexico
- Haifa, Israel
- Havana, Cuba
- Hunan province, China
- La Muela, Spain
- Madrid, Spain
- Manaus, Brazil (2009)
- Paris, France
- Pontevedra, Spain
- Providence, Rhode Island, United States
- Rosario, Argentina
- Quito, Ecuador
- Santa Cruz de Tenerife, Spain
- Santiago, Philippines
- Taipei, Taiwan
- Seoul, South Korea
- Busan, South Korea

Santo Domingo has four sister cities designated by Sister Cities International:

- St. Augustine, Florida, United States
- Miami-Dade County, Florida, United States
- Miami, United States
- New York, United States

== Gallery ==
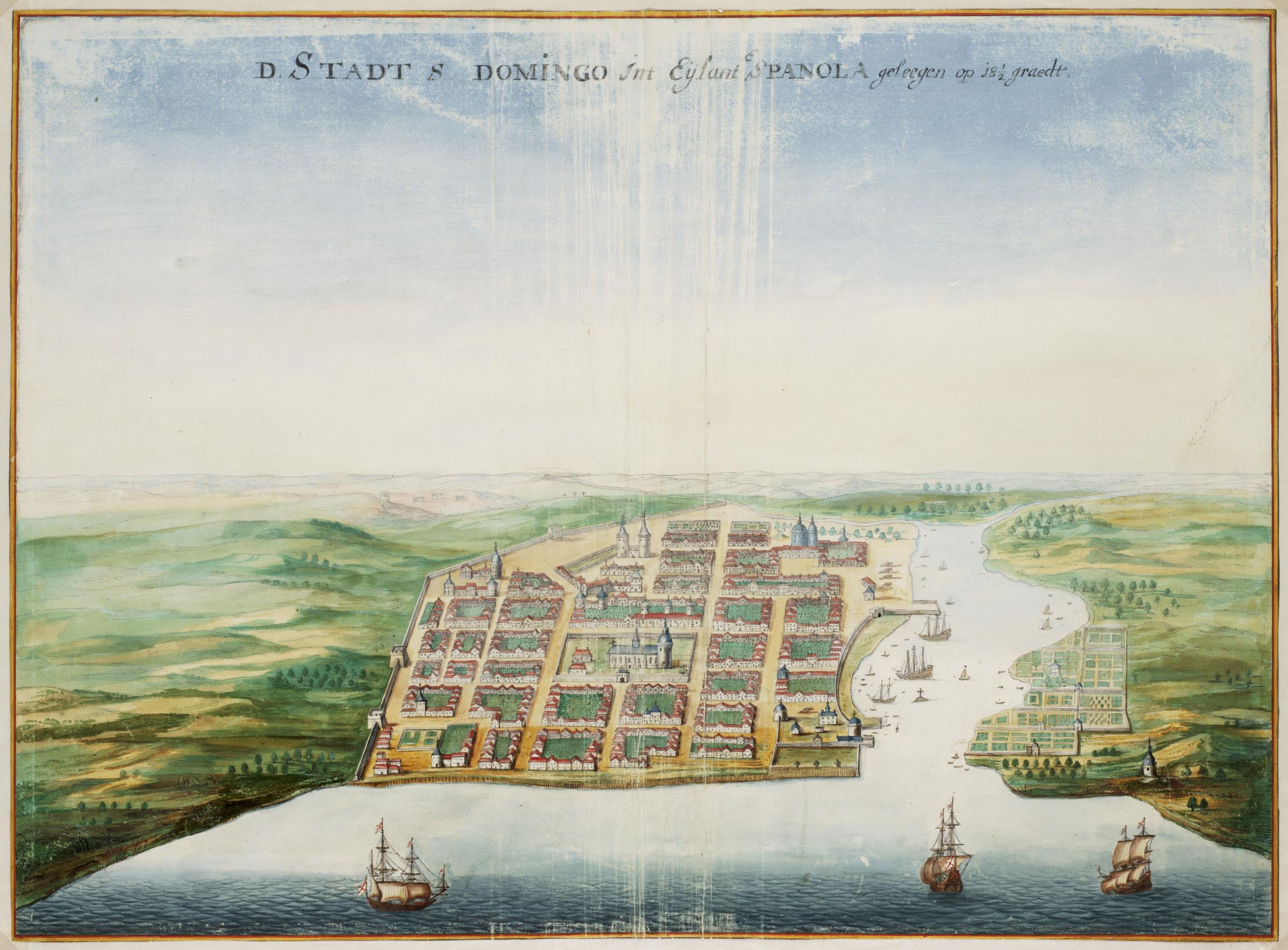
Santo Domingo city as depicted by Johannes Vingboons in 1665. Nationaal Archief

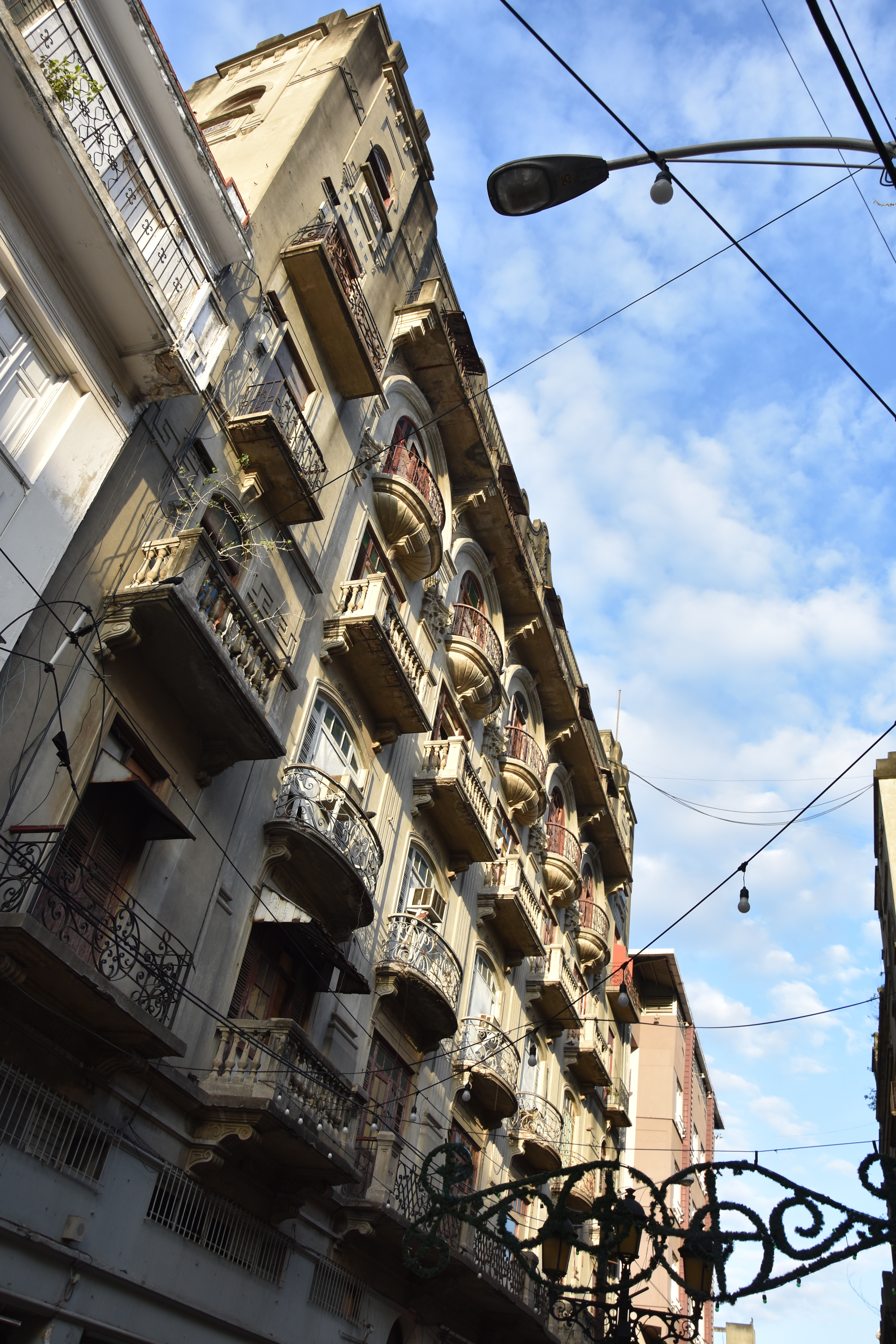
Edificio Diez

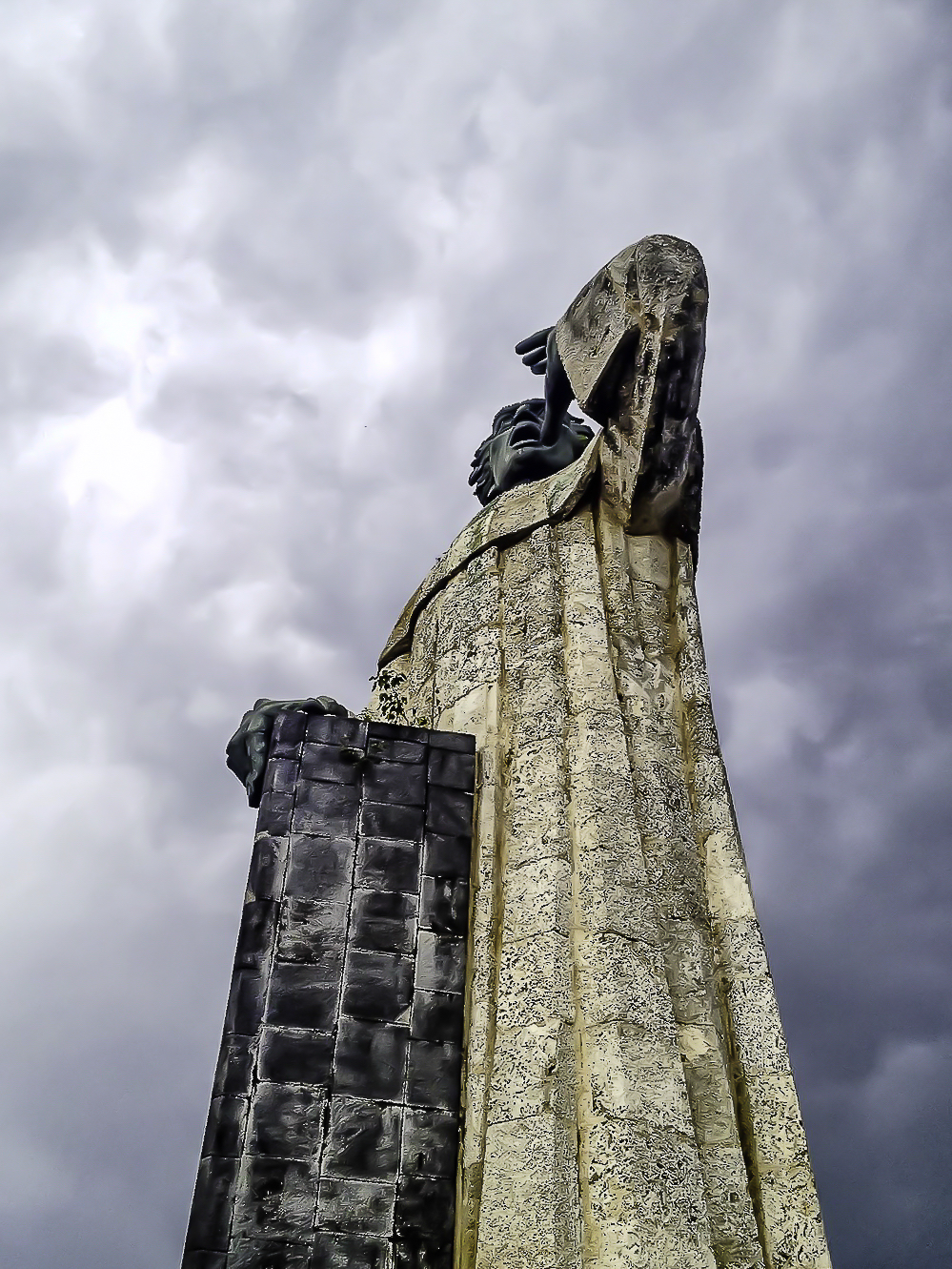
Statue of Antonio de Montesinos

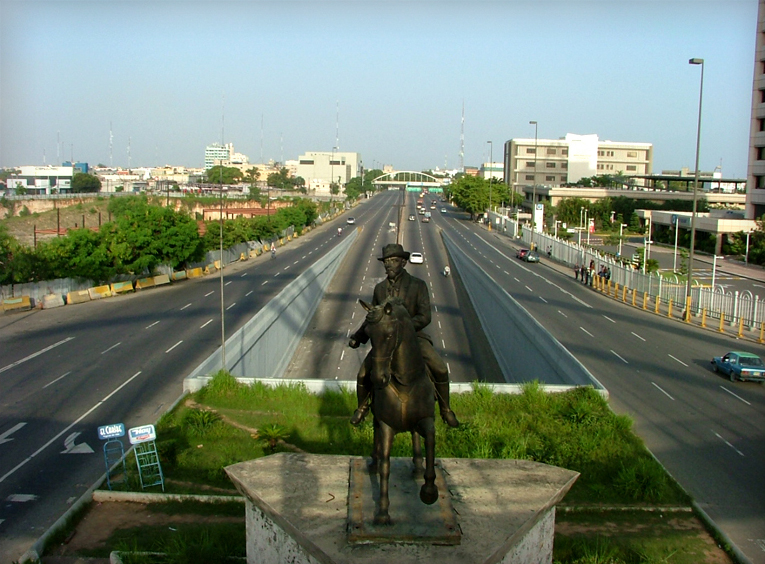
John F. Kennedy Avenue, Santo Domingo

Santo Domingo at night

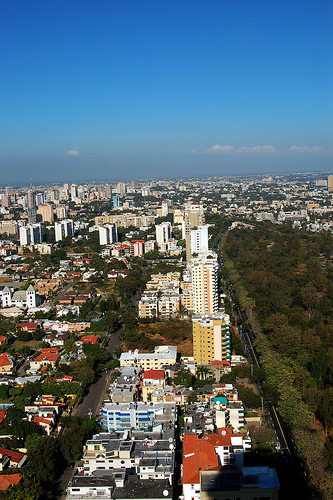
Anacaona Avenue in Santo Domingo. Mirador del Sur park

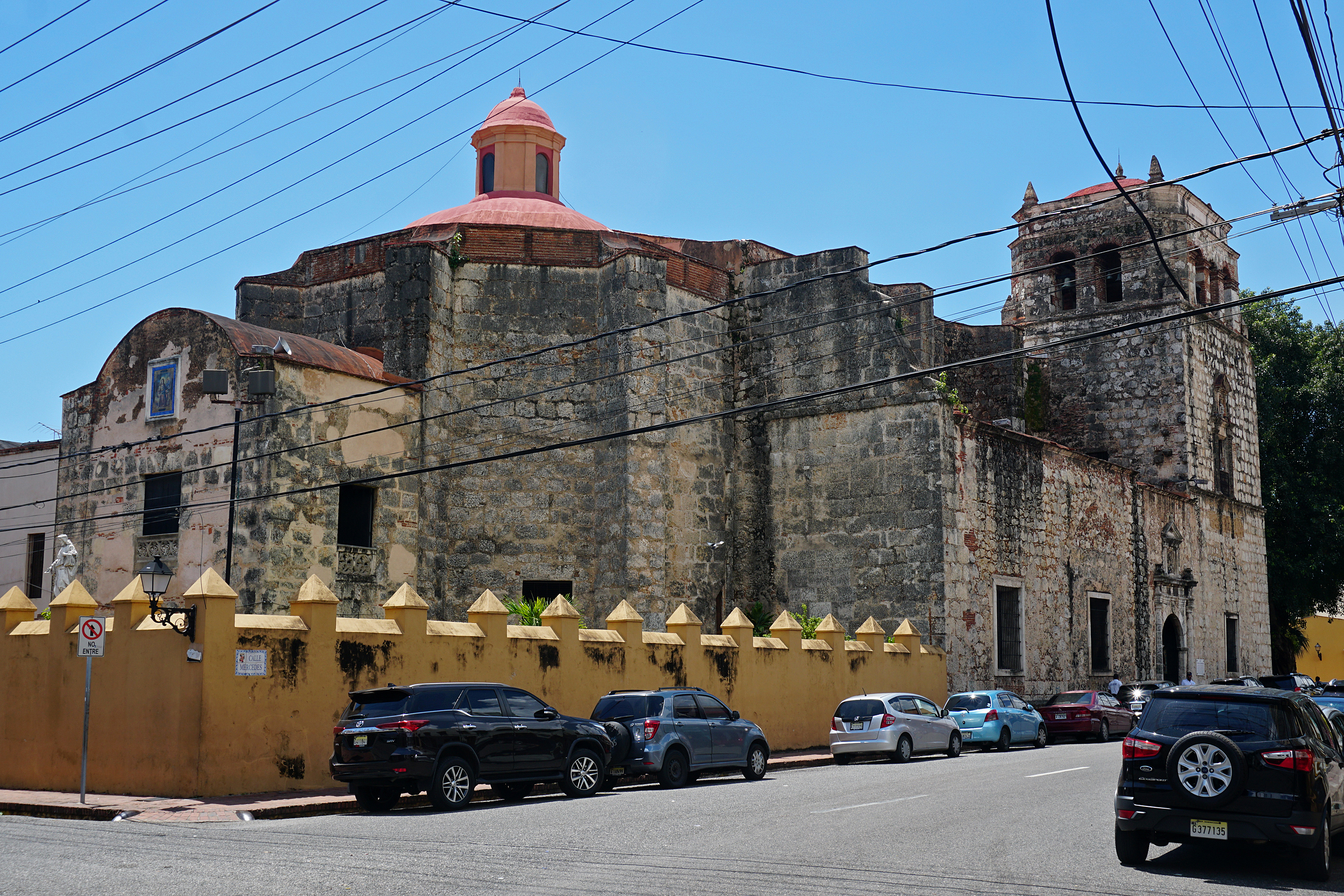
Church of Nuestra Señora de Las Mercedes

National pantheon

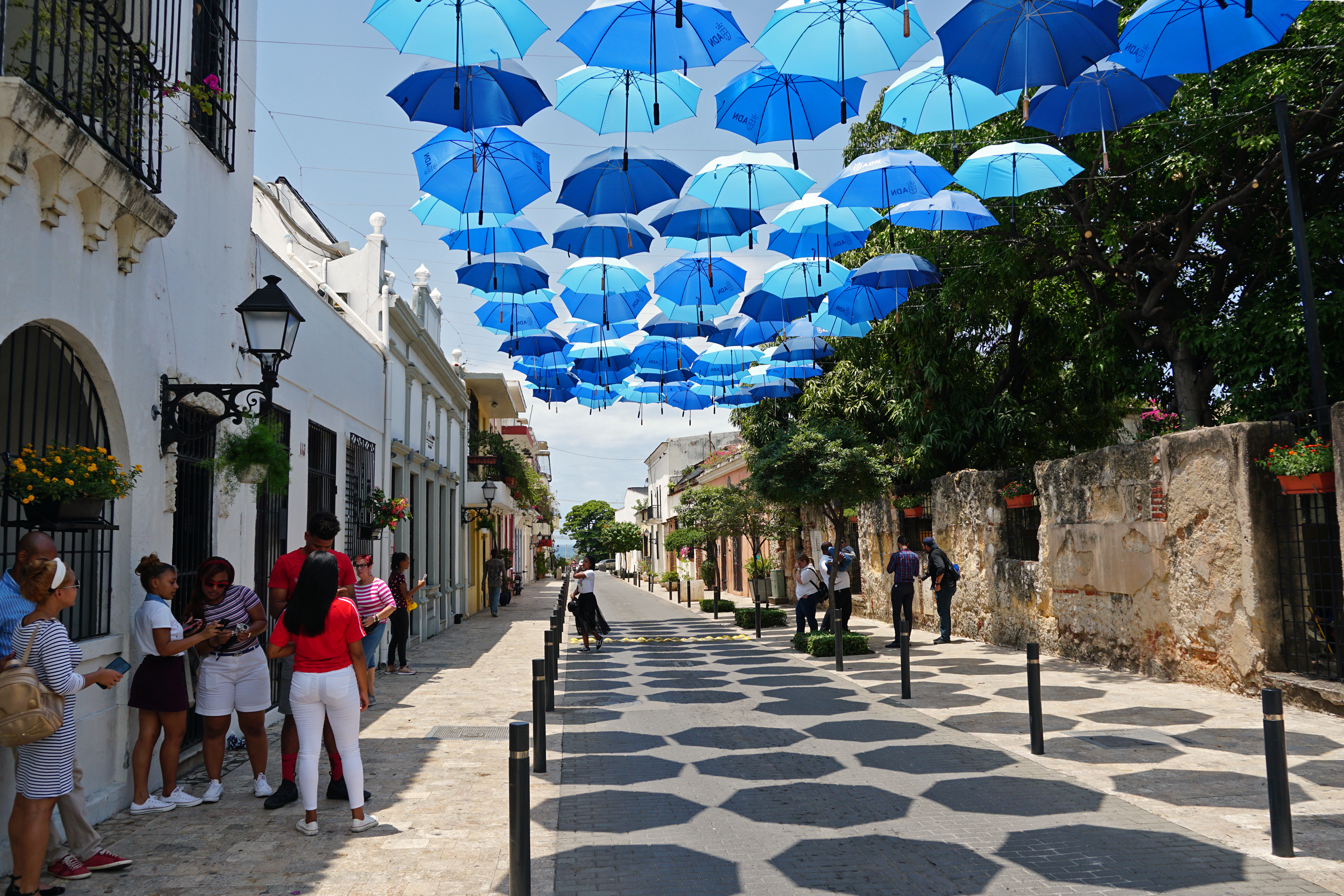
Calle Arzobispo Meriño

== Notable people ==
- Oscar de la Renta (1932–2014), fashion designer
- Juan Luis Guerra (born 1957), Dominican musician and record producer
- Jeannette Miller, Dominican poet
- Josefa Perdomo (1834–1896), Dominican poet

== See also ==
- Ciudad Colonial (Santo Domingo)
- List of oldest buildings in the Americas
- History of the Dominican Republic
  - Spanish colonization of the Americas
- List of cities in the Dominican Republic
- Culture of the Dominican Republic
- List of cities in the Caribbean

== Bibliography ==
- Meinig, D.W. (1986). The Shaping of America: A Geographic Perspective on 500 Years of History. Volume I – Atlantic America, 1492–1800. New Haven: Yale University Press. ISBN 0-300-03882-8.
- Banreservas. Santo Domingo: Fragmentos de Patria. Banco de Reservas de la República Dominicana. ISBN 99934-898-1-6.
