= Water resources management in the Dominican Republic =

Water resources management in Dominican Republic
- Withdrawals by sector 2000/2001: Domestic: 11%; Agriculture: 89%; Industry: 0%
- Renewable water resources: 21 km^{3} (1977–2001)
- Surface water produced internally: 21 km^{3}
- Groundwater recharge: 12 km^{3}
- Overlap shared by surface water and groundwater: 12 km^{3}
- Renewable water resources per capita: 2,430 m^{3} per year
- Wetland designated as Ramsar sites: 20,000 ha
- Hydropower generation: 14%

With surface water resources of 20 billion m^{3} per year, of which 12 billion m^{3} are groundwater recharge, water resources in the Dominican Republic could be considered abundant. But irregular spatial and seasonal distribution, coupled with high consumption in irrigation and urban water supply, translates into water scarcity. Rapid economic growth and increased urbanization have also affected environmental quality and placed strains on the Dominican Republic's water resources base. In addition, the Dominican Republic is exposed to a number of natural hazards, such as hurricanes, storms, floods, Drought, earthquakes, and fires. Global climate change is expected to induce permanent climate shocks to the Caribbean region, which will likely affect the Dominican Republic in the form of sea level rise, higher surface air and sea temperatures, extreme weather events (such as tropical storms and hurricanes), increased rainfall intensity (leading to both more frequent and severe flooding) and more frequent and more severe "El Niño-like" conditions.

Water resources management in the country, in particular water quality, quantity and Watershed management faces major challenges today. Despite the lack of systematic data limiting an accurate and detailed assessment of the scope of the problems, there is a consensus that: (i) the overall poor quality of surface, groundwater and coastal water resources is the result of a lack of waste water management and agricultural run-off, causing health problems that disproportionately affect the poor; (ii) water scarcity is a regional problem resulting from poor demand management in irrigation, urban water supply and tourist infrastructure in drier regions; (iii) weak watershed management leads to soil erosion and amplifies the damage and frequency of flooding; and (iv) the overall lack of solid waste management pollutes water sources, causes disease and is a nuisance for inhabitants and visitors alike. The Dominican Republic's government is in the process of reducing its role as main investor for water resources infrastructure and services provider decentralizing some responsibilities to local and regional government, water users organizations, and private companies.

== Water management history and recent developments ==
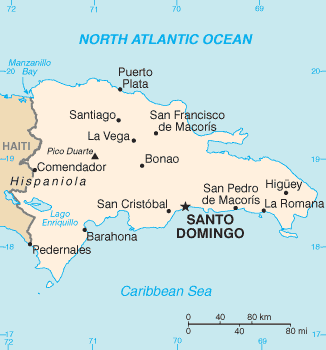
Map of the Dominican Republic

During the end of the 19th century and 20th century, the Dominican Republic government was one of the main investor in the country's hydraulic infrastructure development. Primarily focused on developing irrigation infrastructure in the first three quarters of the past century, Dominican Republic government invested on canal networks and irrigation technology increasing the area under irrigation from 32,000 hectares (ha) in the 1940s to 132,000 ha in 1954. In 1965, the Dominican Republic government created the National Institute for the Development of Water Resources (Instituto Nacional de Desarrollo de los Recursos Hidraulicos– INDRHI) responsible for planning the sustainable use of water resources and associated resources, as well as designing, formulating, executing, monitoring and evaluating projects, programs and actions aimed at controlling and regulating superficial and groundwater. Over the last three decades, the Dominican Republic government has decentralized a number of responsibilities in the water sector to other institutions, such as operation and maintenance of infrastructure and water fee collection to irrigation districts and regional water and sewer companies. In addition, the electricity sector has been partially privatized in 1998–99, with hydropower remaining in public hands.

== Tourism in the Dominican Republic ==
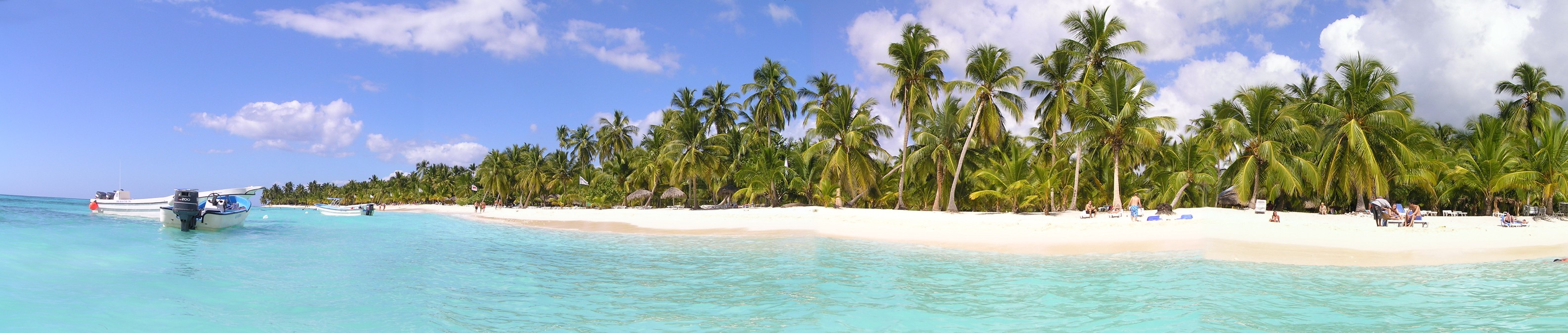
A beach on Saona Island

Tourism is one of the main economic activities in the DR. Indeed, Tourism currently comprises 13% of GDP and contributes 29% of total export earning. In addition, tourism host more than 200 companies and employ 200,000 people. Tourism depends to a great extent on the quality of water resources and the coastal environment. However, the tourism industry is threatened by the deficiency of the water and sewerage services and the environmental pollution caused by inadequate management and disposal of sewage and solid waste.

On the other hand, tourism harms the Dominican Republic's water resources and environment. WRM issues associated with tourism include: dumping of untreated waste water and solid waste along the coast, overexploitation of groundwater, destruction of forest cover, and overfishing of coral reef and marine species.

== Water resource base ==
=== Surface and groundwater resources ===
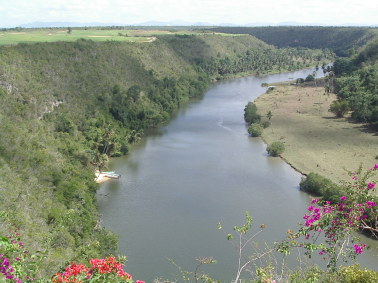
Rio Chavon in the Eastern DR near La Romana Province

The Dominican Republic's internal water resources per capita is 2,430 cubic meters, which is below the average for Central American and the Caribbean region, 6,645. Current water demand of 10 billion m^{3} represents 44 percent of total available freshwater resources. According to the World Bank only Barbados, the DR, Mexico, and Peru exceed 10 percent demand in the Latin America and Caribbean region. Water scarcity is reflected in increasing competition for surface water allocation and unsustainable groundwater abstraction.

Characteristics of the drainage basins
Watershed	River basin	Drainage surface (km^{2})	Average annual rainfall (mm)	Average annual run off (billion m^{3}/year) (1)
Caribbean	Bahoruco Mountains	2,814	750–2,000	9,500
Caribbean	Yaque del Sur River	5,345	700–1,500	9,500
Caribbean	Azua, Bani, San Cristobal	4,460	750–2,000	9,500
Caribbean	Ozama River	2,706	1,400-2,250	9,500
Caribbean	San Pedro de Marcoris and La Romana	4,629	1,000-2,250	9,500
Caribbean	Higuey	2,207	1,000-1,750	9,500
Atlantic	Miches and Sabana del Mar	2,265	200-2700	10,480
Atlantic	Samana Peninsula	854	N/A	10,480
Atlantic	Northern coastal zone	4,266	1,000-2,300	10,480
Atlantic	Yuna River	5,630	1,170-2,250	10,480
Atlantic	Yaque del Norte River	7,053	500–2,000	10,480
Atlantic	Dajabon River	858	750–2,000	10,480
Haiti	Artibonite River	2,653	1,200-2,000	1,015
Enriquillo	Lake Enriquillo	3,048	600-750	(2)
Total		48,730	1,500	20,995

Source: Food and Agriculture Organization (1) Total run off including superficial and groundwater run off. (2) Enriquillo Lake's run off is included in the Caribbean watershed total run off

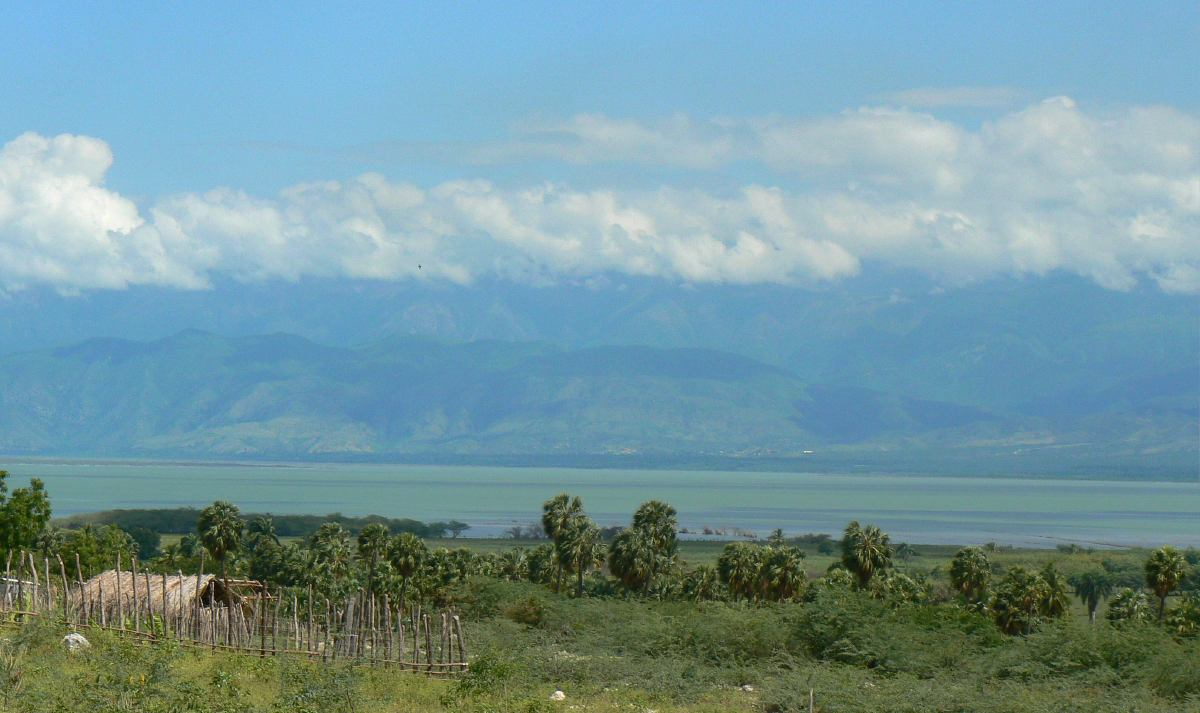
South shore of the saline Lake Enriquillo, looking northward to the Sierra de Neiba mountains; Independencia Province.

According to the Food and Agriculture Organization, groundwater has a potential of 1,500 million m^{3}/year, but less than a third of this value is actually being extracted. Although coastal limestone aquifers contain only about 4 percent of the available groundwater reserves, human activities in the southeast of the country (from Santo Domingo to La Romana and Punta Cana) are heavily dependent on them – for example, some 30 percent of Santo Domingo's water supply comes from underground sources. As a result, coastal limestone aquifers are overdrafted and seawater intrusion already reaches inland 20 to 50 km from the seashore. Many coastal aquifers are at risk of contamination from agrochemicals and poorly located solid waste disposal, contributing to water scarcity by making resources unavailable.

=== Storage capacity and infrastructure ===
According to the Food and Agriculture Organization, the Dominican Republic dams’ storage capacity is 2,144 million m^{3}, 85 percent of which is stored in reservoirs behind large dams (those whose capacity exceeds 100 million m3). Most large reservoirs store water for multiple purposes (drinking water supply, flood control, irrigation and hydroelectric).

The largest reservoirs in the country are Hatillo (700 million m^{3}) in the Yuna River, Sabana Yegua (560 million m^{3}) in the Yaque del Sur River, Bao (244 million m^{3}) in the Bao river and Jiguey (169 million m^{3}) and Valdesía (137 million m^{3}), both in the Nizao River.

=== Water quality ===
Although few studies on water quality have been carried out over the last two decades and there is a crucial lack of adequate and consistent monitoring, scattered evidence suggests that the levels of nutrients, organic matter, and bacteriological contamination in water are high. For example, the proportion of samples with coliforms in aqueducts served by INAPA (the main water company, supplying 40 percent of the population) increased from 17 percent in 1994 to 23 percent in 1998. This is particularly striking because according to Dominican Republic standards, presence of coliforms in more than 5 percent of samples indicates that water is no longer potable.

Water pollution is largely the product of poor urban wastewater management but solid waste and agriculture are also water polluters. In some cases, high salinity, pesticides and other pollutants are present in water close to agricultural, urban, and industrial areas. Downstream of metal mining, flows of effluents also show high levels of cadmium, chrome and other heavy metals – high levels of mercury have been found in the waters of Samana Bay and the presence of pesticides and persistent organic pollutants (such as DDT and PCBs) in estuary mollusks has also been reported.

== Water resources management by sector ==
=== Drinking water and sanitation ===
The Dominican Republic has achieved impressive increases in access to water supply and sanitation over the past two decades. However, the quality of water supply and sanitation services remains poor, despite the country's high economic growth during the 1990s. The DR, with a population of 8.8 million, of which about 60% are located in urban areas, has a high level of water services in urban areas with 97% coverage and 92% of the urban population with household connections (as compared to an average of 90% in the LAC region).

		Urban (60% of the population)	Rural (40% of the population)	Total
Water	Broad definition	97%	91%	95%
Water	House connections	92%	62%	80%
Sanitation	Broad definition	81%	73%	78%
Sanitation	Sewerage	65%	27%	50%

Source: WHO/UNICEF Joint Monitoring Program (2006). (Water and sanitation based on Dominican Republic Demographic and Health Survey (2002). The Joint Monitoring Program data do not mention the 2002 census as a source. According to the census, as quoted in Uriana Abreu, Slide 15, coverage for sanitation (broad definition) was 93% (96% in urban areas and 88% in rural areas). These higher coverage figures may be due to a broader definition of improved sanitation in the census compared to the Demographic and Health Survey used as a source by the JMP)

There are substantial regional differences in coverage. For example, in nine provinces located in the Central, Northeastern and Eastern part of the country less than 70% of the population had access to an improved source of water supply according to the 2002 census.

Poor households exhibit lower levels of access: only 56% of poor households are connected to water house connections as opposed to 80% of non-poor households. Just 20% of poor households have access to sewers, as opposed to 50% for the non-poor.

=== Irrigation and drainage ===
About 76% of Dominican Republic's land area (8,900 km2) is dedicated to agriculture, 17% of which is irrigated. According to the Food and Agriculture Organization, 270,000 ha are equipped for irrigation. INDRHI estimates the area suitable for irrigation at up to 710,000 ha, taking into account soil suitability and water resources availability. Most of the irrigated areas are located in the valleys between the mountain ranges, with a medium to low rainfall and few limitations on its soil such as slope, depth of soil, and in some cases, salinity problems associated with irrigation or the presence of saline groundwater.

Needs in the irrigation subsector are related to improving efficiency, productivity and organizational aspects. According to the Food and Agriculture Organization, solutions should be sought in the use of better technology, efficient operation of irrigation systems and adequate means of financial support. Poor maintenance of existing infrastructure and irrational use of water are causes for the low (overall) irrigation efficiency.

Irrigation Management Transfer to Water Users Associations (WUAs), formally started in the mid-1980s, is still an ongoing process showing positive signs with irrigation systems in 127,749 ha (46% of total irrigated land in the country), being managed by 41,329 users (57% of all users). However, the transfer process and the performance of WUAs are still far from ideal. While WUAs show a significant increase in cost recovery, especially when compared to low values in areas under state management, a high subsidy from the government still contributes to cover operation and maintenance costs in their systems.

=== Hydropower ===
In 2008 the Dominican Republic had a hydroelectric capacity of 470 MW, accounting for 14% of electricity generating capacity. It is expected that, by 2012, an additional 762MW will have been added. The first three new hydropower plants, with a combined capacity of 240MW, are:

- Pinalito with 50 MW on the Rio Tireo and the Rio Blanco,
- Palomino with 99 MW at the confluence of the rivers Yaque Del Sur River and the Rio Blanco, and
- Las Placetas with 87 MW, involving an interbasin transfer from the Rio Bao to the Rio Jaguá

The two first plants were under construction in 2008.

The detailed share for the different sources is as follows:

Source	Installed capacity (MW)	Share (%)
Steam turbines	606.2	17.9%
Gas turbines	572.7	16.9%
Combined cycle	804	23.7%
Fuel oil engines	912	26.9%
Diesel oil engines	30	0.9%
Hydroelectricity	469.3	13.8%

Source: Electricity Superintendence Statistics, 2006

== Legal and institutional framework ==
=== Legal framework ===
The present Water Law, No. 5852 passed in 1962 and modified by laws 281, 238, and 431, established the main aspects of the legal framework for water resources management in the DR, including: (i) water as a public domain (meaning that ownership of water either resides with land owners or is public), (ii) water use concessions system, (iii) prioritization of municipal water use, (iv) pollution of water ban, and (v) participation of users in water resources management. The Water Law ties water rights to land ownership or public service providers and establish a limited private property right of water, only for water originating in owner's land such as springs and rain water.

In addition, Law No. 6 of 1965 created the National Institute for Water Resources (INDRHI), the national water authority, assigning it functions at three levels: (i) policy development and planning at the constitutional (normative) level; (ii) water rights administration, regulation enforcement and hydrological services at the organizational level; and (iii) water use for the irrigation system at the operational level.

=== Institutional framework ===
The Dominican Water Resource Institute – INDRHI, under the Ministry of the Environment, is responsible for managing water and related resources as well as designing, implementing, monitoring and evaluating programs, projects and activities aimed at controlling and regulating surface and groundwater use. INDRHI collaborates with other sectoral institutions such as: (i) the State Secretariat for Agriculture and the Dominican Agriculture Institute, (ii) the Water Supply and Sanitation "Institute" INAPA, a utility operating in small towns and rural areas, and regional water and sanitation utilities in the cities of Santo Domingo, Santiago, Moca, Puerto Plata and Romana, (iii) the Ministry of Public Health, and (iv) the Dominican Electricity Corporation.

=== Government strategy ===
The Dominican Republic's government is in the process of designing a new legal and institutional framework for water resources management. In particular, the government is drafting a new General Water Law and Water Supply and Sanitation Law after various previous attempts. The development of the legal and institutional framework for integrated water resources management will depend greatly on these laws.

=== International agreements ===
The Dominican Republic and Haiti signed the Treaty of Peace, Friendship and Arbitration on 20 February 1929, which included an agreement on the border definition and the water sharing of several rivers such as the Artibonite River, Pedernalis and Massacre rivers. Both parties agreed not to construct any works that would change the course or flow of any shared rivers.

The basin is managed by the ‘Service des Ressources en Eau’ (SNRE) in Haiti and by the ‘Instituto Nacional de Recursos Hídricos’ (INDRHI) in the Dominican Republic. Both entities are endowed with capable human resources although financial means are scarce, especially in Haiti. Basin disputes have mostly taken root because of complex economic, social and political reasons, rather than because of a lack of support or coordination by both technical areas.

== Financial aspects ==
=== Water users fees ===
According to the Food and Agriculture Organization, water fees are too low to meet maintenance and operation requirements for hydraulic infrastructure. For instance, cost recovery for water and sanitation is minimal. Average tariffs are moderate at US$0.21 per cubic meter for water and US$0.07 per cubic meter for sewerage. In addition, collection rates for water supply and sanitation are extremely low at only 28%. As a result of moderate tariffs and very low collection rates, according to a WHO estimate in 1998, households paid on average only US$0.50 per month for water and US$0.09 per month for sewerage. Not surprisingly, the regional water and sewer companies and INAPA (the national water and sewerage authority) rely largely on transfers from the central budget to fund their operations. The existing schemes lack transparency and efficiency in the use of subsidies.

The situation is similar for irrigation services were annual fees varies from US$4.75/ha in some regions to US$24/ha in other regions. Water costs for a farmer only represent 0.21 to 0.58% of total production cost. Operation and Maintenance expenditure in INDRHI's Irrigation Districts for 1997 was US$6.24 million (average U.S. $35/ha.) while returns (income for water fees) was only 13.8% of this value.

=== Investment ===
According to the Food and Agriculture Organization, annual government investment in water resources and irrigation infrastructure is in the order of US$100 million. INDRHI's budget in 2001 was RD$930 million (about US$26 million), which was mainly focused on irrigation works despite INDRHI responsibilities for other water resources management responsibilities such as water quality and groundwater management.

== Environmental issues ==
=== Water related risks ===
Upper watershed degradation, primarily in the form of soil erosion, has significant downstream effects. Erosion rates have been estimated at four times those of 1980. Across the Dominican Republic, sedimentation has reduced reservoir capacity by some 10-25 percent, with important economic effects for the hydropower industry (assuming a loss of hydropower generation of a mere 20 percent, the cost of dam siltation only in hydropower generation lost would exceed US$10 million per year). In addition, watershed degradation increases the costs of maintaining other water systems, such as irrigation channels and water supply infrastructure, and it affects coastal water quality. High turbidity from land-based sediments prevents reefs from forming in most of the Dominican coast.

The Dominican Republic is exposed to a number of natural hazards, such as hurricanes, storms, floods, drought, earthquakes, and fires. The destructive force of these phenomena can be enormous - in 1998 Hurricane Georges caused economic losses estimated at US$2,193 (14 percent of gross national income), and 235 deaths. In particular, climate shocks have included a dramatic increase in the frequency of major weather events over the past forty years, with 491 recorded major weather events during the previous decade, as compared to 126 from 1960 to 1969. Flooding has emerged as the most common recorded disaster during the 1990s, replacing fires for the first time in nearly fifty years. Alarmingly, flooding is mostly due to non-extreme weather events. Out of the recorded 464 major flooding events between 1966 and 2000, only 33 were caused by hurricanes or tropical storms, while the overwhelming majority of flooding was caused by precipitation during the rainy season.

=== Potential climate change effects ===
Global climate change is expected to induce permanent climate shocks to the Caribbean region, which will include sea level rise, higher surface air and sea temperatures, extreme weather events (such as tropical storms and hurricanes), and more frequent and more severe "El Niño-like" conditions. Demographic growth accelerated environmental degradation, deforestation, and lack of mitigation measures will intensify the effect of disasters in the future.

In terms of climate change effects on water resources, and according to the Dominican Republic's first communication, it is expected a great decrease in spatial distribution of rainfall, and total runoff for the year 2100, demonstrating a structural change that intensifies the transition from the most humid zones to the driest and an expansion of the areas of the country that are historically the driest.

=== Ongoing programs and initiatives ===
In May 2008 the World Bank has approved a US$80 million loan to restore and strengthen irrigation, electricity, water, and sanitation infrastructure damaged by Tropical Storms Olga and Noel, enhance critical infrastructure to reduce future storm-related effects, and strengthen basic capacity for future risk management in INDRHI and CDEEE.

== See also ==
- Irrigation in the Dominican Republic
- Electricity sector in the Dominican Republic
- Water supply and sanitation in the Dominican Republic
