= List of dams and reservoirs in Dominican Republic =

There are numerous dams and reservoirs in the Dominican Republic, which has rivers, lakes, streams, and numerous waterfalls.

The main river in the Dominican Republic are the Yaque del Norte, which is the longest in the country at 201 km in length. The second largest and the strongest river is the Yuna River, which is 138 km in length. The third largest is the Yaque del Sur, which is 136 km in length.

River*	Dam (hydro-electric plant) place	Capacity (millions of m^{3})**	Year constructed
Yaque del Norte	Tavera	170	1973
Bao River	Bao	280	1984
Bao River	López-Angostura	4.4	1985
Jimenoa River	Jimenoa	0.3	1950
Maguaca River	Maguaca	15.6	1999
Chacuey River	Chacuey	13.7	1979
Yuna River	Hatillo	375.0	1984
Nizao River	Valdesia	137.0	1976
Nizao River	Jiguey	167.2	1992
Nizao River	Aguacate	4.3	1992
Nizao River	Las Barias	1.7	1976
Yaque del Sur	Sabana Yegua	354.0	1979
San Juan River	Sabaneta	63.0	1981
Blanco River	Rio Blanco	1.1	1996
Jima River	Rincon Dam	75.5	1978
Las Damas	Las Damas	0.4	1967
Mijo River	Mijo	1.6	1990
Mao River	Monción	369.4	2001
Cabeza De Caballo	Cabeza De Caballo	0.6	1988

Notes:

*Some rivers have the same name as dams or hydro-electric plants.
**Actual capacity might vary.

== See also ==
- Electricity sector in the Dominican Republic
- Geography of the Dominican Republic
- List of dams and reservoirs
