= List of rivers of the Dominican Republic =

This is a list of rivers in the Dominican Republic, arranged in clockwise order around the island starting in the northwest corner, with respective tributaries indented under each larger stream's name.

- Dajabón River (Massacre River)
- Yaque del Norte River
  - Mao River
- Yuna River
  - Camú River
- Guamira River
  - Maimón River
- Yuma River
- Chavón River
- Soco River
- Iguamo River (Higuamo River)
- Ozama River
  - Isabela River
  - Yabacao River
- Haina River
- Arroyo Blanco
- Ocoa River
- Nizao River
- Yaque del Sur River
  - Limón River
  - San Juan River
- Pedernales River
- Artibonite River
  - Macasía River
  - Libón River
  - Bao river
- Jima River
- Baní River
