= Irrigation in the Dominican Republic =

- Land area: 48,400 km^{2}
- Agricultural land: 76%
- Cultivated area equipped for irrigation: 17.2%
- Irrigated area: 280,000 ha
- Systems: Surface irrigation: 270,000 ha
- Share of irrigated agriculture in GDP: 13% (2008)
- Annual investment in irrigation: 100 million USD

Irrigation in the Dominican Republic (DR) has been integral to its agricultural and economic development in the 20th century. Public investment has driven most irrigation infrastructure development in the country. Irrigation Management Transfer to Water Users Associations (WUAs), which began in the mid-1980s, remains an ongoing process showing positive signs, with irrigation systems in 127,749 ha (46% of total irrigated land in the country) being managed by 41,329 users (57% of all users). However, the transfer process and WUAs' performance are still far from ideal. While WUAs show a significant increase in cost recovery, especially compared with low values in state-managed areas, a high government subsidy still helps cover operation and maintenance costs.

Irrigation water demand is 7,340.41 million m^{3}/year, or 82% of total demand (8,891,45 million m^{3}/year). Irrigation demand is covered mostly by surface water, and partially (13%) by groundwater. About 76% of the Dominican Republic's land area (8,900 km2) is dedicated to agriculture, and 17% is irrigated. According to FAO, 270,000ha are equipped for irrigation. Most irrigated areas are located in valleys between mountain ranges, with medium to low rainfall and few soil limitations such as slope, soil depth, and, in some cases, salinity problems associated with irrigation or the presence of saline groundwater. Annual government investment in water resources and irrigation infrastructure is around US$100 million.

Needs in the irrigation sector are related to improving efficiency, productivity and organizational aspects. According to the FAO, solutions should focus on better technology, efficient irrigation system operations, and adequate financial support. Poor maintenance of existing infrastructure and irrational use of water are responsible for the low (overall) irrigation efficiency.

== History of the irrigation sector ==
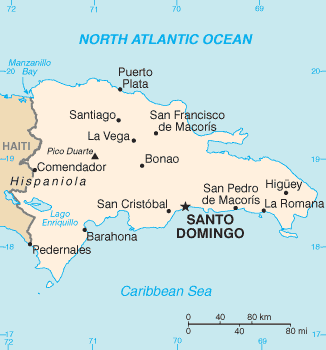
Map of the Dominican Republic

According to the Food and Agriculture Organization (FAO), irrigation development in the Dominican Republic started in the late 19th century, with the construction of the Juan Caballero, Luis Bogart and Santana canals and the Manzanillo Project. In the 1920s, irrigation development increased substantially, mostly due to government investment. The area under irrigation continued increasing in the 1940s and 1950s, from 32,000ha in 1941 to 132,000 in 1954. During the 1960s, hydraulic development shifted toward multi-purpose dams, then returned to canal network development for the next 30 years, reaching the current 280,000ha equipped with irrigation infrastructure.

The Irrigation Management Transfer Program (IMTP) started formally in the mid-1980s and continues until today. IMTP aims to decentralize operation and maintenance, and fee collection responsibilities, among others, to the Juntas de Regantes (Water Users Irrigation Boards - WUB). To date, 17 main WUBs have been formed, and 11 systems have formally transferred their operations to them. WUBs have a total membership of about 30,000 users. According to the FAO, some of the achievements of IMTP include: (i) reduced conflicts between the authority and water users, (ii) improved service, and (iii) higher fee collection (an increase from 20% of total charges, when managed by the National Institute for Water Resources, to almost 80% on their own). However, these results are far from ideal. For example, overall cost recovery remains low; therefore, O&M costs still depend on government subsidies.

== Irrigation infrastructure ==
Gravity and surface irrigation are the predominant systems supplying water for irrigation to an area of 278,965 ha.(gross area). According to FAO, this is about half the land where irrigation is feasible (550,000 ha.). The existing infrastructure comprises 1,836.4 km of main canals, 1,773.2 km of secondary canals, 1,200 km of drainage canals and 14 major dams. The total storage capacity is 1,450 million m^{3}. Actual water delivery is approximately 4,600 million m^{3}/year.

== Environmental aspects ==
=== Linkages with water resources ===
According to FAO, DR receives a mean annual precipitation of about 1,500 mm; with arid zones receiving as little as 500 mm/year, and humid areas receiving an average of 2,500 mm/year. Evapotranspiration exceeds 2,000 mm/year. Total runoff is estimated at 21,000 million m3/year.

Irrigation water demand is 7,340.41 million m^{3}/year, or 82% of total demand (8,891,45 million m^{3}/year). Irrigation demand is covered mostly by surface irrigation, and partially (13%) by groundwater.

=== Environmental impacts of irrigation ===
According to FAO, 125,000ha and 80,000ha are affected by drainage and salinity problems, respectively. The majority of which are located in the Valleys such as Cibao, Santiago Montecristi, Azua, San Juan de la Manguana, Neyba y Barahona as well as downstream Yuna and the eastern coastal area, in the provinces of Maria Trinidad Gracias y Altagracia, respectively.

=== Anticipated climate change impacts on irrigated agriculture ===
Global climate change is expected to induce permanent climate shocks to the Caribbean region, including sea level rise, higher surface air and sea temperatures, extreme weather events (such as tropical storms and hurricanes), increased rainfall intensity (leading to more frequent and severe flooding) and more frequent and severe "El Niño-like" conditions. Demographic growth, accelerated environmental degradation, deforestation, and lack of mitigation measures will intensify the impact of disasters in the future.

No information is currently available on the specific impacts of climate change on irrigated agriculture in the DR. Some data on the impact of Climate Change on water resources in the DR are available First Communication to the UNFCCC. Indeed, a large decrease in the spatial distribution of rainfall and total runoff for the year 2100 is expected, demonstrating a structural shift that intensifies the transition from the most humid zones to the driest and expands the areas of the country that are historically the driest.

== Legal and institutional framework ==
=== Legal framework ===
The Water Law, No. 5852, passed in 1962, promotes the creation of irrigation districts and irrigation organizations. Relevant aspects of this law include establishing limited property rights over water originating on one's land through springs and rainwater and linking water rights to land ownership.

Law No. 6 of 1965 created the National Institute for Water Resources (INDRHI), the national water authority, and assigned it functions for operating irrigation systems with user participation. INDRHI has been the promoter and developer of irrigation, thus having responsibility at three functional levels: policy development and planning at the constitutional (normative) level; water rights administration, regulation enforcement and hydrological services at the organizational level; and water use for the irrigation system at the operational level.

Presidential decrees and agreements between INDRHI and Water Users Associations (Asociaciones de Regantes- WUA) have provided legal support for the Irrigation Management Transfer Program (IMTP) (see below).

=== Institutional framework ===
The Dominican Water Resource Institute – INDRHI, under the Ministry of the Environment, manages water and related resources, and designs, implements, monitors, and evaluates programs, projects and activities aimed at controlling and regulating surface and groundwater use.

INDRHI also manages irrigation systems, with responsibilities including operation and maintenance of dams, main channels and drainage systems of all irrigation systems, as well as of all the facilities in those systems that are not yet transferred to the WUAs. This transfer policy has been largely financed by international resources in coordination with the 10 Department of Irrigation Districts, under INDRHI. INDRHI is in the process of receding in its scope and operational responsibilities.

Finally, INDRHI collaborates with other sectoral institutions such as: (i) the State Secretariat for Agriculture and the Dominican Agriculture Institute, (ii) the Water Supply and Sanitation "Institute" INAPA, a utility operating in small towns and rural areas, and regional water and sanitation utilities in the cities of Santo Domingo, Santiago, Moca, Puerto Plata and Romana, (iii) the Ministry of Public Health, and (iv) the Dominican Electricity Corporation.

=== Water Users Organizations and Irrigation Management Transfer Program ===
The Irrigation Management Transfer Program (IMTP) shift responsibility for the administration, operation and maintenance (O&M) of irrigation infrastructure to WUAs while remaining state-owned. The IMTP, still under implementation, has not been accompanied by a legal framework to promote further development of WUAs, their management practices (both administrative and commercial terms), and water management efficiency.

There are 28 Irrigation Users Boards (Juntas de Regantes-WUB) representing 71,800 water users (of a total of 89,300) covering 4.3 million tareas (15.9 tareas = 1 ha). The WUB are in charge of fee collection, operation, administration, budget preparation and expenditures. WUBs are composed of Water Users Associations (Asociaciones de Regantes- WUA) and are legally considered non-profit organizations. Contrary to some WUBs, which have received extended support from IMTP, WUAs have weaker organization.

Irrigation District	Juntas de Regantes (WUB)	Asociaciones (WUA) (#)	Tareas (15.9 tareas = 1 ha)	Users (#)
Alto Yaque del Norte	Ulises Francisco Espaillat	10	392,336	5,827
Alto Yaque del Norte	Monsieur Bogaert	5	211,040	2,416
Alto Yaque del Norte	Mao	8	171,360	1,775
Bajo Yaque del Norte	General Fernando Valerio	7	374,848	4,014
Bajo Yaque del Norte	Horacio Vasquez	5	180,416	2,146
Bajo Yaque del Norte	Dajabon	4	49,744	1,090
Yuna-Camu	Camu	6	91,840	1,494
Yuna-Camu	Rincon	3	133,920	1,421
Yuna-Camu	Hatillo	5	195,152	1,598
Yuna-Camu	Yuna	6	61,548	1,286
Yuna-Camu	Constanza	6	44,660	1,575
Yuna-Camu	Jarabacoa	2	9,056	415
Bajo Yuna	Aglipo	8	124,128	3,152
Bajo Yuna	Boba	5	47,041	2,461
Bajo Yuna	Aglipo II	4	83,520	1,541
Bajo Yuna	Limon del Yuna	4	123,344	1,394
Bajo Yuna	Villa Riva	2	78,160	3,160
Bajo Yuna	Nizao-Valdiviesa	12	299,349	4,495
Del Este	Nisibon-Yuma	5	28,500	422
Del Este	General Gregorio Luperon	4	37,680	581
Del Este	La Esperanza	4	142,576	1,008
Del Este	Independent Association	1	21,733	303
Azua Valley	Ysura	11	331,102	8,430
Azua Valley	Padre las Casas	5	42,000	786
San Juan Valley	Valle de San Juan	6	256,352	6,180
San Juan Valley	Independent Association	1	63,136	800
San Juan Valley	Independent Association	1	35,857	857
Enriquillo	Neyba	9	267,808	4,733
Enriquillo	Tamayo	10	353,184	4,012
Yaque del Sur	Pedernales	4	10,064	241
Yaque del Sur	Yaque del Sur	9	163,088	4,153

Source: INDRHI

=== Key Legal Issues that Arise in Irrigation PPPs ===
Several legal and commercial issues will affect how these projects move forward and are structured. While some legal issues are not confined to irrigation PPPs, they can take on new dimensions and complexity when applied to irrigation: land ownership, water extraction, and the public sector counterpart. These will be key issues in a PPP as the private provider will want to ensure a steady revenue stream.

There are also the usual legal considerations that need to be checked when developing PPPs in any sector, such as legal restrictions on the type of PPP arrangement that can be entered into, relevant procurement rules for entering into PPPs, existence of restrictions on foreign investment, taxation and potential for tax holidays and the ability to assign rights such as security and step-in rights to lenders.

== Economic aspects ==
=== Agriculture and economic growth ===
See also:Economy of the Dominican Republic
The Dominican Republic's economy has shifted from an agriculture-based economy to a diversified economy in which services, commerce, industry, and tourism play a greater role. Agriculture's contribution to Gross Domestic Product (GDP) has declined since 1962, when it represented 32%, to only 13% in 2008. Of this value, 53% corresponds to livestock, fisheries and forestry. In 2000, crop production accounted for 5% of total GDP and had a total value of U.S. $1,053 million at current prices. Agriculture, however, maintains an important role in exports and employment. Irrigated agriculture contributes to this, accounting for nearly half of total production. Production on irrigated land has reached a record high, but this is mainly due to area expansion rather than a marked rise in productivity. The rural population accounts for 40% of the total population, and 52% of it is poor.

=== Water tariff ===
Annual fees for irrigation services are low (varies from US$4.75/ha in some regions to US$24/ha for a farmer with less than 10 ha not cultivating rice). Water costs for a farmer only represent 0.21 to 0.58% of total production cost. Operation and Maintenance expenditure in INDRHI's Irrigation Districts for 1997 was US$6.24 million (US$35/ha), while revenues from water fees were only 14% of this value. Water fees are obviously too low to meet maintenance and operation requirements.

=== External cooperation ===
In May 2008 the World Bank has approved a US$80 million loan to restore and strengthen irrigation, electricity, water, and sanitation infrastructure damaged by Tropical Storms Olga and Noel, enhance critical infrastructure to reduce future storm-related impacts, and strengthen basic capacity for future risk management in INDRHI and CDEEE.

== Dominican Republic’s irrigation model: the road ahead ==
According to FAO, despite IMTP's success in developing WUB's capacities, some areas within the program still need improvement. Those areas can be summarized as follows: (i) institutional capacity building has not been systematic. Follow-up on existing support for WUAs has been concentrated only on certain issues, without due attention to certifying their organizational development and achievements; (ii) capacitation has not adequately included administrative skills, business-like attitude, social and environmental topics; (iii) efforts have been concentrated on the WUBs, leaving the WUAs with little support to strengthen the capacities as organizations; (iv) irrigation infrastructure is usually transferred in poor shape, demanding large investments; and (v) stronger legal support is needed for the transfer process.

The challenge ahead cannot be faced with the existing policies and institutional settings. FAO considers deep institutional reform and policy framing the most pressing need. The government is trying to reorient the state's role in WRM and reduce dependency on governmental financing. The proposed Water Law introduces the National Water Commission as the regulatory authority for Water, to which entities responsible for regulating the different subsectors of water services (water supply to the population, irrigation and hydropower) will be assigned. This means INDRHI will focus on regulating irrigation services, where the WUA will be operating the irrigation systems.

== See also ==
- Water resources management in the Dominican Republic
- Water supply and sanitation in the Dominican Republic
- Electricity sector in the Dominican Republic
