= Santo Domingo Greenbelt =

The Santo Domingo greenbelt (Spanish: Cinturon Verde de Santo Domingo) is a greenbelt project that surrounds the outer boundaries of the capital of the Dominican Republic, Santo Domingo (Distrito Nacional). Most of the greenbelt is located in the Santo Domingo Province which encloses and surrounds the National District (DN). The greenbelt makes part of a project to protect parklands around the capital. It is divided into eight protected zones:

- A. Rio Haina (Haina River Area)
- B. Arroyo Guzman (Guzman Stream)
- C. Arroyo Manzano (Manzano Stream)
- D. Rio Isabela (Isabela River Area)
- E. Rio Ozama (Ozama River Area)
- F. Los Humedales
- G. Arroyo Cachon (Cachon Stream)
- H. Zona Oriental (Oriental Zone)

== Endangerment ==
Many zones that are protected are being affected by over-urbanization and lack of law enforcement. Most of the poor population in the DN live in the surroundings of Ozama River and Isabela River which causes pollution problem and lack of control. As a result, much of the project today is in danger for the exception of a few parts. Arroyo Manzano is increasingly being sub-urbanized due to population pressure.
