= Bao-Tavera Dams =

Bao-Taveras Dams
- Location within the Dominican Republic
- Official name: Complejo Taveras-Bao
- Country: Dominican Republic
- Location: Santiago, Santiago Province
- Coordinates: 19°18′37.41″N 70°44′37.23″W
- Purpose: Power, municipal water, irrigation
- Status: Operational
- Construction began: 1969
- Opening date: Bao: 1981; 45 years ago Tavera: 1973; 53 years ago
- Owner: Dominican Hydroelectric Generation Company

Dam and spillways
- Type of dam: Embankment, earth-fill
- Impounds: Bao: Bao River; Taveras: Yaque del Norte
- Height: Bao: 113 m (371 ft); Tavera: 82 m (269 ft)
- Length: Bao: 425 m (1,394 ft)
- Dam volume: Bao: 2,380,152 m^{3} (3,113,121 cu yd); Tavera: 1,700,000 m^{3} (2,200,000 cu yd)
- Spillways: 1
- Spillway type: Controlled chute, six radial gates
- Spillway capacity: Tavera: 6,860 m^{3}/s (242,000 cu ft/s)

Reservoir
- Total capacity: Bao: 280,000,000 m^{3} (230,000 acre⋅ft); Tavera: 170,000,000 m^{3} (140,000 acre⋅ft)
- Catchment area: 785 km^{2} (303 mi^{2})
- Surface area: Bao: 5.8 km^{2} (2.2 mi^{2}); Tavera: 4.5 km^{2} (1.7 mi^{2})

Tavera Hydroelectric Station
- Coordinates: 19°19′30.06″N 70°44′12.07″W
- Commission date: 1992
- Turbines: 2 x 48 MW Francis-type
- Installed capacity: 96 MW

The Bao-Tavera Dam Complex refers to two earth-filled embankment dams located about 15 km (9.3 mi) south of Santiago in Santiago Province of the Dominican Republic. The Bao Dam on the Bao River is 113 m (371 ft) and withholds a reservoir with a maximum storage capacity of 280,000,000 m^{3} (230,000 acre⋅ft). It is the second tallest dam in the country behind the Monción Dam. The Tavera Dam, about 8 km (5.0 mi) east of Bao Dam, on the river Yaque del Norte is 82 m (269 ft) high and has a reservoir with a capacity of 170,000,000 m^{3} (140,000 acre⋅ft). A 1.5 km (0.93 mi) canal connects each reservoir, making them a complex. The purpose of the complex is to provide municipal water, water for irrigation and to generate hydroelectric power. Water from the Tavera Reservoir is piped downstream to the Tavera Hydroelectric Plant which is situated on the right bank of the Bao River before it meets the Yaque del Norte River. The power station contains two 48 MW Francis turbine-generators for an installed capacity of 96 MW. Construction on the Tavera Dam began in September 1969 and it was completed on 27 September 1973. The Bao Dam was completed in 1981. The power station was upgraded from 80 MW to 96 MW in 1992.

== See also ==
- List of dams and reservoirs in Dominican Republic
