= WUA =

WUA may refer to:

- IATA code for Wuhai Airport, China
- Water user associations
- Workers and Unemployed Action
- World Umpires Association
