= Duarte Bridge =

Suspension bridge over the Ozama River in Santo Domingo, Dominican Republic

Juan Pablo Duarte Bridge Puente Juan Pablo Duarte
- View of the Duarte Bridge over the Ozama River
- Coordinates: 18°29′10.67″N 69°52′57.84″W
- Carries: Four one-way lanes (west to east) of DR-3, from Avenida 27 de Febrero to Avenida de las Américas
- Crosses: Ozama River
- Locale: Santo Domingo (Distrito Nacional and Santo Domingo Este), Dominican Republic
- Other name(s): Duarte Bridge; formerly Radhamés Bridge
- Owner: Dominican state
- Maintained by: Ministry of Public Works and Communications (MOPC)
- Next upstream: Juan Bosch Bridge
- Next downstream: Floating Bridge

Characteristics
- Design: Suspension bridge
- Material: Steel
- Height: 55 m (180 ft) (towers)
- Longest span: 175.5 m (576 ft)

History
- Opened: 17 December 1955

Location
- Interactive map of Juan Pablo Duarte Bridge

The Juan Pablo Duarte Bridge (Spanish: Puente Juan Pablo Duarte), commonly known as the Duarte Bridge, is a suspension bridge over the Ozama River that links the Distrito Nacional with the municipality of Santo Domingo Este in Santo Domingo, Dominican Republic. It opened on 17 December 1955, under the dictatorship of Rafael Trujillo, as the Radhamés Bridge (Puente Radhamés), and was renamed after the fall of the regime. It is a single-span, two-tower suspension bridge and today carries traffic in one direction only, from west to east, while the neighbouring Juan Bosch Bridge carries it the other way.

== Location ==
The bridge crosses the lower Ozama, near its mouth. It connects the southern end of Avenida 27 de Febrero in the Distrito Nacional with Avenida de las Américas in Santo Domingo Este, and forms part of the DR-3 corridor. The Juan Bosch Bridge runs parallel to it, on its northern side.

== History ==
=== Background ===
The first bridge over the Ozama opened on 28 April 1878 under Ulises Heureaux and was built of iron and wood. A flood washed it away, and the drawbridge that replaced it was destroyed by Hurricane San Zenón in 1930. Trujillo had a bridge rebuilt in 1933.

=== Construction and opening under Trujillo ===
Work on the bridge began in 1953 and ended in 1955. It opened on 17 December 1955, coinciding with the Fair of Peace and Brotherhood of the Free World (Feria de la Paz y Confraternidad del Mundo Libre), the large event with which the Trujillo regime marked its 25th anniversary in power. It was named the Radhamés Bridge after Radhamés Trujillo, one of the dictator's sons, the same name given at the time to the La Fe neighbourhood. The press has described it as the crowning work of the regime, and it became the main access between the colonial city and the eastern zone.

After the collapse of the dictatorship, the bridge was renamed in honour of Juan Pablo Duarte, founding father of the Dominican Republic.

=== Damage and repairs (1965–2003) ===
The bridge was damaged in the fighting of the Dominican Civil War of April 1965 and was repaired by Joaquín Balaguer. According to the newspaper El Nacional, it received another refit in 1970, and in 1997 a complete overhaul was ordered. Since February 1998, 30 km (19 mi) of new cables had been stored on the east side of the bridge, and in late 2003 they were reported to be damaged. At that time the bridge was closed for repairs, and traffic was diverted around the structure on the advice of engineers from the Conde-Mouchel consortium, which was in charge of the works.

To ease traffic during the planned temporary closure of the bridge to replace its cables, the government of Leonel Fernández installed the floating bridge over the Ozama in 1998. Conceived as an emergency measure to last three months, it was still in use almost three decades later.

=== Opening of the Juan Bosch Bridge and one-way operation ===
The opening of the Juan Bosch Bridge in December 2001, built to relieve congestion on the Duarte Bridge, allowed the latter to be used only in the west-to-east direction, while the new bridge would serve the opposite direction.

=== Deterioration and recent repairs (2022–2026) ===
On 15 July 2022, the Ministry of Public Works and Communications (MOPC) began replacing the bridge's expansion joints, with a planned duration of 60 days. Minister Deligne Ascención said the bridge carried 35,500 vehicles a day between 6:00 a.m. and 8:00 p.m. The MOPC handed the bridge back on 2 November 2022, after three months of work, 48 days behind schedule and at a cost of around RD$60 million.

The joints soon failed again. On 10 December 2022 the bridge was closed to repair them; between 17 and 20 March 2023 it was fully closed because of adhesion problems, at the request of the contractor, Proyectos Industriales, S. A. (Pinsa); and a third repair took place on 28 and 29 April 2023. The MOPC ordered Pinsa to carry out the repairs at no cost to the state and imposed administrative sanctions on those responsible. Later, citizens again warned of deterioration in several of its expansion joints.

In September 2026 the MOPC announced a structural strengthening programme that includes technical and vulnerability studies for work on the Juan Bosch and Juan Pablo Duarte bridges.

== Design ==
The Duarte Bridge is a steel suspension bridge with a single suspended span of 175.5 m (576 ft) and two towers 55 m (180 ft) high.

== Direction and lane layout ==
Since the opening of the Juan Bosch Bridge, the Duarte Bridge has operated in one direction only, from west to east, that is, from the Distrito Nacional towards Santo Domingo Este. It has four lanes running from Avenida 27 de Febrero to Avenida de las Américas: three general-purpose lanes and one lane exclusive to the Las Américas Tunnel. During the morning peak, a contraflow lane has also been set up for traffic towards the Distrito Nacional.

== See also ==
- Juan Bosch Bridge
- Ozama River
