= Juan Bosch =

Juan Bosch may refer to:

- Juan Bosch (politician) (1909–2001), Dominican politician and the first democratically elected president of the Dominican Republic
  - Juan Bosch bridge, named after him
  - Juan Bosch metro station, named after him
- Juan Bosch (film director) (1925–2015), Spanish film director and screenwriter
