= Mauricio Báez Bridge =

Maurcio Báez Bridge
- Coordinates: 18.500726°N 69.337454°W
- Carries: Main Road #4 (Bypass of San Pedro de Macorís)
- Crosses: Higuamo River, Dominican Republic
- Locale: near San Pedro de Macorís, Dominican Republic
- Official name: Puente Mauricio Báez
- Other name: Puente Higuamo or Puente Báez
- Maintained by: SEOPC

Characteristics
- Design: Cable-stayed bridge
- Total length: 613.8 m
- Longest span: 390 m

History
- Designer: Mario de Miranda (bridge engineer)
- Opened: Friday January 19, 2007

Location
- Interactive map of Maurcio Báez Bridge

The Mauricio Báez Bridge is a cable-stayed bridge on the Higuamo River near San Pedro de Macorís in the Dominican Republic. With a total length of 613.8 m (2,014 ft) and a main span of 390 m (1,280 ft), it was the cable-stayed bridge in the Caribbean, when it opened in 2007. It was designed by Studio De Miranda of Italy, and constructed by the Mera group. It is named after Dominican labor leader Mauricio Báez.

== Planning and construction ==
The Mauricio Báez Bridge is a cable-stayed bridge on the Higuamo River near San Pedro de Macorís. The construction of the bridge commenced in 1999, and the bridge was inaugurated on 19 January 2007 by president Leonel Fernández. It was designed by the Italian firm Studio de Miranda Associati and the construction was carried out by the Mera group. It was built at a cost of RD$1 billion (around US$30 million). The bridge is named in honour of Mauricio Báez (1910–1950), a prominent Dominican labour leader. The bridge was temporarily closed in September 2021, for carrying out maintenance work and for relaying of the asphalt surface.

== Technical characteristics ==
The bridge has a total length of 613.8 m (2,014 ft). It is a cable stayed bridge on a semi-fan arrangement. It was the largest cable-stayed bridge in the Caribbean at the time of its opening. The main span is a steel-concrete composite while the approach viaducts are made of reinforced concrete. There are five spans, with the central span measuring 390 m (1,280 ft), and other spans measuring 37.3 m (122 ft) each. It carries six lanes of road traffic.
