= Yaque del Norte River =

River in the Dominican Republic

Yaque del Norte
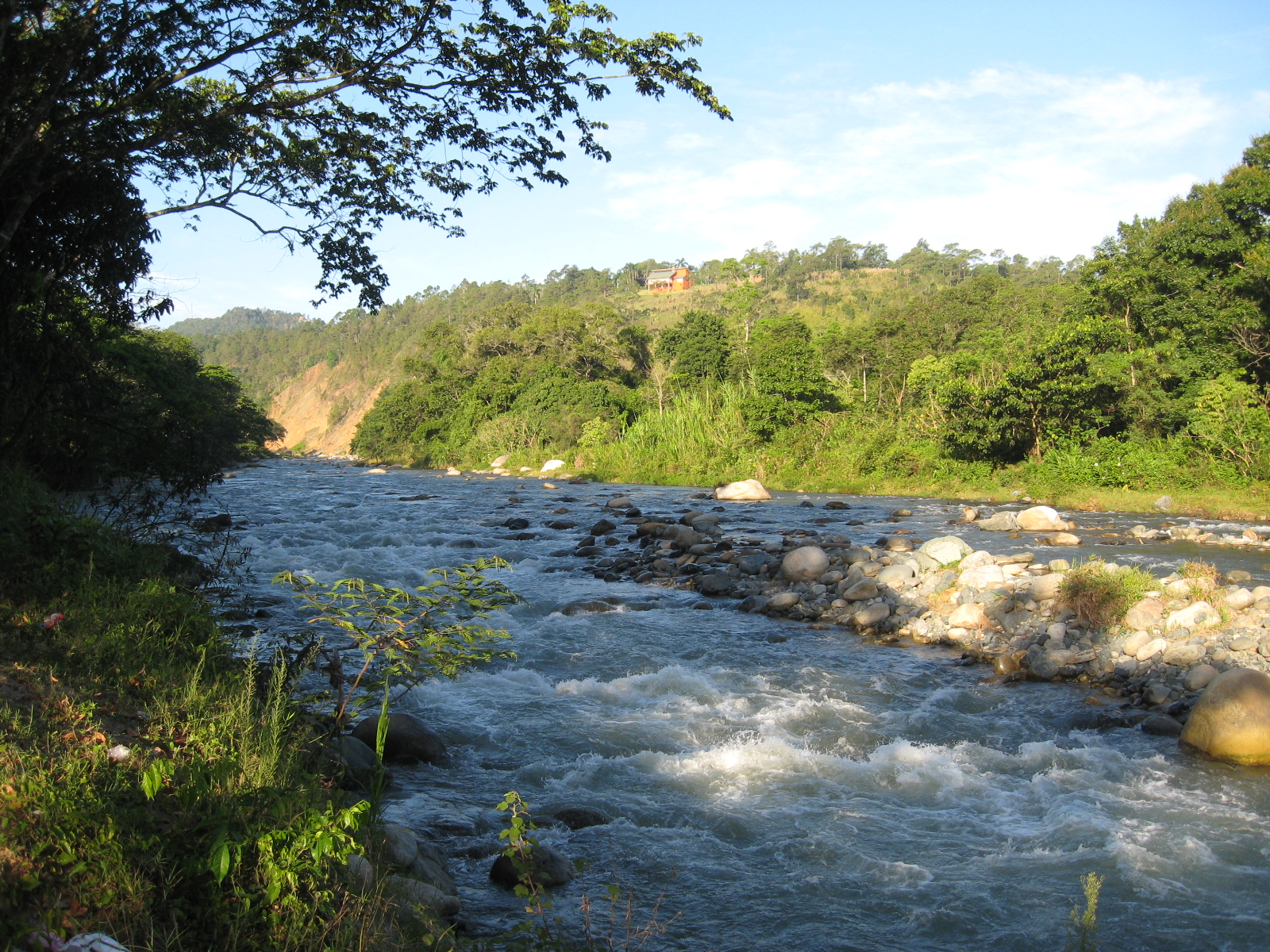
- Rio Yaque del Norte, Dominican Republic

- Location of mouth

Location
- Country: Dominican Republic
- Provinces: La Vega, Santiago, Valverde, Santiago Rodríguez, Monte Cristi
- Major cities: Santiago de los Caballeros, Mao, Jarabacoa, Guayubín, Monte Cristi, Castañuelas

Physical characteristics
- Mouth: Atlantic Ocean
  - coordinates: 19°50′24″N 71°41′13″W
- Length: 298 km (185 mi)
- Basin size: 7,044 km^{2} (2,720 sq mi)

Basin features
- Tributaries
  - left: Bao, Ámina, Mao, Guayubín, Guanajuma, Jagua
  - right: Jimenoa, Inoa, Maguaca, Maguá, Pananao, Jicomé

The Yaque Del Norte River (Spanish, Río Yaque del Norte) is the longest river in the Dominican Republic, as well as the second longest river on Hispaniola, behind the Artibonite River. It is 296 km long and flows northwest into the Atlantic Ocean.

== Etymology ==
Yaque or Yaqui was a Taíno word given to two rivers in the Dominican Republic. One is called the Yaque del Norte ("Northern Yaque"), and goes to the north of Hispaniola, emptying in the Atlantic Ocean; and the second, the Yaque del Sur ("Southern Yaque") goes to the south, emptying in the Caribbean Sea.

== History ==
During his first visit to Hispaniola in 1492, Christopher Columbus saw the river at its mouth, and he called it Río de Oro ("Golden River") because he found many small pieces of gold. During his second visit, he saw the river elsewhere, confusing it for a different one, and called it Río de las Cañas ("River of Canes") because many tall sugarcanes grew on the borders of the river.

Columbus built three forts near the river: Esperanza, Magdalena and Santiago. The first two were abandoned, and Santiago was moved to another place, with the name of Santiago de los Caballeros. Later, Santiago de los Caballeros was moved again near the river, where the modern city stands today.

== Course ==
The source of the Yaque del Norte is at an elevation of 2,580 metres, on the Pico del Yaque mountain, in the central part of the Cordillera Central mountain range. There, the river is called Los Guanos or Río de la Derecha ("River to the Right"). The name Yaque del Norte is used only when it is joined by another small river, Los Tablones or Río de la Izquierda ("River to the Left") in Manabao, to the west of Jarabacoa, at an elevation of 900 m.

From Manabao, the river flows to the east, through the northwestern part of La Vega Province. When it gets to Jarabacoa, it turns to the north, to Santiago Province. The Jimenoa river joins it at Jarabacoa.

In Santiago de los Caballeros, the river turns to the northwest and flows by the Yaque del Norte Valley, the western part of the Cibao Valley.

Its mouth is on Monte Cristi Bay, just to the south of the city of Monte Cristi, and empties into the Atlantic Ocean.

=== Tributaries ===
Its main tributaries are the Bao, Ámina, Mao and Guayubín rivers.

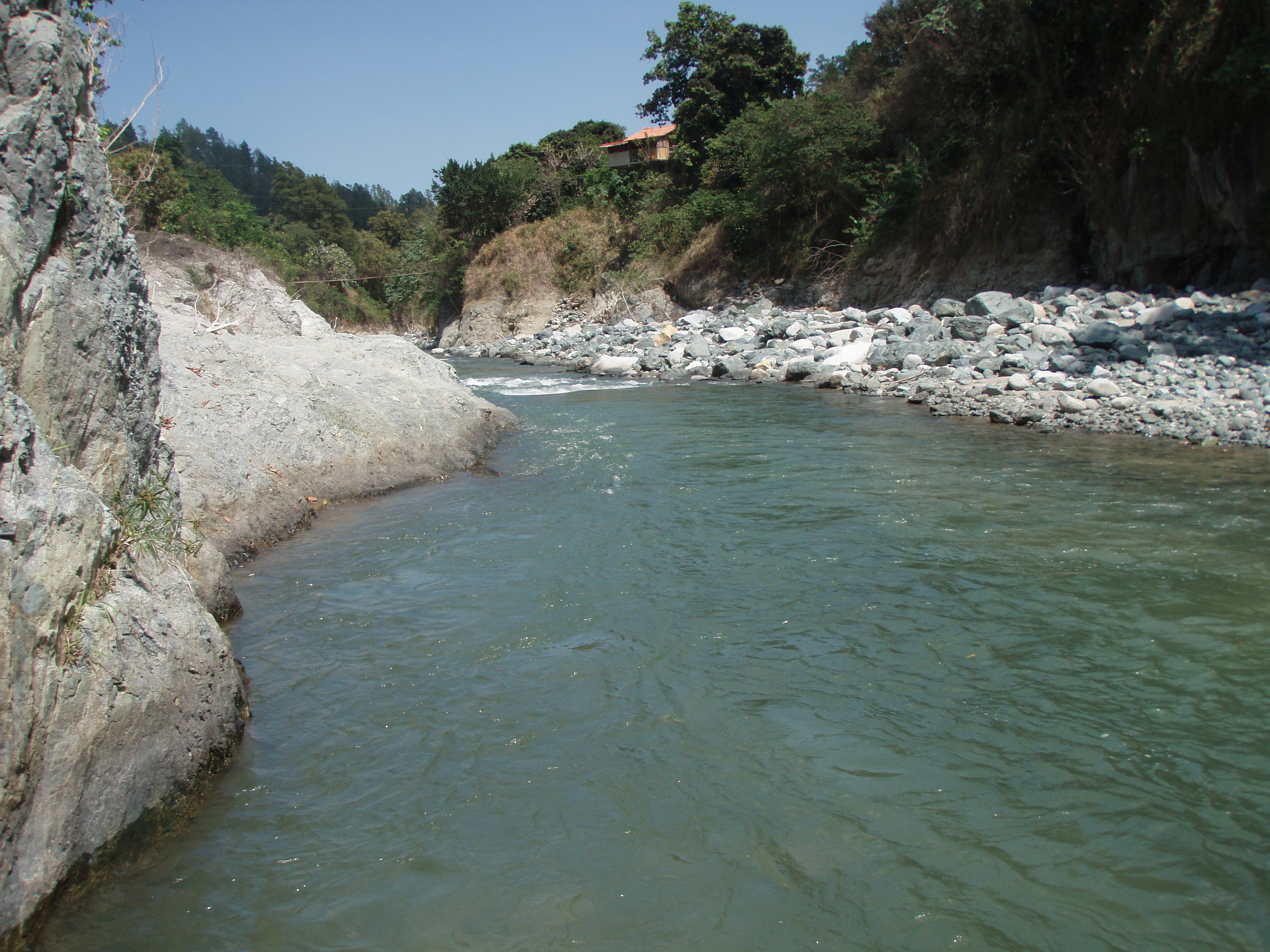
Yaque Del Norte River

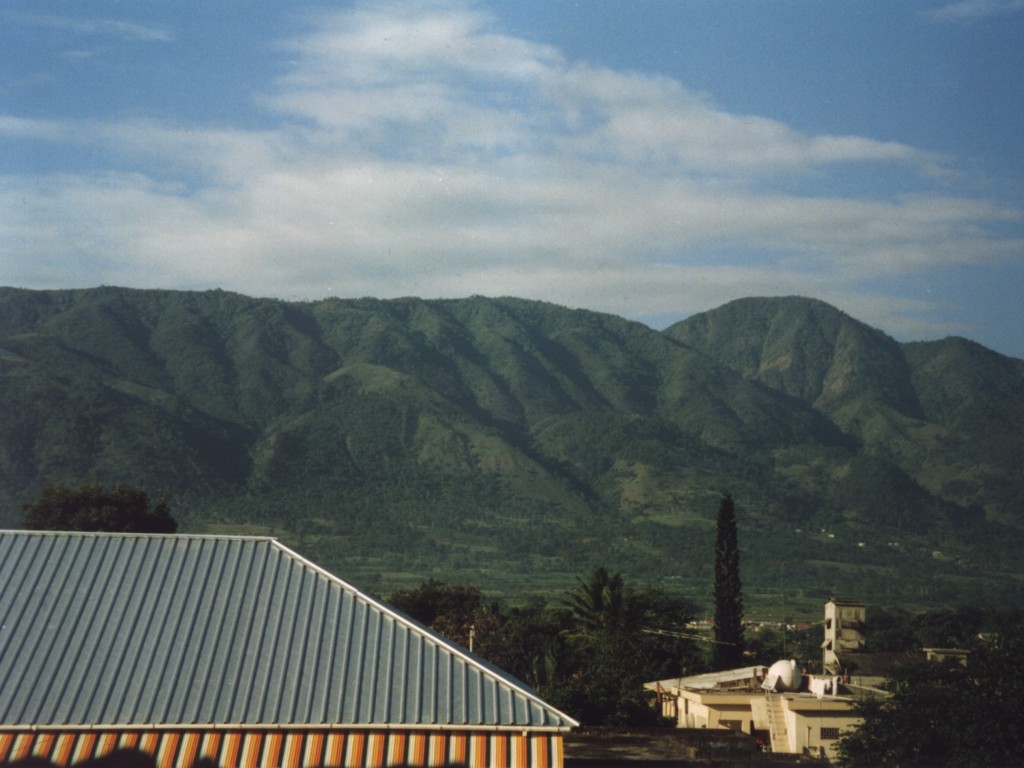
Cordillera Central, the highest mountain range in the Dominican Republic

== Cities ==
The city of Santiago de los Caballeros is the most important Dominican city close to the river. It goes also near the cities of Jarabacoa, Mao, Guayubín, Castañuelas and Monte Cristi.

== Watershed ==
With an area of 7,044 km^{2}, its watershed is the largest of the Dominican Republic, and the second largest of the island. Its discharge (volume of water which passes through a section of the river per unit of time) is 97.0 cubic metres per second at Palo Verde, to the southeast of Monte Cristi.

== Environment ==
Due to factory dumping, water mismanagement, and damming, the Yaque Del Norte is currently very polluted; it is very diminished in size, and lacks fish throughout much of its course. American crocodiles (Crocodylus acutus) once inhabited the Yaque del Norte and other rivers of Hispaniola, but now they are found only in the large lakes of the island (Lago Enriquillo and Etang Saumâtre).

== Uses ==
The water of the river is used for irrigation, mainly in the valley that goes from Santiago to Monte Cristi, the Yaque del Norte Valley. Crops grown include rice, bananas, plantains, cassava, tobacco, and vegetables.

The Yaque Del Norte is mostly shallow, so navigation is limited to small boats. During the wet season, however, the river swells up considerably, causing floods in some places. Since 1972, its waters have been dammed to harness electricity at the Tavera Dam.

There are several dams along the river to generate electricity, store the water for irrigation, and prevent flooding. The river is 298 km long, is the drainage basin for the north-west of the country, and is economically important as a source of irrigation for rice-farming and other agriculture.

== See also ==
- List of rivers of the Dominican Republic
- List of rivers of the Americas by coastline
