= Pedernales River (Hispaniola) =

River in Hispaniola

Coordinates: 18°02′N 71°44′W

Location
- Countries: Dominican Republic; Haiti

The Pedernales River is a river that forms the southernmost part of the international boundary between the Dominican Republic and Haiti.

== See also ==
- List of rivers of the Dominican Republic
- List of rivers of Haiti
