= Juan Bosch Bridge =

Cable-stayed bridge over the Ozama River in Santo Domingo, Dominican Republic

Juan Bosch Bridge Puente Juan Bosch
- View of the Juan Bosch Bridge, looking west
- Coordinates: 18°29′12″N 69°52′57″W
- Carries: Six lanes of DR-3, and pedestrian walkways
- Crosses: Ozama River
- Locale: Santo Domingo (Santo Domingo Este and Distrito Nacional), Dominican Republic
- Official name: Puente Presidente Juan Bosch
- Owner: Dominican state
- Maintained by: Ministry of Public Works and Communications (MOPC)
- Next upstream: Francisco del Rosario Sánchez Bridge
- Next downstream: Duarte Bridge

Characteristics
- Design: Cable-stayed bridge
- Material: Reinforced concrete
- Total length: 648.1 m (2,126 ft)
- Width: 33.5 m (110 ft)
- Height: 63 m (207 ft) (towers)
- Longest span: 180 m (590 ft)
- No. of spans: 5
- Clearance below: 35 m (115 ft) (maximum)

History
- Designer: Carlos Fernández Casado
- Constructed by: Consortium of FCC Construcciones, Dragados, Obras y Construcciones and Construcciones Civiles y Marítimas S.A.
- Construction cost: More than RD$600 million
- Opened: 19 December 2001

Location
- Interactive map of Juan Bosch Bridge

The Juan Bosch Bridge (Spanish: Puente Juan Bosch) is a cable-stayed bridge of reinforced concrete that crosses the Ozama River and links the municipality of Santo Domingo Este with the Distrito Nacional in Santo Domingo, Dominican Republic. It opened on 19 December 2001 and is named after the writer, politician and former president Juan Bosch.

The bridge was built to relieve congestion on the adjacent Duarte Bridge, and it is one of the main links between the historic centre of the capital and the eastern part of Greater Santo Domingo. Its design is notable for the relatively low height of its towers, chosen to harmonize with the silhouette of the neighbouring bridge.

== Name ==
The official name of the structure, "Presidente Juan Bosch", was given by Law No. 71-02, which designates the bridge parallel to the Juan Pablo Duarte Bridge over the Ozama River and which the National Congress passed on 18 December 2001, the day before the opening. In the press it also appears as the "Profesor Juan Bosch Bridge".

== Location ==
It is one of seven bridges crossing the Ozama River in the city of Santo Domingo. It stands at 18°29′12″N 69°52′57″W, near the river's mouth and parallel to the Duarte Bridge, on its northern side. It connects the Distrito Nacional, home to the city's historic centre, with the municipality of Santo Domingo Este.

The bridge forms part of the DR-3 corridor, which links Santo Domingo with the eastern region of the country. At its western end it connects with Avenida 27 de Febrero and at its eastern end with Avenida de las Américas.

== Background ==
Until the late 20th century, the Duarte Bridge, completed in 1955, was the main crossing over the lower Ozama for traffic between the two banks. The growth of the capital and its vehicle fleet, particularly in the eastern zone, led to recurring saturation of the structure, with heavy rush-hour traffic jams that spilled over onto the other bridges across the river.

Traffic on the Duarte Bridge had reached 80,000 vehicles a day, so a new structure was planned with a capacity of about 183,000 vehicles a day.

== Design and characteristics ==
=== Concept ===
To blend in with its surroundings, the bridge was conceived to respect the silhouette of the Duarte Bridge. However, rather than repeat the same structural type, a cable-stayed design was chosen, since the span to be crossed, 180 m (590 ft), was too short to justify a suspension bridge. Its towers are also the same height as those of the existing bridge, which is unusually low for a cable-stayed bridge. The database Structurae classifies it as a cable-stayed bridge with a semi-fan cable arrangement.

The project was designed by engineer Leonardo Fernández Troyano of the Spanish firm Carlos Fernández Casado.

=== Dimensions and structure ===
The bridge has a total length of about 648 m (2,126 ft) and is divided into three sections: the east access viaduct, the main bridge and the west access viaduct, measuring 233 m (764 ft), 346.9 m (1,138 ft) and 68.2 m (224 ft) respectively.

Longitudinal view of the bridge

Its deck reaches a maximum height of 35 m (115 ft) above the river, while its towers are 63 m (207 ft) tall. In total it has 15 spans: the access viaducts are made up of 25 m (82 ft) spans, while the main bridge has five spans of 36 m (118 ft), 47.5 m (156 ft), 180 m (590 ft), 47.5 m (156 ft) and 36 m (118 ft), the central one crossing the river. The deck is 33.5 m (110 ft) wide, originally divided into four traffic lanes, two lanes reserved for a future urban rail line, and pedestrian walkways, and it is supported by 48 double stays spaced 10 m (33 ft) apart. Today all six lanes are used for road traffic.

=== Foundations ===
The bridge has 14 piers. Ten are founded on spread footings, while the other four had to be founded on micropiles. The towers, each with two pylons, also rest on spread footings.

== Construction ==
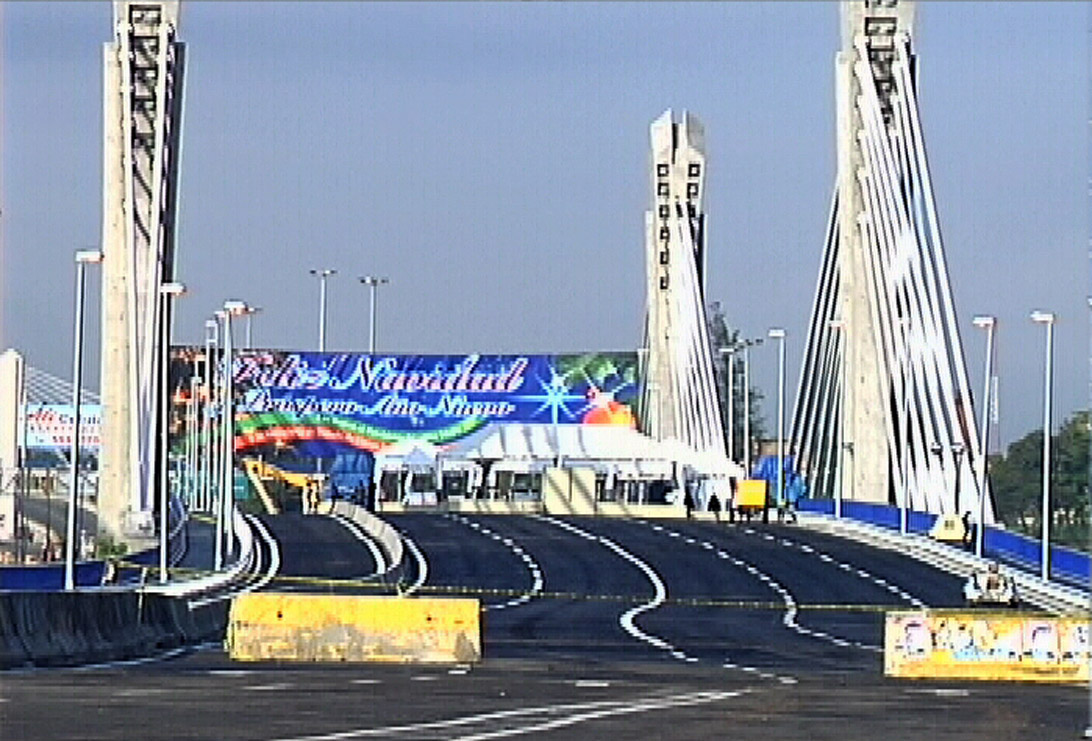
The Juan Bosch Bridge in December 2001, shortly before its opening

The project was promoted by the Secretariat of State for Public Works and Communications. Work began in 1998 under the government of Leonel Fernández and was carried out by a consortium of FCC Construcciones, Dragados, Obras y Construcciones and Construcciones Civiles y Marítimas S.A.

=== Construction method ===
The side spans, which lie over land, were built on temporary falsework. The main span, by contrast, crosses a river about 150 m (490 ft) wide and had to be built by cantilevering in segments 5 m (16 ft) long, supported by the stay cables. The access viaducts consist of simply supported spans built with precast girders 25 m (82 ft) long.

=== Cost and opening ===
The project required an investment of more than RD$600 million.

The bridge was opened on 19 December 2001 by President Hipólito Mejía, and is the first cable-stayed bridge over the Ozama River.

== Later history ==
=== Early deterioration and expansion joints (2006–2020) ===
In December 2006, the Senate of the Dominican Republic passed a resolution asking the executive branch to order a thorough investigation into the bridge's construction, which showed visible deterioration in its protective areas, and to determine the responsibility of the construction firm for alleged defects in its steel structure.

According to engineer Teodoro Tejada, a former president of the Dominican College of Engineers, Architects and Surveyors (CODIA), in July 2012 the contractor Odebrecht installed new expansion joints, as the previous ones had deteriorated with time. In October 2020, the Ministry of Public Works and Communications (MOPC) reported a temporary repair of cracks in the joints, whose deterioration was affecting vehicles using the bridge.

=== Structural assessments (2015–2016) ===
In 2015, a paper presented at the 13th Latin American and Caribbean Conference for Engineering and Technology (LACCEI) assessed the structural condition of the bridge and its components through inspections.

In May 2016, as part of the Study of Structural Reliability of Bridges in the Dominican Republic ("Estudio de Confiabilidad Estructural de Puentes en República Dominicana") carried out by the Instituto Tecnológico de Santo Domingo with the backing of the Ministry of Higher Education, Science and Technology and the National Fund for Scientific and Technological Innovation and Development (FONDOCYT), a network of wireless sensors with accelerometers was installed at key points of the bridge to analyze the effect of traffic on the structure.

=== Expansion joint replacement (2021) ===
On 28 May 2021 the MOPC began replacing the bridge's expansion joints, whose advanced deterioration caused flat tyres and damage to vehicles' front suspensions. Before the work began, a deputy minister for road maintenance said that the bridge's cables were in perfect condition. The work, awarded to the company Proyectos Industriales, S. A. (Pinsa), lasted 45 days in three 15-day stages, with support from the National Institute of Traffic and Land Transportation (INTRANT) and the traffic police (DIGESETT), who set up contraflow lanes and alternative routes.

Six joints of the Transflex type (models 400 and 900), made by Trelleborg, were installed, with an estimated service life of 15 years and a total cost of RD$48 million, which according to the MOPC benefited about 897,000 users. The wearing course was also repaved and the road markings renewed. Minister Deligne Ascención handed over the work on 22 July 2021.

=== Structural strengthening (2026) ===
In September 2026 the MOPC announced a structural strengthening programme for the country's four busiest bridges, including technical and vulnerability studies for work on the Juan Bosch and Duarte bridges. The plan also includes a new bascule bridge over the Ozama River, awarded for about US$75 million, and the relocation of the floating bridge.

== See also ==
- Duarte Bridge
- Francisco del Rosario Sánchez Bridge
- Ozama River
