= Soco River =

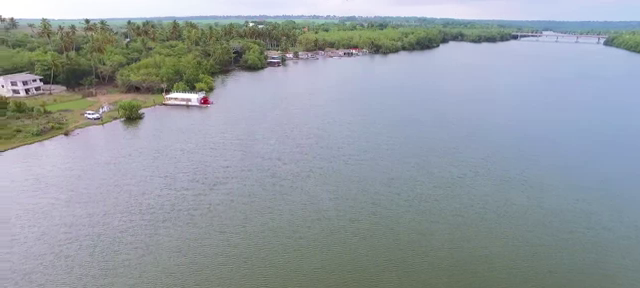
- Native name: Rio Soco (Spanish)

Location
- Country: Dominican Republic

Physical characteristics
- Mouth: Caribbean Sea
  - coordinates: 18°27′03″N 69°12′16″W

The Soco River (Spanish: Río Soco) is a river of the Dominican Republic.

== See also ==
- List of rivers of the Dominican Republic
