= Water user board =

A Water User Board (WUB), or Water User Association (WUA) is a group of water users, such as irrigators, who pool their financial, technical, material, and human resources for the operation and maintenance of a water system. A WUA usually elects leaders, handles disputes internally, collects fees, and implements maintenance. In most areas, WUA membership depends on one's relationship to a water source (such as groundwater or a canal).

Local Water User's Boards are widely used to manage irrigation in Peru, and are increasingly used to manage irrigation in the Dominican Republic, although with mixed results.

== Characteristics of enduring, Self-governing WUAs ==
Political scientist Elinor Ostrom has identified seven important characteristics of organizations which manage common resources well:

- Clearly defined boundaries. The membership of the institution must be well defined. It must be clear who has legitimate access to the resource, who is under the authority of the association, and who the “others” are that must be prevented from access. Additionally, the boundaries of the resource must be defined. In the case of WUAs, the membership would likely be all landowners that receive water from a main canal and the resource would be the flows. This is known as a hydrologic organizing structure. However, some groups choose to organize in ways more familiar to their culture. There are cases of organization by village or kinship which also have had success.
- Appropriation, rule, and local conditions congruence. It is necessary for the resource appropriations and rules to be adapted to a local area. Ostrom stresses that it is not specific rules which are necessary for strong institutions but rather rules to which the members agree. Rules made by locals will inevitably make sense with local conditions.
- Collective-choice. It is necessary that all members have the opportunity to play a role in changing the rules. All those directly affected (i.e. irrigators) should be able to voice their opinions and vote. While officials are elected to execute duties, the real authority rests with the general assembly of water users.
- Monitoring. In order for all users to make a credible commitment to one another and fully cooperate, they must know their fellow users are not stealing. Monitoring may take the form of water guards or more sophisticated gages.
- Graduated sanctions. Penalties for those breaking the rules of the organization must be imposed by the members (or an elected board). The penalties should be commensurate with the infraction and could even lead to expulsion from the WUA. Such severe penalties deter users from attempting to steal.
- Conflict-resolution mechanisms. One of the beauties of WUAs is the ability to handle disputes on the local level. This avoids the tortuous legal processes in the judicial system and adds to the accountability among the group. The members are apt to make equitable decisions for disputes knowing they may be in a similar situation in the future.
- Minimal recognition of right to organize. Members must have the ability to organize without being challenged by external government authorities. In other words, they must be given true authority over their resource and the members in it.

WUA are fundamentally a participatory, bottom-up concept. Though they have existed for centuries, they have received particular attention in recent decades as a development tool. WUAs have been organized in developing countries as diverse and distant as Thailand, Brazil, Turkey, Somalia, and Nepal among others.
