= Monción Dam =

- Location within the Dominican Republic
- Official name: Presa Monción
- Country: Dominican Republic
- Location: Monción, Santiago Rodríguez Province
- Coordinates: 19°24′19.95″N 71°7′8.82″W
- Purpose: Power, irrigation
- Status: Operational
- Opening date: 2001; 25 years ago
- Owner: Dominican Hydroelectric Generation Company

Dam and spillways
- Type of dam: Embankment, earth-fill clay-core
- Impounds: Mao River
- Height: 119 m (390 ft)
- Dam volume: 2,890,000 m^{3} (3,780,000 cu yd)
- Spillway capacity: 5,750 m^{3}/s (203,000 cu ft/s)

Reservoir
- Total capacity: 370,000,000 m^{3} (300,000 acre⋅ft)
- Surface area: 11.2 km^{2} (4.3 mi^{2})
- Normal elevation: 280 m (920 ft)

Monción Hydroelectric Station
- Coordinates: 19°25′36.35″N 71°5′28.48″W
- Commission date: 2002
- Turbines: 2 x 26 MW Francis-type
- Installed capacity: 52 MW

The Monción Dam is an earth-fill embankment dam on the Mao River near Monción in Santiago Rodríguez Province of the Dominican Republic. At 119 m (390 ft) tall, it is the highest dam in the country and the Caribbean. The purpose of the dam is to produce hydroelectric power and supply water for irrigation. The dam's power station is located downstream and contains two 26 MW Francis turbine-generators for an installed capacity of 52 MW. The dam was completed and began filling its reservoir on 22 September 2001. Its power station was commissioned on 27 April 2002.

== See also ==
- List of dams and reservoirs in Dominican Republic
