= San Juan River (Dominican Republic) =

Coordinates: 18°40′N 71°04′W

Location
- Country: Dominican Republic

The San Juan River is a river of the Dominican Republic.

== See also ==
- List of rivers of the Dominican Republic
