= Water supply and sanitation in the Dominican Republic =

Water supply and sanitation in Dominican Republic
Data
- Access to an improved water source: 86% (2010)
- Access to improved sanitation: 83% (2010)
- Share of collected wastewater treated: 49% (2000)
- Continuity of supply: 10%
- Average urban water use (L/person/day): 450
- Average urban water and sanitation tariff (US$/m^{3}): $5/month (1990–1998)
- Share of household metering: Low
- Annual investment in WSS: $14/capita (1991-1998 average)
- Share of self-financing by utilities: Very low

Institutions
- Decentralization to municipalities: Partial
- National water and sanitation company: Yes, limited to small towns
- Water and sanitation regulator: None
- Responsibility for policy setting: Presidency of the Republic
- Sector law: None
- No. of urban service providers: 6

The Dominican Republic has achieved impressive increases in access to water supply and sanitation over the two decades prior to 2010. However, the quality of water supply and sanitation services remains poor, despite the country's high economic growth during the 1990s.

== Access ==
In 2015, around 1.6 million people lacked access to "improved" water and 1.7 million lacked access to "improved" sanitation. In the Dominican Republic, 84% of the total population had access to "improved" water, 86% of the urban population and 81% of the rural population. As for sanitation, 84% of the total population, 86% and 76%, urban and rural respectively, had access to "improved" sanitation.

In 2010 the Dominican Republic, with a population of 8.8 million, of which about 60% were located in urban areas, had a relatively high level of access to water supply and sanitation, although access in some regions and among the poor remained insufficient.

	Urban (60% of the population)	Rural (40% of the population)	Total
Improved water source	87%	84%	86%
Improved sanitation	87%	75%	83%

Source: WHO/UNICEF Joint Monitoring Programme for Water Supply and Sanitation (2010) based on a trend extrapolation from the results of six Dominican Republic Demographic and Health Surveys conducted between 1986 and 2007 as well as a Multiple Indicator Cluster Survey conducted in 2000.

There are substantial regional differences in coverage for water. For example, in nine provinces located in the Central, Northeastern and Eastern part of the country less than 70% of the population had access to an improved source of water supply according to the 2002 census. Poor households exhibit lower levels of access: only 56% of poor households are connected to water house connections as opposed to 80% of non-poor households. Just 20% of poor households have access to sewers, as opposed to 50% for the non-poor.

== Service quality ==
Despite decentralization efforts and continued government support, quality and continuity of service are inadequate in the Dominican Republic. Water scarcity is increasing mainly due to excessive consumption in urban areas, a lack of demand management (low tariffs, low share of metering, limited environmental consciousness) and watershed degradation. Watershed degradation occurs mainly in the lower sections of most coastal basins and is a result of unplanned settlements and activities and lack of sanitation services.

=== Continuity ===
Continuity of services (%)

	By system	By serviced population
Continuous service	40%	10.5%
Intermittent service	60%	89.5%

=== Drinking water quality ===
Various factors affect the water quality in the Dominican Republic, including: poor condition of purification systems, minimal operational controls, low level of maintenance of treatment plants, and mostly intermittent systems. 38.4% of water systems have no chlorination system installed. These are mostly smaller systems in rural areas. The fact that a chlorination system exists is not a guarantee that water is actually properly disinfected.

National chlorination coverage

	Urban	Rural	National
Water systems with chlorination systems	87.3%	57.4%	61.4%
Water systems without chlorination systems	12.7%	42.6%	38.4%

According to 2002 figures by the service providers only 73.6% of drinking water quality samples showed satisfactory drinking water quality, as measured by the absence of total coliforms, compared to a standard of 95%. The presence of coliforms as such is not a health hazard, but that the presence of coliforms is an indicator of the potential presence of pathogens.

=== Wastewater treatment ===
In 2000 the WHO estimated that 49% of collected wastewater in the Dominican Republic received some kind of treatment. This percentage, while much higher than the average for Latin America and the Caribbean at that time (15%), is still considered insufficient.

== Pollution ==
The depletion of groundwater and the unregulated disposal of wastewater and solid waste are creating problems that might become irreversible. The numerous new communities around urban areas and large hotels usually do not have adequate sanitation.

== History and recent developments ==
During the 1950s and 1960s the water and sanitation sector in the Dominican Republic experienced an abrupt decentralization and subsequent re-centralization. Since 1962, the institutional framework has remained relatively stable, with a gradual process of regionalization to the provinces with the largest cities of the country. In the period since 1980, which was characterized by economic growth fueled primarily by a massive inflow of tourists, substantial investments were made and service coverage increased significantly.

=== Decentralization and Recentralization (1955-62) ===
Under the government of Rafael Trujillo (1930–1961) water service provision was first provided centrally through the General Directorate of Water Systems (Dirección General de Acueductos) in the Ministry of Public Works and Irrigation (Secretaría de Fomento, Obras Públicas y Riego). However, in 1955 all responsibilities and assets were transferred to the city councils (Ayuntamientos), a model which failed by 1962. The government of President Joaquín Balaguer thus created INAPA through Law 5994 on July 30, 1962, again administering all water systems centrally.

=== Gradual establishment of regional water and sewer companies (1973-1998) ===
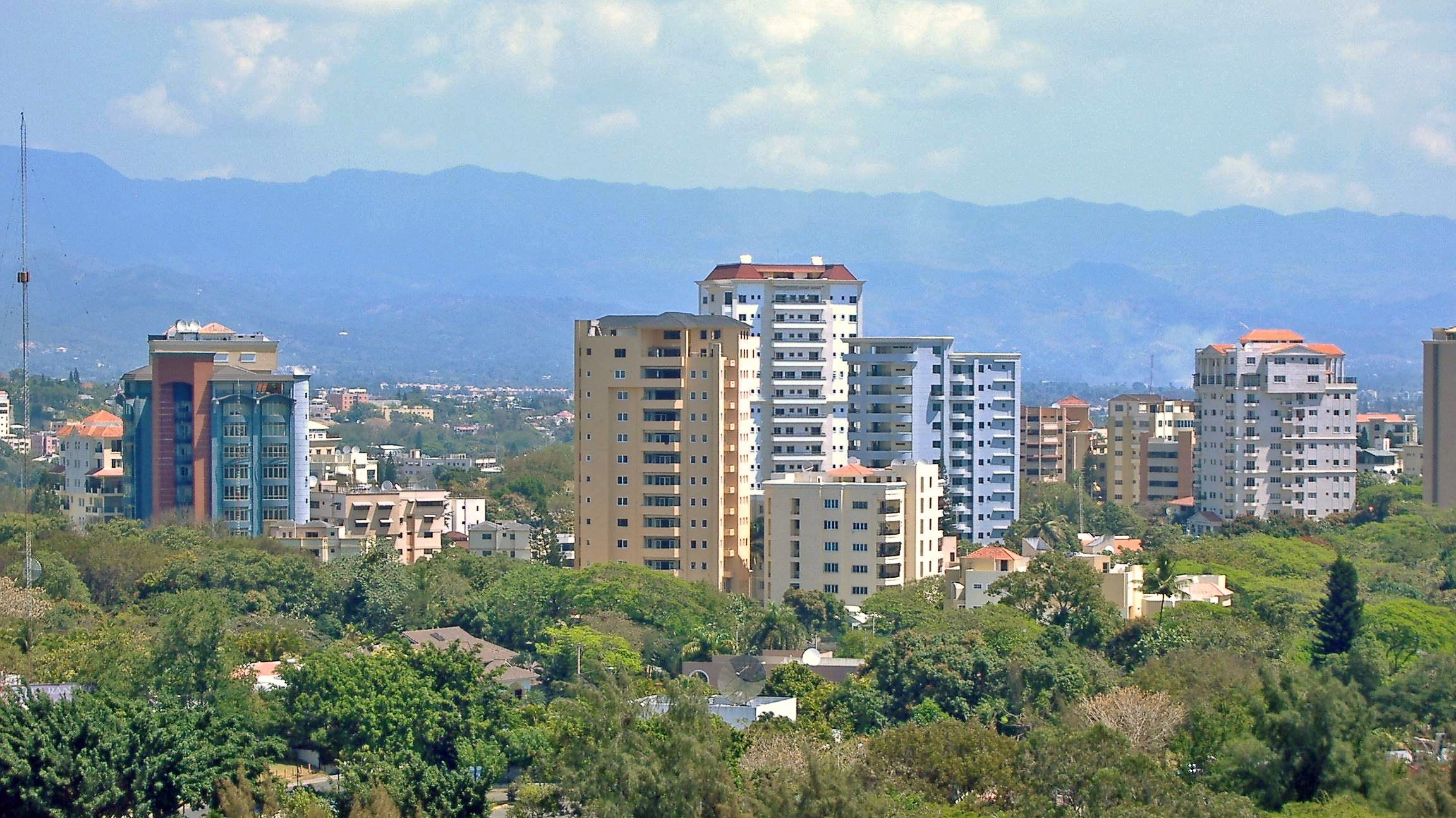
Santiago, the second city of the Dominican Republic.

In 1973, under the second Presidency of Joaquín Balaguer (1966–1978), CAASD was set up in the capital Santo Domingo as the first regional water and sewer company. This was followed by the creation of CORAASAN in the second largest city of the country, Santiago, in 1977. The regionalization process then stalled for two decades. But at the request of Congressmen representing their respective constituencies, the process of regionalization resumed and in 1997-98 laws were passed creating three additional regional water and sewer companies in Puerto Plata, Moca and Romana. At the same time, INAPA embarked on its own decentralization programme, handing over the operation of rural water supply systems to community-based organizations. These efforts were supported by technical assistance from USAID (see below).

The 1990s under the third Presidency of Joaquín Balaguer (1986–1996) and the first Presidency of Leonel Fernández (1996–2000) witnessed substantial investments in water and sanitation and an important increase in coverage. For example, access to house connections in rural areas increased from 35% in 1990 to 62% in 2004. Access to sewer connections in urban areas increased from 47% in 1990 to 65% in 2004. These increases are among the highest in Latin America and the Caribbean during that period.

=== Stalled reform efforts (1999–2004) ===
In 1999 the Inter-American Development Bank (IDB) approved an important US$71 million loan to consolidate the reform and modernization of the water and sanitation sector. The loan foresaw the financing of investments by INAPA and regional companies, as well as substantial technical assistance. Specifically, it aimed at transforming the five regional water companies outside the capital into commercially operated entities with no political interference in day-to-day management and strong representation of municipalities and civil society in their Boards. The reform was based on the model of CORAASAN. In the case of CORAAMOCA and COAAROM, management contracts with private operators were to be signed. INAPA was to be gradually decentralized into autonomous regional units, and services in rural areas were to be gradually transferred to user associations. A condition for the effectiveness of the loan was the passing by Congress of a water and sanitation framework law that would have established a central government agency (ente rector) in charge of the sector as well as a water and sanitation regulatory agency.

Under the Presidency of Hipólito Mejía (2000–04), the water and sanitation law was debated in Congress in 2002 and again in June 2004, but was ultimately not passed. The IDB loan thus did not become effective. When Leonel Fernández became again President (2004–12) he has not taken the initiative to revitalize the stalled reform process.

=== Private sector service contracts in Santo Domingo (2001 onwards) ===
The government undertook steps to involve the private sector in water and sanitation. In 2001 CAASD signed two service contracts for the installation of meters, meter reading, billing and collection, one for the Eastern and one for the Western part of its service area in Santo Domingo. The contract for the Western part was awarded to the Colombian company AAA, which increased the share of metering from 1% to 25% and increased collected revenues by 128% in less than two years.

== Responsibility for water supply and sanitation ==
=== Policy and regulation ===
Policy and regulatory functions in the water and sanitation sector in the Dominican Republic are highly fragmented:

- The Secretariado Técnico de la Presidencia is in charge of setting policies.
- Drinking water quality regulation is the responsibility of the Secretariat of Public Health (Secretaria de Salud Publica) through its State Secretariat of Public Health and Social Security (SESPAS)
- Environmental regulation is shared between the State Secretariat of the Environment and Natural Resources (Secretaria de Estado de Medio Ambiente y Recursos Naturales), which determines the limits of residual waste and controls activities, and the National Institute of Hydraulic Resources (INDRHI), which regulates concessions for all use and preservation of water.
- The General Directorate of Norms and Systems Quality (DIGENOR) approves quality norms in the sector.

No entity is specifically in charge of sanitation and there is no policy on sanitation. According to a 2006 evaluation for USAID, the Dominican Republic is one of the few countries in Latin America where sanitation is managed by a Public Health State Secretariat that is not coordinated with the rural potable water programs. This, together with the weakness of the Environmental Health Directorate in the Public Health Secretariat, has caused latrine and sanitary education programs to be weak or abandoned.

There is no economic regulatory agency for the sector. The absence of a national strategy for water and sanitation is considered a constraint to sector development. Without a clear strategy, there is a lack of direction and no apparent separation of roles among the active sector agencies. This results in overlapping responsibilities and sometimes conflicting activities.

=== Service provision ===
Water and sewer services are provided by regional companies in the largest cities, the national water and sewerage authority (INAPA) in other cities and towns, as well as by community-based water boards in rural areas.

The regional water and sanitation companies were established over a period of 25 years, each by its own law. Each company covers one Province. Their general directors are appointed by the President of the Republic, thus showing a continuity of centralized decision-making in the presence of regional companies. Besides this similarity, the governance structure (such as the composition and function of their Boards) of each regional company is different. The regional companies are:

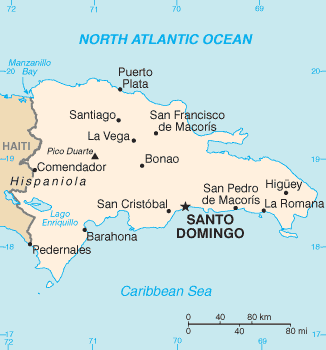
Map of the Dominican Republic

- The Santo Domingo Water and Sewerage Corporation (CAASD), which serves approximately 2.2 million people in the national district of Santo Domingo and three municipalities of the surrounding Santo Domingo Province. CAASD is a public service company with autonomous character created by Law 498 on April 13, 1973. CAASD's highest authority is a Council of Directors consisting of six members, including the general director of CAASD, the mayor of Santo Domingo, the Director of INDRHI and the Director of INAPA.
- The Santiago Water and Sewerage Company (CORAASAN) services over 750,000. The autonomous public corporation was created in 1977 by Law 520.
- The Puerto Plata Water and Sewerage Company CORAAPPLATA in Puerto Plata Province, which was created by Law 142 of July 1997 and started operations in 2001.
- The Moca Water and Sewerage Compamny (Corporación del Acueducto y Alcantarillado de Moca - CORAMOCA) in Espaillat Province, created by Law 89 of May 16, 1997.
- The Romana Water and Sewerage Company (Corporación de Acueducto y Alcantarillado de la Romana - CORAAROM) in La Romana Province, which was created by Law 385 of August 18, 1998.

About 4.4 million people, or half the population of the country, live in the five provinces and the national district of the capital served by the five regional water and sewer companies.

In rural areas, INAPA handed over the responsibility for the operation of water systems to community-based water associations (Asociaciones Comunitarias de Acueductos Rurales - ASOCAR) consisting of largely unpaid volunteers in domestic and foreign based nongovernmental organizations (NGOs).

== Efficiency (water losses) ==
Non-revenue water has been estimated at being higher than 65%. Currently, service providers produce 41,720 liters per second (LPS), which is an average of 907 liters per person and day (LPPD) before losses. Even after taking into account losses, water use is much higher than in Europe (220 LPPD) and the United States (300 LPPD). The tourism industry explains this high consumption to a large extent. The hotel industry uses 280% more than what other Caribbean countries use - 1,483 liters per guest and night.

== Financial aspects ==
=== Tariffs and cost recovery ===
Cost recovery for water and sanitation is minimal. Average tariffs are moderate at US$0.21 per cubic meter for water and US$0.07 per cubic meter for sewerage. Collection rates are extremely low at only 28%. As a result of moderate tariffs and very low collection rates, according to a WHO estimate in 1998, households paid on average only US$0.50 per month for water and US$0.09 per month for sewerage. Electricity bills of the utilities are directly paid for by the central government. The regional water and sewer companies and INAPA rely largely on subsidies from the central government using mechanisms that are not transparent and do not promote efficiency.

In rural areas, communities set their own water tariffs. However, the level of estimated operation and maintenance costs is usually not taken into account when setting tariffs. In rural areas, tariffs are flat rates independent of consumption since there are no meters. Tariffs in Hato Mayor Province were set at 10-25 Dominican Pesos (less than one USD) per month in 2006. Two communities near in an economically active area near Baní charge higher tariffs of between 20 and 500 Pesos per month, depending on the economic conditions of each household.

However, there were some improvements. In 2006 the revenues collected by the regional utility in Puerto Plata was 2.5 times higher than in 2002 due to tariff increases and better bill collection. This allowed the utility to generate a moderate surplus to contribute to the financing of investments. The utility has also signed a performance and financing agreement with the national government, providing more transparency and incentives to improve efficiency.

=== Investment and financing ===
A total of 84% of investments made between 1990 and 1998 went to urban centers, while only 16% went to the rural zones Average annual investments for potable water supply was US$87.9 million (1990–1998), which is a relatively high level of per capita investments compared to other developing countries. However, investments are not well allocated. For example, investments are biased towards water supply at the expense of improved sanitation and wastewater treatment, which received only 2.3% of total investments.

It has been argued that poor allocation of resources has resulted in lower increases in coverage rates than would be expected, given the levels of investments. Also, little coordination has been carried out by donors.

Investment financing comes mainly from the central government, with some modest contributions by some regional utilities from their own revenues.

== External support ==
The water and sanitation sector receives external support from international financial institutions such as the Inter-American Development Bank and the World Bank. It also received support from USAID in the past.

=== Inter-American Development Bank (IDB) ===
The IDB has played an important role in the sector through its reform and modernization program mentioned above. However, the program has been stalled for many years after Congress did not approve the water and sanitation reform law that was a condition for the program's effectiveness. In October 2010 the IDB approved a US$35m loan to support the Decentralization and Strengthening of INAPA.

=== United States ===
Since 1998 USAID has provided technical assistance to INAPA to introduce what it calls a Total Community Participation approach in rural water supply and sanitation. The project served as a laboratory for INAPA, whose activities in rural areas had been limited to water supply, to engage in community participation, in rural sanitation and hygiene promotion. USAID first supported a pilot project for nine rural communities with a total of 700 families in Hato Mayor Province with the support of Catholic Relief Services and a Dominican NGO. From 2002 onwards, USAID and the NGO Family Health International supported INAPA in replicating the approach in other parts of the country. A 2002 study was undertaken to see how NGO systems compared with INAPA and privately built systems. The study concluded that INAPA, the private sector and NGOs were all capable of building good systems. A 2006 evaluation showed that six of the nine pilot communities did not have working systems. The reasons include inappropriate design - pumps and inverters burned out - and the stealing of solar panels. However, the evaluation also showed that the community-based approach has been adopted by other stakeholders, such as CAASD for rural projects in the province of Santo Domingo, an INAPA project supported by Spanisch cooperation and the Peace Corps. One of the NGOs, Hermandad (HElping Reach MANy through Direct Assistance in Development) worked in the villages west of San Jose de Ocoa for many years developing water and sanitation systems and teaching improved health practices.

=== World Bank ===
In April 2009 the World Bank approved a US$34 million Water and Sanitation in Tourist Areas Project. Its main objective is the reduction of the high economic, environmental and social costs caused by wastewater and solid waste deficiencies, especially in tourist areas, and the improvement of the coverage and quality of the provision of water as well as the collection and disposal of wastewater and solid waste in the Dominican Republic. This would be achieved by: (i) supporting the development and implementation of a national water, wastewater and solid waste strategies in a coordinated way among government agencies and donors; (ii) improving water resources management and the quality, efficiency and sustainability of water and solid waste services; and (iii) increasing the coverage of water and solid waste services, especially to poor communities near tourist areas.

== See also ==
- Water resources management in the Dominican Republic
- Electricity sector in the Dominican Republic
