= Iguamo River =

Iguamo River Higuamo River
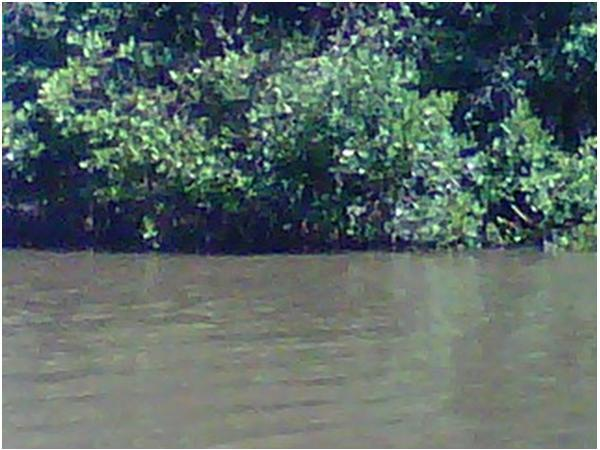

- Location of mouth
- Native name: Rio Iguamo (Spanish)

Location
- Country: Dominican Republic
- Municipality: San Pedro de Macorís

Physical characteristics
- Mouth: Santo Domingo Basin, Caribbean Sea
  - coordinates: 18°26′16″N 69°18′53″W

The Iguamo River (or Higuamo River) is a river in the Dominican Republic.

== See also ==
- List of rivers of the Dominican Republic
