= Jigüey Dam =

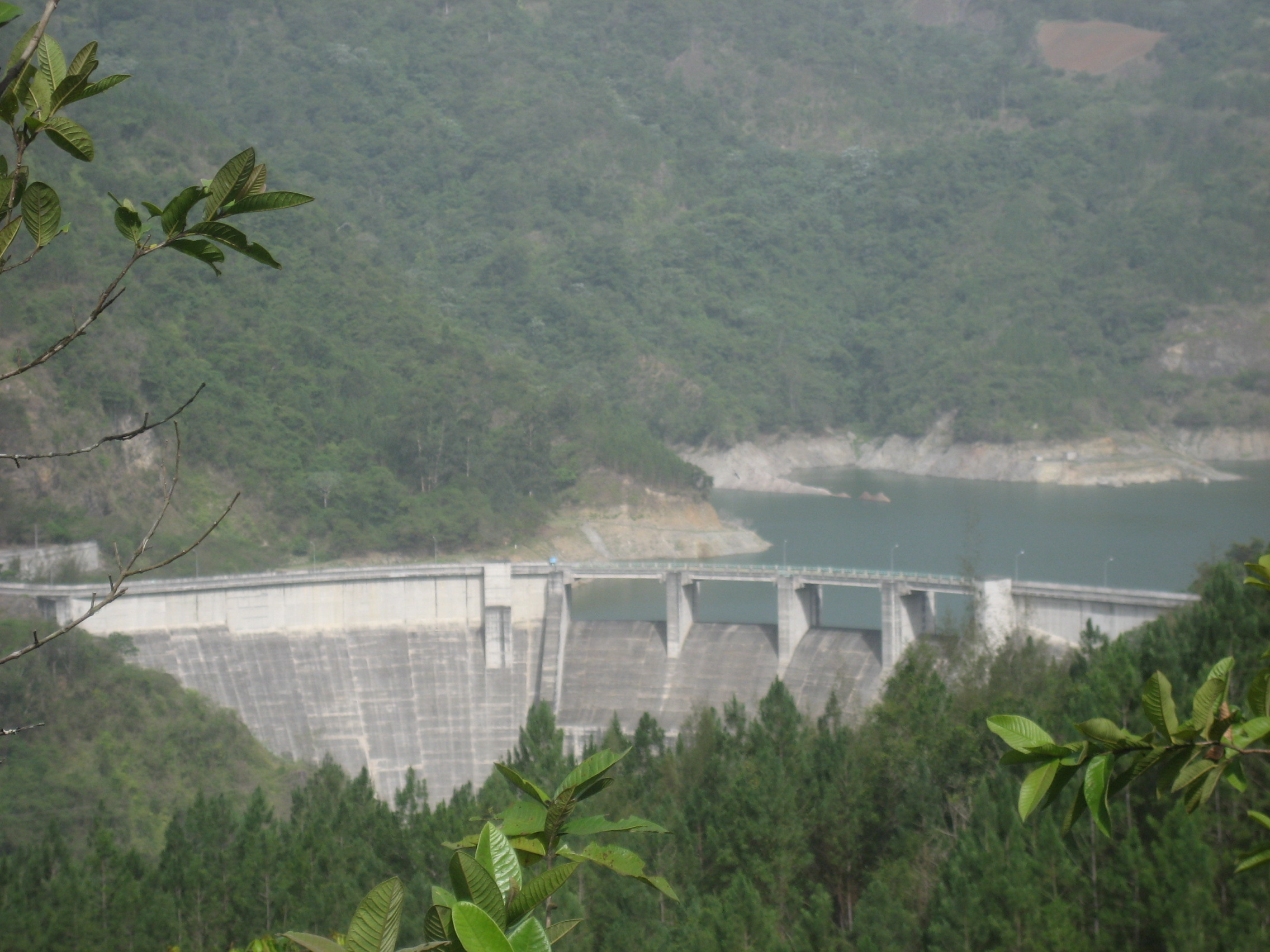
- Presa de Jiguey, Dominican Republic

- Location within the Dominican Republic
- Official name: Presa de Jigüey
- Country: Dominican Republic
- Location: San José de Ocoa Province
- Coordinates: 18°32′47.65″N 70°22′38.39″W
- Purpose: Power
- Status: Operational
- Opening date: 1992; 34 years ago
- Construction cost: US$500 million
- Owner: Dominican Hydroelectric Generation Company

Dam and spillways
- Type of dam: Arch-gravity
- Impounds: Nizao River
- Height: 110.5 m (363 ft)
- Spillway type: Crest, uncontrolled overflow
- Spillway capacity: 11,910 m^{3}/s (421,000 cu ft/s)

Reservoir
- Total capacity: 167,970,000 m^{3} (136,180 acre⋅ft)
- Active capacity: 130,950,000 m^{3} (106,160 acre⋅ft)
- Inactive capacity: 37,020,000 m^{3} (30,010 acre⋅ft)
- Catchment area: 887 km^{2} (342 mi^{2})
- Normal elevation: 541.5 m (1,777 ft)

Jigüey Hydroelectric Station
- Coordinates: 18°30′35.40″N 70°19′51.21″W
- Commission date: 1992
- Turbines: 2 x 49 MW Francis-type
- Installed capacity: 98 MW

The Jigüey Dam is an arch-gravity dam on the Nizao River about 32 km (20 mi) west of San Cristóbal in San José de Ocoa Province of the Dominican Republic. At 110.5 m (363 ft) tall, it is the third highest dam in the country. The purpose of the dam is to produce hydroelectric power and it supplies the largest hydroelectric power station in the country.

The dam diverts water through over 4.4 km (2.7 mi) of headrace pipe and penstock to the power station downstream. The power station contains two 49 MW Francis turbine-generators for an installed capacity of 98 MW. The dam was completed and its power station was commissioned 1992. It cost US$500 million to build and funding was provided by the host government.

== See also ==
- List of dams and reservoirs in Dominican Republic
