= Mao River =

Location
- Country: Dominican Republic

The Mao River is a river of the Dominican Republic. It is impounded by the Monción Dam.

== See also ==
- List of rivers of the Dominican Republic
