= Isabela River =

Coordinates: 18.5143°N 69.8981°W

- Location of mouth

Location
- Country: Dominican Republic

The Isabela River is a river of the Dominican Republic.

This rises in Loma Siete Cabezas in the Sierra de Yamasá, inland of the island and empties into the Caribbean Sea, crossing through the port of Santo Domingo.

== See also ==
- List of rivers of the Dominican Republic
