= Nizao River =

- Location of the mouth

Location
- Country: Dominican Republic

Physical characteristics
- Mouth
  - coordinates: 18.233°N 70.180°W

The Nizao River is one of the most important rivers in the Dominican Republic. Three hydroelectric power/electrical plants have been built along its path, the largest at Jigüey Dam. It is dried because of decade of aggregate extraction. Luis Carvajal, a top Dominican ecologist, estimated a cost of RD$350 million per kilometre to recover the river.

== History ==
On 14 April 1655 Robert Venables landed with a contingent of the English New Model Army at the mouth of the Nizao River in preparation for a land attack on Santo Domingo. Vice-Admiral William Goodsonn was also landed with an auxiliary "sea regiment", composed of sailors. Their superior discipline enabled them to save the other soldiers from catastrophe during two Spanish ambushes. After two attempted assaults, the siege was abandoned.
