= Electricity sector in the Dominican Republic =

Electricity sector of Dominican Republic

Data
- Electricity coverage (2006): 88% (total), 40% (rural); (LAC total average in 2007: 92%)
- Installed capacity (2006): 3,394MW
- Share of fossil energy: 86%
- Share of renewable energy: 14% (hydro)
- GHG emissions from electricity generation (2003): 7.63 Mt CO_{2}
- Average electricity use (2003): 1,349 kWh per capita
- Distribution losses (2005): 42.5%; (LAC average in 2005: 13.6%)
- Transmission losses (2006): 4.7%

Consumption by sector (% of total)
- Residential: 44% (2001)
- Industrial: 30% (2001)
- Commercial: 10% (2001)

Tariffs and financing
- Average residential tariff (US$/kW·h, 2005): 0.140; (LAC average in 2005: 0.115)
- Average industrial tariff (US$/kW·h, 2005): 0.146; (LAC average in 2005: 0.107)
- Average commercial tariff (US$/kW·h, June 2005): 0.231

Services
- Sector unbundling: Yes
- Share of private sector in generation: 86%
- Competitive supply to large users: Yes
- Competitive supply to residential users: No

Institutions
- No. of service providers: 10 main (generation), 1 (transmission), 3 (distribution)
- Responsibility for regulation: SIE-Electricity Superintendence
- Responsibility for policy-setting: CNE-National Energy Commission
- Responsibility for the environment: Ministry of the Environment and Natural Resources
- Electricity sector law: Yes (2001, amended 2007)
- Renewable energy law: Yes (2007)
- CDM transactions related to the electricity sector: 1 registered CDM project; 123,916 tCO_{2}e annual emissions reductions

The power sector in the Dominican Republic has traditionally been, and still is, a bottleneck to the country's economic growth. A prolonged electricity crisis and ineffective remedial measures have led to a vicious cycle of regular blackouts, high operating costs of the distribution companies, large losses including electricity theft through illegal connections, high retail tariffs to cover these inefficiencies, low bill collection rates, a significant fiscal burden for the government through direct and indirect subsidies, and very high costs for consumers as many of them have to rely on expensive alternative self-generated electricity. According to the World Bank, the revitalization of the Dominican economy depends greatly on a sound reform of the sector.

== Electricity supply and demand ==
=== Installed capacity ===
Electricity generation in the Dominican Republic is dominated by thermal units fired mostly by imported oil or gas (or liquefied natural gas). At the end of 2006, total installed capacity of public utilities was 3,394 MW, of which 86% was fossil fuels and 14% was hydroelectric. The detailed share for the different sources is as follows:

The large coal-fired Punta Catalina power plant has been accused of causing considerable soil, water and pollution, reportedly affecting the health and livelihoods of local residents.

Source	Installed capacity (MW)	Share (%)
Steam turbines	606.2	17.9%
Gas turbines	572.7	16.9%
Combined cycle	804	23.7%
Fuel oil engines	912	26.9%
Diesel oil engines	30	0.9%
Hydroelectricity	469.3	13.8%

Source: Electricity Superintendence Statistics, 2006

Total electricity generated in 2006 was 10.7 TWh. Generation experienced a 7.7% annual increase between 1996 and 2005. However, between 2004 and 2006, there has been an average annual decrease of about 10% in total electricity generated.,

==== Planned expansion ====
Currently, there are plans for the construction of two 600MW coal-fired plants, Montecristi and Azúa, by the private sector. It is also expected that, by 2012, an additional 762MW of hydroelectric capacity will have been added to the generation system. The first three hydropower plants with a combined capacity of 240MW are:

- Pinalito with 50 MW on the Rio Tireo and the Rio Blanco,
- Palomino with 99 MW at the confluence of the rivers Yaque Del Sur and Blanco, and
- Las Placetas with 87 MW, involving an inter-basin transfer from the Rio Bao to the Rio Jaguá

The two first plants are already under construction.

=== Alternative sources for self-generation ===
As a response to the electricity supply crisis (see crisis section below)., many consumers turned to alternative self-generation units such as small diesel generators, inverters, kerosene lamps or large power generators (for large industrial consumers). It is estimated that total installed capacity in 2006 was 5,518MW, which means that self-generation accounted for about 2,214MW, equivalent to 63% of the 3,394MW total capacity of public utilities and 38% of total installed capacity. The costs associated with this self-generation capacity are very high as they include equipment purchase, maintenance and fuel supply. This affects the residential, commercial and industrial sectors. For the latter, about 60% of its electricity consumption is self-generated.

=== Demand ===
Electricity demand in the Dominican Republic has grown considerably since the early 1990s, at a yearly average of 10% between 1992 and 2003. Consumption is very close to the regional average, with annual per capita consumption of 1,349 kWh in 2003. Total electricity sold in 2005 was 3.72 TWh. Demand has constrained supply (see crisis section below), which in turn is limited by subsidies (see subsidies below)

In 2001, the share of each sector in the electricity sold by the three distribution companies (EdeNorte, EdeSur and EdeEste) was as follows:

- Residential: 44%
- Commercial: 10%
- Industrial: 30%
- Public: 16%

==== Demand projections ====
Annual demand increase has been estimated at about 6% for the upcoming years.

== Access to electricity ==
Distribution networks cover 88% of the population, with about 8% of the connections thought to be illegal. Government plans aim to reach 95% total coverage by 2015.

== Service quality ==
Service quality in the Dominican Republic has suffered a steady deterioration since the 1980s. Frequent and prolonged blackouts result mainly from financial causes (i.e. high system losses and low bill collection) that are further aggravated by technical factors (i.e. unadequate investments in transmission and distribution). Poor service quality is also characterized by large voltage and frequency fluctuations.

=== Interruption frequency and duration ===
The transmission system in the Dominican Republic is weak and overloaded, failing to provide reliable power and causing system-wide blackouts. East-west and north-south transmission lines need to be reinforced in order to deliver electricity to the capital and northern regions and to transmit power from the new power plants in the eastern region.

=== Distribution losses ===
Distribution is the most dysfunctional element of the country's power system. Distribution losses in the Dominican Republic have historically been high and have increased even further in recent years. In 2005, the percentage of losses was 42.5%, up from 28.5% in 2002. This is far above the 13.5% average for LAC. Sustained poor service quality and relatively high prices have induced theft through illegal connections and non-payment of electricity bills. Recent data for 2007 show that only about 59% of power purchased by the distribution companies is eventually paid for by consumers (88% would be the target percentage for a well-managed distribution company). Although still very low, this percentage has shown an improvement up from about 52% in 2005.

== Responsibilities in the electricity sector ==
=== Policy and regulation ===
The National Energy Commission (Comisión Nacional de la Energía, CNE) is the policy agency, one of its main responsibilities being the elaboration of the National Energy Plan. The CNE presented in 2004 the National Energy Plan for the period 2004-2015 as well as the Indicative Plan of Electricity Generation (PIEGE) for the period 2006-2020.

The Electricity Superintendence (Superintendencia de Electricidad, SIE) is the regulatory agency, while the Coordination Agency (Organismo Coordinador, OC) was created to coordinate dispatch of electricity.

The Dominican Corporation of State Electricity Companies (Corporación Dominicana de Empresas Eléctricas Estatales - CDEEE) is a holding company that brings together all government-owned generation, transmission and distribution companies and associated government programs in the country. It consists of:

- Hydroelectricity Generation Company
- Electricity Transmission Company, ETED (Empresa de Transmisión Eléctrica Dominicana)
- Rural and Suburban Electrification Unit, UERS
- Blackout Reduction Program, PRA
- 50% of the North Distribution Company, EdeNorte
- 50% of the South Distribution Company, EdeSur
- the 50% government holding of the East Distribution Company, EdeEste

EdeNorte and EdeSur are entirely government-owned, the remaining 50% shares being held by the government's Enterprise Trust Fund, Fondo Patrimonial de las Empresas (FONPER). EdeEste is a mixed private-public company.

=== Generation ===
86% of generation capacity is privately owned (excluding self-generation), and 14% is publicly owned. Generation capacity is shared among the different companies as follows:

Company	Generation capacity (MW)	Share (%)	Geographic areas (north, south, east)
Haina (private) Basic Energy Ltd.	663.3	19.5%	N, S, E
Itabo (private)	630.5	18.6%	N, S, E
Hydroelectricity (public)	469.3	13.8%	N, S
Independent Power Producers (IPPs) (private)	515	15.2%	N, S, E
Unión Fenosa (private)	194.5	5.7%	N
CEPP (private) Basic Energy Ltd.	76.8	2.3%	N
Transcontinental Capital Corp. (private)	116.3	3.4%	S
Monte Rio (private)	100	2.9%	S
AES (private)	555	16.4%	E
Metaldom (private)	42	1.2%	S
Laesa (private)	31.4	0.9%	N
Total	3,394.1		

Source: Electricity Superintendence Statistics

=== Transmission ===
The transmission system, which is under the full responsibility of the state-owned company ETED (Electricity Transmission Company), consists of 940 km of 138kV single-line circuit lines that radiate from Santo Domingo to the north, east, and west.

=== Distribution ===
In the Dominican Republic, there are three distribution companies. The government owns two of them, EdeNorte and EdeSur, through the CDEEE (50%) and the Fondo Patrimonial de las Empresas (FONPER). It also maintains a 50% ownership of the third one, EdeEste, (the additional 50% is owned by the Trust Company of the West (TCW) which is operated by AES Corporation, its original buyer. The three companies serve a similar share of the market.

== Renewable energy resources ==
As it has been described, most electricity generation in the Dominican Republic comes from thermal sources. Only 14% of the installed capacity is hydroelectric, with this percentage falling to below 9% when all the thermal self-generation is accounted for. The exploitation of other renewable resources (i.e. solar, wind) is very limited. However, this situation is expected to change following the enactment of in May 2007 of the Law of Incentives to Renewable Energy and Special Regimes (Law No. 57-07). Among other incentives, this law establishes financing at favorable interest rates for 75% of the cost of equipment for households that install renewable technologies for self-generation and for communities that develop small-scale projects (below 500 kW).

=== Hydroelectricity ===
As it has been mentioned, Egehid's expansion plan contemplates the addition of 762MW of hydroelectricity capacity in the period 2006-2012. According to CDEEE, the first of the new series of dams and hydropower plants - Pinalito - is a "model of environmental management", with only 12 families resettled and extensive reforestation.

=== Wind ===
A 2001 study estimated that the Dominican Republic had a wind generation potential of 68,300GWh per year, equivalent to more than six times its current power production.

=== Solar ===
In March 2016, the 33.4 MW Monte Plata solar plant came online. The farm consists of 132,000 photovoltaic panels. It was built by Soventix Caribbean (www.soventix.energy), and there will be a proposed second phase consisting of 270,000 photovoltaic panels that would double the size of the plant to 69 MW.

In August 2018, the 57.98 MW solar park Montecristi Solar started its energy injection to the grid, and became the largest solar farm in the Caribbean with 214,000 photovoltaic panels. A second phase is planned to double the capacity to 116 MW.

In 2021, Girasol Solar Park was inaugurated and its currently the largest photovoltaic plant in the country and the Caribbean. It has a total installed capacity of 120 megawatts, which is estimated to produce 240,000 MWh per year.

Built on an area of 220 hectares, composed of 268,200 panels with solar position followers or “trackers” that rotate 104 degrees for twelve hours a day depending on the solar movement to guarantee greater use of irradiation, which translates into an increase in the effective capacity of the project. With an investment of approximately US$100 million, the park, located in the Yaguate municipality, San Cristóbal province, increased the national photovoltaic capacity by 50%.

In addition, the Girasol Solar Park will annually avoid the emission into the atmosphere of 150,000 tons of carbon dioxide (CO_{2}) and the import of 400,000 barrels of oil, contributing to mitigating the effects of climate change and representing savings in foreign currency, respectively.

== History of the electricity sector ==
=== The situation prior to the reforms ===
Prior to the 1990s reform, the Dominican power sector was in the hands of the state-owned, vertically-integrated Corporación Dominicana de Electricidad (CDE). The operation of the company was characterized by large energy losses, poor bill collection and deficient operation and maintenance. During the 1990s, the rapid growth in the power sector mirrored the high economic growth experienced by the country. Total electricity demand increased at an annual rate of 7.5% in the years 1992-2001, while annual GDP growth was 5.9%. Generation capacity was not enough to meet peak demand, which translated into continuous supply constrains and widespread blackouts lasting up to 20 hours. In the mid-1990s, in order to address generation capacity shortages, several Independent Power Producers (IPPs) where encouraged by the government to sign Power Purchase Agreements (PPAs) with the CDE. The result of these deals, often nontransparent and negotiated, was high electricity prices.

=== Sector reforms: 1997-2002 ===
==== Sector unbundling and privatization ====
The government, aiming to solve the enduring problems of the lack of available installed capacity and constant blackouts, enacted the Public Sector Enterprises Reform Law, which provided the framework for the privatization and restructuring of the power sector. In 1998-1999, under the first government of Leonel Fernández, the sector was unbundled and the vertically state-owned monopoly, Corporación Dominicana de Electricidad (CDE), was broken into a number of generation companies. EGE (Empresa Generadora de Electricidad) Haina and EGE Itabo, which ran the thermal plants, were privatized, and three distribution companies - EdeNorte (Empresa Distribudora de Electricidad), EdeSur and EdeEste - were created and also privatized.

An attempt had been made in 1997 to improve the functioning of the sector by strengthening sector regulation with the appointment of a new regulator, which was part of the Ministry of Commerce and Industry and thus had only limited autonomy.

==== Electricity Law of 2001 ====
A comprehensive regulatory framework was not enacted until July 2001, with the Electricity Law (Law 125-01)passed under the government of Hipólito Mejía. Under this law, the government's operational presence in the sector was to be through three entities:

- the formerly integrated utility CDE, which kept the contracts with the Independent Power Producers (IPPs);
- a transmission company, Empresa de Transmisión Eléctrica Dominicana (ETED); and
- a hydropower production company, Empresa de Generación Hidroeléctrica Dominicana (EGEHID).

A new holding company, Corporación Dominicana de Empresas Eléctricas (CDEE) was established to own ETED and EGEHID and to eventually substitute the CDE. Initially the government had intended to transfer its assets to manage the companies as an investment under a Trust Fund separate from the entities governing the sector, rather than using its ownership as a potential instrument for sector policy. However, this change was not implemented.

The 2001 Law and its supporting regulations from 2002 included the creation of an autonomous regulatory agency, the Electricity Superintendence (SIE). It also created the National Energy Commission (CNE) and a wholesale market under responsibility of a Coordinating Agency.

=== 2000s developments ===
==== The crisis and renationalization of distribution companies ====
The reform resulted in new generation facilities, which were built and financed by the private sector, and investment in distribution by the privatized companies. Thanks to the new investments, between the end of 2000 and mid-2003, effective capacity experienced a 43% increase, with the distribution network also showing improvement. This led to temporary reduction in blackouts and distribution losses and increasing operating efficiency, the combination of which translated in improvements in the quality of service. Unserved energy decreased to 11% of the potential demand in 2002, down from 40% in 1991. In the same period, capacity deficits to meet unsuppressed demand were estimated to have fallen from 30% to 16%. However, rising oil prices, the introduction of generalized subsidies and political interference negatively affected the sector's financial health. In 2003, these unfavorable conditions and strong political pressure led the government to repurchase Union Fenosa's shares in the privatized distribution companies EdeNorte and EdeSur. These companies have experienced a deteriorating operating efficiency since their renationalization.,

The electricity sector has been in a sustained crisis since 2002, characterized by very high losses (both technical and commercial) and frequent blackouts of long duration. This situation has led to very high economic and social costs: high fiscal costs to the government; high production costs and uncertainty to industrial consumers as a result of service interruptions; high costs to industrial and residential consumers for public and private power generation, and increased social instability, including rising crime rates, caused by frequent blackouts and disruption in basic public services (e.g. hospitals, clinics and schools). In addition, domestic and international investment has been deterred, especially in sectors that depend on a reliable power supply for their activities, although many facilities (such as tourist resorts) have their own sources of power supply.

==== Blackout Reduction Program ====
The Blackout Reduction Program (PRA) was established by the government in 2001. Initially designed to last two years, it has been subsequently extended in the absence of an alternative way to deal with the issues it addresses. This program has the objective of targeting subsidies to the poor on a geographical basis and implementing rolling blackouts in a more organized fashion. The poorest neighborhoods in the cities were to have a provision of about 20 hours of electricity per day at a price highly subsidized by the government and the utility. The PRA was initially considered a success. However, the country's macroeconomic crisis, the perverse incentives built into the PRA, and the deficiently targeted subsidy scheme have jeopardized the medium-term sustainability of the program. The absence of demand management, the lack of metering systems, sustained losses, a culture of non-payment and the absence of incentives for the distribution companies to fix the technical problems make it urgent to design a new subsidy and rationing system that is part of a more comprehensive approach to solve the problems of the power sector. The program was closed in 2010.

==== Measures against fraud: modification of the Electricity Law ====
In 2002, the government created the National Program to Support the Eradication of Electricity Fraud (PAEF) (Decree No. 748-02), whose main objective is to support the distribution companies in their efforts to eliminate fraud. However, results of the PAEF to date have been modest. The most serious step to combat fraud was taken in 2007 with the modification of the Electricity Law. Law 186-07, which modifies Law 125-01, criminalizes electricity fraud (e.g.illegal connections, non-payment, etc.), prescribing fines and/or jail sentences to those who breach its mandate.

==== Comprehensive Plan for the Electricity Sector ====
In 2006, by request of President Leonel Fernández, the CDEEE, the CNE and the SIE designed a Comprehensive Plan for the Electricity Sector for the period 2006-2012. This Plan aims at achieving self-sustainability of the Electricity Sector in the Dominican Republic. The main objectives of the plan are: achieve financial sustainability of the sector, reduce electricity prices for final consumers and promote an efficient use of energy. For the medium term, it recommends the renegotiation of contracts with generators, the construction of coal plants, the development of transmission plans, the addition of new hydroelectric capacity, the promotion of renewable energy sources, a review of cross-subsidies and the strengthening of the Electricity Superintendence (SIE).

== Tariffs and subsidies ==
=== Tariffs ===
Electricity tariffs in the Dominican Republic are among the highest in the Latin American and Caribbean region. This is due to several factors: reliance on imported oil, weak institutional environment, difficulties to pursue large non-payers, high prices originally negotiated in power purchase agreements with the generators, high commercial risks faced by generators such as non-payment or delayed payment by the distribution companies and/or the government, low cash recovery index (CRI), and high operating costs in the distribution companies.

The country's policy of cross-subsidizing residential tariffs by disproportionate increases in commercial and industrial tariffs translates into higher rates for industrial and commercial consumers compared to residential consumers. In 2007, the average residential tariff was US$0.160 per kWh (LAC weighted average was US$0.115 in 2005), while the average industrial tariff was 0.230 (LAC weighted average was US$0.107 per kWh in 2005) and the average commercial tariff was as high as US$0.290 per kWh.

=== Subsidies ===
Electricity subsidies are estimated to exceed US$ 1 billion in 2008, corresponding to a stunning 3% of GDP. The need for subsidies has increased due to higher oil prices while electricity tariffs have been kept constant. Subsidies are channeled through two major mechanisms: The Blackout Reduction Program and the Tariff Stabilization Fund.

The Blackout Reduction Program (PRA) is targeted to poor areas. Due to low collections rates, these consumers have been receiving virtually free electricity since the program's inception.

Residential consumers outside the PRA areas and thus likely not to be among the poorest, are charged below-cost electricity prices for consumption below 700 kWh/month, a very high threshold by international standards. About 80% of residential users outside the PRA areas fall into this category. This subsidy is drawn from the Tariff Stabilization Fund (FET), which was designed to reduce the impact of high oil prices. The financial burden in this case is transferred to the distribution companies, which have found themselves unable to cover their costs in a scenario of rising oil prices, low efficiency and a limited customer base that could be charged to finance the cross-subsidy. This situation has forced the government to provide much higher than expected subsidies to the sector, which in turn translates into reduced ability to finance investments in other key sectors such as health and education. The government has started to reduce cross-subsidies gradually, with the final objective of limiting them to households with monthly consumption below 200 kWh, which is closer to thresholds for subsidized residential electricity encountered in other countries.

== Investment and financing ==
The power sector attracted an important amount of foreign direct investment (FDI) following the privatization of the main generation facilities and the distribution companies in 1999 and the subsequent expansion in generation capacity. In the period 1996-2000, the sector accounted for over 28% of FDI, reaching 37% in 2001.

=== Generation ===
As previously described, the precarious situation of the electricity sector in the Dominican Republic is not caused primarily by limited generation capacity. Although a reduction of losses may provide a more economic way of resolving the crisis, there are plans for significant new investments in new generation capacity, especially in hydropower.

The private generation companies raise capital in the market. For example, in April 2007 EGE Haina raised US$ 175m in capital through 10-year bonds that were more than 10 times oversubscribed.

As for hydropower, Egehid's has identified in its 2006-2012 expansion plan new projects for an estimated value of US$1,442 million. The construction of first three dams (Pinalito, Palomino and Las Placetas) and associated hydropower plants will be partially financed through tied export financing from the Brazilian Development Bank BNDES approved in November 2006. The loans for the Palomino and Las Placetas projects total US$ 152.5 million, while the total costs of the facilities is estimated at US$ 512.5 million. A loan for the Pinalito project had already been approved earlier. Additional financing is provided by commercial Banks such as ABN and BNP Paribas.

=== Transmission ===
There are bottlenecks in the transmission system that need to be addressed. The owner of the system, the CDE, lacks financial resources to improve the grid and the existing legislation has not allowed other mechanisms to mobilize private sector resources for transmission.

The Electricity Transmission Company (ETED) has produced an expansion plan for the transmission network to be executed in the period 2006-2012. Financing of US$284 million has been secured for the 2006-2008 period, with an additional US$80.75 million in process. Furthermore, US$222.5 million will be needed to finance the projects contemplated in the expansion plan for the period 2008-2012.

=== Rural electrification ===
The Dominican Government claims to have plans to invest, through the Rural and Suburban Electrification Unit (UERS), about RD$1,500 million (US$890 million) in large number of scattered projects.

== Summary of private participation in the electricity sector ==
In 1998–1999, the Public Sector Enterprises Reform Law provided the framework for the privatization and restructuring of the power sector, previously controlled by the vertically state-owned monopoly, Corporación Dominicana de Electricidad (CDE). A comprehensive regulatory framework was enacted in 2001, which determined the government's operational presence in the sector through three entities: CDE(generation), EGEHID (hydroelectric generation), and ETED (transmission). As for distribution, two of the three existing companies, EdeNorte and EdeSur, are owned by the government, who also holds 50% ownership of the third one, EdeEste.

Activity	Private participation (%)
Generation	86.1% of installed capacity
Transmission	0%
Distribution	50% of one of the three distribution companies

== Electricity and the environment ==
=== Responsibility for the environment ===
The Secretaría de Estado de Medio Ambiente y Recursos Naturales is the institution in charge of the conservation, protection and regulation of the sustainable use of the natural resources and the environment in the Dominican Republic.

=== Greenhouse gas emissions ===
OLADE (Latin American Energy Organization) estimated that CO_{2} emissions from electricity production in 2003 were 7.63 million tons of CO_{2}, which corresponds to 46% of total emissions from the energy sector. This high contribution to emissions from electricity production in comparison with other countries in the region is due to the high share of thermal generation.

=== CDM projects in electricity ===
Currently (December 2007), there is just one registered CDM project in the electricity sector in the Dominican Republic, the El Guanillo wind farm, with estimated emission reductions of 123,916 tCO_{2}e per year.

== External assistance ==
=== World Bank ===
The World Bank is currently financing a Power Sector Technical Assistance Project. The US$10 million project will receive US$7.3 million funding from the Bank in the period 2004-2009. This project aims to: (i) strengthen the Government's regulatory and consumer protection performance, (ii) improve policy formulation and implementation, (iii) design the transmission grid and the wholesale power market, (iv) increase the quantity and quality of electricity for the poor, and (v) protect the environment.

The World Bank is also financing the Second Generation Power Sector Reforms of the Dominican Republic Power Sector Program through US$150 million of financing in the period 2005-2008. The power sector program, which consists of two policy-based loans and an investment loan for transmission and service expansion, seeks to support the Government's strategy for the recovery of the power sector, and in particular to: improve the quality of service, especially by reducing the widespread blackouts of recent years; establish conditions that would permit the financial sustainability of all efficiently-operated companies in the sector; and, increase the percentage of the population with access to electricity.

== Inter-American Development Bank ==
The Inter-American Development Bank (IDB) supported the electricity sector reforms of the late 1990s, the creation of a National Energy Council and demand-side management to reduce electricity consumption through various technical assistance projects approved between 1996 and 2001. The IDB's private-sector arm also provided loans to the private electricity distribution companies Ede Sur and Ede Norte in 1999.

== See also ==
- Economy of the Dominican Republic
- Water supply and sanitation in the Dominican Republic
- History of the Dominican Republic
- Government of the Dominican Republic

== Sources ==
- Comisión Nacional de Energía, 2004. Plan Energético Nacional 2004-2015
- Comisión Nacional de Energía, 2005. Plan Indicativo de Generación del Sector Eléctrico Dominicano (PIG) 2006-2018
- CNE, CDEEE, SIE 2006. Plan Integral del Sector Eléctrico de República Dominicana 2006-2012
- Olade, 2006. Energy Statistics Report 2005.
- World Bank, 2006. Dominican Republic: Country Economic Memorandum. The Foundations of Growth and Competitiveness
- World Bank, 2007.Closing the Electricity Supply-Demand Gap. Case Study: The Dominican Republic.
