= Ozama River =

Coordinates: 18.4667°N 69.8833°W

Ozama
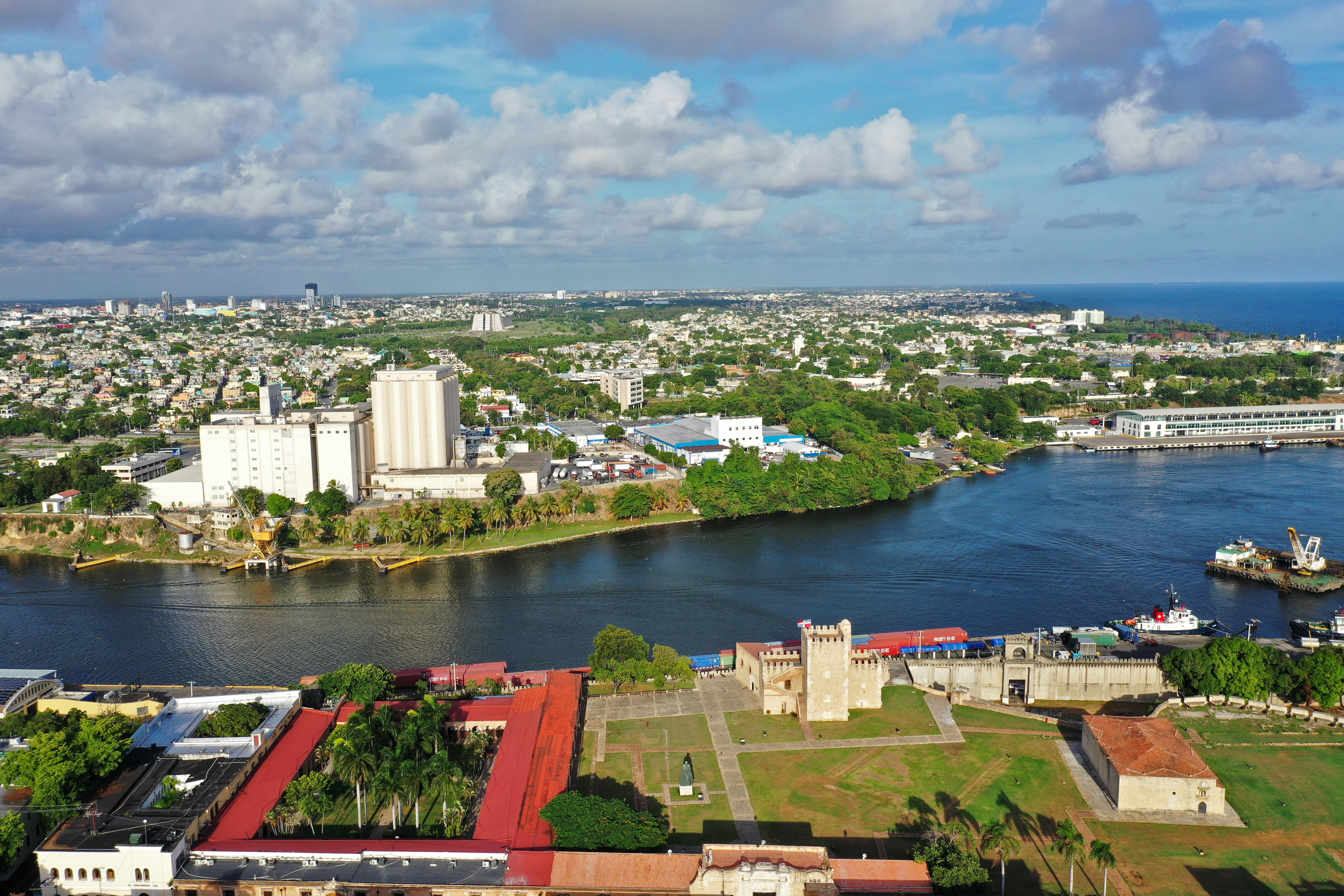
- Ozama River in Santo Domingo

Location
- Country: Dominican Republic

Physical characteristics
- Source
  - location: Loma Siete Cabezas, Sierra de Yamasá, Dominican Republic
- Mouth
  - location: Caribbean Sea, Dominican Republic
  - elevation: 0 m (0 ft)
- Length: 148 km (92 mi)
- Basin size: 2,685 km^{2} (1,037 sq mi)

Basin features
- Tributaries
  - left: Savita, Yabacao
  - right: La Isabela River

The Ozama River (Spanish: Río Ozama) is a river in the Dominican Republic. It rises in the Loma Siete Cabezas mountain in the Sierra de Yamasá mountain range, close to the town of Villa Altagracia. It emptyies into the Caribbean Sea after passing through Santo Domingo, the country's capital.

== History ==
In 1498, Bartolome Colon had a fort built on the Ozama River delta, which would later become the first permanent European settlement in the New World (Santo Domingo). The estuary at that time, "teemed with fish and where the Indians raised cassava and yams," according to Floyd.

== Course ==
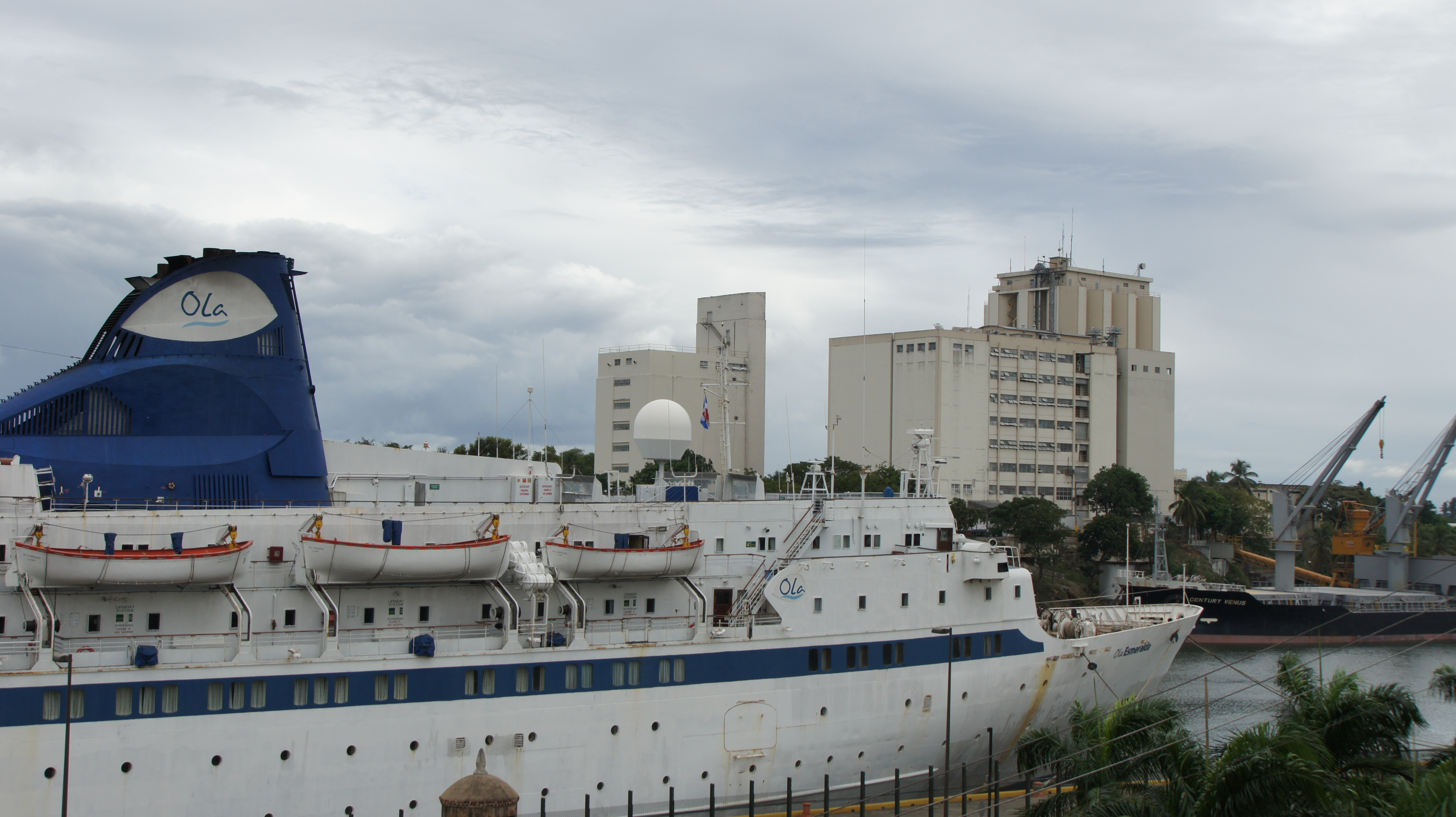
Port in Ozama river.

The river flows 148 kilometers (92 mi) before emptying into the Caribbean Sea. At the end of the journey it bisects the capital, Santo Domingo, into eastern and western halves. The three main tributaries of the Ozama are the Isabela River, the Sabita River and the Yabacao River.

The Ozama's basin is the fourth largest in the Dominican Republic. The river has several tributaries, with a combined area of 2,706 square kilometers (1,045 sq mi). The river basin has an annual precipitation of 1,400 mm (55 in) to 2,250 mm (89 in) per year.

== Pollution ==
The Ozama River is heavily polluted. It is constantly affected by the slums on its shores and the factories that dump their waste into it. It is one of the main causes of pollution on the coastline of Santo Domingo. In August 2020, The Ocean Cleanup organization deployed an Interceptor Original, one of their solar-powered, automated systems, to help combat the flow of plastics and trash into the Caribbean Sea.

== See also ==
- Port of Santo Domingo
