= Yaque del Sur River =

Coordinates: 18°28′08″N 71°04′56″W

Yaque del Sur
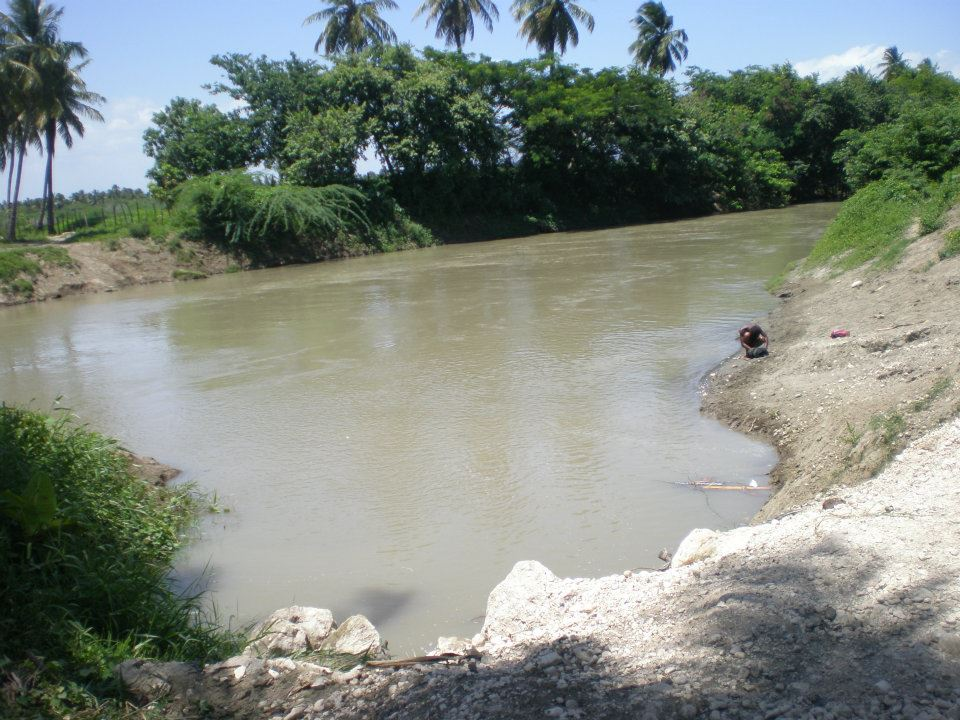

Location
- Country: Dominican Republic
- Provinces: San Juan, Valverde, Baoruco, Barahona

Physical characteristics
- Length: 183 km (114 mi)
- Basin size: 4,972 km^{2} (1,920 sq mi)

The Yaque del Sur River (Spanish, Río Yaque del Sur) is a river in the southwestern Dominican Republic. It is approximately 183 km in length.

== Etymology ==
Yaque or Yaqui was a Taíno word given to two rivers in the Dominican Republic. One of those rivers is called the Yaque del Norte ("Northern Yaque"), and goes to the north of Hispaniola, emptying in the Atlantic Ocean; and the second, the Yaque del Sur ("Southern Yaque") goes to the south, emptying in the Caribbean Sea.

== Uses ==
The river is not navigable, except by small craft. It is important and used extensively for irrigating rice, plantain, sugarcane, beans, bananas, and peanuts.
