= List of national parks of the Dominican Republic =

List of the National parks of the Dominican Republic, located on and near the island of Hispaniola, in the Caribbean region.

== Dominican national park system ==
The Dominican national park system includes:

- urban parks and recreational areas.
- nature reserves — protecting the country's natural habitats, flora, and fauna.
- zoological & botanical gardens — protecting the country's flora and fauna.

The Ministry of the Environment is the institution in charge of the development, administration, organization, and maintenance of all the country's natural and recreational areas. Its principal objective is to conserve the nation's natural resources and unique ecological heritage, for the perennial enjoyment of present and future generations.

== National park listings ==
A partial listing of Dominican national parks includes:

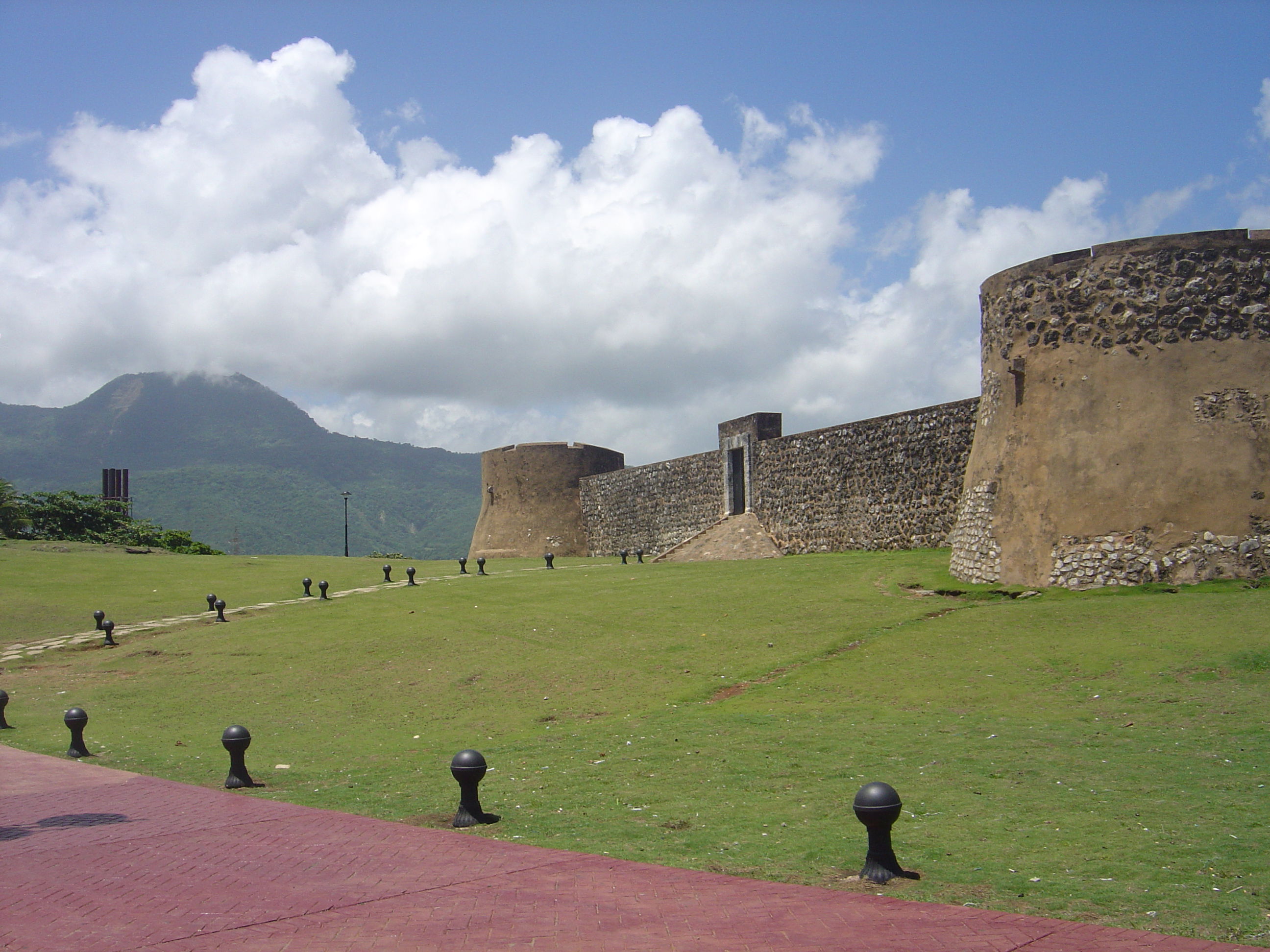
View of Monte Isabel De Torres and the Fortaleza de San Felipe, in Puerto Plata

- Cueva de las Maravillas National Park (Cave of Miracles National Park)
  Close to San Pedro de Macorís at the south coast. Taino paintings.
- Parque Nacional Del Este (Del Este National Park)
  In the south-east of the country/island, between La Romana and the mouth of the Yuma River. It includes the coastal Isla Saona (island) in the Caribbean Sea. 110 different species of birds and dolphins have been identified within the park. Also known as Cotubanamá National Park.
- El Choco National Park (Parque Nacional El Choco)
  With the caves of Cabarete (Las cuevas de Cabarete) at the shore, where one can swim in them. El Choco can be explored on horses. Native orchids live in the park's habitats.
- La Gran Sabana National Park
- Isabel De Torres National Park (Parque Nacional Isabel De Torres)
  In San Felipe de Puerto Plata
- Isla Cabritos National Park (Parque Nacional Isla Cabritos)
  On Cabritos Island of Enriquillo Lake, in the southwestern Dominican Republic near the border with Haiti.

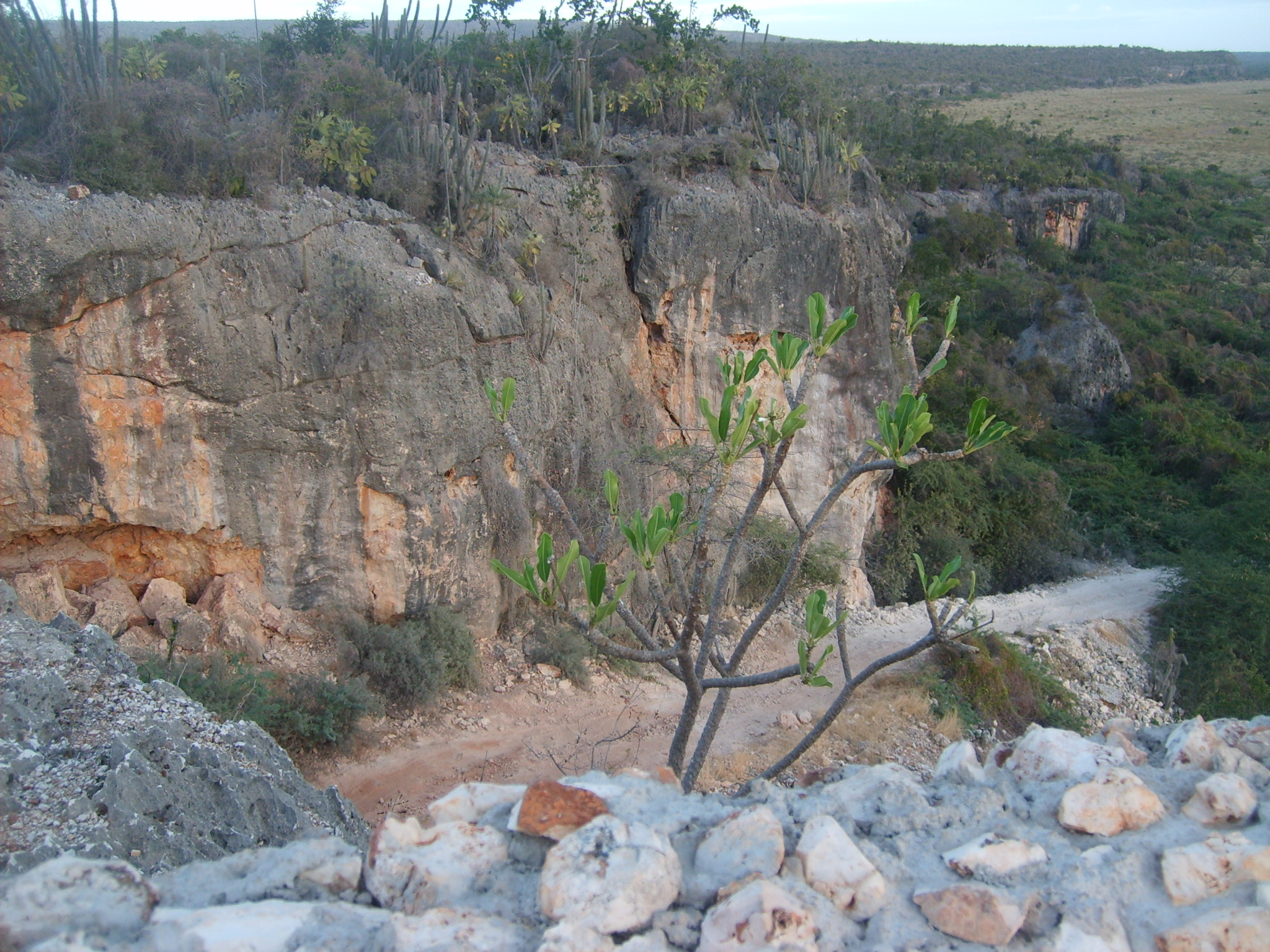
Jaragua National Park

- Jaragua National Park (Parque Nacional Jaragua)
  In the southwestern Dominican Republic, with 130 different bird species, and 4,500-year-old Taino pictographs.
- José Armando Bermúdez National Park (Parque Nacional Armando Bermúdez)
  In the Cordillera Central mountain range. Contains some of the highest mountains in the Caribbean region, including: Pico Duarte, La Pelona, Loma La Rucilla, and Yaque.
- José del Carmen Ramírez National Park (Parque Nacional José Del Carmen Ramírez)
  In the center of the island, near San Juan de la Maguana and Loma De La Viuda (mountain).
- La Caleta Underwater National Park

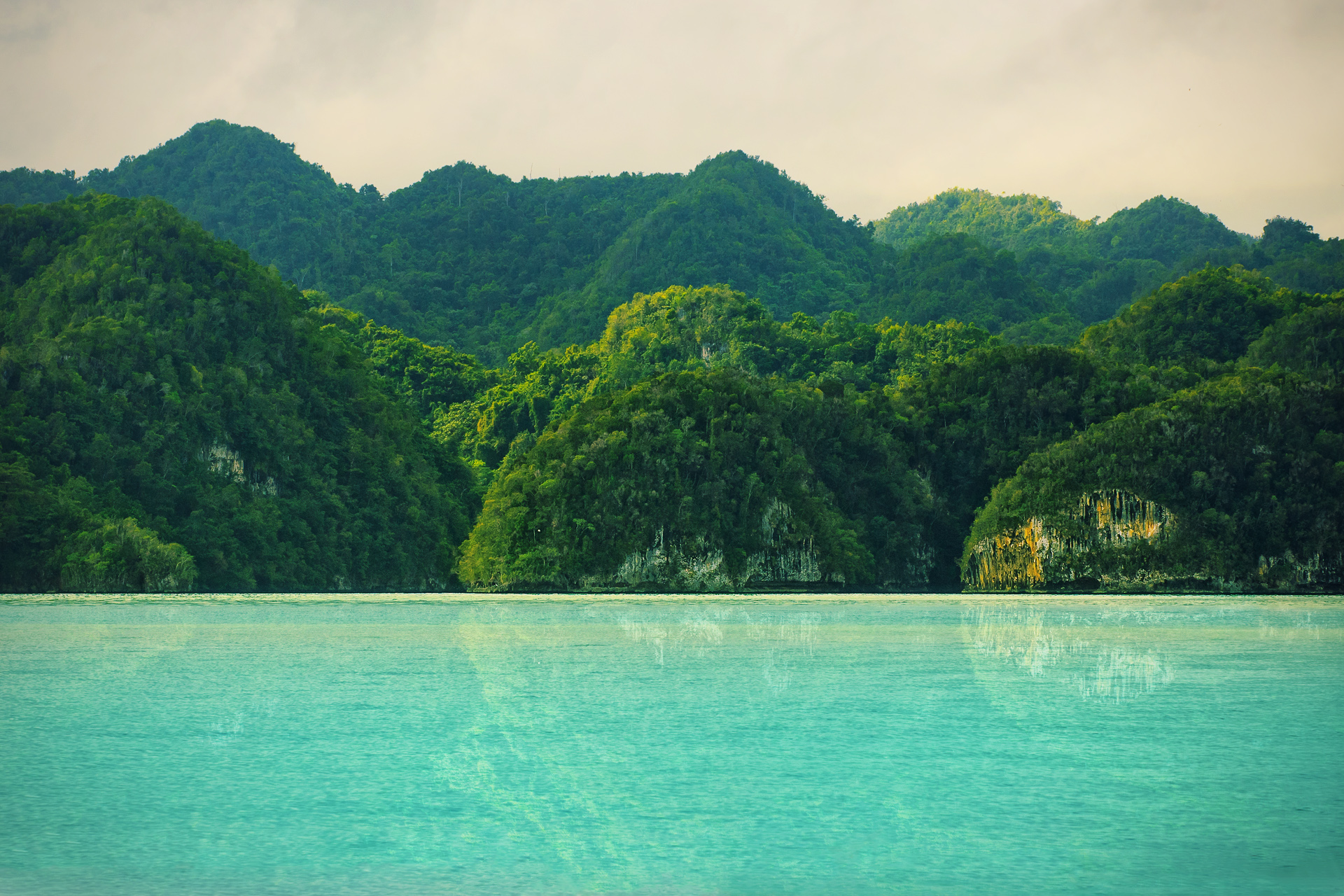
Los Haitises National Park

- Los Haitises National Park (Parque Nacional Los Haitises)
  On Samaná Bay, with 700 different plants, and 110 different birds.
- Monte Cristi National Park (Parque Nacional Monte Cristi)
  In the northwestern Dominican Republic, near the border with Haiti.
- Sierra De Baoruco National Park (Parque Nacional Sierra De Baoruco)
  In the high Sierra De Baoruco mountain range, of the southwestern Dominican Republic towards the border with Haiti. The town of Barahona and Enriquillo Lake are in the vicinity.
- The Three Eyes National Park (Parque Nacional Los Tres Ojos)
  Near Santo Domingo, this nature area features a series of caverns and underground lagoons.
- Valle Nuevo National Park (Parque Nacional Valle Nuevo)
  Also known as Juan Bautista Perez Rancier National Park (Parque Nacional Juan Bautista Pérez Rancier), it's located in a high plateau averaging 7500 ft above sea level in Azua Province, La Vega Province, and San José de Ocoa Province. The park features include Las Pirámides de Valle Nuevo, Monument to Caamaño, Salto de Aguas Blancas (Aguas Blancas falls) which is the highest waterfall in the Antilles, Villa Pajon Ecolodge, Alto de la Bandera the fourth highest peak in the Antilles, a military base, Valle Encantado, and other features.
- Reserva Científica Ébano Verde
  Scientific and nature reserve near the town of Constanza.
- Pueblo Viejo National Park
  Includes the old city of Concepción de la Vega, and the Pueblo Viejo gold mine.

== See also ==
- Flora of Hispaniola — Dominican Republic & Haiti.
- List of national parks — global.
