= Valle Nuevo National Park =

National park in the Dominican Republic

- Juan Bautista Pérez Rancier National Park
- IUCN category II (national park)
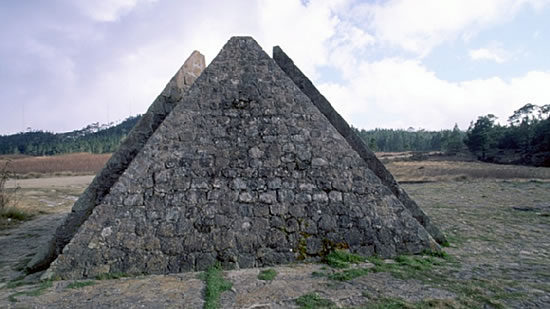
- Cyclopean Pyramid in Valle Nuevo

- Location within the Dominican Republic
- Interactive map of Valle Nuevo National Park
- Location: La Vega Province, Dominican Republic
- Nearest city: Constanza
- Coordinates: 18°42′25″N 70°36′09″W
- Area: 910 km^{2} (350 sq mi)
- Designation: National Park
- Established: Protected Area (1961); Natural Scientific Reserve (1983); National Park (1996)
- Governing body: Directorate of Protected Areas

Valle Nuevo National Park (Spanish: Parque Nacional Valle Nuevo) (also known as Juan Bautista Perez Rancier National Park) is a protected area in the central region of the Dominican Republic, featuring a unique biodiversity in the Caribbean. Established in 1996, it is located on a plateau at over 2,200 meters (7,218 feet) in elevation, with its highest point being 2,842 meters (9,324 feet) at the extinct volcano Loma Alto de la Bandera. It is characterized by vegetation typical of the Nearctic ecozone. Valle Nuevo emerged after the glacier that once covered the Cordillera Central mountain range melted during the Last Glacial Maximum. When the Spanish arrived, the area was covered with shallow lakes, according to accounts by Spanish chronicler Gonzalo Fernández de Oviedo.

== Location ==
The park is in the center of the Dominican Republic, covering 910 square kilometers (351 square miles), primarily in the province of La Vega, though it also extends into the provinces of Monseñor Nouel, San José de Ocoa, and Azua. Its boundaries lie 15 kilometers (9.3 miles) from the city of Constanza.

Its high elevations contribute to three different watersheds: the Nizao, Yaque del Sur, and Yuna. An unpaved road (Route 41, also known as Antonio Duvergé) crosses the park from north to south.

Valle Nuevo is considered the southeastern terminus of the Cordillera Central mountain range, with its highest foothills to the east (rising above 2,000 meters (6,562 feet)) located 30 kilometers (18.6 miles) from the Caribbean Sea.

== History ==
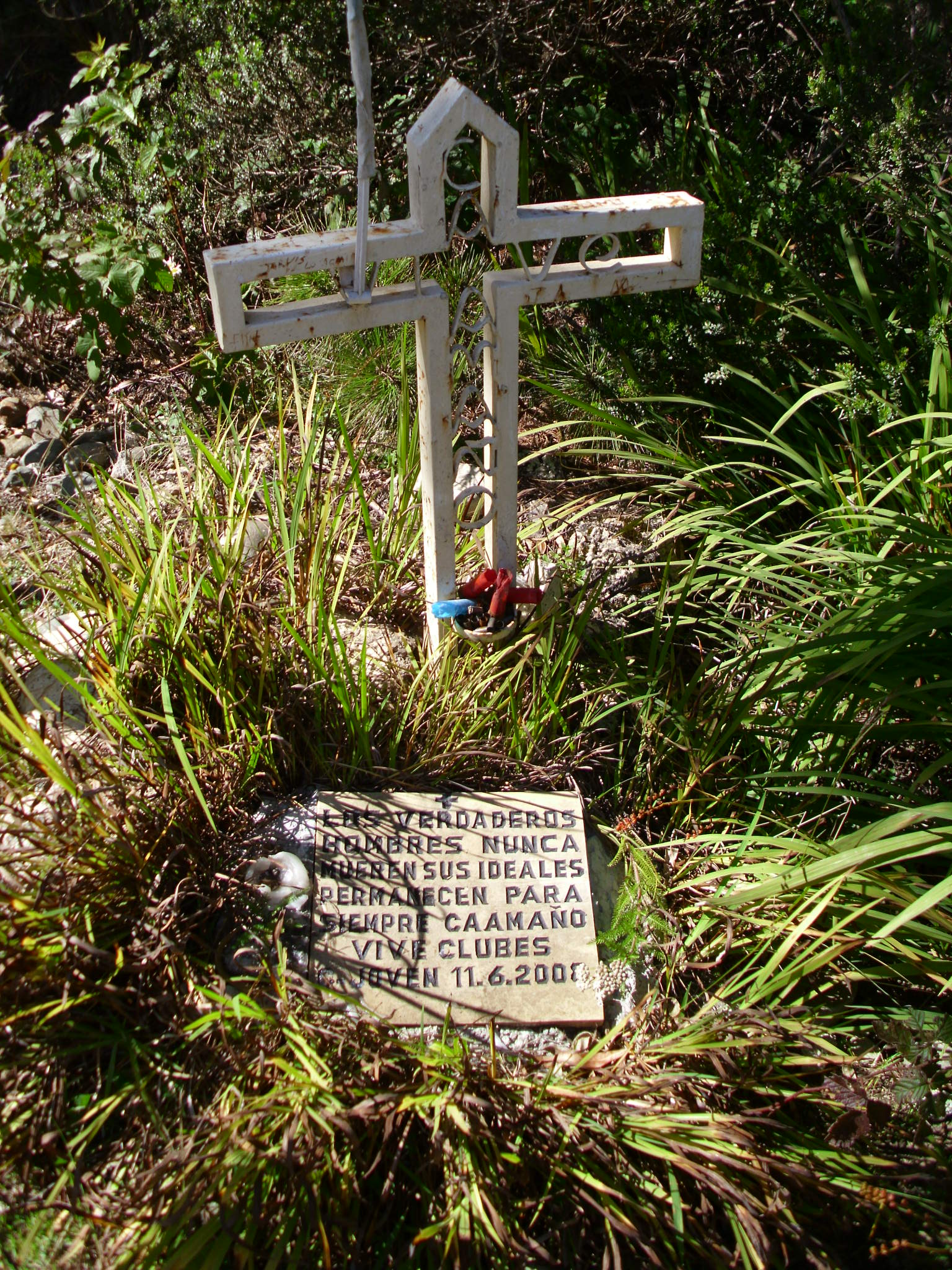
Memorial for Caamaño

Cattle ranching has been practiced in the area since at least the mid-18th century. The German-born explorer and British consul Robert Hermann Schomburgk visited the area in 1852.

In 1887, Danish explorer, naturalist, and diplomat Heinrik Franz Alexander von Eggers (also known as the Baron of Eggers) documented his travels in Valle Nuevo.

During the U.S. occupation of the Dominican Republic (1916–1924), several topographic survey teams explored and triangulated geodetic points. To distinguish different peaks, they set up flags. Thus, one of these points, Pico de Sabana Alta, was renamed Alto de la Bandera ("bandera" means flag in Spanish) due to the surveying operations.

In 1937, dictator Rafael Leónidas Trujillo built a summer residence in the area.

In the 1950s, the road connecting Constanza and San José de Ocoa was built and inaugurated in January 1959. Initially named after Héctor Trujillo, the road was later designated as Route 41 and is now also called Antonio Duvergé Highway. Alongside the road, the Cyclopean Pyramid (Las Pirámides) was constructed in the Valle de los Frailes, marking the former municipal boundary between Constanza and San José de Ocoa. The pyramid, consisting of four segments, is located in a section of the road known as La Nevera.

In July 1961, the area was declared a restricted zone.

On February 16, 1973, military leader and guerrilla fighter Francisco Caamaño Deñó was executed within the current park's boundaries, in an area called Nizaíto. Caamaño, who had been provisional president of the Dominican Republic, took up arms against the government of Joaquín Balaguer, which he deemed illegitimate. A small iron cross marks the site of his execution, and in 2013, a memorial was added nearby.

In February 1983, a fire destroyed 32 square kilometers (12.3 square miles) of forest. That same year, the area was declared a scientific reserve. In 1996, it was reclassified as a national park under the official name Juan B. Pérez Rancier National Park. However, Dominican government institutions often refer to it simply as Valle Nuevo.

Since 2000, the newly established Ministry of Environment and Natural Resources has implemented monitoring stations and removed some military settlements and facilities, including those in Valle Nuevo, Rancho Enmedio, and Sabana Quéliz. Before the ministry took over, the Dominican Army was responsible for managing and protecting the park.

In July 2014, a forest fire severely affected the park, destroying at least one-fourth of its forested area.

== Ecotourism ==
The national park has high potential for ecotourism, with activities such as birdwatching, hiking, camping, and sightseeing. Studies and management plans are underway to develop public use programs and facilities that will promote ecotourism in the area.

The Antonio Duvergé Highway, which spans 90 kilometers (56 miles), connects San José de Ocoa and Constanza, offering scenic views, diverse ecosystems, and wildlife encounters. In Valle de los Frailes, visitors can find Las Pirámides, a monument (Cyclopean Pyramid) built to commemorate the inauguration of the Constanza–San José de Ocoa road.

== Geography ==
=== Rivers ===
The park is home to over 500 sources of freshwater. Several major rivers originate there, including the Nizao, Grande, Cuevas, Blanco, Banilejo, Ocoa, and Tireíto.

=== Mountains ===
The park includes Alto de la Bandera, at 2,842 meters (9,324 feet), the fourth-highest peak on the island of Hispaniola. Other significant peaks include Loma del Macho, Loma Alto de Valle Nuevo, Tetero de Mejía, Tina (Pajón Blanco), Loma Adentro, and Loma Cabeza del Río. On Route 41, the highest point reaches 2,525 meters (8,284 feet) near Nizao.

== Climate ==
Due to its high altitude, temperatures rarely exceed 20°C (68°F). In winter, temperatures often drop below freezing, with recorded lows reaching -7°C (19°F).

On January 7, 2024, an unofficial record low of -10°C (14°F) was reported.

The region frequently experiences frost and ice formations. In 2003, the National Meteorological Office (ONAMET) installed a modern automatic weather station that transmitted data until February 2008. It was reactivated in June 2010, providing hourly updates on temperature, relative humidity, rainfall, barometric pressure, solar radiation, and wind speed. These data can be accessed in real time on the institution's website.

== Ecosystem ==
=== Flora ===
The park is home to 531 plant species, of which 138 are endemic to Hispaniola. Extensive pine forests dominate the area, primarily consisting of the Hispaniolan pine (Pinus occidentalis). The cloud forests of Mechecito and Pichón feature species such as palo de viento, ebony, and cara de hombre (Haenianthus salicifolius). Several palm and mangrove species are also present.

=== Fauna ===
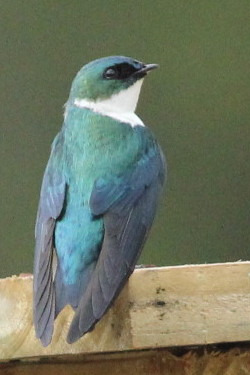
Adult Hispaniolan Golden Swallow perched on artificial nest-box

The park contains 66 bird species, 48 butterfly species, 29 reptile species, and 17 amphibian species. Among its wildlife, feral cats—slightly larger than domestic cats—have been reported, along with wild rabbits, which have proliferated in the areas of La Nevera and Sabana Quéliz. Endemic bird species include the palmchat (Dulus dominicus). Among reptiles and amphibians, the park is home to Anolis lizards and numerous frog species from the Eleutherodactylus genus, which rely on the park as one of their last refuges.

== Geology ==
The park features geological formations dating back to the Cretaceous period. Evidence of glacial activity, particularly in the highest areas such as Alto de la Bandera, includes cirques, ridges, glacial channels, moraines, and depressions filled with peat.

== Human impact ==
=== Tourism ===
Tourist attractions within the park include the 60-meter Aguas Blancas waterfall, the Cyclopean Pyramid, Alto de la Bandera, and the monument to Francisco Caamaño. Villa Pajón offers limited lodging within the park, while the Divino Niño statue stands atop a 20-meter hill.

=== Agricultural impact ===
Approximately 10% of the park’s area is used for agriculture. Deforestation has altered the microclimate, and the loss of 75% of historical manaclar forests has significantly impacted local wildlife. Around 4,000 people live in 20 agricultural communities within the park, with the highest concentration in the southern areas near La Nuez and La Horma.

== See also ==
- Constanza, Dominican Republic
- List of national parks of the Dominican Republic
