= Monte Cristi National Park =

National park in the Dominican Republic

- Parque Nacional Monte Cristi
- IUCN category II (national park)
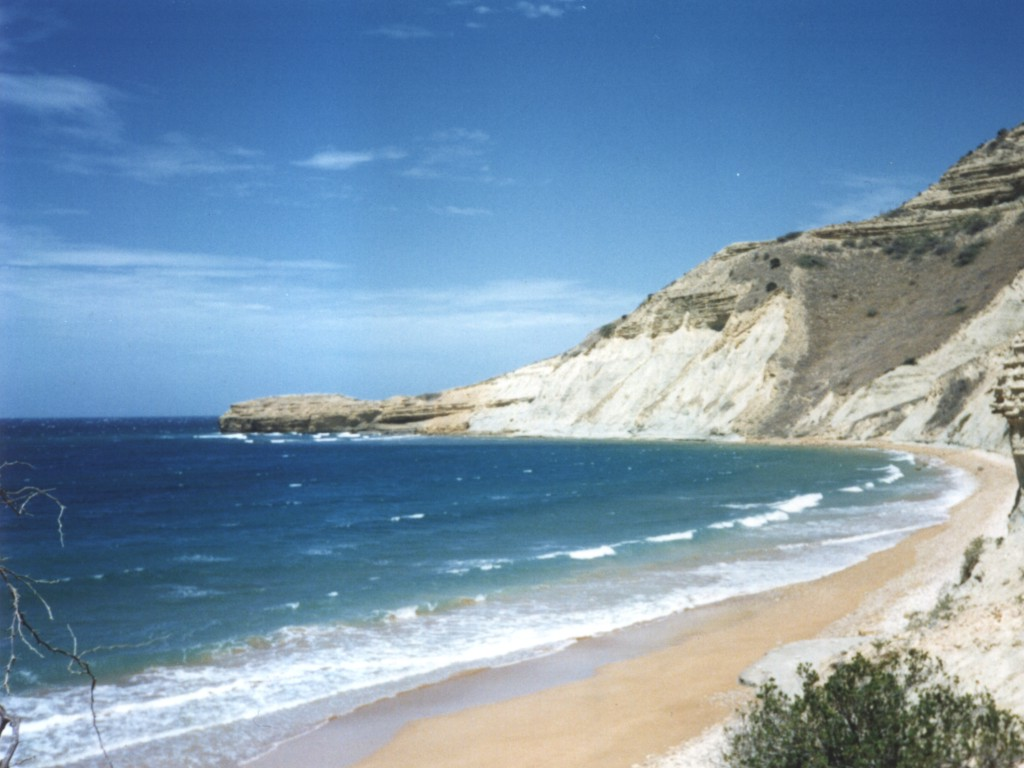
- Monte Cristi coastline

- Location within the Dominican Republic
- Interactive map of Monte Cristi National Park
- Location: Monte Cristi Province, Dominican Republic
- Nearest city: San Fernando de Monte Cristi
- Coordinates: 19°46′37″N 71°42′08″W
- Area: 550 km^{2} (210 sq mi)
- Established: 1983

Monte Cristi National Park (Parque National Monte Cristi) is a national park on the Caribbean Island of Hispaniola that extends from the borders of Haiti to Punta Rucia in the Dominican Republic and covers an area of 550 km^{2}. It contains coastal lagoons, beaches, mangrove swamps, a 237 m (777 ft) limestone mesa from which can be seen offshore keys and forested slopes of the mesa's northern side.

The area is very dry, receiving just over two inches of rain per year. The huge mesa provides a habitat for an indigenous plant species called sabia montecristini as well as several reptile species. There are no marked paths in the park.

== See also ==
- List of national parks of Dominican Republic
- Monte Cristi Pipe Wreck
