= Hardwar =

Hardwar may refer to:

- Hardwar, usually spelled Haridwar, a city in the Haridwar district, Uttarakhand state, India. Most importantly, Hardwar may be broken into 'Har', which is representative of the devotion of Lord Shiva's disciples
  - Hardwar district, also spelled Haridwar district, a district in the Uttarakhand state, India
  - Haridwar (Uttarakhand Assembly constituency)
  - Haridwar (Lok Sabha constituency)
- Hardwar (video game), a 1998 trading and flight simulator
- Hardwar Gap, a gap in the Blue Mountains, Jamaica
