= Cueva de las Maravillas National Park =

National park in the Dominican Republic

Cueva de las Maravillas
- IUCN category II (national park)
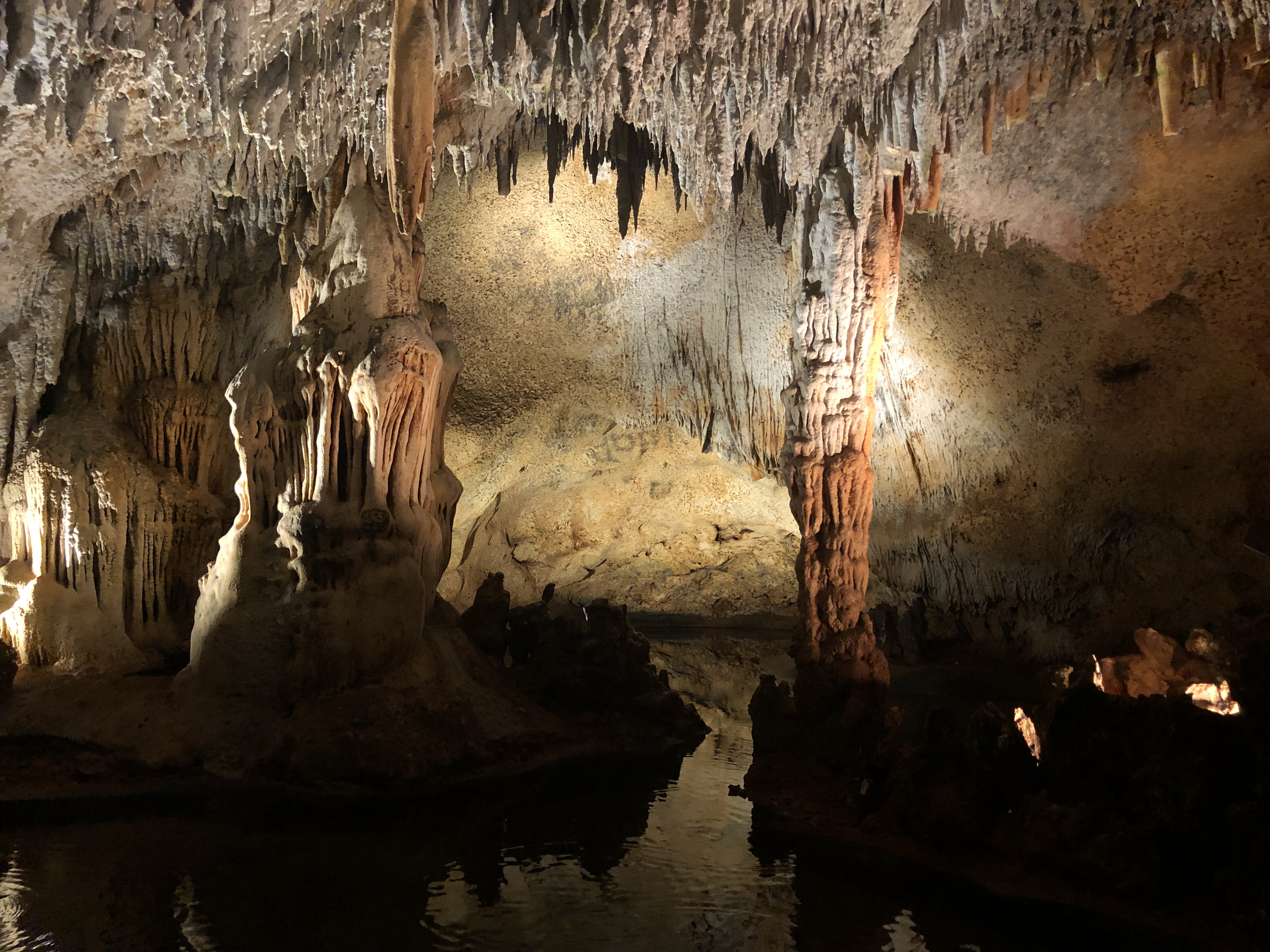

- Location within the Dominican Republic
- Interactive map of Cueva de las Maravillas
- Location: Dominican Republic
- Nearest city: San Pedro de Macorís & La Romana
- Coordinates: 18°27′10″N 69°09′33″W
- Area: 4.5 km^{2} (1.7 sq mi)

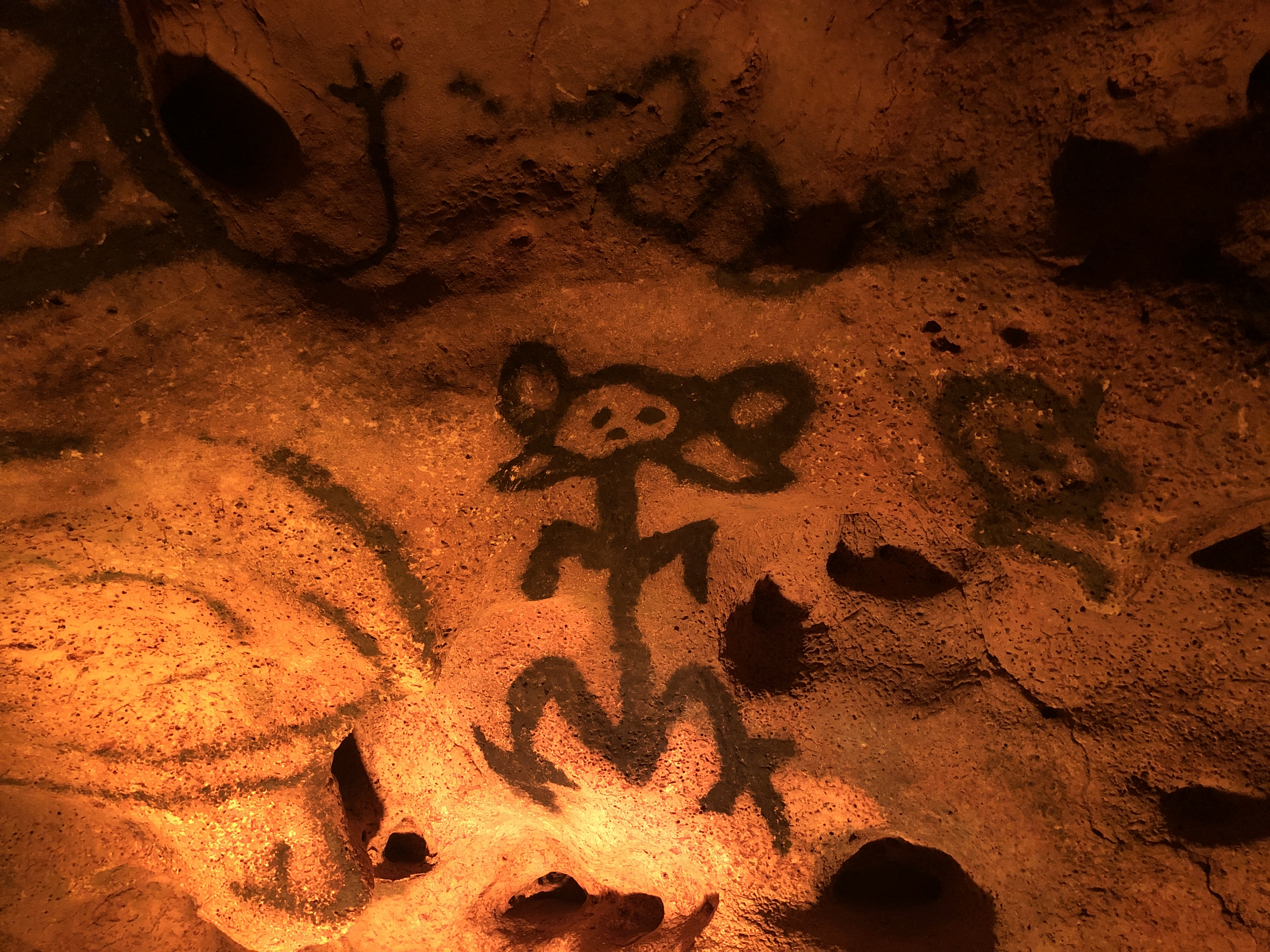
Taíno pictographs in Cuevas de las Maravillas, the Dominican Republic

The Parque nacional Cueva de las Maravillas (English: Cave of wonders National Park) is a national park located approximately 15 kilometres (9.3 mi) east from San Pedro de Macorís and 10 km (6.2 mi) west from La Romana, in the south-eastern part of the Dominican Republic on the Caribbean island of Hispaniola.

Named after the Cave of Wonders, it was previously known as the Cueva Jaguar until 1949, and it is well known for its ancient paintings by the Taíno Indians.

The park is located on the road between the town of San Pedro de Macorís and La Romana, near the Soco River and Cumayasa. It is 800 meters long and is 25 meters underground, and has an area of 4.5 square kilometers. The caves were declared a national park on July 22, 1997

Inside the cave you can see about 500 paintings and engravings on the walls, painted in black and red and made by the Taínos, the ancient inhabitants of the island.

According to reports, it has about 10 petroglyphs (rock engravings), and 472 pictographs (paintings on the walls). Of these 472, 144 pictographs were classified as cryptic or abstract and whimsical groupings at 69 points. In addition you can see 135 pictographs with a human face, 18 animal, 41 human and animal form, 18 and 38 geometric and human.

The attractions of the caves of wonder are pictographic, The Water Mirror Gallery, which consists of an artificial lake that reflects like a mirror the top of the cave and The Great Panel, in the latter you can see a cave painting created by the Taínos, which represents a funeral ritual, among others.

In the variety of flora include 48 natural species arraijanes, guáyiga, yellow caya, lignum vitae, pegapalo, jasmine, cat's claw, carboy, stick hen, black Cuba, yaya brown, bighorn coffee, cane juice, stick donkey, Pringamosa and bitter stick, among others.

The cave opens in limestone reef belongs to the geomorphological unit known as South East Coastal Plain.

In 1926 it was called Cueva Jaguar, and in 1949 Professor Francisco Richiez Acevedo assigned the name of Cave of wonders for the beauty revealing inside and everything visitors could imagine by looking at the figures created by the stalactites and stalagmites, as well as its wide variety of pictographs.
