= Ebano Verde Scientific Reserve =

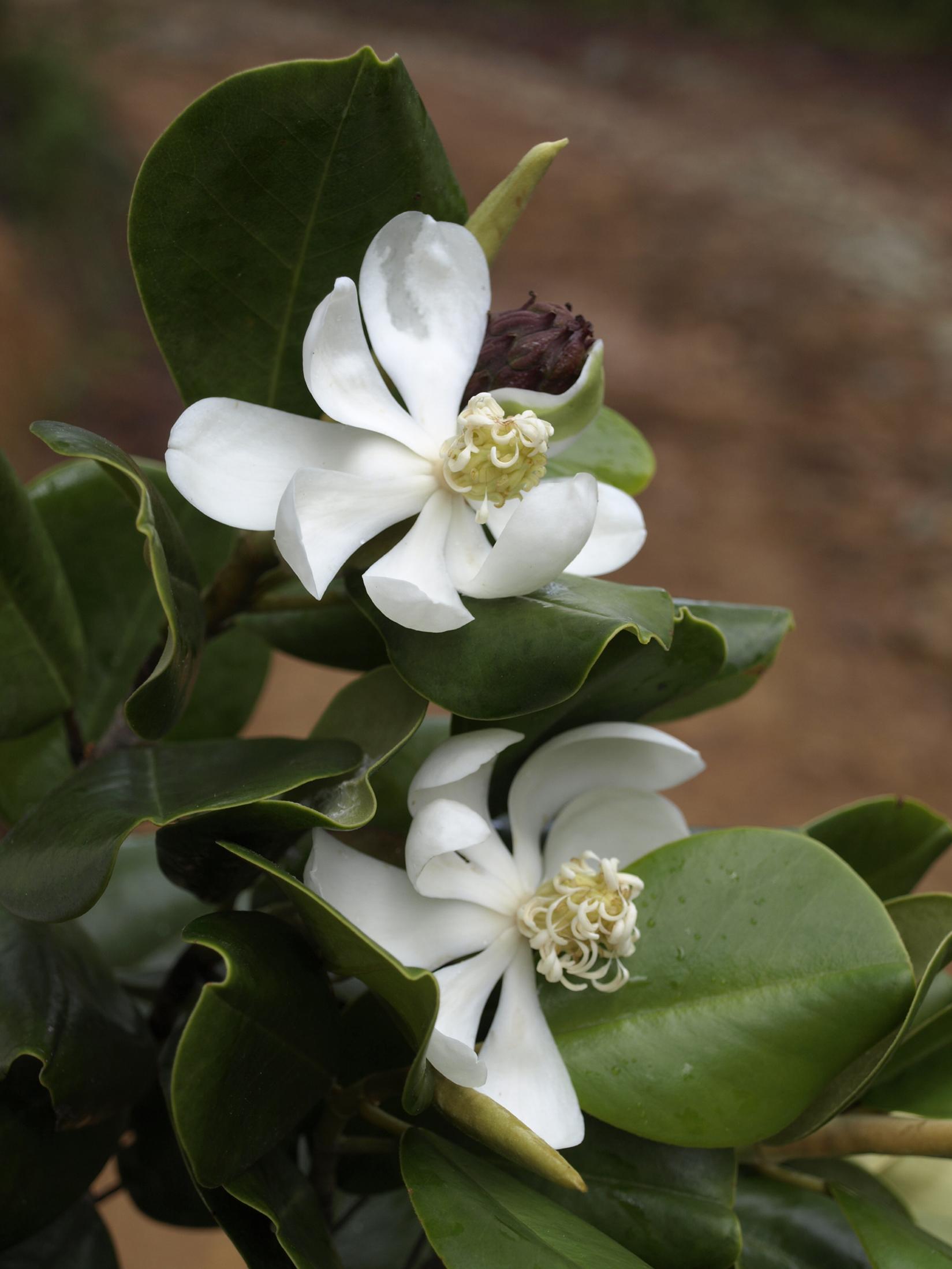
- Ebano Verde (Magnolia pallescens) flower, endemic to the region and namesake of the Reserve
- Interactive map of Ebano Verde Scientific Reserve
- Location: Jarabacoa, La Vega, Dominican Republic
- Nearest city: La Palma, Constanza, La Vega Province
- Coordinates: 19.0585°N 70.5443°W
- Area: 29 km^{2} (11 sq mi)
- Average elevation: 1,119 m
- Max. elevation: 1,549 m
- Min. elevation: 585 m
- Established: October 26, 1989

The Ebano Verde Scientific Reserve in the Dominican Republic was created on October 26, 1989 by Decree No. 417-89, Environment and Resources General Law 64-00, ratified by the Protected Areas Sectorial Law No. 202-04, ordered by then President Joaquin Balaguer.

Ebano Verde is the first in the nation to be administrated by the private Foundation for Human Betterment (Fundacion para el Mejoramiento Human) Progressio, that was established to guarantee the maintenance of the Cibao's hydric standards, assists with the preservation of the 29 km^{2} area designated to the reserve, an area which has expanded since the original 23 km^{2}.

The reserve is located on the eastern region of the Cordillera Central in the Province of La Vega and Monseñor Nouel, within the municipalities of Jarabacoa, Bonao, and Constanza, Dominican Republic.

The Ebano Verde (Magnolia pallescens) tree is a forest species that is endemic to the Dominican Republic and thrives exclusively in the Bosque Nublado (Clouded Forest), classified as a Very humid Lower Montane Forest (Bmh-MB).

== History ==
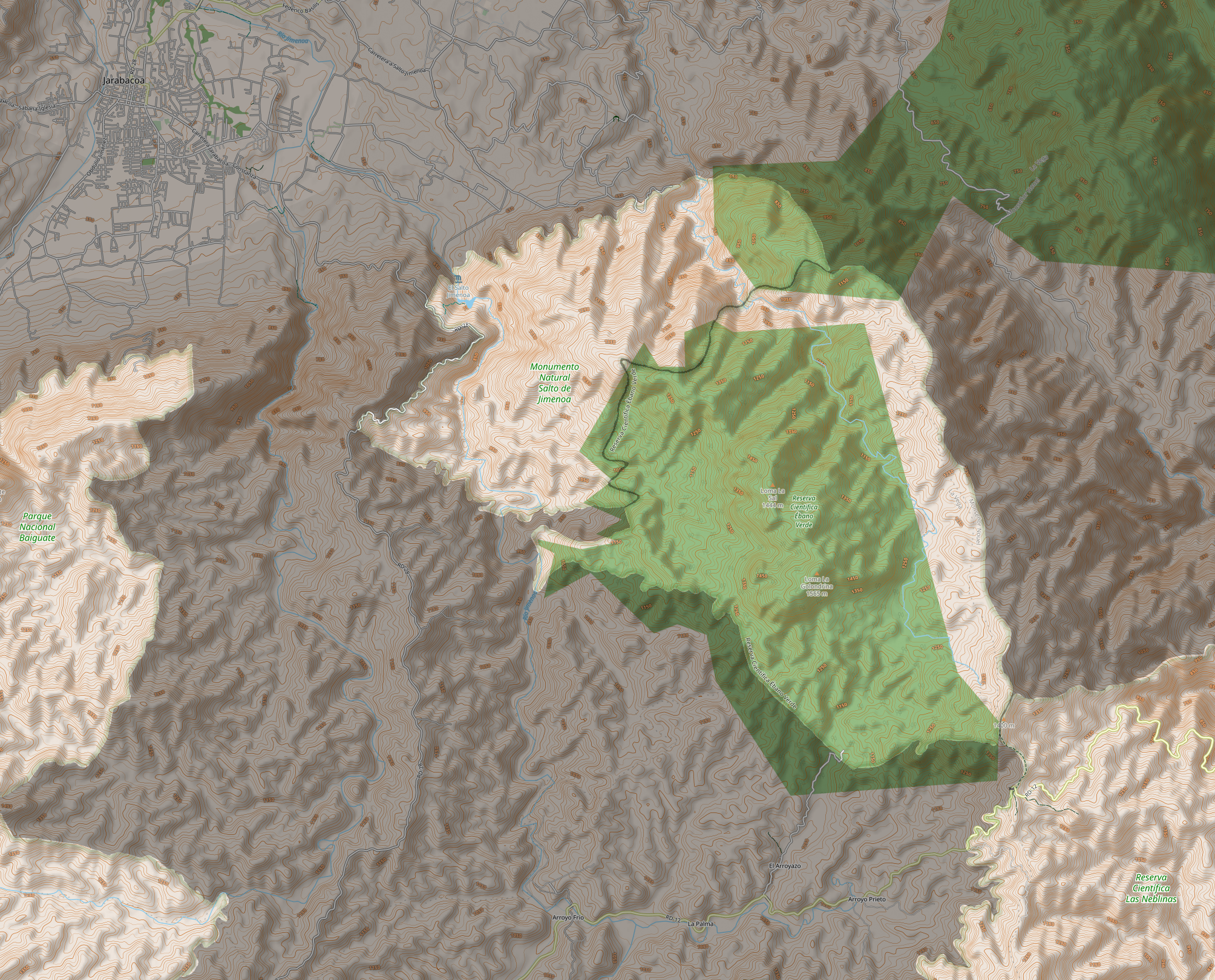
Ebano Verde Scientific Reserve Location

President of the Collado Foundation, Dr. Mario Collado, solicited the approval of the exploitation of Ebano Verde (Green Ebony) dead wood, due to the devastation that occurred on his property from Hurricane David and Tropical Storm Federico on the hills of La Golondrina and La Sal in the Cordillera Central. In order to extract the wood from the area, a system of thousands of cables had to be developed and installed that would not alter the ecological structure of the zone, and haul the dead lumber to the main roads. The King World Wide Company of Miami Florida had received news via Fax, of the existence of over 25,000,000 (25 Million) feet of lumber to be extracted.

On July 3, 1992, by order 15791 to the General Director of Forestry, Balaguer gave the authorization to Dr. Collado Laboratories to perform a removal and exploitation of the dead lumber of the Ebano (ebony) species, with 40% of the proceeds to Dr. Collado Laboratories and 60% to the Dominican State. A few days later of July 7, 1992, Balaguer formed a commission for the supervision, control, and exploitation of the dead lumber.

The Dominican Forestry Directorate was under much pressure, due to the amount of interests that would be generated from this project. There was only one signature left for the approval, that of the Director of Forestry, after all of the members of the commission had given their approval, when President Balaguer received news that the Secretary of Public Works had a tractor in the area, for the reparation of the neighboring road that leads to Palma de Constanza and unto Loma de la Golondrina, which hindered the extraction of wood. Balaguer's response was: "That has no validity, rejected, and set the tractor on fire".

Immediately, Secretary Eduardo Estrella of Public Works had been notified to remove the equipment that was at work in the Scientific Reserve, by orders of President Balaguer, ending the discussion and moving forward with the extraction.

== Geography ==
=== Hills ===
Located northwest of Casabito in Jarabacoa, Loma de la Golondrina (eng. Swallow Hill) is the highest elevation in the area, reaching 1,549 m above sea level, and according to the Holdrige System, vegetative life within the reserve is that of a very humid Lower Montane Forest (Bmh-MB), making it one of the most humid areas in the Dominican Republic.

The territory of Las Neblinas within the scientific reserve is made up of a geological formation denominated as Tireo, characterized as magmatic rocks and volcanic sediments from the superior Cretaceous period. The highest areas found in Las Neblinas are Loma La Lomita (1,182 m), Montellano (1,439 m), Prieta (1,023 m), Casabito (1,453 m), and La Sapa (1,230 m).

=== Rivers and streams ===
The hydrography of the Scientific Reserve and the surrounding areas are ones of great ecological importance, as Ebano Verde's La Sal, Bonito, and Arroyazo streams and water basins feed the rivers of Jimenoa, Camu, Jatubey, La Gina, Masipedro, Tireo and Tireito, La Piedra, Blanco, Pinar Bonito, Grande, and Palero, which supply the city of La Vega and the Tavera and Rincon Dams.

=== Trails ===
Within the Reserve are various trails and pathways, two of which are permitted to visitors: Sendero Baño de Nubes or Las Nubes (the clouds), and Sendero La Sal (the salt), descending through forests of Palo de Viento (Frodinia tremula) in between the hills that are covered with thick Fern of different species, including the Cyathea and Dicranopteris genus, leading to streams that are lined with Manacla or Palma de Sierra (Prestoea montana), comprising the areas of vegetation known as "Manaclares".

The only way to get through the Reserve is by hiking, due to the prohibition of animals such as horses and mules, which contaminate the soil with their droppings, eating and trampling over prohibited vegetation.

=== Climate ===
Ebano Verde is an area with heavy downpour, classified as high tropical mountain climate, with a registered amount of rainfall at 2,327 mm to 4,633 mm with an annual average of 3,853 mm. The lowest temperatures reach 11,4°C and a maximum of 20.4°C, with an average temperature of 16.3°C.

== Flora and fauna ==
=== Flora ===
According to reports, the flora in this natural protected area are made up of 621 species of vascular plants, of which 153 are highly endemic to La Hispaniola. The most prominent endemic species of flora that abounds in the area is the Ebano Verde (Green Ebony), Magnolia pallescens, a highly endangered precious wood tree.

Also extremely important, are the rarely mentioned species of Pinguicula casabitoana (a carnivorous plant), Gonocalyx tetraptera, Gesneria sylvicola, Lyonia alaini, and Myrcia saliana, as well as the palo de viento (Frodinia tremula), jaiqui (Bumelia salicifolia), pino criollo (Pinus occidentalis), sangre de pollo (Mecranium amigdalinum), and the palo santo (Alpinia speciosa).

=== Fauna ===
The Reserve's herpetofauna is composed of eight species of amphibians and ten species of reptiles. Among the mammals found are bats such as the Mexican free-tailed bat and the Hispaniolan solenodon, laying on the edge of extinction.

Some of the prominent birds within the Reserve are the cuca Hispaniolan amazon, Hispaniolan parakeet, limpkin (Aramus guarana elecus), ruddy quail-dove and the endangered rufous-collared sparrow.

In addition to these, other species include the Antillean euphonia, black-faced grassquit, Hispaniolan spindalis, yellow-throated warbler, black-throated blue warbler and black-throated green warbler, Cape May warbler, golden swallow, Hispaniolan emerald, Hispaniolan trogon, white-collared swift, plain pigeon, sharp-shinned hawk, Eastern chat-tanager, and greater Antillean elaenia.
