= Manifesto of Montecristi =

Official document of the Revolutionary Party in Cuba

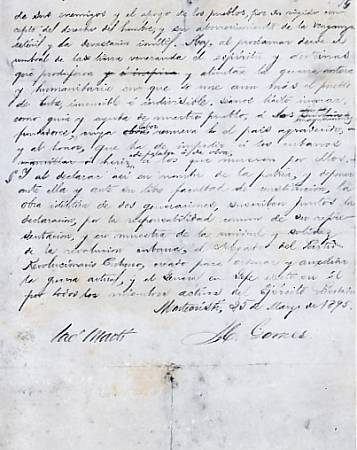
Montecristi document

The Manifesto of Montecristi is the official document of the Cuban Revolutionary Party; it was written by José Martí and signed by himself and Máximo Gómez on March 25, 1895 in Monte Cristi, Dominican Republic. In this document, José Martí exposed the causes that lead Cuba to fight against Spain to become an independent nation, free from economic or military control by any outside source. The "Manifesto of Montecristi" also clarifies that the war of liberation was not against Spain itself, but against the colonial regime that existed on the island for more than three centuries.

== The Cuban War of Independence ==
The Cuban War of Independence (or War of 1895) is the name of the final war of independence fought by Cubans against Imperial Spain. It was also the final war for independence fought in the Americas. The conflict began on 24 February, 1895, when 35 Cuban towns simultaneously rose up against Spanish rule in what has become known as the Grito de Baire ). The war lasted until August of 1898, when the entry of the United States into the conflict led to the defeat of the Spanish. In Spain, the war is known as "The Cuban War," while José Martí and revolutionaries deemed it the "Necessary War."

== Ten Years' War ==
The Cuban fight for independence began with the Ten Years' War (1868–1878), the first of three wars fought as Cuba attempted to free themselves from Spanish rule. The war was brought on by an economic crisis (1866) as well as the desire to end slavery. While the farmers in Cuba struggled to feed their families, the colonial administration continued to bring in profit from military ventures. In response, enraged farmers rose to fight.

The uprising started October 10. Though efforts nearly failed within the first few days, within weeks the numbers of volunteers reached 12,000. Soon, Maximo Gomez (a former cavalry officer for the Spanish army) joined the farmer’s fight, bringing a tactical advantage to the rebels.

Eventually, rebels took over the city of Bayamo, making a significant victory that brought hope to the people. It was at this time, Cuba’s national anthem was composed. Within three months Bayamo was again seized by the Spanish, but by that time the city had been burned to the ground. As the war spread over the country, Gomez was replaced, but after the threat of ethnic cleansing, Gomez returned to his position.

After time, the Cuban people held a constitutional assembly on April 10, 1869 in an attempt to create a new government for themselves. During the assembly, it was determined that a separation between military and civilian affairs would exist. While this was concluded rather peacefully between the people of Cuba, it resulted in the Spanish raging a war of extermination. In the end, 17 years of tension would exists between Cuba and Spain.

== The Little War ==
Following the Ten Years' War, the Little War(1879–1880) began. Starting August 26, 1879 and led by Calixto Garcia as well as veterans from the Ten Years' War, the Cuban people once again attempted to rise against Spanish rule as the Cuban Revolutionary Committee was created. While the Little War was a continuation of the Ten Years' War, the Cuban people lacked leadership, supplies and motivation to achieve any true victories. Instead, the Cuban people simply hoped for a peaceful settlement with Spain. The war ended September 1880, as revolutionary leaders were arrested and the rebels were defeated.

Following the Little War, Spain did little to follow through with their promises of reform. While Cuba was able to send representatives to the Spanish parliament, this brought no real change to the daily life of the Cuban people.

== Jose Marti ==
After the Little War and preceding the Spanish–American War, rebel José Martí started to become a prominent figure in the fight for freedom. At age 18, Marti was sent into exile by the Spanish due to his radical political views. Following his second exile, he traveled to the United States where he worked to establish the Cuban Revolutionary Party as a force to be reckoned with. In 1895, Marti wrote and signed the Manifesto de Montecristi along with Máximo Gómez, outlining what he hoped would become Cuba’s declaration of independence, setting Cuba free from Spanish rule, as well as improving the economy and bringing equality to the country. Following the singing of the document in Montecristi, Marti returned to Cuba to fight alongside the rebels. Shortly after, he was killed in battle.

== The Manifesto of Montecristi ==
Cuba’s revolution of independence, which initiated in Yara, has entered a new period of war. Cuba’s war of independence is not only for the good and the benefit of Cuba and America, but for the benefit of the world itself. The elected leaders of the revolution today confirm, admit, and recognize their obligation and duty, which is to let Cuba know that their homeland will not be bloodied without a reason or without a hope of triumph. Cuba is embarking upon this war with full certainty, of the capacity and ability of the Cuban people, to save the patria and to obtain their liberty and govern its independence. Cubans return to war with more educated and capable individuals, which are willing to fight, even though they know the dangers that this war represent, to help Cuba to become an independent nation, free from the intervention and the abuses of the Spanish regime or of any outside source.

The revolutionary war is not the a capricious tentative of an independence more fearsome than useful, neither the triumph of one Cuban Political Party over another, or even the humiliation of one group of Cubans, which are mistaken in their beliefs or decisions, but the demonstration of the will of a nation that accomplished too much in the last war to get involved into a conflict that will just end in victory or defeat, without very deep causes to stand against human cowardice and its many disguises.

This war is not against the Spaniard, who will be respected and even loved, and who will enjoy the liberty that will sweep away only from those who try to block its path. This war will not be a cradle of tyranny or disorder, which shows the moderation of Cubans. They will show respect to all the honorable Spaniard who remain neutral and do not oppose, or who even help, to the war of independence against the colonial regime over the island. However, the ones who oppose the war of liberation will be bloodied and persecuted; the Cubans started the war, and the Cubans and Spaniards should finish it. We will treat respect with respect, mistreat with mistreat, war with war, and friendship with friendship.

There is another intolerable and unjustified thought, which the revolution wants to profit now: the senseless fear of the black race. Cuba, the revolution, all its heroes and martyrs, now deny the notion of any threat by the Negro race; this nonsense thought was inspired by the Spanish regime, for their benefit and to stir up fear in those individuals seeking for the revolutionary war. In Cuba, there are many inhabitants of one color or another; there are many white Cuba's sons who have forgotten their duty to their homeland and their patria. Why do novelty and a social status are more important for white men than the humanity, integrity, intelligence and even the life of a black compatriot? The revolution knows and proclaims that the black race should have the same rights as any other individual in Cuba; since they have demonstrated their intelligence and their virtue. Upon the shoulders of the black man, the republic of Cuba has moved in safety. Montecristi, 25 de Marzo de 1895. José Martí, M. Gómez

=== General view of the document ===
To outline the Manifesto of Montecristi José Martí and Máximo Gómez stated that the war was to be waged by blacks and whites alike. It is to include the participation of all blacks in which it was very much crucial for the victory of war. Also, Spaniards who did not object to the war effort should be spared, since they choose to not involve themselves. No collateral damage should be done, private rural properties shall remain. With the end of the war, the revolution of the country shall bring new economic life to Cuba.

=== After the document ===
Of the many contributions that José Martí has brought into Cuba, his spirit still lives on. In 1921 lawmakers that came from Matanzas, and Santa Clara, offered a bill that declares José Martí's birthday a national holiday. The bill was passed with much empathy, and was renowned as "The Law that Glorifies the Apostle." With hardship came praise, and the newly made law ordered the requirement that "All municipalities dedicate not only a principal street in every town to Marti, but also a statue, bust, obelisk, commemorative column, bronze plaque or stone tablet" on public property. Not only did this law order principal streets or statues in name of him, but it includes that on an annual basis schoolchildren must offer tribute with flowers at any commemorative area where songs and verses were recited. People who attended listen to panegyrics from the many speakers that come.

== Sources ==
- Mauricio Augusto Font, Alfonso W. Quiroz. The Cuban Republic and José Martí: reception and use of a national symbol. Pg 34
- Ignacio Ramonet, Fidel Castro. Castro: My Life: A Spoken Autobiography. Pg 148
