= Constanza, Dominican Republic =

Constanza
- Town
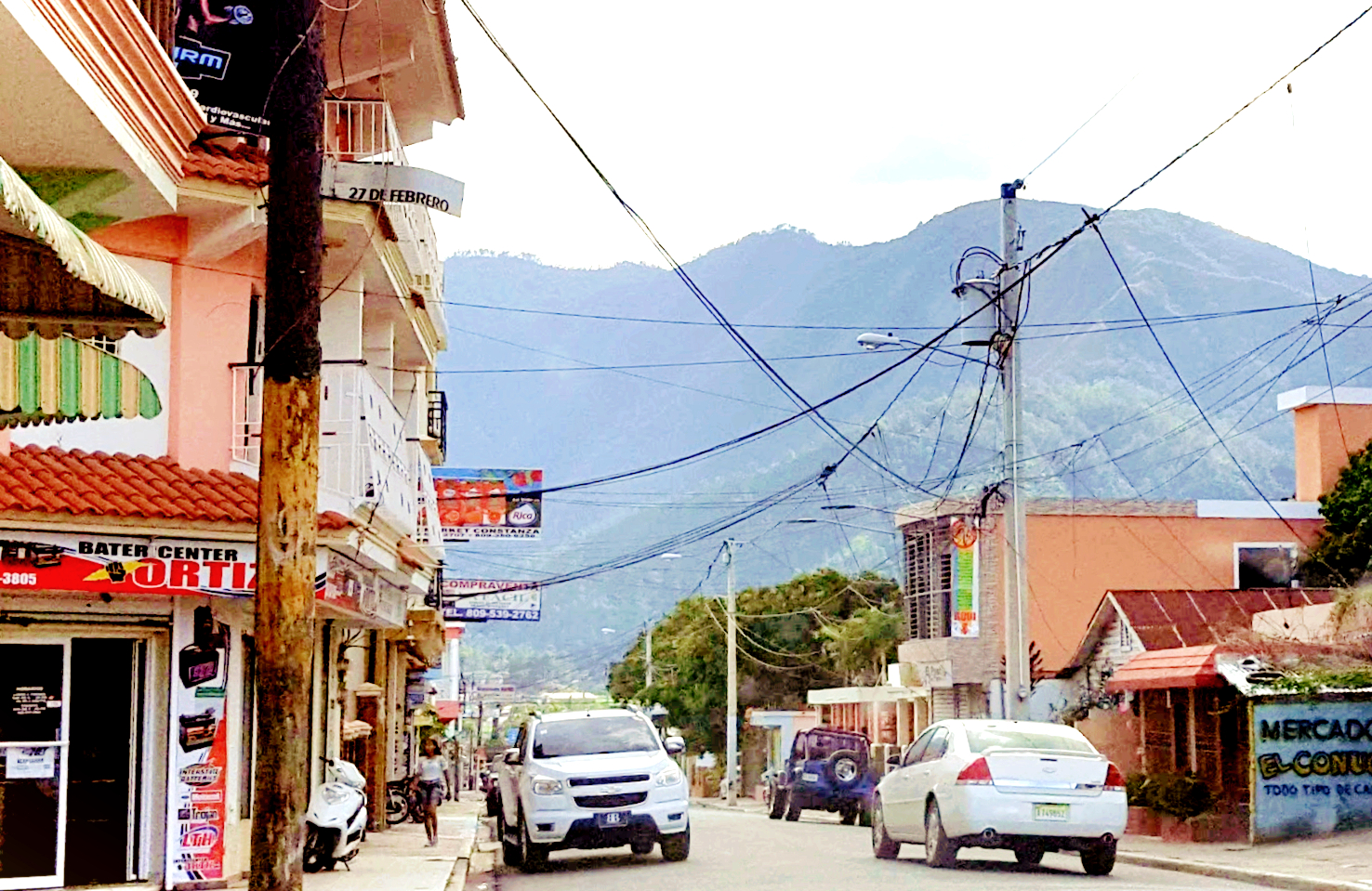
- Street view of Constanza, Dominican Republic

- Location in the Dominican Republic
- Coordinates: 18°54′36″N 70°45′0″W
- Country: Dominican Republic
- Province: La Vega

Area
  - Total: 848.79 km^{2} (327.72 sq mi)
- Elevation: 1,164 m (3,819 ft)

Population (2010)
  - Total: 59,052
  - Density: 69.572/km^{2} (180.19/sq mi)
  - Urban: 25,683
  - Demonym: Constantian (Spanish: constanceño)
- Time zone: UTC-04:00 (AST)
- Distance to – Santo Domingo: 140 km
- Municipal Districts: 2
- Climate: Cfb

Constanza is a town and municipality in La Vega Province, Dominican Republic. Located in the Cordillera Central region, Constanza is known for having the coldest average temperature for a settlement on the island of Hispaniola, as well as the entire Caribbean.

== History ==
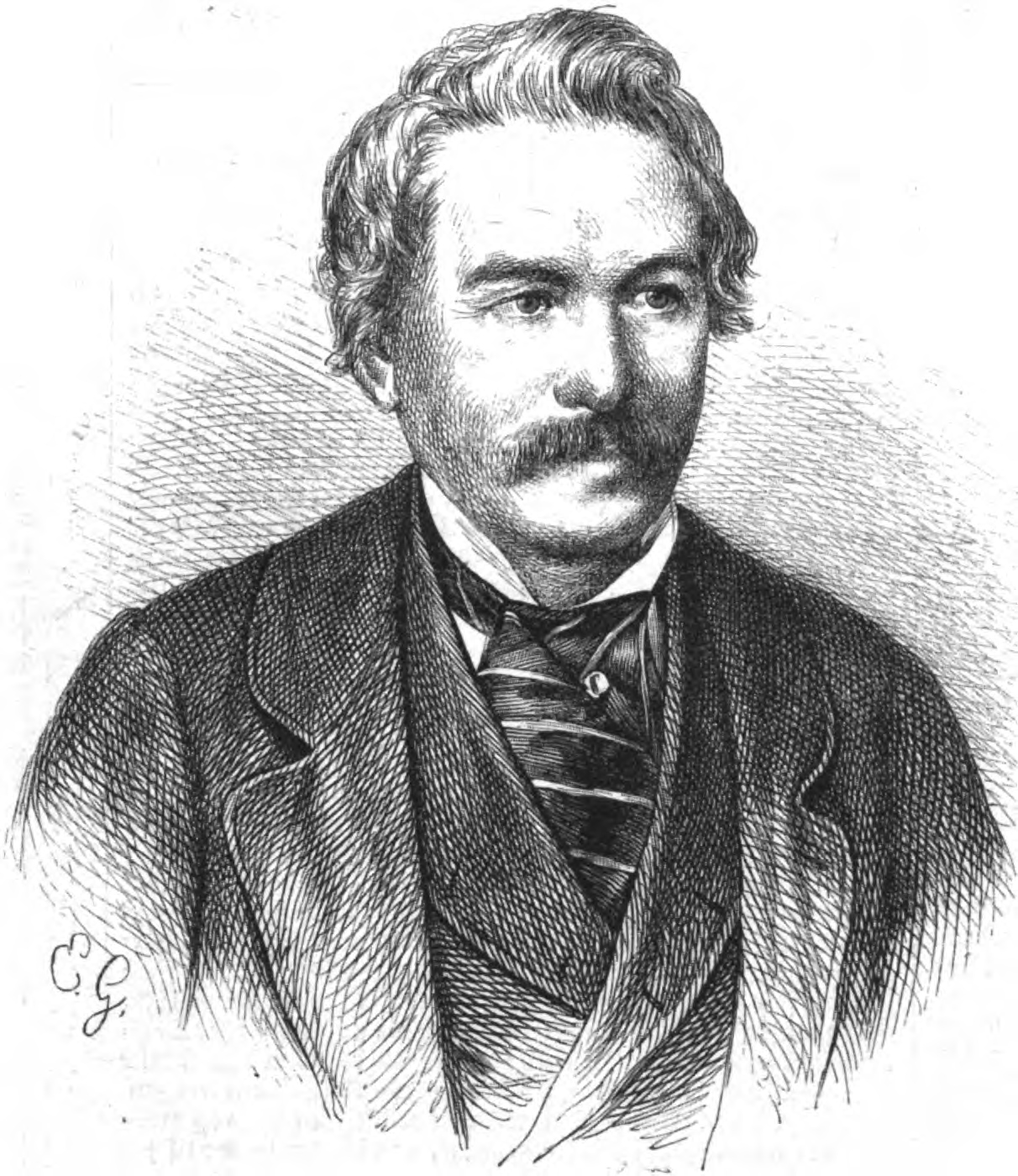
Sir Robert Schomburgk

The name of Constanza has its origin in the legend the daughter of a local Native Taíno chief who lived in the valley. Constanza was a sparsely populated area, though several explorers knew the valley in colonial times, and there was a settler named Victoriano Velano who brought European agriculture and ranching culture to the area in 1750.

In 1852, the German-British explorer and consul Sir Robert Hermann Schomburgk mentioned the existence of a farm in the valley of Constanza on his way through the region. The town was formally founded in 1894. It was incorporated into a municipality in La Vega Province on September 9, 1907.

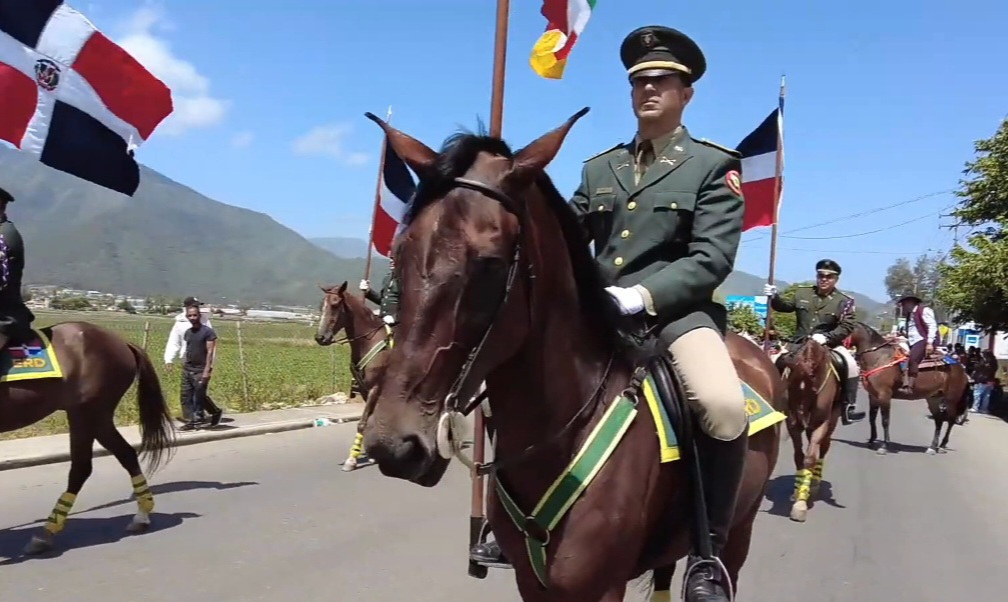
Constanza, Dominican Republic downtown parade

On June 14, 1959, a plane landed on a Constanza airstrip with more than forty rebels with the purpose of killing the dictator of the time Rafael Trujillo and starting a communist revolution in the Dominican Republic. They fought guerrilla warfare in the nearby mountains against the Dominican Army for two months before the armed forces managed to end the rebellion by killing all the rebels.

== Geography ==
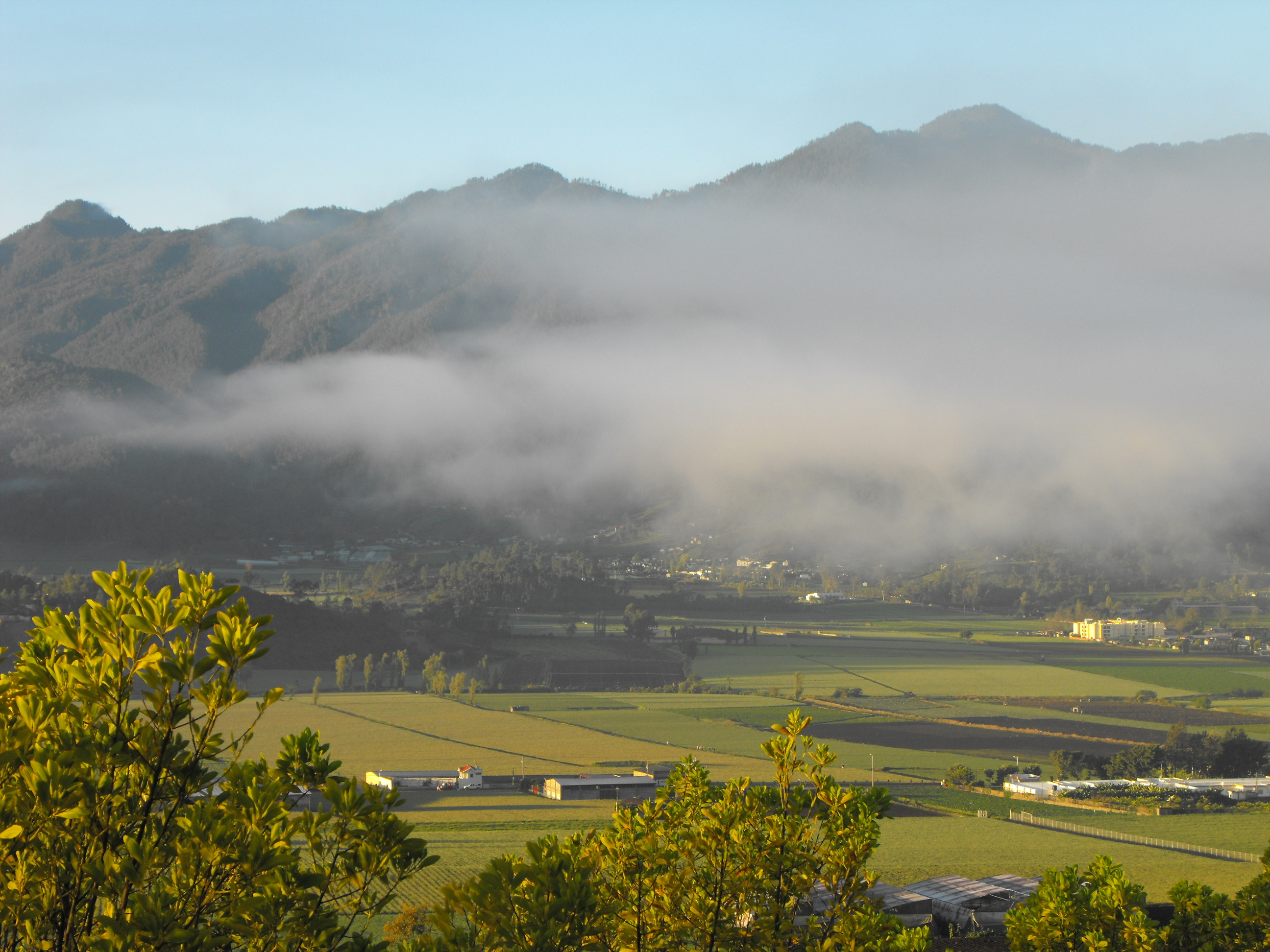
Valley of Constanza.

The town of Constanza is located at a height of 1220 meters (4000 ft) above sea level in the middle of the Cordillera Central (Central Range), the tallest mountain range in the island of Hispaniola and the entire Caribbean region. The annual average temperatures range from 41 °F (5 °C) to 68 °F (20 °C), depending on altitude and time of year. The valley is 8 km long and 4 km wide.

=== Climate ===
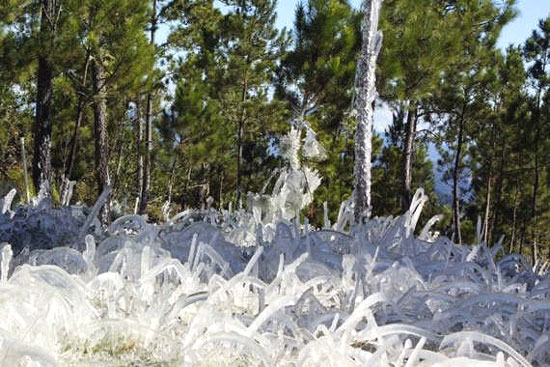
Frosted Hispaniolan pine forest in Valle Nuevo National Park.

Its climate is a temperate oceanic or subtropical highland climate (Köppen Climate Classification Cfb), with cool temperatures and rainfall throughout the year. The average annual temperature varies from less than 10 °C in highlands to 18 °C in town.

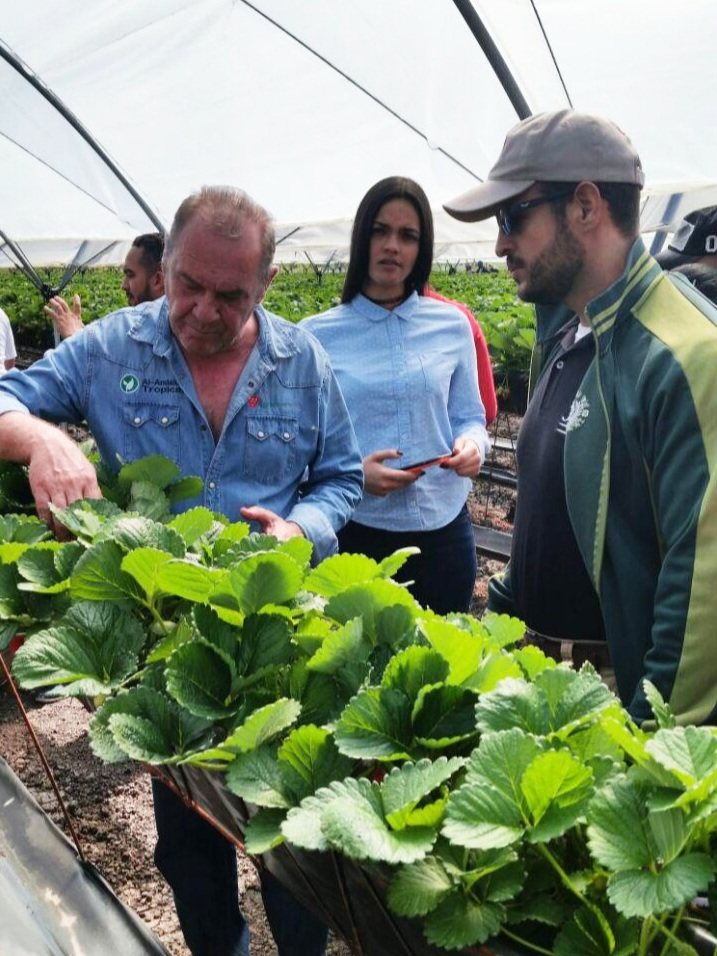
People in Constanza, Dominican Republic countryside farm.

In summer, temperatures range between 25 °C to 27 °C during the day, and between 12 °C to 15 °C at night. Wildfires are relatively frequent. In winter, the temperatures are between 21 and 24 °C at day, and 8 to 12 °C at night. Fog is quite common. The last time that Constanza had freezing temperatures was in 1958; while in Valle Nuevo freezes are not unusual.

The highest temperature ever recorded in town was 32.5 °C, on October 3, 1957. The coldest temperature was –1 °C, recorded on February 6, 1958.

Climate data for Constanza (2022) (COZ—Expedición 14 de Junio Airport; 1.164 m)
Month	Jan	Feb	Mar	Apr	May	Jun	Jul	Aug	Sep	Oct	Nov	Dec	Year
Record high °C (°F)	25.1 (77.2)	23.7 (74.7)	24.4 (75.9)	25.2 (77.4)	27.1 (80.8)	27.7 (81.9)	27.3 (81.1)	27.4 (81.3)	26.5 (79.7)	27.0 (80.6)	25.6 (78.1)	24.0 (75.2)	27.4 (81.3)
Mean daily maximum °C (°F)	23.1 (73.6)	21.0 (69.8)	22.3 (72.1)	23.1 (73.6)	23.8 (74.8)	25.4 (77.7)	25.2 (77.4)	25.0 (77.0)	24.7 (76.5)	23.8 (74.8)	23.4 (74.1)	22.9 (73.2)	23.5 (74.3)
Daily mean °C (°F)	17.9 (64.2)	17.7 (63.9)	18.3 (64.9)	18.8 (65.8)	19.7 (67.5)	20.8 (69.4)	20.1 (68.2)	20.5 (68.9)	20.6 (69.1)	20.0 (68.0)	18.7 (65.7)	17.7 (63.9)	18.9 (66.0)
Mean daily minimum °C (°F)	13.3 (55.9)	13.2 (55.8)	14.6 (58.3)	14.9 (58.8)	15.4 (59.7)	15.8 (60.4)	15.7 (60.3)	16.3 (61.3)	17.6 (63.7)	16.0 (60.8)	14.5 (58.1)	12.8 (55.0)	14.5 (58.1)
Record low °C (°F)	9.2 (48.6)	10.0 (50.0)	10.9 (51.6)	12.8 (55.0)	12.4 (54.3)	14.0 (57.2)	14.1 (57.4)	14.9 (58.8)	15.6 (60.1)	14.0 (57.2)	11.2 (52.2)	9.7 (49.5)	9.2 (48.6)
Average rainfall mm (inches)	26.9 (1.06)	31.2 (1.23)	36.4 (1.43)	57.8 (2.28)	167.5 (6.59)	96.1 (3.78)	64.3 (2.53)	133.4 (5.25)	128.5 (5.06)	102.0 (4.02)	70.7 (2.78)	41.8 (1.65)	956.6 (37.66)
Average rainy days	4	6	7	11	16	12	13	13	15	14	12	6	129
Mean monthly sunshine hours	191.1	173.2	180.6	163.6	164.8	202.8	178.4	200.1	212.5	206.6	165.8	190.1	2,229.6
Source 1: National Bureau of Meteorology (ONAMET) (in Spanish): January; February (Record low temperature: −1 °C Centro de Información Gubernamental—Ministerio de la Presidencia); March; April; May; June; July; August; September; October; November; December
Source 2: freemeteo.com — acqweather.com

Climate data for Valle Nuevo, Constanza (Weather station; 2.260 m)
Month	Jan	Feb	Mar	Apr	May	Jun	Jul	Aug	Sep	Oct	Nov	Dec	Year
Mean daily maximum °C (°F)	16.0 (60.8)	17.8 (64.0)	18.9 (66.0)	19.0 (66.2)	18.3 (64.9)	19.0 (66.2)	20.7 (69.3)	20.4 (68.7)	20.0 (68.0)	19.0 (66.2)	18.1 (64.6)	18.0 (64.4)	19 (66)
Daily mean °C (°F)	6.0 (42.8)	10.1 (50.2)	11.1 (52.0)	11.7 (53.1)	11.4 (52.5)	12.9 (55.2)	13.0 (55.4)	14.0 (57.2)	14.7 (58.5)	13.0 (55.4)	11.1 (52.0)	10.2 (50.4)	12.9 (55.2)
Mean daily minimum °C (°F)	2.3 (36.1)	2.8 (37.0)	3.9 (39.0)	4.5 (40.1)	6.1 (43.0)	6.0 (42.8)	7.1 (44.8)	8.7 (47.7)	7.9 (46.2)	7.6 (45.7)	5.0 (41.0)	3.5 (38.3)	5.0 (41.0)
Record low °C (°F)	−3.5 (25.7)	−3.0 (26.6)	−7.5 (18.5)	3.8 (38.8)	4.0 (39.2)	4.9 (40.8)	4.9 (40.8)	6.8 (44.2)	6.0 (42.8)	5.6 (42.1)	−1.3 (29.7)	0.7 (33.3)	−7.5 (18.5)

== Economy ==
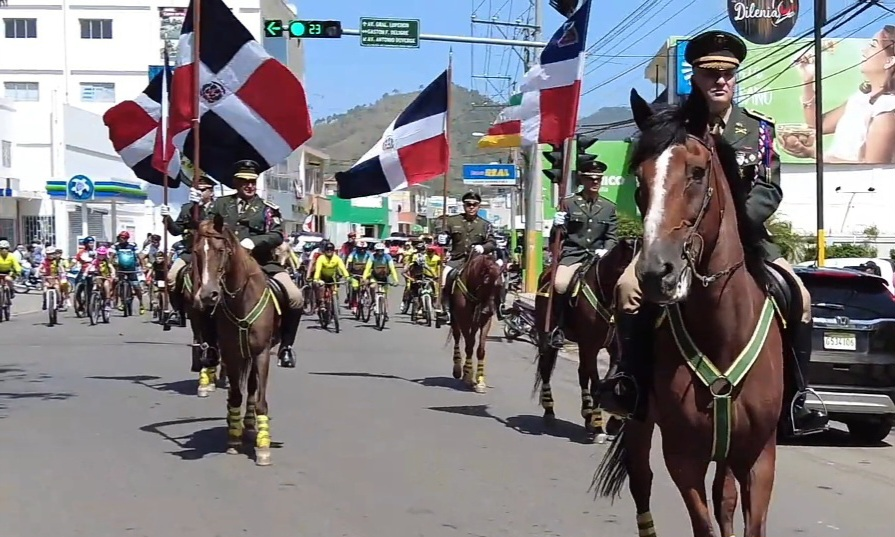
Downtown parade in the streets of Constanza, Dominican Republic

The local economy is based on its robust agricultural industry. It has a high production of vegetables and fruits including strawberries, peaches, apples, garlic and potato and other temperate crops due to its unique climate. Due to this, the town of Constanza alone contributes to 4% of the national GDP, while having less than 1% of the Dominican population making it one of the most prosperous municipalities in the country per capita.

== Tourism ==
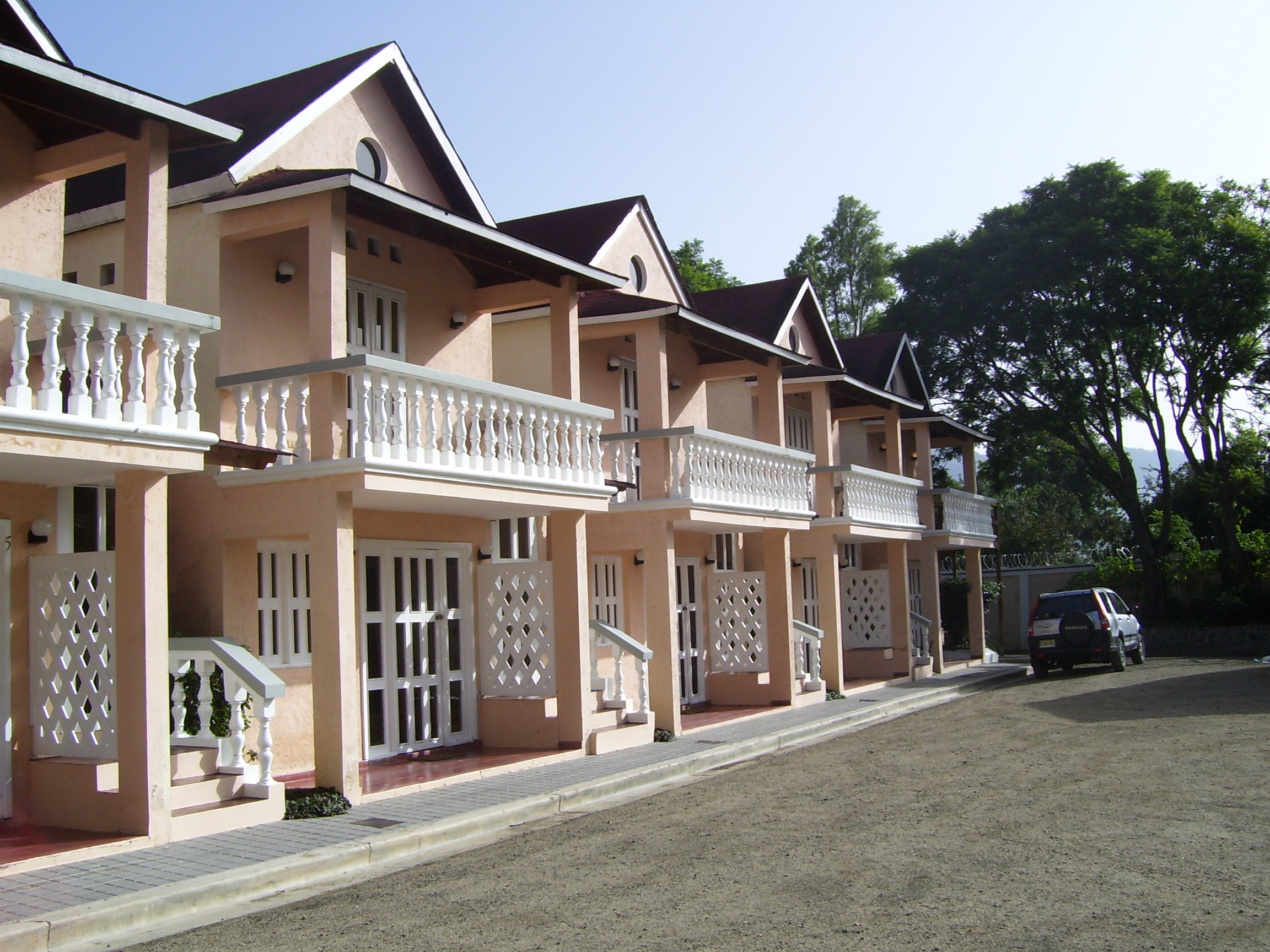
Cabañas in town of Constanza.

Constanza is known for its remarkable mountain climate despite being located in a tropical island. Local tourism is rampant during the winter time. Throughout the rest of the year it is visited because of its proximity to the Ebano Verde Scientific Reserve and also to have the nearest route to the Pico Duarte, the tallest mountain in the country, island, and Caribbean.

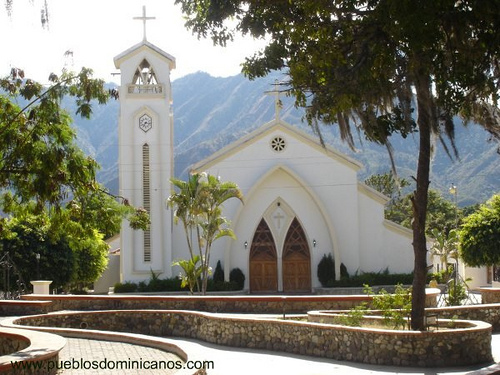
Church of Constanza.

== Ecology ==
The nearby Ebano Verde Scientific Reserve is the stronghold of the widest variety of flora and fauna of Hispaniola. The mountains surrounding the valley of Constanza are covered in Hispaniolan pine (Pinus occidentalis) forests. Typical endemic fauna seen in the area includes the Hispaniolan palm crow, Antillean siskin, rufous-throated solitaire, Hispaniolan crossbill (whose abundance is directly related to pine cone crop), and Hispaniolan trogon, while at lower elevations the Hispaniolan parrot, scaly-naped pigeon and golden swallow can be seen, many of which are endangered species.

== Transportation ==
The town can be reached either by local airlines through the Constanza Airport or through local bus companies.

== Demographics ==
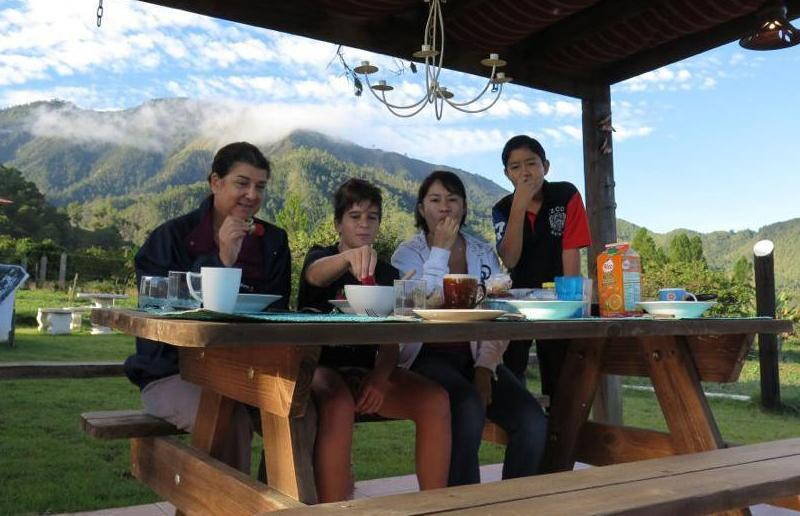
Japanese-Dominicans in Constanza

Constanza has 59,052 inhabitants. A large part of its population descends from Spanish immigrants (from Burgos, Palencia and Vizcaya), Hungarians, and Japanese, as well as a smaller number of Arabs, Jews, and Chinese.

The migrants of Constanza usually lived in neighborhoods where they retained the customs of their ancestors. The three most prominent and particular colonies are the Spanish colony, a few meters from the entrance of the city, the Hungarian Colony, to the southeast, and the Japanese Colony, to the south on the road that leads to Valle Nuevo and San José de Ocoa. ~40% of Constanza is of full or almost complete European descent, identifying as white.
