= Monte Cristi Pipe Wreck =

Underwater archaeological site in the Dominican Republic

Coordinates: 19°53′18″N 71°39′55″W

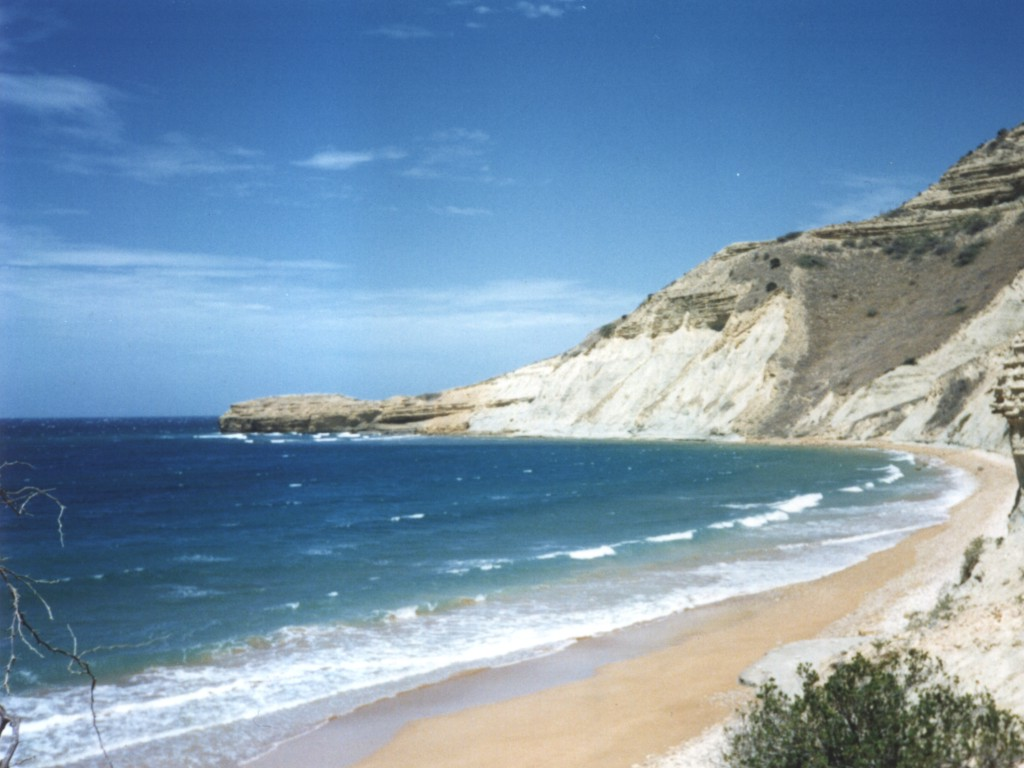
Monte Cristi coastline

Location of Monte Cristi Bay in the Dominican Republic

Monte Cristi Pipe Wreck is a submerged archaeological site located off the north coast of Hispaniola in the Dominican Republic near the border of Haiti, part of the Greater Antilles in the Caribbean. The site is one of the hundreds of historic shipwrecks that lie on the ocean floor between Monte Cristi and Puerto Plata.

Archaeological evidence indicates that the shipwreck is one of a merchant trader, probably sinking in the second half of the 17th century. Hispaniola, together with Jamaica, was originally settled by adventurous men seeking the life of a buccaneer, and until the 18th century, these islands thrived through piracy rather than through growing sugar. The historical and geological information together indicates that the ship was likely to have been a buccaneer vessel headed to the Americas most likely for the Upper Hudson River Valley.

This wreck is known as the "Pipe Wreck" because of the large number of clay smoking pipes it carried as cargo, the type of long pipe the indigenous inhabitants used to smoke tobacco that was a shaped cane and called tobago.

== Location ==
The wreck lies at a depth of 4.4 metres (14 ft), in a bed of sea grass 80 metres (260 ft) off the northeastern bulge of Isla Cabra at the northern side of Monte Cristi Bay.

Five large masses are visible, covered by a layer of calcium carbonate. Three of the objects seem to be combinations of iron and copper-alloy, and two appear to be solid slabs of iron. The calcium carbonate furnishes ample material for the reef ecosystem that covers the existing hull.

== Artifacts ==
The finding included a large number of clay tobacco smoking pipes, as well as ceramics, trade goods, and luxury imports. Most of the ceramics found were mottled-brown salt-glazed fragments known as Rhenish stoneware from Germany and popular during the 16th and 17th centuries.

== See also ==
- Archaeology of shipwrecks
- Piracy in the Caribbean
