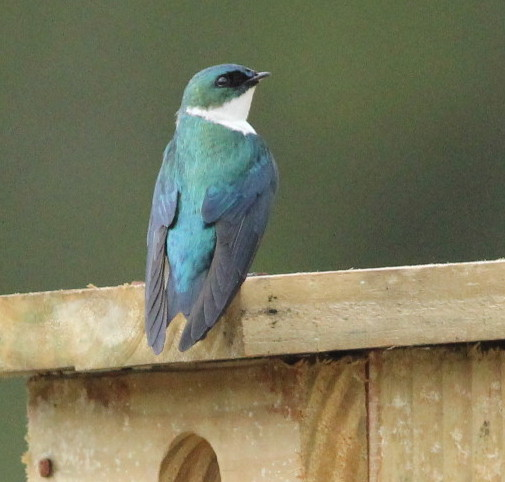
- Adult in the Dominican Republic

Conservation status
- Vulnerable (IUCN 3.1)

Scientific classification
- Kingdom: Animalia
- Phylum: Chordata
- Class: Aves
- Order: Passeriformes
- Family: Hirundinidae
- Genus: Tachycineta
- Species: T. euchrysea

Binomial name
- Tachycineta euchrysea (Gosse, 1847)

Subspecies
- T. e. sclateri †T. e. euchrysea
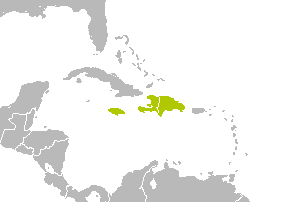
- Former range in yellow (only extant on Hispaniola)

Synonyms
- Hirundo sclateri Cory, 1884

= Golden swallow =

Species of bird

The golden swallow (Tachycineta euchrysea) is a swallow endemic to the Caribbean island of Hispaniola (split between the Dominican Republic and Haiti) and was once native to Jamaica, but is now extirpated there. It is restricted to isolated montane forests that primarily consist of the Hispaniolan pine (Pinus occidentalis). This species is considered to be a vulnerable species by the International Union for Conservation of Nature (IUCN). The exact cause of its extirpation from Jamaica is unknown, but likely factors include predation by introduced mammals and habitat loss, although the habitat loss theory is not supported by much evidence. The last sighting of the nominate subspecies was in Hardwar Gap (located on the boundary between Saint Andrew and Portland parishes), with three birds being seen on 8 June 1989.

A relatively small swallow, the Jamaican subspecies had bronze upperparts and bronze sides of the head. The ears and lores were duller and the forehead area was more green than bronze. The shoulders, back, rump, and uppertail-coverts were, on the other hand, a coppery-bronze colour. The lesser and median coverts were more coppery, with the greater and primary-wing-coverts more of a dusky green. The primaries, secondaries, and tail were a dusky bronze-green. The underparts were mostly white. The legs, feet, and irides were dark brown, and the bill was black. The female was similar, but with its breast, and occasionally throat and undertail-coverts, mottled grey-brown. The juvenile was also mottled-grey brown, and duller overall. The Hispaniolan subspecies, T. e. sclateri, is primarily differentiated by its more deeply forked tail, blue-green forehead and uppertail-coverts, and blue-black wings and tail.

In Hispaniola, this swallow breeds from April to July, where it lays a clutch consisting of two to four white eggs. It formerly bred from June to July in Jamaica. The eggs are laid in a cup nest that is mainly found in Hispaniolan pine. It also nests in caves, under the eaves of houses, in burned stands, and in nest boxes. This swallow is an aerial insectivore, foraging for insects at heights that are usually under 20 m (66 ft), and very rarely at heights over 30 m (98 ft). When foraging, it is known to explore most habitats except forests.

== Taxonomy and etymology ==
The golden swallow was first described as Hirundo euchrysea by English naturalist Henry Gosse, in his 1847 book The Birds of Jamaica, many years after European settlement of the island. Early naturalists were not aware of this species. The current genus Tachycineta, on the other hand, was originally described in 1850 by the ornithologist Jean Cabanis. The binomial name is from Ancient Greek. Tachycineta is from takhukinetos, "moving quickly", and the specific euchrysea is from eukhrusos, meaning "rich in gold". This is derived from eu, meaning "plenty", and khruseios, meaning "golden".

This species has two subspecies; the second, Tachycineta euchrysea sclateri, was originally suspected of being a distinct species by Henry Bryant in 1866, who recorded it as "var. dominicensis?" and noted differences in plumage from the nominate subspecies in Jamaica. However, his report lacked a species description. It was finally described as Hirundo sclateri in 1884 by American ornithologist Charles Cory, who felt it distinct enough to warrant separate species status. The subspecies name sclateri is dedicated to Philip Sclater, an English zoologist. The nominate subspecies, T. e. euchrysea, is extinct.

This swallow, along with the violet-green swallow and Bahama swallow, comprise a clade. It is also considered to be of the subgenus Tachycineta, the nominate subgenus, in addition to the violet-green swallow, Bahama swallow, and tree swallow.

== Description ==
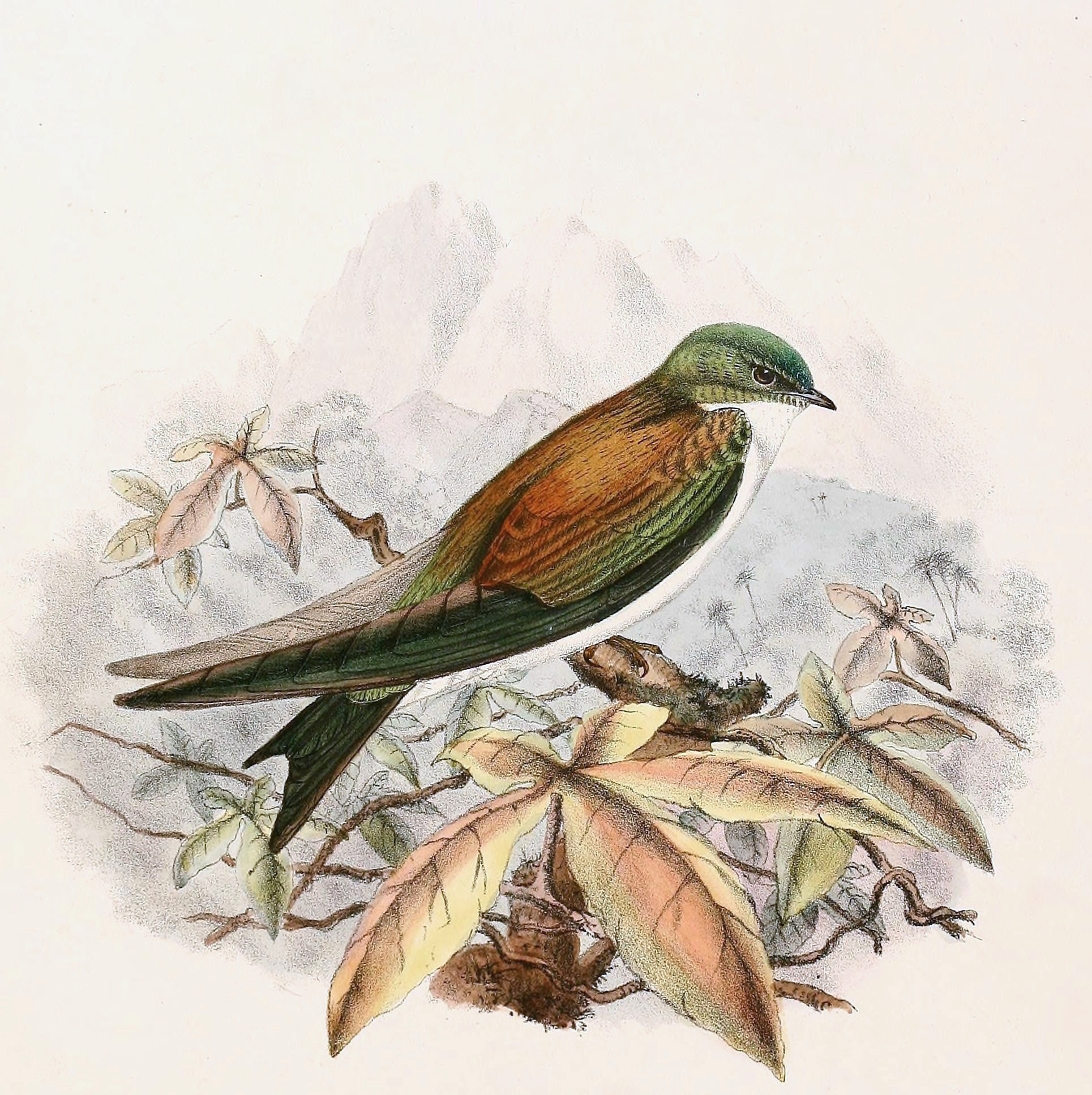
The extinct nominate subspecies, T. e. euchrysea

A small swallow, the golden swallow measures, on average, 12 cm (4.7 in). The adult of the nominate subspecies' upperparts, including the sides of the head, the cheek, and the chin, are an iridescent bronze. The ear coverts and lores are duller, and the forehead, crown, and nape are more green. This contrasts with the golden or coppery-bronze colouring of the mantle, shoulders, back, rump, and uppertail-coverts. The lesser and median-coverts are more coppery, with the greater and primary wing-coverts being more green and dusky. The edges of the greater coverts and tertials are more golden. The primaries, secondaries, tail, axillaries, and underwing-coverts are dusky bronze-green, with the axillaries and underwing-coverts having this colour only on the edges. The tail is only slightly forked on the nominate subspecies, unlike the more deeply forked tail of the other subspecies, sclateri. Its underparts are white, with dusky bronze streaks on the flanks. The legs and the feet are dark brown and the bill is black. Its irides are also dark brown. The female is similar, although some of the underparts, specifically the breast and occasionally the throat and undertail-coverts, are mottled grey-brown. The mottling around the breast and collar is likely to decrease over time. The juvenile, like the female, is mottled grey-brown. The juvenile also has less glossy plumage and the sides of its head are a dusky grey.

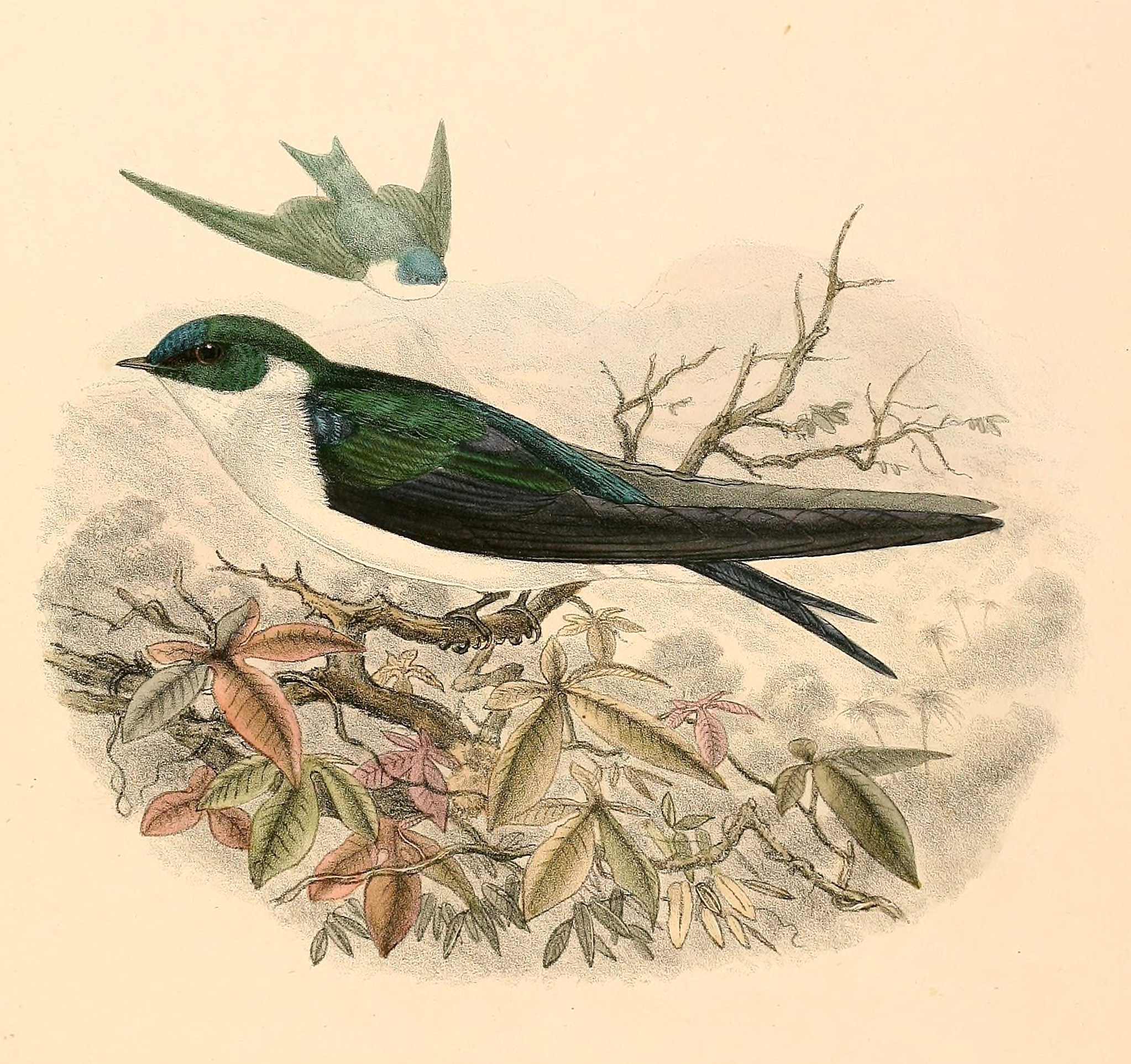
Sketch of the subspecies T. e. sclateri

The other subspecies, sclateri, has slightly longer wings and a smaller bill. The plumage is less golden, with the forehead and uppertail-coverts being blue-green, and with both the wings and tail being blue-black. The underparts of T. e. sclateri also vary in being pure white without streaks.

This bird has a soft, two-note call, often described as a tchee-weet, that is repeated.

== Distribution and habitat ==
The golden swallow is native to the island of Hispaniola, and formerly Jamaica. The subspecies that resided in Jamaica, Tachycineta euchrysea euchrysea, is extinct. It was found up to elevations of 2,000 m (6,600 ft), from sea level on Jamaica, and currently found from 800 m (2,600 ft) on Hispaniola. It is likely that this species, when not breeding, moves down to lower altitudes. The estimated extent of occurrence for this swallow is 8,100 km^{2} (3,100 mi^{2}). Primarily inhabiting hills of the interior of islands, this swallow prefers open country, but will occasionally be seen in forests and over towns. It is restricted to patches of montane forest that consist primarily of Hispaniolan pine. Never common in Jamaica, it was restricted to mountainous limestone country in the island's interior.

== Behaviour ==
=== Breeding ===
The golden swallow usually builds its deep cup nest in dead snags, especially those of the Hispaniolan pine, in holes created by woodpeckers, primarily the Hispaniolan woodpecker. It also nests in caves, under the eaves of houses, and in recently burned stands. The nests are made with fine vegetable fibres like silk, cotton, and pappus, with the seeds being broken off from the fibres. The nests are lined with cotton, silk, and feathers. One nest had a diameter of about 12 cm (4.7 in), and a depth of about 5 cm (2.0 in).

The breeding season occurred from June to July in Jamaica, and occurs from April to July in Hispaniola. When breeding, the golden swallow usually nests in pairs and occasionally will nest in colonies. This swallow is not known to compete for nests with any other birds. The only species, an insect, that is known to inhabit nest boxes occupied by golden swallows is Polyancistrus loripes, a species of katydid. Only about 9.6% of nesting attempts are second nesting attempts, although this number may be low.

The clutch of this swallow is two to four white to creamy white eggs with little spotting. The eggs measure around 18.4 mm × 13.1 mm (0.72 in × 0.52 in), and weigh 1.7 g (0.060 oz) on average. They are generally laid one per day, although there are instances of the female skipping a day in laying. The incubation period ranges from 17 to 20 days, with the female incubating the young. The young usually fledge 24 to 27 days after they hatch.

=== Diet ===
This species is an aerial insectivore, usually feeding on flies, Hemiptera (or true bugs), and various other insects. It usually can be seen to forage low to the ground, either by itself or in small groups. It is not usually found to forage above 20 m (66 ft), and very rarely above 30 m (98 ft). Black swifts flying below 20 m (66 ft) are frequently found near golden swallows when the swallows are foraging. It is known to forage in most habitats except the forest. Generally, the golden swallow starts to forage at dawn, with activity increasing in the morning and decreasing during the afternoon.

== Predators ==
The golden swallow is victim to various mammalian nest predators, including the introduced small Indian mongoose, feral cats, and multiple species of rats. These predators are thought to be linked to the extinction of the nominate subspecies in Jamaica. Nests on or near the ground in mines are especially vulnerable.

== Status ==
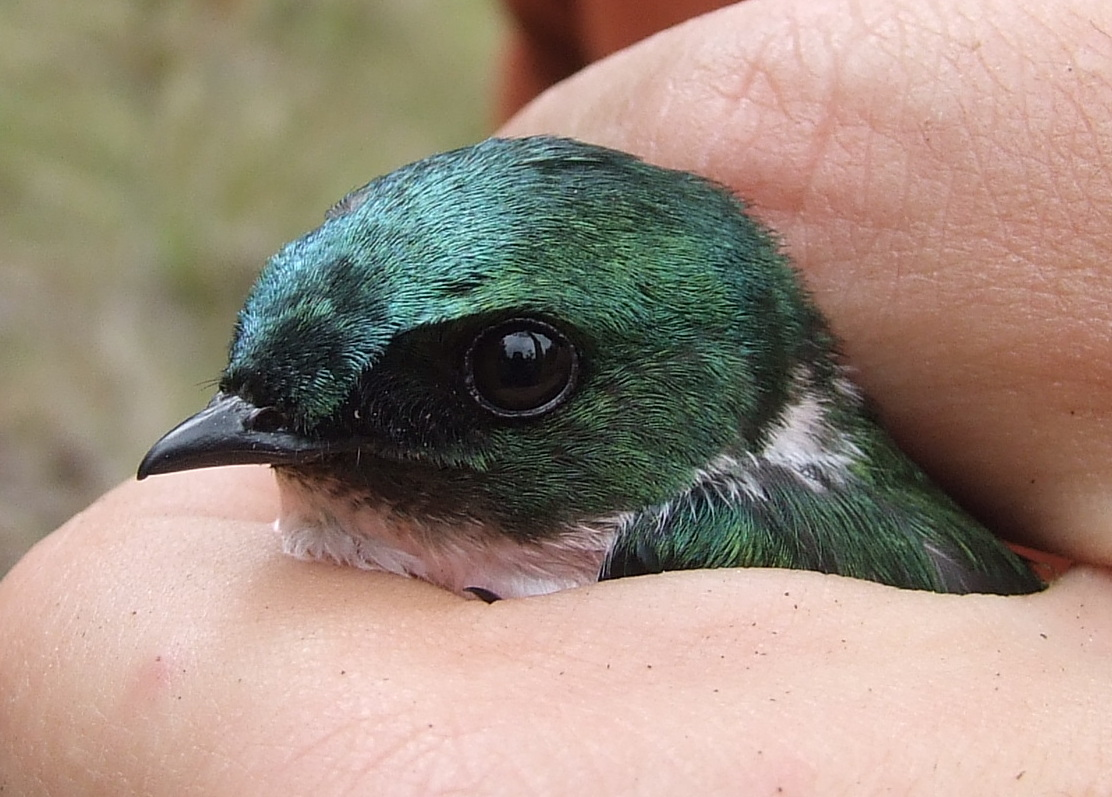
Adult female T. e. sclateri in hand

The golden swallow is considered to be a vulnerable species by the IUCN. This status is on account of the small, fragmented, and decreasing population and range. The nominate subspecies is extinct; predation appears to be a factor. The remaining T. e. sclateri population is declining, mostly due to shifting agriculture and predation by introduced mammalian species. The population is estimated to be anywhere from 1,500 to 7,000 mature birds, in an area estimated to be 8,100 km^{2} (3,100 mi^{2}).

This swallow is legally protected in Jamaica, although it is extinct there. Not known to the early settlers on the island, it was considered to be common in the 1800s, but it declined and eventually became rare in the 1890s. In the last half of the 1900s, it was restricted to the area of Cockpit Country east to the Blue Mountains. The last specimens collected were a pair from Portland Parish on 9 August 1908; the last confirmed sighting was in the Blue Mountains in 1950. It was regarded as rare from the 1960s to the 1980s, although its precarious status was not realised at the time. In 1987, the last major roosting site of this subspecies was destroyed. Birdwatchers in the Gosse Bird Club reported two probable sightings of several birds on Barbecue Bottom Road in Trelawny Parish in August and September 1982, while the last (and unconfirmed) report is of three birds at Hardwar Gap (located on the boundary between Saint Andrew and Portland parishes) on 8 June 1989.

Curator of Birds Gary R. Graves of the Smithsonian Institution spent 18 years scouring the island for evidence of the subspecies without success. He is doubtful of its survival, as it is diurnal, and Jamaica is a popular destination for birdwatchers. The exact cause of the extinction is unknown, but predation by introduced mammals, especially the black rat and the Indian mongoose, is thought to be a factor. Graves points out that there is little evidence habitat loss has played a role. Graves also added that the swallows adapted to nesting in man-made structures. In general, this swallow is not affected by being near human disturbance.

It is proposed that nest boxes be used to counter habitat loss and predation in Hispaniola.
