= Hardwar Gap =

- Interactive map of Hardwar Gap
- Elevation: 1,220 metres (4,000 ft)

Third Approach
- Location: Saint Andrew Parish and Portland Parish boundary
- Range: Blue Mountains
- Coordinates: 18.1481°N 76.7158°W

Hardwar Gap is a natural gap located in the Blue Mountains, on the border between Saint Andrew Parish and Portland Parish. It lies at an elevation of 1,220 metres (4,000 ft), and was named for Captain Hardwar, a British army captain who was supervising the construction of the road that cuts from this gap to Buff Bay.
