= DR-7 (Dominican Republic highway) =

Highway in the Dominican Republic

DR-7
- Carretera Juan Pablo II; Carretera del Nordeste; Carretera Santo Domingo-Samana

Route information
- Length: 66 mi (106 km)
- Existed: 2009–present

Major junctions
- Southern end: DR-3 at Santo Domingo Este, Santo Domingo Province, DR
- DR-3 and DR-4 in Santo Domingo Este; DR-5 in Sánchez
- Northern end: Cruce del Rincón, María Trinidad Sánchez Province

Location
- Country: Dominican Republic
- Major cities: Santo Domingo Este, Sánchez

Highway system
- Highways in the Dominican Republic

Map of DR-7, Autopista del Nordeste

The DR-7, also known as the Santo Domingo-Samana Highway or simply Samana Highway (In Spanish: Autopista del Noroeste), is the newest addition to the Dominican Republic national highway system, opening in 2008.

== Route description ==
The highway starts with the Autopista Las Américas DR-3 (30 km east of Santo Domingo) and ends at the intersection Cruce del Rincón, María Trinidad Sánchez province. There are three different toll booths along the route, in Marbella, Guaraguao and Naranjal.

== History ==
The actual construction of the rural highway started in the 2005 by the Secretary of Public Works and Communication (Secretaria de Publicas y Comunicación, SEOPC). In November 2007 the highway started final paving, since the landscape is difficult and the financing has been a major issue for the project and had stalled on several occasions thus delaying the project. It was finished by early February 2008. The new highway opened on 2008, and stretches 106 kilometers at a cost to the government of US$150 million.

It passes the city of Monte Plata, Bayaguana and the Los Haitises National Park and 12 bridges had to be built to cross difficult terrain and rivers. Each lane is 3.65 metres wide and there's a hard shoulder for emergency stops. The total width of the 2 lanes and the hard shoulder on each side is 8 meters.

The construction of this new rural highway was done through private financing which was initially to be paid with tolls from RD$350.00 up to RD$700.00 each way. In December 2021, president Luis Abinader announced the Dominican government would buy out the private consortium and manage the tolls directly via a government entity. As of January 2026, the tolls each way were RD$500 for the entire 106 kilometer (65 mile) route.

Even though this is much more expensive than most other highway tolls in the Dominican Republic, it is more economical compared to the old route because less time is spent and less fuel is needed. In addition, one can circumvent the very dangerous rural highway from the highway DR-1 near Bonao via San Francisco de Macoris to Samaná, which is one of the most deadly rural highways in the Dominican Republic.

The new two lane toll based highway was expected to convert Samaná to another thriving tourist hub and it makes the Los Haitises National Park much more accessible to the general public. The highway reduced the time a trip from Santo Domingo to the Samaná region took from 4 hours and 30 minutes to less than 2 hours. The highway is expected to reduce the traffic along the DR-1 which was the only highway connecting Santo Domingo to Samana.

== See also ==
- Highways and Routes in the Dominican Republic
