= DR-1 (Dominican Republic highway) =

Highway in the Dominican Republic

DR-1
- Expreso Quinto Centenario; Expreso John F Kennedy; Autopista Juan Pablo Duarte; Autopista Joaquín Balaguer

Route information
- Length: 167.77 mi (270.00 km)

Major junctions
- South end: DR-13, Maximo Gomez Avenue in Santo Domingo, DR
- DR-17 in Piedra Blanca; DR-12 near Bonao; DR-19 near La Vega; DR-21 near La Vega; DR-14 near Santiago de los Caballeros; DR-25 in Santiago de los Caballeros; DR-5 in Villa Bisonó
- North end: Monte Cristi, DR

Location
- Country: Dominican Republic
- Major cities: Santo Domingo, Bonao, La Vega, Santiago, Monte Cristi

Highway system
- Highways in the Dominican Republic

DR-1 is a dual carriageway highway that forms part of the five designated national highways of the Dominican Republic. DR-1 provides a fast connection between Santo Domingo, the capital, on the southern coast, and the second city Santiago and the rest of the northerly Cibao region, one of the country's main regions.

DR-1's southern terminus is the Expreso John F Kennedy in the City of Santo Domingo. The highway emerges from Greater Santo Domingo as Autopista Juan Pablo Duarte, and after reaching its midpoint, Santiago, it changes name to Autopista Joaquín Balaguer.

DR-1 is the oldest and one of the most efficient highways in the nation. Construction of the initial road from Santo Domingo to Santiago began in 1917 and was completed in 1922. Construction of the dual carriageway began during the period of Joaquín Balaguer and was finished under Leonel Fernández in 1997. Renovations and upgrades have continued ever since, with many future ones like the Viaduct from Los Alcarrizos to Distrito Nacional being in the construction stage.

== Route description ==
From its southern terminus in the Distrito Nacional (Santo Domingo) to its northern terminus in Monte Cristi on the Dominican-Haitian Border, the highway changes names and quality slightly deteriorates farther from Santo Domingo. DR-1 connects Santo Domingo to the Cibao region known for its fertile valley responsible of producing most of the country's agricultural exports. DR-1 also connects Santo Domingo with the Dominican Republic's second largest city, Santiago de los Caballeros.

=== Expreso John F. Kennedy ===
The Expreso John F Kennedy is an urban express corridor parallel to the Expreso 27 de Febrero crossing all of Downtown Santo Domingo and almost the whole Distrito Nacional. In this area, unlike its parallel Expreso, it is not composed of tunnels but instead only by long express viaducts and at ground a three-lane local service road. The beginning of this corridor is marked at the western end of the Avenida Quinto Centenario. This Expreso was finished in 1998–1999 to relieve intense congestion in the growing city of Santo Domingo. The Expreso intercepts the three main north–south avenues of the D.N, the Winston Churchill, Abraham Lincoln, and Maximo Gomez.

The Corridor does not cross the Ozama River, because it begins after that but is connected to Santo Domingo Este by the Avenue Quinto Centenario/San Vicente de Paul.

=== Autopista Juan Pablo Duarte ===
The highway exits Santo Domingo Oeste and is renamed to Autopista Juan Pablo Duarte in honor of the founding father. Autopista Duarte runs north north-west for much of its run towards the northwest corner of the Republic. On its run it connects Santo Domingo to the suburb Pedro Brand located about 20 kilometers away from the city-center and then goes northwest into the outskirts of Villa Altagracia. Continuing further north it makes a junction with DR-17 which connects it to the small towns of Maimon and Cotuí. To the north DR-1 bypasses the city of Bonao and intersects to DR-12 which serves as a direct connection to the fertile town of Constanza. Father northward almost reaching La Vega DR-1 intersects DR-19 which is the main roadway that leads to the major city of San Francisco de Macorís. DR-1 then proceeds to enter the outskirts of La Vega and connects to DR-21 which serves as a connection to the small town of Moca located slightly south-east of Santiago de los Caballeros. The highway then enters the city center of Santiago de los Caballeros where it currently ends.

=== Discontinuity in Santiago de los Caballeros and the Completion of Circunvalacion Norte ===
As DR-1 enters the city of Santiago de los Caballeros, it abruptly ends meters in front of the Monument to the Heroes of Restoration. Before, a highway gap between Autopista Juan Pablo Duarte and Joaquín Balaguer of about 5 kilometers in distance through the city of Santiago had existed and the only alternative to this problem was exiting on Salvador Estrella Sadhala avenue and continuing northwest in the avenue until reaching a junction with the continuation of DR-1 from this point onward renamed as Joaquin Balaguer. The government has fixed this issue in 2014 with the construction of the Circunvalacion Norte avenue and has been completed. The Circunvalacion Norte deviates traffic by going around the north side of Santiago with exits to Licey/Moca, Gurabo and exits to the northern part of Santiago until it merges with Joaquin Balaguer near Navarette.

=== Autopista Joaquín Balaguer ===
After the interruption In Santiago de los Caballeros, the highway is renamed again for a third time as Autopista Joaquín Balaguer in honor of the former Dominican president. After Santiago the highway follows the Yaque del Norte River northwest through the Cibao Valley. It runs 25 km to Villa Bisonó where it serves as an important junction to DR-5 which connects to the cities of Puerto Plata Province and the northern coast. The last part of this highway continues through the small towns of the Cibao Valley, the outskirts of Esperanza, Cruce de Guayacanes, Maizal, Villa Elisa and Villa Vasquez, until it reaches its westernmost point, the town of Monte Cristi on the coast. North of Santiago the quality of the highway and the organization deteriorates and is of lesser quality than other national highways. In this northwest extension highway exits are often little more than crossroads, for the most part improvised, and subject to frequent accidents. The highway ends in San Fernando de Monte Cristi close to the northern tip of the Dominican-Haitian Border. There it joins DR-45 which runs south to Dajabón with access to Ouanaminthe, Haiti.

== Major intersections ==
Cities	Major intersections	Distance from Santo Domingo
Santo Domingo	DR-4, DR-3	0 km, begins here
Villa Altagracia	--	42 km
Piedra Blanca	DR-Route 17	66 km
Bonao	--	85 km
Concepción de la Vega	DR-Route 21	125 km
Santiago de los Caballeros	DR-Route 25, DR-Route 14	155 km
Villa Bisonó	DR-5	180 km
San Fernando de Monte Cristi	DR-Route 45	270 km, ends here

=== See also ===
- Highways and Routes in the Dominican Republic
