= DR-13 (Dominican Republic highway) =

Highway in the Dominican Republic

DR-13
- Avenida Maximo Gomez; Avenida Hermanas Mirabal; Carretera de Yamasa

Major junctions
- South end: George Washington Avenue in Santo Domingo, DR
- DR-3 in Santo Domingo; DR 1 in Santo Domingo; DR-17 in Maimon
- North end: DR-17 in Maimon, DR

Location
- Country: Dominican Republic
- Major cities: Santo Domingo, Villa Mella, Yamasá, Maimon,

Highway system
- Highways in the Dominican Republic

DR-13 is a highway in the Dominican Republic. It connects Santo Domingo to the province of Monte Plata and Monseñor Nouel. Its two lanes run mostly through metropolitan Santo Domingo and it connects the Distrito Nacional with Santo Domingo Norte and Villa Mella. DR-13 is the only highway in Santo Domingo that crosses Greater Santo Domingo in its entirety. It runs from the coast up to Villa Mella where the highway is then referred to as Avenida Maximo Gomez while in SDN it is known as Avenida Hermanas Mirabal.

== Avenida Maximo Gomez ==
Avenida Maximo Gomez starts in the Malecon (Av. George Washington), Santo Domingo's coastal waterfront, and continues north intersecting Expreso 27 de Febrero and then Expreso John F Kennedy. These are the two most important transportation corridors of the city. It then exits central Santo Domingo and continues Northward across the Distrito Nacional until reaching the Ozama River.
