= Galactic ghoul =

Galactic Ghoul or galactic ghoul may refer to:

- DR 6 nebula, nicknamed "The Galactic Ghoul"
- Great Galactic Ghoul or "Galactic Ghoul", a fictional space monster on the planet Mars which allegedly consumes Mars probes
- "Galactic Ghoul", a character in the manga Empowered
