= DR6 =

DR6 may refer to:

- DR-6 (Dominican Republic highway)
- DR 6 (nebula), a star-forming region
- Baldwin DR-6, a locomotive
- Death receptor 6, a TNF receptor protein
- DR6 register, in the x86 architecture
- HLA-DR6, a serotype
