= Autopista 30 de Mayo =

Highway in the Dominican Republic

Autopista 30 de Mayo
- Avenida 30 de Mayo

Major junctions
- East end: Santo Domingo, DR
- DR-2
- West end: San Cristobal

Location
- Country: Dominican Republic
- Major cities: Santo Domingo, San Cristobal

Highway system
- Highways in the Dominican Republic

Autopista 30 de Mayo (lit. '30th of May Highway') is a highway in the Dominican Republic. The highway serves as a junction of the capital Santo Domingo, Dominican Republic and its adjacent city (part of the metropolitan area), San Cristóbal. It is a small highway, usually with heavy traffic, and passes through the Haina Port, the biggest port in the Dominican Republic. The eastern terminus is at the George Washington Avenue in the city coast and the western terminus lies at the city center of San Cristobal and then unites to the new section of DR-2 in the western part of San Cristobal.

== History ==
The highway is an old decommissioned part of national highway DR-2.

The highway is named 30 de Mayo due to the assassination of Dominican dictator Rafael Leonidas Trujillo Molina on May 30, 1961 on that highway.

== See also ==
- Highways and Routes in the Dominican Republic
