= Villa Elisa =

Villa Elisa may refer to:

- Villa Elisa, Entre Ríos, Argentina
- Villa Elisa, Buenos Aires, a district of the municipality of La Plata, Argentina
- Villa Elisa, Dominican Republic, a municipal district in the Monte Cristi province
- Villa Elisa, Paraguay, a city in the metropolitan area of Asunción
