= DR-12 (Dominican Republic highway) =

Highway in the Dominican Republic

DR-12
- Carretera de Constanza

Major junctions
- East end: DR-1, near Bonao, DR
- West end: Constanza, DR

Location
- Country: Dominican Republic
- Towns: Angostura, Tireo, Constanza

Highway system
- Highways in the Dominican Republic

DR-12, better known as la Carretera de Constanza, is a signed highway in the Dominican Republic, part of the national highway system. DR-12 connects the main highway of the Republic, DR-1, with the middle sized town of Constanza. Recently renovated, DR-12 is the only connection to the fertile valley of Constanza, which is high in the Cordillera Central. It was recently renovated in 2010. It is widely known for the natural beauty that surrounds it and also for the dangers of driving on it.
