= DR-4 (Dominican Republic highway) =

Highway in the Dominican Republic

DR-4
- Carretera Mella
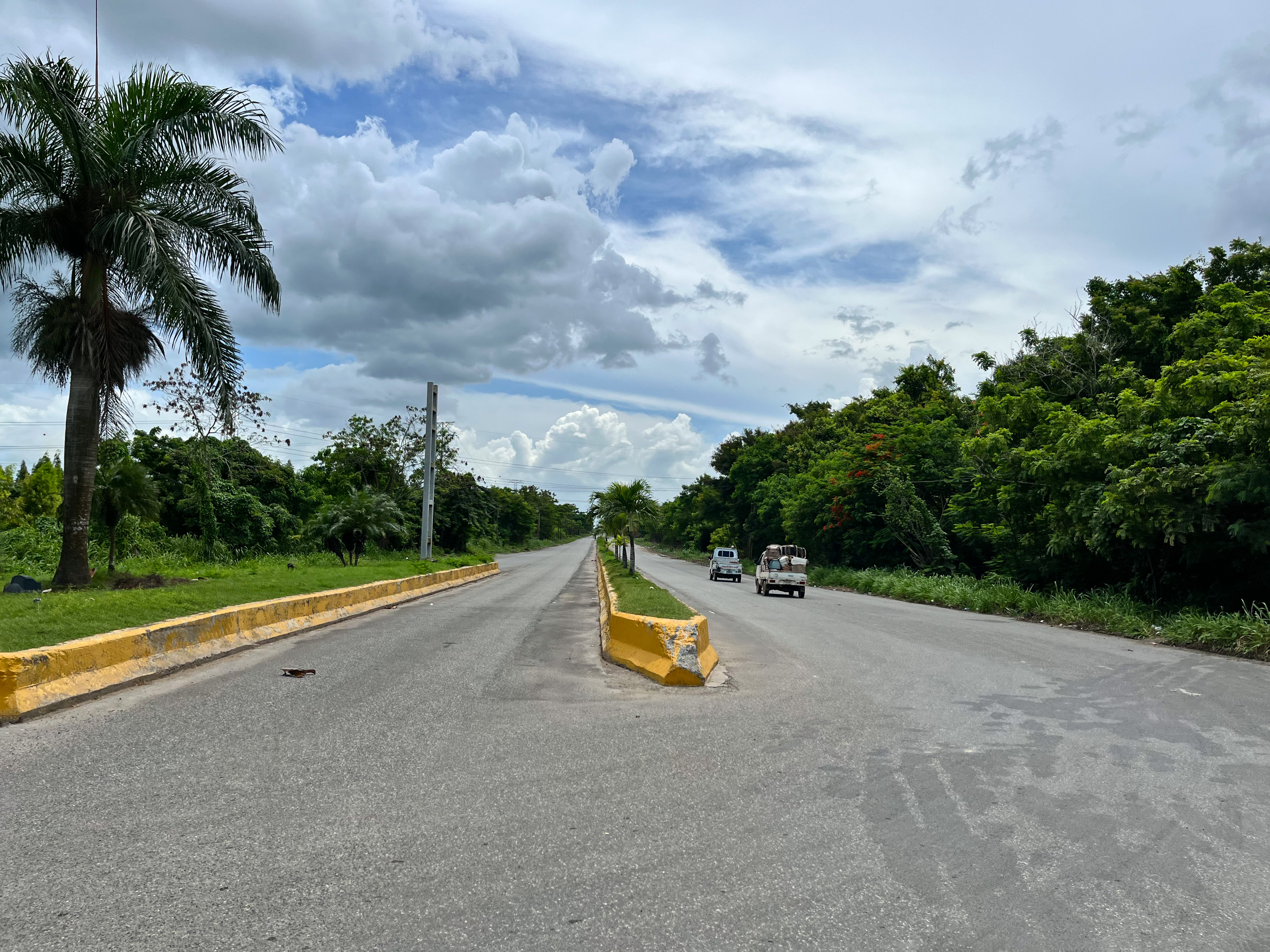

Major junctions
- West end: Santo Domingo, DR
- East end: San Rafael del Yuma, DR

Location
- Country: Dominican Republic
- Major cities: Santo Domingo, Boca Chica, San Pedro de Macorís, Hato Mayor del Rey, El Seibo, Higuey, San Rafael del Yuma

Highway system
- Highways in the Dominican Republic

DR-4 is the fourth numbered highway of the Dominican Republic. It starts from Santo Domingo eastwards to San Pedro de Macorís and then to the north to Hato Mayor del Rey and again eastwards ending in the San Rafael del Yuma (or Boca de Yuma).

Cities	Major intersections	Distance from Santo Domingo
Santo Domingo	DR-3, DR-11,	0 km, begins here or Santo Domingo Este*
San Pedro de Macorís		70 km
Hato Mayor del Rey		97 km
Santa Cruz del Seibo		135 km
Salvaleón de Higüey	DR-5	145 km
San Rafael del Yuma	DR-3	120 km, ends here*

^{*Notes: Where the highway begins is disputed, some say Santo Domingo others Santo Domingo Este. There is unclear information given by SEOPC about where the highway ends.}

== See also ==
- Highways and routes in the Dominican Republic
