= Bisonó =

Navarrete
- City
- Navarrete in the Dominican Republic
- Coordinates: 19°33′36″N 70°52′12″W
- Country: Dominican Republic
- Province: Santiago
- Found: 1939
- Municipality since: 1961

Area
  - Total: 92.63 km^{2} (35.76 sq mi)
- Elevation: 50 m (160 ft)

Population (2012)
  - Total: 140,666
  - Density: 1,519/km^{2} (3,933/sq mi)
- Municipal Districts: 0

Navarrete (Municipio de villa Bisonó) is a municipality in northwestern Dominican Republic, created in 1961. It lies approximately 25 kilometres (16 mi) from Santiago de los Caballeros, Dominican Republic's second largest city. The administrative centre is in the town of Villa Bisonó.

== Geography ==
Bisonó is located in the Cibao Valley of the Yaque del Norte River. Before the clearance for agriculture and grazing, the area was forested, being in a subtropical dry forest ecosystem. The northern part of the municipality grades into the foothills of the Cordillera Septentrional.

The southern boundary of Bisonó municipality is formed by the Yaque del Norte River. Across the river to the south is the municipal district of La Canela, to the southwest and west is the province of Valverde, to the north is the municipality of Altamira of Puerto Plata Province, to the southeast is the municipality of Villa Gonzalez and to the northeast is the municipal district of El Limon.

=== Settlements ===
The major town is Villa Bisonó, often known as Navarrete. It was formally recognized in 1956 and named after a local land owner José Elías Bisonó. The town is at the junction of highways DR-1 and DR-5. The town has several neighborhoods (barrios), including Barrio 27 de Febrero, Barrio Los Candelones, Bario Duarte, Bario La Mella, Barrio Nuevo (Jeremias), Barrio Rotonda, Barrio San Miguel, Barrio Trinitaria, and Jalisco.

Other settlements include Las Atravesadas, Cañada Bonita, Ponton, Pontoncito, El Estacion and Villanueva.

== History ==
In 1939 the area, known as Navarrete, was placed under the rural administration of the municipality of Santiago. In 1956 the settlement of Villa Bisonó, Navarrete, was recognized. In the late 1950s the area was upgraded to a municipal district under the name Navarrete, but still within the Santiago municipality. In 1962 the area was elevated to the category of municipality within the province of Santiago, with the name "Bisonó", although often referred to as "Villa Bisonó" or "Navarrete".

== Government ==
Outside Villa Bisonó the municipality is divided into seven rural sectors with forty-seven designated locations. The seven sectors are: Cañada Bonita, Mejía de Navarrete, Villa Heneken or Pontoncito, Villanueva, Estancia del Yaque, La Lomota, and Vuelta Larga.

Since 2002, Amantina Gómez, of the Partido de la Liberación Dominicana (PLD), as well as Tito bueno from the partido revolucionario moderno (PRM) has been in charge of the municipal government.
