= Cana Chapetón =

- Location within the Dominican Republic
- Coordinates: 19°36′0″N 71°16′12″W
- Country: Dominican Republic
- Province: Monte Cristi

Population (2008)
  - Total: 1 877

Cana Chapetón is a town in the Monte Cristi province of the Dominican Republic.

== Sources ==
- World Gazeteer: Dominican Republic – World-Gazetteer.com
