= DR-6 (Dominican Republic highway) =

Highway in the Dominican Republic

DR-6
- Autopista 6 de Noviembre

Major junctions
- East end: Plaza la Bandera, Santo Domingo, DR
- DR-2 near San Cristóbal
- West end: DR-2, San Cristóbal, DR

Location
- Country: Dominican Republic
- Major cities: Santo Domingo, San Cristóbal, Baní ^{merges with DR-2 between San Cristobal and Bani}

Highway system
- Highways in the Dominican Republic

DR-6 is a designated highway in the Dominican Republic and gives Santo Domingo a fast connection to the southwestern part of the republic bypassing the city of Bajos de Haina, and San Cristobal. Unlike DR-2 which takes a local route through the center of Haina and San Cristobal, DR-6 bypasses the towns slightly to the north making it easier and faster for travelers to reach destinations farther west of San Cristobal. After bypassing San Cristobal it merges with DR-2 and ends. DR-2 continues to the western towns of the nation.

== Overview ==
As most highways in the Dominican Republic were completed with the intentions to connect interior cities with the capital they were designed to be the main artery of each town and to serve as a main street. This created a situation of slow driving and extensive traffic for those trying to reach cities farther west. Haina and San Cristóbal continued growing extensively and a solution for drivers trying to bypass these cities was needed. To solve the traffic problem it was decided that a whole new highway was necessary to replace DR-2 for trips to the west. President Joaquin Balaguer completed the construction in the 90s, of such a highway 2-4 kilometers north of DR-2.

=== Autopista 6 de Noviembre ===
The Highway starts 200 meters Northwest of Plaza De La Bandera in Santo Domingo, Distrito Nacional. From there it continues WSW to San Cristobal and passes through the Neighborhoods of Upper Haina, Madre Vieja, and connects to the Famous "La Toma". After passing through the outer San Cristobal it unites with DR-2. This road was built as an expressway to connect the city of Santo Domingo to San Cristobal, in order to avoid the high traffic coming from DR-2 and the port of Haina. It has three lanes each way, and avoids entering the city of San Cristobal, merging with Carretera Sánchez in its outskirts.

=== Dangerousness ===
The highway it is one of the busiest highways in the Dominican Republic, mainly because it is a fast road around San Cristóbal, but also because of its danger, surrounded by unsafe returns, to direct local sites and towns.

== See also ==
- Highways and Routes in the Dominican Republic
