= Monte Cristi Province =

Province of the Dominican Republic

Monte Cristi
- Province
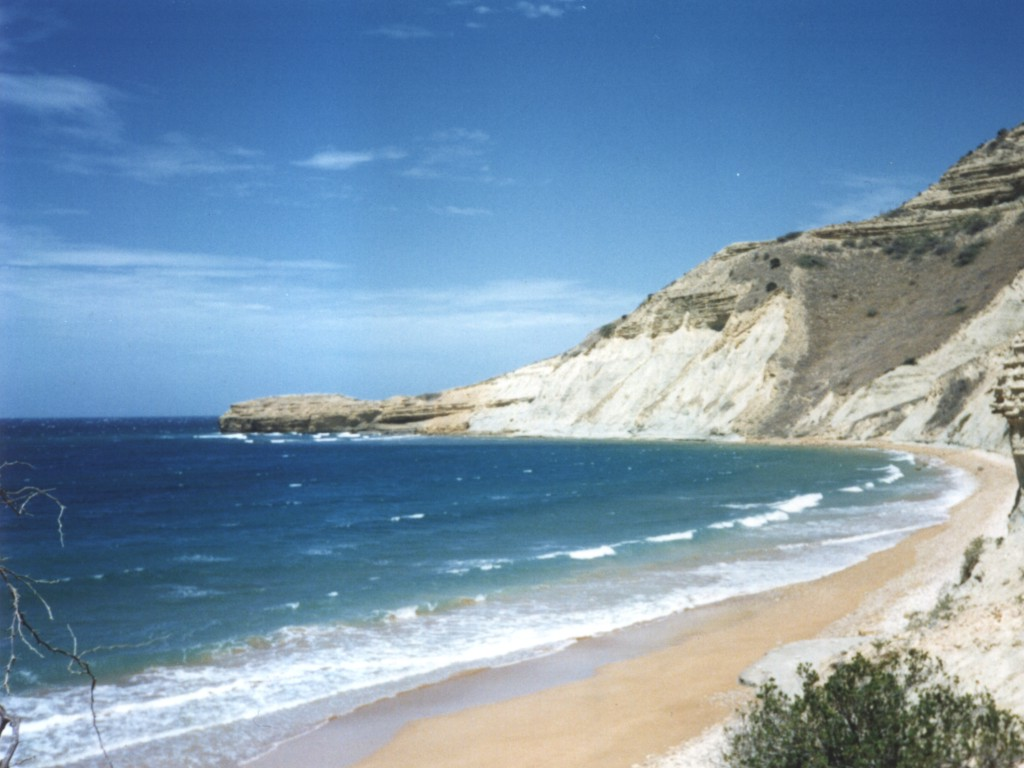
- Coastline of Monte Cristi

- Location of the Monte Cristi Province
- Country: Dominican Republic
- Region: Cibao
- Province since: 1879
- Capital: San Fernando de Monte Cristi

Government
  - Type: Subdivisions
  - Body: 6 municipalities 4 municipal districts
  - Congresspersons: 1 Senator; 2 Deputies

Area
  - Total: 1,924.35 km^{2} (743.00 sq mi)

Population (2014)
  - Total: 150,833
  - Density: 78.3813/km^{2} (203.007/sq mi)
- Time zone: UTC-4 (EST)
- Area code: 1-809 1-829 1-849
- ISO 3166-2: DO-15
- Postal Code: 62000

Monte Cristi (Spanish pronunciation: [ˈmonte ˈkɾisti]), also spelled Montecristi is a province in the northwest of the Dominican Republic. The capital city is San Fernando de Monte Cristi (usually simply Monte Cristi). The province is located in the Cibao frontier region, on the north coast of the country and borders the nation of Haiti. The land area of the province is 1,924.35 km^{2} (743 mi^{2}). It is divided into six municipalities and four municipal districts.

Monte Cristi is where the Duarte Highway ends, which runs through the country from South to North from the city of Santo Domingo. Additionally, the province has a network of secondary roads that interconnect the city of San Fernando de Montecristi with the other municipalities and surrounding provinces.

== History ==
Monte Cristi was founded by Nicolás de Ovando in 1506 and populated in 1533 by Juan de Bolaños and 63 families from the Canary Islands. These migrated to various parts of the country afterwards leaving the town behind. It was later repopulated and became a wealthy port in the mid-to-late 16th century.

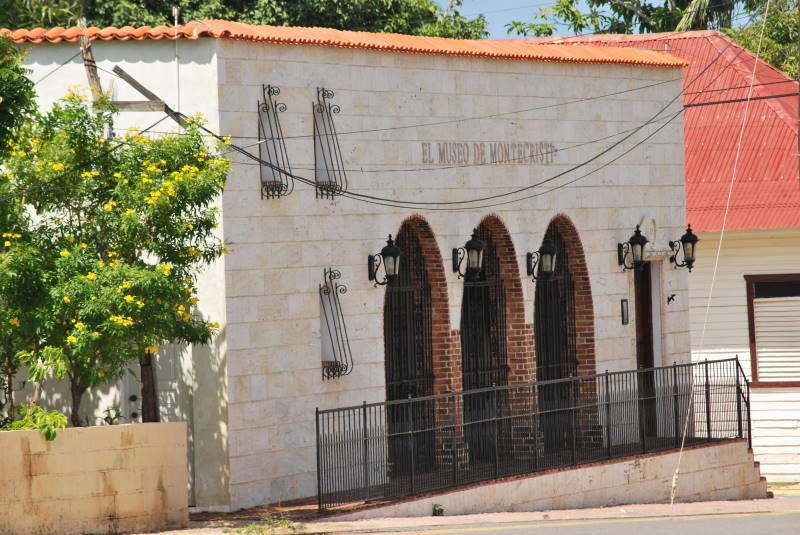
Montecristi town museum

During the 1600s the coast of Montecristi was a hotbed of pirate activity in the West Indies. In 1756 the city became a prosperous trading center, until the early 20th century. Monte Cristi had a boom period in the last quarter of the 1800s.

The town was at the forefront in many of the advances including the first aqueduct, first railroad and telephone. The great task of diverting the course of the Yaque del Norte River was undertaken, which had lost its initial course when the cataclysm of 1802. The town attracted people not only from Santo Domingo, Santiago, Puerto Plata and other communities, but also foreigners (English, French, Spanish, Chinese, Americans, South Americans and islanders from the other Antilles).

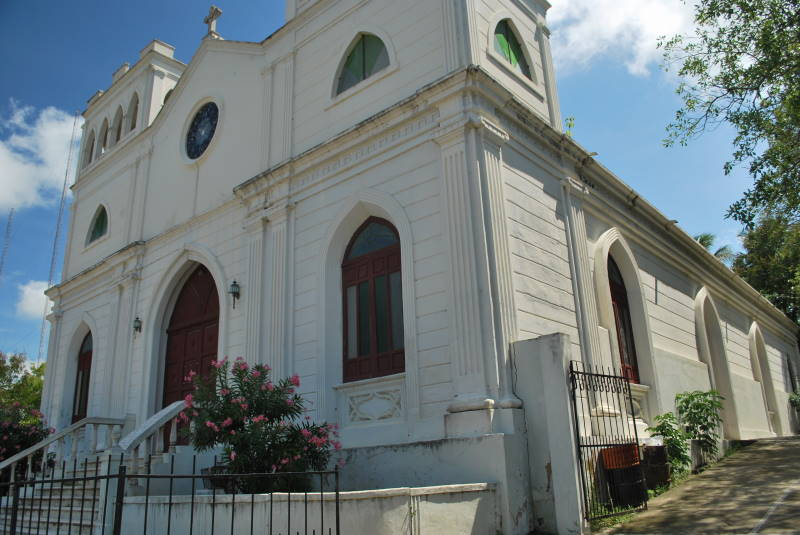
Church of Montecristi, Dominican Republic

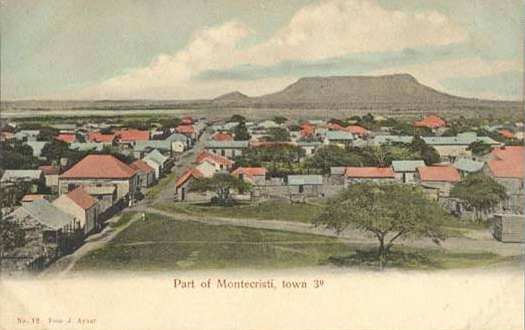
Montecristi in 1906

In 1895, it was the site of the signing of the Manifesto of Montecristi by Máximo Gómez and José Martí, at the Gómez home on Mella St. They sailed from "La Granja" beach, also in Montecristi, to Cuba to fight for its independence.

The economic decline of Monte Cristi began with the decrease in the demand for raw materials in Europe, difficulties of the Casa Jiménez, which the dictator Ulises Heureaux forced to escape from the hands of his political rival, Juan Isidro Jiménez, and then the problems derived from World War I.

On 8 April 2025, the governor of the province, Nelsy Cruz, died when a roof collapsed at a Santo Domingo nightclub.

== Geography ==
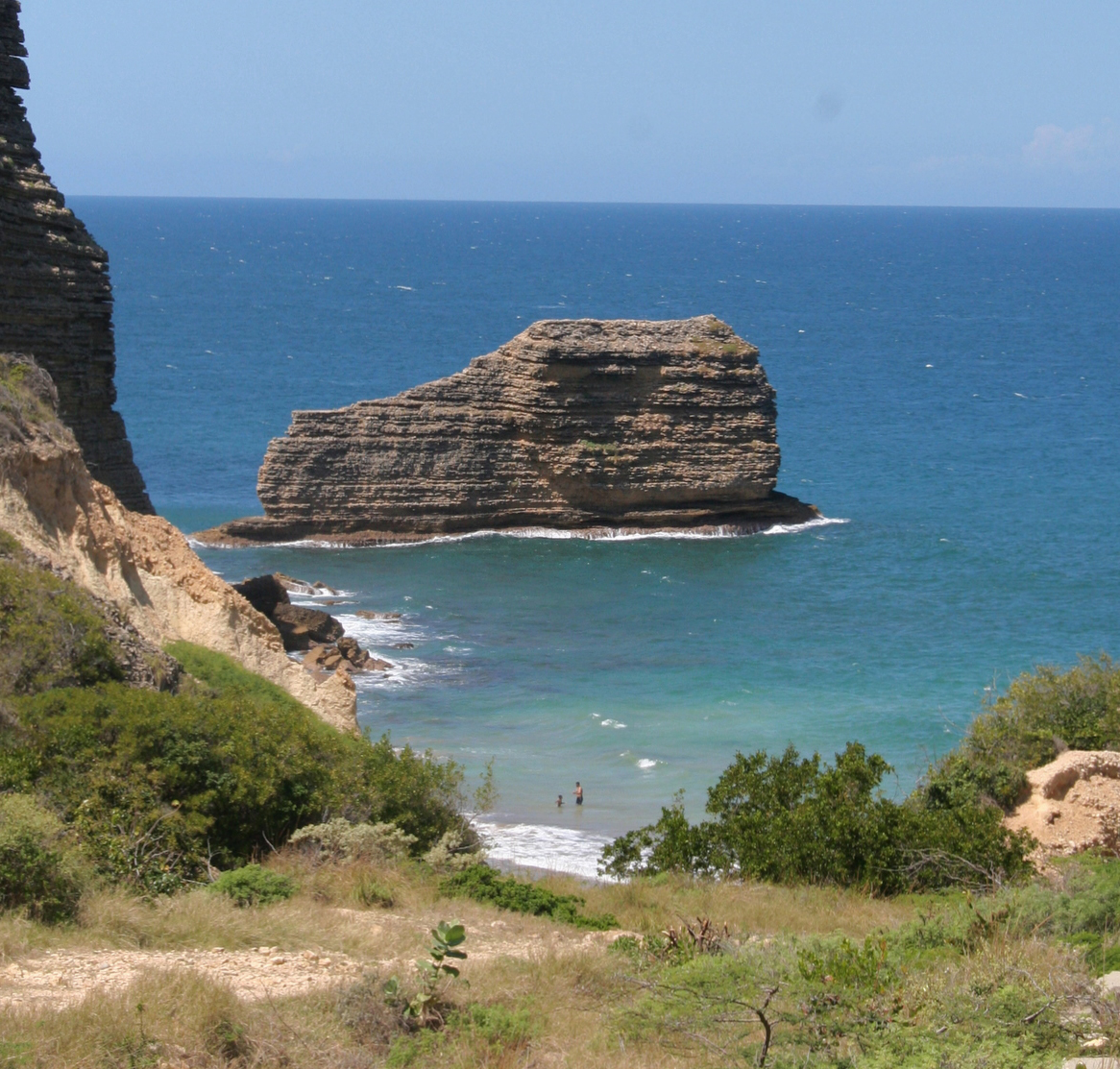
Morro de Montecristi

The Montecristi province limits to the North with the Atlantic Ocean: to the South with the provinces Dajabón and Santiago Rodríguez; to the East with the Valverde province and to the West with the Atlantic Ocean and the Republic of Haiti. The Montecristi province is fundamentally an immense plain with many hills. El Morro, with an approximate height of 237 meters, is one of the characteristic symbols of Montecristeno relief. It is a solitary elevation, in the form of a plateau.

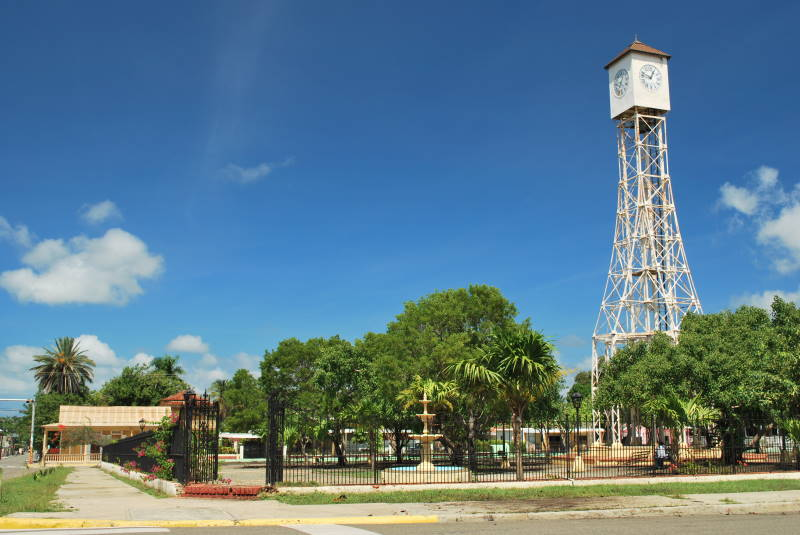
Clock-tower of Montecristi

The Yaque del Norte River, the largest in the country, empties into the Montecristi Bay after making a long journey of 296 kilometers from the rugged Central Mountain Range. Three important rivers in the province join the Yaque del Norte: the Maguaca, the Guayubín, and the Indio. The Chacuey River and its tributary, the Macabón, are also part of the provincial basins, which complete numerous streams. The Montecristi province belongs to the Irrigation District called Bajo Yaque del Norte, with two different irrigation zones in it: Villa Vásquez and Las Matas de Santa Cruz. The first covers an area of approximately 179,733 tasks, and the second covers 320,672 tasks.

The Montecristi province has one of the most diverse and numerous systems of protected areas in the country, six in total, which include national parks, underwater national parks, wildlife refuges and scientific reserves.

== Economy ==
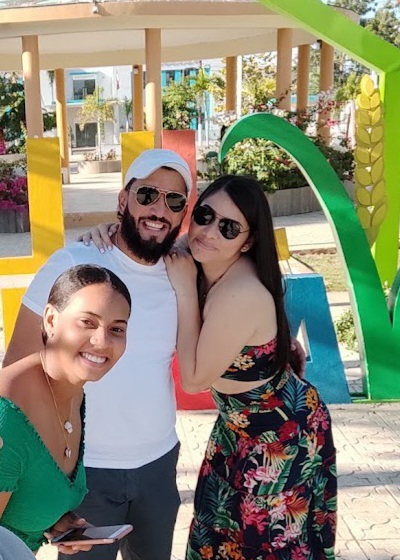
People in town of Villa Vasquez, Monte Cristi, Dominican Republic

The main activity of the province is agriculture, with important production of fruits and vegetables; in addition, the production of goats, sheep and cattle is important. On the coast, fishing and salt production are important.

Tourism development is currently concentrated in the city of Montecristi although there is potential along the entire coast, both western (Pepillo Salcedo) and north. Notable points are the Morro plateau and the Cayos Siete Hermanos.

== Municipalities and municipal districts ==
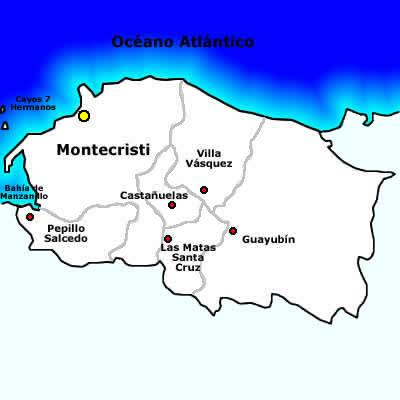
Municipalities of Monte Cristi Province

The province as of June 20, 2006 is divided into the following municipalities (municipios) and municipal districts (distrito municipal, D.M.) in them:

- Castañuelas
  - Palo Verde (D.M.)
- Guayubín
  - Cana Chapetón (D.M.)
  - Hatillo Palma (D.M.)
  - Villa Elisa (D.M.)
- Las Matas de Santa Cruz
- Pepillo Salcedo
- San Fernando de Monte Cristi
- Villa Vásquez

The following is a sortable table of the municipalities and municipal districts with population figures as of the 2012 census. Urban population are those living in the seats (cabeceras literally heads) of municipalities or of municipal districts. Rural population are those living in the districts (secciones: sections) and neighborhoods (parajes: stops) outside of them.

| Name | Total population | Urban population | Rural population |
|---|---|---|---|
| Castañuelas | 14,878 | 4,005 | 10,873 |
| Guayubín | 32,586 | 5,899 | 26,687 |
| Las Matas de Santa Cruz | 18,756 | 9,515 | 9,241 |
| Pepillo Salcedo | 11,588 | 4,983 | 6,605 |
| San Fernando de Monte Cristi | 42,657 | 26,868 | 15,789 |
| Villa Vásquez | 15,245 | 12,191 | 3,054 |
| Monte Cristi province | 135,710 | 63,461 | 72,249 |

For comparison with the municipalities and municipal districts of other provinces see the list of municipalities and municipal districts of the Dominican Republic.

== Notable people ==
- Juan Marichal, Hall of fame pitcher for the San Francisco Giants.
- Tony Peña, Former professional baseball player, manager and coach.
- Ozzie Virgil, Sr., The first Dominican to play in Major League Baseball
