= Castañuelas =

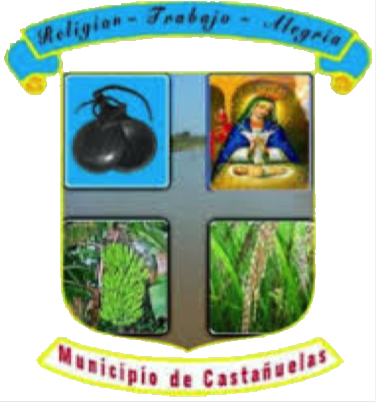
- Coat of arms

- Location within the Dominican Republic
- Coordinates: 19°42′0″N 71°30′0″W
- Country: Dominican Republic
- Province: Monte Cristi
- Municipality since: 1974

Area
  - Total: 80.90 km^{2} (31.24 sq mi)

Population (2012)
  - Total: 14,878
  - Density: 183.9/km^{2} (476.3/sq mi)
  - Urban: 4,005
- Municipal Districts: 1

Castañuelas is a town and municipality located in Monte Cristi Province, Dominican Republic. Its total population is 14,878 with the urban population at 4,005.
