= Hatillo Palma =

- Location within the Dominican Republic
- Coordinates: 19°40′12″N 71°10′48″W
- Country: Dominican Republic
- Province: Monte Cristi

Population (2008)
  - Total: 3 814

Hatillo Palma is a town in the Monte Cristi province of the Dominican Republic.
