= Cruce de Ocoa =

Coordinates: 18.35314°N 70.46858°W

Cruce De Ocoa is an important junction and a small town in the Dominican Republic. Less than a thousand inhabitants live in the town. A major highway, DR-2, passes through and intersects with DR-Route 42 at Cruce De Ocoa. DR-Route 42 connects DR-2 to San José de Ocoa, capital city of the province with the same name.
