= DR-5 (Dominican Republic highway) =

Highway in the Dominican Republic

DR-5
- Carretera Navarrete-Puerto Plata-Sanchez

Major junctions
- South end: Navarrete
- North end: Las Galeras

Location
- Country: Dominican Republic
- Major cities: Villa Bisonó, Imbert, Puerto Plata, Sosúa, Nagua, Sanchez, Las Galeras

Highway system
- Highways in the Dominican Republic

DR-5 is of one of the main highways in the Dominican Republic. The highway begins at a T-interchange with DR-1 in Villa Bisonó in the small town of Navarrete located about 20 kilometers northwest of Santiago de los Caballeros. Its endpoint is the municipal district Las Galeras. Initially DR-5 starts north of Santiago with a junction with DR-1. DR-1 continues northwest to Monte Cristi while DR-5 turns northeast to the Cities of Puerto Plata, Sosua, and its ending point at the Samana Province.

== See also ==
- Highways and routes in the Dominican Republic
