= Villa Vásquez =

- Location within the Dominican Republic
- Coordinates: 19°44′24″N 71°27′0″W
- Country: Dominican Republic
- Province: Monte Cristi

Area
  - Total: 229.86 km^{2} (88.75 sq mi)

Population (2012)
  - Total: 15,245
  - Density: 66.323/km^{2} (171.78/sq mi)
- Municipal Districts: 0

Villa Vásquez is a town in the Monte Cristi province of the Dominican Republic.

== Population ==
According to the 'Census of 2002': the town has a population of 20,784 people, with a density of 64.3 inhabitants/km^{2}

The Municipality of 'Villa Vasquez', in the Dominican historical events and always for political reasons, has changed its name many times. It is one of the most dynamic economic area, the product of its large farming and ranching.

== History ==
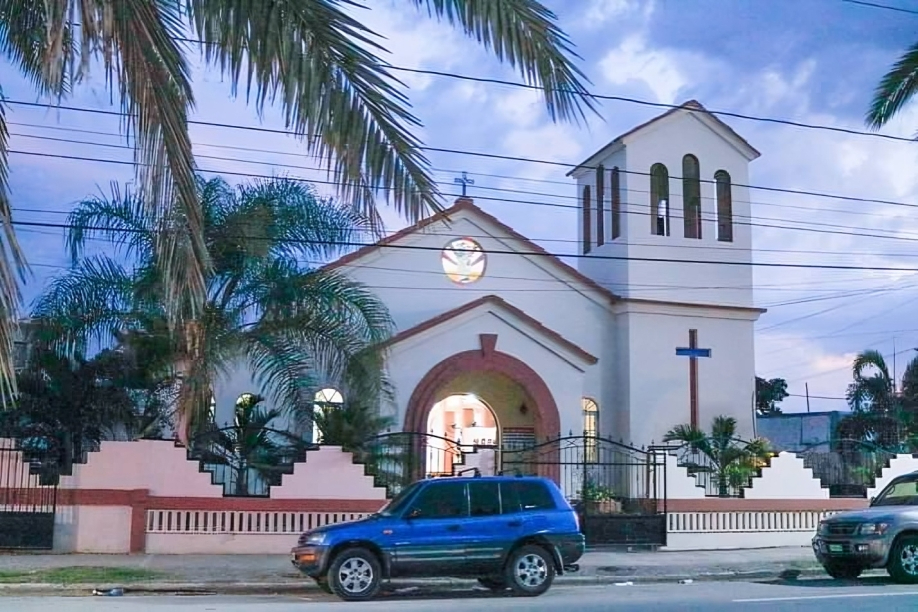
Villa Vasquez, Dominican Republic church

Formerly known as Santa Ana (for many Santana), but after years of hegemony of Horacio Vásquez, Villa Vásquez was named in his honour. No.1055 Law of December 14, 1935 changed its name to Demetrio Rodriguez to honor Juan Gomez.

Two years later the law No.1385 of September 17, 1937 changed the designation by Villa Isabel, one of the major landowners in the area and at that time, confidant of the dictator Trujillo.

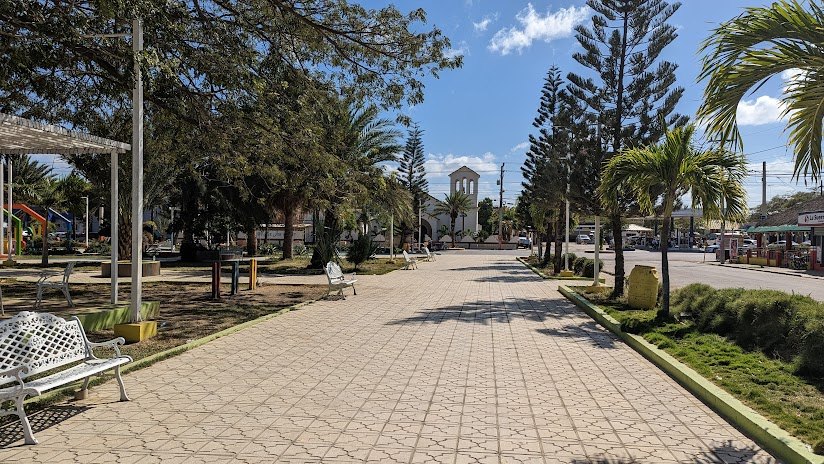
Villa Vasquez, Dominican Republic park

On June 20, 1938 by Law No.1521, Villa Isabel became Municipality of Montecristi. For the year 1960 was designated Peña Villa Lucas Evangelista and 1962 turned to be called Villa Vasquez as hitherto known . village vasquez was formed in January 1939.el villa vasquez trustee was Erique Vasquez montecristeno. decree vasquez village was constituted by teal. happens in the year 1944 the insendio of Villa Vasquez.

From 1929 to 1932, the Finnish Utopian community of Viljavakka was located here. At its peak the community had 140 inhabitants mostly from Vyborg and Vaasa. The community was intended to grow rice but very few colonists had farming background and growing rice in the Caribbean was difficult. By 1932, most were either returning home with money borrowed from family or moving to other parts of the Dominican Republic.

== Geography ==
The municipality of Villa Vasquez has a land area of 222.88 square kilometers. Divided into three sections and 17 townships.

== Climate ==
Climate data for Villa Vásquez (1961–1990)
Month	Jan	Feb	Mar	Apr	May	Jun	Jul	Aug	Sep	Oct	Nov	Dec	Year
Record high °C (°F)	37.5 (99.5)	39.5 (103.1)	39.1 (102.4)	40.6 (105.1)	39.9 (103.8)	40.0 (104.0)	40.0 (104.0)	39.2 (102.6)	40.6 (105.1)	40.3 (104.5)	38.5 (101.3)	38.0 (100.4)	40.6 (105.1)
Mean daily maximum °C (°F)	30.7 (87.3)	31.5 (88.7)	32.5 (90.5)	32.6 (90.7)	33.7 (92.7)	34.7 (94.5)	35.1 (95.2)	35.2 (95.4)	35.0 (95.0)	34.2 (93.6)	31.9 (89.4)	30.6 (87.1)	33.1 (91.6)
Mean daily minimum °C (°F)	19.3 (66.7)	19.6 (67.3)	20.1 (68.2)	20.6 (69.1)	21.6 (70.9)	22.5 (72.5)	22.7 (72.9)	22.9 (73.2)	22.4 (72.3)	21.9 (71.4)	20.5 (68.9)	19.2 (66.6)	21.1 (70.0)
Record low °C (°F)	11.0 (51.8)	13.3 (55.9)	14.0 (57.2)	13.5 (56.3)	15.5 (59.9)	16.8 (62.2)	17.0 (62.6)	17.0 (62.6)	18.0 (64.4)	18.0 (64.4)	10.0 (50.0)	13.9 (57.0)	10.0 (50.0)
Average rainfall mm (inches)	45.2 (1.78)	36.9 (1.45)	39.2 (1.54)	49.1 (1.93)	81.2 (3.20)	67.3 (2.65)	41.2 (1.62)	48.8 (1.92)	54.9 (2.16)	71.0 (2.80)	90.3 (3.56)	62.2 (2.45)	687.3 (27.06)
Average rainy days (≥ 1.0 mm)	3.7	3.2	2.7	3.8	6.2	6.1	4.2	4.7	4.8	5.7	5.7	4.8	55.6
Source: NOAA

== Education ==
The number of schools registered for that date was 23 with 85 classrooms, including unical level, primary and secondary.

Two health centers with 9 doctors and 14 nurses.

For the year 1993 there were 6413 people registered as voters.

also has three polyclinics in various neighborhoods, such as the polyclinic hope, medical clinic and polyclinic colony of south

== Economy ==
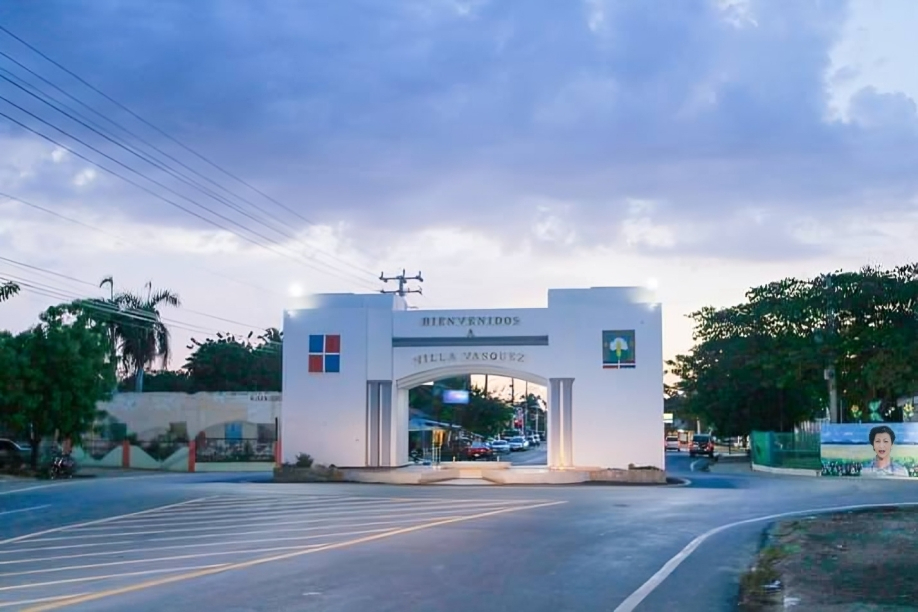
Villa Vasquez, Dominican Republic people

The agricultural area of 60,200 domestic tasks, with 449 rural settlements. The main crop is rice, but also has large tracts of land devoted to various crops such as onions, peppers, cassava and especially to cattle sheep and goats.

Villa Vásquez also has two cemeteries, a police of the 35 companies, one guzgado, a municipal hospital, a fire department, a Catholic church, and a meetinghouse for the Church of Jesus Christ of Latter-day Saints (LDS Church).
