= List of Empowered characters =

This is a list of Empowered characters.

== Main characters ==
=== Empowered ===
Empowered (Elissa Megan Powers), nicknamed Emp, is a member of the Superhomeys superhero group and the titular character of the Empowered graphic novel series. Her powers are derived from a super suit of unknown origin and nature that fell out of the sky in an envelope addressed to her, which gives her superhuman strength, durability, invisibility, X-ray vision, the ability to cling to surfaces, high-intensity energy discharges, flight, and the ability to survive in space. This suit, while being Emp's source of power, has also made her a social laughingstock as it often fails her when she needs it the most. Despite these shortcomings, Empowered's super suit has steadily become more useful and resilient with new abilities being revealed as the series progresses. Additionally, Emp's suit has been implied to have been bonded specifically to her, and has been shown to be completely useless when worn by other people. The suit's odd behaviour and contradictory properties (such as being able to stop bullets and shark bites, yet also extremely fragile) are at least partially a result of Emp's psychological difficulties and limitations.

Because Empowered is only an associate member of the Superhomeys, her participation with the group is limited in scope and something akin to "part-time", so she still has a day job. Her first day job consisted of wearing a mascot costume for the discount retail store Value Mammoth, advertising the store's sales with a picket sign. This job earned her much disrespect and derision from passersby. Eventually, Emp lost this job when she accidentally destroyed the store in an attempt to defeat a mollusc-like monster. Afterward, Emp moved on to cosplaying as her costumed self in a licensed troupe of Superhomeys imitators known as "The Superhomeys Experience". In this guise, she wears a PVC imitation of her supersuit. During her performances, she affects a comically heavy Southern accent to protect her identity.

=== Thugboy ===
Thugboy, real name Noah, is a former-career criminal and boyfriend of Emp. Although Thugboy had previously been a career criminal, he quickly gave up his life of crime to become somewhat of a protector and primary supporter of Emp in her efforts to become a worthwhile superhero. Before meeting Emp, Thugboy was the nominal leader of the Witless Minions, a gang of comrades that made a living through being hired by aspiring supervillains for the eventual purpose of bankrupting them by stealing their equipment and selling it for personal profit. He also briefly worked for a white supremacist supervillain named "Super Caucasian", but was swiftly fired for being half-Japanese. Eventually, this scheme went awry when they became employed by Willy Pete. Rather than driving Willy Pete into bankruptcy and forcing him to give up his schemes due to a lack of funding and support, it incensed Willy Pete so much that he decided to track down and kill every last member of the Witless Minions. In this, Willy Pete was nearly successful; after having sodomized every other Witless Minion, Willy Pete was temporarily incapacitated by being frozen. This afforded Thugboy the necessary time to escape. Since the demise of the Witless Minions, and until he first met Emp, Thugboy lived his life with no regard for his own well being, often showing no fear in the face of imminent danger or death.

=== Kozue Kaburagi, aka Ninjette ===
Kozue Kaburagi, more commonly referred to as Ninjette or simply Jette, is a highly skilled ninja and princess of the Kaburagi ninja clan, based out of New Jersey. Although Ninjette is either a second or third-generation Japanese-American with a strongly Caucasoid appearance, her family name is intended to be traditionally Japanese. Despite being a princess of the Kaburagi ninja clan, Ninjette ran away from her clan and has been in hiding for several years so as to avoid being forced into a life of servitude to the clan by continually giving birth to high-blooded clan members. She met Emp in the usual way - i.e., Emp getting captured once again -, but when her thugs failed to show up to collect her captive, the two women went into the next bar for a drinking rout and became fast friends. Kozue subsequently moved in with Emp and Thugboy and has been a close friend to both ever since.

== Heroes ==
=== Dr. Big McLarge Huge ===
Dr. Big McLarge Huge is a doctor at the Purple Paladin Memorial hospital who is named for his massive stature. While Huge appears to be a dedicated physician, he is still upset that he has never been nominated for a Caped Justice award, and deems such injustice as a misplacement of priorities within the superhero community. While attending the Caped Justice Awards, Huge ingests some of the food that had been tainted with Wet Blanket's flesh and reverts to a smaller form, indicating that his size is not a natural attribute.

=== Capitan Rivet ===
Capitan Rivet is the nominal leader of the Superhomeys. Rivet's attributes are largely unknown aside from some visual clues given in the various battles that the character has participated in. In several instances, Capitan Rivet appears to be a hollow suit of armor, having taken fatal injuries without injury.

=== Captain Katana ===
Captain Katana is a hero whose limbs have been severed at the knees and elbows and replaced with Katanas on mechanical joints. Additionally, he has a magical Katana running through the top of his head. Katana was killed in his participation in an attempt to ambush and defeat Willy Pete.

=== Divangelic ===
Divangelic is a pair of female entities; a demon named Vanity and an angel named Charity of nearly identical appearance who are conjoined at the shoulder. They are members of the Superhomeys. Divangelic, in following their biblical theme, is capable of flight through use of one feathery stereotypically angelic wing and one bat-like demon wing. The two entities of Divangelic also wield weapons individually; Vanity, a bullwhip with a sort of energy cracker, and Charity with a type of smooth headed Morning Star with glowing energy ports instead of spikes. Divangelic was killed in the ambush on Willy Pete.

=== dWARf! ===
dWARf! is a senior member of the Superhomeys who possesses superhuman strength. He was previously known as Fleshmaster and had low-level gene-altering abilities. His career as Fleshmaster ended shortly after his humiliation at the hands of his fellow heroes during the Caped Justice Awards ceremonies. After the disappearance of Fleshmaster, dWARf! debuted and became popular amongst the senior members of the Superhomeys. Despite his newfound popularity with this new persona, dWARf!/Fleshmaster decides to exact revenge against his former tormentors-turned-friends. He sabotages the Caped Justice Awards ceremony by tainting the catered food with liquefied flesh from Wet Blanket, causing the majority of the attending heroes to temporarily lose their powers. After his defeat at the hands of Emp, dWARf! is captured by Manny in hopes of using dWARf!'s gene-altering powers to cure his cancer.

=== Femifist ===
Femifist is a female, costumed, news reporter for the Hero Network. She was the field reporter present at the Caped Justice Awards ceremony that was sabotaged by dWARf!. Femifist's superhuman abilities or attributes, if any, have not been demonstrated.

=== Heavy Artillery ===
Heavy Artillery is a male member of the Superhomeys. Heavy Artillery appears to be a human who has, at some point, had his head and neck completely replaced with some sort of mounted artillery gun. Heavy Artillery is also shown to be openly gay.

=== Homunculoid ===
Homunculoid is a posthuman male member of the Superhomeys. Homunculoid's powers have not been explicitly defined, but he seems to possess enhanced senses, perhaps due to his enlarged facial features and oversized hands. Homunculoid was killed during the ambush on Willy Pete.

=== Jugganaut ===
Jugganaut is a heroine whose outfit intentionally draws attention to her large breasts. Jugganaut was shown briefly being interviewed at the Caped Justice Awards. Previous to that, she was referenced by Emp as an example of a female hero who tries to capitalize on her sexual appeal.

=== Makro ===
Makro is a female, costumed heroine wearing a slightly armored jumpsuit, and wielding some degree of superstrength and enduranc. She hosts the Superdirty Jobs show on the HeroNET. As such, she is tasked to find the heroes doing less glamorous jobs, away from the limelight (from mere steel workers tasked with the manufacture of enhanced materials to hunters of exotic/alien species), telling of their exploits to the large public.

=== Mindfuck ===
Mindfuck is a member of the Superhomeys who possesses powerful psychic abilities. She was previously possessed by her brother, the villain Neurospear, and forced to cut out her tongue and eyes. Mindfuck primarily communicates via telepathy and uses a cybernetic visor that affords her vision. In cases where her visor has been damaged beyond use, she can "piggyback" others by tapping into their Sensorium.

For the majority of Volume 5, Mindfuck becomes a friend and advisor to Emp, who had recently come under scrutiny from her Superhomey colleagues following the events of the Caped Justice Awards. Mindfuck is killed by the end of Volume 5 when the Joint Superteam Space Station is destroyed.

=== Maid Man ===
Maid Man is a lone superhero who dresses and uses weapons thematically designed to imply he is a French Maid or housekeeper. His personality, manner of speech, attitude towards crime, fighting style and weaponry, all a spoof of Batman. This is repeatedly used for injokes (ie, when asked if a burly man like him does not feel ridiculous dressing in a flimsy French Maid costume, he replies that he would feel much more embarrassed dressing as an animal, like a bat). Unlike the majority of superheroes in the Empowered series, Maid Man does not have any superhuman abilities. Despite this, he is well liked within the milieu of superheroes and is extremely capable of defending himself and others against beings with superhuman abilities. Maid Man is also one of the few heroes who treats Emp with respect and gives her salient advice. Initially introduced as a minor/background character, he takes on a leading role alongside Emp and her other friends in Volume 6.

=== Major Havoc ===
Major Havoc is a senior member of the Superhomeys, Major Havoc usually plays a large role in the various endeavors of the group. Because of his relative importance, Major Havoc is a braggart and somewhat of a simpleton. On a few occasions, Major Havoc has used his seniority to exploit the Superhomeys resources and trick Emp into sexual situations, both public and private, so that he may gratify himself to the images. Major Havoc's powers are not specifically mentioned, although he appears to possess superhuman strength and a high level of invulnerability to physical damage.

=== Mechzacouat ===
Mechzacouatl is a mechanical winged serpent who is a member of the Superhomeys. Although he has never been shown to speak, a one sided telephone conversation with Capitan Rivet demonstrates that he can. He is also said to be in a sexual relationship with Cybertiamat due to supervillain Soldier of Love's influence.

=== Ocelotina ===
Ocelotina is an ocelot-themed costumed performer who acts the part of a super heroine despite a complete lack of super powers, remarkable skills, or special technologies to support this appearance. Rather, her status and popularity appears to stem almost entirely from her self-promotion through "how-to" videos of dubious content and product endorsements.

=== Phallik ===
Phallik is a member of the Superhomeys who wields the Phallospear, a weapon resembling a phallus. He was killed in the ambush on Willy Pete. Phallik is revealed to be a bargainer and returns to life as a zombie who is dependant on the Phallospear to survive.

=== Protean ===
Protean is a posthuman member of the Superhomeys who was transformed into a semisolid mass of matter after contracting an extraterrestrial STD. Despite this change in his physiology, he has retained his intelligence and personality, and despite not having any distinguishable body parts besides hollow glowing "eyes", he retains all of his normal senses and is even able to speak.

=== Q Girl ===
Q Girl is a hero who appears as an alliterative example when Emp complains about the drawbacks of her hyper membrane super suit not functioning properly if she wears a cape to cover her behind. Q Girl is shown with a self-satisfied smile as her hero costume neatly covers her behind.

=== Robotomy ===
Robotomy is an artificial being that appears to be capable of independent thought and actions. Robotomy was killed in the failed ambush of Willy Pete.

=== Single Action ===
Single Action is a member of the Superhomeys who is themed after a cowboy. He sports a cowboy hat, boots, and riding chaps, as well as a pair of protective goggles. His superhero moniker is derived from his trademark weapons; a pair of laser-pistols that resemble single-action Colt 1851 Navy Revolvers. Although it is anachronistic, that he himself recognizes, to have laser pistols that require hand cocking of a hammer, he uses them because he thinks that they are "plumb cool".

=== Sistah Spooky ===
Sistah Spooky is a member of the Superhomeys who gained powers from making a deal with a demon who had been providing preternatural augmentation of physical appearance to the girls in her high school in exchange for their immortal souls. Through this, she was able to go on to become a superhero who is known for being sexually desirable as well as skilled in arcane magic. Despite her deep-set hatred for blondes, Theresa had, before the events told in the series, entered in a relationship with Mindfuck, which she later broke off, blaming the failure on Mindfuck sharing hidden similarity to her psychopathic brother. However her later death in volume 5 left Theresa deeply traumatized, reduced in a barely functional mindset, capable of functioning normally only with external aid and assurance.

=== Super Dawg ===
Super Dawg is a member of the Superhomeys who resembles an anthropomorphic dog.

=== Syndablokk ===
Syndablokk is a posthuman member of the Superhomeys whose head and hands are made of cinderblock. Syndablokk appears to have a full array of standard senses and is even able to communicate verbally, despite lacking all organs and structures that would normally facilitate this. This may be due in part to Syndablokk's ability to communicate with concrete, masonry, and pavement in a manner similar to psychometry, as well as animate these materials in a manner similar to telekinesis.

=== Turbobrain ===
Turbobrain is a cyborg and member of the Superhomeys who can create telekinetic shields. During an attack by Willy Pete, Turbobrain tries to shield both himself and Havoc from the fire, receiving third degree burns on his whole body but keeping Major Havoc safe. Major Havoc later burns his arms by trying to drag away Turbobrain, blaming Empowered for his current suffering

=== Yummy Mummy ===
Yummy Mummy is a mummified member of the Superhomeys. She largely makes cameo appearances.

== Villains ==
=== Anglerfish ===
Anglerfish is a posthuman supervillain with an anglerfish-like head. Anglerfish's bioluminescent lure, which he calls his "lurelight", induces powerful hallucinations in those that observe it.

=== Baby Bird ===
Baby Bird is a villain who resembles a large embryonic chick. Its flesh is resilient enough to withstand prolonged exposure to intense heat and fire. Baby Bird was sodomized to death and eaten by Willy Pete when the trio attempted to recruit Willy Pete.

=== Big Iron ===
Big Iron is a mechanical supervillain who threatens the city with a large bomb. Big Iron's indignation at the appearance of Emp, implication that he was not a "Heavy Hitter", is so great that he almost immediately abandons his plot.

=== Blunt Trauma ===
Blunt Trauma is a member of the "Apocalypse Clique" supervillain group who supports the legalization of marijuana. He has a skull-like head with oversized incisors on his lower jaw, a large marijuana cigar protruding from his mouth, and a ball mace in place of his right hand.

=== Chloroformaster ===
Chloroformaster is a fetishist who prefers to target unsuspecting heroines, who he uses chloroform to render unconscious. He is generally considered to be a nuisance rather than a real threat.

=== Crimera ===
Crimera is a villain resembling an anthropomorphic lion with a goat head at the end of his right arm and a dragon head at the head of his left arm. He resembles his namesake, the mythological chimera.

=== Deathmonger ===
Deathmonger is a villain who mounted a major attack on City Hall with the assistance of "Scythebots". She has absolute control over the bargainers, dead superheroes who -- having received their powers from supernatural beings and goddesses -- are unable to truly die, but keep inhabiting their corpses, kept functional by their own powers.

=== Doomsloth ===
Doomsloth is a villain who uses gauntlets equipped with three claws. He appears to be more concerned over his reputation with other villains than having his plot foiled.

=== Glue Gun Gil ===
Glue Gun Gil is a villain who uses hardened thermoplastic adhesive. He is a homage to the Marvel Comics supervillain Trapster (originally known as Paste Pot Pete).

=== Hand Cholo ===
Hand Cholo is a member of the Felonifive with large hands and a large hand in place of a head. The fingers on his head are fully capable of articulated movement.

=== Icy Mike ===
Icy Mike is a supervillain who Thugboy once worked for. Icy Mike's exploits seem to involve cryogenics and refrigeration technology. He has also mentioned that he makes frequent use of his "cryogun". Like most of the supervillains that Thugboy has been a lackey for, Icy Mike was eventually subdued and had most of his technology stolen by Thugboy.

=== Idea Man ===
Idea Man is a supervillain whose costume accentuates his ability to generate ideas for criminal plots. One of these plot is to use the disembodied brain of the villain Psychoblast to "unleash an apocalypse". To this end, Idea Man, who knows of Psychoblast's fetishes, had his henchmen seek out a person who suitably meets the criteria of a "sexy librarian".

=== Katastrophe ===
Katastrophe is a villain who was once a part of a trio with Kid Anglerfish and Baby Bird. Katastrophe wears a costume that appears to include the skull of a Smilodon, worn as a helmet, as well as small replicas worn on the backs of his hands. Katastrophe and Baby Bird were cannibalized and sodomized by Willy Pete.

=== Kid Anglerfish ===
Kid Anglerfish is a male posthuman villain and member of a villainous trio with Baby Bird and Katastrophe. He possesses a similar appearance and abilities to his father, the villain Anglerfish.

=== Killing Time ===
Killing Time, formerly known as Time^{2}, is a male costumed villain who uses time-related puns and uses weaponry based on timepieces. Killing Time does not have any actual powers and is shown to only be a threat if he manages to use one of his many hand-weapons, such as his "Chronoshillelagh" and "Chronobolo".

=== King Tyrant Lizard ===
King Tyrant Lizard, or "KTL", is a male posthuman supervillain and member of the Apocalypse Clique who resembles a dinosaur. King Tyrant Lizard derives his name for the English translation of Tyrannosaurus rex. King Tyrant Lizard possesses superhuman strength and is shown to have great resilience against blunt impacts as well as energy blasts. Before his transformation, King Tyrant Lizard was an angsty teenager named Jerome.

=== Laser Brain ===
Laser Brain is a member of the Felonifive with a large exposed brain.

=== Lone Gunman ===
Lone Gunman is a villain based on an outlaw of the American Old West. He is most likely a low-priority villain amongst heroes, as he has a very laid-back attitude and cocksure manner, even while committing robberies.

=== Manny ===
Manny is an 11-year-old patient at the Purple Paladin Memorial hospital who was diagnosed with terminal leukemia, which would deny him his dream of becoming a supervillain. Through the assistance of the Grant-A-Wish program and coercion from Sistah Spooky, Emp meets Manny and assists in granting his wish to experience the capture of a superhero. Soon after his experience in "capturing" Emp, Manny bypasses the security of the pharmacy for the Purple Paladin Memorial hospital and steals an extraterrestrial carcinogen known as "Mayfly". Manny ingests the Mayfly, which triggers rapid cerebral growth in him. In the aftermath of the sabotaged Caped Justice awards, Manny abducts dWARf! to devise a treatment for his condition.

=== Neurospear ===
Neurospear, originally known as Brainbow, is Mindfuck's younger brother. Originally a shy, nervous boy and pacifist, his telepathic powers forced him to constantly listen to the darker emotions and anxieties of other people. After being forced by other superheroes to create Willy Pete as an artificial container for several alien superpowers, Neurospear became convinced the only way to overcome his anxieties was to destroy his capacity to feel empathy or doubt, becoming a sociopathic terrorist. Neurospear escapes from cryogenic prison before the end of Volume 10 and possesses ThugBoy, Ninjette, and most of the Superhomies to use against Emp in a "trial" of both her abilities and out of anger at Mindfuck's death. He is defeated when Emp, working off information given to her by a remnant of Mindfuck's mind and with the assistance of Sistah Spooky, tricks him into attempting to seize control of her mind, allowing the remnant to stun Neurospear and kill him.

=== Quasarmodo ===
Quasarmodo is a minor supervillain who was briefly shown participating in an instructional video alongside Ocelotina. Through his participation in said video, and his status as an actual, if inept, villain, Ocelotina's validity as a "wannabe" costumed hero is brought into question.

=== Rum, Sodomy, and Lash ===
Rum, Sodomy, and Lash are a trio of villains themed after British naval culture. Rum is ordered to attend Alcoholics Anonymous meetings for his many DUIs and Sodomy leaves the group after becoming fed up with explaining that he only represents heterosexual sodomy. Lash takes on Rum and Somody's combined gimmicks, utilizing a heavy British accent, rum, and a bullwhip.

=== Spartan 3000 ===
Spartan 3000 is a Spartan-themed villain who Thugboy briefly worked for. Spartan 3000 was driven into bankruptcy by the underhanded dealing of the Witless Minions.

=== Super Caucasian ===
Super Caucasian is a white supremacist who will only hire Caucasian henchmen. Thugboy briefly worked for Super Caucasian, but was fired after he was uncovered to be Asian-American.

=== Weird Beard ===
Weird Beard is a member of the Felonifive with a long, flowing beard that is able to move and interact with objects like an extra appendage.

=== Wet Blanket ===
Wet Blanket is a member of the Felonifive who passively generates a 25-foot aura that nullifies superpowers.

=== Willy Pete ===
Willy Pete is a degenerate being whose primary focus in existence has been to find beings, of any gender, with enough resilience to withstand his intense heat so that he may have forced intercourse or sodomize them in their various orifices. Pete takes his name from the military jargon term for white phosphorus. While under normal conditions, Pete only produces temperatures in the hundreds to thousands of degrees; it was shown that he is capable of outputting fusion-level temperatures. It is later revealed that Pete is a "kludge mind", a psychokinetic construct used to hold a group of alien superpowers made by Neurospear as a weapon against an unknown threat, an act which led indirectly to Neurospear's madness. He is killed when Neurospear attempts to take control of him, but Pete fights off his influence, forcing Neurospear to unmake his creation.

== Other characters ==
=== The Caged Demonwolf ===
The Caged Demonwolf is a multidimensional energy being that was trapped in bondage gear by the Imperial Pimpotron. The Demonwolf often predicts events before they occur and speaks of things he was not around to experience. Although he is most commonly known as the Caged Demonwolf, he has been known to refer to himself in other alliterative names. Introduced as an antagonist, the Demonwolf gradually becomes more accepting of his situation and amicable to Emp, Thugboy, and Ninjette.

=== Ayakami-Clan ninja ===
The Ayakami Clan are a group of ninjas who were contracted by the Kaburagi clan to capture and return Ninjette to her clan. The Ayakami clan is apparently well studied in a form of ninjutsu that allows them to suppress extreme pain. This skill was greatly demonstrated during their attempt to capture Ninjette in a park. By the end of volume 3 of the Empowered series, numerous Ayakami clan ninja are killed in their attempt to capture Ninjette.

=== Nurse Foxtrot and Nurse Whiskey ===
Foxtrot and Whiskey are medical assistants who work for Big McLarge Huge. Foxtrot and Whiskey are very similar in appearance as well as appear to be examples of perfect or idealized human physiology. Whatever may be the impetus behind the nurses' appearances, it is most likely artificially induced, as some of the nurses in attendance of the Caped Justice Awards were shown to revert to a less-than-ideal physiology when they became affected by the tainted catered food. Whiskey and Foxtrot are named for the letters W and F in the NATO Phonetic Alphabet.

=== Oyuki-chan ===
Oyuki-chan is a ninja of the New Jersey-based Kaburagi ninja clan. Oyuki-chan expresses open contempt towards Ninjette because of her abandonment of the clan, but is somehow indebted to her; her animosity (and simultaneous indebtedness) seems mostly due to Ninjette using a permanent anti-pregnancy jutsu on her when they were younger, at Oyuki's request, which she may now as an adult severely regret. Like Ninjette, Oyuki-chan is a practitioner of ninjutsu. Oyuki-chan refers to herself only in the third person, and her speech is both extremely formal and extremely profane.

=== Imperial Pimpotron Alpha ===
Imperial Pimpotron Alpha is an extraterrestrial autonomous robot that abducts female alien specimens to serve in an intergalactic harem for an unnamed "Cosmic Emperor".
