= DR-3 (Dominican Republic highway) =

Highway in the Dominican Republic

DR-3
- Expreso 27 de Febrero; Expreso de las Americas; Autopista De las Americas; Autovia del Este; Autopista El Coral

Major junctions
- West end: Plaza de la Bandera, Santo Domingo, DR
- DR-8 in Santo Domingo Este; DR-4 in San Pedro de Macorís; DR-4 in San Rafael del Yuma
- East end: Punta Cana, DR

Location
- Country: Dominican Republic
- Major cities: Santo Domingo, Santo Domingo Este, Boca Chica, San Pedro de Macorís, San Rafael del Yuma, La Romana,

Highway system
- Highways in the Dominican Republic

DR-3 is one of three main dual carriageway highways of the Dominican Republic, connecting Santo Domingo to the eastern cities of the republic. The highway begins at the Plaza de La Bandera, on the western side of Santo Domingo, and travels eastward through downtown Santo Domingo and continues east to Santo Domingo Este. Outside Santo Domingo it runs roughly parallel to the Caribbean Sea toward the eastern cities of the nation. DR-3 creates a rapid connection to the Las Américas International Airport, located only 30 kilometers east of Santo Domingo. DR-3 continues eastward to the beach towns of Andrés and Boca Chica. DR-3 then continues east and slightly north to the eastern cities of San Pedro de Macorís, La Romana, and Higüey and has connections to the routes that lead to the resort towns of Bayahibe, Bávaro, and Punta Cana. DR-3 has been part of a long program to improve, expand, and modernize the highways of the Republic. Most of DR-3 has been expanded to two or three lanes of traffic each way, making it the only complete highway in the country.

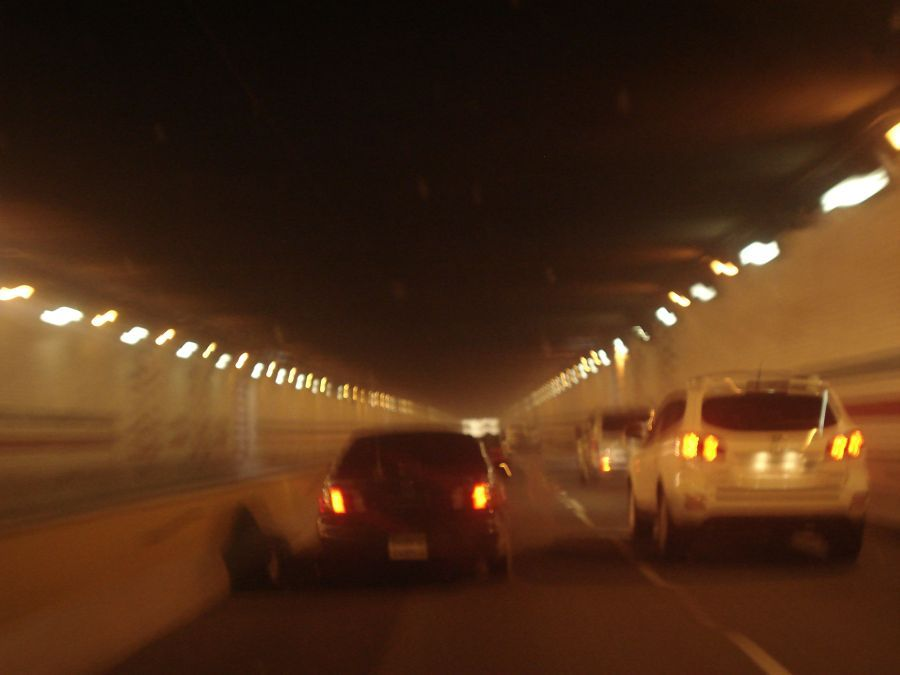
Expreso 27 de Febrero Tunnel in Downtown Santo Domingo (Distrito Nacional)

== Route description ==
DR-3 is called by different names from its western terminus in Plaza de la Bandera, Santo Domingo, Distrito Nacional to San Rafael del Yuma in the eastern corner of the country. It connects the capital of the country with the eastern region known for its heavily tourist oriented economy. DR-3 travels to the major cities of the east such as San Pedro De Macorís and La Romana and the tourist towns of Bávaro, Punta Cana and Bayahibe. Together with DR-4 it connects the east with the metropolitan area of Santo Domingo.

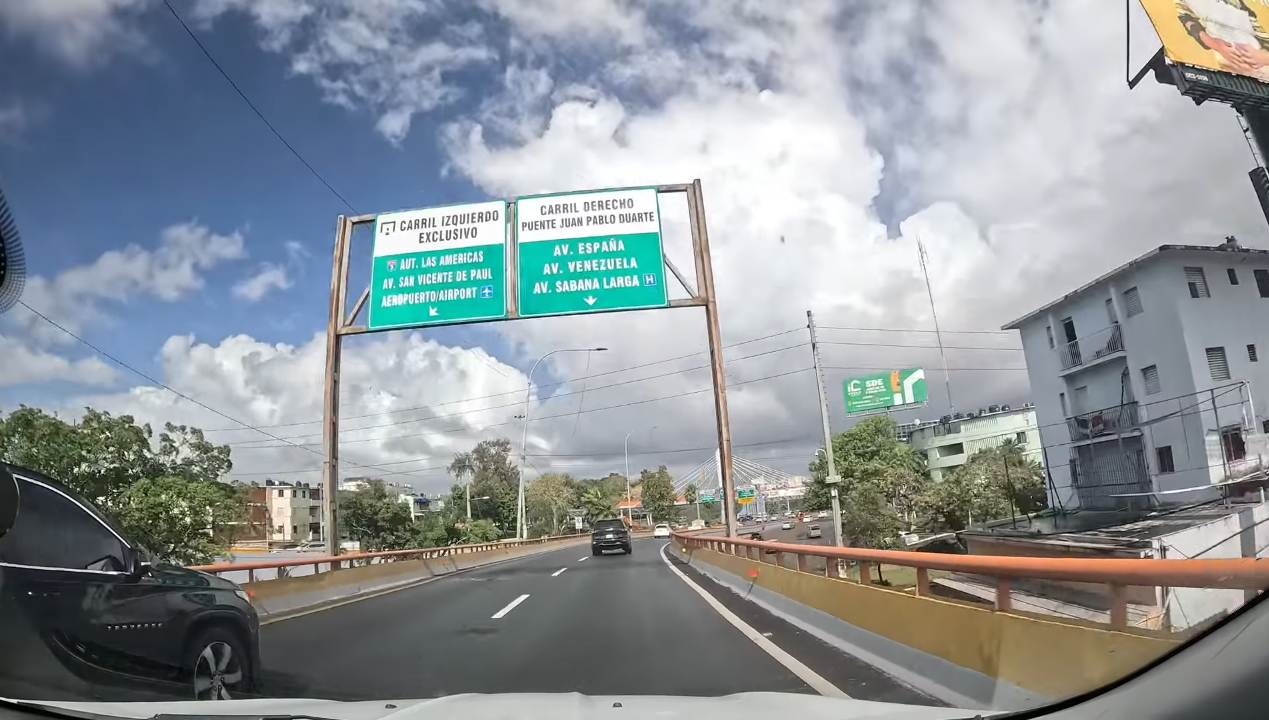

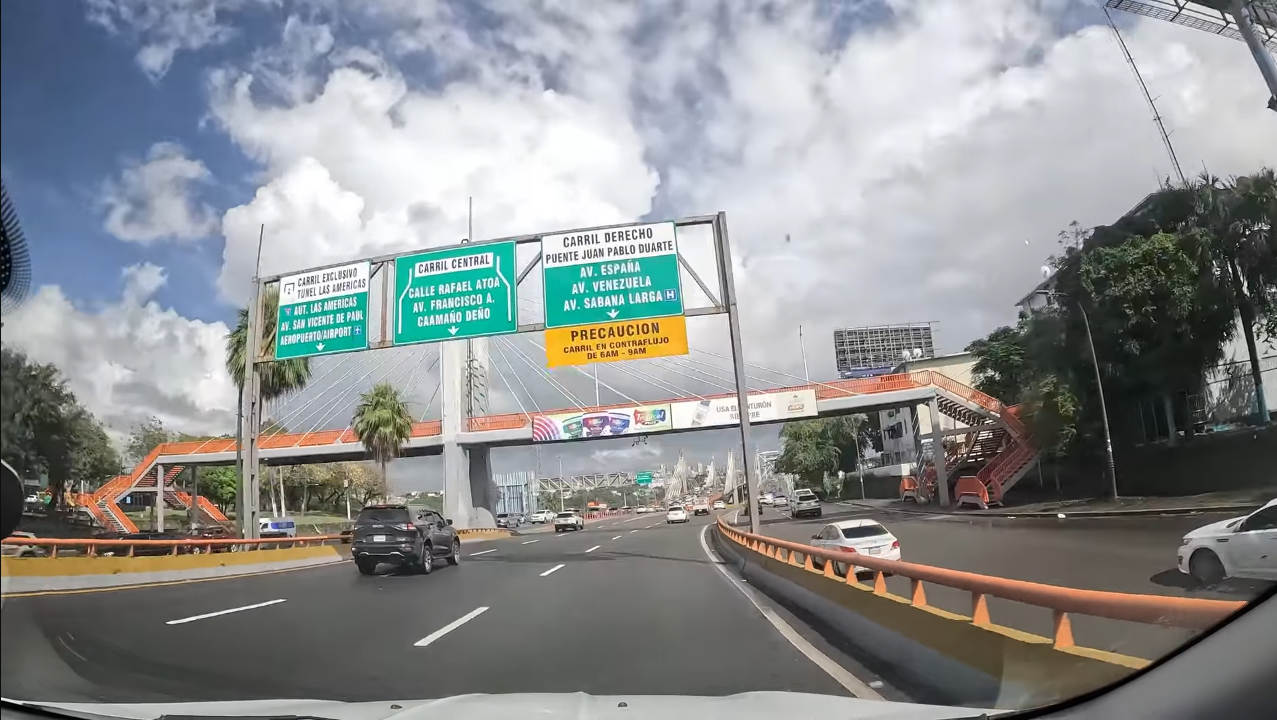

=== Expreso 27 de Febrero/Expreso de las Americas ===
At the Plaza de la Bandera, DR-3 begins its run named Expreso 27 de Febrero through the downtown districts of Santo Domingo with a series of tunnels and underground passes, making it an important main avenue of the city. There is a kilometer-long tunnel that crosses below Winston Churchill and Abraham Lincoln avenues, and short tunnels crossing below Tiradentes and Maximo Gomez avenues. A T-interchange and a tunnel were completed at the Ortega y Gasset avenue in 2011. It then continues its route east, also intersecting Maximo Gomez avenue, the main north–south thoroughfare of the city. The corridor continues east of downtown via the use of a single long grade-separated viaduct with exits that connect the expreso with the southern borders of working-class neighborhoods such as Miraflores, Villa Consuelo, and Mejoramiento Social. The viaduct continues above the San Martin, Juan Pablo Duarte, and Josefa Brea avenues of the city until its end in the Ozama River. As it reaches the border of the Distrito Nacional it crosses the Ozama River via the Juan Pablo Duarte and Prof. Juan Bosch bridges.

DR-3 continues through Santo Domingo Este, renamed as Expreso de Las Americas, with another kilometer-long tunnel below Venezuela and Sabana Larga avenues and a series of grade overpasses below intersections of San Vicente de Paul and San Isidro, with a T-interchange yet to be completed in Estados Unidos avenue. Slightly further east, the Expreso connects with the Charles de Gaulle beltway of the city. Expreso de Las Américas serves as the main urban corridor of Santo Domingo Este and serves as a rapid connection to Downtown and the Distrito Nacional where most of the jobs of the city are located.

=== Autopista de las Américas ===
After exiting the municipality of center of Santo Domingo Este, the highway becomes a limited-access highway and runs parallel to the Caribbean Sea with six lanes of highway and a two-way, four-lane service road on the north side. It has different vehicular overpasses towards the Aeropuerto Internacional de Las Américas. Only 15 kilometers east of Greater Santo Domingo there is a toll booth for those entering the airport and traveling outside the bounds of the area.

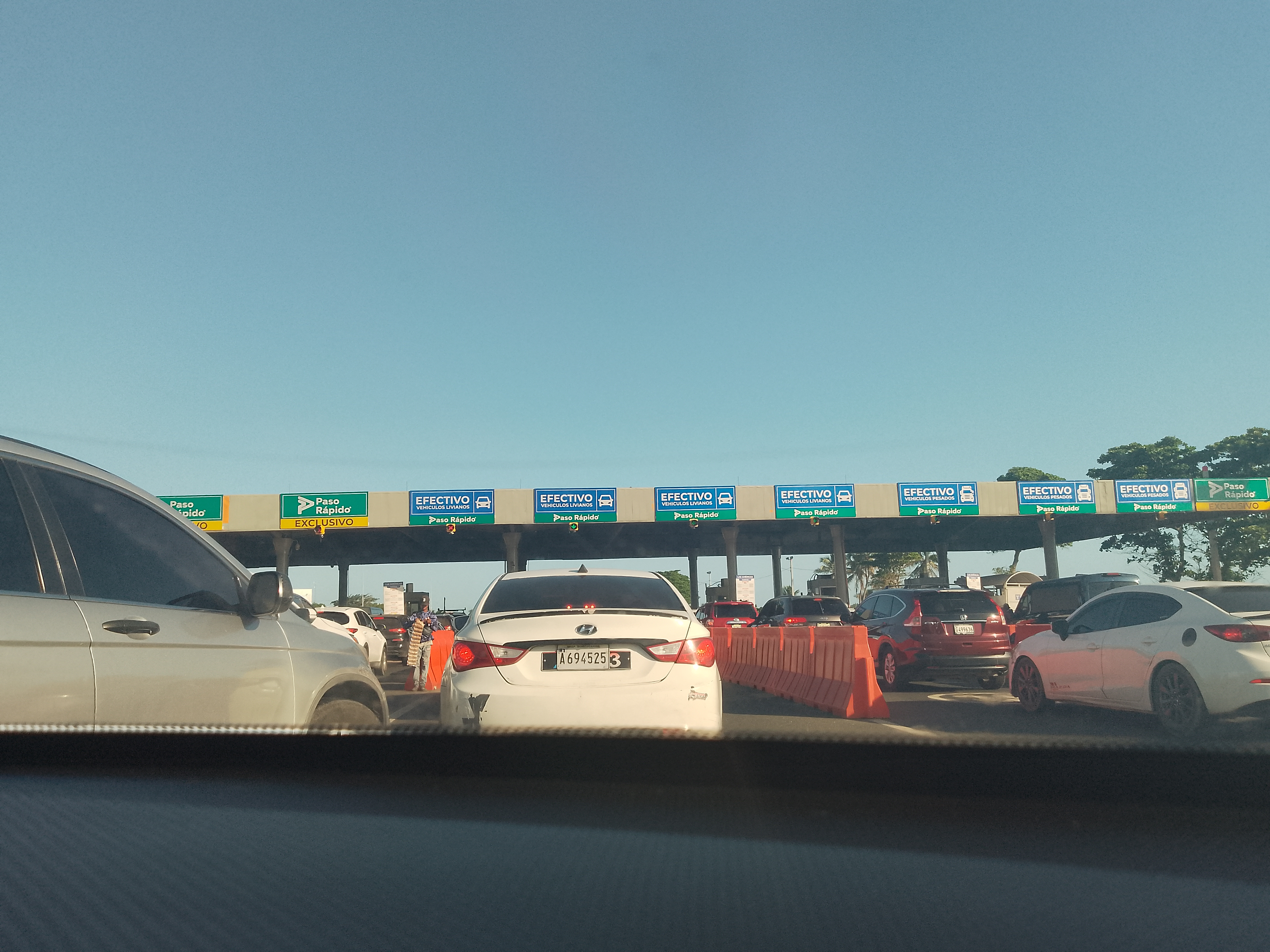
Toll of Autopista Las Américas at kilometer 22

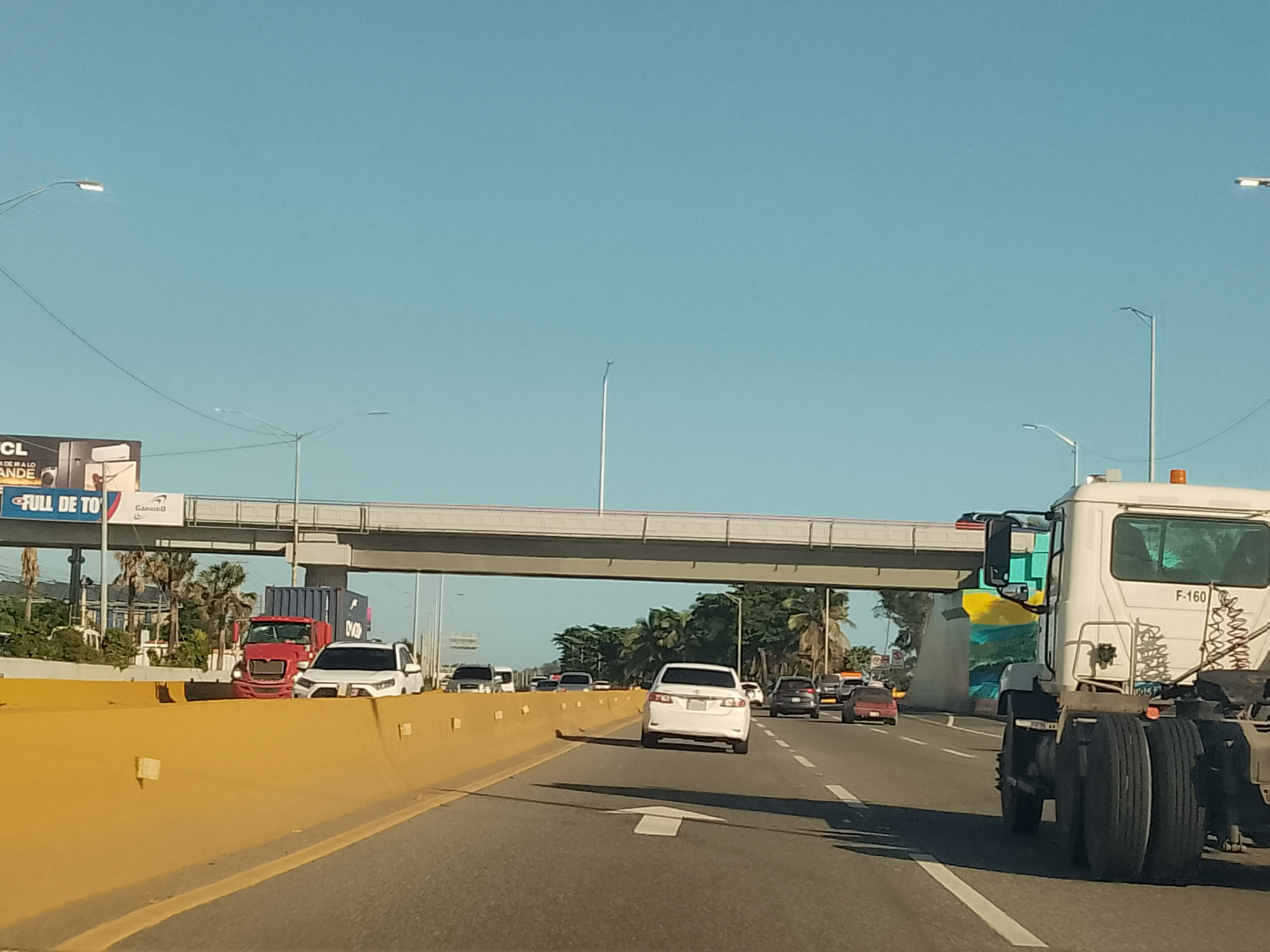
Autopista Las Américas at kilometer 12 near the viaduct of the Avenida Hipódromo

This section of the highway is one of the best in the country in terms of quality and has been improved several times since the 2003 Pan American Games. The portion from Santo Domingo Este to here is also the only true limited-access highway in the country as it contains an actual service road which allows faster traveling speeds for motorists. This portion of DR-3 (specifically when traveling eastbound) is also very dangerous due to its proximity to the Caribbean Sea, and has been the cause of many fatal slip-off accidents; this problem is yet to be addressed by the Dominican authorities.

=== Autovia del Este ===
East of the airport the highway bisects the beach towns of Andres and Boca Chica, greatly reducing travel speeds for a 2-3 kilometer distance due to improvised intersections and lack of proper exits; this problem is currently being addressed by the Dominican authorities and improvements over this short section of highway are underway. DR-3 continues its trip eastward, bypassing Juan Dolio (over the north) but providing a connection to the Boulevard de Juan Dolio which enters the popular resort town. To the east of Juan Dolio lies the city of San Pedro de Macorís which DR-3 bypasses slightly over the north of the city. East of SPM is La Romana, the easternmost city DR-3 directly connects to Santo Domingo. DR-3 ends near the town of San Rafael del Yuma in La Altagracia Province, where it intersects with DR-4. Local routes continue eastward and provide a connection to the internationally renowned tourist towns of Punta Cana and Bávaro located in the eastern extremes. The highway connects Santo Domingo to the eastern part of the country with a mere four-hour drive. Many upgrades and expansion plans are designed to improve this highway in the near future; these plans are part of Viadom, a national project to improve national infrastructure.

== Recent and future construction ==
Currently the Ministry of Public Works of Santo Domingo is constructing a series of tunnels in Expreso 27 de Febrero in conjunction with the Corredor Duarte, which will finalize the corridor and make it express from Winston Churchill Avenue to the Plaza de la Bandera, which is the only remaining section of the expreso with no grade separation at important intersections. The tunnels were finished in August 2011.

In Boca Chica, order breaks down due to construction and repairs being done to improve this part of the highway. Many streets of Boca Chica still intersect the highway, greatly reducing travel speed and causing slowdowns and unsafe travel relative to the rest of the highway. The Dominican government is currently trying to resolve this issue by expanding the highway and adding service roads to improve traveling speeds.

In 2002 the Autopista de las Américas was renovated by placing new light bulbs and service stops in the middle of the highway while making it a three-lane expressway. This improvement helped eliminate traffic as it entered the Greater Santo Domingo Area. After seeing the results of these improvements the government decided to renovate the Autovia Del Este from AILA to San Pedro De Macorís. In 2006, the Dominican government began a project to reroute the highway north of the SPM town to avoid local traffic. As a result, the Mauricio Báez Bridge was constructed over the Higuamo River. Today, motorists no longer have to pass through the congested city streets of SPM in order to drive to destinations in the east.

In August 2012, the government opened a new four-lane highway named Autopista del Coral which runs non-stop from La Romana to Punta Cana (one of the most popular tourist regions of the country). This section became part of the DR-3 designation as soon as it was opened.

The Boulevard del Este it is a highway that connects the Autopista del Coral and goes into Punta Cana until it becomes the road to Miches.

== Major intersections ==
This is a table of distance in kilometers from Santo Domingo, one of the major cities located along the DR-3.

| Cities | Major intersections | Distance from Santo Domingo |
|---|---|---|
| Santo Domingo | DR-4, DR-2 | 0 km, begins here |
| Santo Domingo Este | DR-4 | Approximately 5 km |
| Boca Chica | -- | -- |
| San Pedro de Macorís | DR-Route 102, DR-Local 829 | 70 km |
| La Romana | DR-Route 101 | 110 km |
| San Rafael del Yuma | DR-4 | --, ends here |

== See also ==
- Highways and routes in the Dominican Republic
