= DR 6 (nebula) =

Star cluster in the Milky Way

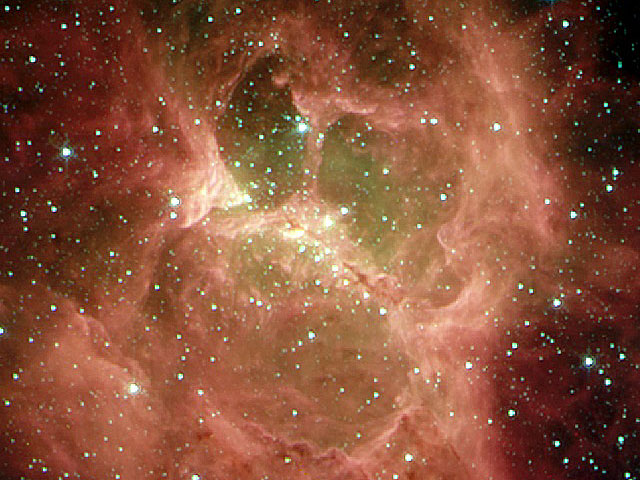
- DR 6 Nebula imaged by Spitzer Space Telescope

Observation data (J2000 epoch)
- Right ascension: 20^{h} 27^{m} 13.1^{s}
- Declination: +39° 26′ 08″
- Apparent dimensions (V): 3.7′ × 2.9′

Physical characteristics
- Other designations: "Galactic Ghoul"

Associations
- Constellation: Cygnus

DR 6 is a star forming region in the Milky Way galaxy. The nebula includes a cluster of about 10 large newborn stars, each roughly ten to twenty times the size of the Sun. It was discovered by astronomers at NASA with the Spitzer Space Telescope, viewing the nebula using infrared light.

The DR 6 nebula is located about 3,900 light-years away in the constellation Cygnus. The center of the nebula, where the ten stars are located, is roughly 3.5 light-years long, roughly equivalent to the distance between the Sun and Alpha Centauri, the closest star to the Sun. The areas of the nebula that appear green are mainly composed of gas, while the parts that seem to be red are made of dust.

== "Galactic Ghoul" ==
The DR 6 nebula is nicknamed the "Galactic Ghoul" because of its resemblance to a human face; astronomers have described it as "some sort of freakish space face," emphasizing the cavity-like regions that look like eyes and a mouth. These large cavities are the result of "energetic light" and strong stellar wind that come from the ten stars in the center of the nebula (the part also known as the "nose").

Because of the nebula's spooky appearance, it was featured on the NASA website as the Astronomy Picture of the Day on All Hallows' Eve, November 1, 2004.
