= Villa Elisa, Dominican Republic =

Villa Elisa
- Location in Dominican Republic
- Coordinates: 19°41′N 71°16′W
- Country: Dominican Republic
- Province: Monte Cristi

Population
  - Total: 6,588

Villa Elisa is a small town located in Montecristi, Dominican Republic. It is known as a Municipal District since 1997 because of its faster development as a county. Its population is around 6,588 and is increasing. The founding person of Villa Elisa was Dona Maria Elisa Meyreles. She resided and began her business there. Later on more people decided to live in the zone.
