= San Rafael del Yuma =

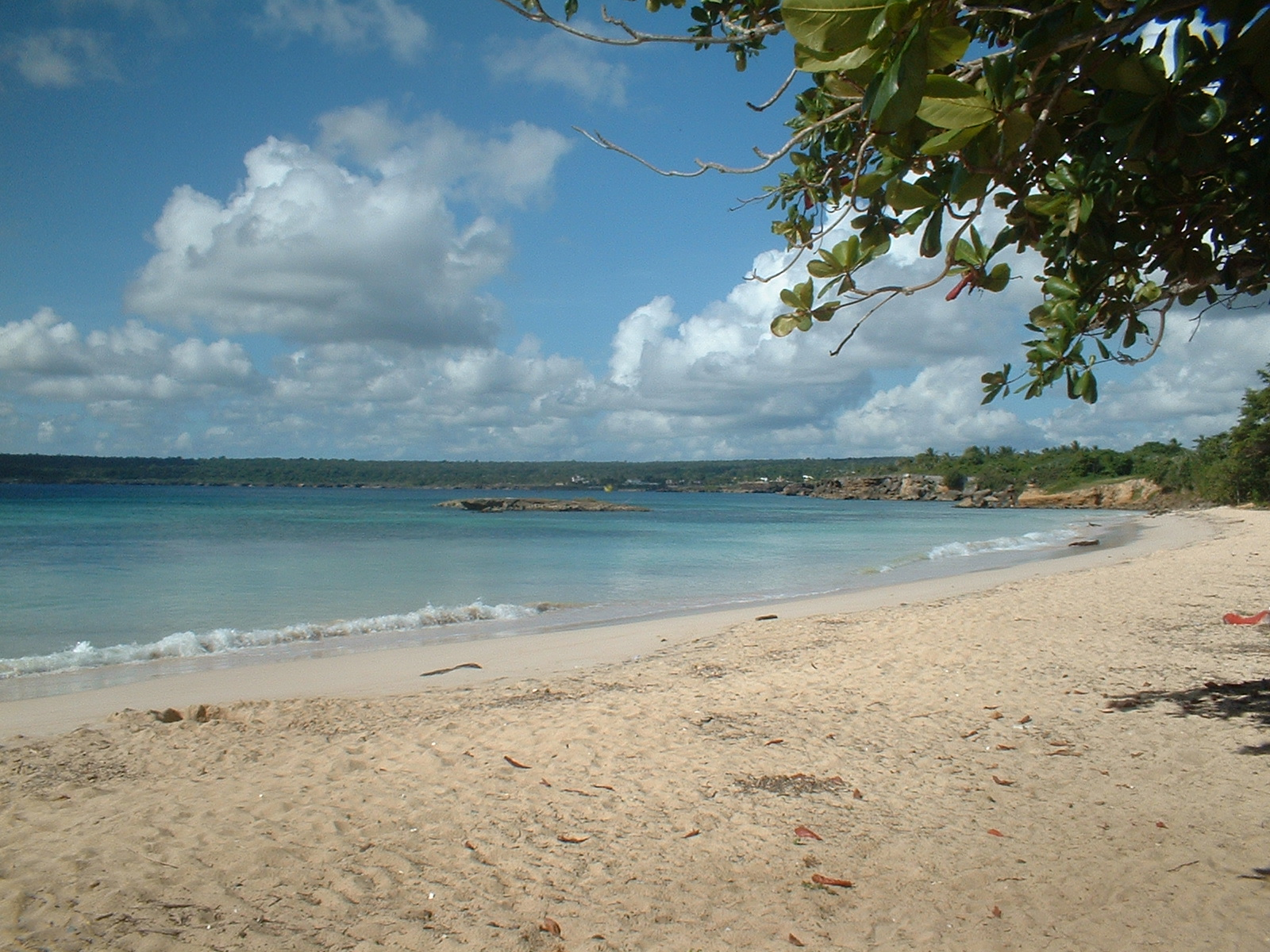
- The beach of Boca de Yuma

- Location within the Dominican Republic
- Coordinates: 18°27′12″N 68°42′36″W
- Country: Dominican Republic
- Province: La Altagracia
- Founded: 1608
- Municipality since: 1904

Area
  - Total: 981.2 km^{2} (378.8 sq mi)
- Elevation: 26 m (85 ft)

Population (2012)
  - Total: 46,687
  - Density: 47.58/km^{2} (123.2/sq mi)
  - Demonym: Yumense(a)
- Municipal Districts: 2

San Rafael del Yuma is a municipality located in the La Altagracia province of the Dominican Republic. It has a population of approximately 46,687 in 2012. The ruins of Juan Ponce de León's residence are located on a plateau located three kilometers from San Rafael de Yuma. The municipality is located 10 kilometers from Boca de Yuma.

== Climate ==
Climate data for San Rafael del Yuma (1961–1990)
Month	Jan	Feb	Mar	Apr	May	Jun	Jul	Aug	Sep	Oct	Nov	Dec	Year
Record high °C (°F)	34.5 (94.1)	34.0 (93.2)	36.0 (96.8)	36.5 (97.7)	36.5 (97.7)	37.8 (100.0)	39.1 (102.4)	39.5 (103.1)	38.6 (101.5)	36.5 (97.7)	35.2 (95.4)	35.0 (95.0)	39.5 (103.1)
Mean daily maximum °C (°F)	29.4 (84.9)	29.9 (85.8)	31.2 (88.2)	32.0 (89.6)	32.6 (90.7)	33.2 (91.8)	33.9 (93.0)	33.9 (93.0)	33.7 (92.7)	32.6 (90.7)	31.0 (87.8)	29.9 (85.8)	31.9 (89.4)
Mean daily minimum °C (°F)	19.1 (66.4)	19.1 (66.4)	19.9 (67.8)	20.3 (68.5)	22.0 (71.6)	22.3 (72.1)	22.9 (73.2)	23.0 (73.4)	22.7 (72.9)	22.2 (72.0)	21.0 (69.8)	19.8 (67.6)	21.2 (70.2)
Record low °C (°F)	12.8 (55.0)	12.3 (54.1)	12.1 (53.8)	10.5 (50.9)	15.0 (59.0)	16.0 (60.8)	16.0 (60.8)	15.5 (59.9)	18.1 (64.6)	18.2 (64.8)	14.5 (58.1)	14.0 (57.2)	10.5 (50.9)
Average rainfall mm (inches)	77.3 (3.04)	59.7 (2.35)	70.7 (2.78)	71.7 (2.82)	178.3 (7.02)	98.2 (3.87)	95.5 (3.76)	121.7 (4.79)	149.6 (5.89)	202.4 (7.97)	144.9 (5.70)	95.9 (3.78)	1,365.9 (53.78)
Average rainy days (≥ 1.0 mm)	9.6	8.3	7.7	6.8	11.3	9.7	10.7	10.9	11.1	13.7	11.5	11.7	123.0
Source: NOAA

== Sectors ==
The city is divided into 16 sectors that are,

- Banda Abajo
- Bayahíbe
- Bejucal Abajo
- Boca del Yuma
- Cabo Falso
- Coral
- Gato
- Jaragua Abajo
- La Piñita
- Las Joyas del Mar
- Mata Chalupe
- Punta Papayo
- San José del Yuma
- San Rafael
- Yuma Abajo
- Yuma Arriba
