= Highways and routes in the Dominican Republic =

There are various highways and routes in the Dominican Republic. They are built and maintained by the Ministry of Public Works and Communication (Spanish: Ministerio de Obras Públicas y Comunicaciones (República Dominicana)) or MOPC. Overall the system is centered around Greater Santo Domingo, where the country's capital is located. The Fideicomiso RD Vial regulates tolls (peajes) along the main network.

According to MOPC there are 1,395 km (867 miles) of main (troncal) roads, 2,412 km (1,499 miles) of secondary roads and 1,620 km (1,007 miles) of tertiary or regional roads.

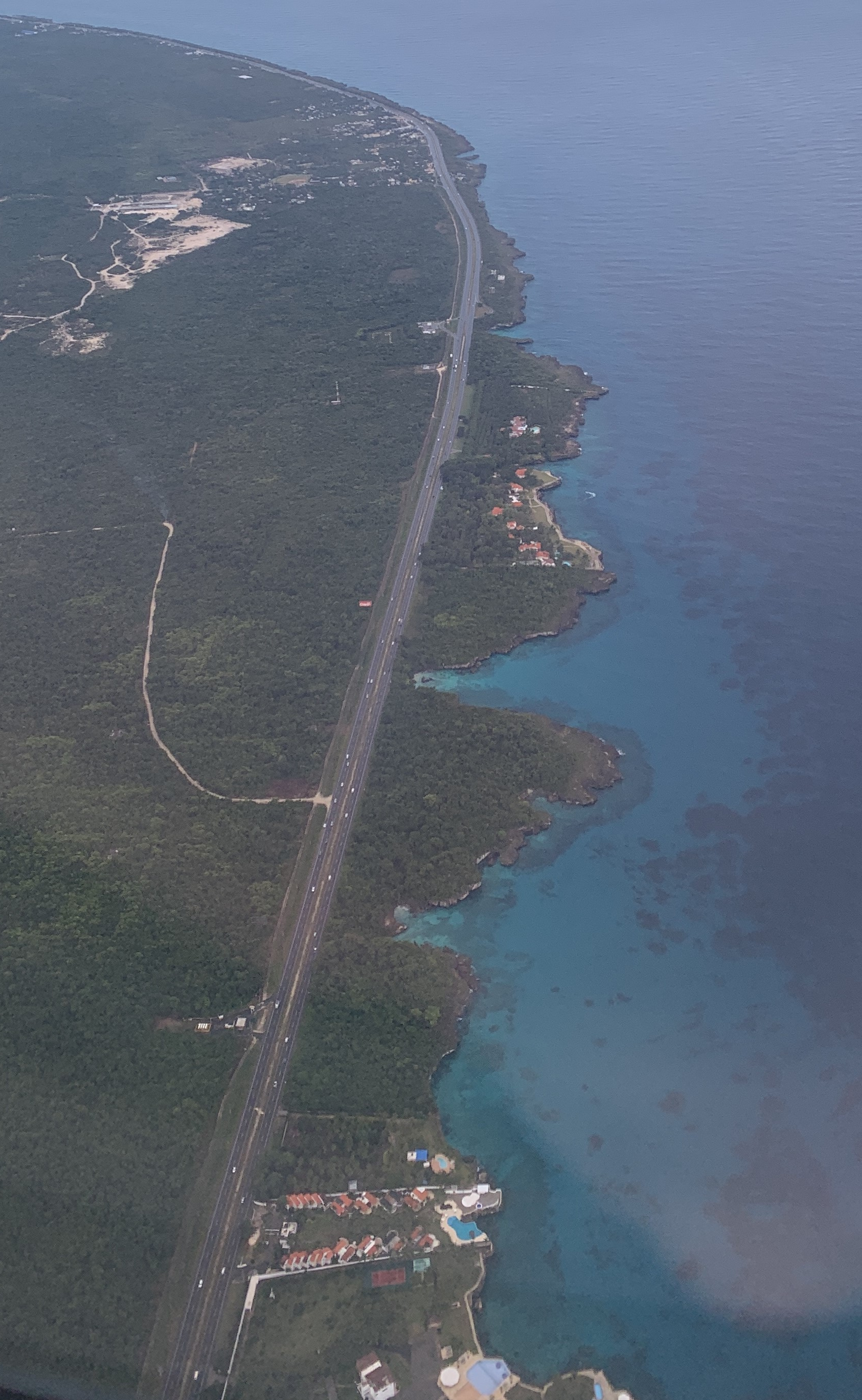
Aerial view of the Autovia del Este (part of the DR-3), near Boca Chica

Road sign in the Dominican Republic

== Numbering of the roads ==
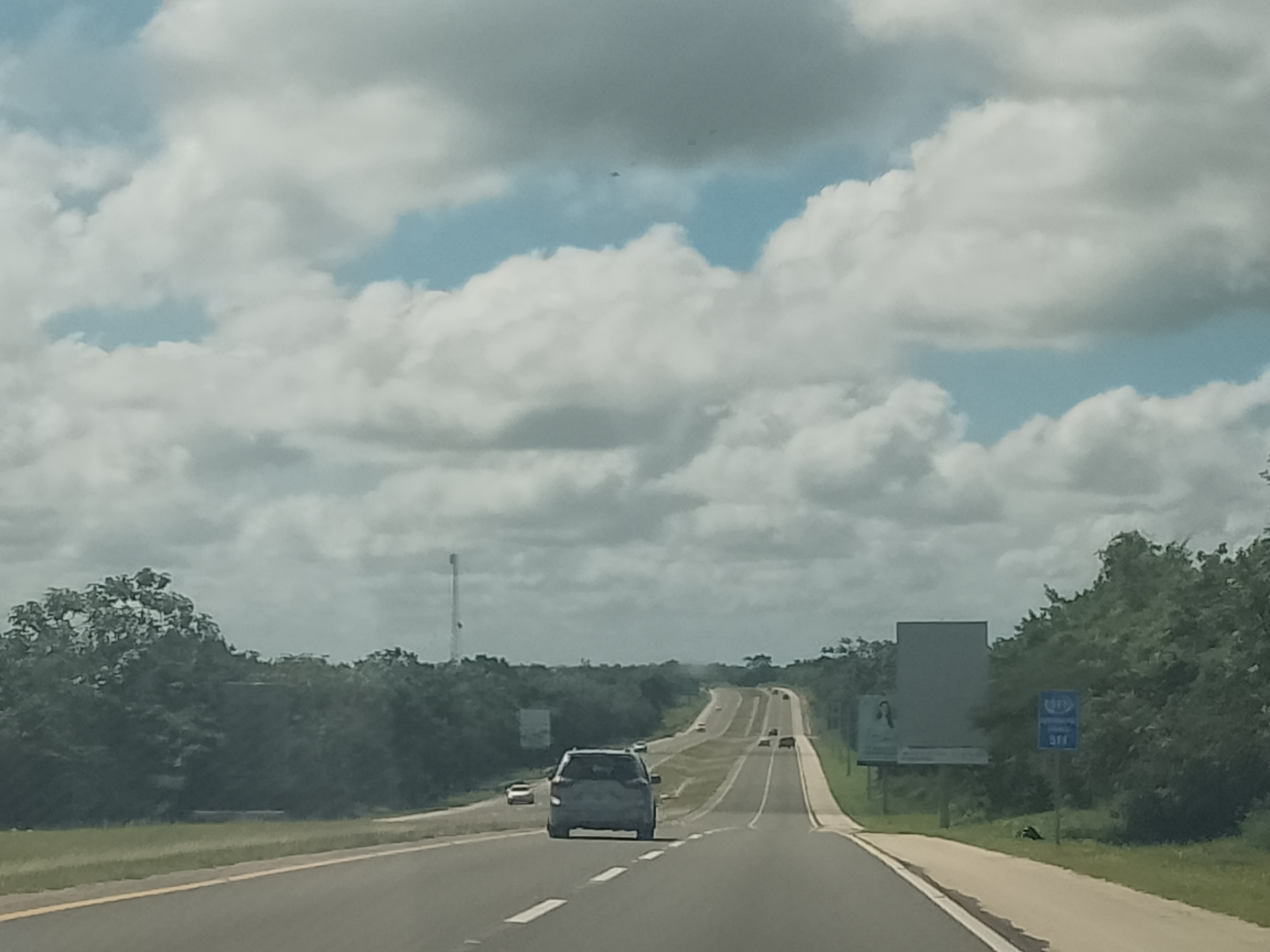
DR-3: Autopista del Coral between the Carretera Mella (DR-4) and Punta Cana

Roads in Dominican Republic are categorized as trunk (troncal) roads, secondary roads, and tertiary roads:

Trunk roads – numbered from 1 to 9 (e. g. DR-3, Santo Domingo to Miches)

Secondary roads – numbered from 10 to 200. (e. g. DR-12, also known as Carretera de Constanza)

Tertiary roads – numbered from 200 to 900. (e. g. DR-510, also known as Carretera Máximo Gómez, from Baní to Las Calderas)

== See also ==
- Transport in the Dominican Republic
