= Instituto de Ciencias Exactas =

Instituto de Ciencias Exactas (INCE) is a university in Santo Domingo in the Dominican Republic.

It was founded under the auspices of the Foundation National Institute of Sciences Inc., March 18, 1974, through Executive Order No. 5418 and then with the Decree No. 415 of December 19 of that same year, was authorized to become the sixth college in the country.

Training is focused on the following areas:

- Economy and Finance,
- Accounting,
- Business Administration,
- Marketing,
- Law,
- Engineering and
- Architecture
