= Dominican Republic =

Island country in the Caribbean

Dominican Republic República Dominicana (Spanish)
- Flag Coat of arms
- Motto: Dios, Patria, Libertad "God, Homeland, Freedom"
- Anthem: Quisqueyanos valientes "Valiant Quisqueyans"
- Interactive map of the Dominican Republic and its maritime boundary
- Capital and largest city: Santo Domingo; 18°27′N 69°56′W
- Official languages: Spanish
- Other languages: See below
- Ethnic groups (2022): 71.72% Mixed; 18.70% White; 7.45% Black; 0.33% East Asian; 0.37% other; 1.43% no answer
- Religion (2024): 72.9% Christianity; 42.6% Catholicism; 30% Protestantism; 0.3% other Christian; 25% no religion; 1% other; 1.1% unspecified
- Demonyms: Dominican; Quisqueyan (colloquial)
- Government: Unitary presidential republic
  - President: Luis Abinader
  - Vice President: Raquel Peña
- Legislature: Congress
  - Upper house: Senate
  - Lower house: Chamber of Deputies

Formation
  - Ephemeral Independence: 1821–1822
  - First Republic: 1844–1861
  - Second Republic: 1865–1916
  - Third Republic: 1924–1965
  - Fourth Republic: 1966–present

Area
  - Total: 48,671 km^{2} (18,792 sq mi) (128th)
  - Water (%): 0.7

Population
  - 2025 estimate: ▲11,532,151 (88th)
  - Density: 220/km^{2} (569.8/sq mi) (64th)
- GDP (PPP): 2026 estimate
  - Total: ▲$357.746 billion (64th)
  - Per capita: ▲$32,597 (67th)
- GDP (nominal): 2026 estimate
  - Total: ▲$145.362 billion (64th)
  - Per capita: ▲$13,245 (74th)
- Gini (2024): ▲39 medium inequality
- HDI (2023): ▲0.776 high (89th)
- Currency: Dominican peso (RD$) (DOP)
- Time zone: UTC−04:00 (AST)
- Date format: dd/mm/yyyy or dd-mm-yyyy
- Calling code: +1
- ISO 3166 code: DO
- Internet TLD: .do

The Dominican Republic (Note: /dəˈmɪnɪkən/ də-MIN-ik-ən; Spanish: República Dominicana, pronounced [reˈpuβlika ðominiˈkana]) is an island country on the eastern part of the Caribbean island of Hispaniola in the Greater Antilles of the Caribbean Sea in the North Atlantic Ocean. It shares a maritime border with Puerto Rico to the east and a land border with Haiti to the west, occupying the eastern five-eighths of Hispaniola which, along with Saint Martin, is one of only two islands in the Caribbean shared by two sovereign states. In the Antilles, the country is the second-largest by area after Cuba at 48,671 square kilometers (18,792 sq mi) and the second most populous after Haiti with approximately 11.4 million people in 2024, of whom 3.6 million reside in the metropolitan area of Santo Domingo, the capital city.

Indigenous peoples had inhabited Hispaniola prior to European contact, including the Taíno, who divided it into five chiefdoms. Christopher Columbus claimed the island for Castile, landing there on his first voyage in 1492. The colony of Santo Domingo became the site of the first permanent European settlement in the Americas. In 1697, Spain recognized French dominion over the western third of the island, which became the independent First Empire of Haiti in 1804. A group of Dominicans deposed the Spanish governor and declared independence from Spain in November 1821, but were annexed by Haiti in February 1822. Independence came 22 years later in 1844, after victory in the Dominican War of Independence. The next 72 years saw several civil wars, corrupt dictatorships, failed invasions by Haiti, and a brief return to Spanish colonial status, before permanently ousting the Spanish during the Dominican Restoration War of 1863–1865. The United States occupied the Dominican Republic from 1916 to 1924, followed by the dictatorship of Rafael Trujillo, ruling from 1930 until his assassination in 1961. Juan Bosch was elected president in 1962 but was deposed in a military coup in 1963. The Dominican Civil War of 1965 preceded a second American occupation and the authoritarian rule of Joaquín Balaguer (1966–1978 and 1986–1996). Since 1996, the Dominican Republic has moved towards representative democracy.

The Dominican Republic has the largest economy in the Caribbean and the seventh-largest in Latin America. The country has had the fastest-growing economy in the Western Hemisphere – with an average real GDP growth rate of 5.3% between 1992 and 2018. GDP growth in 2014 and 2015 reached 7.3 and 7.0%, respectively, the highest in the Western Hemisphere. Recent growth has been driven by construction, manufacturing, tourism, and mining. The country is the site of the world's third largest gold mine in terms of production, the Pueblo Viejo mine. The gold production of the country was 31 metric tonnes in 2015.

The Dominican Republic is the most visited destination in the Caribbean. A geographically diverse nation, the country is home to both the Caribbean's tallest mountain peak, Pico Duarte, and the Caribbean's largest lake and lowest point, Lake Enriquillo. The island has an average temperature of 26 °C (78.8 °F) and great climatic and biological diversity. The country is also the site of the first cathedral, palace, monastery, and fortress built in the Americas, located in Santo Domingo's Colonial Zone, a World Heritage Site.

== Etymology ==
The name Dominican originates from Saint Dominic, the patron saint of astronomers, and founder of the Dominican Order. The Dominican Order established what is now known as the Universidad Autónoma de Santo Domingo, the first university in the New World.

For most of its history, up until independence, the colony was known simply as Santo Domingo and continued to be commonly known as such in English until the early 20th century. The residents were called "Dominicans" (Dominicanos), the adjectival form of "Domingo", and as such, the revolutionaries named their newly independent country the "Dominican Republic" (la República Dominicana).

In the national anthem of the Dominican Republic (himno nacional de la República Dominicana), the poetic term "Quisqueyans" (Quisqueyanos) is used instead of "Dominicans". The word "Quisqueya" derives from the Ciguayo language, and means "mother of the lands". It is often used in songs as another name for the country. The name of the country in English is often shortened to "the D.R." (la R.D.), but this is rare in Spanish.

== History ==
=== Pre-Columbian era ===
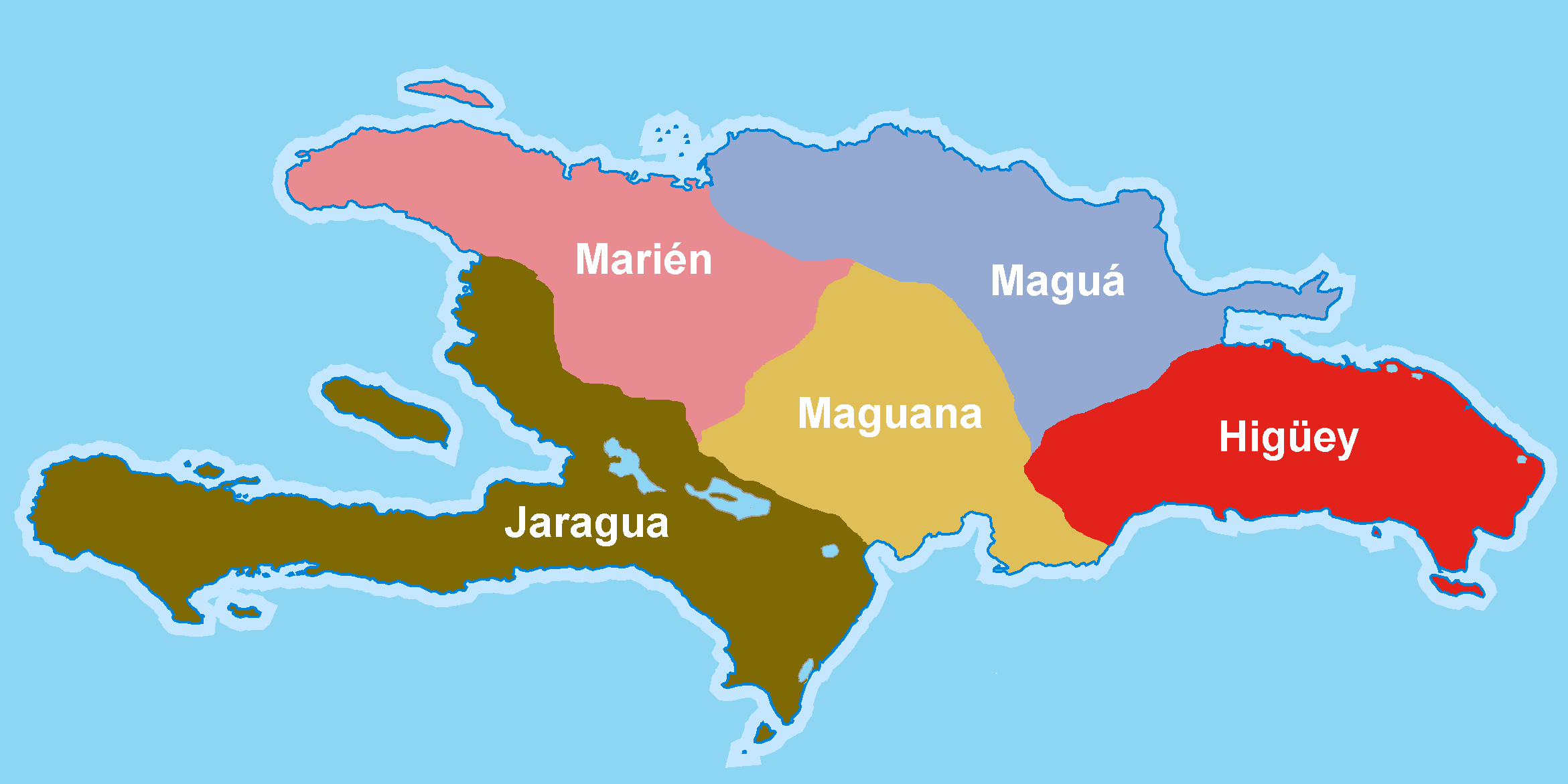
The five caciquedoms of Hispaniola (c. 1492)

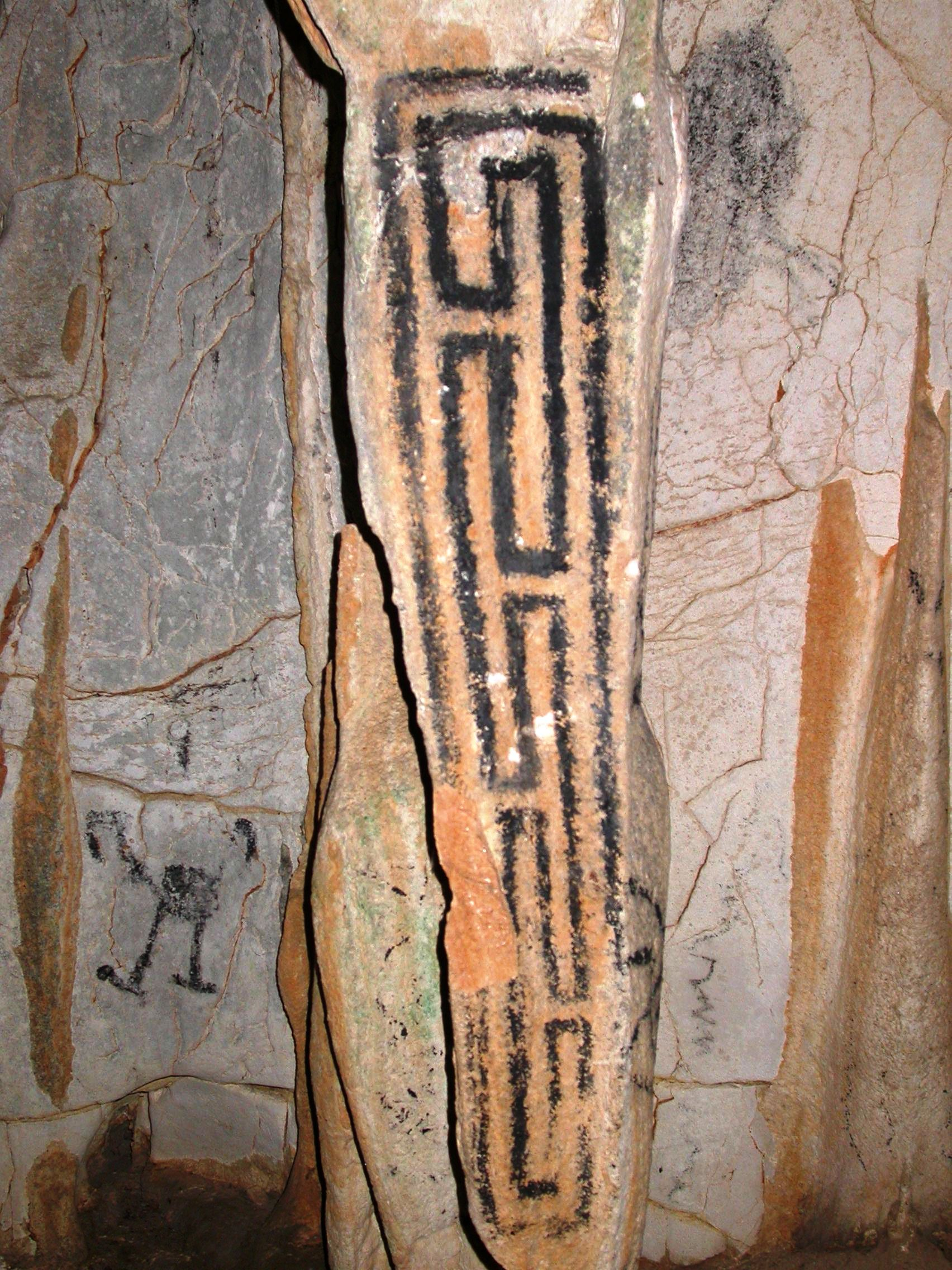
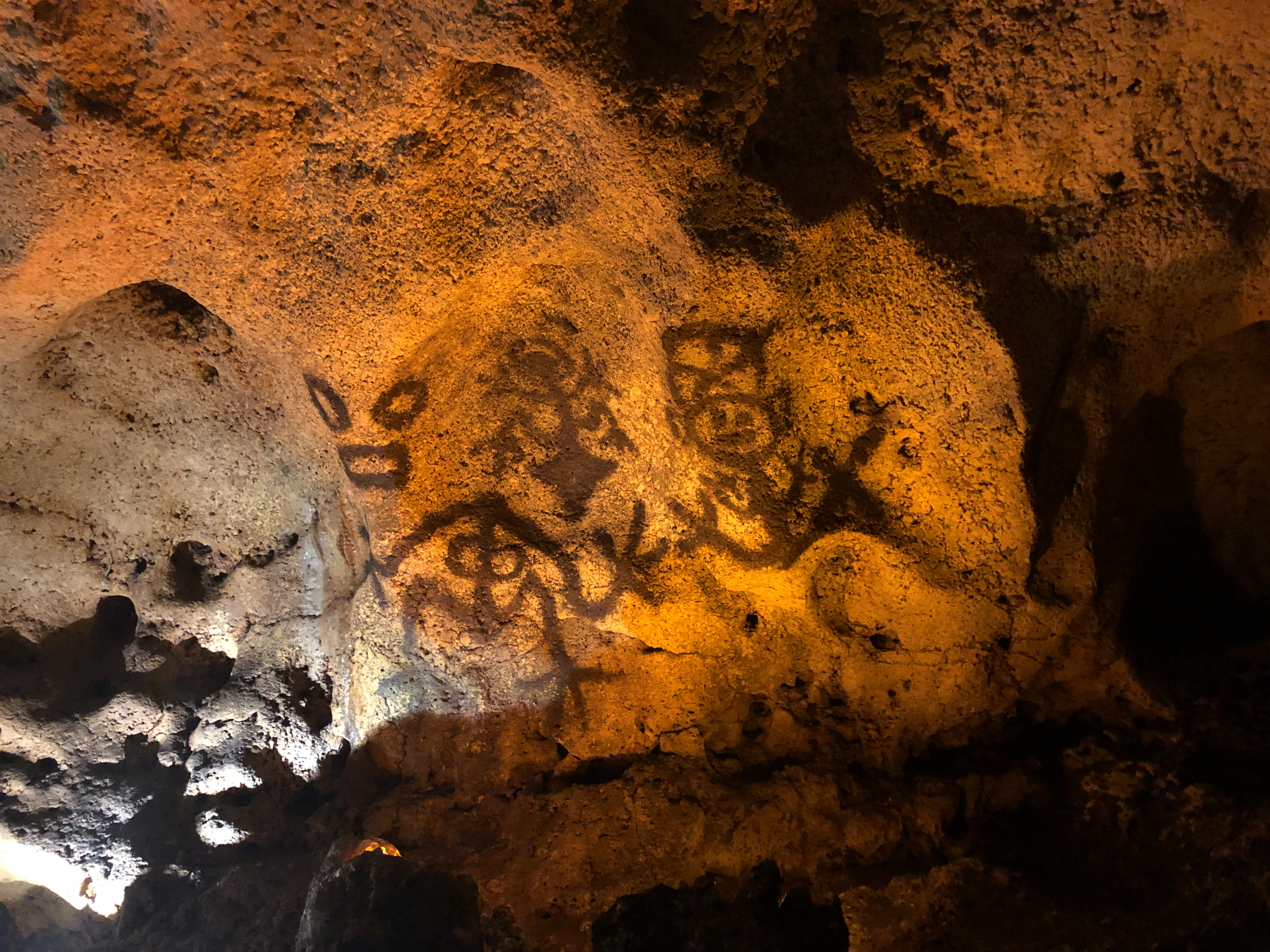
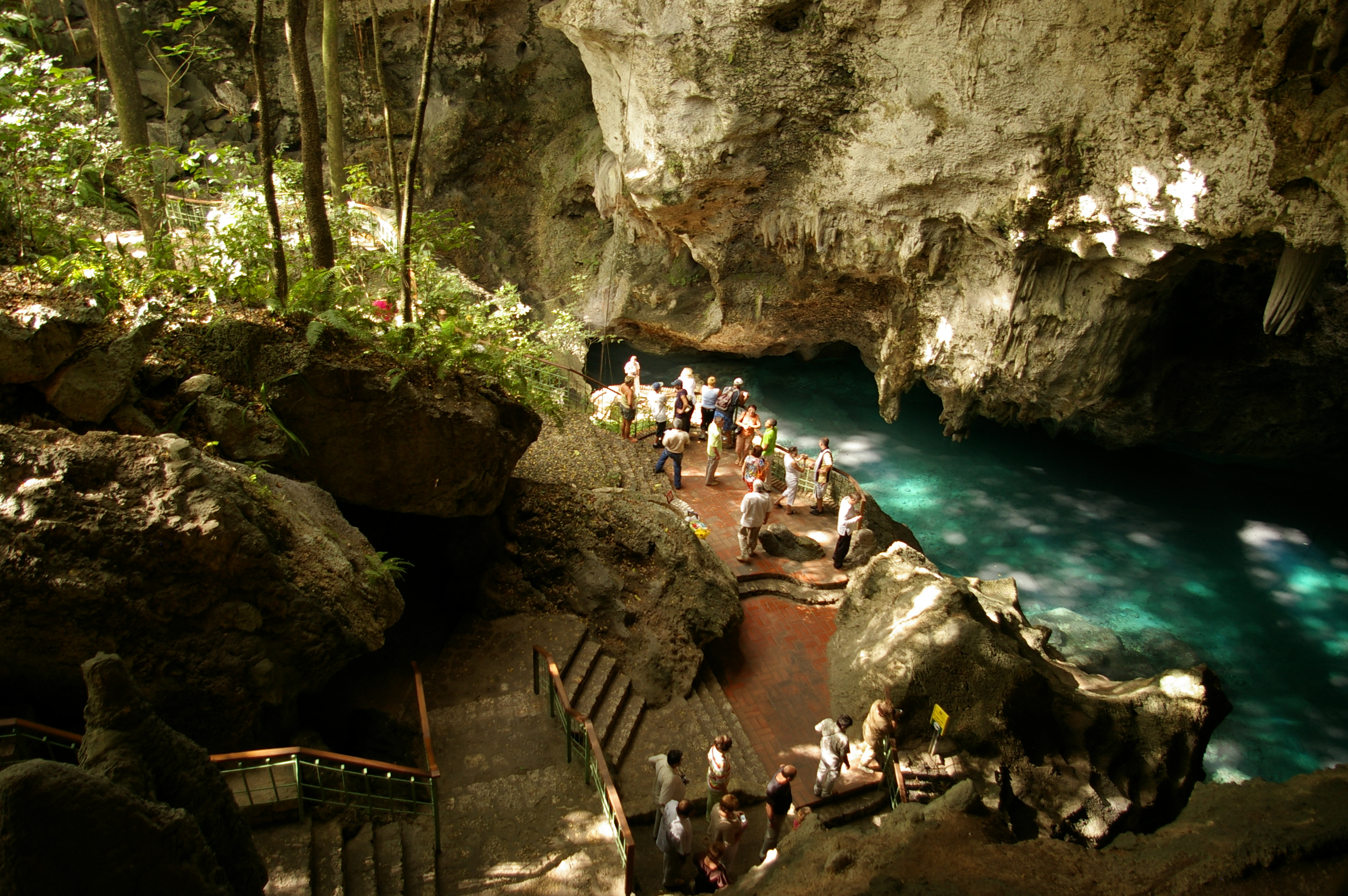
The Pomier Caves are a series of 55 caves located north of San Cristóbal. They contain the largest collection of 2,000-year-old rock art in the Caribbean

The islands of the Caribbean were first settled around 6,000 years ago by hunter-gatherer peoples originating from Central America or northern South America. The Arawakan-speaking ancestors of the Taíno moved into the Caribbean from South America during the 1st millennium BCE, reaching Hispaniola by around 600 CE. These Arawakan peoples engaged in farming, fishing, hunting and gathering, and the widespread production of ceramic goods.

The estimates of Hispaniola's population in 1492 vary widely, ranging from tens of thousands to 2 million.

By 1492, the island was divided into five Taíno chiefdoms. The Taíno name for the entire island was either Ayiti or Quisqueya.

=== European colonization ===
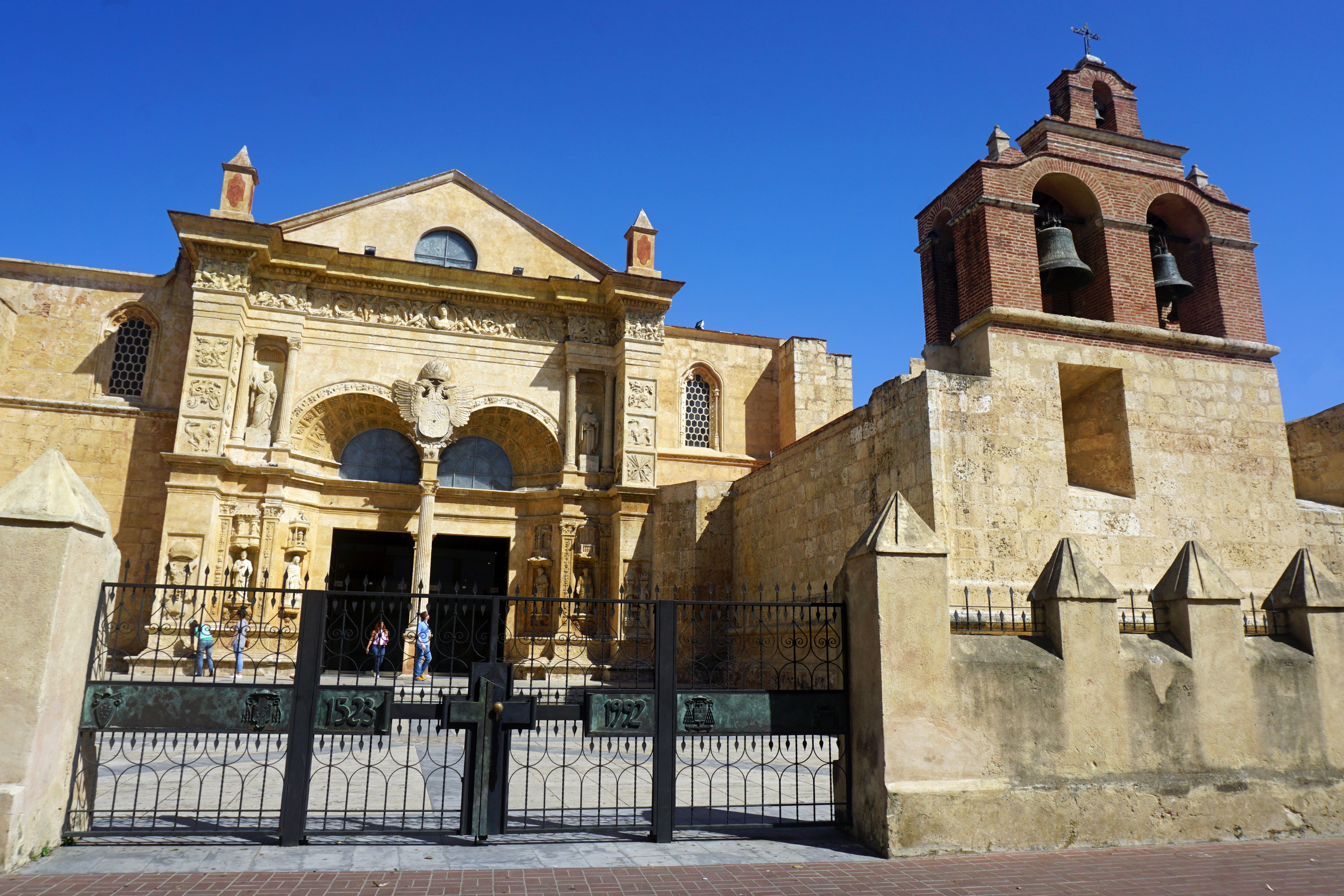
Catedral Santa María La Menor is the oldest cathedral built in the Americas

Christopher Columbus arrived on the island on December 5, 1492, during the first of his four voyages to the Americas. He claimed the land for the Crown of Castile and named it La Española, due to its diverse climate and terrain, which reminded him of the Spanish landscape. In 1496, Bartholomew Columbus, Christopher's brother, built the city of Santo Domingo, Western Europe's first permanent settlement in the "New World". The Spaniards created a plantation economy.

Initially, after friendly relationships, the Taínos resisted the conquest, led by female Chief Anacaona of Xaragua and her ex-husband Chief Caonabo of Maguana, as well as Chiefs Guacanagaríx, Guamá, Hatuey, and Enriquillo. The latter's successes gained his people an autonomous enclave on the island. Within a few years after 1492, the population of Taínos had declined drastically due to smallpox, measles, and other diseases that arrived with the Europeans. African slaves were imported to replace the dwindling Taínos.

The last record of pure Taínos in the country was from 1864. Still, Taíno biological heritage survived due to intermixing. Census records from 1514 reveal that 40% of Spanish men in Santo Domingo were married to Taíno women, and some present-day Dominicans have Taíno ancestry.

Map showing the border situation on Hispaniola following the Treaty of Aranjuez (1777)

By the time of the Treaty of Ryswick in 1697, which ceded the western one-third of the island to France, the population of Santo Domingo consisted of a few thousand whites, approximately 30,000 black slaves, and a few Taínos. By 1789, the population had grown to 125,000, but Santo Domingo remained one of Spain's less wealthy and strategically important colonies in the New World. The population composition of Santo Domingo sharply contrasted with that of the neighboring French colony of Saint-Domingue—the wealthiest colony in the Caribbean and whose population of half a million was 90% enslaved and four times as numerous as Santo Domingo.

In 1795, Spain ceded Santo Domingo to France by the Treaty of Basel as a result of its defeat in the War of the Pyrenees. Saint-Domingue achieved independence as Haiti from France on January 1, 1804. In 1809, with the outbreak of the Peninsular War, the French were expelled from the island and Santo Domingo returned to Spanish rule.

=== Ephemeral independence and Haitian occupation (1821–1844) ===
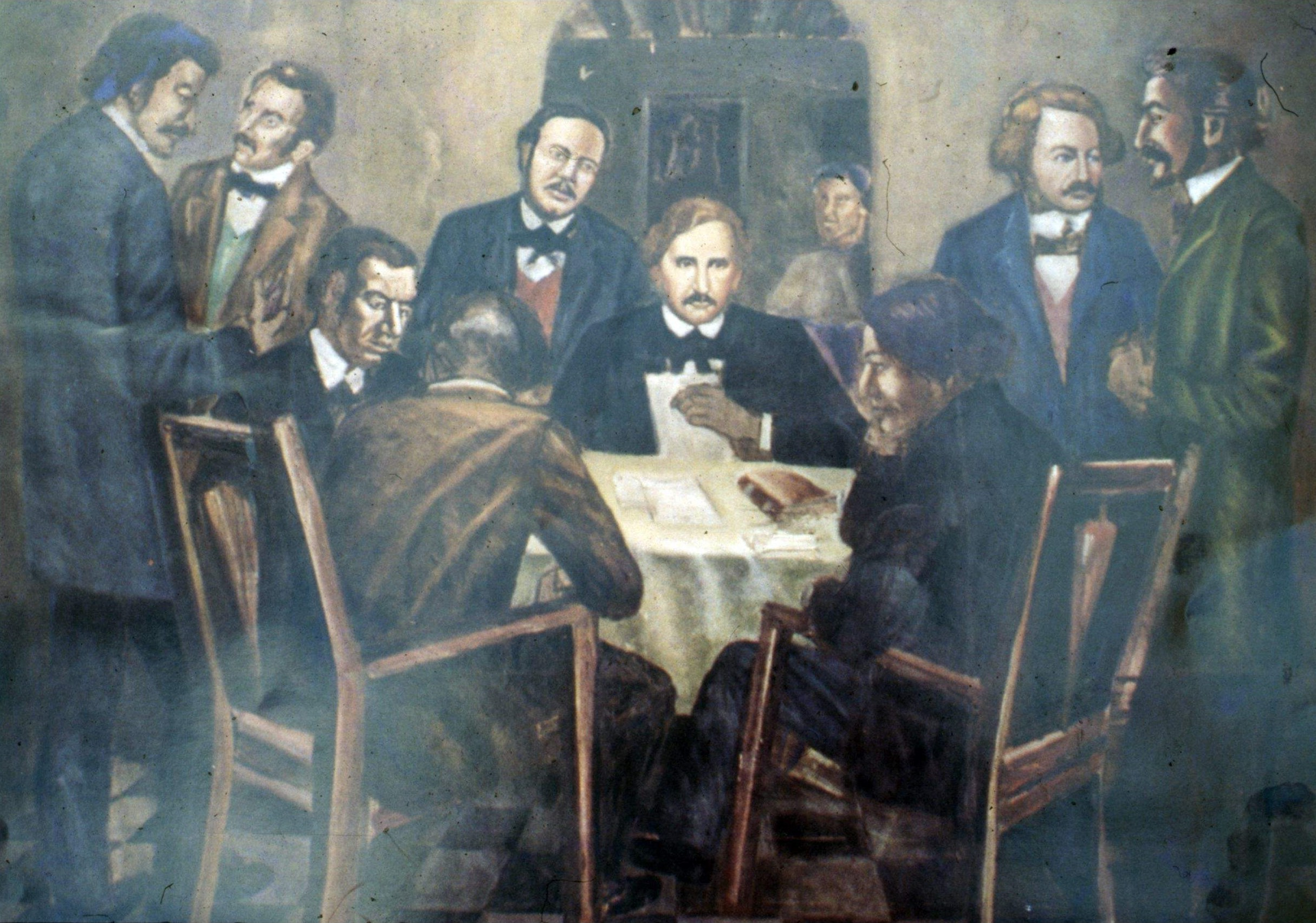
In 1838, Juan Pablo Duarte and others established a secret patriotic society called La Trinitaria, which helped undermine Haitian occupation.

After a dozen years of discontent and failed independence plots by various opposing groups, Santo Domingo's former Lieutenant-Governor (top administrator), José Núñez de Cáceres, declared the colony's independence from the Spanish crown as Spanish Haiti on November 30, 1821. This period is also known as the Ephemeral independence.

The newly independent republic ended two months later, when it was occupied and annexed by Haiti, then under the leadership of Jean-Pierre Boyer. For twenty-two years, Haiti controlled Santo Domingo, which it called Partie de l'Est, treating it as a colonial territory. The unpaid Haitian army sustained itself by taking resources from the Dominican people and land without compensation, and the highest administrative positions were reserved for Haitian mulattoes.

=== First Republic (1844–1861) ===
Original flag of the Dominican Republic (up to 1849)

In 1838, Juan Pablo Duarte founded a secret society called La Trinitaria, which sought the complete independence of Santo Domingo without any foreign intervention. Also Francisco del Rosario Sánchez and Ramon Matias Mella, despite not being among the founding members of La Trinitaria, were decisive in the fight for independence. Duarte, Mella, and Sánchez are considered the Founding Fathers of the Dominican Republic.

On February 27, 1844, the members of La Trinitaria declared independence from Haiti. They were backed by Pedro Santana, a wealthy cattle rancher, who became general of the army of the nascent republic. The decades that followed were filled with tyranny, factionalism, economic difficulties, rapid changes of government, and exile for political opponents. Archrivals Santana and Buenaventura Báez held power most of the time, both ruling arbitrarily. They promoted competing plans to annex the new nation to a major power. The Dominican Republic's first constitution was adopted on November 6, 1844, and its population in 1845 was approximately 230,000 people (100,000 whites; 40,000 blacks; and 90,000 mulattoes).

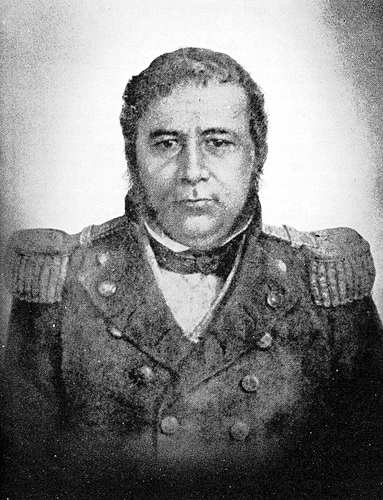
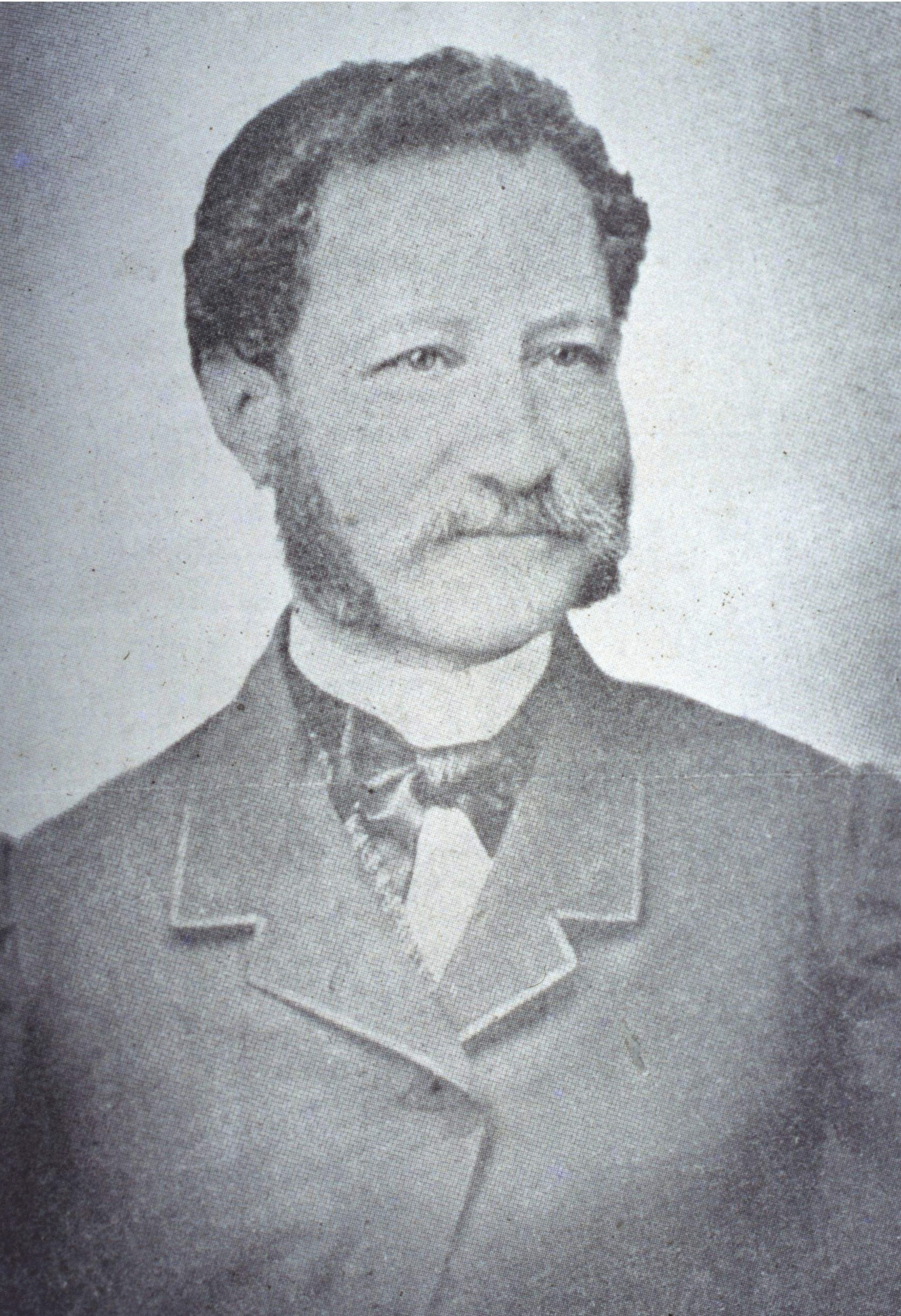
Pedro Santana and Buenaventura Báez, the caudillos who led the Dominican Republic during its first republican period

In March 1844, Haiti invaded but the Dominicans put up stiff opposition and inflicted heavy casualties on the Haitians. By April 15, Dominican forces had defeated the Haitian forces on both land and sea. In early July 1844, Duarte was urged by his followers to take the title of President of the Republic. Duarte agreed, but only if free elections were arranged. However, Santana's forces took Santo Domingo on July 12, and they declared Santana ruler of the Dominican Republic. Santana then put Mella, Duarte, and Sánchez in jail. On February 27, 1845, Santana executed María Trinidad Sánchez, heroine of La Trinitaria, and others for conspiracy.

After defeating a Haitian invasion in April 1849 at the Battle of Las Carreras, Santana marched on Santo Domingo and deposed President Manuel Jimenes in a coup d'état. At his behest, Congress elected Buenaventura Báez as president, but Báez was unwilling to serve as Santana's puppet. In November–December 1849, Dominican seamen raided the Haitian coasts, plundered seaside villages, as far as Dame-Marie on the Tiburon Peninsula, and butchered crews of captured enemy ships. A fourth and final invasion by Haiti in November 1855 was defeated by Dominican forces by January 27, 1856, resulting in thousands of Haitian casualties. Santana and Báez competed for political dominance, with Báez prevailing in 1857 and expelling Santana, and Santana returning to power in 1859 and expelling Báez.

=== Restoration Republic (1865–1899) ===
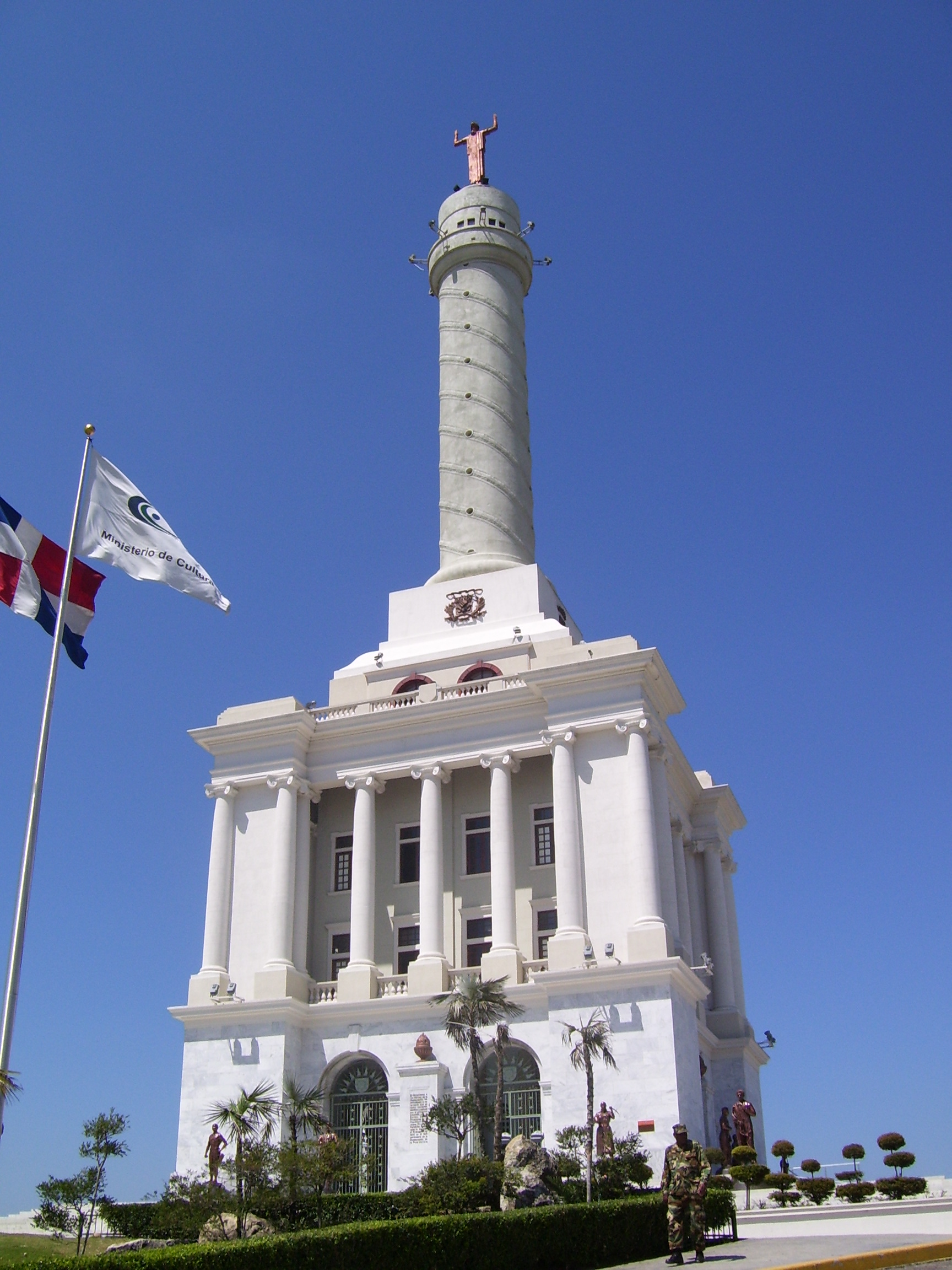
Monument built by Dominicans in 1944, commemorating the participants of the War of Restoration

In 1861, after imprisoning, exiling, and executing many of his opponents and due to political and economic reasons, Santana asked Queen Isabella II of Spain to retake control of the Dominican Republic. Spain, which had not come to terms with the loss of its mainland American colonies 40 years earlier, annexed the country. The island was occupied by 30,000 Spanish troops bolstered by battalions of Cuban and Puerto Rican volunteers and 12,000 Dominicans who aligned themselves with the Spanish forces. The Haitian rebel Sylvain Salnave, fearful of the reestablishment of Spain as colonial power, gave refuge and logistics to revolutionaries seeking to reestablish the independent nation. The ensuing civil war, known as the War of Restoration, killed more than 50,000.

The war began on August 16, 1863. After nearly two years of fighting, Spain abandoned the island in July 1865. (Note: One military historian estimates Spanish casualties at 10,888 killed or wounded in action and thousands of yellow fever deaths, along with 10,000 casualties among Dominicans fighting for Spain, while another estimates 18,000 Spanish dead, not including Dominicans, Cubans, and Puerto Ricans fighting alongside them. Dominican independence forces suffered more than 4,000 dead. Among Spanish casualties were future general Fernando Primo de Rivera, who was wounded, and black general Juan Suero, who was killed by Dominican forces.) Political strife again prevailed in the following years; warlords ruled, military revolts were extremely common, and the nation amassed debt. It was now Báez's turn to act on his plan of annexing the country to the United States, where two successive presidents were supportive. U.S. President Ulysses S. Grant desired a naval base at Samaná and also a place for resettling newly freed African Americans. The treaty was defeated in the United States Senate in 1870. Báez was toppled in 1874, returned, and was toppled for good in 1878.

Relative peace came to the country in the 1880s, which saw the coming to power of General Ulises Heureaux. "Lilís", as the new president was nicknamed, put the nation deep into debt while using much of the proceeds for his personal use and to maintain his police state. In 1899, he was assassinated. However, the relative calm over which he presided allowed improvement in the Dominican economy. The sugar industry was modernized, and the country attracted foreign workers and immigrants. Lebanese, Syrians, and Palestinians from the Ottoman Empire began to arrive in the country during the latter part of the 19th century. They were referred to locally as "Turks" because they were Ottoman subjects and carried Ottoman passports. During the U.S. occupation of 1916–24, Dominican peasants would not only kill U.S. Marines, but would also attack and kill Arab vendors traveling through the countryside.

=== 20th century (1900–1930) ===
From 1902 on, short-lived governments were again the norm, with their power usurped by caudillos in parts of the country. Furthermore, the national government was bankrupt and, unable to pay its debts to European creditors, faced the threat of military intervention by France, Germany, and Italy. Dominican debt had grown to $32 million, an amount that could not be serviced by national revenues. United States President Theodore Roosevelt sought to prevent European intervention, largely to protect the routes to the future Panama Canal. He made a small military intervention to ward off European powers, to proclaim his famous Roosevelt Corollary to the Monroe Doctrine, and also to obtain his 1905 Dominican agreement for U.S. administration of Dominican customs, which was the chief source of income for the Dominican government. A 1906 agreement provided for the arrangement to last 50 years. The United States agreed to use part of the customs proceeds to reduce the immense foreign debt of the Dominican Republic and assumed responsibility for said debt.

After six years in power, President Ramón Cáceres (who had himself assassinated Heureaux) was assassinated in 1911. The result was several years of great political instability and civil war. U.S. mediation by the William Howard Taft and Woodrow Wilson administrations achieved only a short respite each time. General José Bordas Valdez became president on April 14, 1913. A revolt began immediately but subsided after he promised free elections. When his term expired on April 13, 1914, a new revolution broke out and spread nationwide. Positioned above the port town of Puerto Plata with about 600 troops brought by two cruisers, Bordas faced well-entrenched insurgents, leading to considerable fighting and casualties on both sides. The USS Machias prevented the Dominican cruisers from bombarding the town and later fired near the railroad station, after which conventional fighting ceased.

A political deadlock in August 1914 was broken after an ultimatum by Wilson telling the Dominicans to choose a president or see the U.S. impose one. A provisional president was chosen, and later the same year relatively free elections put former president (1899–1902) Juan Isidro Jimenes Pereyra back in power. With his former Secretary of War Desiderio Arias maneuvering to depose him and despite a U.S. offer of military aid against Arias, Jimenes resigned on May 7, 1916. Wilson thus ordered the U.S. occupation of the Dominican Republic.

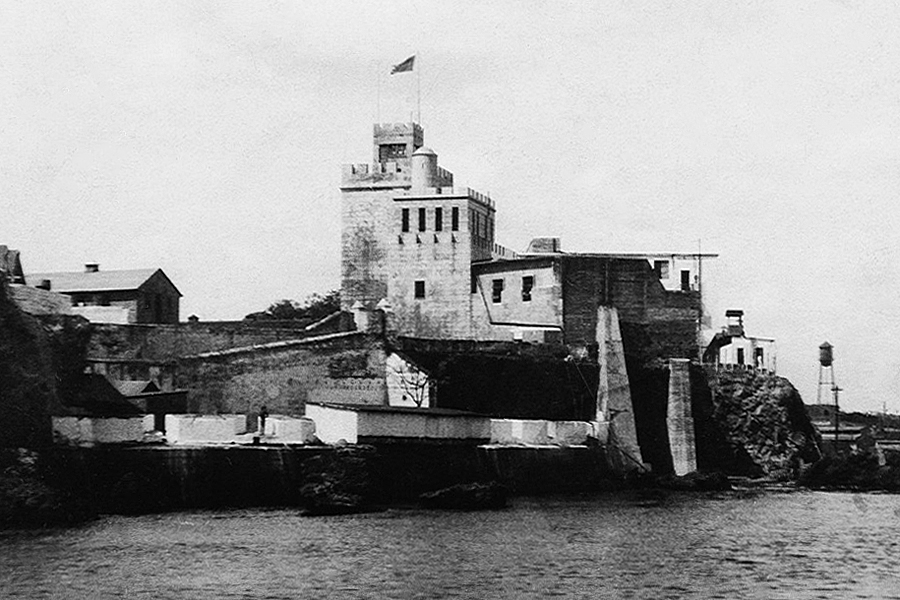
The flag of the United States waving over Ozama Fortress during the U.S. occupation of the Dominican Republic, c. 1922

U.S. Marines landed on May 16, 1916, and seized the capital and other ports, while General Arias fell back to his inland Santiago stronghold. Fort San Felipe in Puerto Plata was captured on June 1 after a battle against Dominicans. A significant weaponry disparity led to Arias's defeat as his forces tried to block the Marines' advance on Santiago with trenches and old black-powder rifles. The clashes marked the first time Dominicans had ever encountered a machine gun. A peace delegation from Santiago surrendered the city on July 5, coinciding with General Arias' surrender to the Dominican governor. The military government established by the U.S. under the Navy and Marine Corps on November 29, led by Vice Admiral Harry Shepard Knapp, was widely repudiated by the Dominicans, but organized resistance ceased. Rear Admiral Thomas Snowden relieved Rear Admiral Knapp as military governor of the Dominican Republic on February 25, 1919.

The occupation regime kept most Dominican laws and institutions and largely pacified the general population. The occupying government also revived the Dominican economy, reduced the nation's debt, built a road network that at last interconnected all regions of the country, and created a professional National Guard to replace the warring partisan units. Additionally, with grass-roots support from local communities and assistance from both Dominican and US officials, the Dominican education system expanded significantly during US occupation. Between 1918 and 1920, more than three hundred schools were established nationwide. The system of forced labour used by the Marines in Haiti was largely absent in the Dominican Republic.

The U.S. government's rule ended in October 1922, and elections were held in March 1924. The victor was former president (1902–03) Horacio Vásquez. He was inaugurated on July 13, 1924, and the last U.S. forces left in September. In 1930, General Rafael Trujillo, who was trained by the U.S. Marines during the occupation, seized power following a military revolt against the government of Vásquez.

Trujillo consolidated his power after Hurricane San Zenón devastated Santo Domingo in September 1930, killing 8,000 people. A few of the former caudillos initially opposed the new dictator. General Cipriano Bencosme led an uprising but was defeated and killed in November 1930 during a confrontation with the army near Puerto Plata. General Desiderio Arias was also unsuccessful, dying in combat near Mao in June of the following year.

=== Trujillo Era (1930–1961) ===
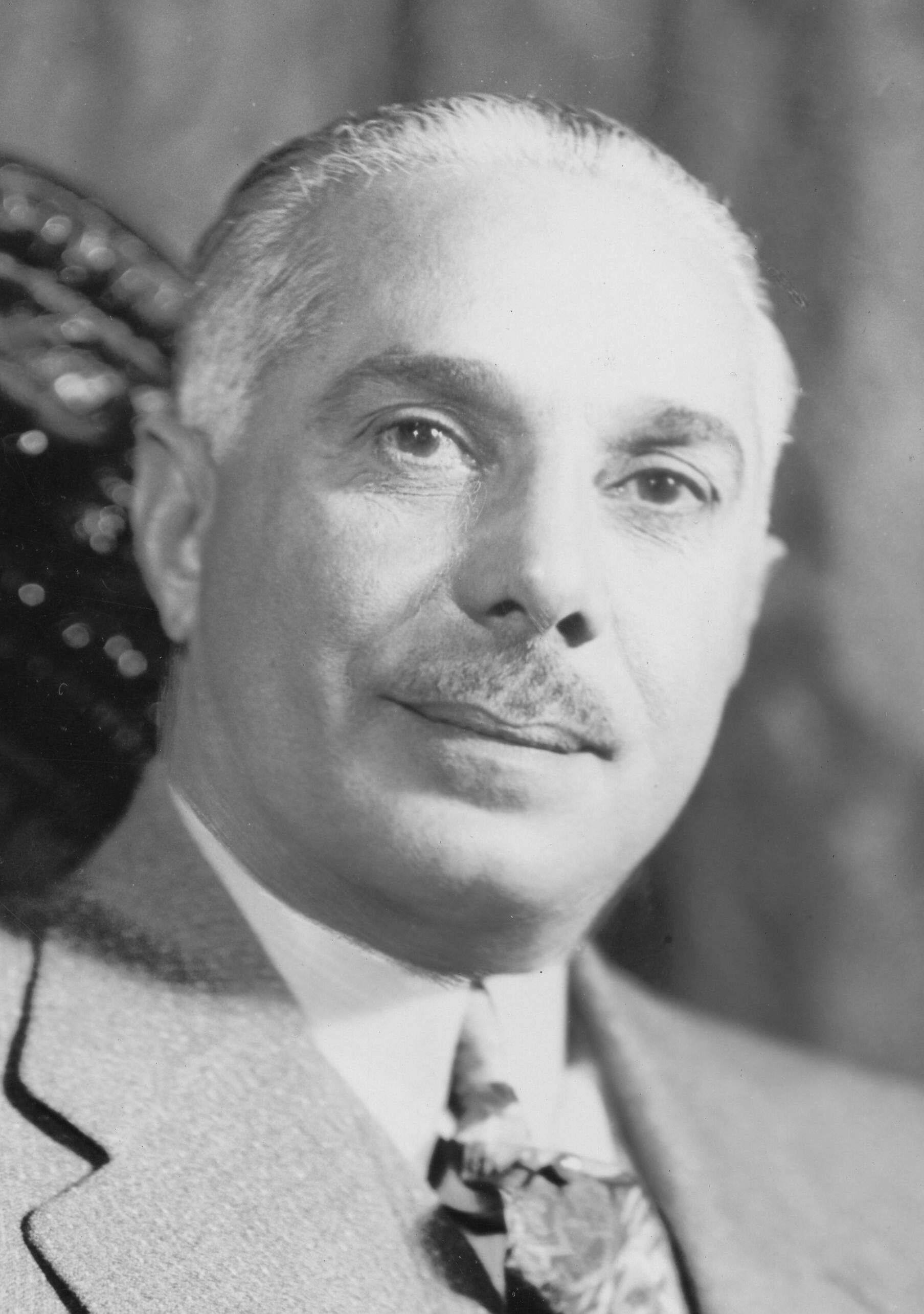
Rafael Trujillo imposed a dictatorship of 31 years (1930–1961)

There was considerable economic growth during Rafael Trujillo's long and iron-fisted regime, although a great deal of the wealth was taken by the dictator and other regime elements. There was progress in healthcare, education, and transportation, with the building of hospitals, clinics, schools, roads, and harbors. Trujillo also carried out an important housing construction program and instituted a pension plan. He finally negotiated an undisputed border with Haiti in 1935, and achieved the end of the 50-year customs agreement in 1941, well before it would have expired in 1956. He made the country debt-free in 1947. This was accompanied most noticeably by absolute repression and the copious use of murder, torture, and terrorist methods against the opposition.

Starting in 1935, several Dominicans were assassinated in New York City after taking part in anti-Trujillo activities. In early October 1937, under Trujillo's orders, Dominican troops killed between 15,000 and 35,000 Haitian men, women, and children in the border region.

During World War II, Trujillo symbolically sided with the Allies. During the Battle of the Caribbean in 1942, German U-boats torpedoed and sank two Dominican-flagged merchant vessels—the San Rafael off the coast of Jamaica and the Presidente Trujillo off Fort-de-France—along with four other Dominican-manned ships in the Caribbean. The country did not contribute militarily, but its sugar and other agricultural products supported the Allied war effort.

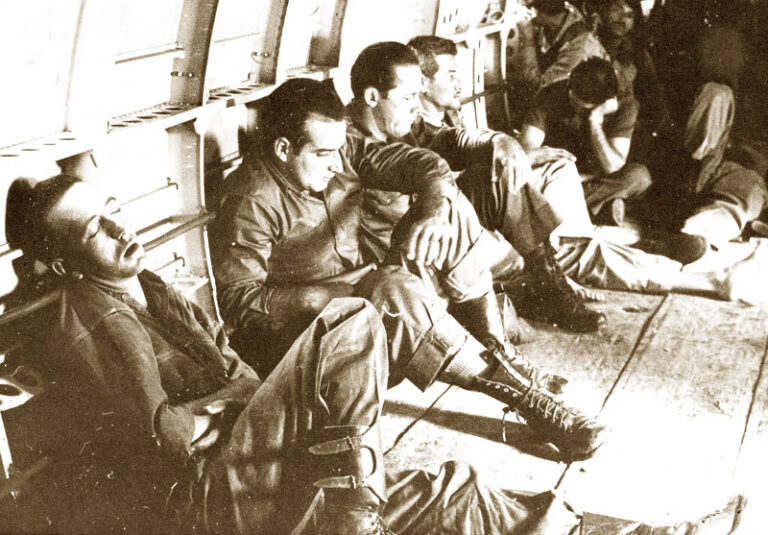
Captured members of Trujillo's Anti-Communist Legion in Trinidad, Cuba, August 13, 1959

Under Trujillo, a weapons factory at San Cristóbal produced rifles, machine guns, and ammunition. Trujillo also formed a right-wing Foreign Legion of 3,000 mercenaries to attempt to overthrow Fidel Castro in Cuba. Major William Morgan, acting as a double agent for Castro, pretended to lead the operation for Trujillo but secretly informed Castro of the plot. On August 13, 1959, a C-47 transport flying from the Dominican Republic carrying military advisors and supplies landed at Trinidad airport, where Castro seized the aircraft and its ten occupants; an exchange of gunfire left two of the advisors and three Cuban forces dead, and around 4,000 suspects were arrested throughout Cuba. Earlier in June, Cuban soldiers and Cuban-trained Dominican guerrillas attempted an unsuccessful invasion of the Dominican Republic.

In 1956, Trujillo's agents kidnapped Columbia University lecturer Jesús Galíndez in New York and had him flown to the Dominican Republic, where he was apparently murdered. The case drew attention in the United States and contributed to growing criticism of the regime.

On November 25, 1960, Trujillo's henchmen killed three of the four Mirabal sisters, nicknamed Las Mariposas (The Butterflies). Along with their husbands, the sisters were conspiring to overthrow Trujillo in a violent revolt. The International Day for the Elimination of Violence against Women is observed on the anniversary of their deaths.

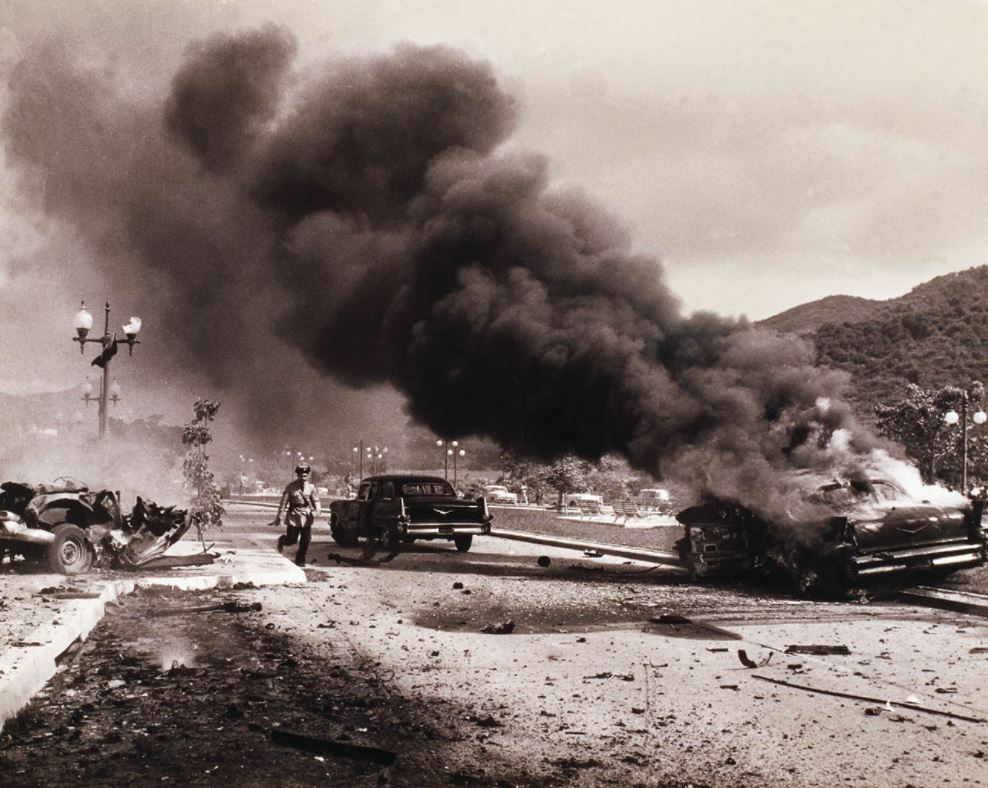
Aftermath of the June 24, 1960, assassination attempt

For a long time, the U.S. and the Dominican elite supported the Trujillo government. This support persisted despite the assassinations of political opposition, the massacre of Haitians, and Trujillo's plots against other countries. The U.S. finally broke with Trujillo in 1960, after Trujillo's intelligence chief Johnny Abbes orchestrated an attempt to assassinate the Venezuelan president Rómulo Betancourt with a car bomb. During Betancourt's earlier exile in Cuba, Trujillo's agents attempted to inject poison into him on a Havana street in broad daylight.

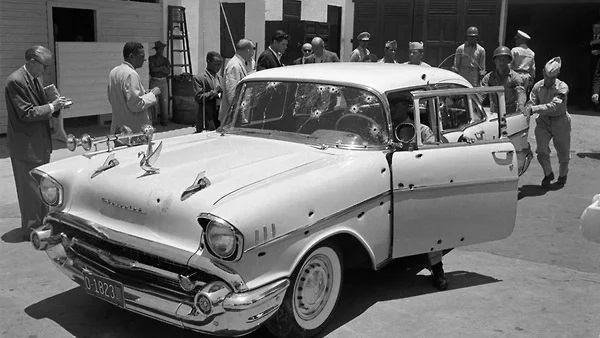
Trujillo's car following the May 30, 1961, assassination

After its representatives confirmed Trujillo's complicity in the nearly successful assassination attempt, the Organization of American States (OAS), for the first time in its history, decreed sanctions against a member state. The OAS voted unanimously to condemn the Dominican Republic for its aggression and imposed an arms embargo. The United States severed diplomatic relations with the Dominican Republic on August 26, 1960, and in January 1961 suspended the export of trucks, parts, crude oil, gasoline and other petroleum products. U.S. President Dwight D. Eisenhower also took advantage of OAS sanctions to drastically cut purchases of Dominican sugar, the country's major export. This action ultimately cost the Dominican Republic almost $22,000,000 in lost revenues at a time when its economy was in a rapid decline. Trujillo had become expendable, and dissidents inside the Dominican Republic argued that assassination was the only certain way to remove him.

On May 30, 1961, Trujillo was shot and killed by Dominican dissidents during a car chase.

On May 31, 1961, the following day, Venezuela arrested several individuals plotting to overthrow the government, armed with weapons traced to the Dominican Republic.

=== Post-Trujillo (1961–1996) ===
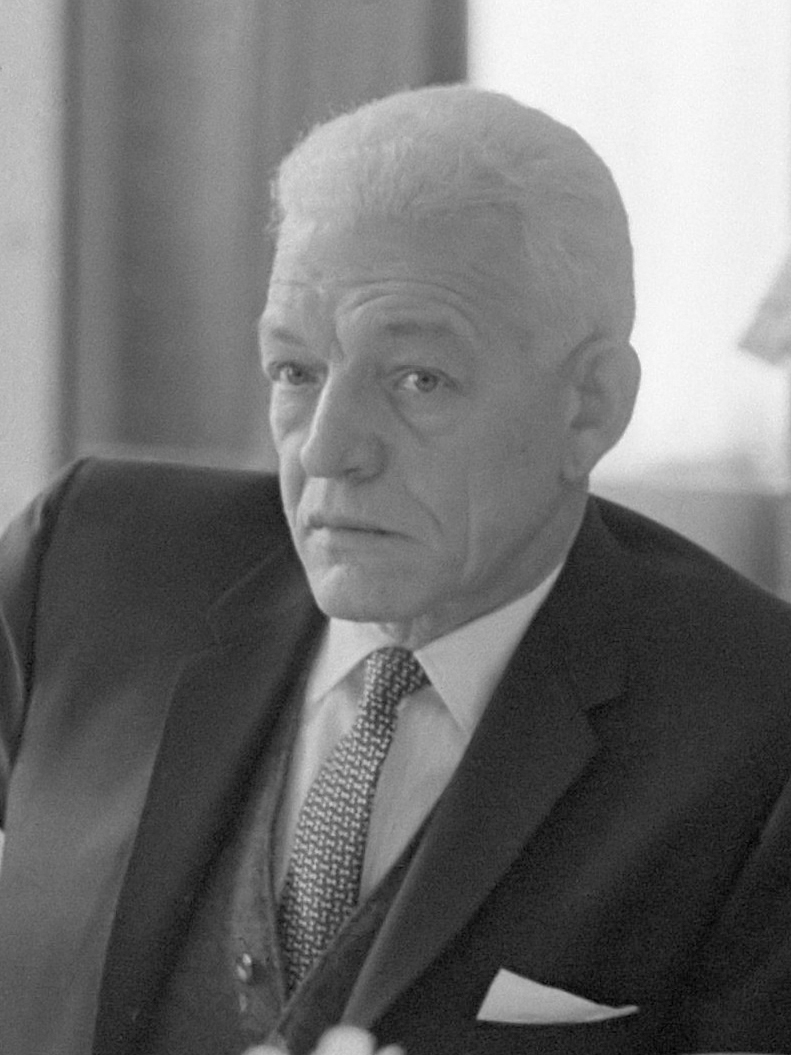
Juan Bosch, the first democratically elected president after Trujillo

After the assassination, Ramfis Trujillo, the dictator's son, remained in de facto control of the government for the next 6 months, as commander of the armed forces. Trujillo's brothers, Hector Bienvenido and Jose Arismendi Trujillo, returned to the country and plotted against President Balaguer. On November 18, 1961, as a planned coup became more evident, U.S. Secretary of State Dean Rusk issued a warning that the US would not "remain idle" if the Trujillos attempted to "reassert dictatorial domination". Following this warning, and the arrival of a 14-vessel U.S. naval task force within sight of Santo Domingo, Ramfis and his uncles fled the country on November 19. The OAS lifted its sanctions on January 4, 1962.

In February 1963, a democratically elected government under leftist Juan Bosch took office but it was overthrown by a military coup on 25 September. On April 24, 1965, a second military coup ousted the military-installed president Donald Reid Cabral. Despite tank assaults, strafing, aerial bombardment, and rocket attacks by junta forces, pro-Bosch Constitutionalists maintained control of most of the capital, where electricity, water, and food supplies collapsed amid the fighting. By April 26, around 5,000 armed civilians had joined the 1,500 rebel military regulars. The total strength of the junta was eight F-51 fighters, eight Vampire jets, a company of 23 tanks, and two infantry battalions totaling 1,700 troops.

On April 28, U.S. President Lyndon B. Johnson deployed Marines from Guantanamo Bay Naval Base to Santo Domingo to protect American citizens and support the military junta that had ousted Bosch in the 1963 coup, with U.S. forces subsequently expanded to 24,000 troops. On April 30, elements of the 82nd Airborne Division, commanded by Robert H. York, landed from C‑124 and C‑130 transports at San Isidro airfield and crossed the Duarte Bridge under the cover of Marine Corps F-4 Phantom jets to link up with junta troops, who were to secure a corridor for the Marines guarding the U.S. Embassy. However, the junta troops withdrew to San Isidro airfield instead. On May 2, U.S. forces were authorized to link up, and the outgunned Constitutionalists retreated to the southeastern part of the city. A ceasefire was declared on May 5. The following day, U.S. diplomats persuaded the OAS to establish an Inter-American Peace Force to support American troops. The following countries volunteered: Brazil (1,250 soldiers), Costa Rica (25 police), Honduras (250 soldiers), Nicaragua (164 soldiers), and Paraguay (286 soldiers).

U.S. and OAS peacekeeping troops remained in the country for over a year and left after supervising elections in 1966 won by Joaquín Balaguer, who had been Trujillo's last puppet-president. Balaguer remained in power as president for 12 years. His tenure was a period of repression of human rights and civil liberties. His rule was criticized for a growing disparity between rich and poor. It was, however, praised for an ambitious infrastructure program, which included construction of large housing projects, sports complexes, theaters, museums, aqueducts, roads, highways, and the massive Columbus Lighthouse, completed in 1992 during a later tenure.

In 1978, Balaguer was succeeded to the presidency by opposition candidate Antonio Guzmán Fernández, of the Dominican Revolutionary Party (PRD). Hurricane David hit the Dominican Republic in August 1979, which left upwards of 2,000 people dead and 200,000 homeless. The hurricane caused over $1 billion in damage. Another PRD win in 1982 followed, under Salvador Jorge Blanco. Balaguer regained the presidency in 1986 and was re-elected in 1990 and 1994, in the latter defeating PRD candidate José Francisco Peña Gómez, a former mayor of Santo Domingo. The 1994 elections were flawed, bringing international pressure, to which Balaguer responded by scheduling another presidential contest in 1996. Balaguer was not a candidate. The PSRC candidate was his Vice President Jacinto Peynado Garrigosa.

=== 1996–present ===
In 1996, with the support of Joaquín Balaguer and the Social Christian Reform Party in a coalition called the Patriotic Front, Leonel Fernández achieved the first-ever win for the Dominican Liberation Party (PLD), which Bosch had founded in 1973 after leaving the PRD. Fernández oversaw a fast-growing economy: growth averaged 7.7% per year, unemployment fell, and exchange and inflation rates were stable.

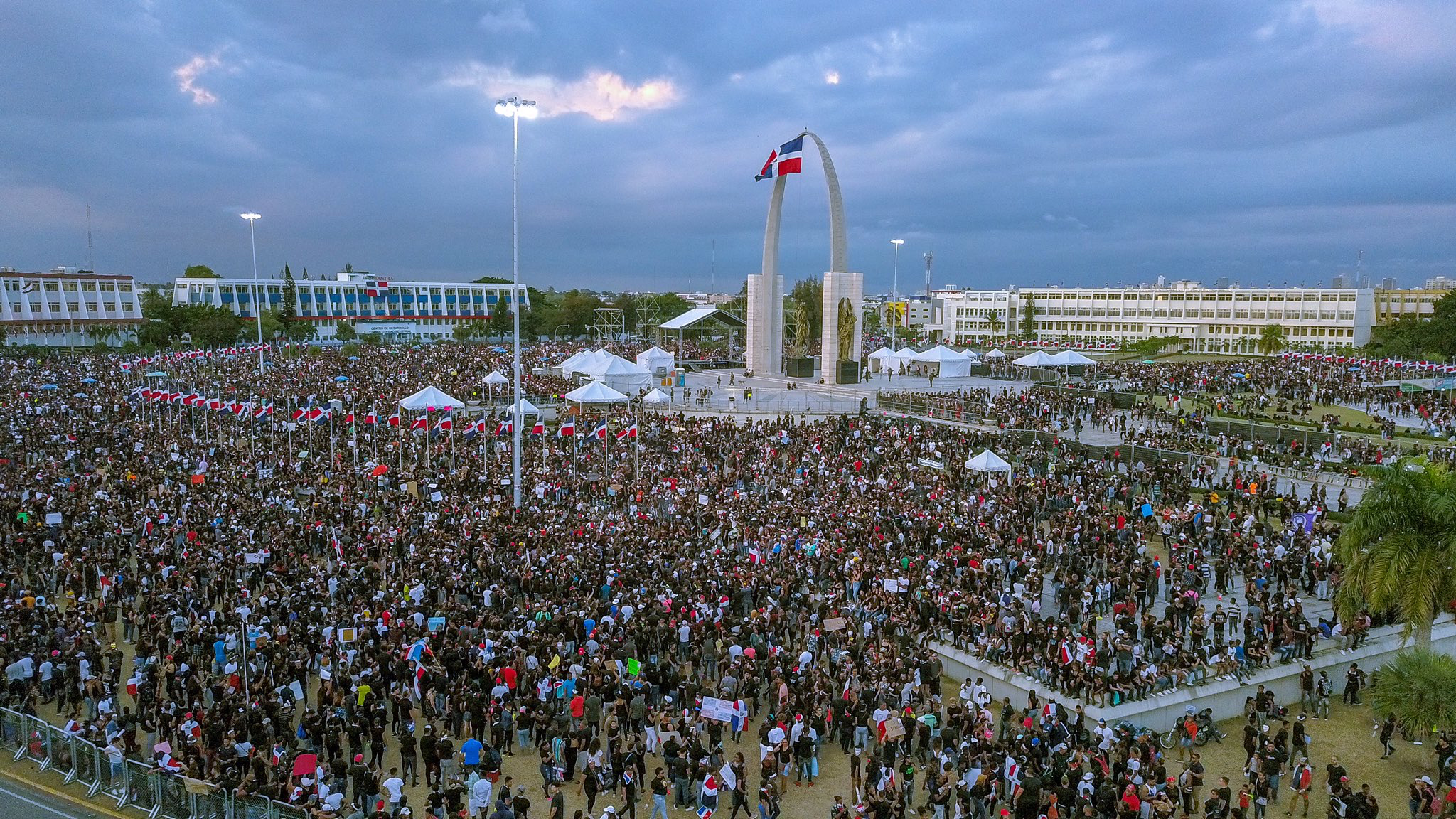
2020 Dominican Republic protests in Plaza de La Bandera, Santo Domingo

In 2000, the PRD's Hipólito Mejía won the election. This was a time of economic troubles. Under Mejía, the Dominican Republic participated in the US-led coalition, as part of the Multinational Plus Ultra Brigade, during the 2003 invasion of Iraq, suffering no casualties. In 2008, Fernández was elected for a third term. Fernández and the PLD are credited with initiatives that moved the country forward technologically. His administrations were accused of corruption.

Danilo Medina of the PLD was elected president in 2012 and re-elected in 2016. A significant increase in crime, government corruption and a weak justice system threatened to overshadow their administrative period. He was succeeded by the opposition candidate Luis Abinader in the 2020 election (weeks after protests erupted in the country against Medina's government), marking the end to 16 years in power of the centre-left Dominican Liberation Party (PLD). In May 2024, President Luis Abinader won a second term in the elections. His tough policies towards migration from neighbouring Haiti was popular among voters.

== Geography ==
Topographical map of Dominican Republic

The Dominican Republic comprises the eastern five-eighths of Hispaniola, the second-largest island in the Greater Antilles, with the Atlantic Ocean to the north and the Caribbean Sea to the south. It shares the island roughly at a 2:1 ratio with Haiti, the north-to-south (though somewhat irregular) border between the two countries being 376 km (234 mi). To the north and north-west lie The Bahamas and the Turks and Caicos Islands, and to the east, across the Mona Passage, the US Commonwealth of Puerto Rico. The country's area is reported variously as 48,442 km^{2} (18,704 sq mi) (by the embassy in the United States) and 48,670 km^{2} (18,792 sq mi), making it the second largest country in the Antilles, after Cuba. The Dominican Republic's capital and largest city Santo Domingo is on the southern coast. A major fault system, the Septentrional fault system, representing the intersection of the North American plate and the Caribbean plate runs through the Dominican Republic.

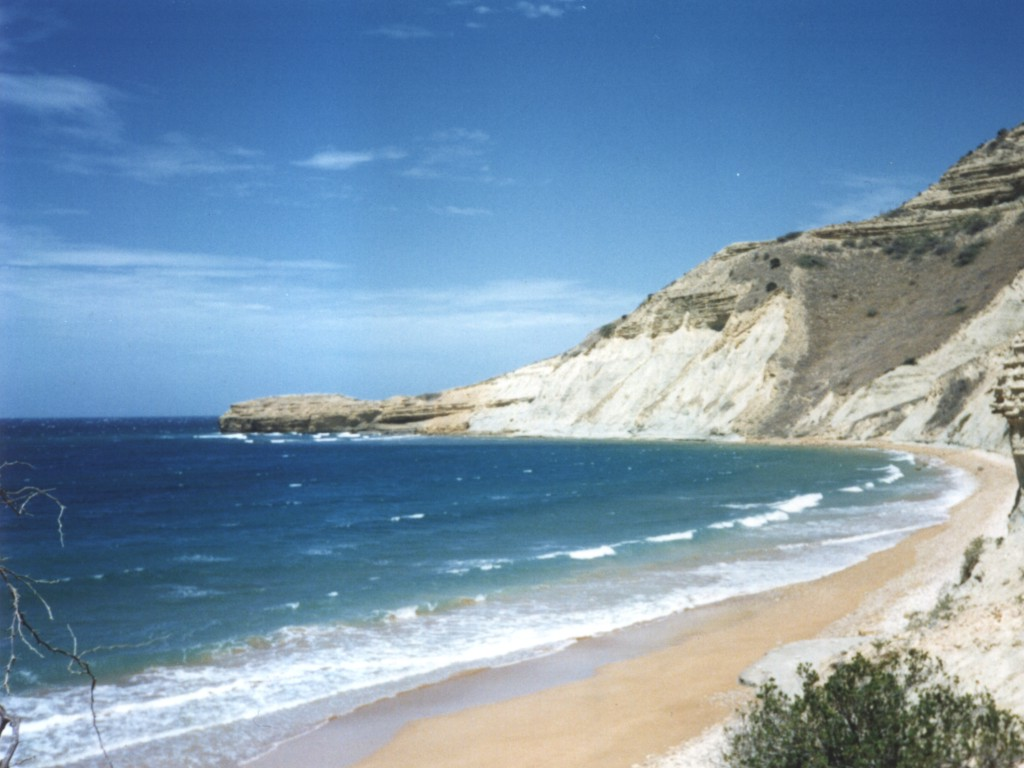
Monte Cristi coastline

The Dominican Republic has four important mountain ranges. The most northerly is the Cordillera Septentrional ("Northern Mountain Range"), which extends from the northwestern coastal town of Monte Cristi, near the Haitian border, to the Samaná Peninsula in the east, running parallel to the Atlantic coast. The highest range in the Dominican Republic – indeed, in the whole of the West Indies – is the Cordillera Central ("Central Mountain Range"). In the Cordillera Central are the four highest peaks in the Caribbean: Pico Duarte (3,098 metres or 10,164 feet above sea level), La Pelona (3,094 metres or 10,151 feet), La Rucilla (3,049 metres or 10,003 feet), and Pico Yaque (2,760 metres or 9,055 feet). In the southwest corner of the country, south of the Cordillera Central, there are two other ranges: the more northerly of the two is the Sierra de Neiba, while in the south the Sierra de Bahoruco is a continuation of the Massif de la Selle in Haiti. There are other, minor mountain ranges, such as the Cordillera Oriental ("Eastern Mountain Range"), Sierra Martín García, Sierra de Yamasá, and Sierra de Samaná.

Between the Central and Northern mountain ranges lies the rich and fertile Cibao valley. This major valley is home to the cities of Santiago de los Caballeros and La Vega and most of the farming areas of the nation. Rather less productive are the semi-arid San Juan Valley, south of the Central Cordillera, and the Neiba Valley, tucked between the Sierra de Neiba and the Sierra de Bahoruco. Much of the land around the Enriquillo Basin is below sea level, with a hot, arid, desert-like environment. There are other smaller valleys in the mountains, such as the Constanza, Jarabacoa, Villa Altagracia, and Bonao valleys. The Llano Costero del Caribe ("Caribbean Coastal Plain") is the largest of the plains in the Dominican Republic. Stretching north and east of Santo Domingo, it contains many sugar plantations in the savannahs that are common there. West of Santo Domingo its width is reduced to 10 kilometres (6.2 mi) as it hugs the coast, finishing at the mouth of the Ocoa River. Another large plain is the Plena de Azua ("Azua Plain"), a very arid region in Azua Province. A few other small coastal plains are on the northern coast and in the Pedernales Peninsula.

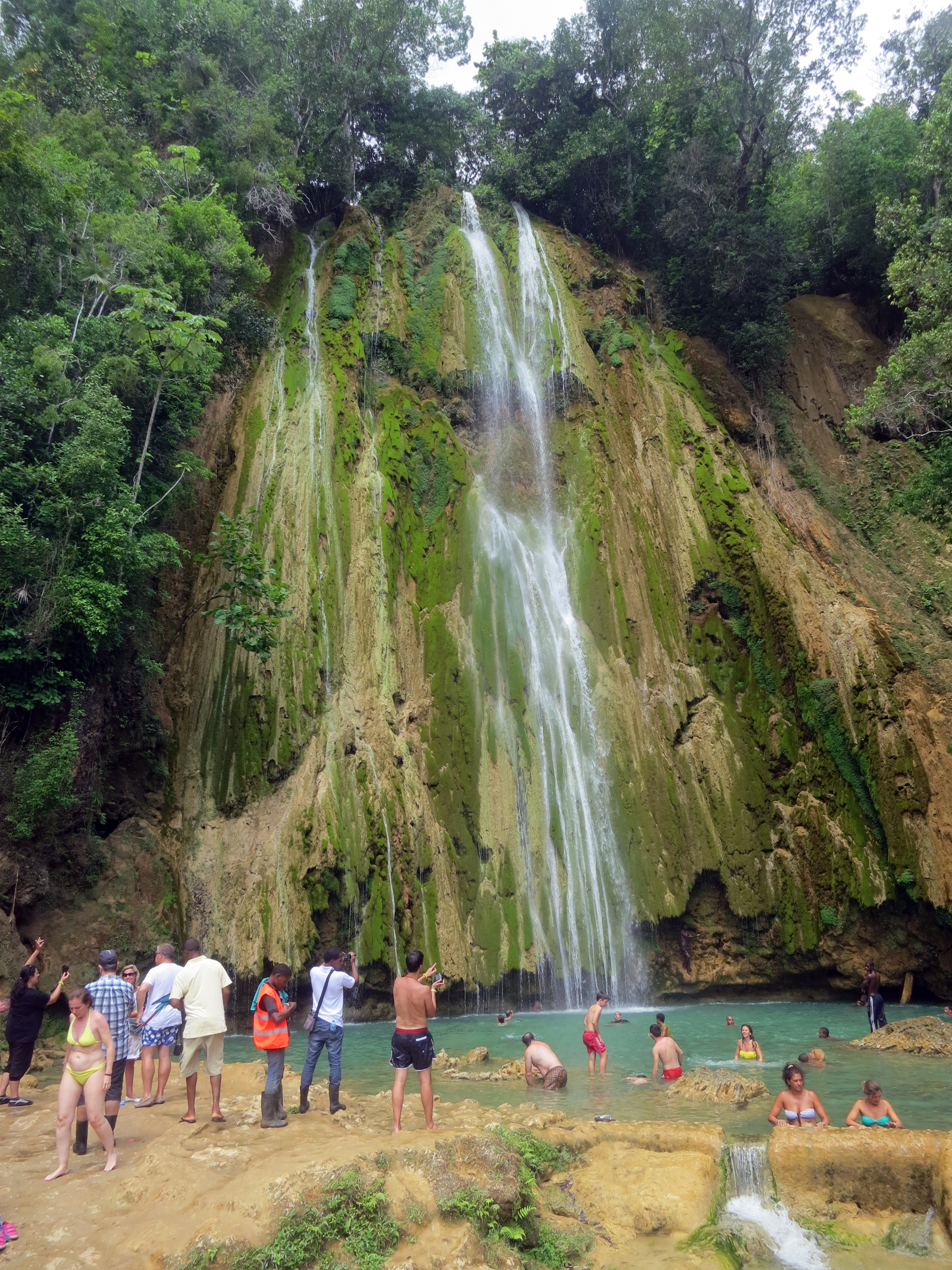
Salto del Limón, one of many waterfalls across the Dominican Republic

Four major rivers drain the numerous mountains of the Dominican Republic. The Yaque del Norte is the longest and most important Dominican river. It carries excess water down from the Cibao Valley and empties into Monte Cristi Bay, in the northwest. Likewise, the Yuna River serves the Vega Real and empties into Samaná Bay, in the northeast. Drainage of the San Juan Valley is provided by the San Juan River, tributary of the Yaque del Sur, which empties into the Caribbean, in the south. The Artibonito is the longest river of Hispaniola and flows westward into Haiti. There are many lakes and coastal lagoons. The largest lake is Enriquillo, a salt lake at 45 metres (148 ft) below sea level, the lowest elevation in the Caribbean.

There are many small offshore islands and cays that form part of the Dominican territory. The two largest islands near shore are Saona, in the southeast, and Beata, in the southwest. Smaller islands include the Cayos Siete Hermanos, Isla Cabra, Cayo Jackson, Cayo Limón, Cayo Levantado, Cayo la Bocaina, Catalanita, Cayo Pisaje and Isla Alto Velo. To the north, at distances of 100–200 kilometres (62–124 mi), are three extensive, largely submerged banks, which geographically are a southeast continuation of the Bahamas: Navidad Bank, Silver Bank, and Mouchoir Bank. Navidad Bank and Silver Bank have been officially claimed by the Dominican Republic. Isla Cabritos lies within Lago Enriquillo.

The country is home to five terrestrial ecoregions: Hispaniolan moist forests, Hispaniolan dry forests, Hispaniolan pine forests, Enriquillo wetlands, and Greater Antilles mangroves.

=== Climate ===
The Dominican Republic has a tropical rainforest climate in the coastal and lowland areas. Some areas, such as most of the Cibao region, have a tropical savanna climate. Due to its diverse topography, Dominican Republic's climate shows considerable variation over short distances and is the most varied of all the Antilles. The annual average temperature is 25 °C (77 °F). At higher elevations the temperature averages 18 °C (64.4 °F) while near sea level the average temperature is 28 °C (82.4 °F). Low temperatures of 0 °C (32 °F) are possible in the mountains while high temperatures of 40 °C (104 °F) are possible in protected valleys. January and February are the coolest months of the year while August is the hottest month. Snowfall can be seen on rare occasions on the summit of Pico Duarte.

The wet season along the northern coast lasts from November through January. Elsewhere the wet season stretches from May through November, with May being the wettest month. Average annual rainfall is 1,500 millimetres (59.1 in) countrywide, with individual locations in the Valle de Neiba seeing averages as low as 350 millimetres (13.8 in) while the Cordillera Oriental averages 2,740 millimetres (107.9 in). The driest part of the country lies in the west.

Tropical cyclones strike the Dominican Republic every couple of years, with 65% of the impacts along the southern coast. Hurricanes are most likely between June and October. The last major hurricane that struck the country was Hurricane Georges in 1998.

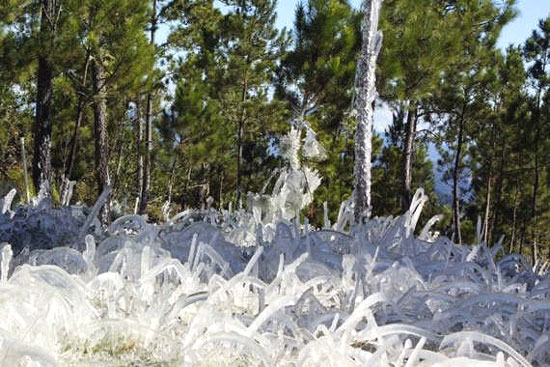
Frosted alpine forest in Constanza, Dominican Republic

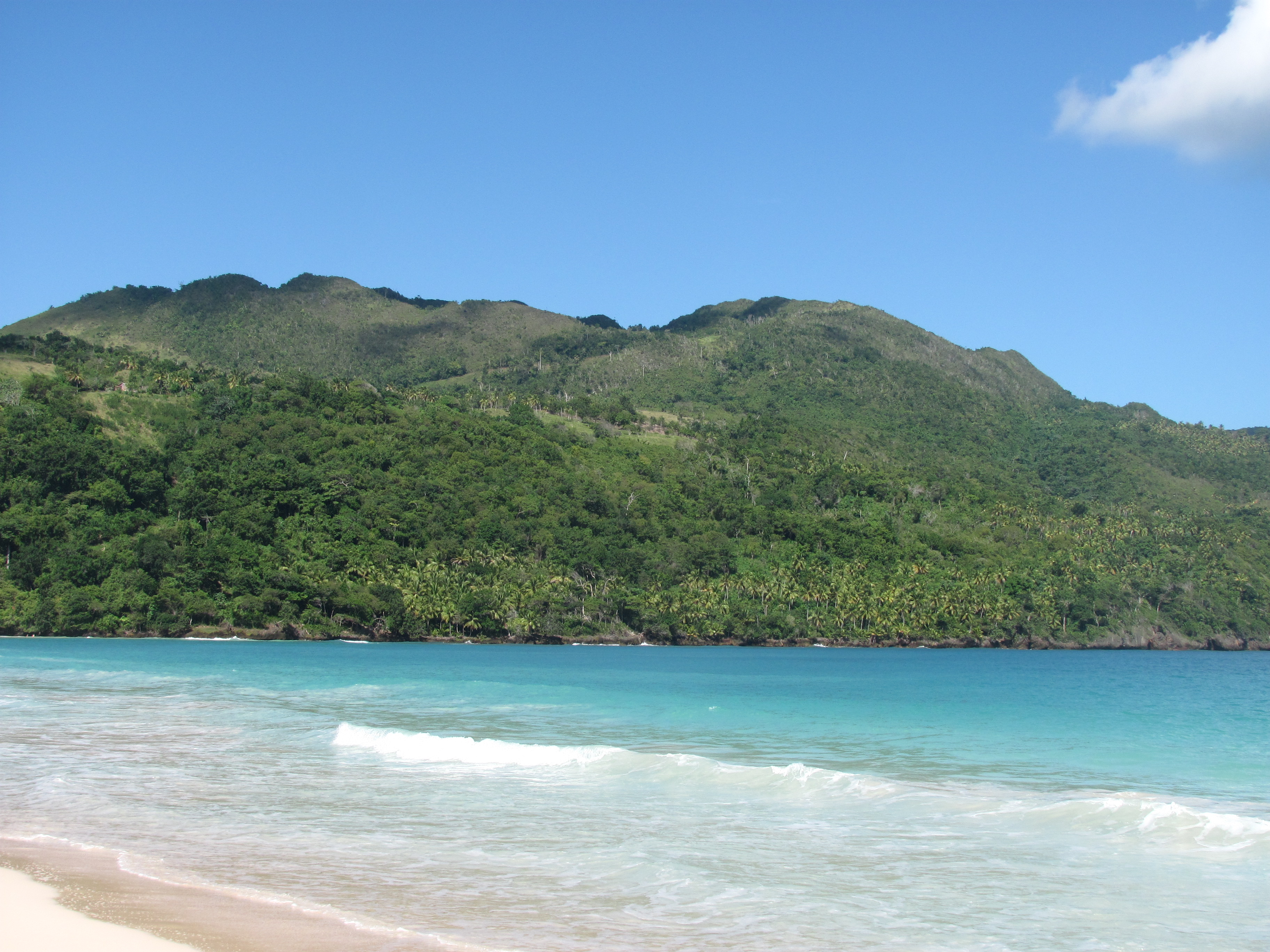
Tropical rainforest climate in Samana, Dominican Republic

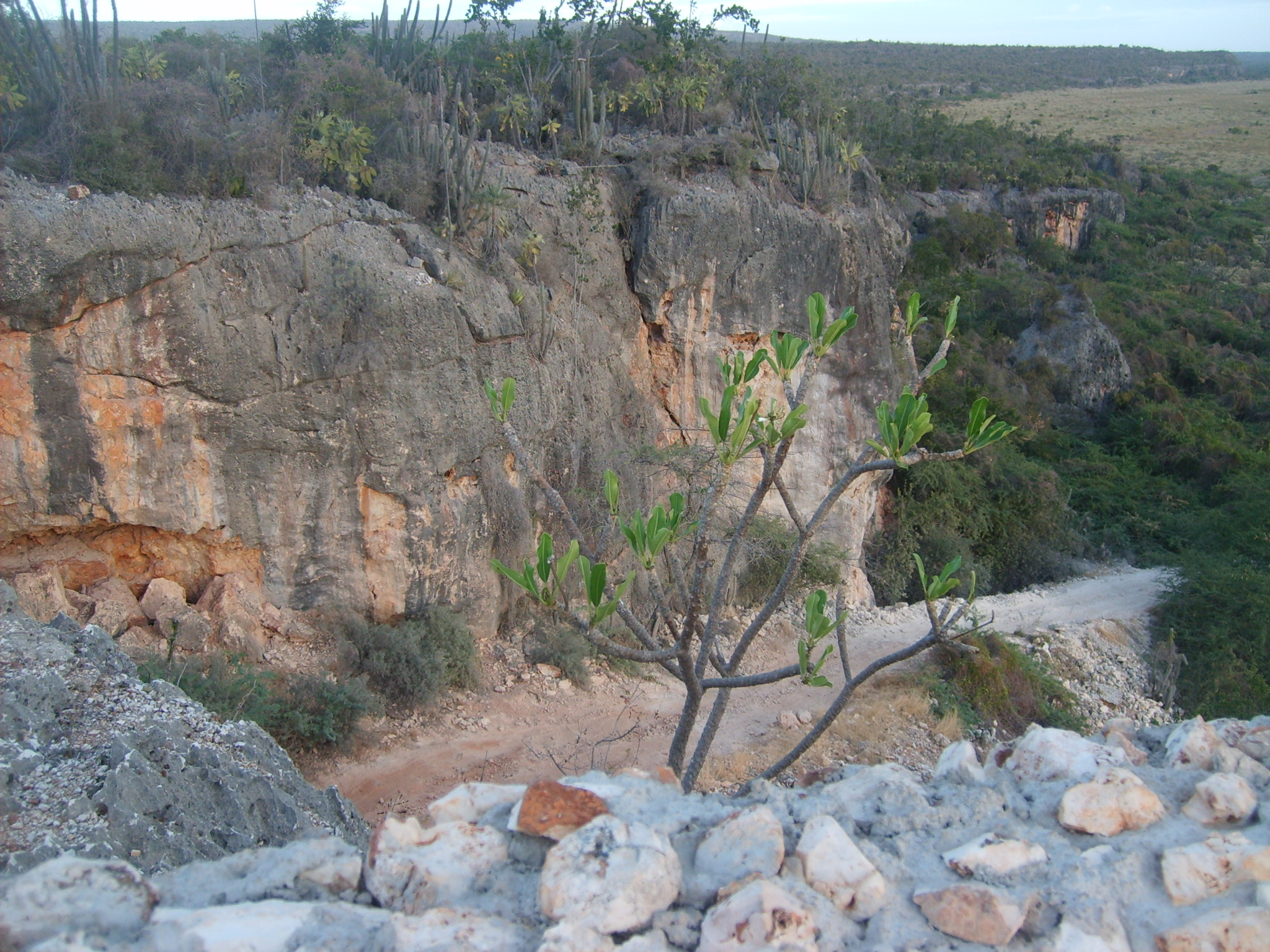
Semi-arid climate in Pedernales, Dominican Republic

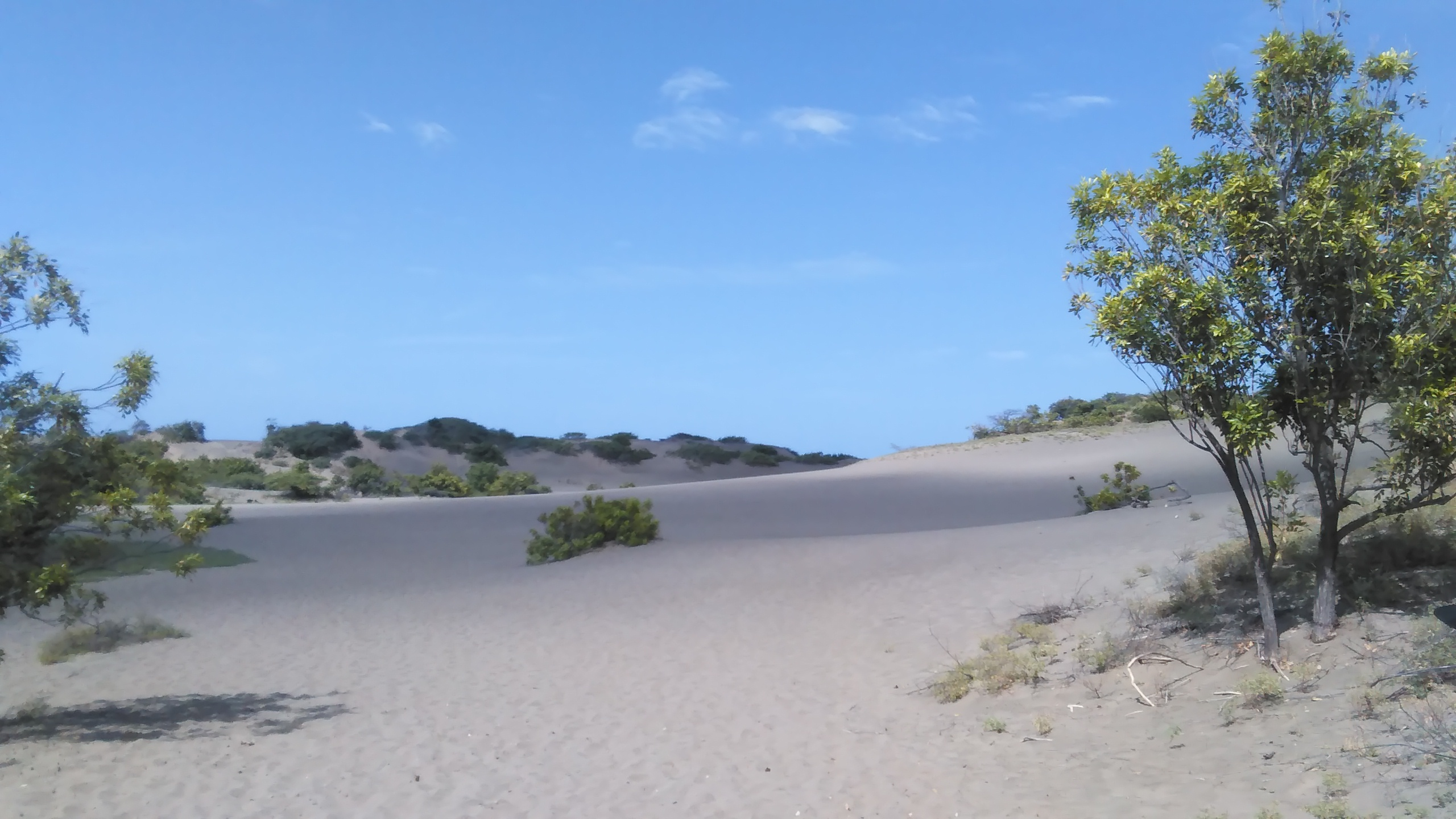
Desert sand dunes of Baní, Dominican Republic

=== Fauna ===
Bats make up 90% of the native terrestrial mammal species residing in the Dominican Republic. Lake Enriquillo, located in the Dominican Republic's southwest, is home to the largest population of American crocodiles.

== Government and politics ==
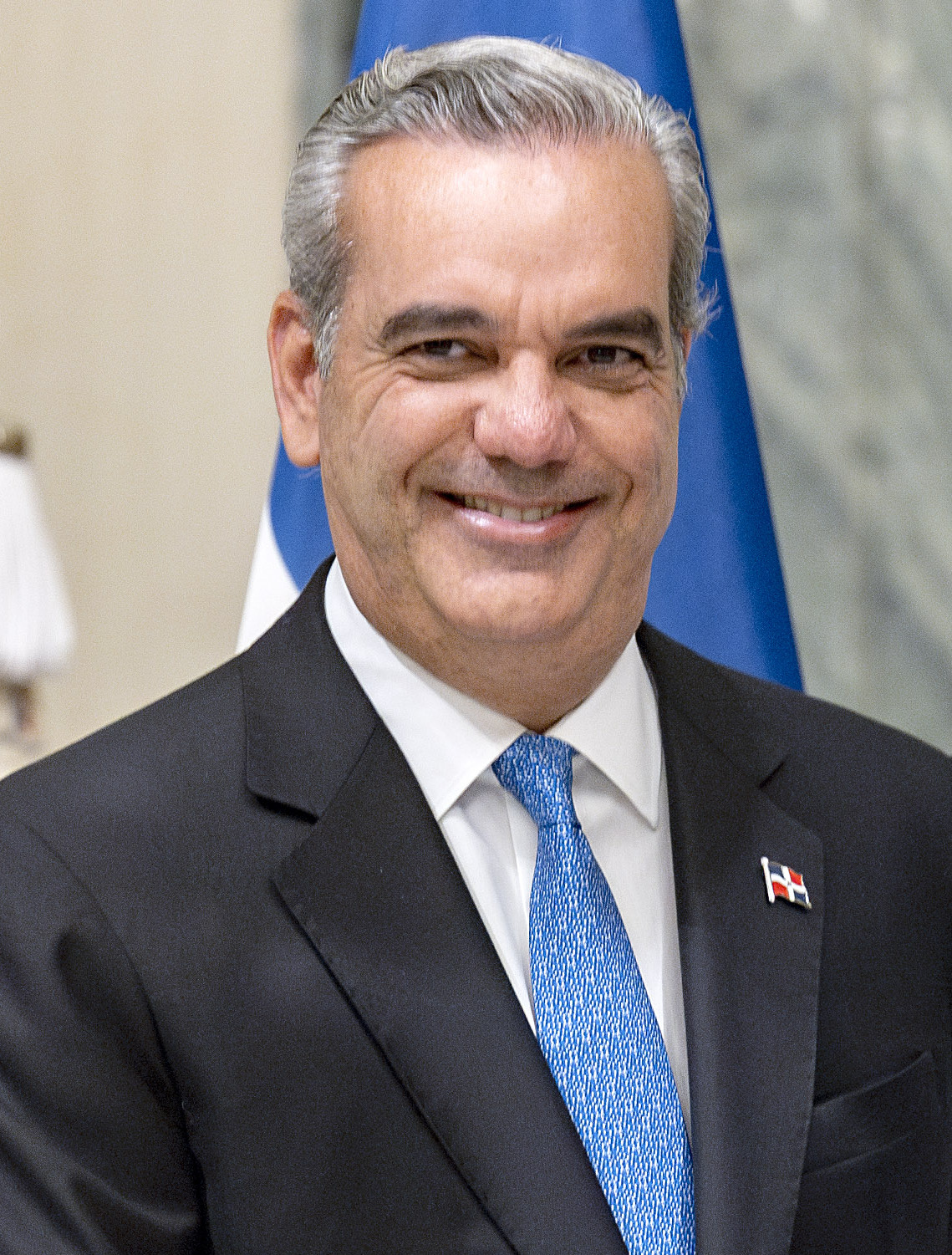
Luis Abinader
President

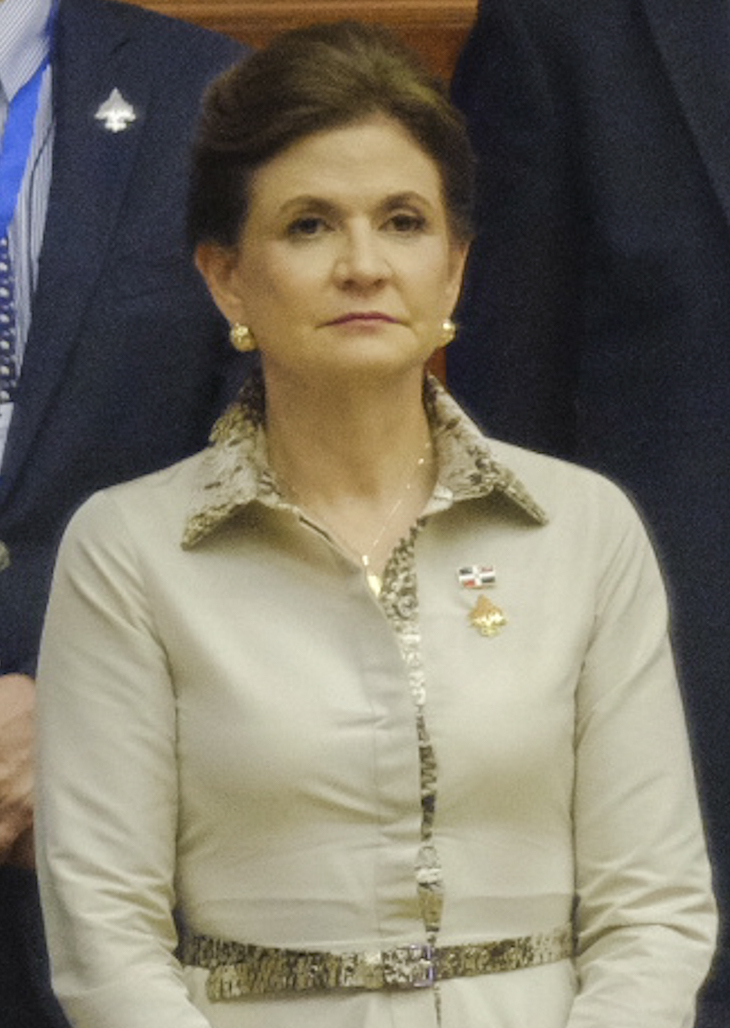
Raquel Peña
Vice President

The Dominican Republic is a representative democracy or democratic republic, with three branches of power: executive, legislative, and judicial. The president of the Dominican Republic heads the executive branch and executes laws passed by the congress, appoints the cabinet, and is commander in chief of the armed forces. The president and vice-president run for office on the same ticket and are elected by direct vote for four-year terms. The national legislature is bicameral, composed of a senate, which has 32 members, and the Chamber of Deputies, with 190 members.

Judicial authority rests with the Supreme Court of Justice's 16 members. The court "alone hears actions against the president, designated members of his Cabinet, and members of Congress when the legislature is in session." The court is appointed by a council known as the National Council of the Magistracy which is composed of the president, the leaders of both houses of Congress, the President of the Supreme Court, and an opposition or non–governing-party member.

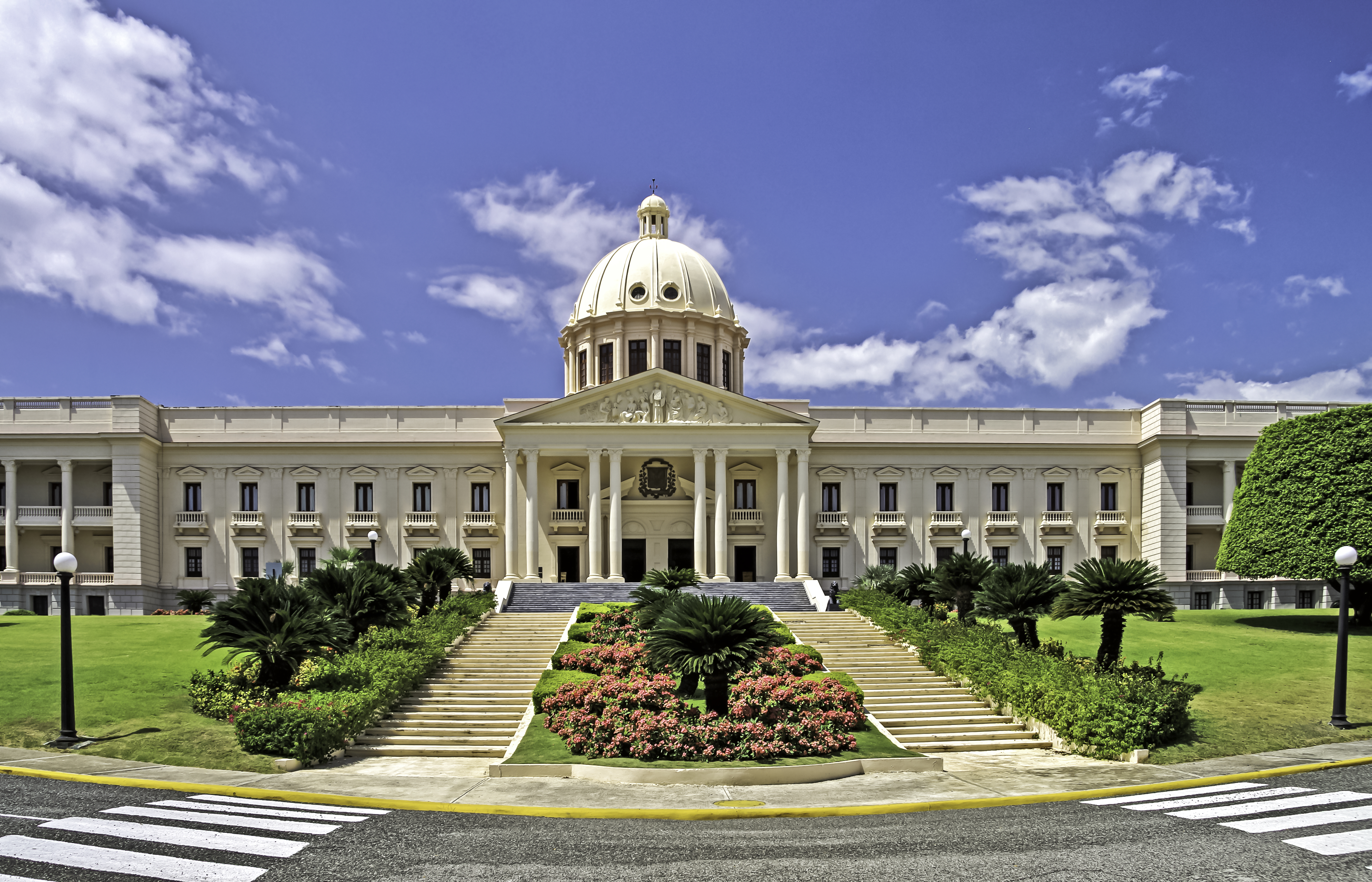
The National Palace in Santo Domingo

The Dominican Republic has a multi-party political system. Elections are held every two years, alternating between the presidential elections, which are held in years evenly divisible by four, and the congressional and municipal elections, which are held in even-numbered years not divisible by four. "International observers have found that presidential and congressional elections since 1996 have been generally free and fair." Starting in 2016, elections are held jointly, after a constitutional reform.

The three major parties are the conservative Social Christian Reformist Party (Spanish: Partido Reformista Social Cristiano (PRSC)), in power 1966–78 and 1986–96; and the social democratic Dominican Revolutionary Party (Spanish: Partido Revolucionario Dominicano (PRD)), in power in 1963, 1978–86, and 2000–04; and the Dominican Liberation Party (Spanish: Partido de la Liberación Dominicana (PLD)), in power 1996–2000 and 2004–2020. In 2020, protests erupted against the PLD's rule. The presidential candidate for the opposition Modern Revolutionary Party (PRM), Luis Abinader, won the election, defeating the PLD. Abinader was re-elected to a second term as president in the 2024 Dominican Republic general election. In his victory speech, Abinader said that the "changes that we've made are going to be irreversible", and that the "best is yet to come".

According to International IDEA's Global State of Democracy (GSoD) Indices and Democracy Tracker, the Dominican Republic performs in the mid-range on overall democratic measures, with particular strengths in civil society, inclusive suffrage, and free political parties.

=== Administrative divisions ===
Provinces of the Dominican Republic

The Dominican Republic is divided into 31 provinces. Santo Domingo, the capital, is designated Distrito Nacional (National District). The provinces are divided into municipalities (municipios; singular municipio). They are the second-level political and administrative subdivisions of the country. The president appoints the governors of the 31 provinces. Mayors and municipal councils administer the 124 municipal districts and the National District (Santo Domingo). They are elected at the same time as congressional representatives.

The provinces are the first–level administrative subdivisions of the country. The headquarters of the central government's regional offices are normally found in the capital cities of provinces. The president appoints an administrative governor (Gobernador Civil) for each province but not for the Distrito Nacional (Title IX of the constitution). The Distrito Nacional was created in 1936. Prior to this, the Distrito National was the old Santo Domingo Province, in existence since the country's independence in 1844. It is not to be confused with the new Santo Domingo Province split off from it in 2001. While it is similar to a province in many ways, the Distrito Nacional differs in its lack of an administrative governor and consisting only of one municipality, Santo Domingo, the city council (ayuntamiento) and mayor (síndico) which are in charge of its administration.

	Province	Capital city
Azua Coat of Arms	Azua	Azua de Compostela
	Baoruco	Neiba
	Barahona	Santa Cruz de Barahona
	Dajabón	Dajabón
Distrito Nacional Coat of Arms	Distrito Nacional	Santo Domingo
	Duarte	San Francisco de Macorís
	Elías Piña	Comendador
	El Seibo	Santa Cruz de El Seibo
	Espaillat	Moca
	Hato Mayor	Hato Mayor del Rey
	Hermanas Mirabal	Salcedo
	Independencia	Jimaní
	La Altagracia	Higüey
	La Romana	La Romana
La Vega Coat of Arms	La Vega	La Vega
	María Trinidad Sánchez	Nagua

	Province	Capital city
	Monseñor Nouel	Bonao
	Monte Cristi	San Fernando de Monte Cristi
	Monte Plata	Monte Plata
Pedernales Coat of Arms	Pedernales	Pedernales
	Peravia	Baní
Puerto Plata Coat of Arms	Puerto Plata	Puerto Plata
Samaná Coat of Arms	Samaná	Samaná
	San Cristóbal	San Cristóbal
	San José de Ocoa	San José de Ocoa
San Juan Coat of Arms	San Juan	San Juan de la Maguana
San Pedro de Macoris Coat of Arms	San Pedro de Macorís	San Pedro de Macorís
Seal of Sánchez Ramírez	Sánchez Ramírez	Cotuí
	Santiago	Santiago de los Caballeros
	Santiago Rodríguez	San Ignacio de Sabaneta
	Santo Domingo	Santo Domingo Este
Valverde Coat of Arms	Valverde	Santa Cruz de Mao

=== Foreign relations ===
The Dominican Republic has a close relationship with the United States, and has close cultural ties with the Commonwealth of Puerto Rico, and other states and jurisdictions of the United States.

The Dominican Republic's relationship with neighbouring Haiti is strained over mass Haitian migration to the Dominican Republic, with citizens of the Dominican Republic blaming the Haitians for increased crime and other social problems. The Dominican Republic is an observer member of the Organisation Internationale de la Francophonie.

The Dominican Republic has a free trade agreement with the United States, Costa Rica, El Salvador, Guatemala, Honduras and Nicaragua via the Dominican Republic-Central America Free Trade Agreement and an economic partnership agreement with the European Union and the Caribbean Community via the Caribbean Forum.

The Dominican Republic is the 89th most peaceful country in the world, according to the 2026 Global Peace Index.

=== Military ===
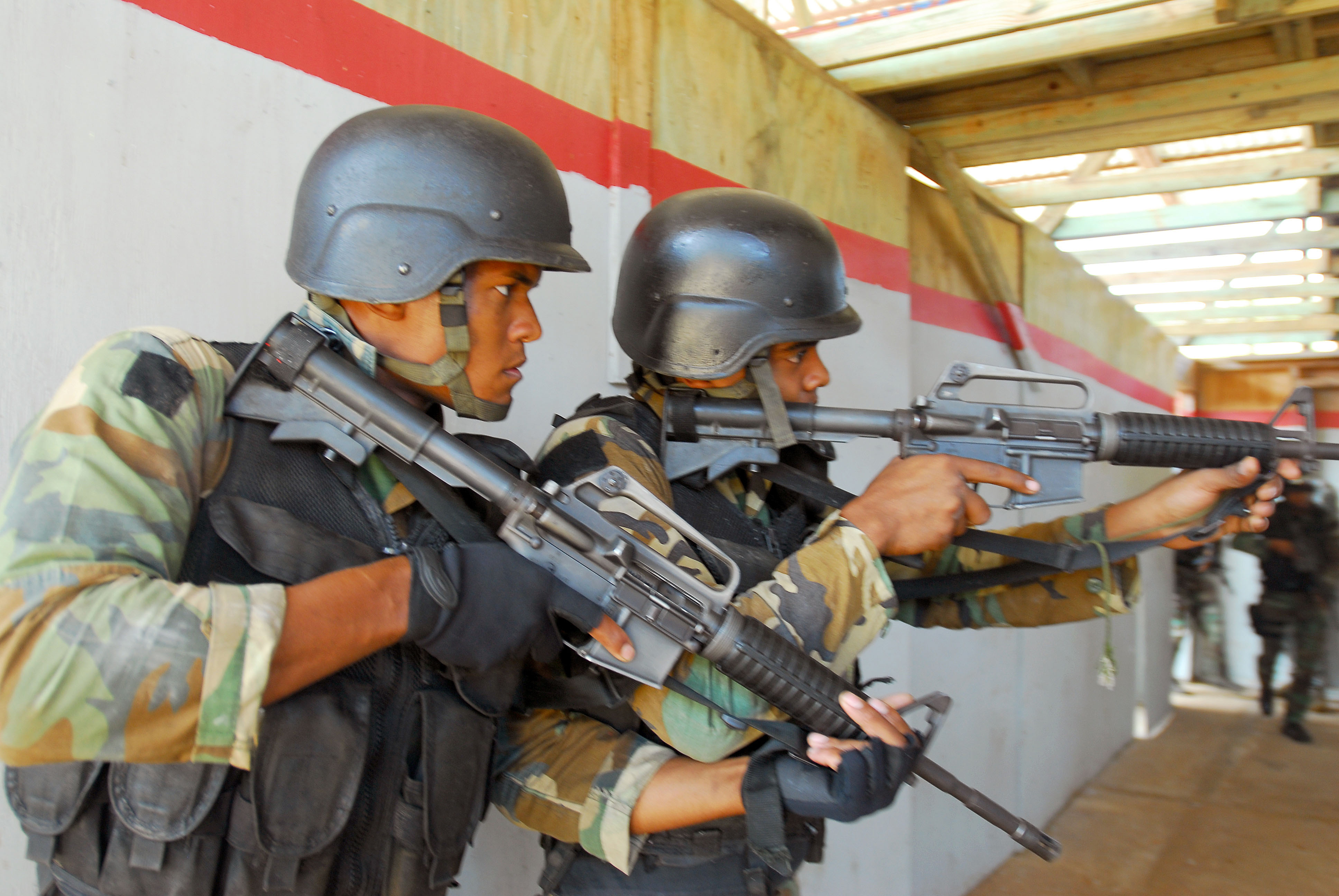
Dominican soldiers training in Santo Domingo

The Armed Forces of the Dominican Republic are the military forces of the Dominican Republic. They consist of approximately 56,000 active duty personnel. The President of the Dominican Republic is the commander in chief of the Armed Forces of the Dominican Republic and the Ministry of Defense is the chief managing body of the armed forces.

The Army, with 28,750 active duty personnel, consists of six infantry brigades, an air cavalry squadron and a combat service support brigade. The Air Force operates two main bases, one in the southern region near Santo Domingo and one in the northern region of the country, the air force operates approximately 75 aircraft including helicopters. The Navy operates two major naval bases, one in Santo Domingo and one in Las Calderas on the southwestern coast.

The armed forces have organized a Specialized Airport Security Corps (CESA) and a Specialized Port Security Corps (CESEP) to meet international security needs in these areas. The secretary of the armed forces has also announced plans to form a specialized border corps (CESEF). The armed forces provide 75% of personnel to the National Intelligence Directorate (DNI) and the Counter-Drug Directorate (DNCD).

In 2018, Dominican Republic signed the UN treaty on the Prohibition of Nuclear Weapons. Since that year, the Drone Unit of the Intelligence Directorate of the Joint Staff (J-2) has operated drones (Hovermast 150, DJI Matrice 210, and DJI Mavic) for border surveillance against illegal crossings from Haiti.

== Economy ==
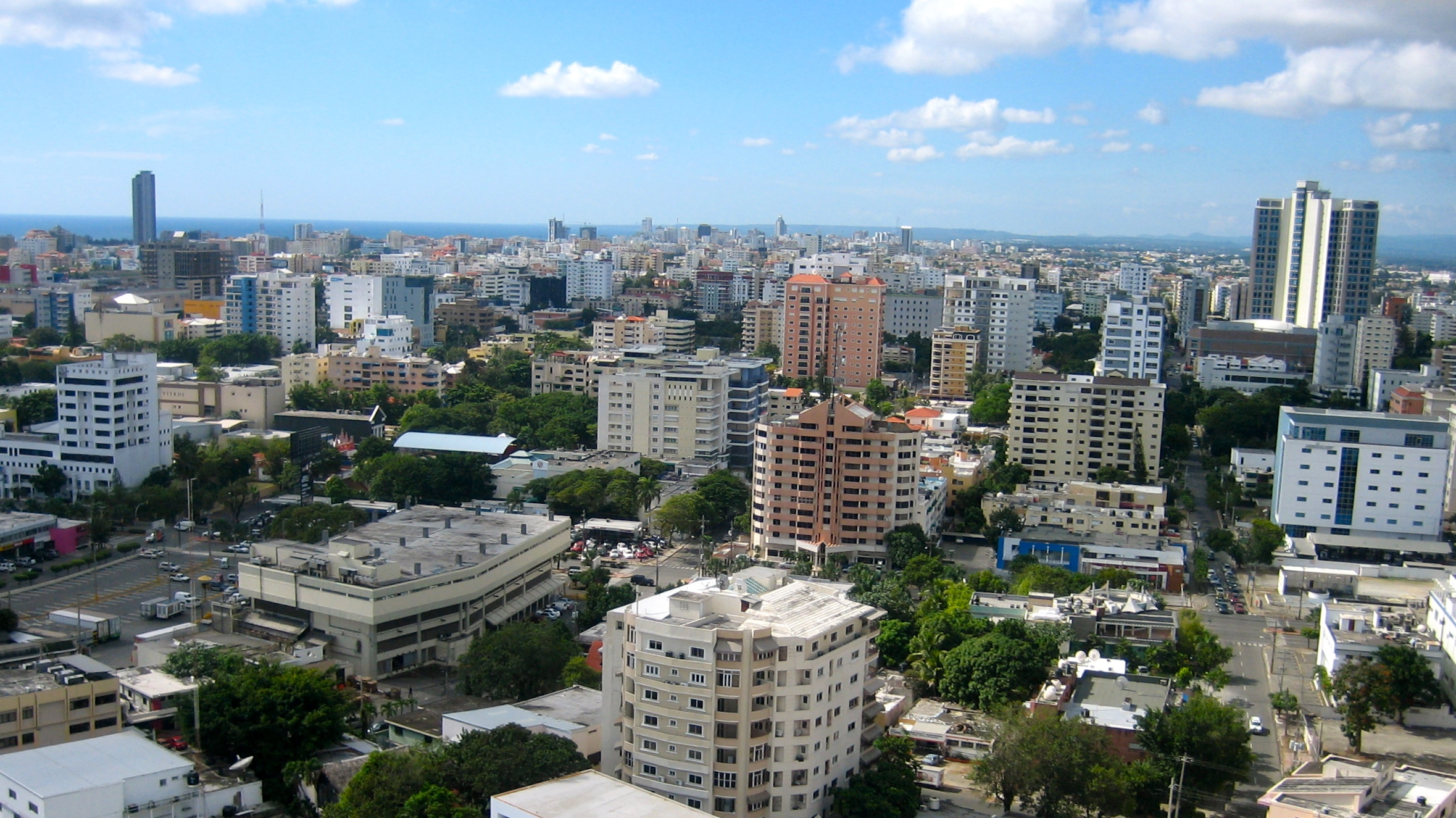
View of Santo Domingo, the Dominican Republic's capital city

During the last three decades, the Dominican economy, formerly dependent on the export of agricultural commodities (mainly sugar, cocoa and coffee), has transitioned to a diversified mix of services, manufacturing, agriculture, mining, and trade. The service sector accounts for almost 60% of GDP; manufacturing, for 22%; tourism, telecommunications and finance are the main components of the service sector; however, none of them accounts for more than 10% of the whole. The Dominican Republic has a stock market, Bolsa de Valores de la República Dominicana (BVRD). and advanced telecommunication system and transportation infrastructure. Informal employment and income inequality are long-term challenges. International migration affects the Dominican Republic greatly, as it receives and sends large flows of migrants. Mass illegal Haitian immigration and the integration of Dominicans of Haitian descent are major issues. A large Dominican diaspora exists, mostly in the United States, and Spain which contributes to development, sending billions of dollars to Dominican families in remittances.

Remittances in Dominican Republic increased to US$4571.30 million in 2014 from US$3333 million in 2013 (according to data reported by the Inter-American Development Bank). Economic growth takes place in spite of a chronic energy shortage, which causes frequent blackouts and very high prices. Despite a widening merchandise trade deficit, tourism earnings and remittances have helped build foreign exchange reserves. Following economic turmoil in the late 1980s and 1990, during which the gross domestic product (GDP) fell by up to 5% and consumer price inflation reached an unprecedented 100%, the Dominican Republic entered a period of growth and declining inflation until 2002, after which the economy entered a recession.

This recession followed the collapse of the second-largest commercial bank in the country, Baninter, linked to a major incident of fraud valued at US$3.5 billion. The Baninter fraud had a devastating effect on the Dominican economy, with GDP dropping by 1% in 2003 as inflation ballooned by over 27%. All defendants, including the star of the trial, Ramón Báez Figueroa (the great-grandson of President Buenaventura Báez), were convicted.

The Dominican Republic has a noted problem of child labor in its coffee, rice, sugarcane, and tomato industries. The labor injustices in the sugarcane industry extend to forced labor according to the U.S. Department of Labor. Three large groups own 75% of the land: the State Sugar Council (Consejo Estatal del Azúcar, CEA), Grupo Vicini, and Central Romana Corporation.

According to the 2023 Global Slavery Index, an estimated 72,000 people are enslaved in the modern day Dominican Republic, mostly Haitian inmmigrants or 0.7% of the population.

=== Currency ===
The Dominican peso (abbreviated $ or RD$; ISO 4217 code is "DOP") is the national currency, with the United States dollar, the Euro, the Canadian dollar and the Swiss franc also accepted at most tourist sites. The exchange rate to the U.S. dollar, liberalized by 1985, stood at 2.70 pesos per dollar in August 1986, 14.00 pesos in 1993, and 16.00 pesos in 2000. As of September 2018 the rate was 50.08 pesos per dollar.

=== Tourism ===
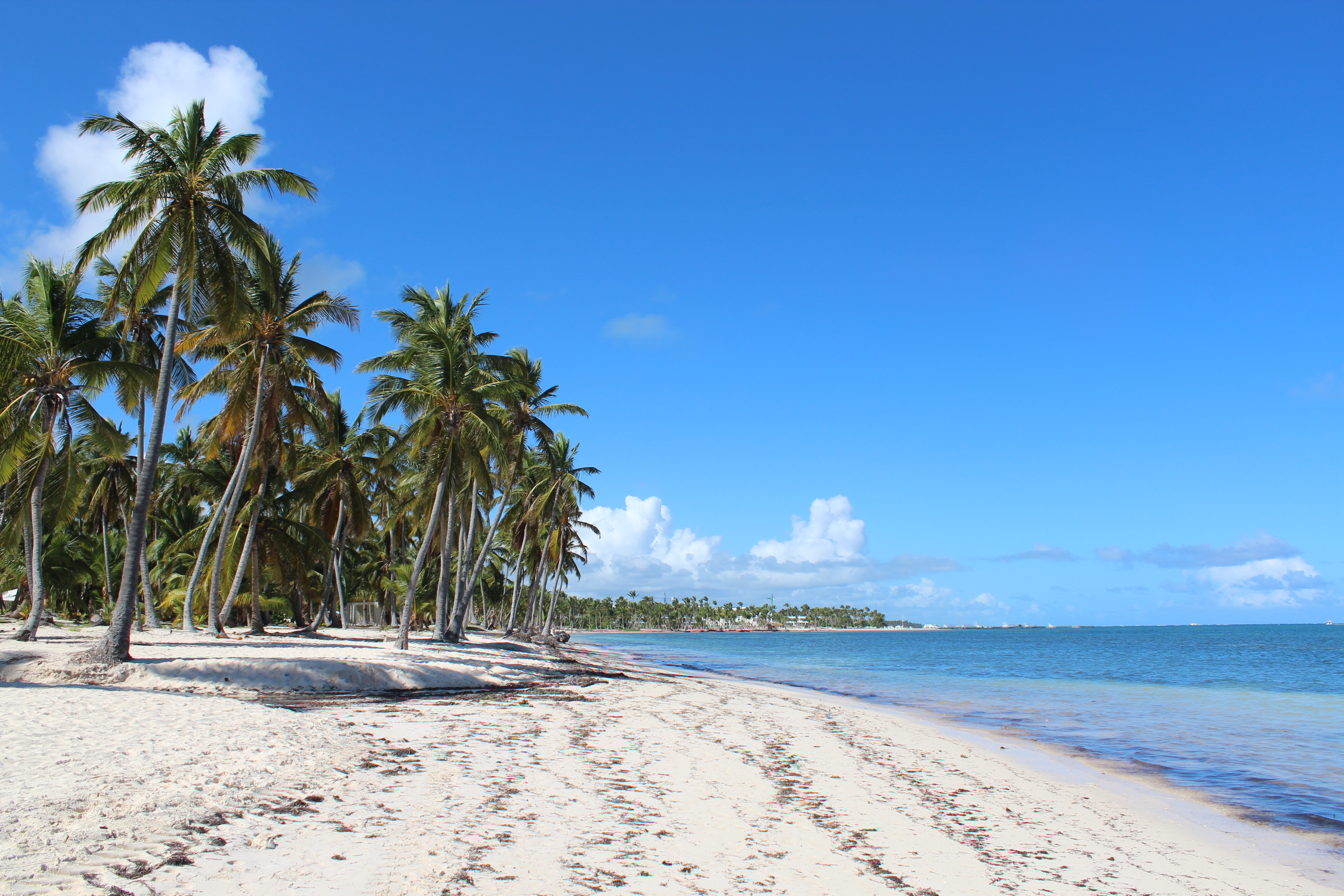
Cabeza de Toro beach, Punta Cana

Tourism is one of the fueling factors in the Dominican Republic's economic growth. The Dominican Republic is the most popular tourist destination in the Caribbean. With the construction of projects like Cap Cana, San Souci Port in Santo Domingo, Casa De Campo and the Hard Rock Hotel & Casino (ancient Moon Palace Resort) in Punta Cana, the Dominican Republic expects increased tourism activity in the upcoming years.

Ecotourism has also been a topic increasingly important, with towns like Jarabacoa and neighboring Constanza, and locations like the Pico Duarte, Bahía de las Águilas, and others becoming more significant in efforts to increase direct benefits from tourism. Most residents from other countries are required to get a tourist card, depending on the country they live in. In the last 10 years the Dominican Republic has become one of the world's notably progressive states in terms of recycling and waste disposal.

=== Communications ===
The Dominican Republic has a well developed telecommunications infrastructure, with extensive mobile phone and landline services. Cable Internet and DSL are available in most parts of the country, and many Internet service providers offer 3G wireless internet service. Projects to extend Wi-Fi hot spots have been made in Santo Domingo.

The telecommunications regulator in the country is INDOTEL (Instituto Dominicano de Telecomunicaciones). The largest telecommunications company is Claro – part of Carlos Slim's América Móvil – which provides wireless, landline, broadband, and IPTV services. In June 2009 there were more than 8 million phone line subscribers (land and cell users) in the D.R., representing 81% of the country's population and a fivefold increase since the year 2000, when there were 1.6 million. The communications sector generates about 3.0% of the GDP. There were 2,439,997 Internet users in March 2009. In November 2009, the Dominican Republic became the first Latin American country to pledge to include a "gender perspective" in every information and communications technology (ICT) initiative and policy developed by the government. This is part of the regional eLAC2010 plan. The tool the Dominicans have chosen to design and evaluate all the public policies is the APC Gender Evaluation Methodology (GEM).

=== Electricity ===
Electric power service has been unreliable since the Trujillo era, and as much as 75% of the equipment is that old. The country's antiquated power grid causes transmission losses that account for a large share of billed electricity from generators. The privatization of the sector started under a previous administration of Leonel Fernández. The recent investment in a 345 kilovolt "Santo Domingo–Santiago Electrical Highway" with reduced transmission losses, is being heralded as a major capital improvement to the national grid since the mid-1960s.

During the Trujillo regime electrical service was introduced to many cities. Almost 95% of usage was not billed at all. Around half of the Dominican Republic's 2.1 million houses have no meters and most do not pay or pay a fixed monthly rate for their electric service.

Household and general electrical service is delivered at 110 volts alternating at 60 Hz. Electrically powered items from the United States work with no modifications. The majority of the Dominican Republic has access to electricity. Tourist areas tend to have more reliable power, as do business, travel, healthcare, and vital infrastructure. Concentrated efforts were announced to increase efficiency of delivery to places where the collection rate reached 70%. The electricity sector is highly politicized. Some generating companies are undercapitalized and at times unable to purchase adequate fuel supplies.

=== Transportation ===
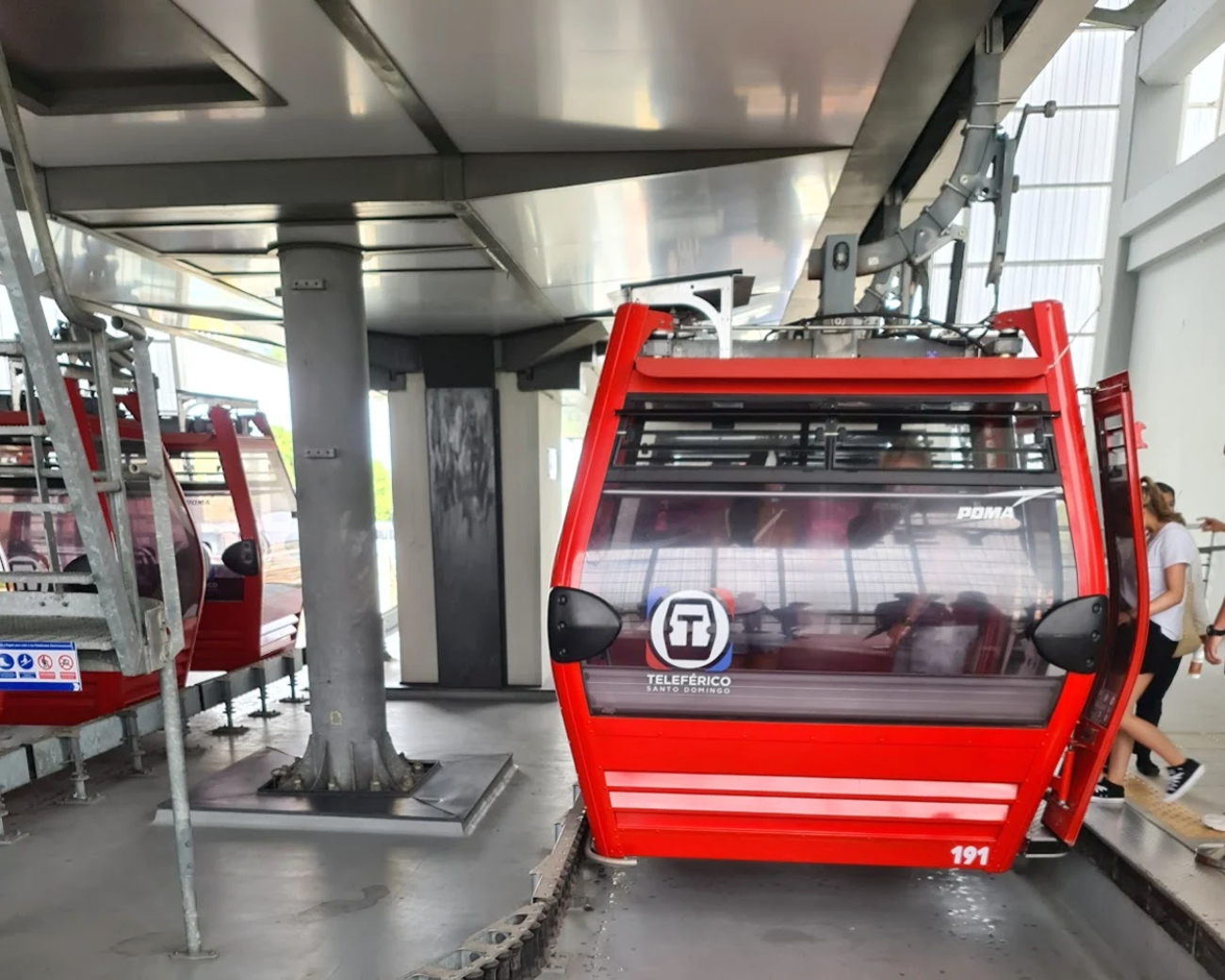
Teleférico de Santo Domingo

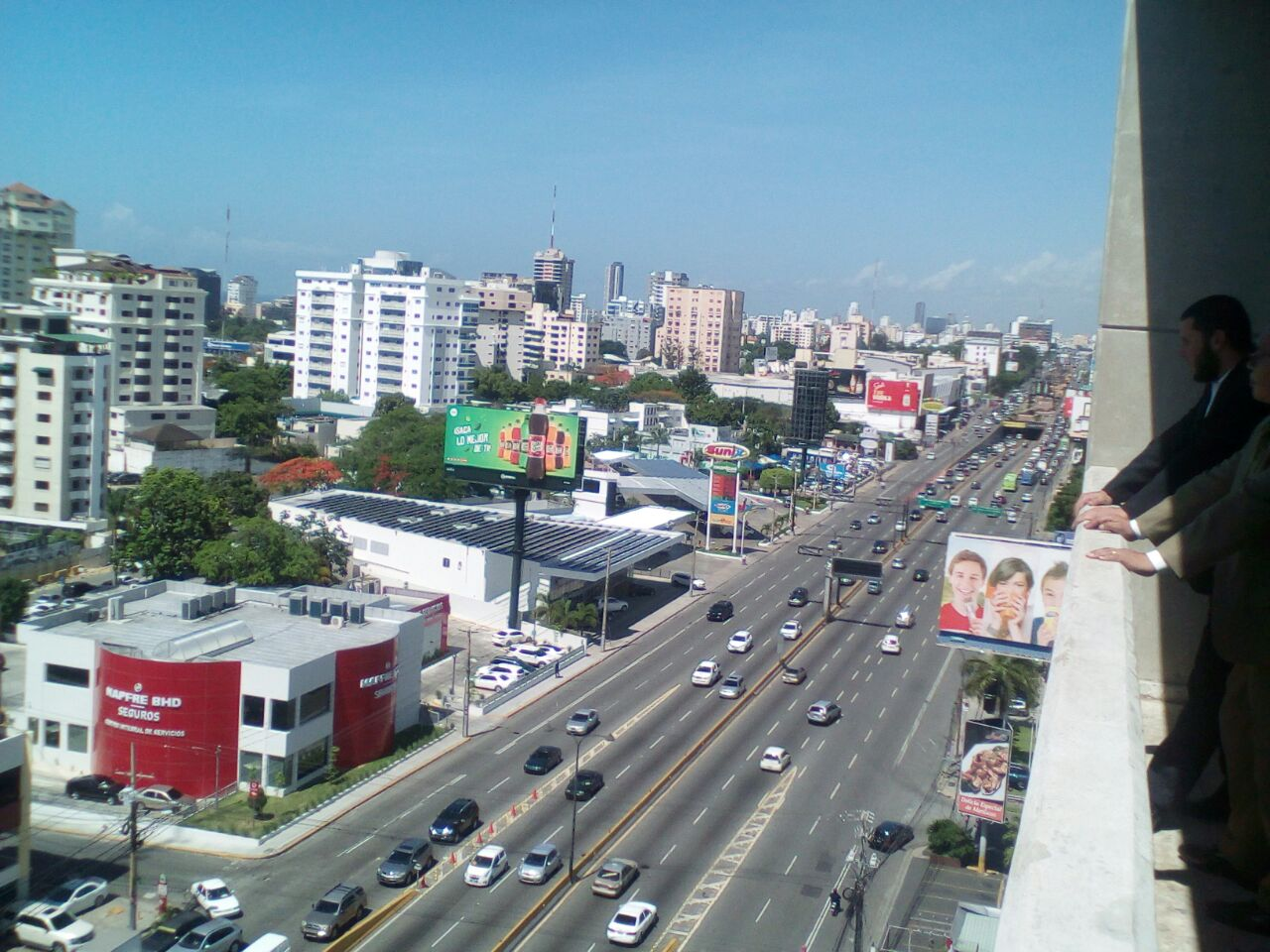
27 de Febrero Avenue in Santo Domingo

The country has three national trunk highways, which connect every major town. These are DR-1, DR-2, and DR-3, which depart from Santo Domingo toward the northern (Cibao), southwestern (Sur), and eastern (El Este) parts of the country respectively. These highways have been consistently improved with the expansion and reconstruction of many sections. Two other national highways serve as spur (DR-5) or alternative routes (DR-4).

In addition to the national highways, the government has embarked on an expansive reconstruction of spur secondary routes, which connect smaller towns to the trunk routes. In the last few years the government constructed a 106-kilometer toll road that connects Santo Domingo with the country's northeastern peninsula. Travelers may now arrive in the Samaná Peninsula in less than two hours. Other additions are the reconstruction of the DR-28 (Jarabacoa – Constanza) and DR-12 (Constanza – Bonao). Despite these efforts, many secondary routes still remain either unpaved or in need of maintenance. There is currently a nationwide program to pave these and other commonly used routes. Also, the Santiago light rail system is in planning stages but currently on hold.

==== Bus ====
There are two main bus transportation services in the Dominican Republic: one controlled by the government, through the Oficina Técnica de Transito Terrestre (OTTT) and the Oficina Metropolitana de Servicios de Autobuses (OMSA), and the other controlled by private business, among them, Federación Nacional de Transporte La Nueva Opción (FENATRANO) and the Confederacion Nacional de Transporte (CONATRA). The government transportation system covers large routes in metropolitan areas such as Santo Domingo and Santiago.

There are many privately owned bus companies, such as Metro Servicios Turísticos and Caribe Tours, that run daily routes.

==== Santo Domingo Metro ====
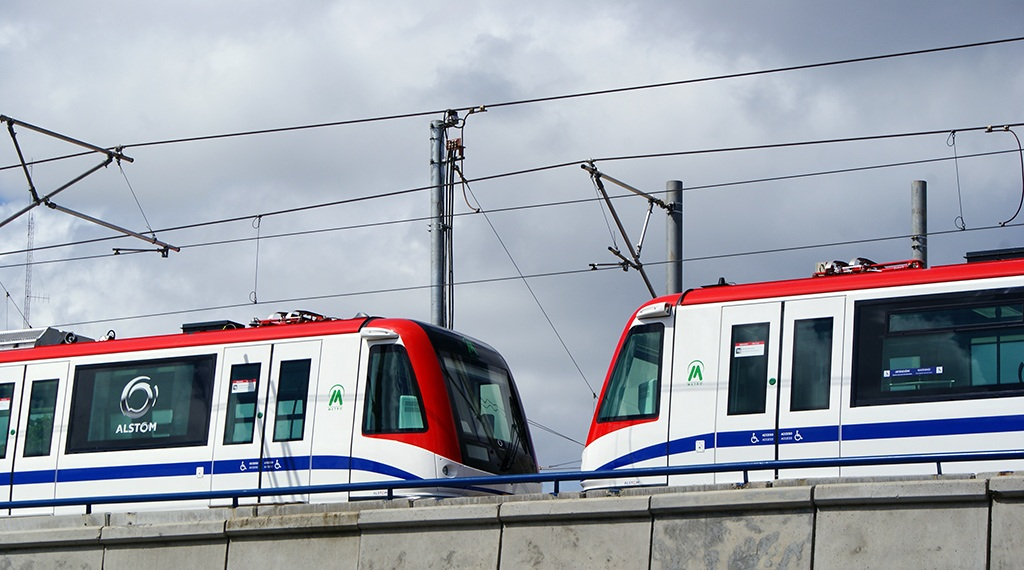
A pair of 9000 series are tested on the Santo Domingo Metro.

The Dominican Republic has a rapid transit system in Santo Domingo, the country's capital. It is the most extensive metro system in the insular Caribbean and Central American region by length and number of stations. The Santo Domingo Metro is part of a major "National Master Plan" to improve transportation in Santo Domingo as well as the rest of the nation. The first line was planned to relieve traffic congestion in the Máximo Gómez and Hermanas Mirabal Avenue. The second line, which opened in April 2013, is meant to relieve the congestion along the Duarte-Kennedy-Centenario Corridor in the city from west to east. The current length of the Metro, with the sections of the two lines open as of August 2013, is 27.35 kilometres (16.99 mi). Before the opening of the second line, 30,856,515 passengers rode the Santo Domingo Metro in 2012. With both lines opened, ridership increased to 61,270,054 passengers in 2014.

== Demographics ==
The Dominican Republic's population was 11,117,873 in 2021, compared to 2,380,000 in 1950. In 2010, 31.2% of the population was under 15 years of age, with 6% of the population over 65 years of age. There were an estimated 102.3 males for every 100 females in 2020. The annual population growth rate for 2006–2007 was 1.5%, with the projected population for the year 2015 being 10,121,000.

The population density in 2007 was 192 per km^{2} (498 per sq mi), and 63% of the population lived in urban areas. The southern coastal plains and the Cibao Valley are the most densely populated areas of the country. The capital city Santo Domingo had a population of 2,907,100 in 2010.

Other important cities are Santiago de los Caballeros (pop. 745,293), La Romana (pop. 214,109), San Pedro de Macorís (pop. 185,255), Higüey (153,174), San Francisco de Macorís (pop. 132,725), Puerto Plata (pop. 118,282), and La Vega (pop. 104,536). Per the United Nations, the urban population growth rate for 2000–2005 was 2.3%.

=== Population centres ===
Largest cities in the Dominican Republic Source: National Statistics Office (Dominican Republic) (Note: The municipalities belonging to the Commonwealth of the Greater Santo Domingo (Mancomunidad del Gran Santo Domingo) have been included into Santo Domingo's population in this list. These municipalities are: Distrito Nacional, Santo Domingo Este, Santo Domingo Norte, Santo Domingo Oeste, Los Alcarrizos, Boca Chica, Pedro Brand, San Antonio de Guerra, San Cristóbal, Bajos de Haina, and San Gregorio de Nigua) (Note: Villa Hermosa's population has been added to La Romana's population since its belongs to its Metropolitan Area.) (Note: Verón-Punta Cana, a township dependent of Higüey in political matters, has been segregated (alongside with coastal Las Lagunas de Nisibón township) from Higüey's population given its large size (over 100,000 inhabitants) and geographical distance from Higüey (50 km), and listed as "Punta Cana", its English most common name.)
Rank	Name	Province	Pop.
1	Santo Domingo	Distrito Nacional	4,274,651
2	Santiago de los Caballeros	Santiago	771,748
3	La Vega	La Vega	282,055
4	La Romana	La Romana	270,686
5	Higüey	La Altagracia	266,091
6	San Francisco de Macorís	Duarte	217,523
7	San Pedro de Macorís	San Pedro de Macorís	202,716
8	Puerto Plata	Puerto Plata	162,093
9	Baní	Peravia Province	158,019
10	Punta Cana	La Altagracia	148,993

=== Ethnic groups ===
Racial groups in the Dominican Republic (2022 census)
1. Mixed (71.7%)
2. Whites (18.7%)
3. Blacks (7.45%)
4. East Asians (0.33%)
5. Others (1.80%)

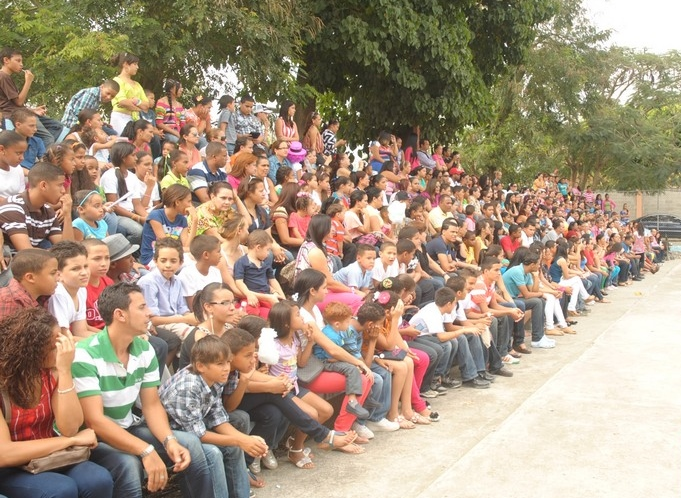
Dominican Republic people in the town of Moca

In a 2022 population survey, 71.7% self-identified as Mixed (Indio (Note: The term "indio" in the Dominican Republic is not associated with people of indigenous ancestry but people of mixed ancestry or skin color between light and dark) 34.2%, Moreno 26.1%, Mestizo 7.7%, Mulatto 3.8%), 18.7% as White, 7.4% as Black, and 0.3% as "Other". According to recent genealogical DNA studies of the Dominican population, the genetic makeup is predominantly European and Sub-Saharan African, with a lesser degree of Indigenous ancestry. The average Dominican DNA of the founder population is estimated to be 73% European, 10% Native, and 17% African. After the Haitian and Afro-Caribbean migrations the overall percentage changed to 57% European, 8% Native and 35% African. Due to mixed race Dominicans (and most Dominicans in general) being a mix of mainly European and African, with lesser amounts of Indigenous ancestry, they could be described as "Mulatto" or "Tri-racial". Dominican Republic have several informal terms to loosely describe a person's degree of racial admixture, Mestizo means any type of mixed ancestry unlike in other Latin American countries it describes specifically a European/native mix, Indio describes mixed race people whose skin color is between white and black.

The majority of the Dominican population is tri-racial, with nearly all mixed race individuals having Taíno Native American ancestry along with European (mainly Spanish) and African ancestry. European ancestry in the mixed population typically ranges between 50% and 60% on average, while African ancestry ranges between 30% and 35%, and the Native ancestry usually ranges between 8% and 12%. European and Native ancestry tends to be strongest in cities and towns of the north-central Cibao region (60%–80% European, 12–20% Taino), and generally in the mountainous interior of the country. African ancestry is strongest in coastal areas, the southeast plain, and the border regions. Race in Dominican Republic acts as a continuum of white—mulatto—black due to the large amounts of interracial mixing for hundreds of years in Dominican Republic and the Spanish Caribbean in general, allowing for high amounts of genetic diversity.

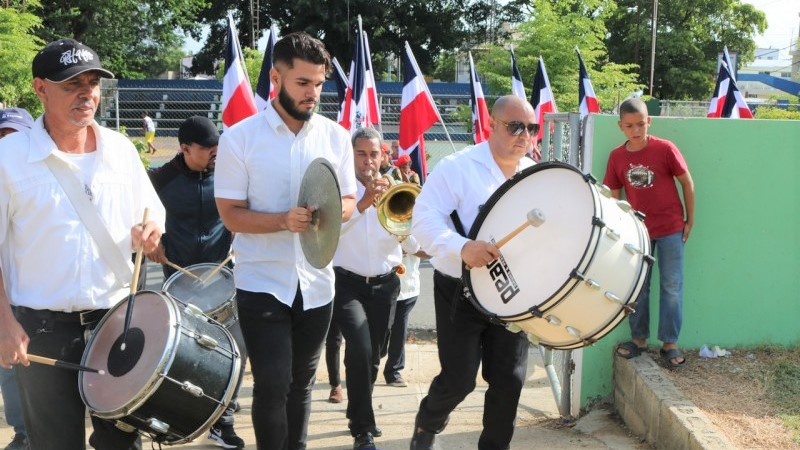
Dominican Republic people in Duarte province

Dominican Republic's citizenship is given by right of blood (Jus sanguinis), not right of soil, meaning being born in Dominican Republic does not guarantee citizenship if parents are illegal immigrants. One would either have to be born in Dominican Republic to parents who are legal citizens or apply for citizenship; citizenship is granted quite easily to people born abroad if they can prove Dominican ancestry. This means that being a Dominican citizen and being an ethnic Dominican is not always interchangeable, as the former implies citizenship that one can receive moving from any country in the world to Dominican Republic, while the latter implies a people tied by ancestry and culture. Ethnic Dominicans are people who are not only born in Dominican Republic (and have legal status) or born abroad with ancestral roots in the country, but more importantly have family roots in the country going back several generations and descend from a mix of varying degrees of Spanish, Taino, and African, the three principal foundational roots of Dominican Republic. Nearly all Dominicans are mixed race, with 75% being "visibly" and "evenly" mixed, and the remaining 25% being predominantly of African or European blood. According to a 2017 estimate from the Dominican government, Dominican Republic had a population of 10,189,895, of which 847,979 were immigrants or descendants of recent immigrants and 9,341,916 were ethnic Dominicans. Most Dominicans embrace all sides of their mixed race heritage, but often identify with their nationality first and foremost. Many Dominicans born in the United States now reside in the Dominican Republic, estimated at around 250,000, creating a kind of expatriate community, who have a growing influence and role in the economic growth of the republic.

Haitians make up the largest ethnic immigrant group in the country, a large majority of them are illegal, in a distant second place are the Venezuelans. Other groups in the country include the descendants of West Asians—mostly Lebanese, Syrians and Palestinians. A smaller, yet significant presence of East Asians (primarily ethnic Chinese and Japanese) can also be found throughout the population. Dominicans are also composed of Sephardic Jews that were exiled from Spain and the Mediterranean area in 1492 and 1497, coupled with other migrations dating to the 1700s and during the Second World War contribute to Dominican ancestry.

=== Languages ===
The population of the Dominican Republic is mostly Spanish-speaking, with the only people who do not speak Spanish fluently being some immigrants. The local variant of Spanish is called Dominican Spanish, which closely resembles other Spanish vernaculars in the Caribbean and has similarities to Canarian Spanish. In addition, it has influences from African languages and borrowed words from indigenous Caribbean languages particular to the island of Hispaniola. Schools are based on a Spanish educational model; English and French are mandatory foreign languages in both private and public schools, although the quality of foreign languages teaching is poor.

Haitian Creole is the largest minority language in the Dominican Republic and is spoken by Haitian immigrants and their descendants. There is a community of a few thousand people whose ancestors spoke Samaná English in the Samaná Peninsula. They are the descendants of formerly enslaved African Americans who arrived in the nineteenth century, but only a few elders speak the language today. Tourism, American pop culture, the influence of Dominican Americans, and the country's economic ties with the United States motivate other Dominicans to learn English. In the 2025 EF English Proficiency Index, the Dominican Republic is ranked 63rd in the world with a "moderate" proficiency level.

Mother tongue of the Dominican population, 1950 Census
Language	Total %	Urban %	Rural %
Spanish	98.00	97.82	98.06
French	1.19	0.39	1.44
English	0.57	0.96	0.45
Arabic	0.09	0.35	0.01
Italian	0.03	0.10	0.006
Other language	0.12	0.35	0.04

=== Religion ===
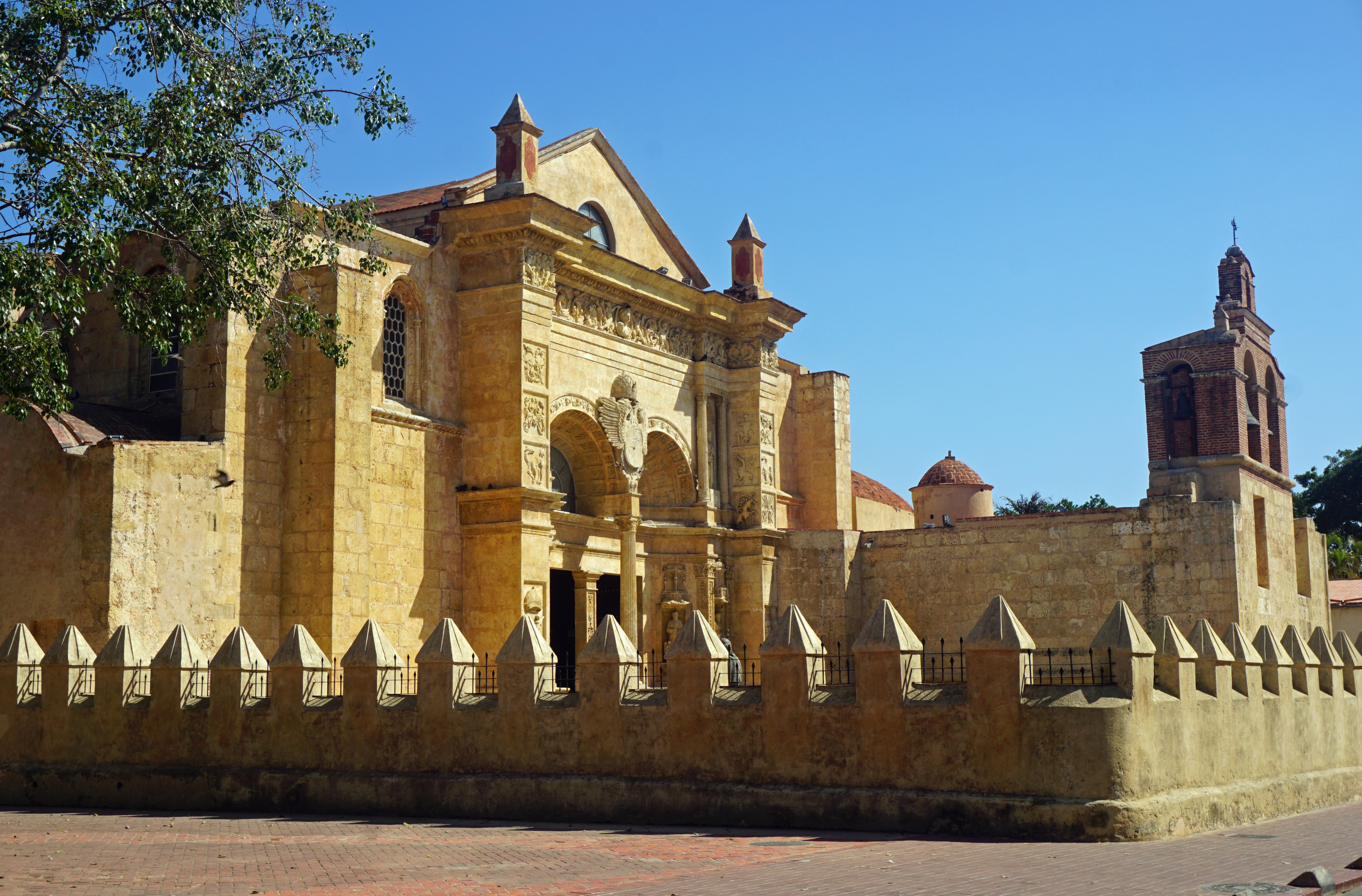
The Gothic Cathedral of Santa María la Menor, Santo Domingo, is the oldest cathedral in the Americas, built between 1514 and 1541.

Christianity is the most widely professed religion in the Dominican Republic. Historically, Catholicism dominated the religious practices of the country, and as the official religion of the state it receives financial support from the government. As of 2014, 57% of the population (5.7 million) identified themselves as Roman Catholics and 23% (2.3 million) as Protestants (in Latin American countries, Protestants are often called Evangelicos because they emphasize personal and public evangelising and many are Evangelical Protestant or of a Pentecostal group). From 1896 to 1907 missionaries from the Episcopal, Free Methodist, Seventh-day Adventist and Moravian churches began work in the Dominican Republic. Three percent of the 10.63 million Dominican Republic population are Seventh-day Adventists. Recent immigration as well as proselytizing efforts have brought in other religious groups, with the following shares of the population: Spiritist: 2.2%, The Church of Jesus Christ of Latter-day Saints: 1.3%, Buddhist: 0.1%, Baháʼí: 0.1%, Chinese Folk Religion: 0.1%, Islam: 0.02%, Judaism: 0.01%.

The Catholic Church began to lose its strong dominance in the late 19th century. This was due to a lack of funding, priests, and support programs. During the same time, Protestant Evangelicalism began to gain wider support "with their emphasis on personal responsibility and family rejuvenation, economic entrepreneurship, and biblical fundamentalism". The Dominican Republic has two Catholic patroness saints: Nuestra Señora de la Altagracia (Our Lady Of High Grace) and Nuestra Señora de las Mercedes (Our Lady Of Mercy).

The Dominican Republic has historically granted extensive religious freedom. According to the United States Department of State, "The constitution specifies that there is no state church and provides for freedom of religion and belief. A concordat with the Vatican designates Catholicism as the official religion and extends special privileges to the Catholic Church not granted to other religious groups. These include the legal recognition of church law, use of public funds to underwrite some church expenses, and complete exoneration from customs duties." In the 1950s restrictions were placed upon churches by the government of Trujillo. Letters of protest were sent against the mass arrests of government adversaries. Trujillo began a campaign against the Catholic Church and planned to arrest priests and bishops who preached against the government. This campaign ended before it was put into place, with his assassination.

During World War II a group of Jews escaping Nazi Germany fled to the Dominican Republic and founded the city of Sosúa. It has remained the center of the Jewish population since.

=== Immigration in the 20th and 21st centuries ===
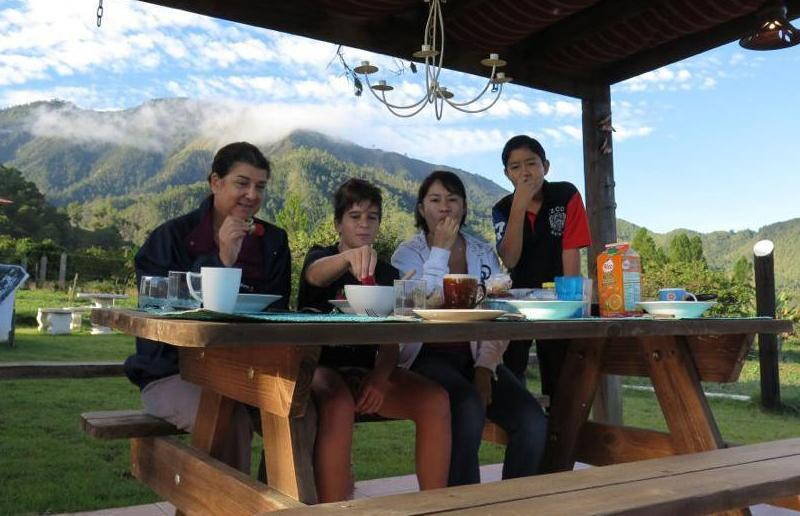
Family of Japanese Dominicans in the Constanza neighbourhood

In the 20th century, many Arabs (from the Ottoman Empire), Japanese, and, to a lesser degree, Koreans settled in the country as agricultural laborers and merchants. The Chinese companies found business in telecom, mining, and railroads. The Arab community is estimated at 80,000.

Immigrant groups in the country include West Asians—mostly Lebanese, Syrians, and Palestinians; the current president, Luis Abinader, is of Lebanese descent. East Asians, Koreans, ethnic Chinese and Japanese, can also be found. Europeans are represented mostly by Spanish whites but also with smaller populations of Germans, Italians, French, British, Dutch, Swiss, Russians, and Hungarians.

In addition, there are descendants of immigrants who came from other Caribbean islands, including St. Kitts and Nevis, Antigua, St. Vincent, Montserrat, Tortola, St. Croix, St. Thomas, and Guadeloupe. They are known locally as Cocolos. They worked on sugarcane plantations and docks and settled mainly in the cities of San Pedro de Macorís and Puerto Plata. Puerto Rican, and to a lesser extent, Cuban immigrants fled to the Dominican Republic from the mid-1800s until about 1940 due to a poor economy and social unrest in their respective home countries. Many Puerto Rican immigrants settled in Higüey, among other cities, and quickly assimilated due to similar culture. Before and during World War II, 800 Jewish refugees moved to the Dominican Republic.

Numerous immigrants have come from other Caribbean countries, as the country has offered economic opportunities. There are many Haitians and Venezuelans living in the Dominican Republic. They are the largest immigrant groups in the country currently, and large numbers of both groups are present in the country illegally. There is an increasing number of well-off Puerto Rican immigrants, owning businesses and vacation homes in the country, many retiring there, they are believed to number around 10,000. Many Europeans and Americans (non-Puerto Rican) are also retiring in the country. About 300,000 U.S. citizens reside in Dominican Republic, of which 250,000 are Dominican Americans whom have returned to the country, and 50,000 are Americans of non-Dominican ancestry from the mainland United States and the U.S. territory of Puerto Rico.

The 2010 Census registered 311,969 Haitians; 24,457 Americans; 6,691 Spaniards; 5,763 Puerto Ricans; and 5,132 Venezuelans. In 2012, the Dominican government made a survey of immigrants in the country and found that there were: 329,281 Haitian-born; 25,814 U.S.-born (excluding Puerto Rican-born); 7,062 Spanish-born; 6,083 Puerto Rican-born; 5,417 Venezuelan-born; 3,841 Cuban-born; 3,795 Italian-born; 3,606 Colombian-born; 2,043 French-born; 1,661 German-born; 1,484 Chinese-born; among others. In the second half of 2017, a second survey of foreign population was conducted in the Dominican Republic. The total population in the Dominican Republic was estimated at 10,189,895, of which 9,341,916 were Dominicans with no foreign background. According to the survey, the majority of the people with foreign background were of Haitian origin (751,080 out of 847,979, or 88.6%), breaking down as follows: 497,825 were Haitians born in Haiti, 171,859 Haitians born in the Dominican Republic and 81,590 Dominicans with a Haitian parent. Other main sources of foreign-born population were Venezuela (25,872), the United States (10,016), Spain (7,592), Italy (3,713), China (3,069), Colombia (2,642), Puerto Rico (2,356), and Cuba (2,024).

==== Haitian immigration ====
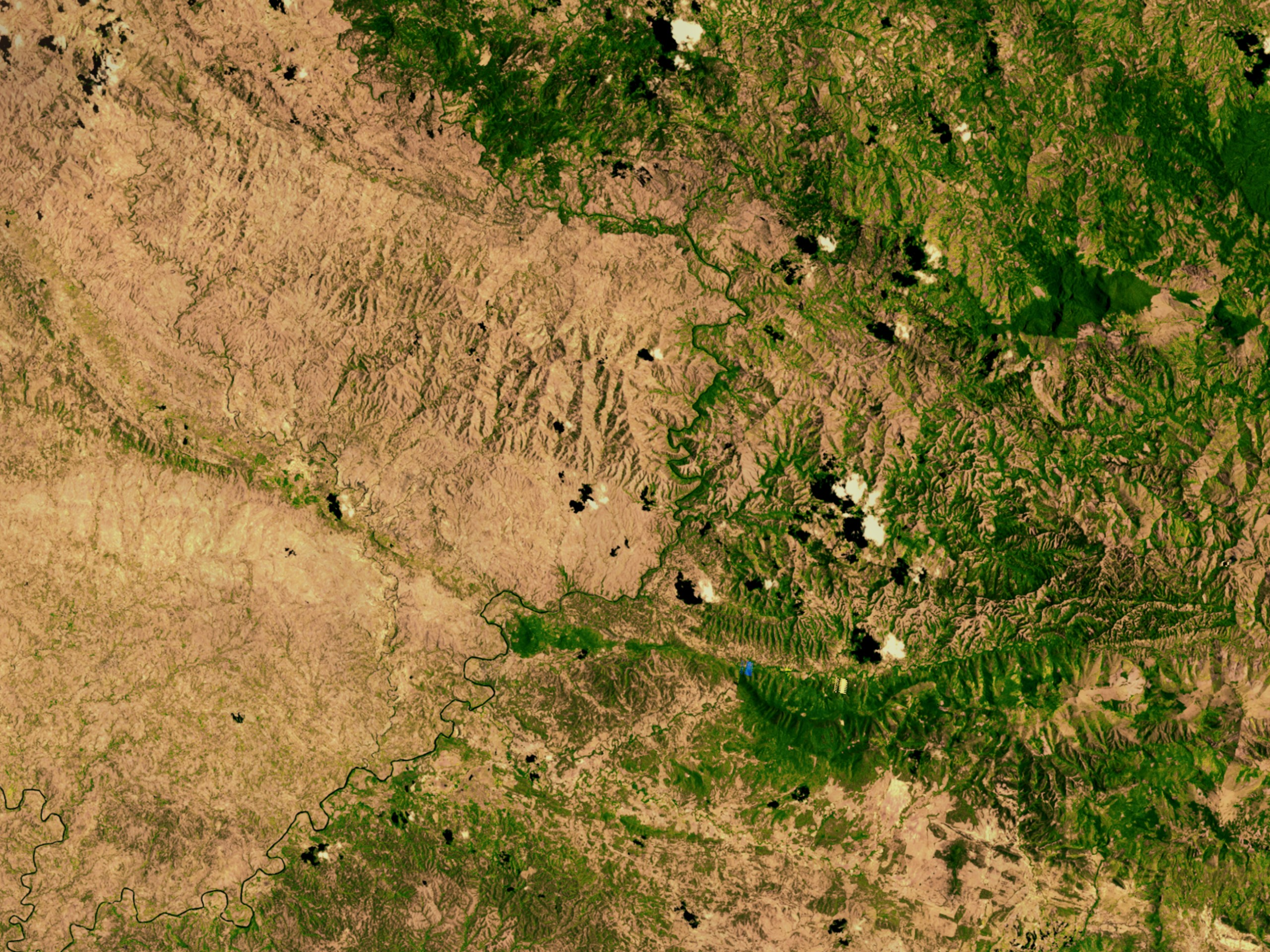
A satellite image of the border between Haiti (left) and the Dominican Republic (right), highlighting the deforestation on the Haitian side

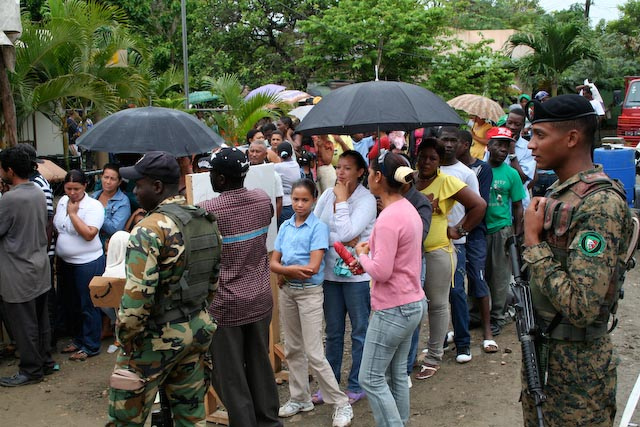
Dominicans and Haitians lined up to attend medical providers from the U.S. Army Reserve

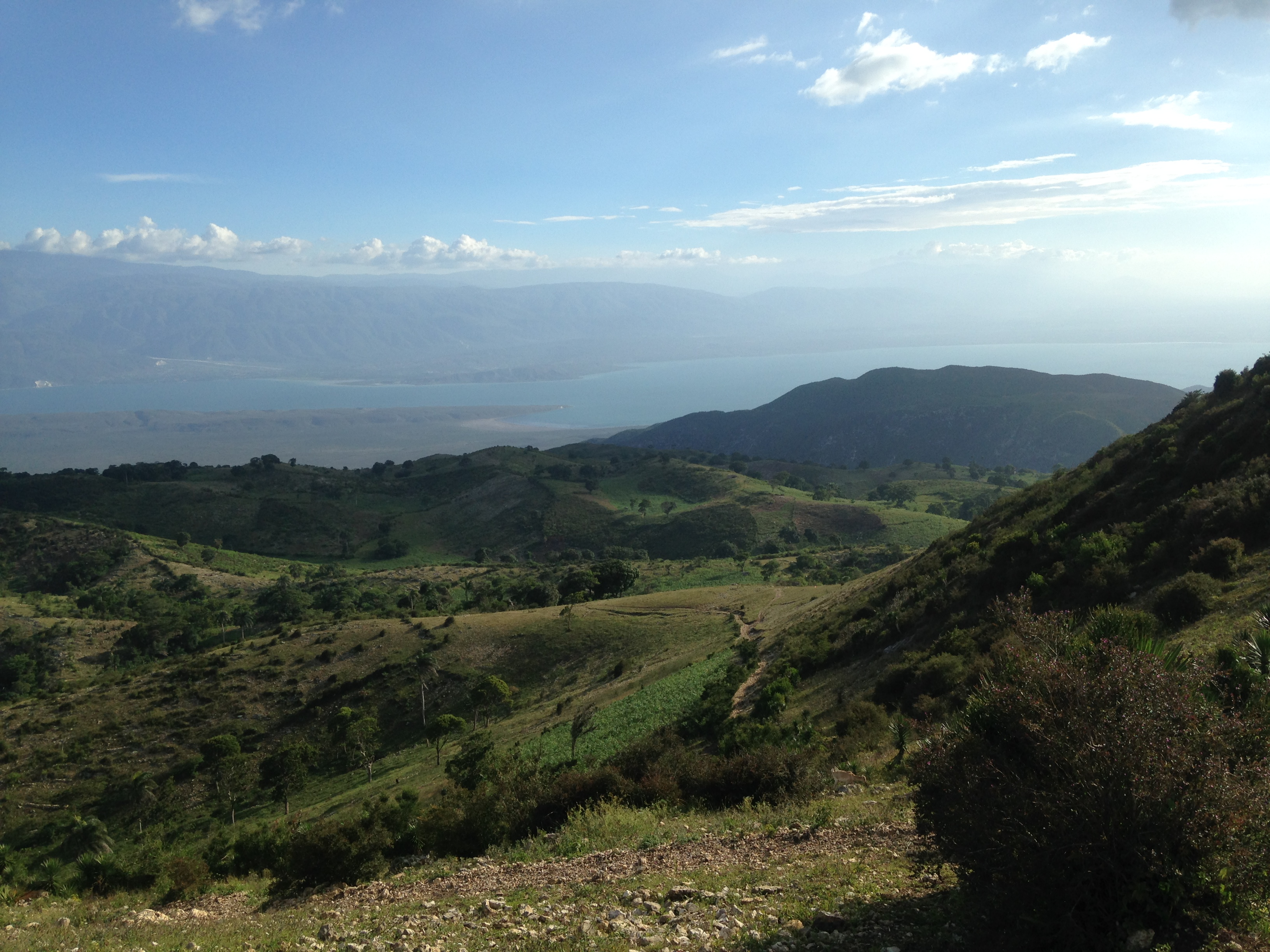
View of border region between the Dominican Republic and Haiti. The border runs horizontally through the middle of the picture.

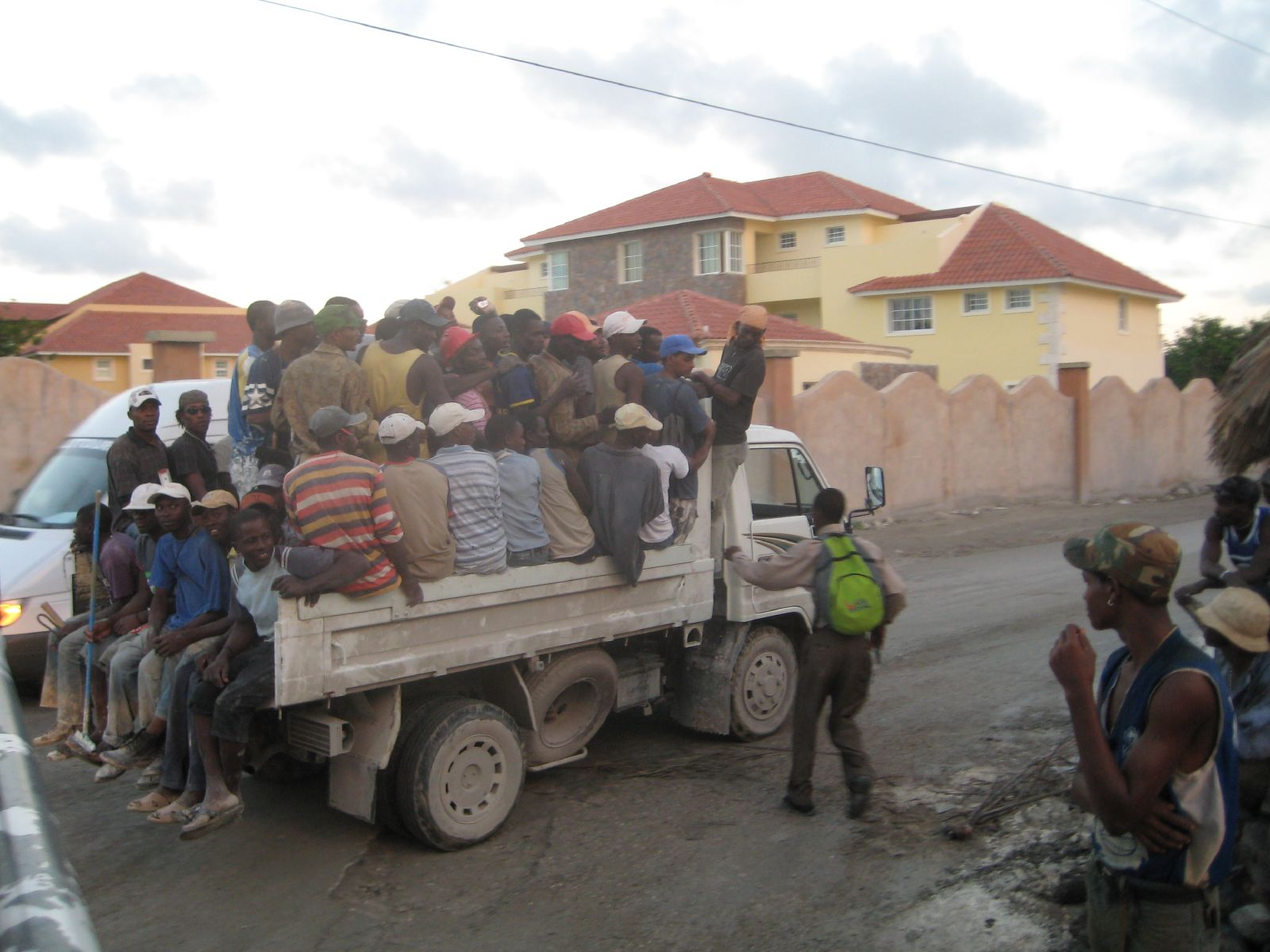
Haitian workers being transported in Punta Cana, the Dominican Republic

Human Rights Watch estimated that 70,000 documented Haitian immigrants and 1,930,000 undocumented immigrants were living in Dominican Republic. (Note: Illegal immigration from Haiti has resulted in government action. Immigration from Haiti has increased tensions between Dominicans and Haitians. The Dominican Republic is also home to 114,050 illegal immigrants from Venezuela.)

Haiti is the neighboring nation to the Dominican Republic and is considerably poorer, less developed and is additionally the least developed country in the western hemisphere. In 2003, 80% of all Haitians were poor (54% living in abject poverty) and 47.1% were illiterate. The country of nine million people also has a fast growing population, but over two-thirds of the labor force lack formal jobs. Haiti's per capita GDP (PPP) was $1,800 in 2017, or just over one-tenth of the Dominican figure.

As a result, hundreds of thousands of Haitians have migrated to the Dominican Republic, with some estimates of 800,000 Haitians in the country, while others put the Haitian-born population as high as one million. They usually work at low-paying and unskilled jobs in building construction and house cleaning and in sugar plantations. There have been accusations that some Haitian immigrants work in slavery-like conditions and are severely exploited.

Due to the lack of basic amenities and medical facilities in Haiti a large number of Haitian women, often arriving with several health problems, cross the border to Dominican soil. They deliberately come during their last weeks of pregnancy to obtain medical attention for childbirth, since Dominican public hospitals do not refuse medical services based on nationality or legal status. Statistics from a hospital in Santo Domingo report that over 22% of childbirths are by Haitian mothers.

Haiti also suffers from severe environmental degradation. Deforestation is rampant in Haiti; today less than 4 percent of Haiti's forests remain, and in many places the soil has eroded right down to the bedrock. Haitians burn wood charcoal for 60% of their domestic energy production. Because of Haiti running out of plant material to burn, some Haitian bootleggers have created an illegal market for charcoal on the Dominican side. Conservative estimates calculate the illegal movement of 115 tons of charcoal per week from the Dominican Republic to Haiti. Dominican officials estimate that at least 10 trucks per week are crossing the border loaded with charcoal.

In 2005, Dominican President Leonel Fernández criticized collective expulsions of Haitians as having taken place "in an abusive and inhuman way". After a UN delegation issued a preliminary report stating that it found a profound problem of racism and discrimination against people of Haitian origin, Dominican Foreign Minister Carlos Morales Troncoso issued a formal statement denouncing it, asserting that "our border with Haiti has its problems[;] this is our reality and it must be understood. It is important not to confuse national sovereignty with indifference, and not to confuse security with xenophobia."

Haitian nationals send half a billion dollars total yearly in remittance from the Dominican Republic to Haiti, according to the World Bank.

The government of the Dominican Republic invested a total of $16 billion pesos in health services offered to foreign patients in 2013–2016, according to official data, which includes medical expenses in blood transfusion, clinical analysis, surgeries and other care. According to official reports, the country spends more than five billion Dominican pesos annually in care for pregnant women who cross the border ready to deliver.

The children of Haitian immigrants are eligible for Haitian nationality, but they may be denied it by Haiti because of a lack of proper documents or witnesses.

In 2023, the Dominican Republic deported over 185,000 Haitian men, women, and children, followed by more than 230,000 in 2024 and a record 370,000 in 2025, many of whom were deported in caged trucks. The Dominican Republic ignored the United Nations' call to halt deportations to Haiti, where over 5.7 million people faced famine in 2024.

=== Emigration ===
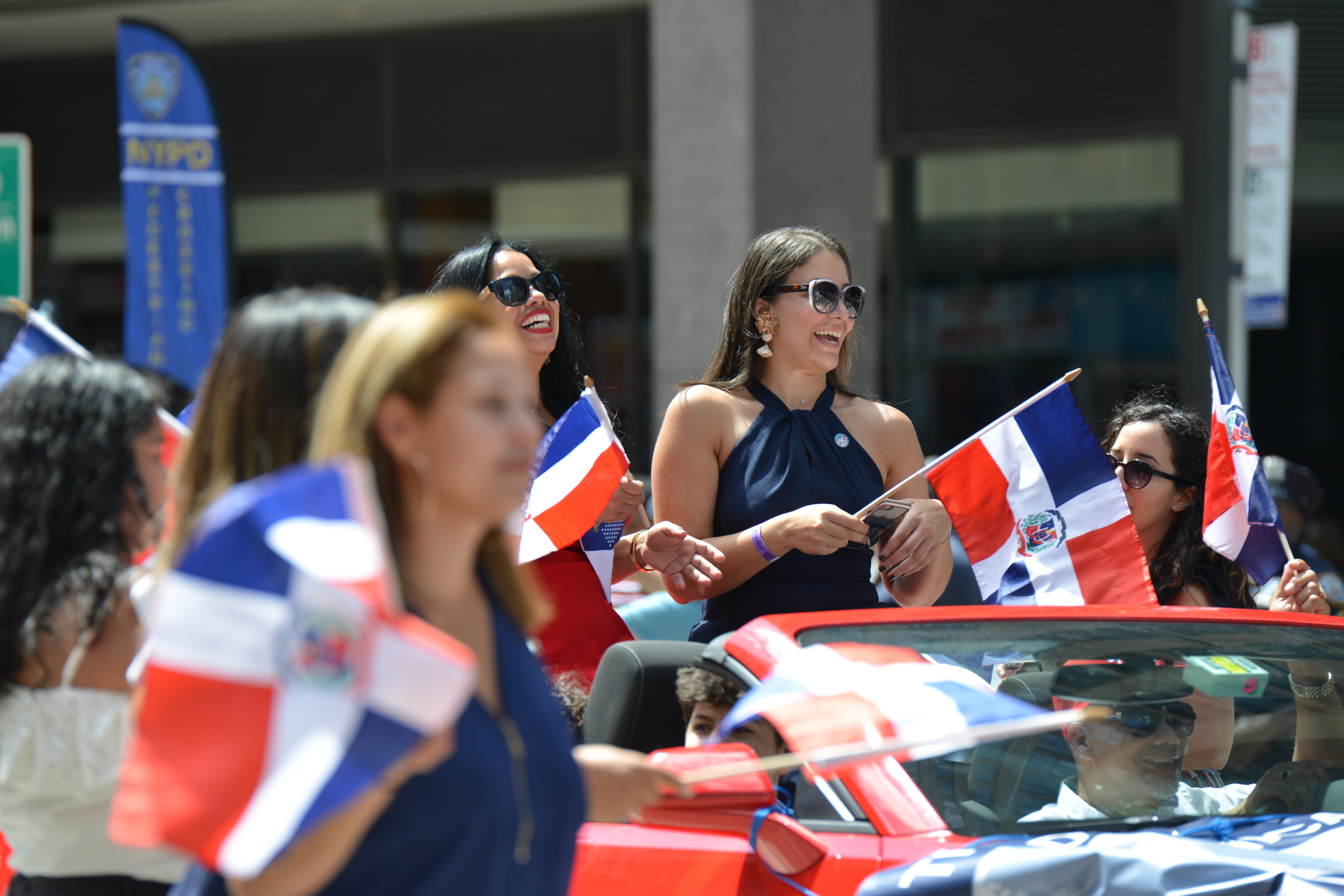
Dominicans in the Dominican Day Parade in New York City, 2019

The first of three late-20th century emigration waves began in 1961 after the assassination of dictator Trujillo, due to fear of retaliation by Trujillo's allies and political uncertainty in general. In 1965, the United States began a military occupation of the Dominican Republic to end a civil war. Upon this, the U.S. eased travel restrictions, making it easier for Dominicans to obtain U.S. visas. From 1966 to 1978, the exodus continued, fueled by high unemployment and political repression. Communities established by the first wave of immigrants to the U.S. created a network that assisted subsequent arrivals.

In the early 1980s, underemployment, inflation, and the rise in value of the dollar all contributed to a third wave of emigration from the Dominican Republic. Today, emigration from the Dominican Republic remains high. In 2012, there were approximately 1.7 million people of Dominican descent in the U.S., counting both native- and foreign-born. There was also a growing Dominican immigration to Puerto Rico, with nearly 70,000 Dominicans living there as of 2010. Although that number is slowly decreasing and immigration trends have reversed because of Puerto Rico's economic crisis as of 2016.

There is a significant Dominican population in Spain.

=== Education ===
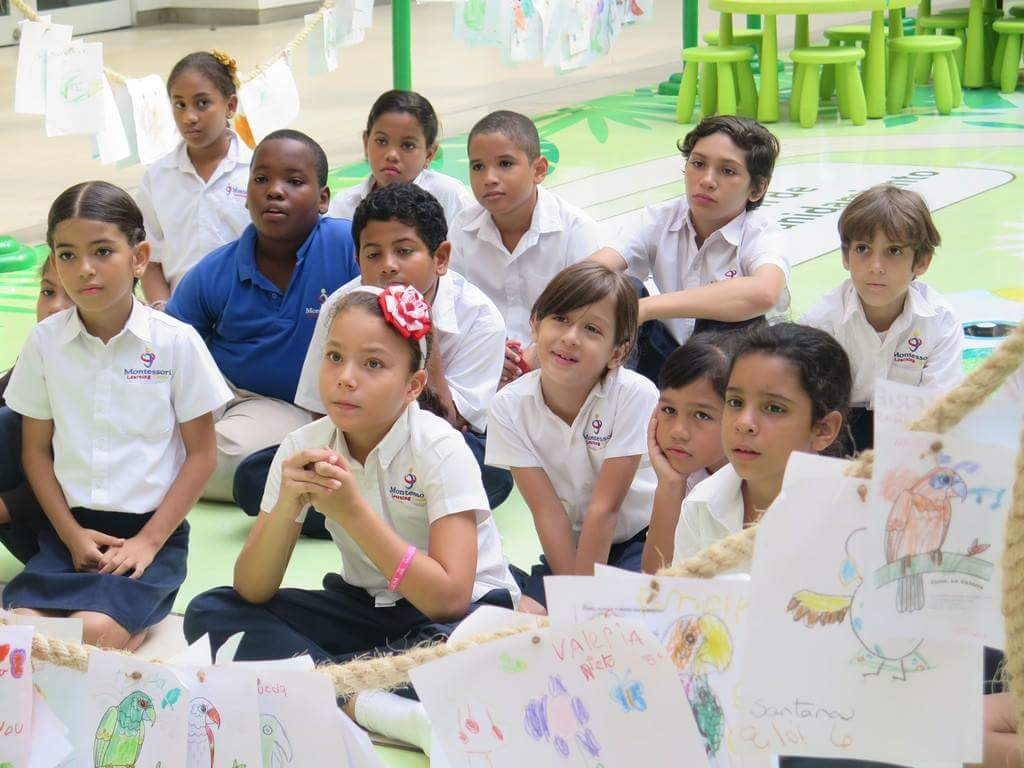
Kids taking classes

Primary education is regulated by the Ministry of Education, with education being a right of all citizens and youth in the Dominican Republic.

Preschool education is organized in different cycles and serves the 2–4 age group and the 4–6 age group. Preschool education is not mandatory except for the last year. Basic education is compulsory and serves the population of the 6–14 age group. Secondary education is not compulsory, although it is the duty of the state to offer it for free. It caters to the 14–18 age group and is organized in a common core of four years and three modes of two years of study that are offered in three different options: general or academic, vocational (industrial, agricultural, and services), and artistic.

The higher education system consists of institutes and universities. The institutes offer courses of a higher technical level. The universities offer technical careers, undergraduate and graduate; these are regulated by the Ministry of Higher Education, Science and Technology. The Dominican Republic was ranked 97th in the Global Innovation Index in 2025, down from 87th in 2019.

=== Health ===
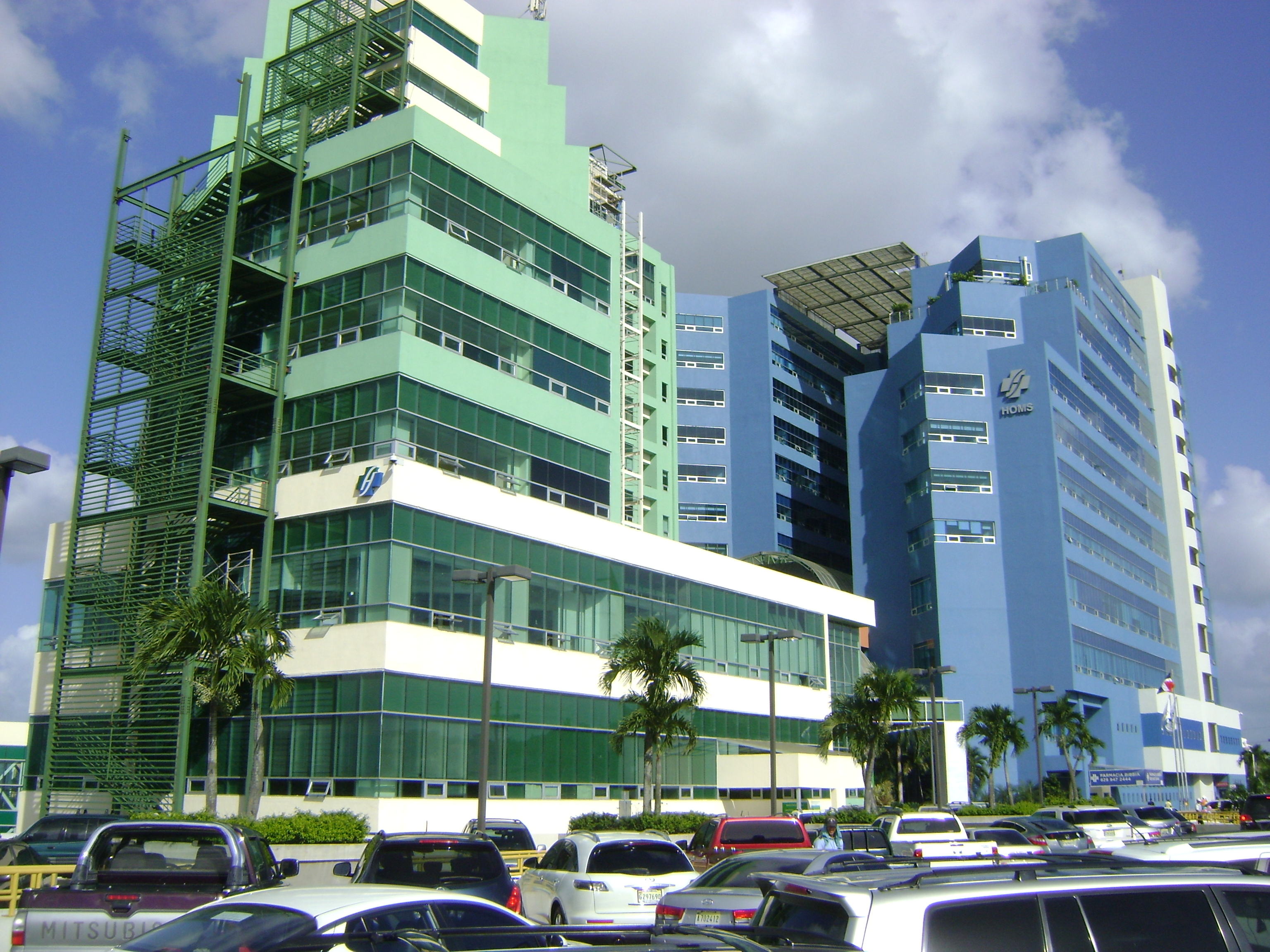
Hospital Metropolitano de Santiago is the largest hospital in the Dominican Republic.

In 2020, the Dominican Republic had an estimated birth rate of 18.5 per 1000 and a death rate of 6.3 per 1000.

In the 2024 Global Hunger Index (GHI), the Dominican Republic ranks 41st out of 127 countries with sufficient data. The Dominican Republic's GHI score is 7.8, which indicates a low level of hunger.

According to the WHO, the estimated incidence rate of tuberculosis (TB) in the Dominican Republic (42 cases per 100,000 people in 2023) is one of the highest in the Caribbean (after Haiti).

The Dominican Republic has a 0.9% prevalence rate of HIV/AIDS. Some urban areas of the Dominican Republic experience HIV/AIDS infection rates well in excess of 10%. In some parts of the Dominican Republic, HIV/AIDS has become one of the leading cause of death among teenagers and adults between 15–49 years old.

=== Crime ===
In 2012, the Dominican Republic had a murder rate of 22.1 per 100,000 population. There was a total of 2,268 murders in the Dominican Republic in 2012.

The Dominican Republic has become a trans-shipment point for Colombian drugs destined for Europe as well as the United States and Canada. Money-laundering via the Dominican Republic is favored by Colombian drug cartels for the ease of illicit financial transactions. In 2004, it was estimated that 8% of all cocaine smuggled into the United States had come through the Dominican Republic. The Dominican Republic responded with increased efforts to seize drug shipments, arrest and extradite those involved, and combat money-laundering.

The often-light treatment of violent criminals has been a continuous source of local controversy. In April 2010, five teenagers, aged 15 to 17, shot and killed two taxi drivers and killed another five by forcing them to drink drain-cleaning acid. On September 24, 2010, the teens were sentenced to prison terms of three to five years, despite the protests of the taxi drivers' families.

== Culture ==
Due to cultural syncretism, the culture and customs of the Dominican people have a European cultural basis, influenced by both African and native Taíno elements, although endogenous elements have emerged within Dominican culture; culturally the Dominican Republic is among the most-European countries in Spanish America, alongside Puerto Rico, Cuba, Central Chile, Argentina, and Uruguay. Spanish institutions in the colonial era were able to predominate in the Dominican culture's making-of as a relative success in the acculturation and cultural assimilation of African slaves slightly diminished African cultural influence in comparison to other Caribbean countries.

=== National symbols ===
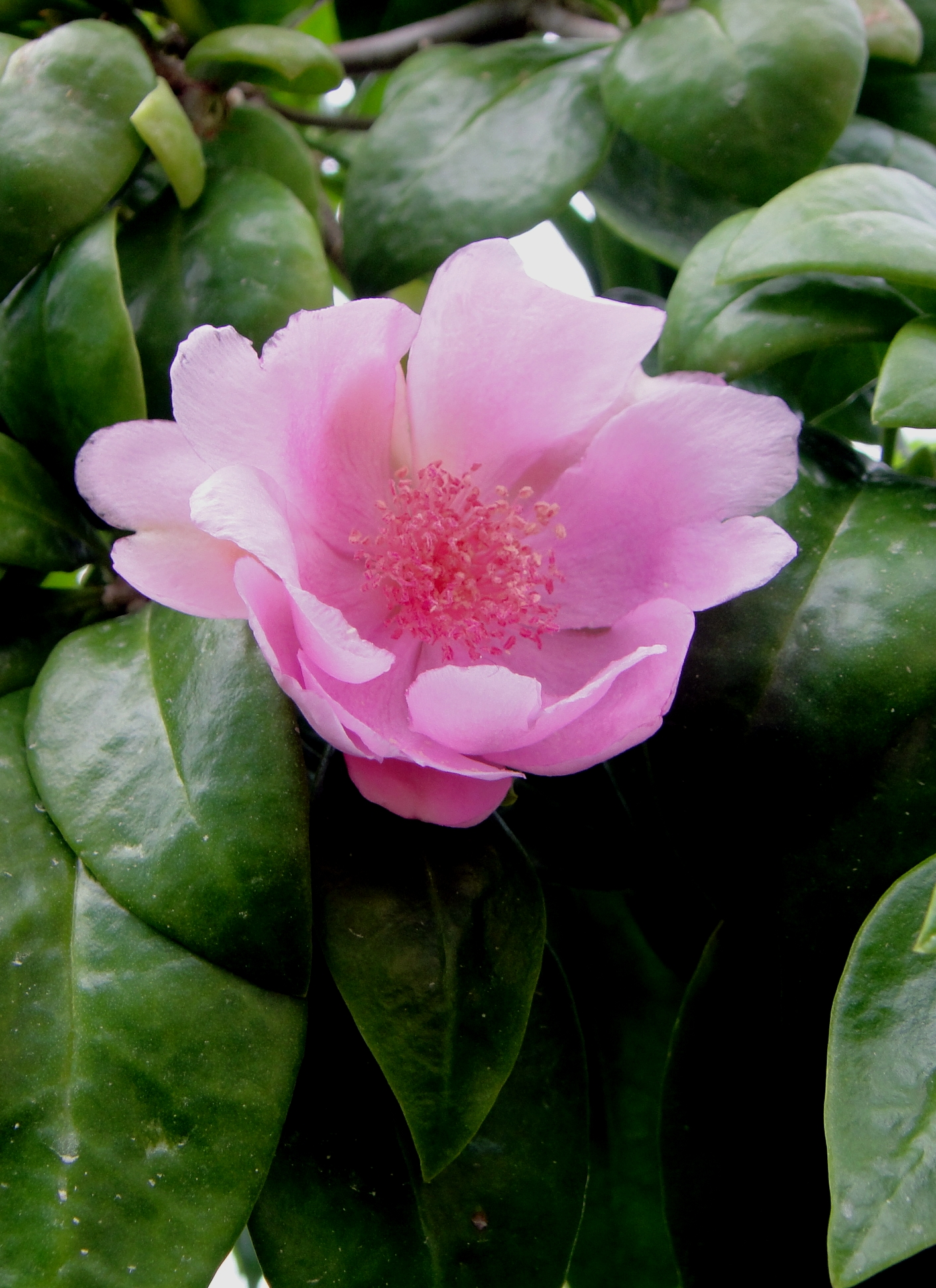
Bayahibe rose

Some of the Dominican Republic's important symbols are the flag, the coat of arms, and the national anthem, titled Himno Nacional. The flag has a large white cross that divides it into four quarters. Two quarters are red and two are blue. Red represents the blood shed by the liberators. Blue expresses God's protection over the nation. The white cross symbolizes the struggle of the liberators to bequeath future generations a free nation. An alternative interpretation is that blue represents the ideals of progress and liberty, whereas white symbolizes peace and unity among Dominicans.

In the center of the cross is the Dominican coat of arms, in the same colors as the national flag. The coat of arms pictures a red, white, and blue flag-draped shield with a Bible, a gold cross, and arrows; the shield is surrounded by an olive branch (on the left) and a palm branch (on the right). The Bible traditionally represents the truth and the light. The gold cross symbolizes the redemption from slavery, and the arrows symbolize the noble soldiers and their proud military. A blue ribbon above the shield reads, "Dios, Patria, Libertad" (meaning "God, Fatherland, Liberty"). A red ribbon under the shield reads, "República Dominicana" (meaning "Dominican Republic"). Out of all the flags in the world, the depiction of a Bible is unique to the Dominican flag.

The national flower is the endemic Bayahibe rose (Leuenbergeria quisqueyana) and the national tree is the West Indian mahogany (Swietenia mahagoni). The national bird is the cigua palmera or palmchat (Dulus dominicus), another endemic species.

The Dominican Republic celebrates Dia de la Altagracia on January 21 in honor of its patroness, Duarte's Day on January 26 in honor of one of its founding fathers, Independence Day on February 27, Restoration Day on August 16, Virgen de las Mercedes on September 24, and Constitution Day on November 6.

=== Architecture ===
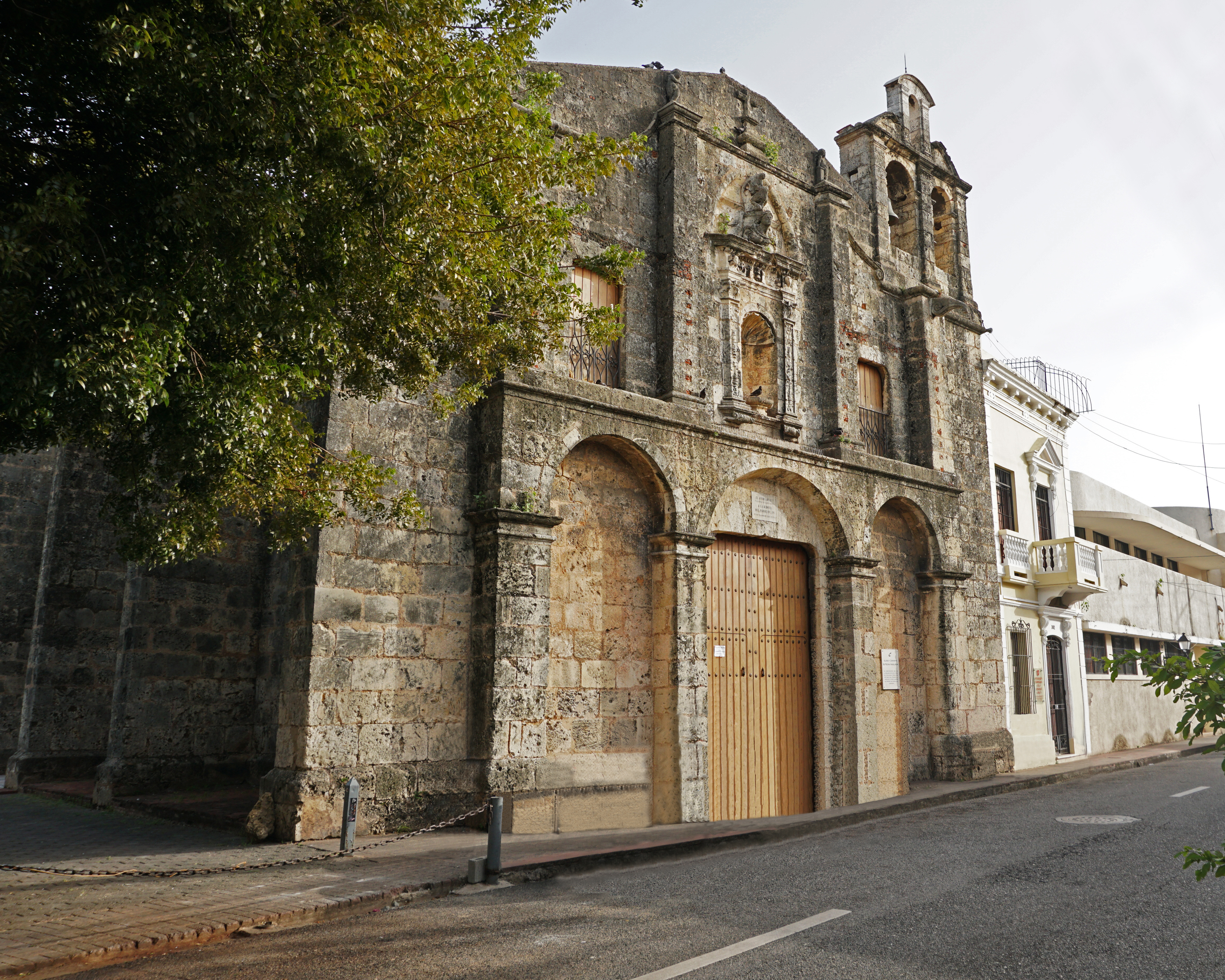
Church and Convent, Colonial Santo Domingo

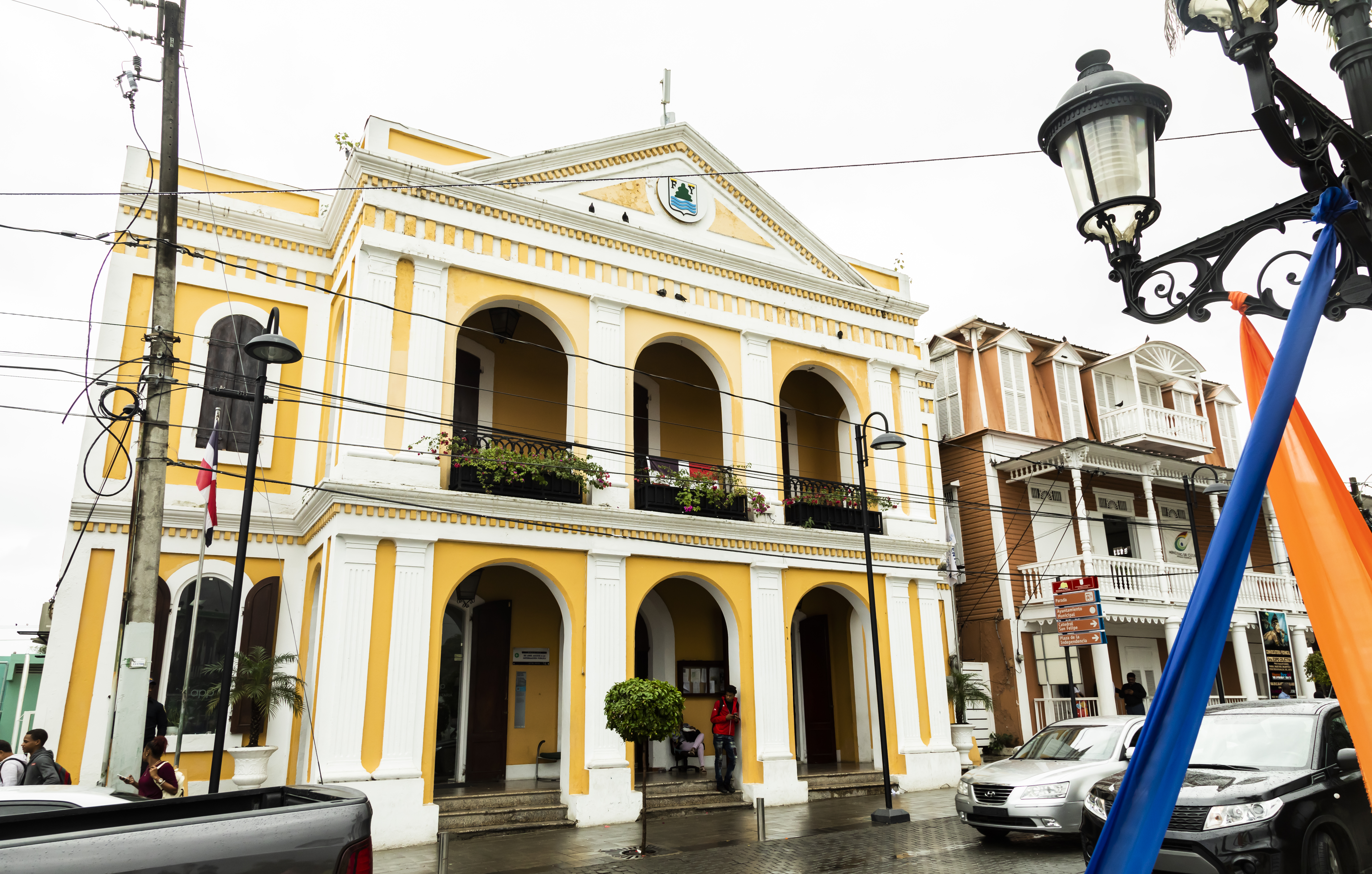
Late 19th-century Victorian architecture is prominent in Puerto Plata

The architecture in the Dominican Republic represents a complex blend of diverse cultures. The deep influence of the European colonists is the most evident throughout the country. Characterized by ornate designs and baroque structures, the style can best be seen in the capital city of Santo Domingo, which is home to the first cathedral, palace, monastery, and fortress in all of the Americas, located in the city's Colonial Zone, an area declared as a World Heritage Site by UNESCO. The designs carry over into the villas and buildings throughout the country. It can also be observed on buildings that contain stucco exteriors, arched doors and windows, and red tiled roofs.

The indigenous peoples of the Dominican Republic have also had a significant influence on the architecture of the country. The Taíno people relied heavily on the mahogany and guano (dried palm tree leaf) to put together crafts, artwork, furniture, and houses. Utilizing mud, thatched roofs, and mahogany trees, they gave buildings and the furniture inside a natural look, blending in with the island's surroundings.

Lately, with the rise in tourism and increasing popularity as a Caribbean vacation destination, architects in the Dominican Republic have now begun to incorporate cutting-edge designs that emphasize luxury. In many ways an architectural playground, villas and hotels implement new styles, while offering new takes on the old. This new style is characterized by simplified, angular corners and large windows that blend outdoor and indoor spaces.

=== Visual arts ===
Dominican art is perhaps most commonly associated with the bright, vibrant colors and images that are sold in every tourist gift shop across the country. However, the country has a long history of fine art that goes back to the middle of the 1800s when the country became independent and the beginnings of a national art scene emerged.

Historically, the painting of this time were centered around images connected to national independence, historical scenes, portraits but also landscapes and images of still life. Styles of painting ranged between neoclassicism and romanticism. Between 1920 and 1940 the art scene was influenced by styles of realism and impressionism. Dominican artists were focused on breaking from previous, academic styles in order to develop more independent and individual styles.

=== Literature ===
The Dominican politician, rector and author Andrés López de Medrano (1780 – May 6, 1856) became the first enlightened philosopher of the Dominican Republic and supported Dominican independence. Medrano is best known for writing one of the most important philosophical works of the 19th century, a treaty or guide entitled Logic, Elements of Modern Philosophy (1814), which became the first book of Dominican philosophy and the first book printed in the Dominican Republic.

The 20th century brought many prominent Dominican writers, and saw a general increase in the perception of Dominican literature. Writers such as Juan Bosch, Pedro Mir (national poet of the Dominican Republic), Aida Cartagena Portalatin, Emilio Rodríguez Demorizi (the most important Dominican historian, with more than 1000 written works), Manuel del Cabral (main Dominican poet featured in black poetry), Hector Inchustegui Cabral (considered one of the most prominent voices of the Caribbean social poetry of the twentieth century), Miguel Alfonseca (poet belonging to Generation 60), Rene del Risco (acclaimed poet who was a participant in the June 14 Movement), Mateo Morrison, among many more prolific authors, put the island in one of the most important in Literature in the twentieth century.

New Dominican writers have not yet achieved the renown of their 20th-century counterparts. However, writers such as Frank Báez (won the 2006 Santo Domingo Book Fair First Prize) and Junot Díaz (2008 Pulitzer Prize for Fiction for his novel The Brief Wondrous Life of Oscar Wao) lead Dominican literature in the 21st century.

=== Music and dance ===
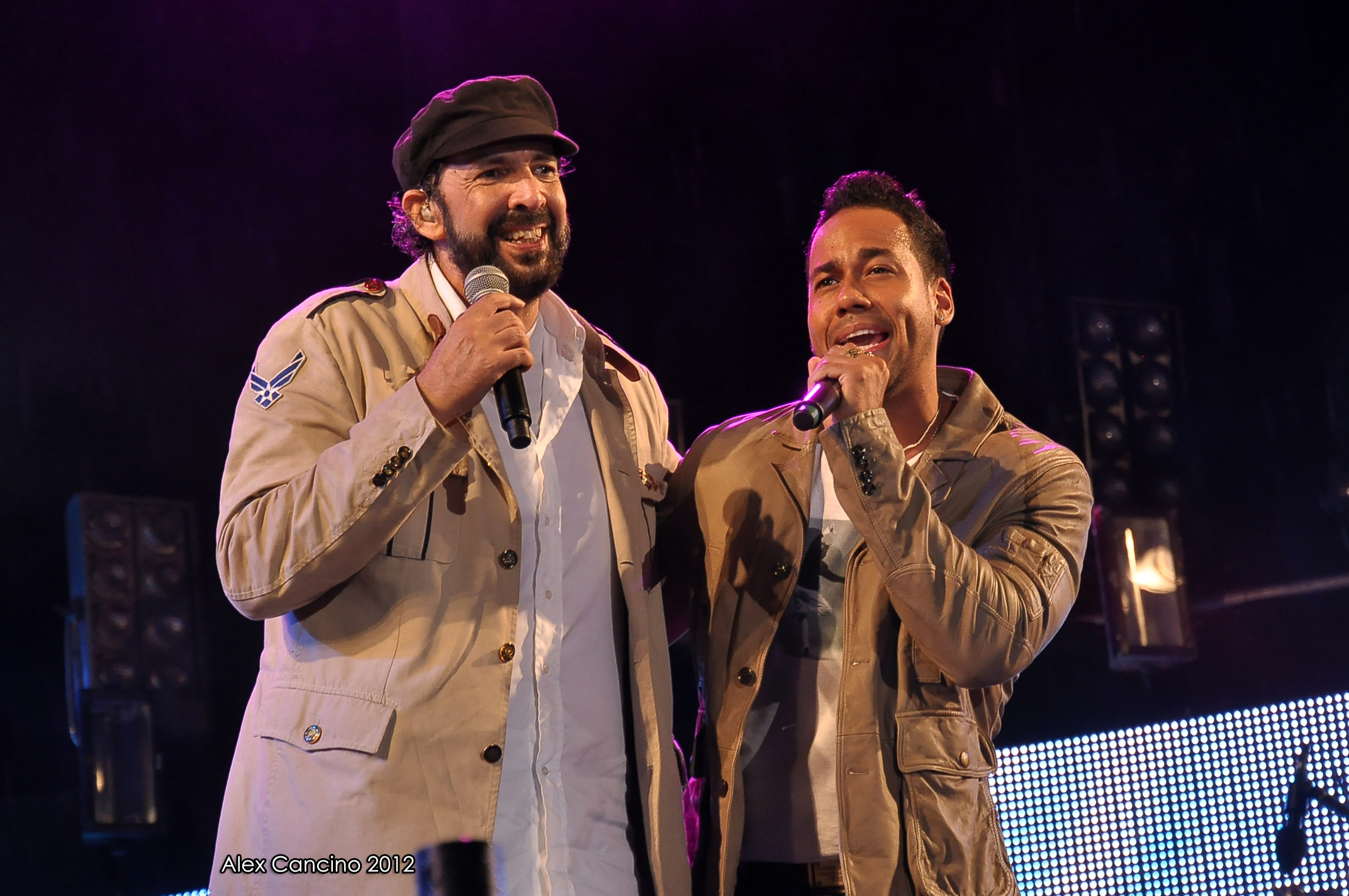
Merengue, sung by Juan Luis Guerra (left), and bachata, sung by Romeo Santos (right), are two very popular music genres native to the Dominican Republic.

Musically, the Dominican Republic is known for the world popular musical style and genre called merengue, a type of lively, fast-paced rhythm and dance music consisting of a tempo of about 120 to 160 beats per minute (though it varies) based on musical elements like drums, brass, chorded instruments, and accordion, as well as some elements unique to the Spanish-speaking Caribbean, such as the tambora and güira.

Its syncopated beats use Latin percussion, brass instruments, bass, and piano or keyboard. Between 1937 and 1950 merengue music was promoted internationally by Dominican groups like Billo's Caracas Boys, Chapuseaux and Damiron "Los Reyes del Merengue", Joseito Mateo, and others. Radio, television, and international media popularized it further. Some well known merengue performers are Wilfrido Vargas, Johnny Ventura, singer-songwriter Los Hermanos Rosario, Juan Luis Guerra, Fernando Villalona, Eddy Herrera, Sergio Vargas, Toño Rosario, Milly Quezada, and Chichí Peralta.

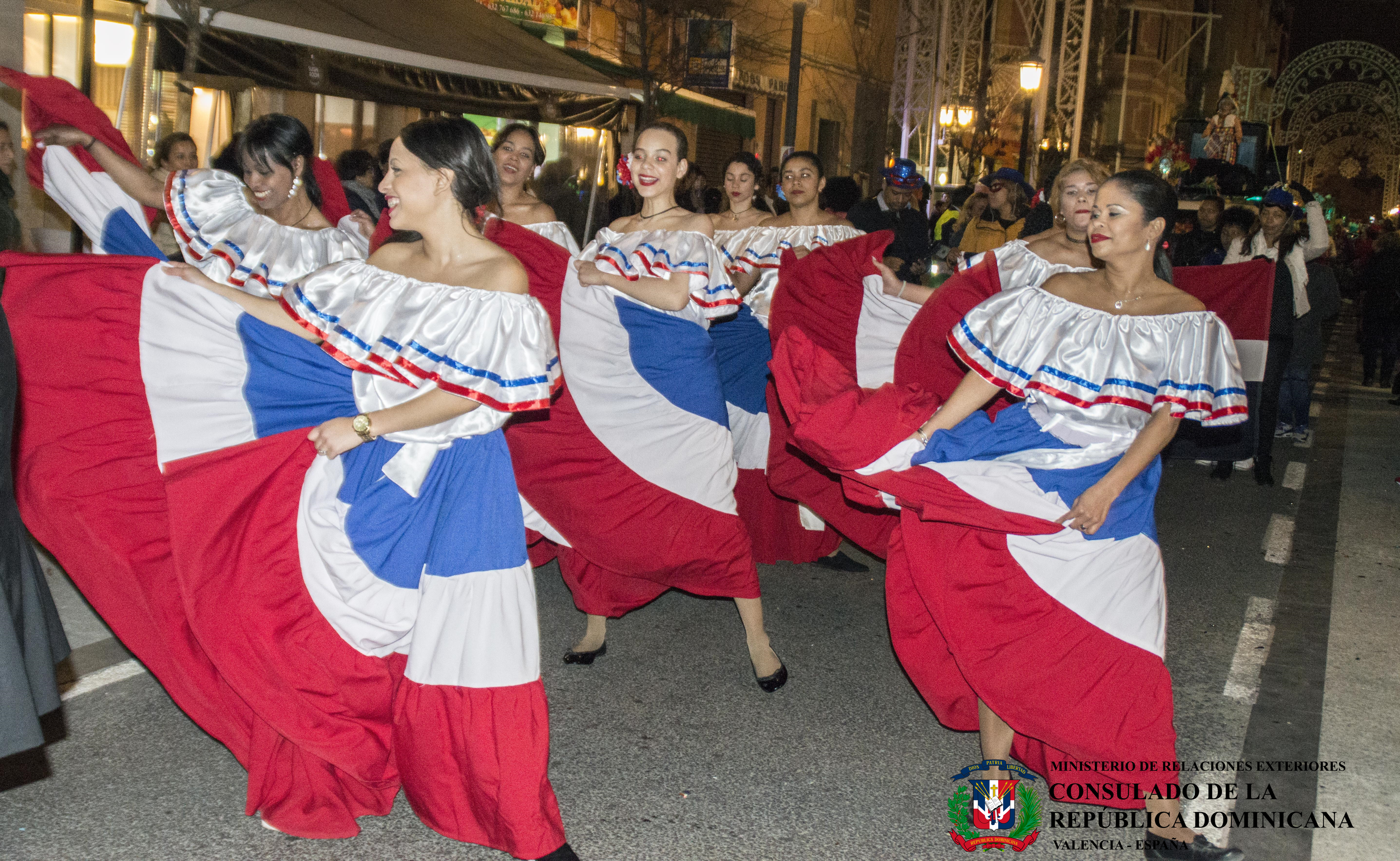
Dominicans dancing in parade with traditional dress

Bachata, a form of music and dance that originated in the countryside and rural marginal neighborhoods of the Dominican Republic, has become quite popular in recent years. Its subjects are often romantic; especially prevalent are tales of heartbreak and sadness. In fact, the original name for the genre was amargue ("bitterness", or "bitter music"), until the rather ambiguous (and mood-neutral) term bachata became popular. Bachata grew out of, and is still closely related to, the pan-Latin American romantic style called bolero. Over time, it has been influenced by merengue and by a variety of Latin American guitar styles.

Palo is an Afro-Dominican sacred music that can be found throughout the island. The drum and human voice are the principal instruments. Palo is played at religious ceremonies—usually coinciding with saints' religious feast days—as well as for secular parties and special occasions. Its roots are in the Congo region of central-west Africa, but it is mixed with European influences in the melodies.

Salsa music has had a great deal of popularity in the country. During the late 1960s Dominican musicians like Johnny Pacheco, creator of the Fania All Stars, played a significant role in the development and popularization of the genre.

Dominican rock and Reggaeton are also popular. Many, if not the majority, of its performers are based in Santo Domingo and Santiago.

=== Fashion ===
The country boasts one of the ten most important design schools in the region, La Escuela de Diseño de Altos de Chavón, which is making the country a key player in the world of fashion and design. Noted fashion designer Oscar de la Renta was born in the Dominican Republic in 1932, and became a US citizen in 1971. By 1963, he had designs bearing his own label. After establishing himself in the US, de la Renta opened boutiques across the country. His work blends French and Spaniard fashion with American styles. Although he settled in New York, de la Renta also marketed his work in Latin America, where it became very popular, and remained active in his native Dominican Republic, where his charitable activities and personal achievements earned him the Juan Pablo Duarte Order of Merit and the Order of Cristóbal Colón. De la Renta died of complications from cancer on October 20, 2014.

=== Cuisine ===
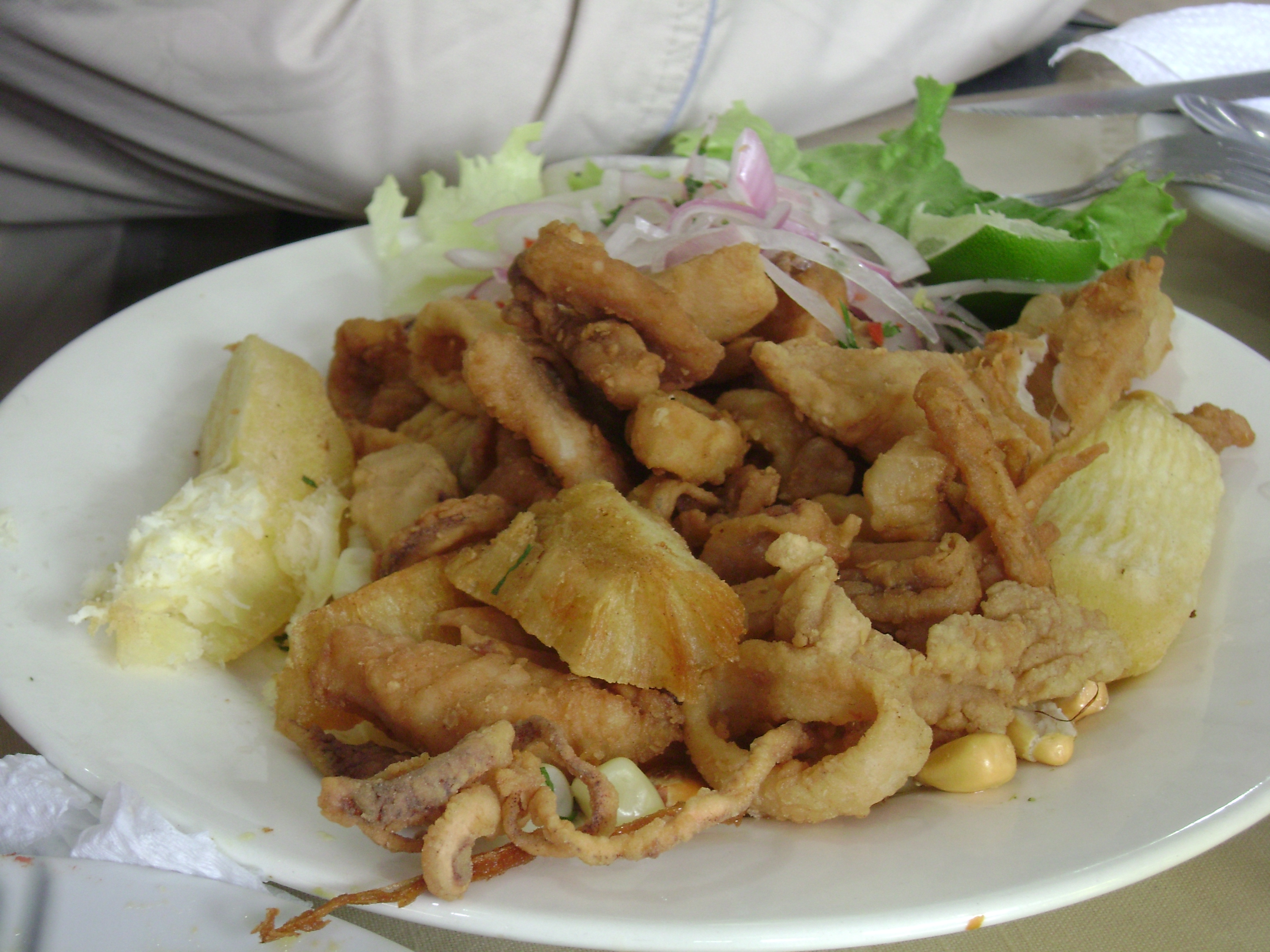
Chicharrón mixto, a common dish in the country derived from Andalusia in southern Spain

Dominican cuisine is predominantly Spanish, Taíno, and African in origin. The typical cuisine is similar to what can be found in other Latin American countries. One breakfast dish consists of eggs and mangú (mashed, boiled plantain). Heartier versions of mangú are accompanied by deep-fried meat (Dominican salami, typically), cheese, or both. Lunch, generally the largest and most important meal of the day, usually consists of rice, meat, beans, and salad. "La Bandera" (literally "The Flag") is the most popular lunch dish; it consists of meat and red beans on white rice. Sancocho is a stew often made with seven varieties of meat.

Meals tend to favor meats and starches over dairy products and vegetables. Many dishes are made with sofrito, which is a mix of local herbs used as a wet rub for meats and sautéed to bring out all of a dish's flavors. Throughout the south-central coast, bulgur, or whole wheat, is a main ingredient in quipes or tipili (bulgur salad). Other favorite Dominican foods include chicharrón, yuca, casabe, pastelitos (empanadas), batata, ñame, pasteles en hoja, chimichurris, and tostones.

Some treats Dominicans enjoy are arroz con leche (or arroz con dulce), bizcocho dominicano (lit. 'Dominican cake'), habichuelas con dulce, flan, frío frío (snow cones), dulce de leche, and caña (sugarcane). The beverages Dominicans enjoy are Morir Soñando, rum, beer, Mama Juana, batidas (smoothie), jugos naturales (freshly squeezed fruit juices), mabí, coffee, and chaca (also called maiz caqueao/casqueado, maiz con dulce and maiz con leche), the last item being found only in the southern provinces of the country such as San Juan.

In 2018 and 2019, Santo Domingo was named a Culinary Capital of the Caribbean by the Ibero-American Academy of Gastronomy.

=== Sports ===
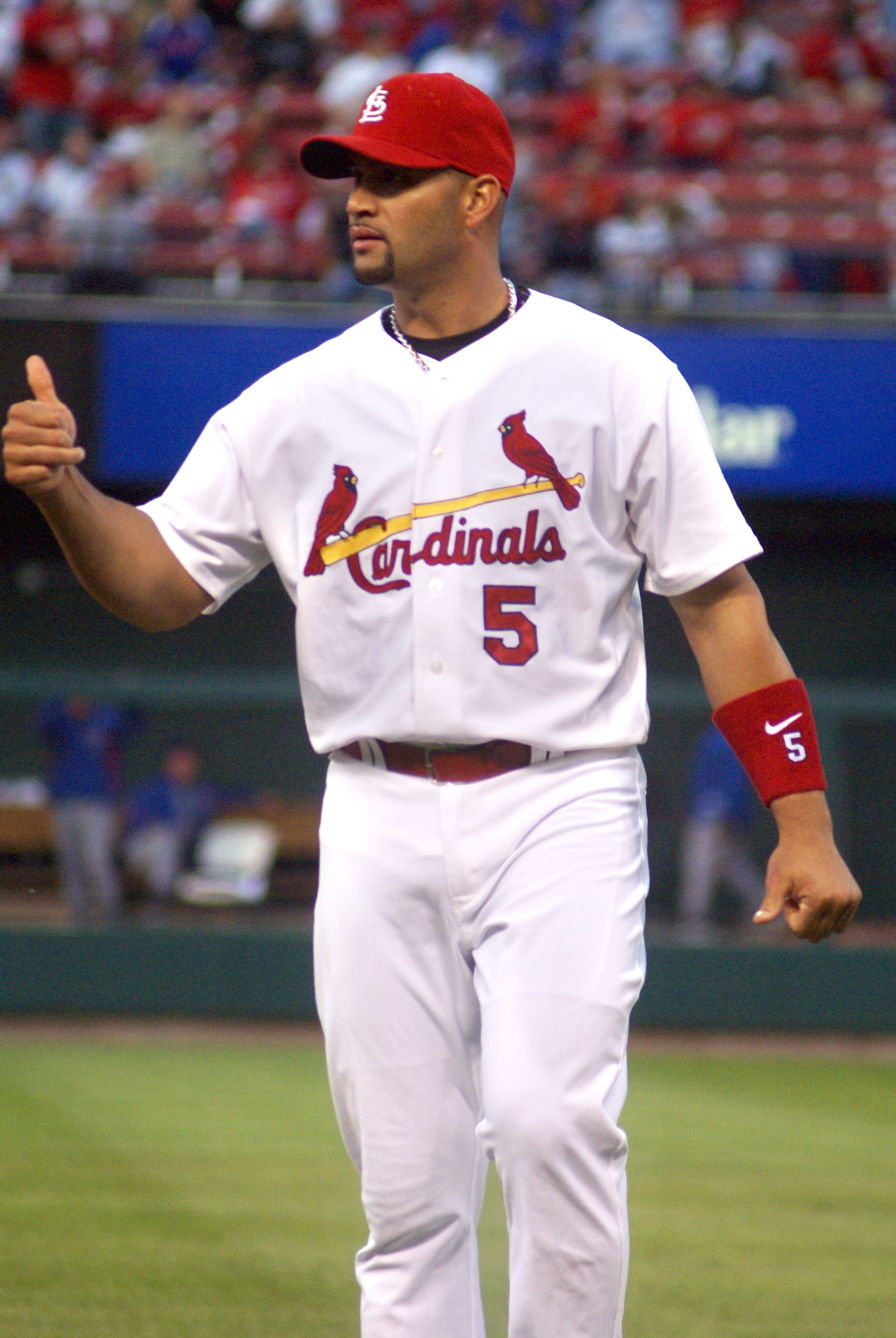
Dominican native and Major League Baseball player Albert Pujols

Baseball is by far the most popular sport in the Dominican Republic. The Dominican Professional Baseball League consists of six teams. Its season usually begins in October and ends in January. After the United States, the Dominican Republic has the second-highest number of Major League Baseball (MLB) players. Ozzie Virgil Sr. became the first Dominican-born player in MLB on September 23, 1956. As of 2024, five Dominican-born players—Adrián Beltré, Vladimir Guerrero, Juan Marichal, Pedro Martínez, and David Ortiz—have been elected to the Baseball Hall of Fame. Other notable baseball players born in the Dominican Republic are José Bautista, Robinson Canó, Rico Carty, Bartolo Colón, Nelson Cruz, Edwin Encarnación, Cristian Javier, Ubaldo Jiménez, Francisco Liriano, Plácido Polanco, Albert Pujols, Hanley Ramírez, José Ramírez, Manny Ramírez, José Reyes, Alfonso Soriano, Sammy Sosa, Juan Soto, Fernando Tatís Jr., Miguel Tejada, Framber Valdez, and Elly De La Cruz. Felipe Alou has also enjoyed success as a manager and Omar Minaya as a general manager. In 2013, the Dominican team went undefeated en route to winning the World Baseball Classic.

In boxing, the country has produced scores of world-class fighters and several world champions, such as Carlos Cruz, his brother Leo, Juan Guzman, and Joan Guzman.

Basketball also enjoys a relatively high level of popularity. Tito Horford, his son Al, Felipe Lopez, and Francisco Garcia are among the Dominican-born players currently or formerly in the National Basketball Association (NBA).

Olympic gold medalist and world champion hurdler Félix Sánchez hails from the Dominican Republic, as do former NFL defensive end Luis Castillo and 2020 World and European Cyclo-cross champion Ceylin del Carmen Alvarado.

Other important sports are volleyball, introduced in 1916 by U.S. Marines and controlled by the Dominican Volleyball Federation, taekwondo, in which Gabriel Mercedes won an Olympic silver medal in 2008, and judo.

== See also ==
- Dominican diaspora
- List of islands of the Dominican Republic
- Outline of the Dominican Republic
