= Miss Grand Dominican Republic =

National beauty contest in Dominican Republic

- Formation: 5 July 2016; 10 years ago
- Founder: Chantel Martinez
- Type: Beauty pageant
- Headquarters: Santo Domingo
- Location: Dominican Republic
- Members: Miss Grand International
- Official language: English and Spanish
- National Directors: Alejandro Martínez; Jorge Cruz
- Parent organization: Misses of Dominican Republic (2019–2021, 2023–present)

Miss Grand Dominican Rep.
licensees timeline

Stand-alone pageant
Appointed titleholder
Under another pageant

Miss Grand Dominican Republic (Spanish: Miss Grand República Dominicana) is a female national beauty pageant in the Dominican Republic, founded in 2016 by a Dominican American business person, Chantel Martinez, with the aim of selecting a country representative to participate in its parent pageant, Miss Grand International. After Chantel Martinez ended the partnership with the Miss Grand International in 2019, the competition franchise was taken over by different local organizers, such as the Iconic Model Search Inc. of Joe Amhed (2022) and Misses of Dominican Republic-related personnel (2019–2021, 2023).

Since the first participation in 2013, the Dominican Republic won the Miss Grand International competition once in 2015, through a Rhode Island–based model, Anea Garcia, but was later replaced by the first runner-up from Australia, Claire Parker, due to being unable to fulfill the agreement with the international organizer.

== History ==
Since the first participation of the Dominican Republic in Miss Grand International in 2013, the national pageant that was specifically held for the said international stage happened only once in 2016, under the leadership of Chantel Martinez, the first runner-up Miss Grand International 2013, who served as the national director of Miss Grand Dominican Republic from 2014 to 2018. Contestants from 20 provinces and municipalities participated in the competition held on July 5 at the Cibao Grand Theatre in Santiago de los Caballeros, in which Lucero Arias, a fashion model from Dajabón, was announced the winner, but she got a non-placement after participating at Miss Grand International 2016 in Las Vegas, United States. Since no other edition of such a national contest has been additionally held, all the ensuing representatives were either appointed or gained the right from other contests; for instance, the winners or runners-up of the Misses of Dominican Republic pageant were designated as Miss Grand Dominican Republic in 2020 and 2021.

The Dominican Republic got the placements in Miss Grand International seven times, the best rank was the winner in 2015, won by a Dominican American from Rhode Island, Anea García, but was later dethroned in early 2016 and the first runner-up from Australia was promoted to take over the title.

== Editions ==
=== Location and date ===
Edition	Date	Final venue	Entrants	Ref.
1st	5 July 2016	Cibao Grand Theatre, Santiago de los Caballeros	20	
2nd	15 August 2023	Cibao Grand Theatre, Santiago de los Caballeros	18	
3rd	3 May 2025	Teatro La Fiesta, Hotel Jaragua, Santo Domingo	28	
4th	18 July 2026	Cibao Grand Theatre, Santiago de los Caballeros	31	

=== Competition result ===
Edition	Winner	Runners-up					Ref.
Edition	Winner	First	Second	Third	Fourth	Fifth	Ref.
1st	Lucero Arias (Dajabón)	Laura Cruz (Dom. commu. in USA)	Reisy Sobrino (Santo Domingo Oeste)	Not awarded			
2nd	Skarxi Marie (Santiago)	Ashly Santos (La Vega)	Andreina Santos (Dom. commu. in USA)	Pilar Ortega (Puerto Plata)	Asia Ciaffarafa (Distrito Nacional)	Blainery Puello (San Cristóbal)	
3rd	Madelyn Mejía (Peravia)	Anna Alvarado (Hermanas Mirabal)	Keitty Familia (Monte Plata)	Diana Laiz (Puerto Plata)	Annerys López (Santo Domingo Norte)	Not awarded	
4th	Keitty Familia (Monte Plata)	Eda Caraballo (Santiago Province)	Nahomi Castillo (Santo Domingo Este)	Virginia Angola (Punta Cana)	Crismar Echavarría (Dom. commu. in USA)	Yaribel Maldonado (Note: Contestants represent the Dominican Republic at MGI All Stars 2nd Edition) (Dom. commu. in Alemenia)	

== International competition ==
The following is a list of Dominican representatives at the Miss Grand International contest.

Color keys

- : Declared as the winner
- : Ended as a runner-up (Top 5)
- : Ended as a finalist (Top 10)
- : Ended as a semifinalist (Top 20/21)
- : Ended as special awards winner

Year	Miss Grand Dominican Republic	Title	Placement	Special Awards	National Director
2026	Keitty Familia	Miss Grand Dominican Republic 2026	Unplaced		Alejandro Martínez & Jorge Cruz
2025	Madelyn Mejìa	Miss Grand Dominican Republic 2025	Top 22		Alejandro Martínez & Jorge Cruz
2024	Maria Felix	Appointed	4th Runner-up (Note: Originally named the 5th Runner-up, but was later promoted to the 4th Runner-up following the dethronement and resignation of several 2024 top 5 finalists.)		Alejandro Martínez & Jorge Cruz
2023	Skarxi Marie	Miss Grand Dominican Republic 2023	5th Runner-up	Best in Swimsuit	Alejandro Martínez & Jorge Cruz
2022	Jearmanda Ramos	Appointed	Top 20		Joe Amhed
2021	Stephanie Medina	Miss Grand Dominican Republic 2021 (Note: Main title in Misses of Dominican Republic 2021 pageant)	Top 20		Alejandro Martínez
2020	Lady León	Miss Asia Pacific Dominicana 2020 (Note: Supplemental title in Misses of Dominican Republic 2020 pageant)	Top 20		Jose Alejandro & Chris E. Puesan
2019	Stéphanie Bustamante	Miss International Dominicana 2018 (Note: Supplemental title in Miss Mundo Dominicana 2018 pageant)	Top 20		Jose Alejandro & Chris E. Puesan
2018	Mayté Brito	2nd Runner-up Miss Mundo Dominicana 2014	Top 10		Chantel Martínez
2017	Sarahai Reyes	Appointed	Unplaced		Chantel Martínez
2017	Leidy Guzman	4th Runner-up Miss Grand United States 2017	Did not compete		Chantel Martínez
2016	Lucero Arias	Miss Grand Dominican Republic 2016	Unplaced		Chantel Martínez
2015	Anea Garcia	2nd Runner-up Miss USA 2015	Winner (Note: Later dethroned)		Chantel Martínez
2014	Germania Martínez	Appointed	Unplaced		Chantel Martínez
2014	Moesha Henriquez	2nd Runner-up Miss Santiago 2014	Did not compete		Chantel Martínez
2013	Chantel Martínez	5th Runner-up Miss Dominican Republic 2013	1st Runner-up	Best Evening Gown	Magali Febles
2013	Irina Peguero	Miss Dominican Republic 2013 finalist	Did not compete		Magali Febles

== Winner gallery ==
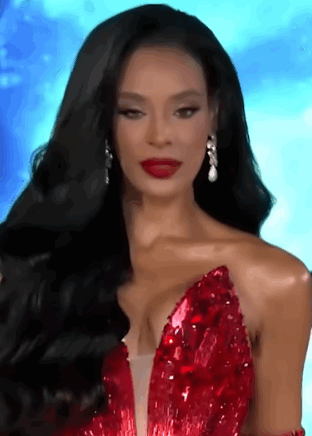
Miss Grand Dominican Republic 2025
Madelyn Mejía

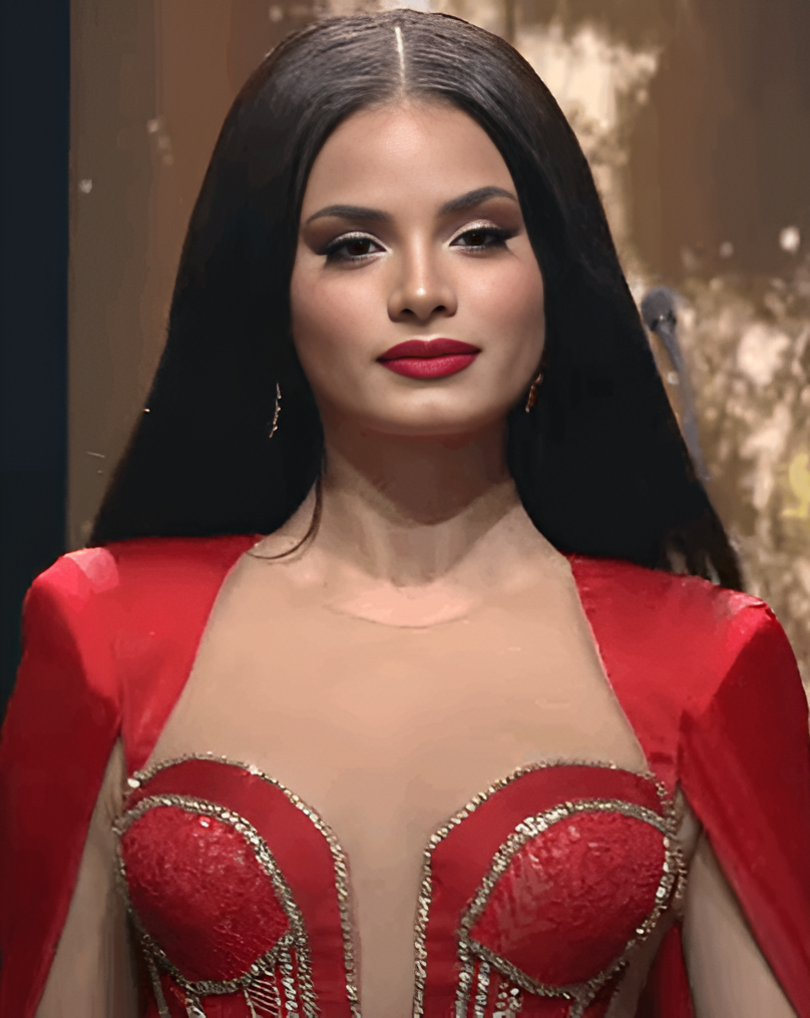
Miss Grand Dominican Republic 2024
Maria Felix

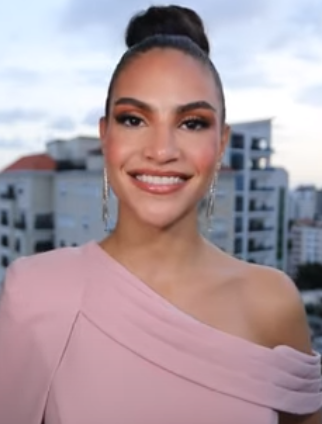
Miss Grand Dominican Republic 2023
Skarxi Marte

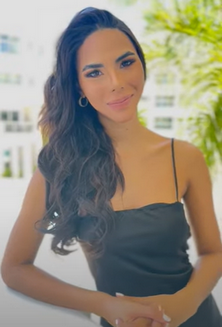
Miss Grand Dominican Republic 2022
Jearmanda Ramos

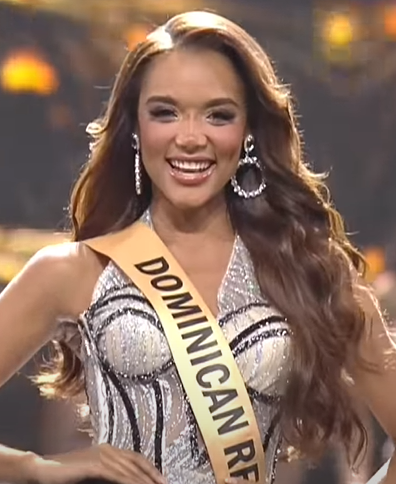
Miss Grand Dominican Republic 2021
Stephanie Medina

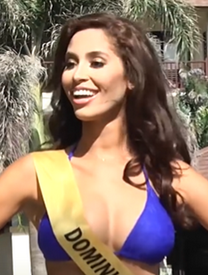
Miss Grand Dominican Republic 2015
Anea Garcia

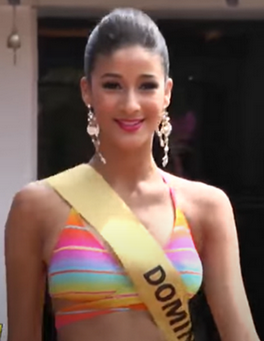
Miss Grand Dominican Republic 2014
Germanía Martínez

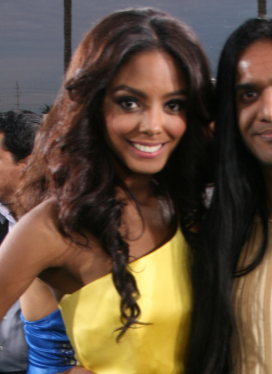
Miss Grand Dominican Republic 2013
Chantel Martínez

== National pageant candidates ==
=== Participating regional and territories representatives ===
Regional/territories	1st	2nd	3rd	4th
Altamira Puerto Plata			10	Y
Azua		13	Y	
Baní			10	20
Barahona	Y		Y	
Boca Chica				Y
Cabarete				Y
Com. Dom. en Alemania				
Com. Dom. en Italia				20
Com. Dom. en USA			17	
Constanza			Y	
Costamber Puerto Plata				20
Dajabón				20
Distrito Nacional			10	20
Duarte	Y	13		
Espaillat	12		17	20
Hermanas Mirabal	12	13		Y
Imbert Puerto Plata				Y
Jarabacoa	12		17	
La Altagracia	12		Y	10
La Romana		13	Y	20
La Vega	6		Y	20
María Trinidad Sánchez				10
Monseñor Nouel	12			Y
Monte Cristi	Y			
Monte Plata				
Peravia	12	13		Y
Puerto Plata	6			Y
Punta Cana			Y	
Samaná	Y	Y	10	Y
San Cristóbal			Y	
San Francisco de Macorís		Y		
San Juan			Y	20
San Pedro de Macorís			17	
Santiago	Y		17	
Santiago de Los Caballeros				10
Santiago Oeste		13	Y	Y
Santiago Rodriguez	Y	Y	Y	
Santo Domingo	6	Y		20
Santo Domingo Este	Y		17	
Santo Domingo Norte				Y
Santo Domingo Oeste		Y	10	Y
Sosúa				Y
Tamboril		Y		10
Valverde	Y	13	17	
Villa Altagracia				Y
Total	20	18	28	31
Color keys: : Declared as the winner; : Ended as a 1st runner-up; : Ended as a 2nd runner-up; : Ended as a 3rd runner-up; : Ended as a 4th runner-up; : Ended as a 5th runner-up; A : Ended as a finalist, semifinalist and unplaced; × : Ended as withdrew during the competition; × : Ended as no representative
