= Miss Dominican Republic 2014 =

- Date: August 17, 2014
- Presenters: Luz García; Georgina Duluc
- Entertainment: El Cata; Janio; Divas by Jiménez; Aura
- Venue: Teatro Nacional Eduardo Brito, Santo Domingo, Dominican Republic
- Broadcaster: Telesistema Canal 11 (Dominican Republic); Televisión Dominicana (U.S.)
- Entrants: 33
- Placements: 15
- Debuts: Mexico; Punta Cana; Salcedo
- Withdrawals: Barahona; Puerto Rico; Guayacanes; Las Matas de Farfán; María Trinidad Sánchez; Sánchez Ramírez
- Returns: Bahoruco; Higüey; La Vega; San Cristóbal; San José de Ocoa; San Pedro de Macorís
- Winner: Kimberly Castillo; Higüey
- Congeniality: Leibys Pujols; San José de Ocoa
- Best National Costume: Aletxa Mueses; Santiago
- Photogenic: Dhío Moreno; Mexico

Miss Dominican Republic 2014 was the 63rd Miss Dominican Republic pageant, held at the Teatro Nacional Eduardo Brito in Santo Domingo, Dominican Republic, on August 17, 2014.

Yaritza Reyes crowned Kimberly Castillo of Higüey as her successor at the end of the event. Castillo represented the Dominican Republic at Miss Universe 2014.

The 1st Runner-Up competed in Reina Hispanoamericana 2014, the 2nd Runner-Up competed in Miss Intercontinental 2014, the 3rd Runner-Up competed in Miss Model of the World 2014, and the 4th Runner-Up competed in Miss Globe International 2014. Miss Universe 2013, Gabriela Isler assisted in the crowning of Miss Dominican Republic 2014.

== Results ==
=== Placements ===
Placement	Contestant
Miss Dominican Republic 2014	Higüey – Kimberly Altagracia Castillo
1st Runner-Up	Santiago – Aletxa Marie Mueses
2nd Runner-Up	Mexico – Dhíoversy Angélica Moreno
3rd Runner-Up	Distrito Nacional – María del Mar López
4th Runner-Up	Punta Cana – Analíz Victoria de la Cruz
Top 10	Peravia – Nathalie Elise Troncoso; Monte Plata – Ysabel Reyes de la Cruz; Santo Domingo Este – Denisse Peña; Hermanas Mirabal – Catherine Sánchez; Estados Unidos – Thatiana Díaz
Top 15	Azua – Dorimi Pineda §; Independencia – Marilyn Ramírez-Canaán; San Cristóbal – Mariela Silvia Corporán; San José de Ocoa – Leibys Franshesca Pujols Quéliz; San Pedro de Macorís – Marcell Anaïs Saleme Padilla

§ – Won the 15th Semifinalist spot through online voting.

== Contestants ==
Province	Contestant	Age	Height	Hometown
Azua	Dorimi Altagracia Pineda Santana	21	1.75 m (5 ft 9 in)	Azua de Compostela
Bahoruco	Magdelin Rosalía Gomera Padrón	20	1.68 m (5 ft 6 in)	Neiba
Comunidad Dominicana En Estados Unidos	Thatiana Katherine Díaz Burgos	21	1.74 m (5 ft 8 1/2 in)	New York City
Comunidad Dominicana En México	Dhíoversy Angélica Moreno Romero	24	1.86 m (6 ft 1 in)	Mexico City
Distrito Nacional	María del Mar López Bonnelly	19	1.71 m (5 ft 7 1/2 in)	Santo Domingo
Duarte	Sony Anyelí Cruz Maldonado	23	1.74 m (5 ft 8 1/2 in)	San Francisco de Macorís
Elías Piña	Mary Lenny de los Santos Ynoa	22	1.69 m (5 ft 6 1/2 in)	Comendador
Espaillat	Luz María Reinoso Suárez	23	1.71 m (5 ft 7 1/2 in)	Moca
Hato Mayor	Lines Andrea Díaz Santana	21	1.82 m (5 ft 11 1/2 in)	Hato Mayor del Rey
Hermanas Mirabal	Catherine Lorena Sánchez Calderón	24	1.66 m (5 ft 5 1/2 in)	Salcedo
Higüey	Kimberly Altagracia Castillo Mota	25	1.84 m (6 ft 1/2 in)	Salvaleón de Higüey
Independencia	Marilyn Encarnación Ramírez-Canaán	19	1.85 m (6 ft 1 in)	La Descubierta
La Altagracia	Katherine Eugenia Peña Báez	18	1.81 m (5 ft 11 1/2 in)	Salvaleón de Higüey
La Romana	Martha Elicia Montero Matos	21	1.84 m (6 ft 1/2 in)	La Romana
La Vega	Raquel del Pilar Díaz Báez	21	1.79 m (5 ft 10 1/2 in)	Constanza
Monseñor Nouel	Alexandra María Humeau Álvarez	20	1.75 m (5 ft 9 in)	Bonao
Monte Cristi	Gailer Mabel García Abreu	18	1.67 m (5 ft 5 1/2 in)	Castañuela
Monte Plata	Juana Ysabel Reyes de la Cruz	25	1.78 m (5 ft 10 in)	Monte Plata
Pedernales	Kiovanny Robinson Yermenos	20	1.68 m (5 ft 6 in)	Pedernales
Peravia	Nathalia Elise Troncoso	25	1.75 m (5 ft 9 in)	Baní
Puerto Plata	Anyely Mabel Custodio Cruz	20	1.74 m (5 ft 8 1/2 in)	Sosúa
Punta Cana	Analíz Victoria de la Cruz Rosario	21	1.73 m (5 ft 8 in)	Punta Cana
Salcedo	Shaderska Emilia Valdéz Durán	18	1.83 m (6 ft 0 in)	Salcedo
Samaná	Mariel Edá Rosario Rodríguez	26	1.77 m (5 ft 9 1/2 in)	Santa Bárbara de Samaná
San Cristóbal	Mariela Silvia Corporán Amador	21	1.78 m (5 ft 10 in)	San Cristóbal
San José de Ocoa	Leibys Franshesca Pujols Quéliz	20	1.75 m (5 ft 9 in)	San José de Ocoa
San Juan	Irsy Altagracia Vargas Arbaje	18	1.79 m (5 ft 10 1/2 in)	Las Matas de Farfán
San Pedro de Macorís	Marcell Anaïs Saleme Padilla	21	1.76 m (5 ft 9 1/2 in)	San Pedro de Macorís
Santiago	Aletxa Marie Mueses Santana	18	1.80 m (5 ft 11 in)	San José de las Matas
Santo Domingo Este	Denisse Elisette Peña Amechazurra	25	1.70 m (5 ft 7 in)	Santo Domingo Este
Santo Domingo Norte	Pamela del Rosario Encarnación	21	1.72 m (5 ft 7 1/2 in)	Santo Domingo Norte
Santo Domingo Oeste	Katherine Blanco de Llanos	19	1.83 m (6 ft 0 in)	Santo Domingo Oeste
Valverde	Karla Dastín Paniagua-Candelario	18	1.75 m (5 ft 9 in)	Santa Cruz de Mao
