= Miss Grand República Dominicana 2025 =

3rd edition of the Miss Grand Dominican Republic beauty pageant

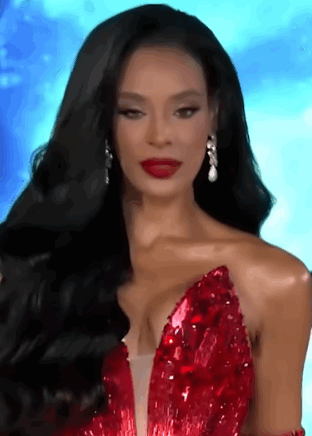
- Madelyn Mejía
- Date: May 3, 2025
- Presenters: Bray Vargas; Andreína Martínez
- Venue: Teatro La Fiesta, Renaissance Santo Domingo Jaragua Hotel & Casino, Santo Domingo
- Broadcaster: YouTube
- Entrants: 28
- Placements: 17
- Debuts: Altamira; Baní; Constanza; Monte Plata; Punta Cana; San Juan; San Pedro de Macorís; Santo Domingo Norte
- Withdrawals: Duarte; San Francisco de Macorís; Santo Domingo
- Returns: Barahona; Espaillat; Jarabacoa; La Altagracia; Santo Domingo Este
- Winner: Madelyn Mejía (Peravia)

External videos
- Grand final

Miss Grand República Dominicana 2025 or Miss Grand Dominican Republic 2025 was the third edition of the Miss Grand Dominican Republic pageant, held on May 3, 2025, at the Teatro La Fiesta, Hotel Renaissance Jaragua in Santo Domingo, with Nawat Itsaragrisil, the president of Miss Grand International, as the special guest. Twenty-eight contestants from different provinces and municipalities of the country competed for the title.

The contest was won by a 28-year-old model and engineer representing Peravia Province, Madelyn Mejía, who was crowned by the predecessor, Maria Felix of the Dominican Communities in USA. Mejía will represent the country at the international parental stage, Miss Grand International 2025, to be held in Thailand on 18 October 2025.

The grand final round of the pageant was hosted by a Dominican model and presenter, Bray Vargas, and 2nd runner-up Miss Universe 2022, Andreína Martínez. It was live transmitted to the audience worldwide via the organizer's YouTube channel, Misses of DR.

== Background ==
=== Date and venue ===
On 1 February 2025, the pageant organizer, Missess of the Dominican Republic Organization (Missess of DR), announced on their official social media that the 2025 Miss Grand Dominican Republic was scheduled for 3 May 2025 at the Teatro La Fiesta of the Renaissance Santo Domingo Jaragua Hotel & Casino in Santo Domingo, with the pageant camp period from 27 April to 4 May 2025.

The main sub-events of the pageant are detailed as follows.

- 28 April: Welcome dinner
- 30 April: Best in Swimsuit and Grand Voice rounds
- 2 May: Preliminary round
- 3 May: Grand finals

=== Selection of contestants ===
Contestants for this year's edition were directly chosen by the national organizer through the profile screening. Each eligible contestant was then assigned to represent one of the country's provinces; no local pageant was organized to determine their provincial representatives.

== Results ==
Miss Grand Dominican Republic 2025 competition result by province
Color key:
Winner	1st runner-up
2nd runner-up	3rd runner-up
4th runner-up	Top 10
Top 17	Unplaced
No representative

Placement	Delegate
Miss Grand Dominican Republic 2025	Peravia – Madelyn Mejía
1st-runner-up	Hermanas Mirabal – Anna Alvarado
2nd-runner-up	Monte Plata – Keitty Familia
3rd-runner-up	Puerto Plata – Diana Laiz
4th-runner-up	Santo Domingo Norte – Annerys Lisbeth López
Top 10	Altamira – Yorlenys Rodriguez; Baní – Crisbel Garcia; Distrito Nacional – Gabriela Cruz; Santo Domingo Oeste – Kiara Dominguez; Samaná – Samantha Dispre
Top 17	DOM Communities in USA – Catherine Alberto; Espaillat – Mayra Ovalles; Jarabacoa – Marie Marine; Santiago – María José Acosta; Santo Domingo Este – Rosibelis De Los Santos; San Pedro de Macorís – Anllely Hamilton; Valverde – Erika Estevez

== Contestants ==
The following contestants have been confirmed.

Represented	Contestant
Altamira (PP)	Yorlenys Rodriguez
Azua	Lunita Gaston
Baní (PV)	Crisbel Garcia
Barahona	Yamalisa Rubio-Perez
Constanza (VE)	Erika Aquino
Distrito Nacional	Gabriela Cruz
DOM Communities in USA	Catherine Alberto
Espaillat	Mayra Ovalles
Hermanas Mirabal	Anna Alvarado
Jarabacoa (VE)	Marie Marine
La Altagracia	Yoisa Yadira Moralez
La Romana	Yelissa Díaz
La Vega	Camila Sánchez
Monte Plata	Keitty Familia
Peravia	Madelyn Mejía
Puerto Plata	Diana Laiz
Punta Cana (AL)	Jubilo Ortega
Samaná	Samantha Dispre
San Cristóbal	Ivonne Morbán Mora
San Juan	Anabel Canario
San Pedro de Macorís	Anllely Hamilton
Santiago	María José Acosta
Santiago Oeste (ST)	Esther Cespedes
Santiago Rodríguez	Melody Rojas
Santo Domingo Este (SD)	Rosibelis De Los Santos
Santo Domingo Oeste (SD)	Kiara Dominguez
Santo Domingo Norte (SD)	Annerys Lisbeth López
Valverde	Erika Estevez
