= Miss Grand Dominican Republic 2016 =

1st Miss Grand Dominican Republic, beauty pageant edition

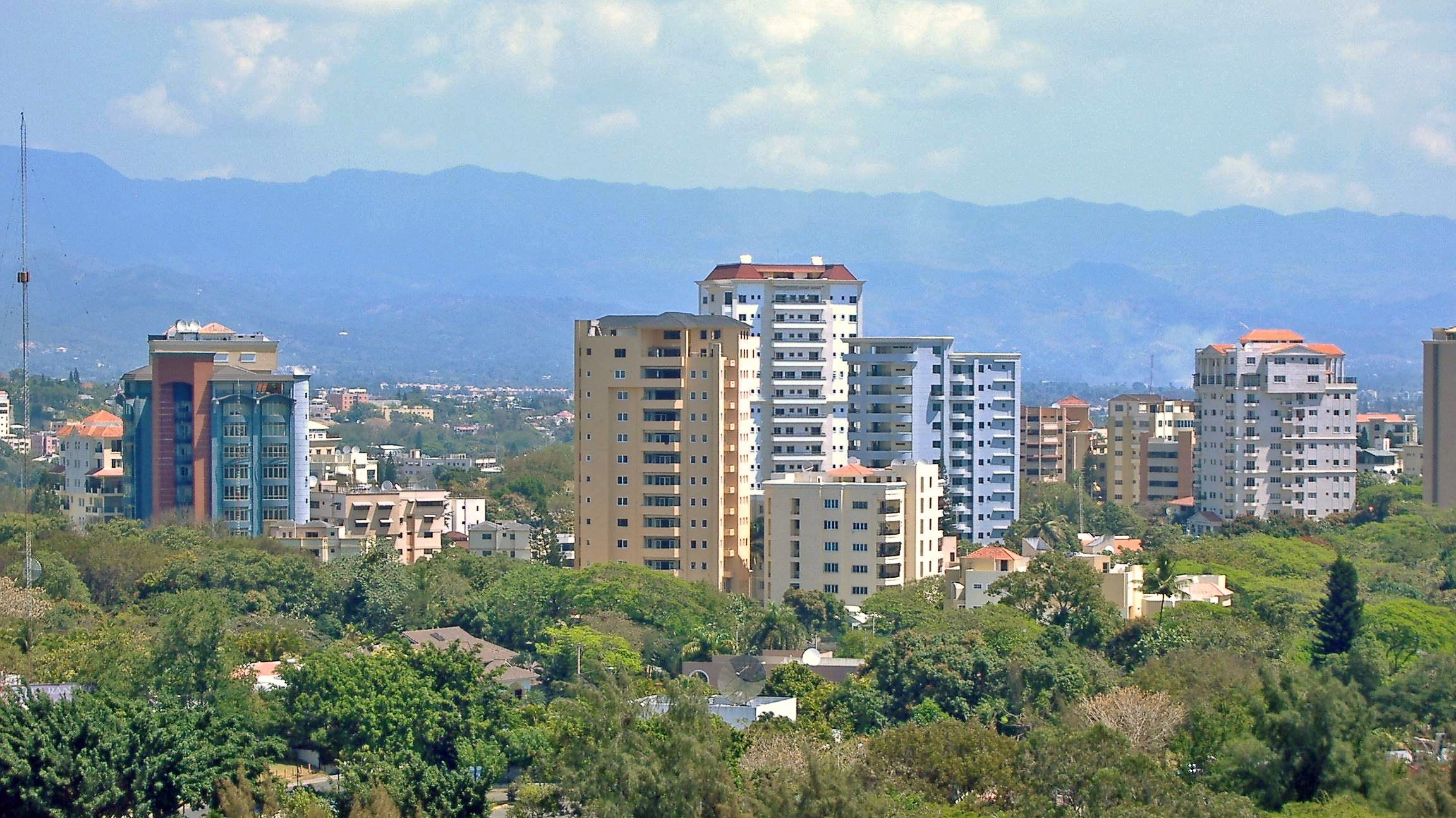
- Santiago de los Caballeros, the host city of the contest
- Date: 5 July 2016
- Presenters: Radhames Espiritu; Brenda Sanchez
- Venue: Cibao Grand Theatre, Santiago de los Caballeros
- Broadcaster: YouTube
- Entrants: 20
- Placements: 12
- Winner: Lucero Arias (Dajabón)

External videos
- Miss Grand Dominican Republic 2016 Grand Final Competition, on July 8, 2016, YouTube video

Miss Grand Dominican Republic 2016 (Spanish: Miss Grand República Dominicana 2016) was the inaugural edition of the Miss Grand Dominican Republic beauty pageant, held on July 5, 2016, at the Cibao Grand Theatre located in Santiago de los Caballeros, Dominican Republic. Candidates from twenty provinces and municipalities of the country competed for the title, of whom the representative of Dajabón Province, Lucero Arias, was announced the winner, and received cash of RD$400,000 Dominican peso as a reward, while Laura Cruz of Dominican communities in USA and Reisy Sobrino of Santo Domingo Oeste were named the runners-up.

The contest was managed by Chantel Martínez as national director, Bray Vargas as general director, and Bryan Vargas as production director. The grand final round of the contest was hosted by Radhames Espiritu and Brenda Sanchez.

The winner of the contest, Lucero Arias, later represented the Dominican Republic at the parent international contest, Miss Grand International 2016, held in Las Vegas, Nevada, but she was unplaced.

== Result ==
Position	Candidate
Miss Grand Dominican Republic 2016	Dajabón – Lucero Arias
1st runner-up	Dominican communities in USA – Laura Cruz
2nd runner-up	Santo Domingo Oeste – Reisy Sobrino
Top 6	La Vega – Nicaury Roca; Puerto Plata – Tonia Luna; Santo Domingo – Nathaly Mussed
Top 12	Espaillat – Kenia Paulino; Hermanas Mirabal – Karina Guzman; Jarabacoa – Brenda Cabral; La Altagracia – Laura Cabrera; Monseñor Nouel – Jaylene Guichardo; Peravia – Nicole Torres

== Candidates ==
Twenty delegates competed for the title of Miss Grand Dominican Republic 2016.

- Barahona – Marleny Minaya
- Dajabón – Lucero Arias
- Dominican communities in USA – Laura Cruz
- Duarte – Angelica Marcelino
- Espaillat – Kenia Paulino
- Hermanas Mirabal – Karina Guzman
- Jarabacoa – Brenda Cabral
- La Altagracia – Laura Cabrera
- La Vega – Nicaury Roca
- Monseñor Nouel – Jaylene Guichardo
- Monte Cristi – Sabrina Lazala
- Peravia – Nicole Torres
- Puerto Plata – Tonia Luna
- Samaná – Lillian Pichardo
- Santiago – Angelica Hernández
- Santiago Rodríguez – Jatna Suero
- Santo Domingo – Nathaly Mussed
- Santo Domingo Este – Luz Keila Vega
- Santo Domingo Oeste – Reisy Sobrino
- Valverde – Doraliz Peralta
