= Miss Grand Dominican Republic 2023 =

2nd edition of the Miss Grand Dominican Republic beauty pageant

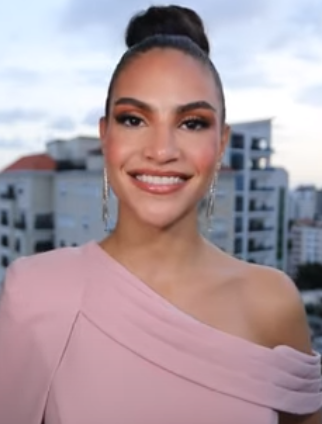
- Skarxi Marte, the winner of the contest
- Date: August 5, 2023
- Venue: Cibao Grand Theatre, Santiago de los Caballeros
- Broadcaster: YouTube
- Entrants: 18
- Placements: 13
- Winner: Skarxi Marie (Santiago)

Miss Grand Dominican Republic 2023 was the second edition of the Miss Grand Dominican Republic pageant, held on August 5, 2023, at the Cibao Grand Theatre, Santiago de los Caballeros. Candidates from eighteen provinces and municipalities of the country competed for the right to represent the country at its parent international stage, Miss Grand International 2023, to be held in Vietnam on October 25. Of whom, a 21-year-old biology student representing Santiago, Skarxi Marie, was selected the winner and was crowned by the 2022 titleholder, Jearmanda Ramos.

This edition was the first Miss Grand Dominican Republic contest managed by Alejandro Martínez and Jorge Cruz after they took over the license from a former licensee, Joe Amhed. Alejandro Martínez and Jorge Cruz were also the directors of another national pageant named Misses of Dominican Republic, in which the contest's winners were previously sent to compete in many international pageants, such as Miss Grand International, Miss Asia Pacific International, and Miss Supranational in 2021.

== Result ==
Miss Grand Dominican Republic 2023 competition result by province
Color key:
| Winner | 1st runner-up |
| 2nd runner-up | 3rd runner-up |
| 4th runner-up | 5th runner-up |
| Top 13 | Unplaced |
| Withdrew | No representative |

Miss Grand Dominican Republic 2023 competition result
| Position | Delegate |
|---|---|
| Miss Grand Dominican Republic 2023 | Santiago – Skarxi Marie |
| 1st runner-up | La Vega – Ashly Santos |
| 2nd runner-up | Dominican commu. in USA – Andreina Santos |
| 3rd runner-up | Puerto Plata – Pilar Beard Ortega |
| 4th runner-up | Distrito Nacional – Asia Ciaffarafa |
| 5th runner-up | San Cristóbal – Blainery Puello |
| Top13 | Azua – Camila Payano; Duarte – Zudeiny Cruz; Hermanas Mirabal – Nicole Hernandez; La Romana – Amberluk Lopez; Peravia – Arlin Basora Rojas; Santiago Oeste – Jessy Peralta; Valverde – Lisbette Payamps |

== Candidates ==
Eighteen candidates competed for the title.

- Azua – Camila Payano
- Distrito Nacional – Asia Ciaffarafa
- Dominican commu. in USA – Andreina Santos
- Duarte – Zudeiny Cruz
- Hermanas Mirabal – Nicole Hernandez
- La Romana – Amberluk Lopez
- La Vega – Ashly Santos
- Peravia – Arlin Basora Rojas
- Puerto Plata – Pilar Beard Ortega
- Samaná – Elisabeth Perez
- Santiago – Skarxi Marie
- Santiago Oeste – Jessy Peralta
- Santiago Rodríguez – Cristina Monción
- Santo Domingo – Rapunzel Nefer
- Santo Domingo Oeste – Leslie Martinez
- San Cristóbal – Blainery Puello
- San Francisco de Macorís – Karla Martínez
- Valverde – Lisbette Payamps
