= Pantoja, Santo Domingo, Dominican Republic =

Municipal District of Santo Domingo Province, Dominica Republic

Pantoja
- Municipal District
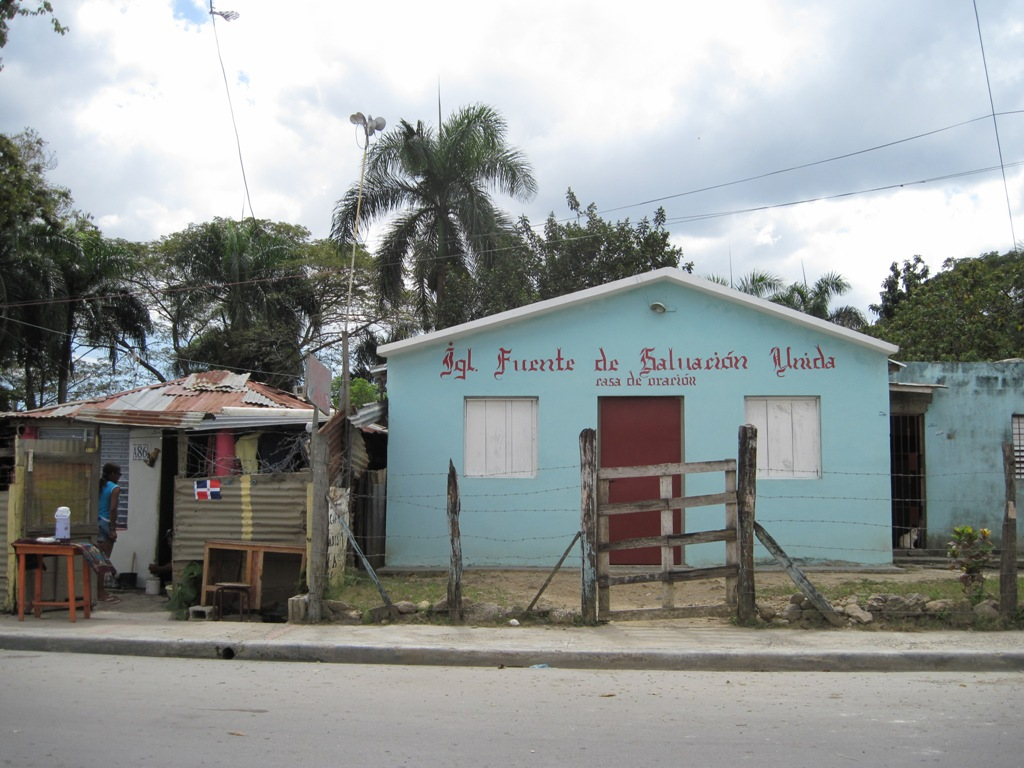
- A church building on the northern edge of the district

- Location within the Dominican Republic
- Coordinates: 18°31′30″N 70°00′04″W
- Country: Dominican Republic
- Province: Santo Domingo
- Municipality: Los Alcarrizos

Area
  - Total: 6.19 km^{2} (2.39 sq mi)
- Elevation: 47 m (154 ft)

Population (2022)
  - Total: 61,564
  - Density: 9,950/km^{2} (25,800/sq mi)
- Time zone: UTC-4 (ATZ)
- Postal code: 10701

Pantoja (Prounciation: /panˈtoxa/) is a municipal district located in Los Alcarrizos, Santo Domingo Province, Dominican Republic. Its population is 61,564 as of the year 2022.

== Geography ==
Pantoja is situated on the eastern part of Los Alcarrizos. It borders Palmarejo-Villa Linda and Santo Domingo Norte to the north, Santo Domingo de Guzmán to the east, and Santo Domingo Oeste to the south. The Dominican Republic highway DR-1 forms the southern and western boundary of the district.

== Demographics ==
According to the 2010 Dominican Republic census, the municipal district has a total population of 50,120, of which 24,559 are male and 25,561 are female.

== Administrative divisions ==
Pantoja is divided into the following 28 sectors:

1. La 800ta
2. Villa Duarte
3. Los Platanitos
4. La Isabela
5. Villa el Palmar
6. Villa Morada
7. Villa María
8. José Contreras
9. Los Rieles
10. Pegoro
11. La Redención
12. Las Colinas del Norte (antiguo Los Cocos)
13. Progreso
14. Don Gregorio I y II
15. Carmen Renata I
16. Carmen Renata II
17. Don Gregorio III
18. Los Prados de Pantoja
19. Barrio los Humildes
20. Villa Pantoja
21. Carmen Renata III
22. Residencial Monumental
23. Jardines de Pantoja
24. Residencial Esther
25. Res.Ciudad del sol
26. Barrio 23
27. Palmarejo
28. Galerías de Pantoja

== See also ==
- Los Alcarrizos
- Santo Domingo Province
