= Miss Dominican Republic 2013 =

- Date: August 3, 2013
- Presenters: Enrique Crespo, Reading Pantaleón, Sofia LaChapelle & Marta González Matos
- Entertainment: Amara la Negra y N'Klabe
- Venue: Punta Cana's Hard Rock Café Hotel & Casino, Salvaleón de Higüey, Dominican Republic
- Broadcaster: Colorvisión (Dominican Republic); Telemundo (U.S.); WapaTV (Puerto Rico)
- Entrants: 28
- Placements: 13
- Withdrawals: Bahoruco, Comunidad Dominicana en España, Comunidad Dominicana en Venezuela, Dajabón, El Seibo, Espaillat, Independencia, Jarabacoa, La Vega, San Cristóbal, San José de Ocoa, San Pedro de Macorís, Santiago Rodríguez
- Winner: Yaritza Reyes; Elías Piña

Miss República Dominicana 2013 was held on August 3, 2013, at the Punta Cana's Hard Rock Café Hotel & Casino in Salvaleón de Higüey, Dominican Republic.

The winner represented the Dominican Republic in Miss Universe 2013.

The First Runner-Up or "Miss Continentes República Dominicana" entered Miss United Continent 2013. The Second Runner-Up or "Miss República Dominicana Hispanoamérica" entered Reina Hispanoamericana 2013. The Third Runner-Up or "Miss Intercontinental República Dominicana" entered Miss Intercontinental 2013. The Fourth Runner-Up or "Miss Top Model República Dominicana" entered Top Model of the World 2014.

== Results ==
=== Placements ===
Placement	Contestant
Miss Dominican Republic 2013	Elías Piña – Yaritza Miguelina Reyes
1st Runner-Up	Distrito Nacional – Anyelina Sánchez
2nd Runner-Up	Samaná – Alma Álvarez
3rd Runner-Up	Peravia – Melissa Amaro
4th Runner-Up	Guayacanes – Nicole Valdéz
5th Runner-Up	Estados Unidos – Chantel Martínez
Top 13	Santo Domingo Este – María Nelly Vicioso; San Juan – Gloria Ramírez; Santiago – Marileny Tejera; Santo Domingo Oeste – Jissett Hernández; La Altagracia – Irina Peguero; Puerto Rico – Tracy King; Las Matas de Farfán – Auilda García §

§ – Won Top 13 semifinalist spot by online voting and text messages.

== Contestants ==
Province	Contestant	Age	Height	Hometown
Azua	Giselle Altagracia Ramírez Zouain	23	1.63 m (5 ft 4 in)	Azua de Compostela
Baoruco	Génesis Rodríguez Rueckschnatt	19	1.75 m (5 ft 9 in)	Santo Domingo
Barahona	Penélope Vanesa Muñóz Salvador	24	1.67 m (5 ft 5 1/2 in)	Santa Cruz de Barahona
Com. Dom. En Estados Unidos	Chantel Martínez Figueroa	19	1.80 m (5 ft 11 in)	New York City
Com. Dom. En Puerto Rico	Tracy King Porchue	21	1.84 m (6 ft 1/2 in)	Santurce
Distrito Nacional	Anyelina Mariel Sánchez Guzmán	22	1.78 m (5 ft 10 in)	Santo Domingo
Duarte	Massiel Gutiérrez	21	1.83 m (6 ft 0 in)	San Francisco de Macorís
Elías Piña	Yaritza Miguelina Reyes Ramírez	19	1.81 m (5 ft 11 1/2 in)	Santo Domingo
Guayacanes	Nicole Cristina Valdéz Abud	24	1.77 m (5 ft 9 1/2 in)	Guayacanes
Hato Mayor	Aura Marienny Oviedo Sánchez-Lucchéce	19	1.76 m (5 ft 9 1/2 in)	Hato Mayor del Rey
Hermanas Mirabal	Nairoby Sherazade Ñañez Figuereo	21	1.68 m (5 ft 6 in)	Santo Domingo
La Altagracia	Irina Peguero Reyes	20	1.88 m (6 ft 2 in)	Salvaleón de Higüey
La Romana	Ivette Marie Rivera Objio	22	1.77 m (5 ft 9 1/2 in)	La Romana
Las Matas de Farfán	Auilda Yarelisa García Jiménez	23	1.61 m (5 ft 3 1/2 in)	Las Matas de Farfán
María Trinidad Sánchez	Chantal Marie Arias García	18	1.76 m (5 ft 9 1/2 in)	Cabrera
Monseñor Nouel	Georgina Vasiliou Romero	25	1.66 m (5 ft 5 1/2 in)	Bonao
Monte Cristi	Bianca Natasha Hazim Madera	23	1.78 m (5 ft 10 in)	Santo Domingo
Monte Plata	Rosy María Guerrero de la Cruz	18	1.76 m (5 ft 9 1/2 in)	Bayaguana
Pedernales	Nathalie Patricia Ceballos de la Cruz	19	1.73 m (5 ft 8 in)	Santo Domingo
Peravia	Melissa Yssasha Amaro Azize	22	1.70 m (5 ft 7 in)	Baní
Puerto Plata	Joelysa Rodríguez Morales	21	1.72 m (5 ft 7 1/2 in)	Sosúa
Samaná	Alma Virginia Álvarez Alfonso	21	1.77 m (5 ft 9 1/2 in)	Santo Domingo
San Juan	Gloria Ramírez Belliard	25	1.75 m (5 ft 9 in)	San Juan de la Maguana
Sánchez Ramírez	Florangel Vásquez Fernández	18	1.79 m (5 ft 10 1/2 in)	Cotuí
Santiago	Marileny Altagracia Tejera Corona	24	1.76 m (5 ft 9 1/2 in)	Santiago de los Caballeros
Santo Domingo Este	María Nelly Vicioso Martínez	24	1.74 m (5 ft 8 1/2 in)	San Juan
Santo Domingo Norte	Estefanía Luz Botello Ramírez	18	1.75 m (5 ft 9 in)	Santo Domingo
Santo Domingo Oeste	Jissett Altagracia Hernández Pérez	25	1.78 m (5 ft 10 in)	Santo Domingo
Valverde	Yendy Carlina Vargas Cruz	20	1.65 m (5 ft 5 in)	Santa Cruz de Mao
