= Greater Santo Domingo =

Metropolitan area in the Dominican Republic

- Metropolitan area
- Gran Santo Domingo (Spanish)
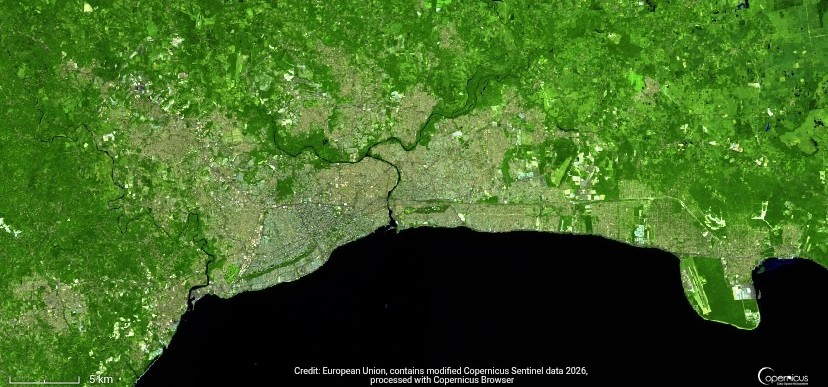
- Satellite view of Greater Santo Domingo, 2025
- Motto(s): "Ciudad Primada de América" (in Spanish) ("First City of the Americas")
- Country: Dominican Republic
- District: Santo Domingo
- Province: Santo Domingo Province
- Named for: Saint Dominic

Population (2025)
  - Total: 4,751,036
- Time zone: UTC−04:00 (AST)

Greater Santo Domingo (Spanish: Gran Santo Domingo) is a term commonly used referring to the metropolitan area of Santo Domingo in the Dominican Republic. There are 11 municipalities that are associated with the Commonwealth of the Greater Santo Domingo.

== Subdivisions ==
- Distrito Nacional (National District)
  - Santo Domingo
- Santo Domingo Province
  - Boca Chica
  - Los Alcarrizos
  - Pedro Brand
  - San Antonio de Guerra
  - Santo Domingo Este (East Santo Domingo)
  - Santo Domingo Norte (North Santo Domingo)
  - Santo Domingo Oeste (West Santo Domingo)
