= Tenares =

- Location within the Dominican Republic
- Coordinates: 19°22′12″N 70°21′0″W
- Country: Dominican Republic
- Province: Hermanas Mirabal

Area
  - Total: 159.71 km^{2} (61.66 sq mi)

Population (2012)
  - Total: 30,110
  - Density: 188.5/km^{2} (488.3/sq mi)
- Demonym: Tenarense(a)
- Distance to – Salcedo: 6 km
- Municipalities: 1

Tenares is a town in the Hermanas Mirabal province of the Dominican Republic.

== Sources ==
- – World-Gazetteer.com
