= Los Alcarrizos =

- Municipality
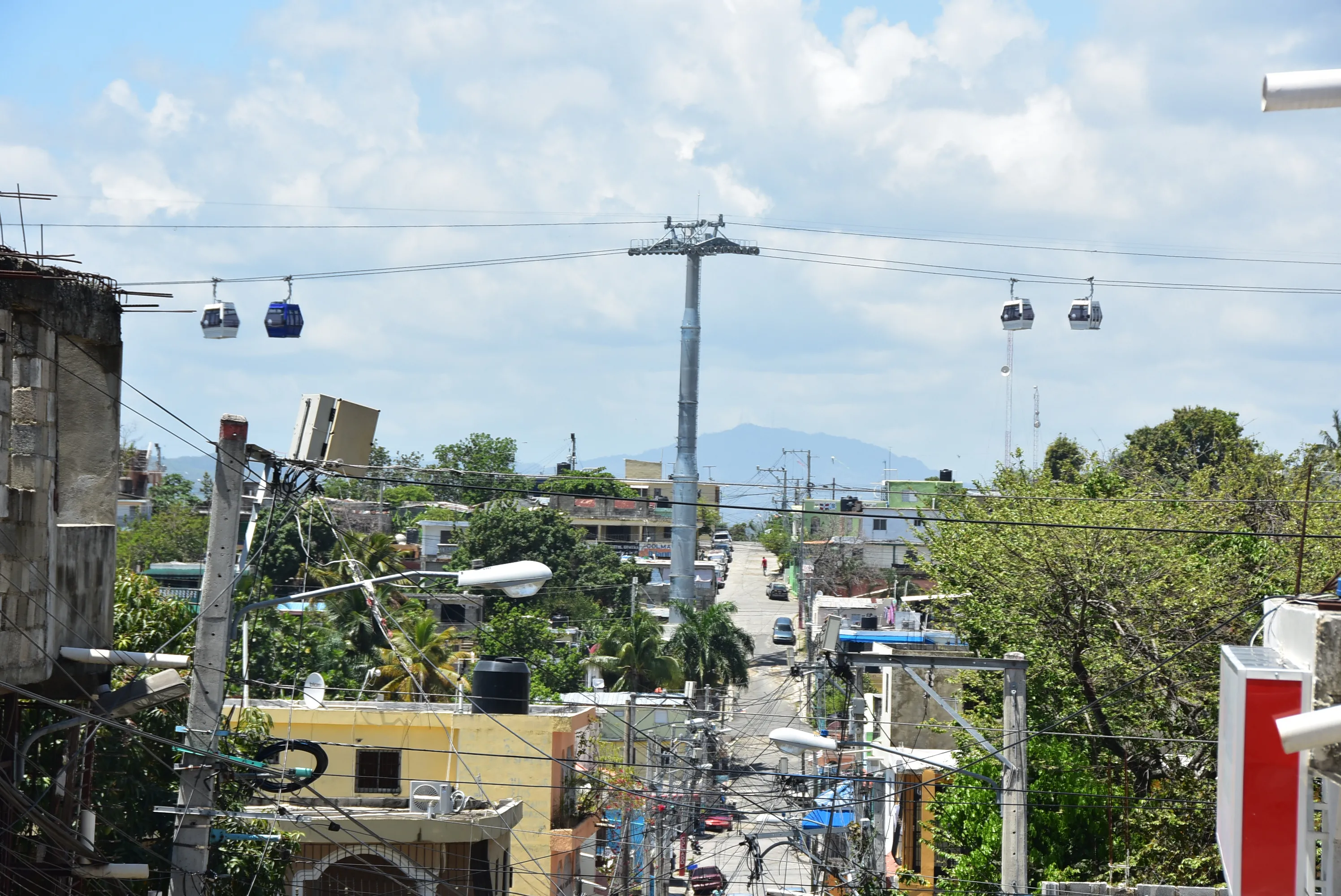
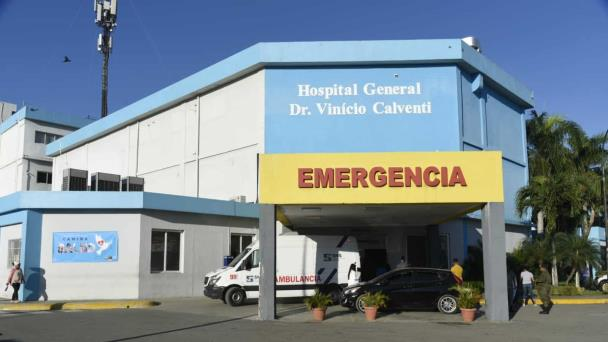
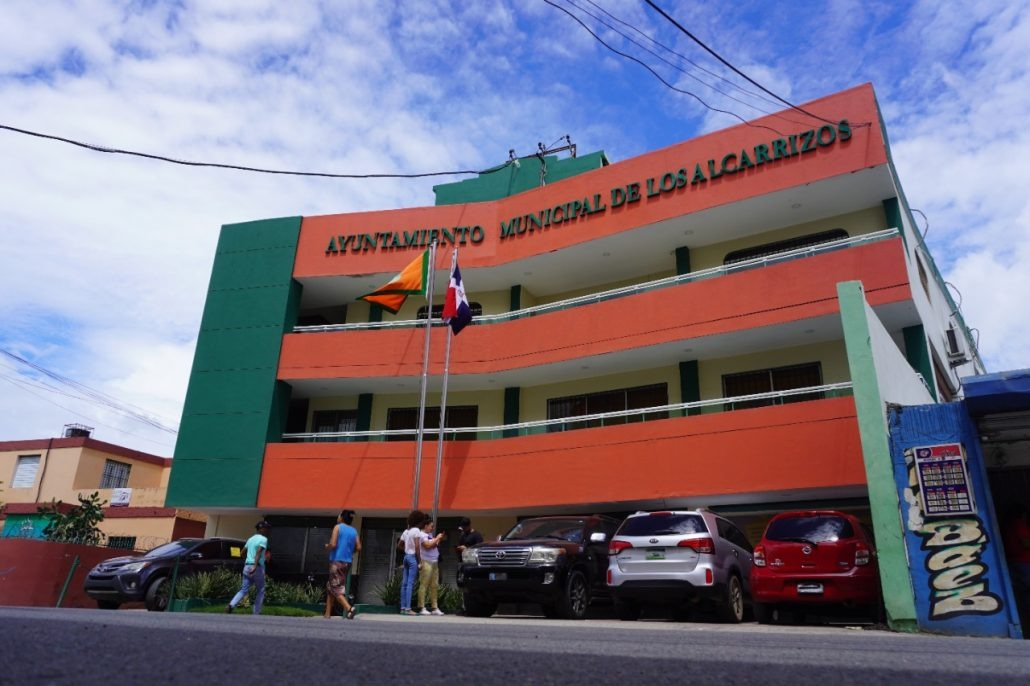
- Los Alcarrizos cable car Doctor Vinicio Calventi Hospital Los Alcarrizos Town Hall

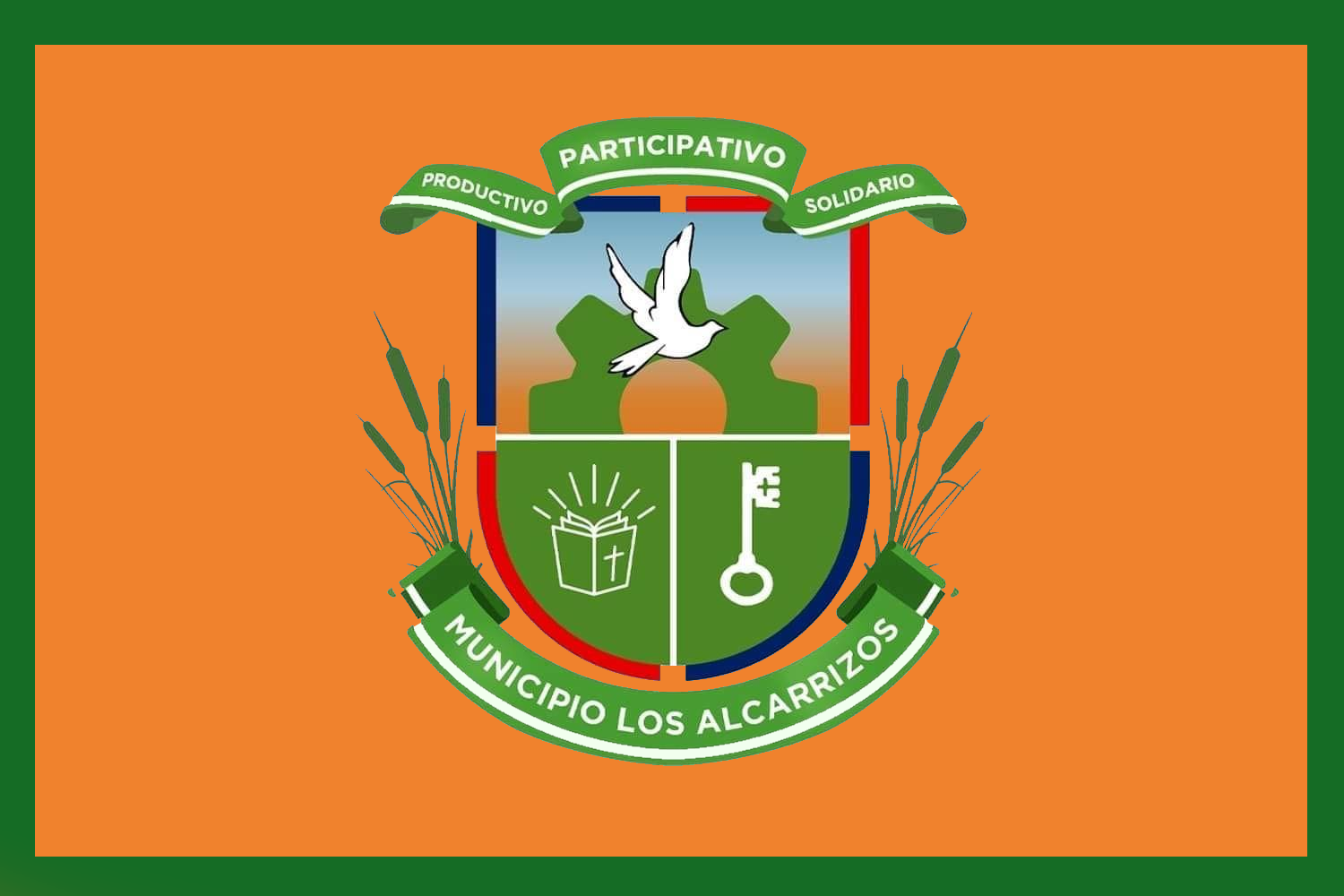
- Flag

- Map of the municipality of Los Alcarrizos
- Country: Dominican Republic
- Province: Santo Domingo
- Municipal districts: 3
- Established: January 30, 2005

Area
  - Total: 52.14 km^{2} (20.13 sq mi)

Population
  - Total: 336,307
  - Density: 6,038/km^{2} (15,640/sq mi)
- Demonym: Alcarricense
- Time zone: UTC-4
- Area code(s): +1 (809, 829, 849)
- Website: ayuntamientolosalcarrizos.gob.do

Los Alcarrizos is a municipality (municipio) of the Santo Domingo province in the Dominican Republic. Within the municipality there are the following municipal districts (distritos municipales): Palmarejo-Villa Linda and Pantoja. The municipality of Los Alcarrizos is home to 336,307 inhabitants (2022), making it one of the most populous municipalities in the country. In recent years, the growth of this municipality It has been accelerated, which makes the municipality of Los Alcarrizos in a large urban center within the metropolitan area of Greater Santo Domingo.

== History ==
The town of Los Alcarrizos was founded at the end of the 18th century; this village turned out to be a place of passage for travelers going to or coming from the Central Cibao.

In 1824, during the Haitian occupation, this town was the scene of protests against the invaders' economic measures. These protests have gone down in history as the Revolution of Los Alcarrizos. This rebellion was one of the first struggles for separation from Haiti, which aimed to reestablish Spanish rule in the eastern part of the island.

By 1966, Los Alcarrizos was not a significant town in terms of population or territory. Its inhabitants were few, and the only population center was what is now called Los Alcarrizos Viejos. The most important religious institution that existed was the Church of Saint Anthony of Padua (San Antonio de Padua), still in existence; the Passionist priests, such as the parish priest Benito Arrieta, who served the church, contributed significantly to the development of the community.

In this area, during the early 20th century, there was significant livestock farming and sugar production. A railway line ran through the community and surrounding areas from one end to the other, exclusively used to transport sugarcane to the Haina sugar mill. This industry disappeared from the area at the beginning of the 21st century, and the land was transformed into manufacturing industries and real estate developments.

The large community of Los Alcarrizos was formed between 1970 and 1972. Then-President Joaquín Balaguer was undertaking major urban development projects and ordered mass evictions in various neighborhoods of Santo Domingo, such as Ensanche Quisqueya, Villa Consuelo, and others. The residents were relocated to this community, along with immigrants who had settled on land for various reasons. The largest population growth occurred in 1979 with the construction of Los Barrancones to house those left homeless by Hurricane David in different parts of Santo Domingo.

Between 1990 and 1994, during Joaquín Balaguer's presidency, Los Alcarrizos II (Los Alcarrizos Segundo) was created to house people displaced from the neighborhoods of Maquiteria, Villa Duarte, Los Mameyes, and La Ciénaga due to the construction of the Faro a Colón. It also housed residents from neighborhoods affected by Hurricane David.

Between the 1990s and 2000s, projects such as the Barrio INVI, or Los Americanos, were developed between the governments of Leonel Fernández and Hipólito Mejía.

The first elected municipal authorities were sworn in during 2003, and were headed by Ángel Luis Rodríguez, who remained in office until August 16, 2006.

Since then, there have been new projects in Los Alcarrizos aimed at improving connectivity within the municipality. In 2021, construction was slated to begin on the Circunvalación Los Alcarrizos, an avenue intended to replace Calle Duarte, the area's main thoroughfare. Although completion was promised for early 2026, no openings have been seen.

In May 2023, the second line of the Teleférico de Santo Domingo, known as the "Teleférico de Los Alcarrizos", was inaugurated with 4.19 kilometers and 4 stations, inside Los Alcarrizos.

In February 2026, three years later, the extension of Line 2 of the Santo Domingo Metro was inaugurated along 7.3 kilometers, benefiting residents of Santo Domingo Oeste and Los Alcarrizos, and causing an increase in the value of land in the sector.

== Demography ==
According to the 2022 census, the municipality of Los Alcarrizos had 336,307 inhabitants, of which 165,435 were men and 170,872 were women.

Over the years, the municipality has experienced significant population growth, going from 272,776 inhabitants in 2010 to 336,307 in 2022, which implies an average annual growth rate of 1.77% during that period.

== Economy ==
The municipality has evolved in various areas; in terms of industry, it has free trade zones, diverse workshops, food processing plants, supermarkets, churches, and shops. It also boasts several official and private service organizations: police, fire department, city hall, civil defense, public health services (including the Dr. Vinicio Calventi General Hospital and two public sub-centers) and private clinics, organized transportation, potable water, telecommunications, roads, street lighting, and public and private education. Furthermore, it has a variety of nightclubs, bars, restaurants, and other establishments.

== Transport ==
The Los Alcarrizos district boasts a wide range of transportation options that has evolved over the years, including busy avenues and streets. The Los Alcarrizos cable car (Line 2 of the Teleférico de Santo Domingo), opened in May 2023, has four stations: Los Alcarrizos, Las Toronjas, Puente Blanco, and Los Americanos, covering 4.2 kilometers. Line 2 of the Santo Domingo Metro, at the Pablo Adón Guzmán station, opened along with the line extension in February 2026, spanning 7.3 kilometers, serves the large town of Los Alcarrizos, connecting it to the Distrito Nacional. Several motorcycle taxi routes connect this town to Kilometer 9, the main entrance to the Distrito Nacional.

=== Avenues and routes ===
In the town of Los Alcarrizos, several routes and thoroughfares crisscross the area. Calle Duarte is currently the main artery, running from the Autopista Duarte in the east to the Carretera Hato Nuevo in the west. It also serves as a commercial artery, where most of the town's businesses are concentrated. To the west, the Carretera Hato Nuevo runs from the Autopista Duarte in La Guáyiga to the suburb of Hato Nuevo, and includes points of interest such as the Dr. Vinicio Calventi Hospital and the Los Alcarrizos Free Trade Zone.

The Circunvalación de Los Alcarrizos avenue is a road currently under construction, along 6.3 kilometers with three lanes in each direction, from the Circunvalación de Santo Domingo to the Autopista Duarte.

== Notable figures ==
• Dalvin La Melodía: Dominican bachata singer known for hits like "Chiquilla Bonita"

• Junior Santos: former mayor of the Los Alcarrizos district from 2006 to 2020.

• Pablo Adón Guzmán: PRD representative for Los Alcarrizos, deceased in 2012.

== Religion ==
The Los Alcarrizos district has numerous parishes, Catholic chapels, and Protestant churches. It is a town with deep Christian roots, and every Good Friday, a Stations of the Cross procession draws thousands of Catholics, making it one of the largest Christian events in the municipality. Protestant churches also hold a march in July, from the entrance of Los Alcarrizos to Los Americanos. These churches include:

• Church of God Inc.

• Assemblies of God

• Seventh-day Adventist Church

• The Church of Jesus Christ of Latter-day Saints (Mormons), which have several congregations, sports fields, and a membership exceeding 6,000 people, representing between 5% and 6% of the population.
