= Yrene Santos =

Dominican poet, cultural activist, educator, and performer

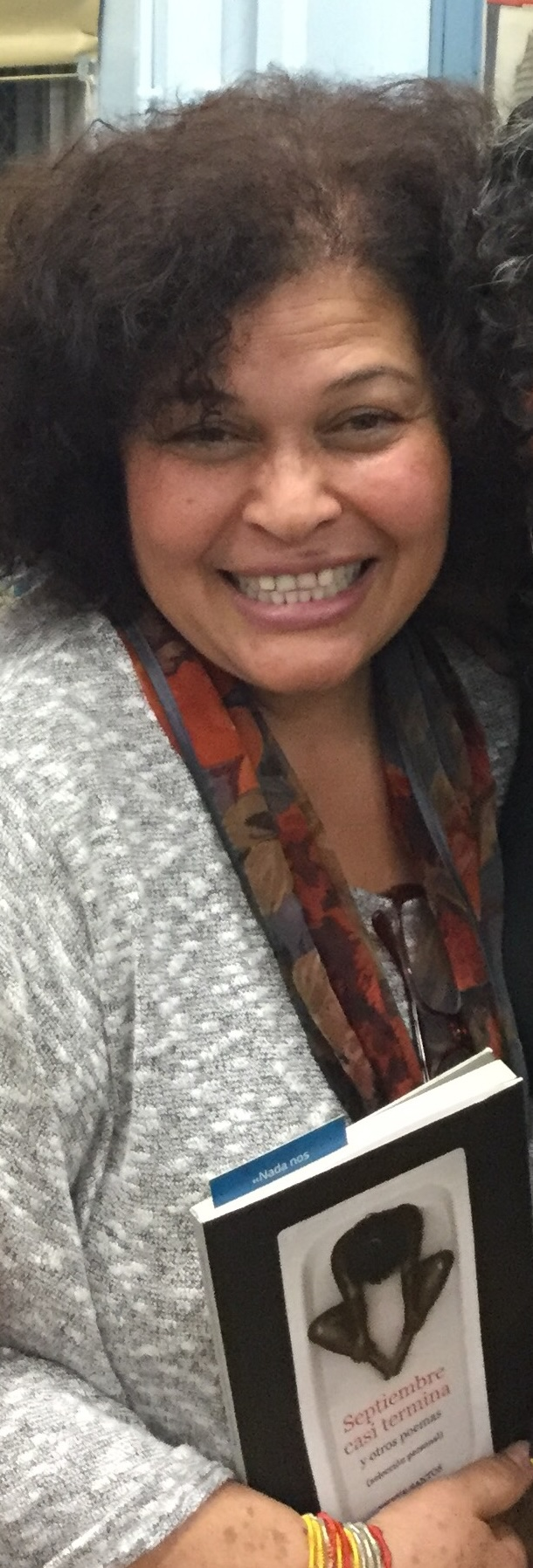
Yrene Santos at the Feria Del Libro Dominicano, New York 2016

Yrene Santos (born June 27, 1963) is a poet, cultural activist, educator, and performer from the Dominican Republic.

== Life ==
Santos was born in Villa Tapia and studied Acting in the Escuela Nacional de Bellas Artes y Education at the Universidad Autónoma de Santo Domingo and graduated with a bachelors in Education with a minor in Philosophy and Literature. Santos went on to obtain a master's degree in Hispanic American Literature from the City University of New York.

She lives in New York, where she works as an adjunct professor of literature and Spanish language at City College, York College, and St. John's University. She is one of the founders of the Tertulia de Escritoras Dominicanas en Nueva York, which provides a supportive and collaborative space for Dominican women writers in the US. Santos is also a member of the Latino Artists Round Table (LART), led by Cuban author Sonia Rivera Valdes and serves on the committee of the New York Hispanic/Latino Book Fair, which is directed by writer and cultural activist Juan Tineo. Along with Carlos Velasquez Torres and Carlos Aguasaco, she is the co-founder of the Americas Poetry Festival of New York and a co-editor of the festival's anthologies since 2014. She has also served as Secretary-General of the Asociación de Escritores Dominicanos en los Estados Unidos (ASEDEU) [Association of Dominican Writers in the United States].

== Selected works ==
- El andar permanente [Perpetual Wandering] (Honduras, 2025)
- Del ayer y estos días[From the Past to Days Present] (Spain, 2022)
- Poemas que nunca leo [Poems I Never Read] (Puerto Rico, 2019)
- Pozos [Wells] (El Salvador, 2017)
- Septiembre casi termina: y otros poemas [September is almost over ] (Dominican Republic, 2016)
- Por el asombro [Through wonder] (Ecuador, 2015)
- Me sorprendió geométrica (poemas reunidos) [Geometric Surprised Me] (New York, 2013)
- Después de la lluvia [After the rain] (Dominican Republic, 2009)
- Por si alguien llega [In case someone arrives] (New York, 2009)
- El incansable juego [The tireless game] (Dominican Republic, 2002)
- Reencuentro [Reunion] (New York, 1997)
- Desnudez del silencio [Nakedness of silence] (Dominican Republic, 1988).
- Co-author of the book Desde la diáspora: cuentos y poemas de niños y niñas dominicanos [From the Diaspora: Stories and poems by Dominican children] (New York, 2005)

== Awards and honors ==
She has spoken at the Hispanic and Latinx heritage poetry festival at Ohio Weslyan University, and the Hispanic Heritage poetry festival. Her poetry has been featured in the Global Foundation for Democracy and Development's celebration of Dominican women writers.

She was one of two writers to whom the 2016 Dominican Book Festival of New York was dedicated.

In 2013, she was the Guest of Honor at the 10 Feria Internacional del Libro de Escritoras Dominicanas, organized by the Centro de Desarrollo de la Mujer dominicana (DWDC) in New York.
