= Santo Domingo cable car =

Cable car urban transit system in the Dominican Republic

Teleférico de Santo Domingo
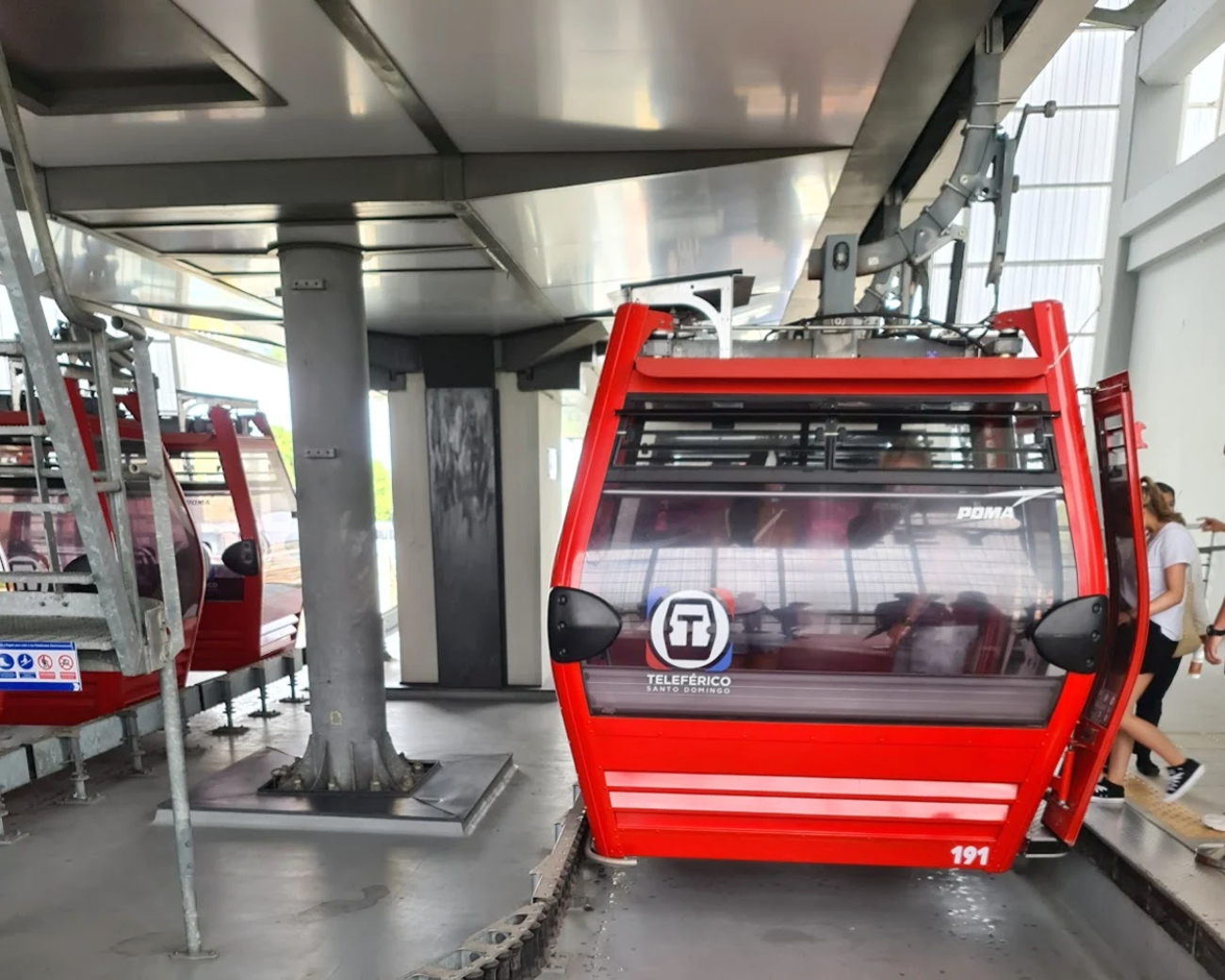

Overview
- Status: Operational
- Character: Gondola lift
- System: Santo Domingo Metro
- Line no.: 2
- Location: Santo Domingo Norte & Santo Domingo Este, Santo Domingo, Dominican Republic
- No. of stations: 8
- Open: May 23, 2018

Operation
- Operator: Oficina para el Reordenamiento de Transporte (OPRET)

Technical features
- Line length: 9.2 km

The Santo Domingo cable car (Spanish: Teleférico de Santo Domingo) is an aerial cable car urban transit system in Greater Santo Domingo, operated as part of the Santo Domingo Metro. It is the first urban-transport aerial cable car line in the Dominican Republic. It functions as a typical monocable gondola. The first line runs for 5 kilometres and an four stations while the second line has an extension of 4.2 kilometers and four stations. The system is connected to the Santo Domingo metro.

== History ==
The idea for the construction of a gondola arose as an answer to the issue of gridlock during peak hours, deficiencies in—and the high cost of—public transportation, and the need for a mode of transportation for the commuters living in the outlying areas of the Isabela and Ozama rivers, as well as for those living northeast to the city.

The system was inspired by the Metrocable of Medellín, Colombia, and was designed for the transportation of 6,000 passengers per hour, with 195 cabins which would cycle constantly, with an average of 12 seconds per compartment and a capacity of 10 seated passengers each. Target ridership for the system was set at 287,000 people. The system was designed to serve the National District and the municipalities of Santo Domingo Este and Santo Domingo Norte, forming part of the adaptation program of Nueva Barquita. The system was also designed to be accessible for people with limited vision and mobility.

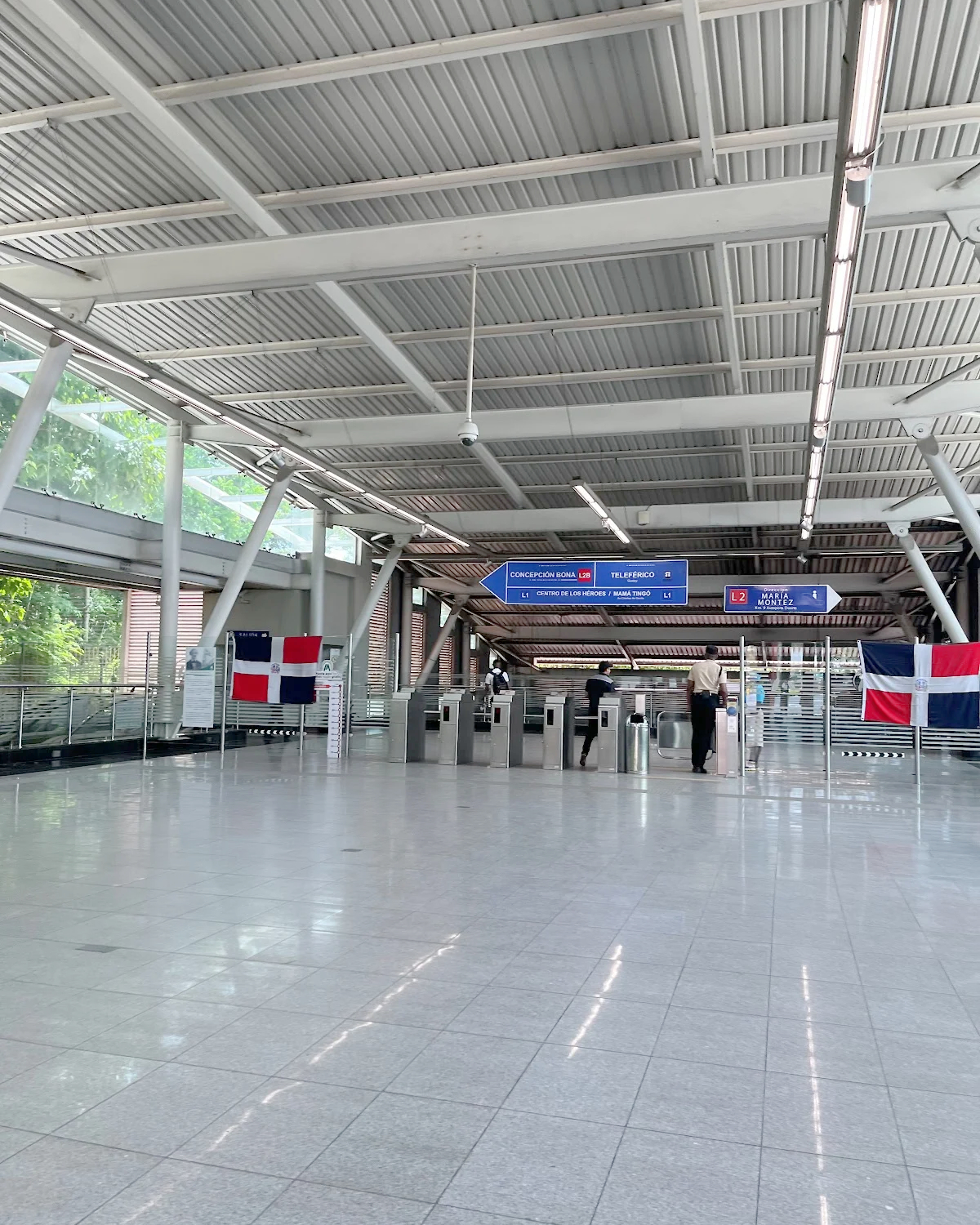
Dominican Republic cable car station.

The sky cable system was constructed as an interconnection of the Gualey, Los Tres Brazos, and Sabana Perdida sectors, with connections with the Santo Domingo Metro and its auxiliary routes.

The construction of the cable car system and its four stations required intervention in its surroundings, the assembly of the electromechanical system with five platforms, 36 support towers and the assembly of the cable-carrying tractor. Due to irregular topography at the site of some of the stations, several steps were designed to bridge the distance between the buildings and platforms.

The cable car system was inaugurated on 23 May 2018, and commenced regular operations on 1 July 2018. It has the capacity to transport 6,000 passengers per hour (54,000 per day) in both directions combined, with a schedule from 6 a.m. to 9 p.m.

== Route ==
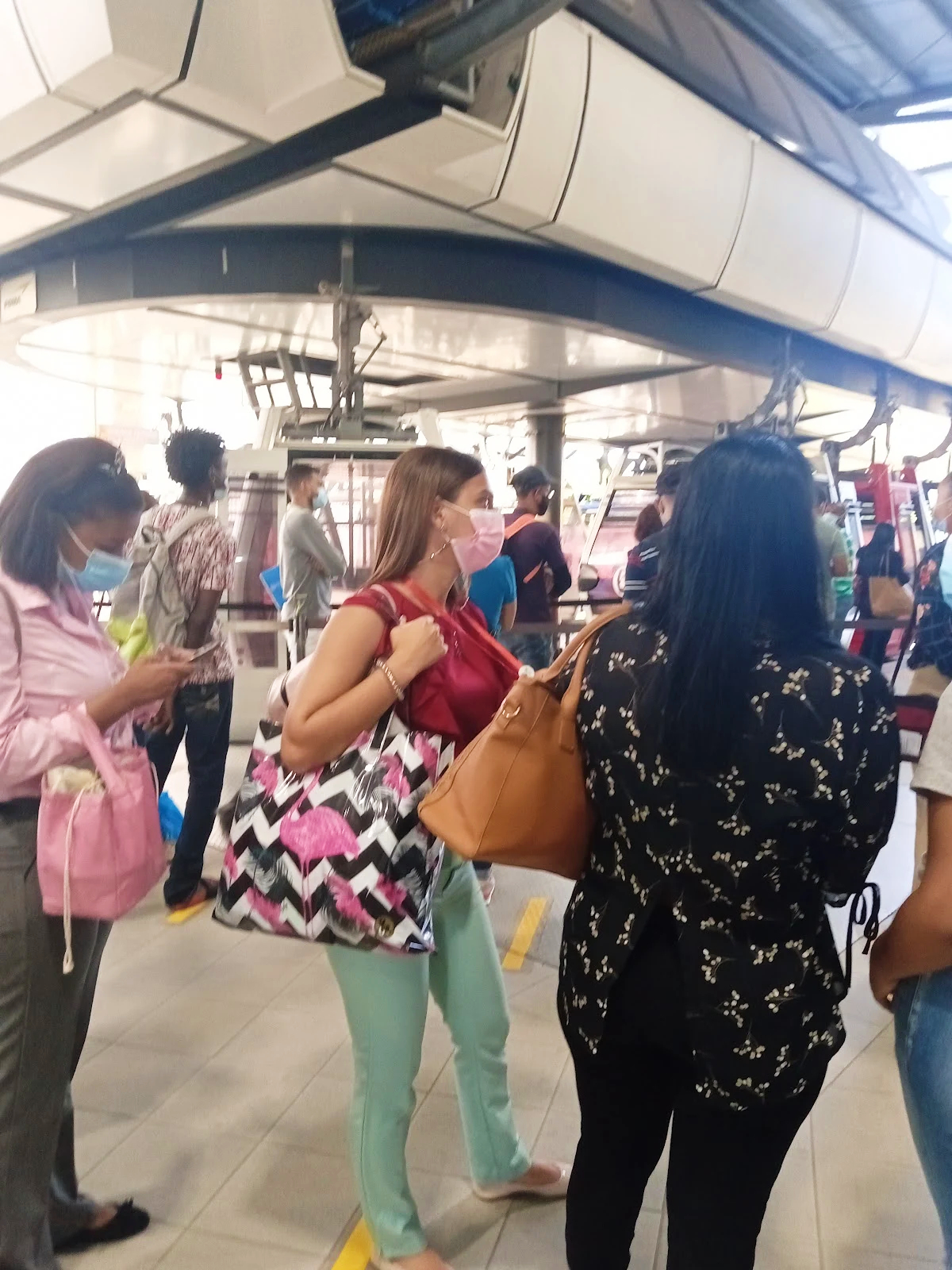
People in Gualey station

=== Line 1 Sabana Perdida ===
The route begins at station Eduardo Brito on Line 2 of the Santo Domingo metro, with cable car (Teleférico) station #1 (T1), Gualey Station, encompassing the Los Guandules, Ensanche Espaillat, 24 de Abril, María Auxiliadora and Domingo Savio sectors.

The second cable car station (T2), Los Tres Brazos Station, encompasses the Jardines del Ozama, Moisés and Las Lilas sectors, passing through the third station (T3), Sabana Perdida Station, for the Los Palmares, Bello Amanecer, Brisas del Este, Brisa de Los Palmares, La Javilla, La Victoria, Sabana Perdida Centro, Villa Blanca, Salomé Ureña, La Barquita Norte, Cerros del Paraíso and Sabana Perdida Norte sectors, arriving at Charles de Gaulle station (T4), in Santo Domingo Norte, for a total distance travelled of 5 kilometres.

=== Line 2 Los Alcarrizos ===
The second line of the Santo Domingo cable car begins at Los Alcarrizos Station (T1), integrated with the national metro network to serve the Los Castillos and Savica sectors. From there, it reaches the second station (T2), Las Toronjas, providing transit for residents of Barrio Lindo and surrounding communities, then proceeds to the third station (T3), Puente Blanco, encompassing the Hato Nuevo and Progreso areas. The final stop is situated at Los Americanos Station (T4), bringing the total length of the aerial lift system to 4.2 kilometers across the Los Alcarrizos district.

== Stations ==
The Santo Domingo Cable Car consists of two independent lines integrated into the city’s mass transit network, covering a combined distance of 9.2 kilometers. Both lines are designed to integrate with the urban environment through the revitalization of public spaces, pedestrian walkways, and green areas at each terminal.

=== Line 1 ===
Line 1 serves the northeastern metropolitan area, spanning 5 kilometers. It is physically and financially integrated with the Santo Domingo Metro via a pedestrian tunnel connecting Eduardo Brito Station (Line 2) to Gualey Station.

- Gualey (T1): Located on the banks of the Ozama River, this is a return station that serves as the primary connection point to the metro system.
- Los Tres Brazos (T2): A power and drive station where the axis of the cable car changes direction by approximately 35 degrees to navigate the urban layout.
- Sabana Perdida (T3): A commuter station and the system's largest facility, housing the central garage with a capacity for 215 cable car cabins.
- Charles de Gaulle (T4): The final return station of the line, located on the Charles de Gaulle highway in Santo Domingo Norte.

=== Line 2 ===
Line 2 serves the western municipality of Los Alcarrizos with a 4.2-kilometer route. It significantly reduces transit times for the western suburbs, operating at a speed of 18 kilometers per hour.

- Los Alcarrizos (T1): The starting terminal integrated with the Line 2C expansion of the Santo Domingo Metro, acting as a major intermodal hub.
- Las Toronjas (T2): A transit station providing aerial access to the densely populated El Chucho and Los Libertadores neighborhoods.
- Puente Blanco (T3): A station encompassing the areas of Las Mercedes and Villa Linda, facilitating mobility in historically congested zones.
- Los Americanos (T4): The terminal station located in the westernmost part of the municipality, completing the 4.2-kilometer circuit.

== Criticisms ==
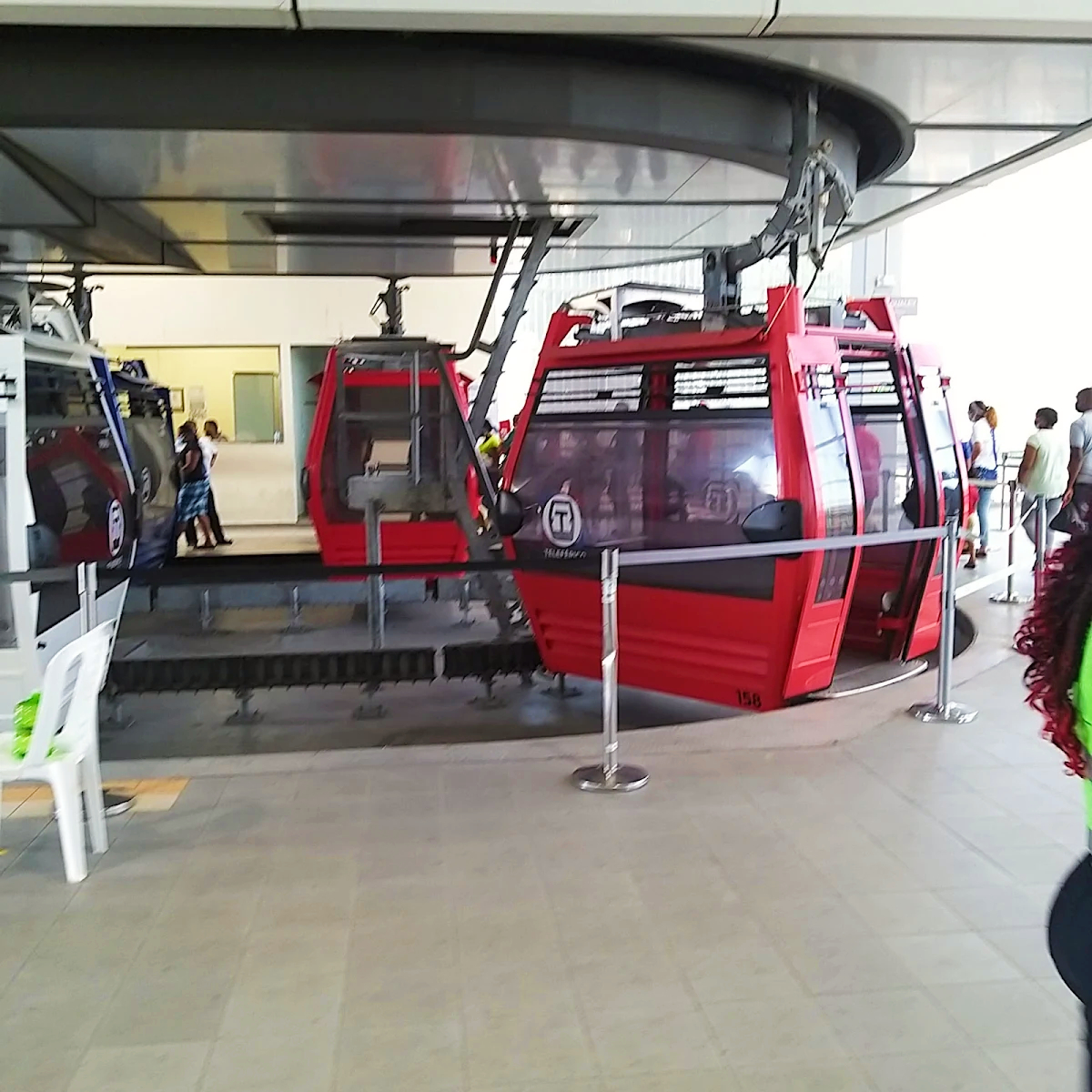
Cable cars at Gualey Station

The cable car system received widespread criticism—particularly on social media platforms—from various sectors of the society, due to the possibility of malfunction, the placement of the towers in poor locations (such as blocking streets), and the insecurity of having a cable car passing above homes and schools. An additional criticism arises from the fact that the cable car shows the poverty of the city when travelling over the marginal sectors of Santo Domingo, such as the neighbourhoods located on the banks of the Ozama River.

Through an education campaign, the Office for the Reordering of Transport (OPRET) issued statements on the operation of the cable car and on possible system failures.

== Future lines ==
In the 2019 national budget, the President of the Republic included RD$ 4 billion for the construction of a second cable car line. The second line was projected to run a total of 11 kilometers, and to connect the Los Alcarrizos sector with kilometer 9 of the Duarte highway with six stations. This was changed to 4.2 kilometers with four stations. The line opened to the public on 2 May 2023.
