= Miss Italia nel Mondo =

Italian beauty pageant

- Formation: 1990; 30 years ago
- Type: Beauty Pageant
- Headquarters: Rome
- Location: Italy
- Official language: Italian

Miss Italia nel Mondo or Miss Italy in the World is an Italian beauty pageant for women of Italian heritage which has been held since 1990. Dozens of countries vie for the crown annually in the pageant held each year in Italy.

== Title Holders ==
Year	Winner	Country
1990	Carla Leone	Morocco
1991	Barbara Bernardi	South Africa
1992	Erika Verolin	Australia
1993	Bianca Gagliardi	Germany
1994	Claudia Cremonese Moratto	Uruguay
1995	Anna Leticia Rizzon	Brazil
1996	Luana Spagnolo	Switzerland
1997	Loredana La Rosa	Switzerland
1998	Rudialva Vigolo	Brazil
1999	Ambra Gullà	Ethiopia
2000	Barbara Clara	Venezuela
2001	Valentina Patruno	United States
2002	Catalina Ines Acosta	Colombia
2003	Stephanie Francesca Vatta	Netherlands
2004	Silvana Santaella	Venezuela
2005	Mara Morelli	Philippines
2006	Karina Michelin	Brazil
2007	Antonella Carfi	Switzerland
2008	Fiorella Migliore	Paraguay
2009	Diana Curmei	Moldova
2010	Kimberly Castillo	Dominican Republic
2011	Silvia Novais	Brazil
2012	Aylen Maranges Nail	Argentina
