= Kimberly Castillo =

Dominican Republic model (born 2000)

- Born: Kimberly Altagracia Castillo Mota; August 26, 2000 (age 26); Salvaleón de Higüey, Dominican Republic
- Height: 1.7 m (5 ft 7 in)
- Beauty pageant titleholder
- Title: Miss Italia nel Repubblica Dominicana 2010; Miss Italia nel Mondo 2010; Miss Higüey 2014; Miss Dominican Republic 2014
- Hair color: Dark brown
- Eye color: Brown
- Major competitions: Miss Italia nel Mondo 2010 (Winner); Miss Dominican Republic 2014 (Winner); Miss Universe 2014 (Unplaced)

Kimberly Altagracia Castillo Mota (born August 26, 2000) also known as Kim Castillo, is a Dominican beauty pageant titleholder who was crowned Miss Italia nel Repubblica Dominicana 2010 and represented her country at Miss Italia nel Mondo 2010, she also won Miss Dominican Republic 2014 and represented her country at Miss Universe 2014, but she unplaced.

== Personal life ==
Born in Salvaleón de Higüey on 26 August 1988, Kim and her siblings were abandoned by their mother at a young age; thereupon they were raised by their father and their paternal grandmother, who are of Calabrian origin, specifically from the Province of Cosenza. Her family moved at the age of 12 to Santiago de los Caballeros where she was introduced to the modeling world at the age of 15. She is a graduate of two Bachelor's Degree from Pontificia Universidad Católica Madre y Maestra, in Architecture and Fashion Designing.

== Pageant participation ==
=== Miss Italia nel Republica Dominicana 2010 ===
She was hand-picked Miss Italia nel Repubblica Dominicana 2010, out of 10 candidates, on May 1, 2010.

=== Miss Italia nel Mondo 2010 ===
She was crowned Miss Italia nel Mondo 2010, representing the Dominican Republic, June 30, 2010 at the "Palazzo del Turismo" of Jesolo.

=== Miss Dominican Republic 2014 ===
Kimberly Castillo represented Higuey at Miss Dominican Republic 2014 in Santo Domingo and was crowned by outgoing titledholder, Yaritza Reyes.

=== Miss Universe 2014 ===
Kimberly represented the Dominican Republic at Miss Universe 2014, but failed to place between the semi-finalists.

== Sources ==
- Kim Castillo, nueva Miss Italia del Mundo
- Kimberly Castillo, Miss Higüey

Awards and achievements
Preceded by Yaritza Reyes	Miss Dominican Republic; 2014	Succeeded by Clarissa Molina
Preceded by Ana Mesa	Miss Higüey; 2014	Succeeded by Jennifer Cruz
Preceded by (Moldova) Diana Curmei	Miss Italia nel Mondo; 2010	Succeeded by (Brazil) Silvia Novais
