= Villa Tapia =

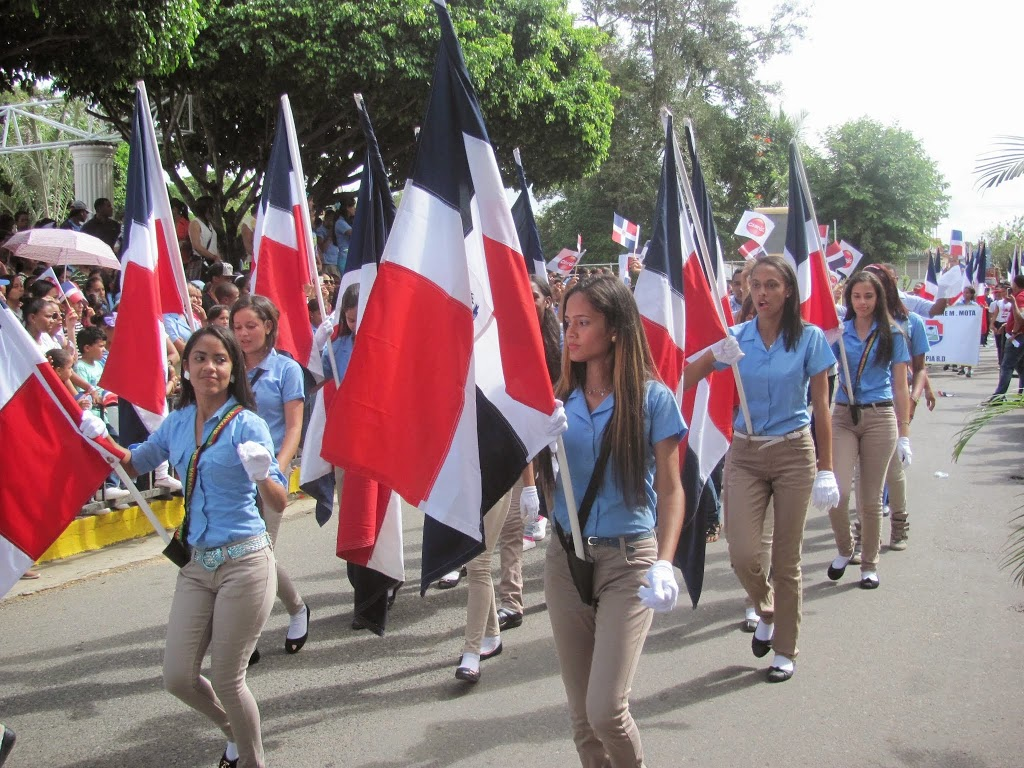
- Dominicans in Villa Tapia town

- Location within the Dominican Republic
- Coordinates: 19°18′0″N 70°25′12″W
- Country: Dominican Republic
- Province: Hermanas Mirabal
- Created as municipality: February 27, 1850

Area
  - Total: 90.12 km^{2} (34.80 sq mi)

Population (2012)
  - Total: 28,565
  - Density: 317.0/km^{2} (820.9/sq mi)
- Distance to – Salcedo: 10 km
- Municipal Districts: 0

Villa Tapia is a town in the Province of Hermanas Mirabal in the Dominican Republic.

== Sources ==
- – World-Gazetteer.com
