= Yaritza Reyes =

Dominican actress, singer, model and beauty pageant titleholder

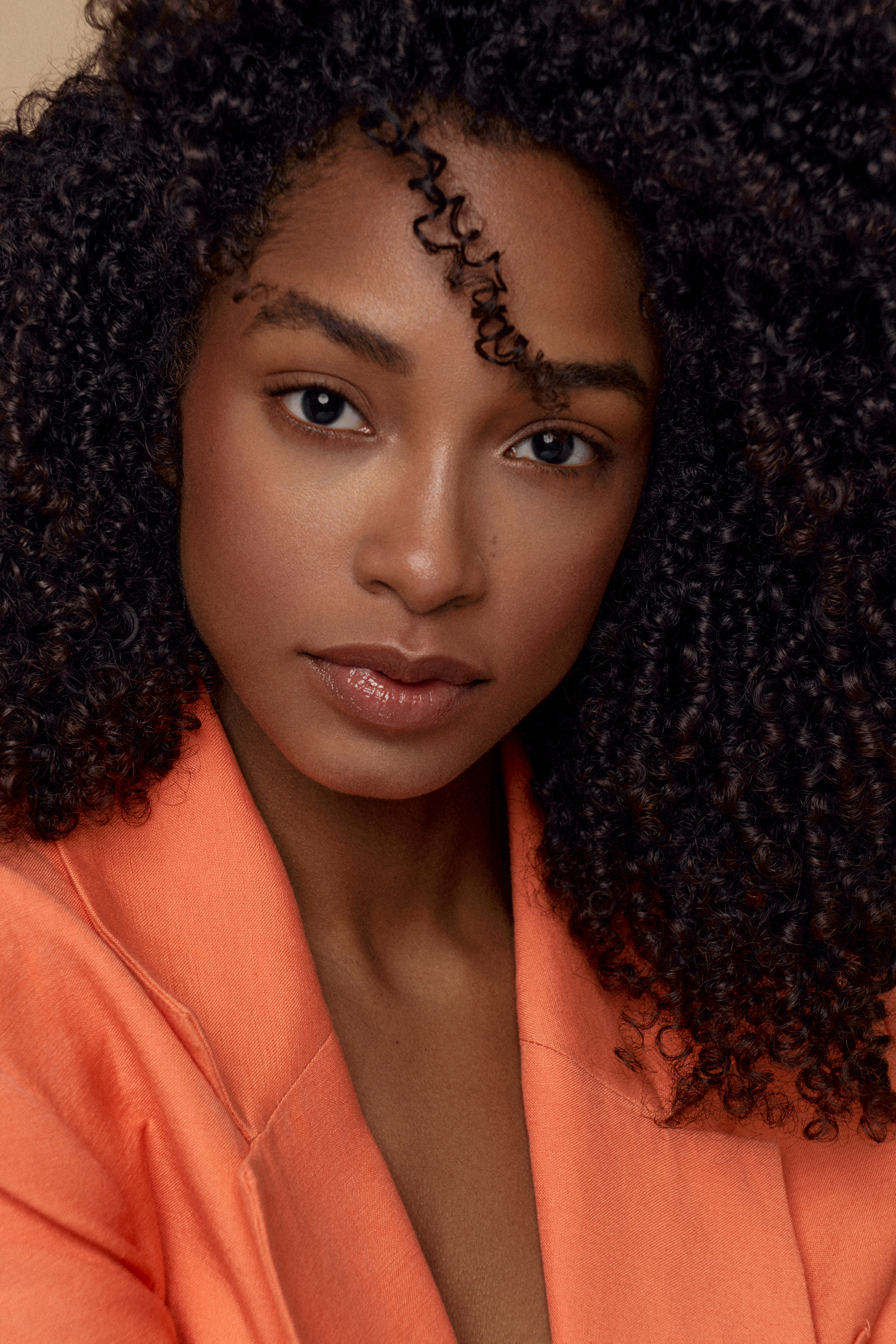
- Born: Yaritza Miguelina Reyes Ramírez; 17 December 1993 (age 32); Santo Domingo Norte, Dominican Republic
- Height: 1.77 m (5 ft 9 1/2 in)
- Spouse: Marek Zmysłowski (m. 2023)
- Beauty pageant titleholder
- Title: Miss Dominican Republic 2013; Miss Mundo Dominicana 2016; Miss World Caribbean 2016
- Hair color: Brown
- Eye color: Brown
- Major competitions: Miss Dominican Republic 2013; (Winner); Miss Universe 2013; (Top 10); Reina Hispanoamericana 2013; (Virreina Hispanoamericana); Miss Mundo Dominicana 2016; (Winner); Miss World 2016; (1st Runner-Up)

Yaritza Miguelina Reyes-Zmysłowska (née Reyes Ramírez; born 17 December 1993) is a Dominican actress, singer, model and beauty pageant titleholder who was crowned Miss Mundo Dominicana 2016 and represented the Dominican Republic at the Miss World 2016 pageant, held in Oxon Hill, Maryland, United States, where she finished as the first runner-up. She also previously won Miss Dominican Republic 2013 and competed at the Miss Universe 2013 competition in Moscow, Russia.

In 2025, Reyes took part in the 14th season of the Polish adaptation of Top Model. She was elimated from the competition in the penultimate episode, placing fifth overall.

== Pageantry ==
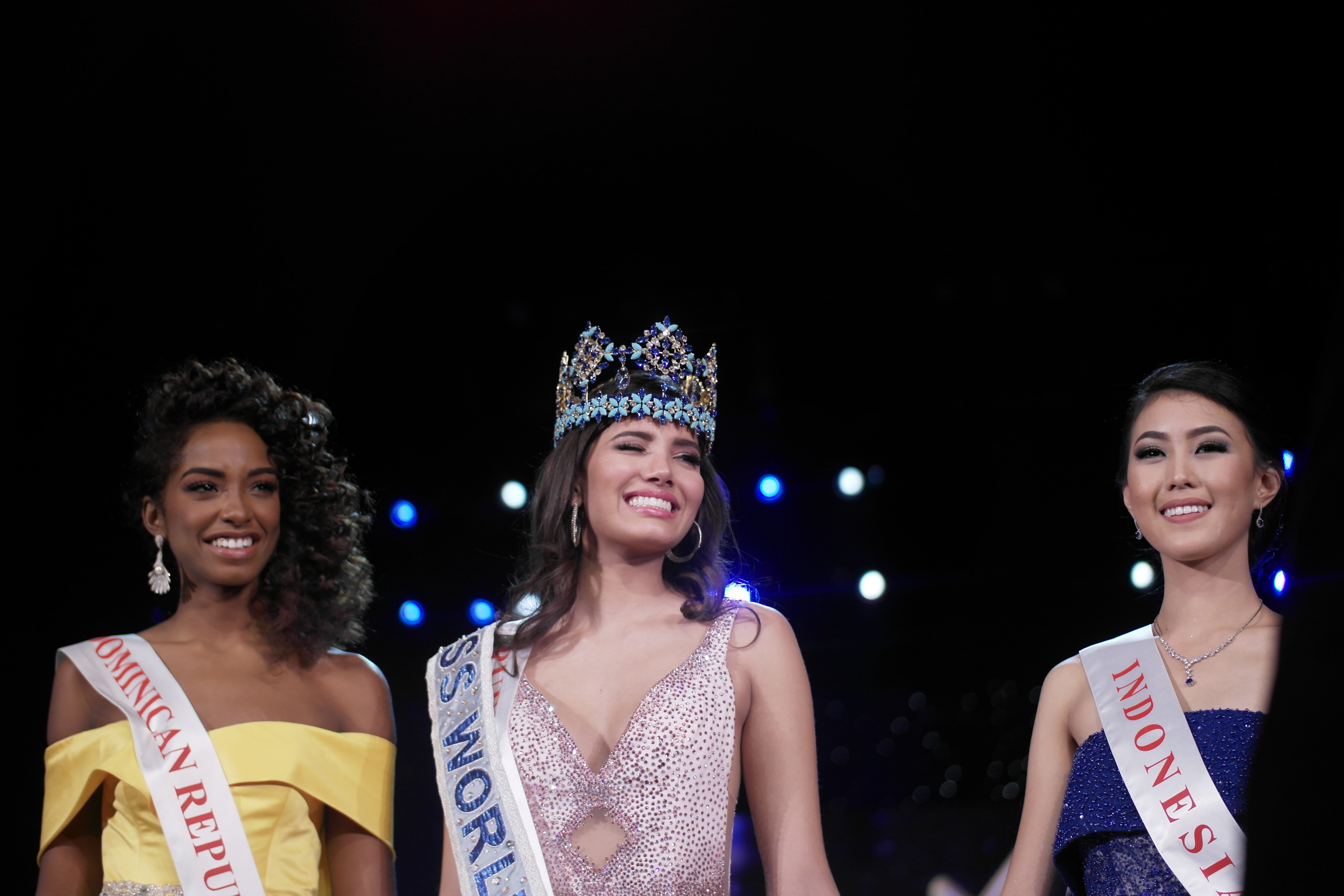
Reyes crowned Miss World America's 2016 at the MGM National Harbor, Washington, D.C., United States together with Miss World 2016, Stephanie Del Valle of Puerto Rico and Miss World Asia 2016 Natasha Mannuela Halim of Indonesia.

=== Miss Universe 2013 ===
On 3 August 2013. Reyes competed for the national title of Miss Dominican Republic 2013 representing the Elías Piña province. She was crowned as the winner and participated in the 62nd edition of the Miss Universe pageant after her victory.

She competed to succeed outgoing titleholder Olivia Culpo from the United States, eventually finishing in the Top 10. She was the third woman of predominantly African heritage to represent the Dominican Republic in Miss Universe after Ruth Ocumárez in 2002 and Ada de la Cruz in 2009.

=== Reina Hispanoamericana 2013 ===
Reyes represented Dominican Republic at the Reina Hispanoamericana 2013 pageant where she was the Virreina, Alma Álvarez was supposed to be original winner but unknown if she was dethroned. It is also unknown if Reyes was appointed, or won a pageant.

=== Miss World 2016 ===
Reyes continued her pageantry career when she competed for the title of Miss Mundo Dominicana 2016 held on 18 June 2016, where Reyes was announced as the winner. As Miss Mundo Dominicana 2016, Reyes represented the Dominican Republic at the Miss World 2016 pageant on 18 December 2016 at the MGM National Harbor in Oxon Hill, Maryland, United States.

At the conclusion of the event, Reyes ultimately finished as the 1st Runner-Up behind Stephanie Del Valle of Puerto Rico, who was crowned Miss World 2016. Reyes' first runner-up finish is the highest placement for the Dominican Republic at the Miss World pageant since Claudia Cruz achieved the same placement in 2004. Reyes was later on named Miss World Caribbean 2016 as the highest placing contestant from the Caribbean region in that year's pageant aside from the newly crowned winner. During the fast-track events prior to the coronation night, Reyes also placed in the Top 24 for both "Beauty with a Purpose" and Sport Competition.

== Modelling career ==
=== Top Model 2025 ===
In September 2025, Reyes was selected as one of the top twenty contestants for the fourteenth season of the Polish edition of Top model, hosted by Joanna Krupa. She was widely regarded as one of the season’s frontrunners, booking multiple jobs during the competition and winning Best Performance in week eight. During the cast’s international trip to Dublin Fashion Week 2025, she walked for six different designers. Despite her strong showing, Reyes was eliminated in the penultimate week of the competition alongside fellow contestants Joanna Madejska and Monika Antosz, finishing in a joint fifth place.

== Personal life ==
Reyes married Polish entrepreneur Marek Zmysłowski in 2023.

Awards and achievements
Preceded by (Russia) Sofia Nikitchuk	Miss World 1st Runner-up; 2016	Succeeded by (Mexico) Andrea Meza
Preceded by Cinthya Núñez	Miss Mundo Dominicana; 2016	Succeeded by Aletxa Mueses
Preceded by (Spain) Juliana Sampaio	Virreina Hispanoamericana; 2013	Succeeded by (Mexico) Vanessa López
Preceded by Dulcita Lieggi	Miss Dominican Republic; 2013	Succeeded by Kimberly Castillo
Preceded by Teresa Jiménez	Miss Elías Piña; 2013	Succeeded by Luz Reinoso
