= Dominican Republic–Germany relations =

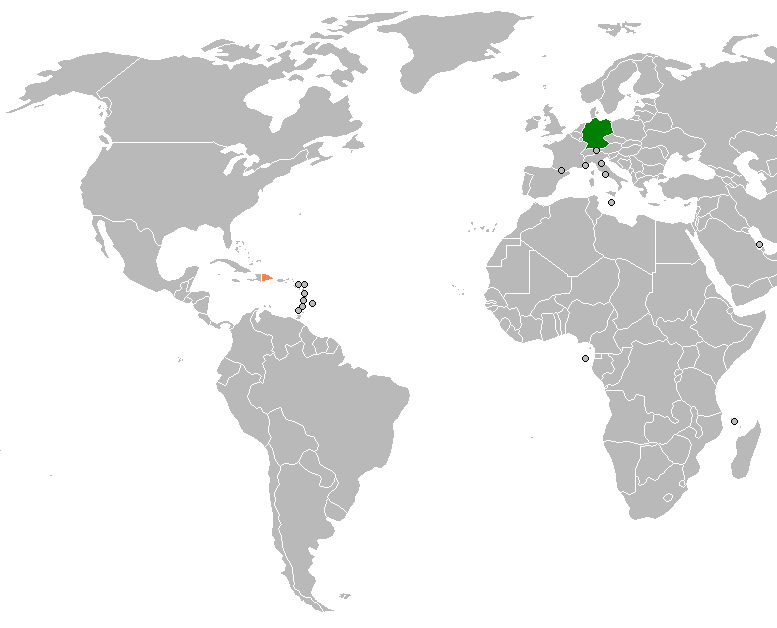

- Germany: Dominican Republic

The Centro Domínico-Alemán in Santo Domingo

Dominican Republic–Germany relations are relations between Germany and the Dominican Republic. The Federal Foreign Office describes the mutual relations as “close”.

== History ==
Contacts between the German-speaking world and the island of Hispaniola (the eastern half of which forms the Dominican Republic) can be traced back to the time immediately following the European discovery of America. In 1526, Bartolomé Flores, a native of Nuremberg, opened a trading post in Santo Domingo, where he traded in sugar, precious stones and slaves in the Caribbean, before later joining the conquistadors in Chile and Peru.

In the early 19th century, the Hanseatic city-states began to engage in trade with Dominican tobacco and establish diplomatic representations, which were later adopted by the German Empire. During World War I, U.S. concerns about German economic influence contributed to the 1916 occupation of the Dominican Republic. German property was subsequently confiscated and diplomatic relations were severed.

The Dominican dictator Rafael Trujillo was considered an admirer of Adolf Hitler, and in 1937 the German-Dominican Tropical Research Institute was founded under his aegis. At the conference in Évian on the right of asylum for European Jews, Trujillo agreed to take in 100,000 German Jews, mainly to “lighten” the population. The Jews were to replace the 20,000 Haitians he had previously had murdered. Eventually, the Dominican Republic took in just under 800 mainly German Jews in exchange for payment, who were accommodated in Sosúa, but in most cases did not stay in the country for long. Among the émigrés in Sosúa were the journalist Peter Fürst, Hilde Domin and her husband Erwin Walter Palm.

In September 1953, after the war, the Dominican Republic and the Federal Republic of Germany established diplomatic relations. However, the Dominican government never established diplomatic relations with the GDR. In 1957, both sides signed a bilateral friendship, trade and shipping treaty. In 1960, Wilhelm Helmuth van Almsick became the first West German ambassador to Santo Domingo. Since then, relations have developed positively, as evidenced by the establishment of a German-Dominican Chamber of Commerce in 1994 and the increasing number of tourists from Germany visiting the island.

== Economic relations ==
In 2024, German exports of goods to the Dominican Republic amounted to 436 million euros and imports from the country to 288 million euros. This put the Dominican Republic in 96th place in the ranking of Germany's trading partners. This makes the Dominican Republic Germany's most important trading partner among all Caribbean countries. Germany mainly exports cars and car parts, machinery and chemical products, and mainly imports food (bananas, cocoa and coffee). Almost 90 German companies operate in the country. Numerous German tourists visit the Dominican Republic. In 2017, there were around 230,000 and in 2019, just under 180,000.

Along with the United States, Canada and Spain, Germany is one of the most important donor countries in terms of development aid. The priorities of German development aid include climate protection, the promotion of renewable energies, the sustainable use of resources and the protection of local biodiversity.

== Cultural relations ==
A German-Dominican cultural center (Centro Dominico-Alemán) was established in the old city of Santo Domingo in 2001.

== Migration ==
In 2021, there were almost 11,000 Dominicans living in Germany. The number of Germans in the Dominican Republic is estimated at just under 7,000, who live mainly in the capital and on the north coast.

== Diplomatic locations ==
- Germany has an embassy in Santo Domingo.
- The Dominican Republic has an embassy in Berlin.
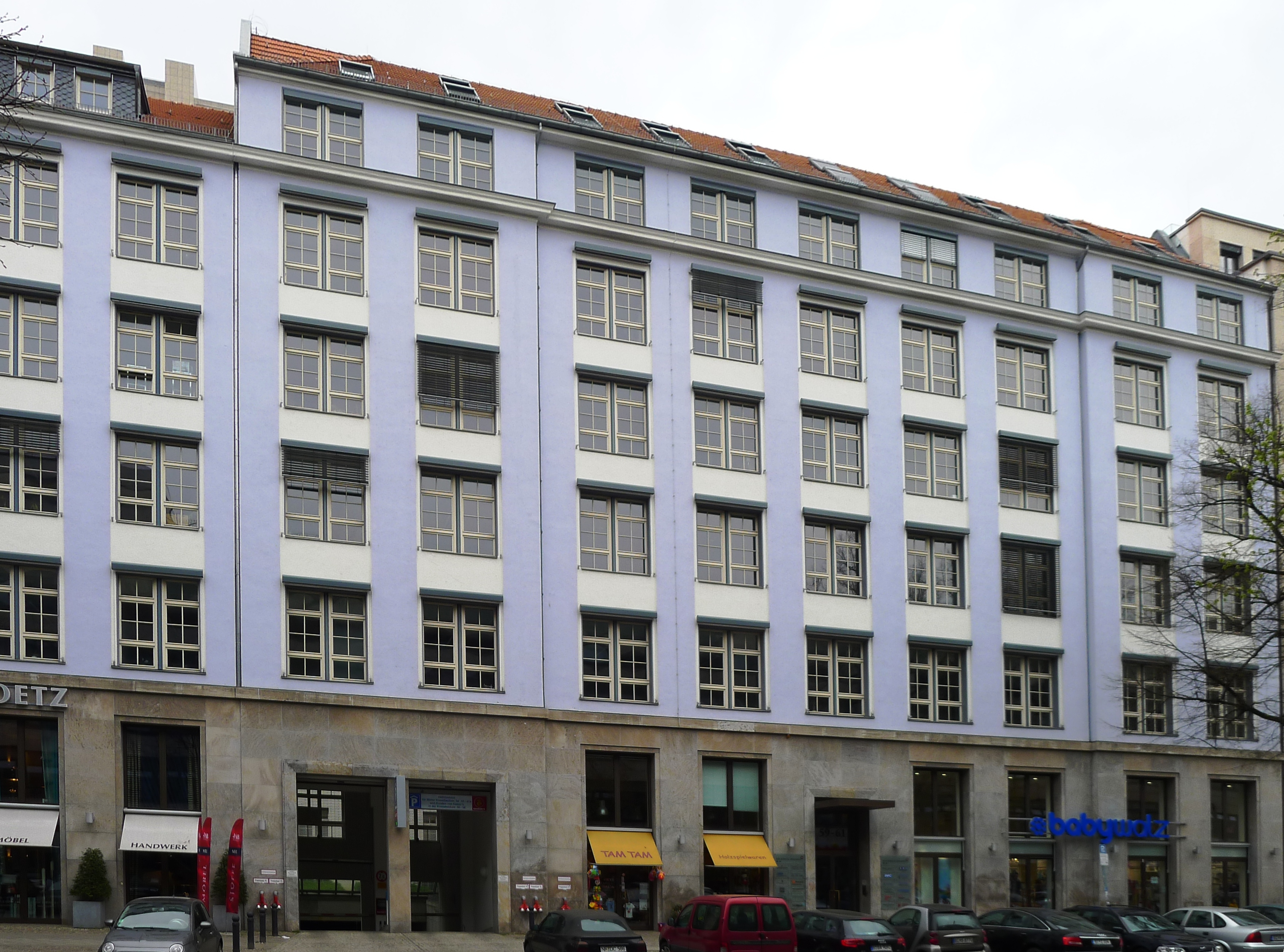
Embassy of the Dominican Republic in Berlin
