= Salcedo, Dominican Republic =

Salcedo
- Flag

- Location within the Dominican Republic
- Coordinates: 19.378°N 70.418°W,
- Country: Dominican Republic
- Province: Hermanas Mirabal

Area
  - Total: 190.6 km^{2} (73.6 sq mi)
- Elevation: 196 m (643 ft)

Population (2012)
  - Total: 45,299
  - Density: 237.7/km^{2} (615.6/sq mi)
  - Demonym: Salcedense
- Distance to – Santo Domingo: 160 km
- Municipalities: 1

Salcedo is the capital city of the Hermanas Mirabal Province in the Dominican Republic. It is the birthplace of the Dominican heroines, the Mirabal sisters, who died in the struggle against the dictator Rafael Trujillo. A museum in the town commemorates three of the sisters; it was tended to by the remaining sister, Bélgica (Dedé) Mirabal, until her death on February 1, 2014.

The city is named after Francisco Antonio Salcedo who fought in the northwestern part of the country against the Haitian army during the Dominican-Haitian War after the Dominican independence from Haiti in 1844.

== Geography ==
Salcedo is located in the Cibao Valley, south of the Cordillera Septentrional (in English, "Northern mountain range"). It has a total area of 432.95 km^{2}. It has only one municipal district (a subdivision of a municipality): Jamao Afuera.

== Climate ==
Climate data for Salcedo, Dominican Republic (1961-1990)
Month	Jan	Feb	Mar	Apr	May	Jun	Jul	Aug	Sep	Oct	Nov	Dec	Year
Record high °C (°F)	35.3 (95.5)	35.7 (96.3)	36.8 (98.2)	37.3 (99.1)	37.6 (99.7)	39.4 (102.9)	39.5 (103.1)	38.7 (101.7)	37.1 (98.8)	37.1 (98.8)	36.5 (97.7)	36.0 (96.8)	39.5 (103.1)
Mean daily maximum °C (°F)	29.1 (84.4)	29.4 (84.9)	30.7 (87.3)	31.3 (88.3)	31.7 (89.1)	32.5 (90.5)	32.5 (90.5)	32.5 (90.5)	32.8 (91.0)	32.1 (89.8)	30.7 (87.3)	29.1 (84.4)	31.2 (88.2)
Mean daily minimum °C (°F)	18.7 (65.7)	18.8 (65.8)	19.4 (66.9)	19.9 (67.8)	20.7 (69.3)	21.5 (70.7)	21.4 (70.5)	21.3 (70.3)	21.1 (70.0)	20.7 (69.3)	19.8 (67.6)	19.0 (66.2)	20.2 (68.4)
Record low °C (°F)	13.5 (56.3)	14.0 (57.2)	14.0 (57.2)	14.1 (57.4)	15.0 (59.0)	16.1 (61.0)	16.5 (61.7)	17.0 (62.6)	16.3 (61.3)	16.2 (61.2)	15.7 (60.3)	15.0 (59.0)	13.5 (56.3)
Average rainfall mm (inches)	82.7 (3.26)	73.2 (2.88)	75.7 (2.98)	107.5 (4.23)	152.7 (6.01)	79.1 (3.11)	108.9 (4.29)	131.0 (5.16)	113.4 (4.46)	124.7 (4.91)	157.9 (6.22)	134.2 (5.28)	1,341 (52.80)
Average rainy days (≥ 1.0 mm)	10.8	8.5	8.6	8.8	11.6	8.8	12.1	11.5	9.8	11.2	12.8	13.3	127.8
Source: NOAA

== History ==
In the place where is now the city of Salcedo there was a very small town with the name of Juana Núñez. It was made a Puesto cantonal (an old category that now is called Municipal District) in 1880 as part of the old La Vega province.

With the creation of the Espaillat province in 1885, Juana Núñez was made part of this new province. In 1891, its name was changed from Juana Núñez to the present one, Salcedo.

Salcedo was made a municipality in 1905 and, when the Salcedo Province (now Hermanas Mirabal Province) was created in 1952, the city became the head municipality of the new province.

== Economy ==
Farming is the only economic activity in the municipality, except for some very small industries; the main products are plantain, cassava and cacao.

== Sports ==
As of the 2025 Copa Dominicana de Fútbol season, Salcedo's Estadio Domingo Polonia (Also known as Complejo Deportivo Salcedo) has been the home of the city's first ever Professional sports team in the Hermanas Mirabal Province. In the club's first season in the Liga Dominicana de futbol, they displayed a huge upset to the 4-in-a-row 5-time Champion Cibao FC in the Finals.

== Salcedo Carnival tragedy ==
The Salcedo Carnival fire was a pyrotechnic accident that resulted in the death of 9 people (mostly children) and severe burns of 19 people.

=== Cause ===
The accident occurred after carnival participant Elvis Santos mishandled fireworks and a spark spread to the highly-flammable costumes of the victims. This led to 19 injuries and 9 deaths.

=== Fatalities ===
The accident caused nine fatalities.

- Andiel Leonardo (6 years old) – Died on March 14, 2024, at the Arturo Grullón Pediatric Hospital. His mother also suffered burns trying to save him.
- Ángel Miguel Santos Valles (13 years old) – Died on March 14, 2024.
- Yoel Alexander García (6 years old) – Died on March 16, 2024, due to severe third-degree burns.
- Henry Rosario Ortega (53 years old, the only adult fatality) – Died on March 16, 2024, at the Ney Arias Lora Burn Unit in Santo Domingo.
- Aquiel de Jesús Diloné (11 years old) – Died on the morning of March 18, 2024, while in intensive care.
- César Polonia (15 years old) – Died late on March 19, 2024, at the Robert Reid Cabral Children's Hospital after suffering a cardiorespiratory arrest.
- Jean Elvis Jiménez (8 years old) – Died of his injuries in the days following the event.
- Esteban Hernández (14 years old) – Died on March 26, 2024, with burns covering 90% of his body.
- Carlos de Jesús Blanco Ovalles (12 years old) – Died on March 27, 2024, making him the ninth and final fatality of the tragedy.

== Sister cities ==
- Atlanta, Georgia, United States
