= Santo Domingo Province =

Province of the Dominican Republic

Santo Domingo
- Province
- Location of the Santo Domingo Province
- Coordinates: 18°32′48″N 69°49′31″W
- Country: Dominican Republic
- Province since: 2001
- Capital: Santo Domingo Este

Government
  - Type: Subdivisions
  - Body: 8 municipalities 7 municipal districts
  - Congresspersons: 1 Senator; 36 Deputies

Area
  - Total: 1,302.2 km^{2} (502.8 sq mi)

Population (2022)
  - Total: 2,769,588
  - Density: 2,126.9/km^{2} (5,508.5/sq mi)
- Time zone: UTC-4 (AST)
- Area code: 1–809 1–829 1–849
- ISO 3166-2: DO-32
- Postal Code: 10700 to 11999

Santo Domingo (Spanish pronunciation: [ˈsanto ðoˈmiŋɡo]) is a province of the Dominican Republic. It was split from the Distrito Nacional on 16 October 2001. It is spread over an area of 1,302.2 km^{2} (502.8 sq mi), and has its capital at Santo Domingo Este. As per the 2022 census, it had a population of 2,769,588 inhabitants, making it the most populous province in the country.

== History ==
Santo Domingo was split from the Distrito Nacional on 16 October 2001. The province was created to include the suburbs of the national capital of Santo Domingo.

== Geography ==
Santo Domingo is one of the 31 provinces of the Dominican Republic. It is spread over an area of 1,302.2 km^{2} (502.8 sq mi). It is bordered by the Monte Plata Province to the north, San Pedro de Macorís Province to the east, San Cristóbal Province to the west and Caribbean Sea to the south. The province consists of low plains along the Caribbean Sea coast, with urbanized districts and scattered agricultural lands in the interiors. It has a long coastline.

=== Climate and vegetation ===
The province experiences a tropical climate with warmer temperatures year-round and a distinct rainy season. About 57.71 km^{2} (22.28 sq mi) of the land area is protected, and is spread across 14 protected areas. Broad-leaf forests occupy 374.2 km^{2} (144.5 sq mi) or 26.8% of the land area. Agricultural lands cover an area of 612.4 km^{2} (236.4 sq mi) in the province.

=== Administration ===
Its capital city is Santo Domingo Este, which forms part of the larger Santo Domingo metropolitan area. The province is divided into seven municipalities (municipios) and eight municipal districts (distrito municipal – D. M.) within them.

- Boca Chica
  - La Caleta (D.M.)
- Los Alcarrizos
  - Palmarejo-Villa Linda (D.M.)
  - Pantoja (D.M.)
- Pedro Brand
  - La Cuaba (D.M.)
  - La Guáyiga (D.M.)
- San Antonio de Guerra
  - Hato Viejo (D.M.)
- Santo Domingo Este
  - San Luis (D.M.)
- Santo Domingo Norte
  - La Victoria (D.M.)
- Santo Domingo Oeste

== Demographics ==
According to the 2022 census, the province had a population of 2,769,588 inhabitants, making it the most populous province in Dominican Republic. The population consisted of 1,428,589 females (51.6%) and 1,340,999 males (48.4%). About 25.9% of the population was below the age of 15 years, 66.3% belonged to the age group of 15–64 years, and 7.8% was aged 65 years or older. The province had an urban population of 2,260,998 inhabitants (81.6%) and a rural population of 508,590 inhabitants (18.4%).
