= Hermanas Mirabal Province =

Province of the Dominican Republic

Hermanas Mirabal
- Province
- Location of the Hermanas Mirabal Province
- Country: Dominican Republic
- Region: Cibao
- Province since: 1952
- Capital: Salcedo

Government
  - Type: Subdivisions
  - Body: 3 municipalities 2 municipal districts
  - Congresspersons: 1 Senator; 2 Deputies

Area
  - Total: 440.43 km^{2} (170.05 sq mi)

Population (2014)
  - Total: 121,887
  - Density: 276.75/km^{2} (716.77/sq mi)
- Time zone: UTC-4 (AST)
- Area code: 1-809 1-829 1-849
- ISO 3166-2: DO-19
- Postal Code: 34000

Hermanas Mirabal (Spanish pronunciation: [eɾˈmanas miɾaˈβal]; named after the Mirabal sisters) is a province of the Dominican Republic. It was split from Espaillat Province in 1952 and was originally called Salcedo, the name of its capital city; it is still referred to by this name sometimes.

The province is very fertile and its main agricultural product is plantain.

== Name ==
The name change came on November 21, 2007. It commemorates the Mirabal sisters, who made the ultimate sacrifice for their country by giving up a privileged life to fight against the powerful Dominican leader, Rafael Trujillo. The Mirabal sisters came from Salcedo and were buried there after they were murdered.

== History ==
The colonization process throughout the 16th and 19th centuries and the introduction of the cultivation of coffee and cocoa established the main base of the provincial economy, which came to replace the logging operations and the cattle herd, mainly in the mountainous part.

In its beginning, the province was divided between different provinces. The current provincial capital city of Salcedo belonged to the Espaillat province, while the municipality of Tenares belonged to Duarte, and the municipal district of Villa Tapia belonged to the La Vega. Due to the political instability of the time and the predominance of caudillista interests there were conflicts in the relations between Salcedo and its surrounding provinces, and it was not until April 20, 1907, when the National Congress gave the definitive limits to Salcedo.

The population took a very active participation in the construction of its park, the streets, the church, highways and roads, electrification, as well as in the important railway. The construction of the railway line was of great importance, allowing inter-provincial communication, achieving a market insertion, both nationally and internationally. Due to the progress achieved in the first half of this century, both in economic and cultural terms, allowed the creation of the Province on August 16, 1952, a Province that includes the Municipalities of Salcedo, Tenares, and the then Municipal District of Villa Tapia.

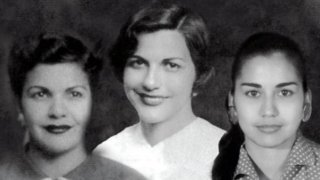
Mirabal Sisters (Hermanas Mirabal)

As can be seen, the Municipality of Salcedo had a preponderant role in the constitution of the Province, it was detached from the Espaillat province; Tenares was detached from the Duarte province and Villa Tapia from the La Vega province. The fact of the constitution in recent times of a province, from the detachment of three others, has generated problems of recognition and provincial integration that are still very much alive in the population.

On November 20, 2007, the anniversary of the murder of the Mirabal Sisters, the law giving the name of the Mirabal Sisters to the Province was promulgated.

== Economy ==
The colonization process at the end of the last century and the introduction of the cultivation of coffee and cocoa established the main base of the provincial economy, which came to replace the logging operations and the cattle herd, mainly in the mountainous part.

The flat part retains for a long time its features of large estates exploited with livestock and bananas, features that are still evident today. It is around these crops that the province's agro-export bourgeoisie is fostered, which at the same time assumes a role of supplier of inputs and goods to the peasant sector. Given the productive capacity of the soils of Salcedo, climatic and ecological conditions allow it to develop coffee and cocoa crops.

By the 1770s, the development of the production of sugar cane, coffee and cocoa became the support of the Dominican economy. The production of cocoa has a great tradition in the country, this together with the production of sugar were the main activities during the years of colonization, based on slave labor for the Spanish colonial market.

For the seventeenth century (1650), the mercantile production suffered a marked decrease, due, among other things, to the emigration of the colonizers to other Latin American countries, lack of slaves and the complete disappearance of these plantations due to the strong natural catastrophes . By this time, national production was reduced to about 650 thousand pounds per year.

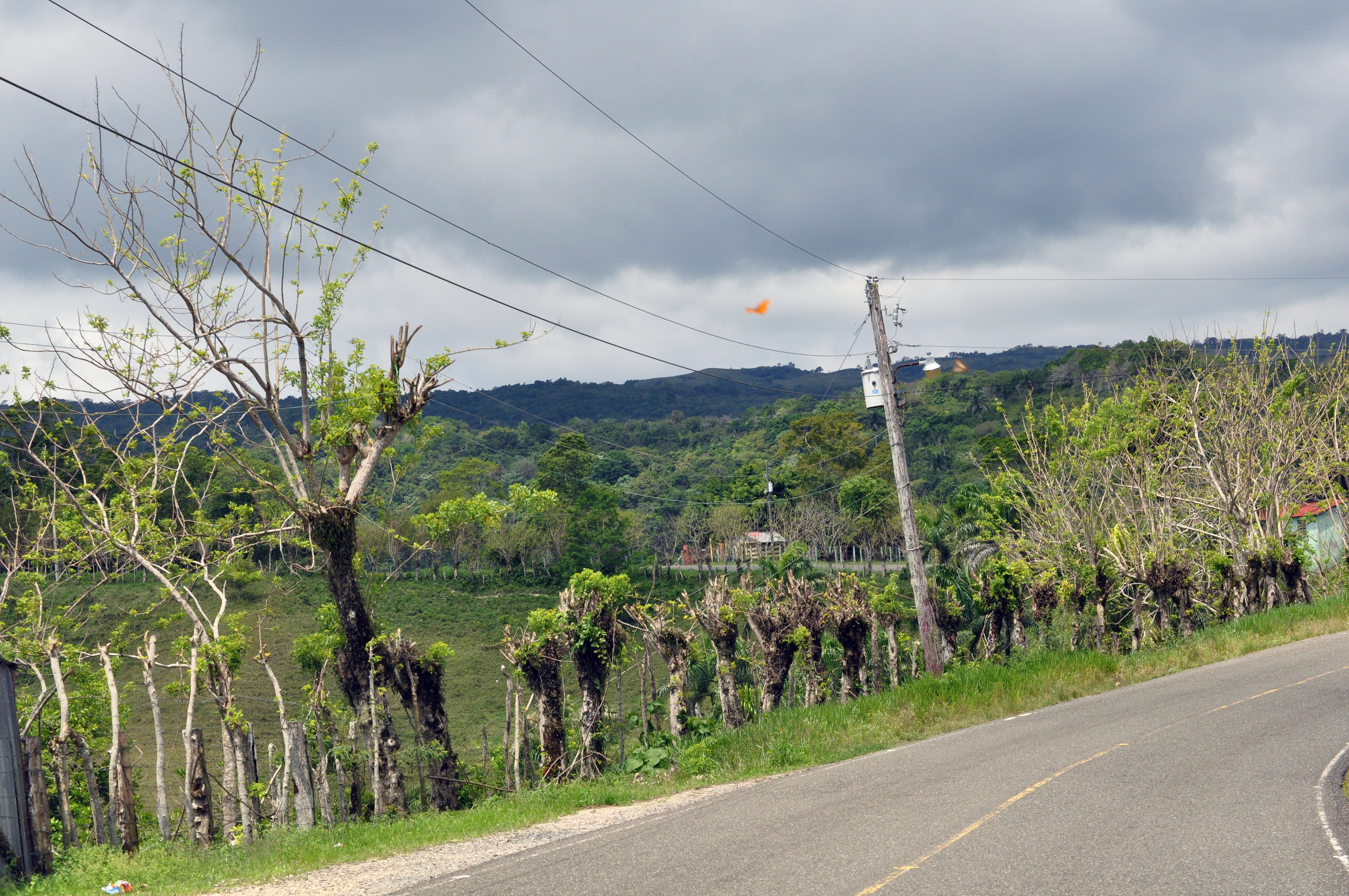
Rural street in Hermanas Mirabal province

Currently the province's economy is essentially agricultural throughout the province, the main products being banana, cassava, cocoa and coffee. In the municipality of Tenares, agriculture continues to be the main economic item, followed by services, remittances, among others. This diversification of its production, as well as social stability have been important elements for Tenares to have emerged as the provincial economic capital from the mid-1980s to the present. According to official data, this municipality reports about 50% of the province's total taxes and is the municipality with the largest presence of national and regional financial institutions.

== Municipalities and municipal districts ==
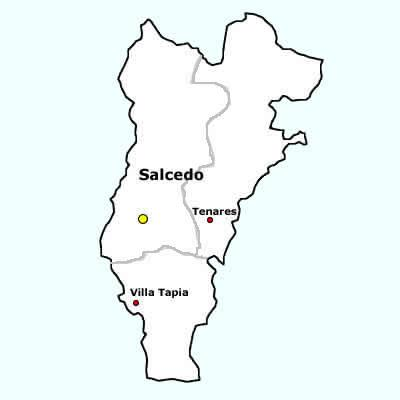
Municipalities of Hermanas Mirabal Province

The province as of June 20, 2006 is divided into the following municipalities (municipios) and municipal districts (distritos municipales - D.M.) within them:

- Salcedo
  - Jamao Afuera (D.M.)
- Tenares
  - Blanco (D.M.)
- Villa Tapia

The following is a sortable table of the municipalities and municipal districts with population figures as of 2012. Urban populations are those living in the seats (cabeceras, literally "heads") of municipalities or of municipal districts; Rural populations are those living in the districts (secciones, literally "sections") and neighborhoods (parajes, literally "places") outside of them.

Name	Total population	Urban population	Rural population
Salcedo	62,643	34,080	28,563
Tenares	30,110	19,926	10,184
Villa Tapia	30,021	14,521	15,500
Hermanas Mirabal province	121,887	67,640	54,247

== See also ==
- List of municipalities and municipal districts of the Dominican Republic
