= Santo Domingo Norte =

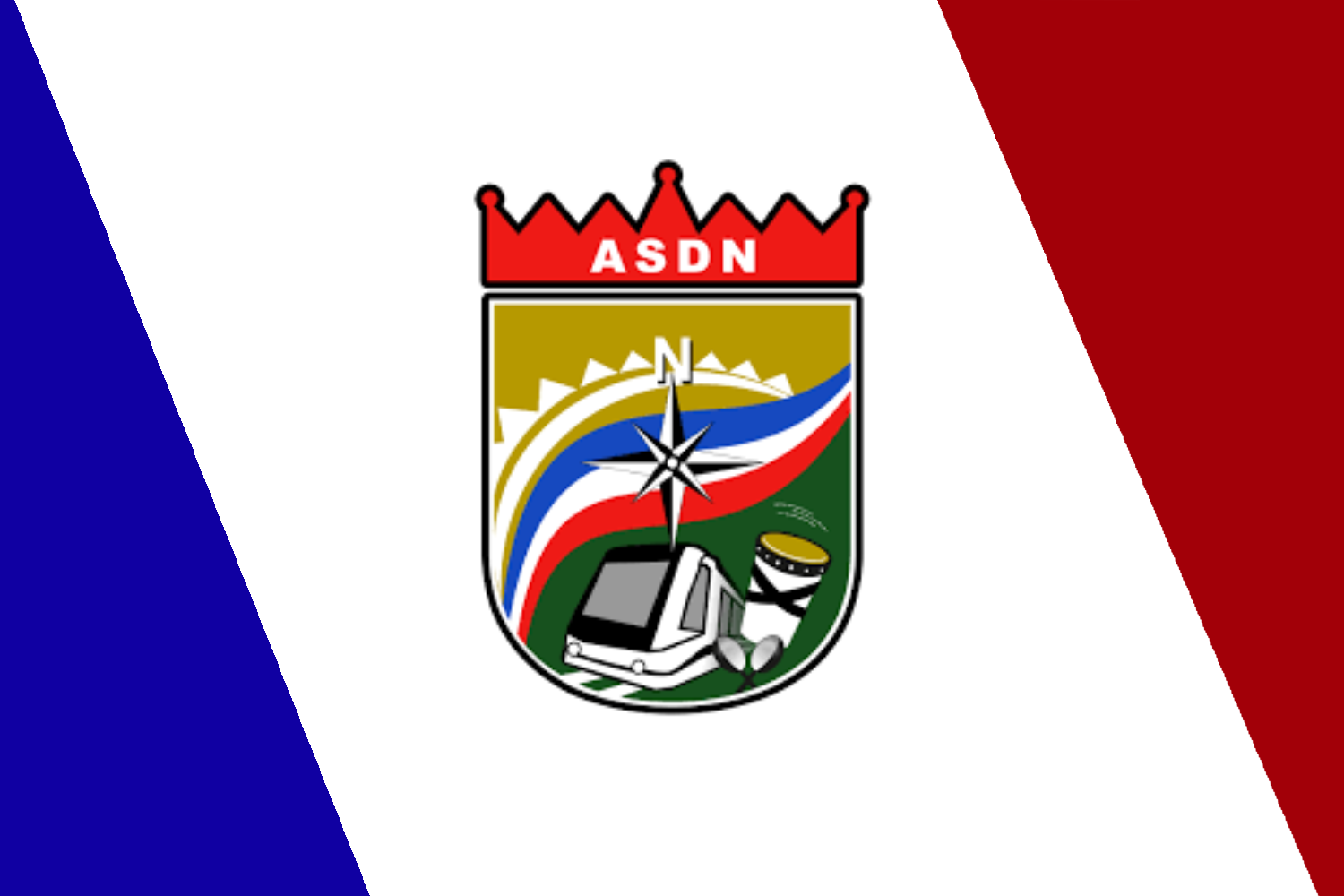
- Flag

- Santo Domingo Norte in the Dominican Republic
- Coordinates: 18°33′N 69°54′W
- Country: Dominican Republic
- Province: Santo Domingo
- Municipality since: 2001

Area
  - Total: 388.96 km^{2} (150.18 sq mi)

Population (2022)
  - Total: 674,274
  - Density: 1,733.5/km^{2} (4,489.8/sq mi)
- Municipal Districts: 1
- Website: www.asdn.gov.do

Santo Domingo Norte is a municipality of the Santo Domingo Province in the Dominican Republic. There is one municipal district (distrito municipal) within the municipality: La Victoria.

== Overview ==
Santo Domingo Norte was created as a municipality in 2001 by Law 163-01 splitting the Santo Domingo province from the Distrito Nacional including those parts of metropolitan Santo Domingo north of the Isabela River.

== See also ==
- List of municipalities and municipal districts of the Dominican Republic
