= Santo Domingo Oeste =

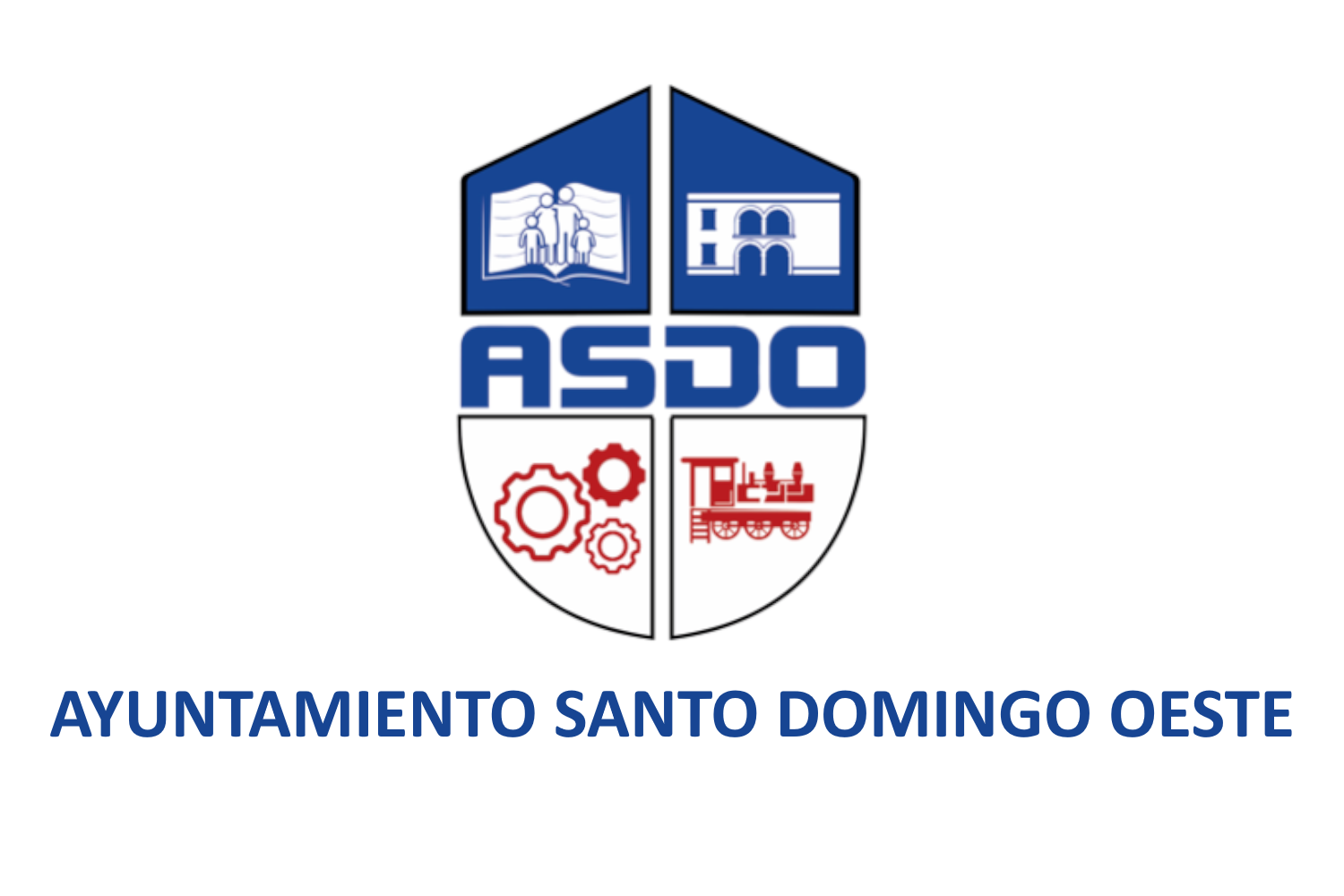
- Flag Coat of arms

- Santo Domingo Oeste in the Dominican Republic
- Coordinates: 18°30′0″N 70°0′0″W
- Country: Dominican Republic
- Province: Santo Domingo
- Municipality since: 2001

Government
  - Mayor: Francisco Peña (PRM)

Area
  - Total census: 54.10 km^{2} (20.89 sq mi)

Population (2022)
  - Total census: 410,578
  - Density: 7,589/km^{2} (19,660/sq mi)
- Municipal Districts: 0
- Website: ayuntamientosdo.gob.do (in Spanish)

Santo Domingo Oeste is a municipality of the Santo Domingo province in the Dominican Republic. It is part of the greater Santo Domingo metropolitan area, which is the de facto co-capital of the Dominican Republic as seat of the Constitutional Court and the Central Electoral Commission.

For comparison with other municipalities and municipal districts see the list of municipalities and municipal districts of the Dominican Republic.

Santo Domingo Oeste was created as municipality in 2001 by law 163-01 splitting the Santo Domingo province from the Distrito Nacional including parts of metropolitan Santo Domingo west of the DR-1 (Autopista Duarte).
