= Miss Tierra República Dominicana 2009 =

- Date: October 13, 2009
- Presenters: Themys Febriel and Wilkins Vásquez
- Entertainment: Joselito Palo Tipíco
- Venue: Auditorio del Hotel Celuisma, Puerto Plata, Dominican Republic
- Broadcaster: Super Canal Caribe 211
- Entrants: 20
- Winner: Mariel García Estevez; San Francisco de Macorís
- Congeniality: Amanda Ureña (Salcedo)
- Best National Costume: Marina Castro (La Altagracia)
- Photogenic: Mariel García (San Francisco de Macorís)

The Miss Tierra República Dominicana 2009 pageant was held on October 13, 2009. This year 20 candidates competed for the national earth crown. The winner represented the Dominican Republic at the Miss Earth 2009 beauty pageant, which was held in Manila. The Miss República Dominicana Ecoturismo will enter Miss Eco-Turismo 2009.

== Results ==
Final results	Contestant
Miss Tierra República Dominicana 2009	San Francisco de Macorís - Mariel García
Miss República Dominicana Ecoturismo	Jarabacoa - Clary Delgado
1st Runner-up	La Romana - Rosa Ortíz
2nd Runner-up	Puerto Plata - Joneydis Peña
3rd Runner-up	San Cristóbal - Carmen Torres
Semi-finalists	Distrito Nacional - Elizabeth Quiñónez; Yaguate - Orkalis Reynosa; Santiago - Anna Hernández; Com. Dom. En Estados Unidos - Ashley Pérez; Imbert - Nadia Caba

=== Special awards ===
- Miss Photogenic (voted by press reporters) - Mariel García (San Francisco de Macorís)
- Miss Congeniality (voted by contestants) - Amanda Ureña (Salcedo)
- Best Face - Clary Delgado (Jarabacoa)
- Best Provincial Costume - Marina Castro (La Altagracia)
- Miss Cultura - Eve Cruz (Haina)
- Miss Elegancia - Ashley Pérez (Com. Dom. En Estados Unidos)
- Best Representation of their Province or Municipality - Aneliz Henríquez (Azua)

== Delegates ==
Represents	Contestant	Age	Height (cm)	Height (ft in)	Hometown
Azua	Aneliz Henríquez Soto	24	171	5 ft 7 in	Santo Domingo
Bonao	Lorraine Súarez Carmona	21	175	5 ft 9 in	Bonao
Comunidad Dominicana En EEUU	Ashley Pérez Cabrera	19	170	5 ft 7 in	Miami
Distrito Nacional	Elizabeth Quiñónez Aroyo	20	171	5 ft 7 in	Santo Domingo
Haina	Eve Tatiana Cruz Oviedo	19	172	5 ft 8 in	Santo Domingo
Imbert	Nadia Caba Rodríguez	22	179	5 ft 10 in	Santo Domingo
Jarabacoa	Clary Sermina Delgado Cid	21	175	5 ft 9 in	Santiago de los Caballeros
La Altagracia	Marina Castro Medina	20	176	5 ft 9 in	Santo Domingo
La Romana	Rosa Clarissa Ortíz Melo	23	181	5 ft 11 in	La Romana
La Vega	Endis de los Santos Álvarez	24	172	5 ft 8 in	Los Alcarrizos
Monte Plata	Emeniris Tatís Guerra	25	172	5 ft 8 in	Santo Domingo
Neiba	Walesca Torres Xavier	21	173	5 ft 8 in	Santo Domingo
Puerto Plata	Joneydis Peña Vargas	22	183	6 ft 0 in	Puerto Plata
Salcedo	Amanda Ureña Zaragoza	26	170	5 ft 7 in	Salcedo
San Cristóbal	Carmen Rosa Torres Lebrón	18	172	5 ft 8 in	San Cristóbal
San Francisco de Macorís	Mariel García Estevez	20	178	5 ft 10 in	Santo Domingo
San Juan de la Maguana	Carolina Polanco Ojeda	24	175	5 ft 9 in	Santo Domingo
Santiago	Anna Hernández Taveras	18	173	5 ft 8 in	Santiago de los Caballeros
Santo Domingo Norte	Edilia Veras Inoa	19	169	5 ft 7 in	Santiago de los Caballeros
Yaguate	Orkalis Reynosa Rosa	20	175	5 ft 9 in	Santo Domingo
