= Frank Suero =

Dominican comedian and actor

- Born: Francisco de la Cruz Suero; June 4, 1960; Villa Altagracia, San Cristóbal, Dominican Republic
- Died: June 6, 2012 (aged 52); Santo Domingo, Dominican Republic

Comedy career
- Years active: ???? - 2012
- Medium: Sketch comedy Comedy; Variety
- Genre: comedy
- Subjects: Character comedy Comedy drama Talent show

Francisco de la Cruz Suero also known as Frank Suero was a Dominican comedian and actor who made several characters with leading comedians of this generation, and which, like him, have excelled, was the program producer and comedian Dime a Ve until death. Frank Suero had outstanding participation with their characters in various humorous programs of this channel, these "Atrapado", "Quédate ahí," followed by "Titiri Mundati". On Ruta Telemicro, which is carried to all the peoples of the country, was the comedian and character.

He died from complication of diabetes and hypertension on June 6, 2012.

== Characters ==
- La Sexy
- María Cristina
- Pichón
- Molongo
- El Duende

== Filmography ==
Year	Film	Role
2008	Playball	Bacalao
