= Cambita Garabitos =

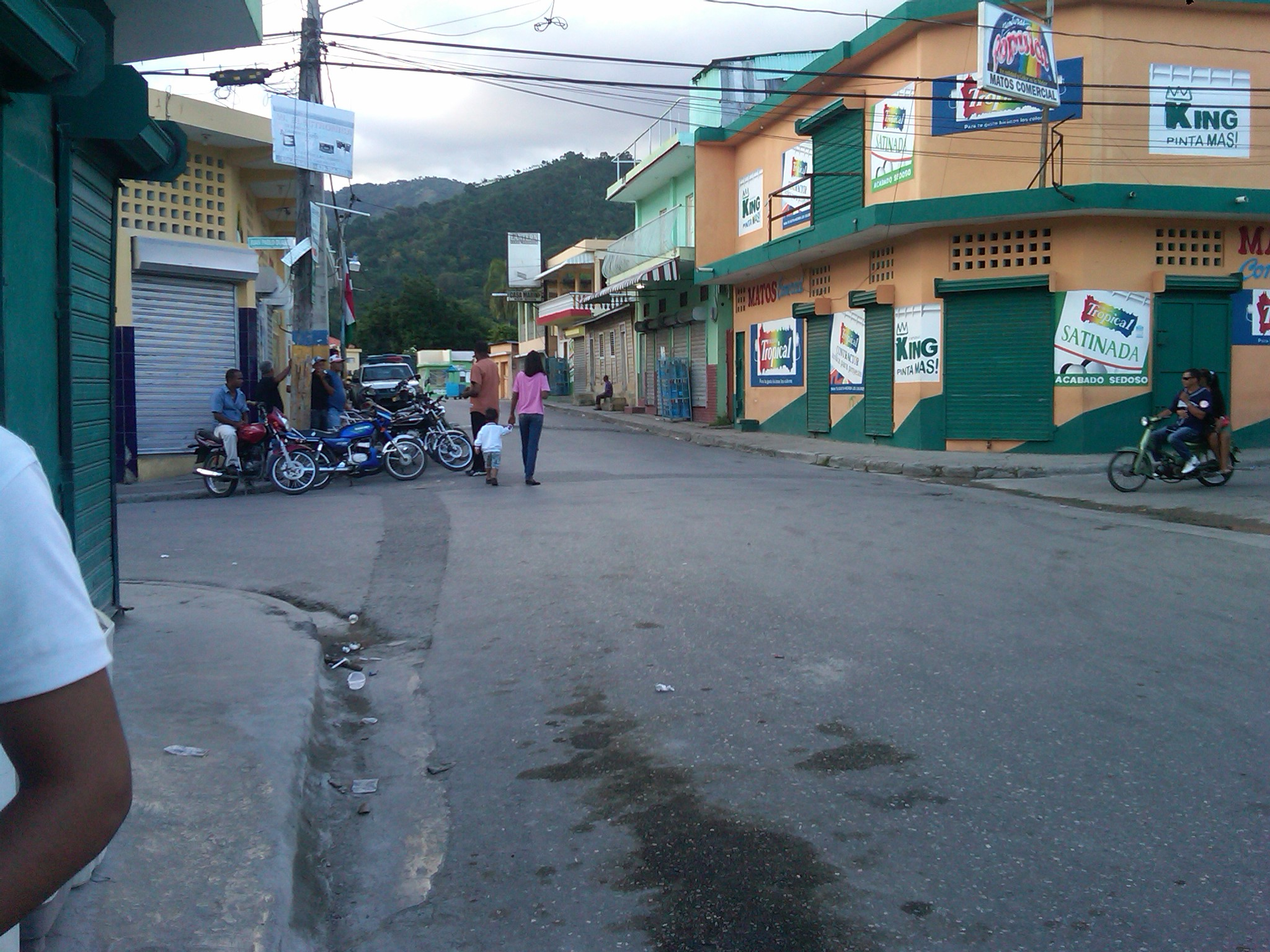
- Cambita Garabitos Dominican Republic street.

- Cambita Garabitos in the Dominican Republic
- Coordinates: 18°27′00″N 70°12′00″W
- Country: Dominican Republic
- Province: San Cristóbal

Area
  - Total: 202.52 km^{2} (78.19 sq mi)

Population (2012)
  - Total: 42,589
  - Density: 210.30/km^{2} (544.66/sq mi)
  - Urban: 12,519
- Municipal Districts: 1

Cambita Garabitos is a municipality (municipio) of the San Cristóbal province in the Dominican Republic.

As of the 2012 census the municipality had 42,589 inhabitants, 23,930 living in the city itself and 18,659 in its rural districts (Secciones). For comparison with other municipalities and municipal districts see the list of municipalities and municipal districts of the Dominican Republic.
