= Diego Caballero Sugar Mill =

The historic Sugar Mill of Diego Caballero is located roughly 8 km from San Cristobal in San Cristobal Province, Dominican Republic. The mill was originally established by Don Diego Caballero de la Rosa, who was councilor of Hispaniola (present day Dominican Republic and Haiti). The sugar mill at one point had a church with full clergy and approximately 60 stone houses for its population of African slaves, Indians, and Spaniards.

== World Heritage status ==
This site was added to the UNESCO World Heritage Tentative List on April 5, 2002 in the Cultural category.
