= List of cities in the Dominican Republic =

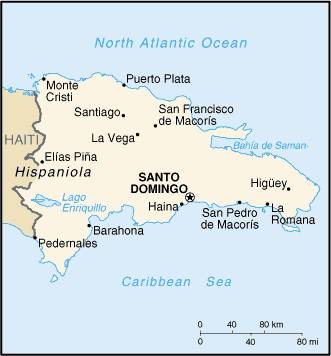
Map of the Dominican Republic

Cities in the Dominican Republic, in accordance with the definition of urban population for purposes of the 2002 census, are the urban centers and seats (cabeceras literally heads) of municipalities (municipios singular municipio), the sec level political and administrative subdivisions of the country, or of municipal districts (distritos municipales) within them.

== Santo Domingo ==
Santo Domingo may refer to Santo Domingo de Guzmán, the sole municipality of the Distrito Nacional, or the metropolitan area of Santo Domingo spread over several municipalities, which as such is not an administrative or political entity. The 2002 census does not give data for metropolitan areas. Sources give different figures for the metropolitan areas population as of 2002 ranging from 1,887,586 to 2,054,516 or 1,840,000 (2000). As the law about the creation of the Santo Domingo province, split from the Distrito Nacional in 2001, does refer to the cities of Santo Domingo de Guzmán, Santo Domingo Este, Santo Domingo Norte and Santo Domingo Oeste as former parts of the city of Santo Domingo for comparison the aggregated population of this cities is given as Santo Domingo (metropolitan) in the following table.

== Cities with population figures ==
The following is a table of cities with more than 20,000 inhabitants in the Dominican Republic. Population figures are as of the 2022 census.

City	Population	Male	Female
Santo Domingo de Guzmán	1,029,110	490,423	538,687
Santiago	561,005	270,464	290,541
Salvaleón de Higüey	415,084	207,182	207,902
La Vega	282,055	142,040	140,015
San Cristóbal	277,793	137,665	140,128
Higüey	234,233	114,381	119,852
San Pedro de Macorís	217,523	104,558	112,965
San Francisco de Macorís	202,716	100,358	102,358
Boca Chica	167,040	81,634	85,406
Moca	164,022	83,087	80,935
Puerto Plata	162,093	79,397	82,696
Bajos de Haina	159,888	77,950	81,938
San Francisco de Macorís	159,742	77,663	82,079
Baní	158,019	76,594	81,425
La Romana	153,241	73,427	79,814
Puerto Plata	146,677	71,373	75,304
Bonao	144,923	72,884	72,039
San Juan	143,009	72,664	70,345
Verón Punta Cana	138,919	71,479	67,440
Villa Hermosa	117,445	57,949	59,496
Azua	103,276	51,730	51,546
Constanza	66,316	34,335	31,981
Jarabacoa	65,059	33,139	31,920
Tamboril	57,669	28,979	28,690
Sosúa	56,982	28,144	28,838
Monte Plata	52,926	26,666	26,260
Hato Mayor	51,748	25,155	26,593
Yaguate	51,489	25,313	26,176
Bisonó	49,367	24,671	24,696
Las Matas de Farfán	48,179	24,508	23,671
Salcedo	41,340	20,948	20,392
Gaspar Hernández	40,781	20,634	20,147
Guayubín	39,653	20,587	19,066
Samaná	38,051	19,066	18,985

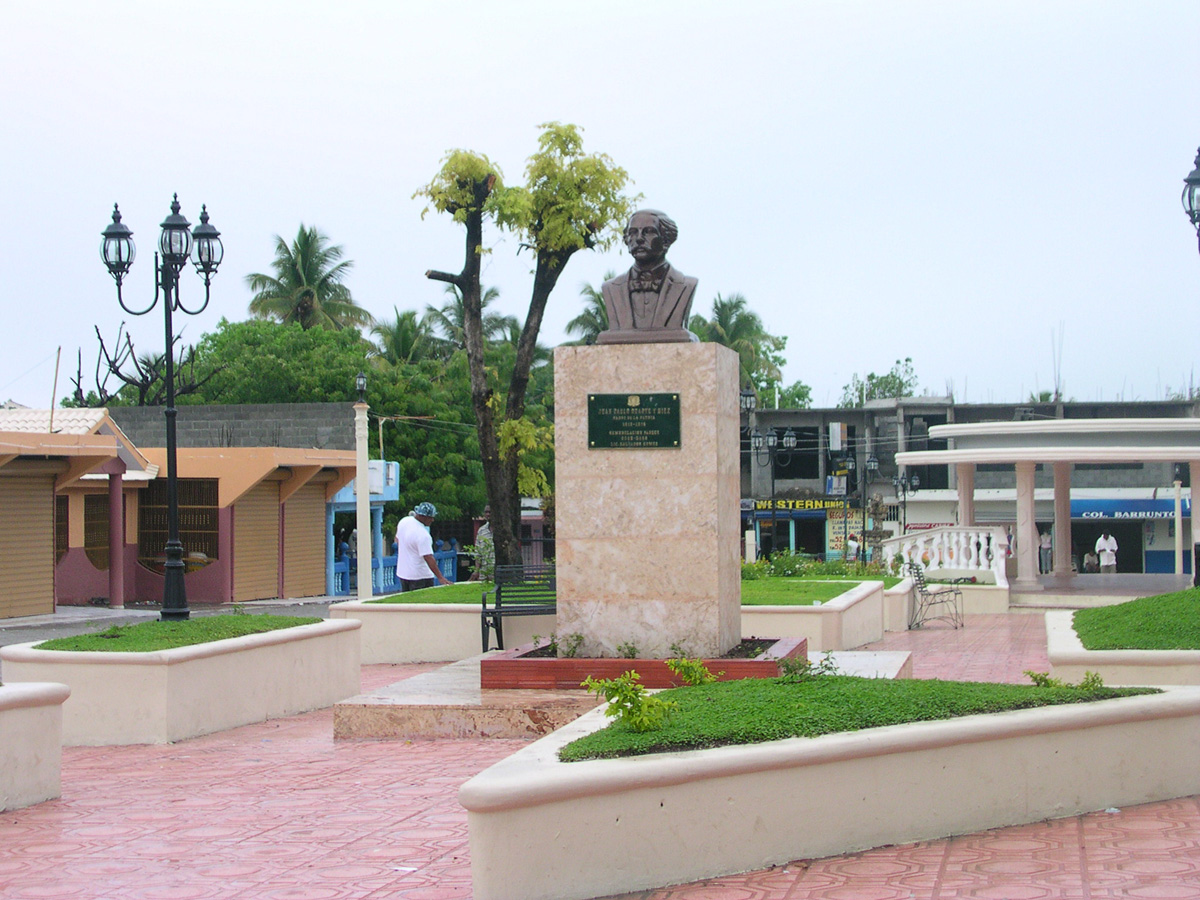
Nizao

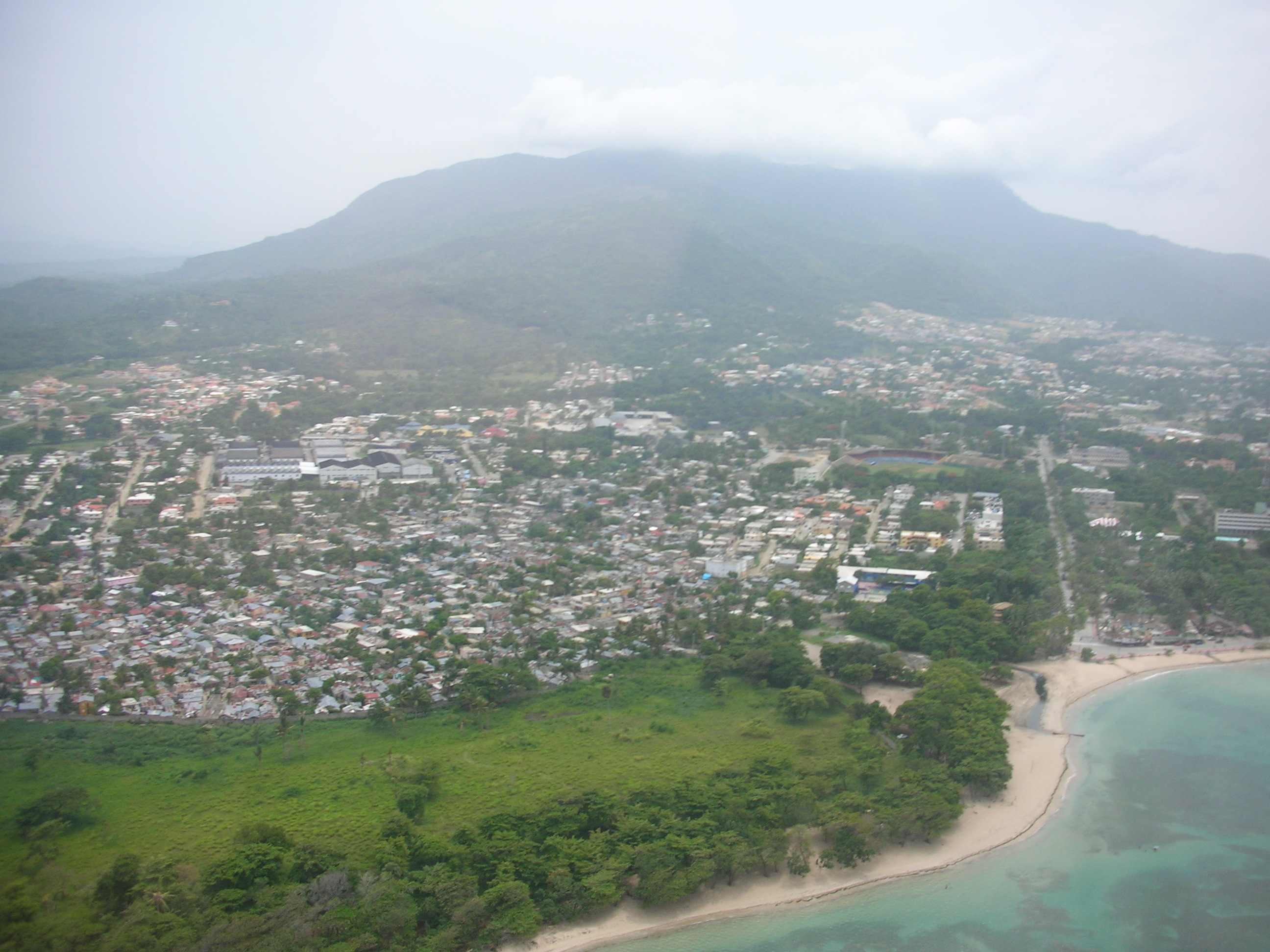
Puerto Plata

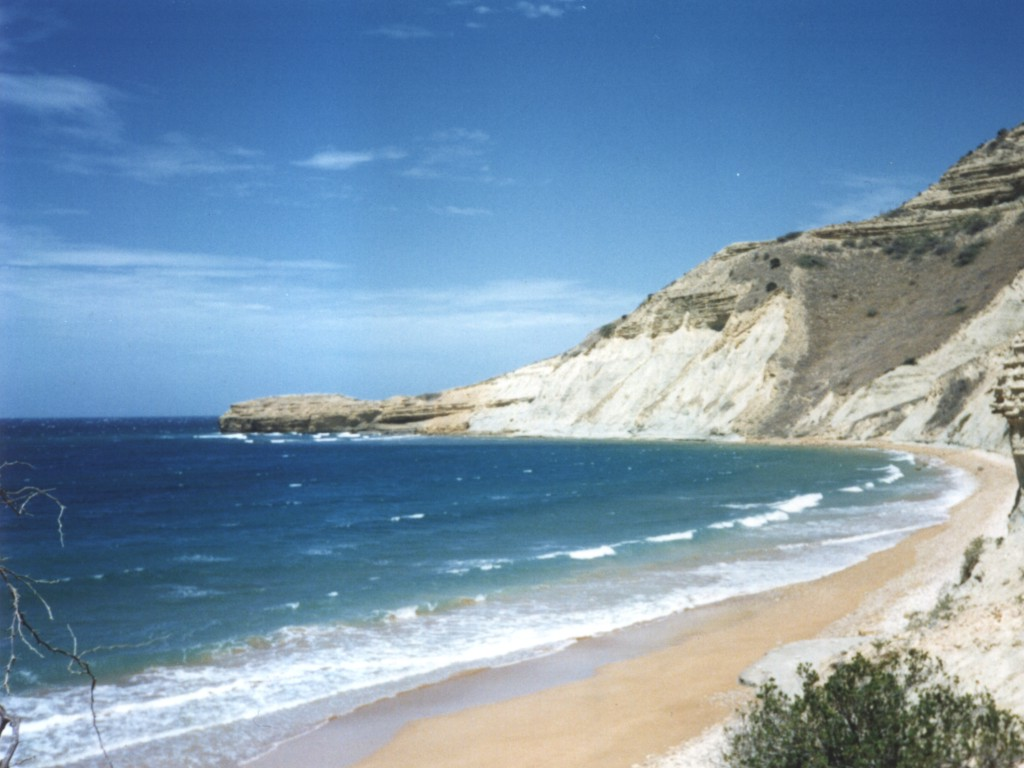
Coastline of Monte Cristi

Sources ONE.go.do

== Map ==
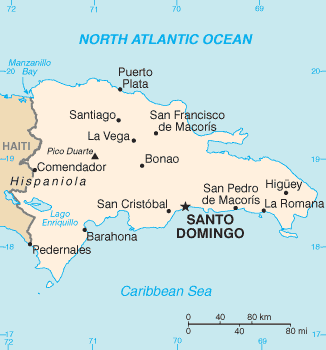
Map of the Dominican Republic

== See also ==
- Municipalities of the Dominican Republic
