= Conjunto Quisqueya =

Dominican Republic musical group

Conjunto Quisqueya is a Merengue musical band from the Dominican Republic. Active since 1972, the band has released several albums and reached international fame.

== Beginnings ==
The band was formed in the early 1970s by two University of Puerto Rico students, the Dominican Republic citizens Aneudy Diaz and Adib Melgen. They were later joined by Javich Victoria and Chuky Acosta, to form the foursome that would make the group famous.

The group of friends created the band at first to meet women and be able to get (alcoholic) drinks, according to Melgen.

The group debuted during 1972, at first appearing at the "Show de las 12" television show in Puerto Rico's canal 2.

In 1973, Conjunto Quisqueya released their first musical album, which was produced by Paquito Cordero, a Puerto Rican television and music producer.

== Success ==
One particular thing that happened to the group at first was that, since all four of their singers had lived in Puerto Rico for a long time, during their first tours as a musical group to their native Dominican Republic, their countrymen and women at first thought they were "boricuas" (slang word meaning Puerto Rican).

The band mostly played at nightclubs until they were able to score a major hit with a song named Los Limones (The Lemons), which was an international hit for the group. That song was from a release they named Aneudi y Chuky y su Conjunto Quisqueya: Que Bueno 'Ta este Pais (Aneudi And Chuky and Their Conjunto Quisqueya: This Country is Good!)

During the late 1970s and through the 1980s, Conjunto Quisqueya toured the Caribbean and other areas with their music, always returning to Puerto Rico to perform at canal 2's television shows. Another major hit during that era was Maria Cristina. La Juma (The Drunkenness), Bebo Hoy, Bebo Mañana (I'll Drink Today, I'll Drink Tomorrow), Felicitame (Congratulate Me), Lamento del Soltero (Single Man's Blues) La Banca Borracha (Drunken Bank), El Brindis (The Toast), La Trulla Navideña (The Christmas Carol), Mi Piel (My Skin) and what was perhaps the band's best known song, Dame La Mano, Paloma (Give Me Your Hand, Dove) were also major hits for the band.

Late in the 1980s and early in the 1990s, Chuky Acosta attempted a solo career with success. The group, however, continued recording and touring.

== 1990s ==
During a recording session in October of 1992, member Aneudy Diaz felt ill. He started complaining of a headache to Chuky Acosta when he suddenly fainted. After awakening, Diaz started speaking incoherently, which alarmed his band-mates and caused him to be taken to a nearby hospital for treatment and evaluation.

Diaz was diagnosed with a terminal brain tumor. The album that the group was recording was released, under the name of La Llorona Loca (The Crazy Cryer). Remarkably, despite the dire diagnosis he had been given, Diaz finished recording the album as well as the album's title song and went on tour with the band once again, also participating on a video which was recorded for La Llorona Loca. Ultimately, Aneudy Diaz died on May 28, 1993. The group then decided to take off a couple of years before performing again. They finished participating in concerts they had already been contracted to perform at before retiring for a short period, beginning in 1994. According to Melgen, after Diaz's death, the band did not feel motivated to perform anymore.

== Later developments ==
A few years later, the group returned with a new lineup, and it has performed, on and off, since. During December of 2021, Conjunto Quisqueya performed at a concert titled Noches de Navidad (Christmas Nights) in Santo Domingo.

== Members ==
Members of Conjunto Quisqueya have included:

- Aneudy Diaz
- Javish Victoria
- Abid Melgen
- Chuky Acosta
- Elias Santana

== See also ==
- List of people from the Dominican Republic
- List of Puerto Ricans
- Jochy Hernandez
