= Villa Altagracia =

- Flag

- Villa Altagracia in the Dominican Republic
- Coordinates: 18°40′12″N 70°10′12″W
- Country: Dominican Republic
- Province: San Cristóbal

Government
  - Mayor: Luis Pavolo (PLD)

Area
  - Total: 482.05 km^{2} (186.12 sq mi)

Population (2012)
  - Total: 169,655
  - Density: 351.94/km^{2} (911.53/sq mi)
- Demonym: Spanish: Villa Altagraciano (fem. Villa Altagraciana)
- Time zone: UTC−04:00
- Municipal Districts: 3
- Website: ayuntamientovillaaltagracia.gob.do (in Spanish)

Villa Altagracia is a municipality (municipio) of the San Cristóbal province in the Dominican Republic. Within the municipality there are three municipal districts (distritos municipal): La Cuchilla, Medina and San José del Puerto.

== Climate ==
Under the Köppen climate classification system, Villa Altagracia has a trade-wind tropical rainforest climate (Köppen Af). There is a definite wetter period from May to October, but even the driest months of January and February see at least 85 millimetres or 3.35 inches of rainfall.

The climate is hot, oppressive and partly cloudy. The temperature over a year varies from 65 to 89 °F (18.3 to 31.7 °C) and rarely falls below 62 °F or 16.7 °C or above 92 °F or 33.3 °C.

=== Clouds ===
With temperature that remains consistent year round, the variant between seasons is the cloud coverage. The clearer part of the year spans from November to May followed by the cloudier season starting and May and into November.

=== Rain ===
A wet day in Villa Altagracia requires 0.04 inches of liquid in precipitation. The wetter season lasts from late April to November, with 15% or more chance of being a wet day.

=== Humidity ===
The muggier season lasts for nearly 10 months, from mid March to Mid January. The comfort level is muggy at least 79% of the time.

=== Wind ===
The windier season takes place from early November into Mid May. The average wind speed during this time is 6.9 miles per hour (11.1 km/h; 6.0 kn).

Climate data for Villa Altagracia (1961-1990)
Month	Jan	Feb	Mar	Apr	May	Jun	Jul	Aug	Sep	Oct	Nov	Dec	Year
Record high °C (°F)	34.4 (93.9)	38.0 (100.4)	35.0 (95.0)	36.0 (96.8)	38.0 (100.4)	38.2 (100.8)	38.0 (100.4)	38.0 (100.4)	38.0 (100.4)	38.0 (100.4)	35.3 (95.5)	35.0 (95.0)	38.2 (100.8)
Mean daily maximum °C (°F)	29.4 (84.9)	29.6 (85.3)	30.4 (86.7)	30.8 (87.4)	30.9 (87.6)	31.1 (88.0)	31.5 (88.7)	31.5 (88.7)	31.8 (89.2)	31.5 (88.7)	30.6 (87.1)	29.5 (85.1)	30.7 (87.3)
Mean daily minimum °C (°F)	19.2 (66.6)	19.0 (66.2)	19.1 (66.4)	19.5 (67.1)	20.1 (68.2)	20.6 (69.1)	20.7 (69.3)	20.9 (69.6)	20.7 (69.3)	20.5 (68.9)	20.3 (68.5)	19.6 (67.3)	20.0 (68.0)
Record low °C (°F)	12.5 (54.5)	12.0 (53.6)	12.0 (53.6)	12.5 (54.5)	12.0 (53.6)	17.0 (62.6)	17.0 (62.6)	17.0 (62.6)	17.0 (62.6)	15.5 (59.9)	13.5 (56.3)	6.8 (44.2)	6.8 (44.2)
Average rainfall mm (inches)	86.2 (3.39)	91.3 (3.59)	119.3 (4.70)	156.8 (6.17)	240.0 (9.45)	239.8 (9.44)	245.5 (9.67)	291.1 (11.46)	250.5 (9.86)	270.4 (10.65)	172.8 (6.80)	105.8 (4.17)	2,269.5 (89.35)
Average rainy days (≥ 1.0 mm)	9.8	8.1	8.9	10.1	15.0	13.7	15.2	15.8	15.3	15.2	12.7	10.7	150.5
Source: NOAA

== Notable people ==
- Frank Suero (1960–2012), Dominican comedian and actor
