= Michael Pineda =

Dominican baseball player (born 1989)

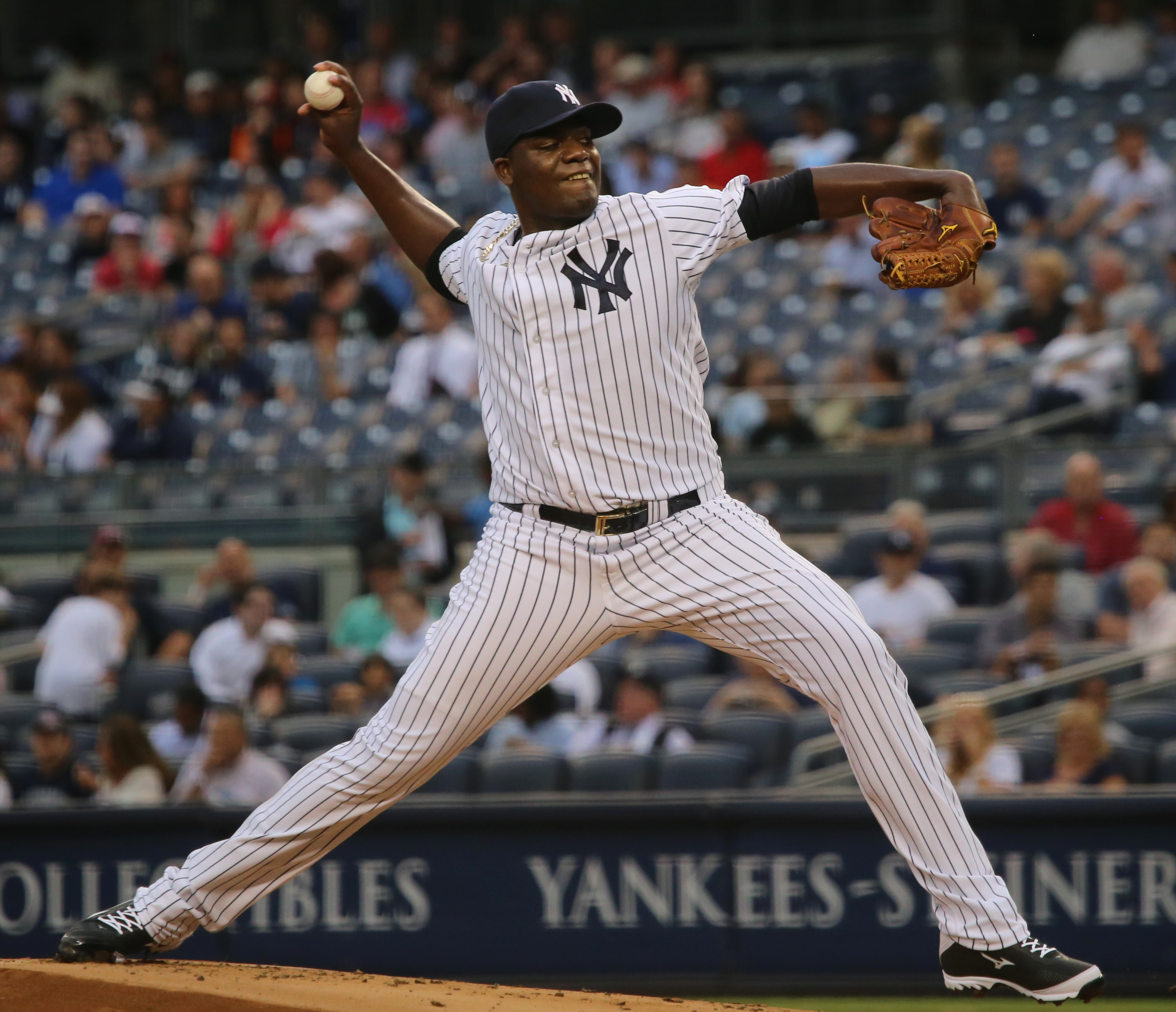
- Pineda with the New York Yankees
- Pitcher
- Born: January 18, 1989 (age 37); Yaguate, San Cristóbal, Dominican Republic
- Batted: Right Threw: Right

MLB debut
- April 5, 2011, for the Seattle Mariners

Last MLB appearance
- September 3, 2022, for the Detroit Tigers

MLB statistics
- Win–loss record: 64–61
- Earned run average: 4.06
- Strikeouts: 966
- Stats at Baseball Reference

Teams
- Seattle Mariners (2011); New York Yankees (2014–2017); Minnesota Twins (2019–2021); Detroit Tigers (2022)

Career highlights and awards
- All-Star (2011)

Michael Francisco Pineda Paulino (born January 18, 1989) is a Dominican former professional baseball pitcher. He played in Major League Baseball (MLB) for the Seattle Mariners, New York Yankees, Minnesota Twins, and Detroit Tigers.

Pineda signed as an international free agent with the Mariners in 2005, and made his MLB debut for the Mariners in 2011. In his rookie season he was named an All-Star and finished fifth in balloting for American League Rookie of the Year. After his rookie season, he was traded to the Yankees. He missed the 2012 and 2013 seasons due to a series of shoulder injuries. Pineda's 2017 season ended when he underwent Tommy John surgery, which kept him out for the entire 2018 season. He returned to MLB with the Twins in 2019 and signed with Detroit for the 2022 season.

== Early life ==
Pineda grew up in Yaguate, Dominican Republic. His father is a welder and his mother is a hair stylist. Pineda is the oldest of five children.

== Professional career ==
=== Seattle Mariners ===
==== Minor leagues (2005–2010) ====
Pineda signed with the Seattle Mariners of Major League Baseball (MLB) at age 16 on December 12, 2005. He received a $35,000 signing bonus. Pineda made his professional debut with the Mariners of the Rookie-level Dominican Summer League (DSL) in 2006, pitching to a 2–1 win–loss record with a 0.44 earned run average (ERA), allowing only one earned run all season. In 2007, he had a 6–1 record with a 2.29 ERA in regular action for the DSL Mariners. Pineda pitched for the Wisconsin Timber Rattlers of the Class-A Midwest League in 2008 and had an 8–6 record with a 1.95 ERA. Opponents had a batting average of .216 against Pineda. He led the Seattle farm system in ERA, opponent average and strikeouts (128). Baseball America rated Pineda as the Mariners' tenth best prospect while the Mariners organization named him their Minor League Pitcher of the Year. Wisconsin pitching coach Jaime Navarro became Pineda's mentor.

Pineda battled injuries during the 2009 season, missing most of the year due to elbow strain. He was 4–2 with a 2.84 ERA for the High Desert Mavericks of the Class A-Advanced California League while healthy and threw three shutout innings for the Mariners of the Rookie-level Arizona League. He struck out 52 in 47 1/3 innings pitched (IP) for the year.

Before the 2010 season, Baseball America ranked Pineda as the Mariners' sixth best prospect. Back in good health in 2010, Pineda was 8–1 with a 2.22 ERA for the West Tenn Diamond Jaxx of the Class-AA Southern League with 78 strikeouts and 17 walks in 77 IP and 3–3 with a 4.76 ERA for the Tacoma Rainiers of the Class-AAA Pacific Coast League with 76 strikeouts and 17 walks in 62 1/3 IP. The Mariners front office ended his season when he reached 140 IP as a precaution against injury. The Mariners again named Pineda their Minor League Pitcher of the Year in 2010, and he was a finalist for the USA Today Minor League Player of the Year.

Baseball America rated Pineda as the second best prospect in the Mariners' system before the 2011 season. Baseball America also rated him the sixteenth best prospect in all of baseball.

=== 2011: MLB debut, All-Star ===
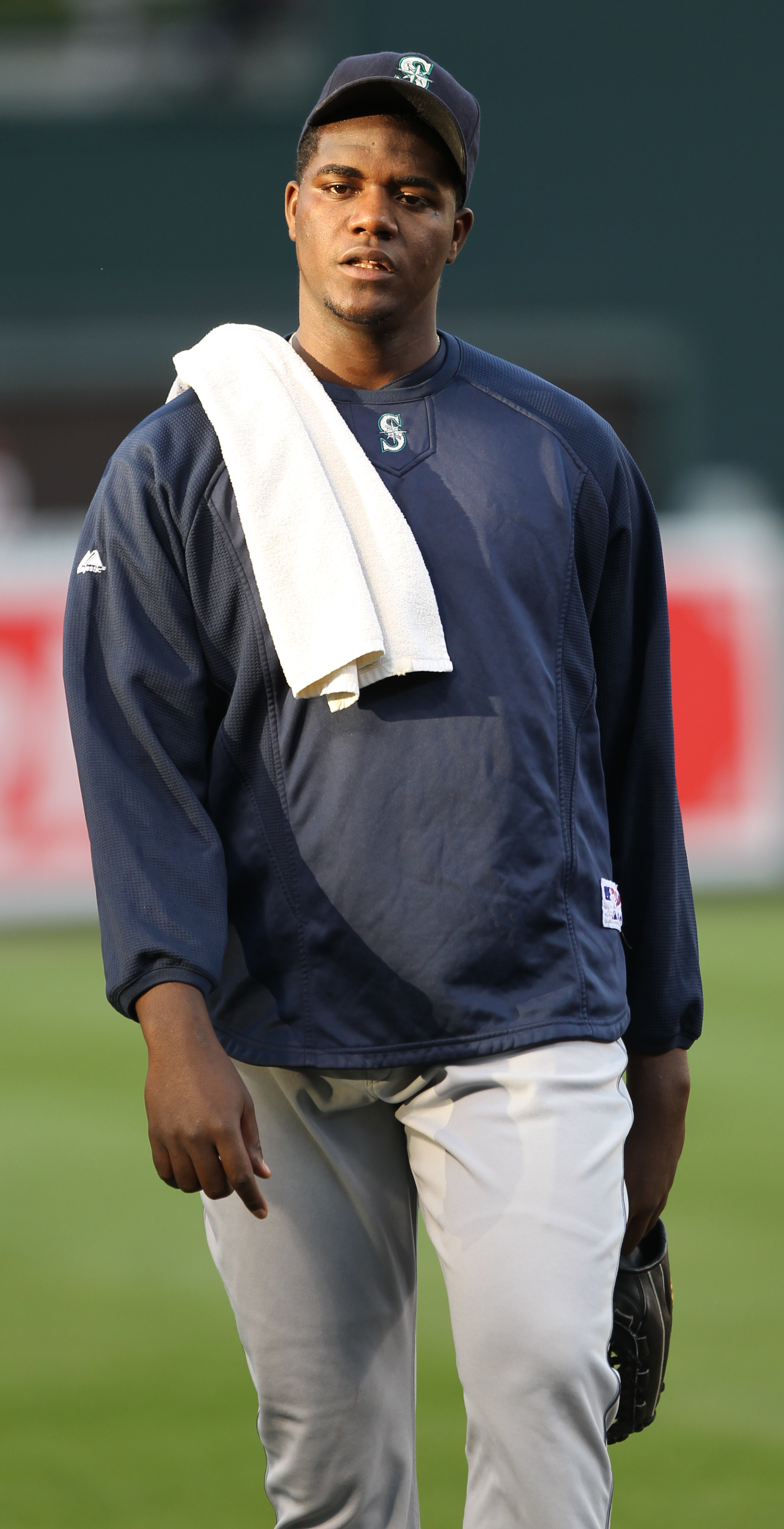
Pineda with the Seattle Mariners in 2011

Pineda made the Mariners' starting rotation out of spring training 2011 as the number five starter, the third youngest player on a 2011 American League opening day roster after Chris Sale and Tim Collins. He made his MLB debut on April 5, giving up three runs in six innings in a loss. Pineda pitched 7 1/3 innings, allowed two runs, struck out seven batters, and earned his first MLB win on April 12, 2011. Pineda struck out a career high nine batters against the Detroit Tigers on April 28, including the first four batters he faced. He ended his first month in the majors with a 4–1 record and a 2.01 ERA. He was named American League Rookie of the Month for April 2011, pitching at least six innings in his first five starts, giving up only 22 hits and 12 walks over 31 1/3 innings, while striking out 30 opposing batters.

Pineda was selected to the All-Star Game on July 10 as a replacement for Justin Verlander, who was ineligible to pitch in the All-Star Game due to having pitched the day before the All-Star break. He was 8–6 at that point with a 3.03 ERA and 113 strikeouts and 36 walks in 113 innings. In the All-Star Game, Pineda pitched one perfect inning, striking out Scott Rolen and Rickie Weeks.

Pineda finished the 2011 season with a 9–10 record and a 3.74 ERA. He recorded no wins in his final seven starts over the last two months of the year, and the Mariners cut back his workload as a precaution against an arm injury. In 28 starts, he struck out 173 hitters while walking just 55 over 171 innings. Pineda struck out 24.9% of all batters faced, which was the third highest strikeout percentage in MLB. He also finished fifth in voting for American League Rookie of the Year Award, behind Jeremy Hellickson, Mark Trumbo, Eric Hosmer, and Iván Nova, and ahead of teammate Dustin Ackley, who finished sixth. After the season, Keith Law ranked Pineda as the 20th best player under the age of 25.

=== New York Yankees ===
==== 2012–2014 ====
The Mariners traded Pineda to the New York Yankees with José Campos, for Jesús Montero and Héctor Noesí on January 13, 2012. The Yankees needed a top-tier starting pitcher to pair with CC Sabathia, and the Mariners felt they could afford to part with Pineda because of their depth of top-tier pitching prospects, including Danny Hultzen, James Paxton, and Taijuan Walker.

Pineda was placed on the 15-day disabled list with tendinitis in his right shoulder at the culmination of spring training, causing him to miss the start of the 2012 season. During his rehabilitation, he suffered an anterior labral tear in his right shoulder. He underwent arthroscopic surgery on May 1, 2012, and was ruled out for the 2012 season.

Pineda began the 2013 season on the 60-day DL as he was still recovering from the shoulder surgery. He was activated from the disabled list on July 8, 2013, and optioned to the minor leagues, where he pitched for the Scranton/Wilkes-Barre RailRiders of the Class AAA International League. In six games pitched for the RailRiders, Pineda had a 1–1 record and a 3.86 ERA.

Pineda competed for a spot in the Yankees' starting rotation during spring training in 2014. He was named the Yankees' fifth starter towards the end of spring training. He made his first start for the Yankees on April 5, 2014. On April 10, during a start against the Boston Red Sox, Boston broadcasters noticed a substance that appeared to be pine tar on the palm of Pineda's pitching hand in the early innings of the game. Midway through Pineda's outing, the substance was wiped from his hand only to be added to his wrist. The umpires of the game were never notified and no action was taken against Pineda, who told reporters after the game that the substance on his hand was dirt. On April 23, 2014, during Pineda's next game against the Red Sox, Red Sox manager John Farrell notified the umpires about pine tar on Pineda's neck, and he was ejected from the game in the second inning. Pineda was suspended for 10 games for the incident. He had a 1.83 ERA in 19 2/3 innings pitched across his first four starts.

While pitching in a simulated game during the suspension, Pineda developed a strain in his teres major muscle, which was expected to require three to four weeks to heal. Following inflammation experienced in late May, Pineda's return was pushed back to August. The Yankees activated Pineda to start on August 13. Pineda finished the season with a 5–5 record and a 1.89 ERA in 76 1/3 innings.

==== 2015–2017 ====
Eligible for salary arbitration for the first time, Pineda and the Yankees agreed on a $2.1 million salary for the 2015 season. On May 10, 2015, in a win against the Baltimore Orioles, Pineda struck out a career-high 16 batters over seven innings while also walking none, breaking his previous career-high of 10 strikeouts in a single game. He also became the first pitcher since Johan Santana in 2007 with 16 strikeouts and no walks in a single game. Pineda went on the disabled list on July 30 due to a strained flexor muscle in his right forearm. He finished the season with a 12–10 record and a 4.37 ERA in 160 2/3 innings across 27 games started.

In 2016, Pineda and the Yankees again agreed on a contract figure without going to arbitration. Pineda earned $4.3 million. Pineda finished the 2016 season with a 6–12 record and a career-worst 4.82 ERA. He made a career-high 32 starts, pitched a career-high 175 2/3 innings and recorded a career-high 207 strikeouts while walking only 53. He led the American League with an average of 10.6 strikeouts per nine innings pitched. However, he also allowed 27 home runs.

Pineda and the Yankees agreed on a $7.4 million salary for the 2017 season, his last before qualifying for free agency. During the Yankees home opener against the Tampa Bay Rays on April 10, Pineda retired the first 20 batters until giving up a double to Evan Longoria. Pineda finished with 11 strikeouts and allowed one run in 7 2/3 innings as the Yankees won 8–1.

On July 14, Pineda was diagnosed with a partial tear of his ulnar collateral ligament and a flexor strain in his right elbow. He underwent Tommy John surgery on July 18, ending his season. Prior to the injury, Pineda went 8–4 with a 4.39 ERA. He became a free agent after the season.

=== Minnesota Twins (2018–2021) ===
On December 13, 2017, Pineda signed a two-year, $10 million contract with the Minnesota Twins. On February 17, 2018, Pineda was placed on the 60-day disabled list while he recovered from Tommy John surgery. On August 28, manager Paul Molitor revealed that Pineda would not pitch at all in 2018 due to a torn meniscus in his right knee.

Pineda began the 2019 season with the Twins, allowing 2 runs in nine innings over his first two starts. On May 28, Pineda was placed on the 10-day injured list with right knee tendinitis. Pineda pitched to a 11–5 record and a 4.01 ERA, before he received a 60-game suspension without pay for testing positive for hydrochlorothiazide, a diuretic commonly prescribed for blood pressure, on September 7. The suspension had been reduced from 80 to 60 games on appeal, because a compelling case was made that it was not used as a masking agent for a performance-enhancing drug. Pineda subsequently released a statement that read, in part: "I mistakenly took a medication that was given to me by a close acquaintance, who obtained it over-the-counter and assured me it would safely help me manage my weight. I ingested a few of these pills without the consent of the Twins' training staff. Testing revealed trace elements of a substance called hydrochlorothiazide, which is a banned diuretic under baseball's testing program."

On December 10, 2019, Pineda re-signed with the Twins on a two-year, $20 million contract . On September 1, 2020, Pineda returned from his suspension and led the Twins to a 3–2 victory over the Chicago White Sox. In five games in 2020, Pineda recorded a 2–0 record and 3.38 ERA with 25 strikeouts in 26 2/3 innings pitched. Pineda pitched 22 games (21 starts) in 2021 with a 9–8 record, 3.62 ERA and 88 strikeouts through 109 1/3 innings.

=== Detroit Tigers (2022) ===
On March 19, 2022, Pineda signed a one-year, $5.5 million contract with the Detroit Tigers. Pineda fractured his right middle finger on May 15 and was placed on the 15-day injured list. He returned from the injured list on July 1. He left a game on July 23 with pain in his right triceps and returned to the injured list. The Tigers activated him for a start on September 1, and designated him for assignment on September 4. Pineda was 2–7 with a 5.79 ERA in 11 games started, pitching 46 2/3 innings. He cleared waivers and became a free agent on September 6.

== Scouting profile ==
Pineda is listed at 6 feet 7 inches (2.01 m) and 265 pounds (120 kg). Baseball America rated Pineda as having the best fastball and control in the Mariners' system in 2010, while rating him as having the best fastball and slider in the Mariners season in 2011. Pineda's fastball in 2011 averaged 94.7 miles per hour (152.4 km/h), the highest among MLB rookies with at least 100 innings pitched, ranking fourth in the American League behind Alexi Ogando, Justin Verlander, and David Price. Pineda also threw a changeup. Since his shoulder surgery, his fastball was in the 92–93 mph range, topping out around 96–97.

== Personal life ==
Pineda's family lives in the Dominican Republic. While pitching for the Mariners in 2011, he roomed with Navarro, who had become the Mariners' bullpen coach.

On August 20, 2012, Pineda was charged with driving under the influence (DUI) of alcohol while on injury rehab in Tampa, Florida. On February 20, 2013. Pineda pleaded no contest to driving under the influence. In the aftermath, he was fined $500, received a year of probation, and was ordered to attend DUI school plus undergo 50 hours of community service.

== See also ==
- List of Major League Baseball players suspended for performance-enhancing drugs
