= Los Cacaos =

- Los Cacaos in the Dominican Republic
- Coordinates: 18°31′12″N 70°18′00″W
- Country: Dominican Republic
- Province: San Cristóbal
- Established as a Municipality: February 2, 2004

Area
  - Total: 145.62 km^{2} (56.22 sq mi)

Population (2012)
  - Total: 49,858
  - Density: 342.38/km^{2} (886.77/sq mi)
- Municipal Districts: 0

Los Cacaos is a municipality (municipio) of the San Cristóbal province in the Dominican Republic.

As of the 2012 census the municipality had 49,858 inhabitants. For comparison with other municipalities and municipal districts see the list of municipalities and municipal districts of the Dominican Republic.
