= San Cristóbal, Dominican Republic =

San Cristóbal
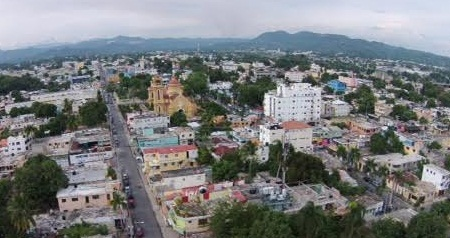
- View of San Cristóbal

- Coat of arms
- Nicknames: Cuna de la Constitución, Provincia Benemérita
- San Cristóbal in the Dominican Republic
- Coordinates: 18°25′00″N 70°06′20″W
- Country: Dominican Republic
- Province: San Cristóbal

Government
  - Mayor of San Cristóbal: Nelson de la Rosa
  - Senator of San Cristobal: Gustavo Lara Salazar
  - Governor of San Cristobal: Pura Casilla

Area
  - Total: 226.52 km^{2} (87.46 sq mi)
- Elevation: 33 m (108 ft)

Population (2022 census)
  - Total: 277,793
  - Density: 1,226.4/km^{2} (3,176.2/sq mi)
  - Demonym: Sancristobalense(s)
- Municipal Districts: 1
- Distance to – Santo Domingo: 26 km (16 mi)
- Website: San Cristóbal website

San Cristóbal is a city in the southern region of Dominican Republic. It is the municipal (municipio) capital of the San Cristóbal province. The municipality is located in a valley at the foothills of the mountains belonging to the Cordillera Central, between the Nigua and Nizao rivers. Within this municipality there is one municipal district (distrito municipal): Hato Damas.

San Cristóbal was founded in the late 16th century. The Constitution of the Dominican Republic was signed in San Cristóbal in 1844. The city is also notable for being the birthplace of Rafael Trujillo, dictator from 1930 to 1961, who was killed by anti-dictatorial Dominicans on his way to San Cristóbal in 1961 as part of a successful plot to end his 30-year authoritarian regime.

== History ==
The first explorations in San Cristóbal date back to the beginning of the conquest and colonization of Hispaniola with the second Voyage of Christopher Columbus in 1493. There were various haciendas, herds and ranches that existed in the Partido de los Ingenios de Nigua (today San Cristóbal) during the Spanish colonial era.

The formation of the town is credited to Miguel Díaz. Fleeing from the punishment that awaited him from the authorities of La Isabela (the first city created by Columbus in America), due to a violent fight he had with another colonist, he moved to this place where he married an indigenous woman by the name of Catalina. According to legend, fearing being abandoned by her spouse, she revealed to him the existence of a place where they found gold deposits; Díaz then returned to La Isabela to inform the colonial authorities of his find.

Upon confirming the existence of gold on the banks of the Haina River, the Spanish proceeded to arrange for the settlement of a group of settlers and the installation of a fort called Buenaventura and later San Cristóbal, in honor of the admiral. Between the banks of the Haina and Nigua rivers, herds, haciendas and ranches were formed, as well as sugar mills that contributed to a notable development of the place. The Partido de los Ingenios de Nigua was the name given to the route between the indicated rivers, it was not until 1782 when it was elevated to the category of parish, constituting the San Gregorio de Nigua Church as the seat of the parish, which is undoubtedly one of the oldest construction of San Cristóbal still standing.

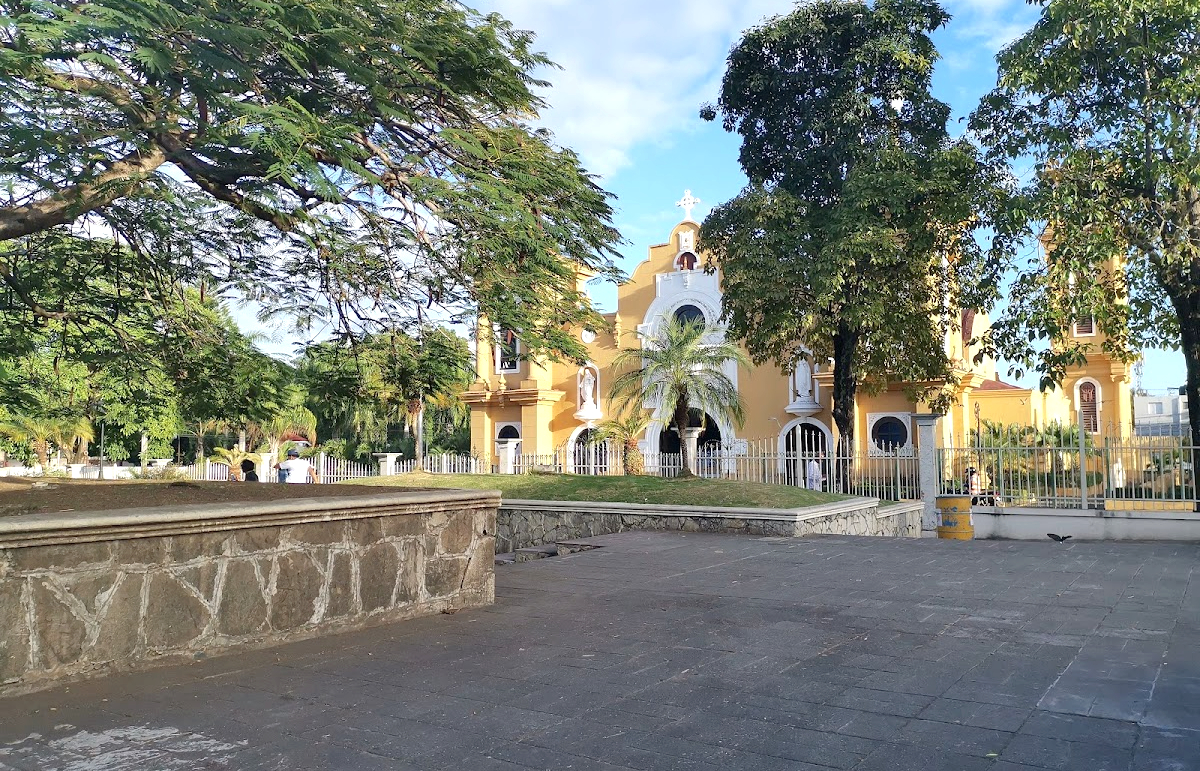

Rafael Trujillo, dictator from 1930 to 1961, was born in San Cristóbal in 1891 and had several properties in San Cristóbal among which were:

- El Castillo El Cerro
- La Casa de Playa de Najayo o Casa de Marfil
- La Hacienda María o Casa Blanca
- La Casa de Caoba (his favorite home)

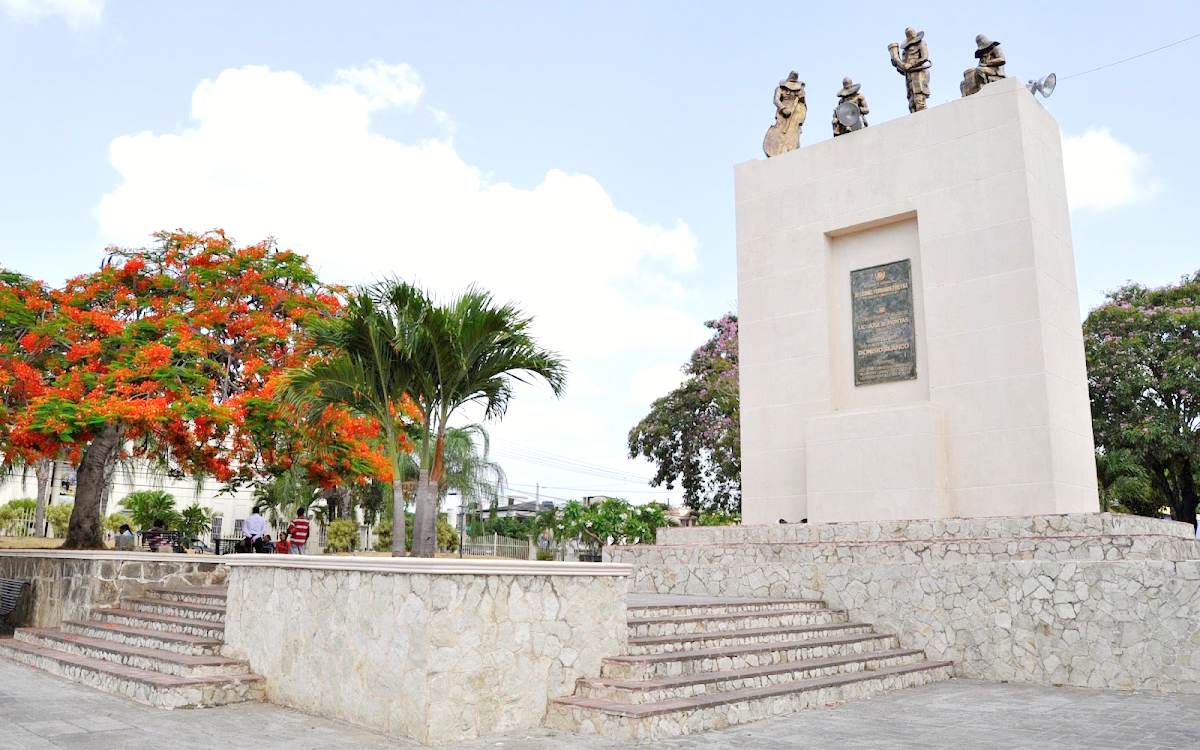

All of these buildings are still standing, though in poor conditions. He built many monuments in his hometown, such as Balneario La Toma, and Parque Piedras Vivas – a park he ordered to be built from rocks and stones collected from each city of the Dominican Republic to honor himself (hence the park's name "Living Stones").

== Geography ==
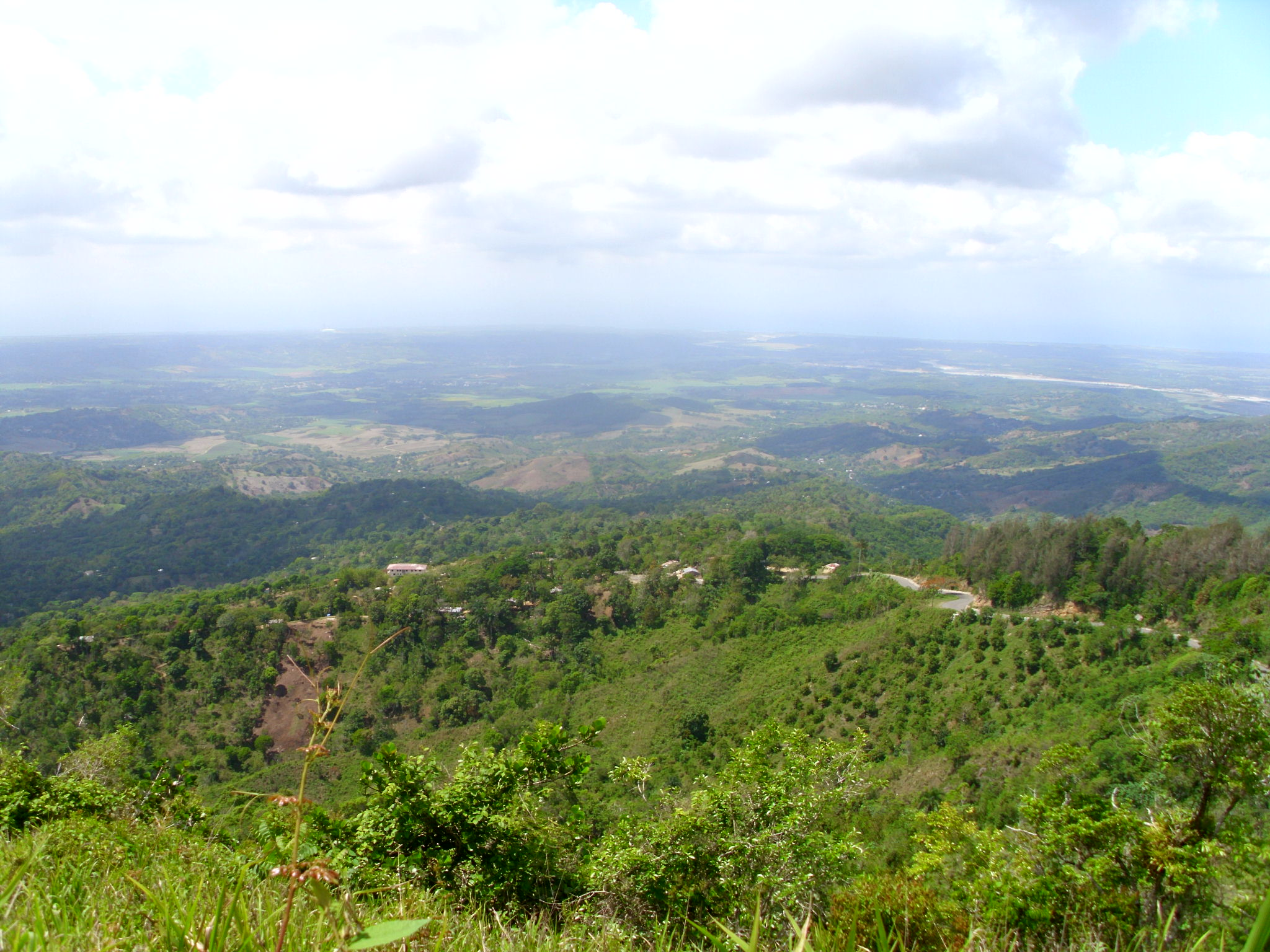
San Cristóbal

San Cristóbal is located about 30 kilometres (19 mi) on the DR-2 from Santo Domingo and close to Bajos de Haina. It is located near the coast of the Caribbean Sea. The topography is hilly as you go farther inland into the Cordillera Central mountain range.

== Climate ==
San Cristóbal has a tropical monsoon climate (Köppen Am), with hot weather year-round and heavy rainfall from May to November, when hurricanes are a major risk.

Climate data for San Cristóbal, Dominican Republic (1961–1990)
Month	Jan	Feb	Mar	Apr	May	Jun	Jul	Aug	Sep	Oct	Nov	Dec	Year
Mean daily maximum °C (°F)	29.6 (85.3)	29.8 (85.6)	30.6 (87.1)	31.3 (88.3)	31.3 (88.3)	31.6 (88.9)	32.2 (90.0)	32.4 (90.3)	32.4 (90.3)	31.9 (89.4)	31.1 (88.0)	29.9 (85.8)	31.2 (88.2)
Daily mean °C (°F)	24.3 (75.7)	24.4 (75.9)	25.0 (77.0)	25.9 (78.6)	26.4 (79.5)	26.9 (80.4)	27.4 (81.3)	27.4 (81.3)	27.2 (81.0)	26.8 (80.2)	25.9 (78.6)	24.8 (76.6)	26.0 (78.8)
Mean daily minimum °C (°F)	19.1 (66.4)	19.0 (66.2)	19.5 (67.1)	20.5 (68.9)	21.4 (70.5)	22.2 (72.0)	22.6 (72.7)	22.4 (72.3)	21.9 (71.4)	21.6 (70.9)	20.8 (69.4)	19.7 (67.5)	20.9 (69.6)
Average rainfall mm (inches)	60.9 (2.40)	51.1 (2.01)	52.9 (2.08)	72.4 (2.85)	218.1 (8.59)	214.8 (8.46)	148.3 (5.84)	202.5 (7.97)	187.5 (7.38)	210.5 (8.29)	111.6 (4.39)	68.8 (2.71)	1,599.4 (62.97)
Average rainy days (≥ 1.0 mm)	6.8	5.9	6.9	7.5	13.7	12.4	11.3	11.9	11.2	12.8	9.1	8.1	117.6
Average relative humidity (%)	76.3	75.1	72.6	71.9	76.9	78.2	76.2	76.7	77.3	79.5	77.5	77.0	76.3
Source: NOAA

== Economy ==
Goya Foods has its Dominican Republic offices in San Cristóbal. The city has considerable sources of work, in which the Nestlé factory (maggi), the Sancela Family group plant, the Goya processing plant as well as the glass industrial park, the armory free zone, the CEDELCA piping factory, the tropical products factory (coco López) as well as the marmotech, Tecnotiles and Star marble marble plants, among other companies. However, due to its proximity to Santo Domingo, the population moves to work in the capital city, as well as in the towns of Bajo de Haina and Nigua. Currently in the city they are installing new businesses in its main streets and avenues.

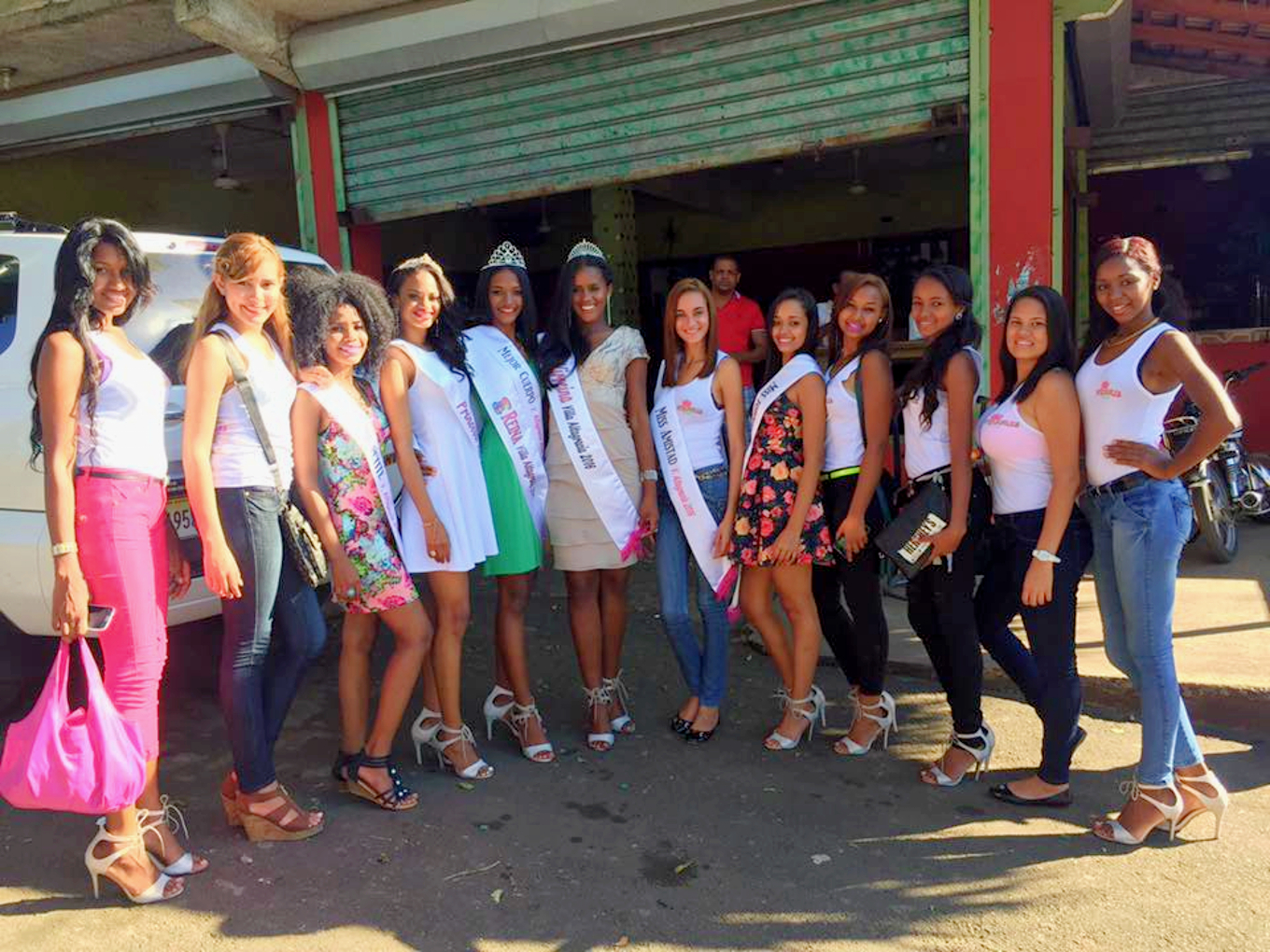
San Cristobal, Dominican Republic pageant

The economic activities are influenced by the fact that it is the main city in the southern region and the fifth in the country and are industry (in San Cristóbal and the free zones of Bajo de Haina, Nigua and Villa Altagracia), small-scale agriculture (except citrus plantations in Villa Altagracia, coffee in the mountains and onions in the Najayo-Palenque plains) and port plantations (in Bajo de Haina and Palenque).

It has an intense tourist activity, especially national or internal tourists. The main centers are the beaches of Najayo, Palenque, El Balnearios de La Toma, Cuevas del Pomier and the Haina and Nizao rivers.

Currently, San Cristóbal is one of the cities with the best rates in the area of telecommunications. It has the services of the main telephone companies in the country, as well as various cable and satellite television companies.

== Education ==
There are a total of 72 educational centers and 92 center boards. The Educational District 04-03 has under its jurisdiction 56 Basic Centers, 10 Middle Schools, 6 Adult Centers, an Initial Education Center "National Council for Children and Adolescents (Conani)" and the Directorate of Attention to the Early Childhood (DAPI).

The large number of high school graduates in this city are concentrated in the Liceo Enedina Puello Renville, located in the Madre Vieja Sur sector. In said center there is a population of more than 1500 students in their morning, afternoon and evening shifts.

San Cristóbal has numerous educational centers at the basic, middle and higher levels, among which the UASD San Cristóbal, also called CURSCEN, the Loyola Polytechnic Institute (recently endorsed and certified as a Loyola Specialized Institute of Higher Studies) stand out. teach technical engineering careers such as: Network and Telecommunications Engineering, Industrial Engineering, Electrical Engineering and Agricultural Engineering, with all the prestige of the Loyola Polytechnic Institute.), Loyola Cooperative School, Francisco José Peynado Polytechnic Institute, Santa Rita School, Center for Ronda Del Saber Studies, Baptist School, San Rafael School, English Learning Center, Canaan Academy, etc. Studies are offered at the pre-initial, basic, secondary and higher levels. A high percentage of the young population moves to Santo Domingo to study, due to the diversity of offers and the proximity.

It also has a technical-professional training center, INFOTEP (National Institute for Technical-Professional Training), its teaching is partially carried out at the Loyola Polytechnic Institute.

== Notable residents ==
=== Military and politics ===
- Antonio Duvergé, Dominican general of French origin who served in the Dominican War of Independence.
- Temístocles Montás, president of the Dominican Liberation Party (PLD)
- Rafael Leonidas Trujillo, Dominican dictator who ruled the Dominican Republic from February 1930 until his assassination in May 1961

=== Music ===
- Jochy Hernandez, Merengue singer

=== Sports ===
- Miguel Andújar, third baseman for the San Diego Padres of Major League Baseball (MLB)
- Santiago Casilla, former MLB relief pitcher
- José Guillén, former MLB outfielder
- Francisco Liriano, former MLB pitcher
- Rigoberto Mendoza (born 1992), professional basketball player
- Raúl Mondesí, former MLB outfielder and former mayor of San Cristobal (2010–16)
- Hector Neris, MLB relief pitcher
- Iván Nova, pitcher for the SSG Landers of the KBO League
- Michael Pineda, MLB pitcher
- Al Reyes, former MLB pitcher
- José Rijo, former MLB pitcher
- Sixto Sánchez, pitcher in the Miami Marlins
- Ervin Santana, former MLB pitcher
- Magneuris Sierra, MLB player
- Pedro Strop, MLB pitcher

== Sites of interest ==
- Diego Caballero Sugar Mill
- La Toma de San Cristóbal
- Pomier Caves
- Parque Piedras Vivas
- Playa Palenque
- Playa Najayo
- Ingenio CAEI
- Fuerte Resoli.

== Sectors ==
- 5 de abril
- Canastica
- El Pomier
- Hatillo
- La Cruz
- La Guandulera
- La Suiza
- La Toma
- Las Flores
- Lava Pies
- Los Cacaitos
- Los Molinas
- Los Montones
- Los Corozos
- Zona verde
- Los Novas
- Madre Vieja Norte
- Madre Vieja Sur
- Medina
- Moscú
- Pueblo Nuevo
- Sabana Toro
- Villa Fundación
- Villa Liberación
- Villa Valdez
- Zona Verde
- Mira Cielo
- Villa Mercedes
- Las Arecas
- Villa Liberación
- Najayo Arriba
- Yaguate
- Cambita
- Doña Ana
- Hatillo
- Nicole
- San Isidro
- Nigua
- Frank Reyna
