= El Carril =

- Location within the Dominican Republic
- Coordinates: 18°27′0″N 70°1′12″W
- Country: Dominican Republic
- Province: San Cristóbal

Population (2008)
  - Total: 2,902

El Carril is a town in the San Cristóbal province of the Dominican Republic.

== Sources ==
- World Gazeteer: Dominican Republic – World-Gazetteer.com
