= Governor of San Cristóbal =

The Governor of San Cristóbal is the civil representative of the President of the Republic in San Cristóbal Province, who designated it.

From its creation until the fall of the Trujillo dictatorship the title of the Governor was Governor of Trujillo Province. During a period of time, the Governor was elevated to the category of Secretary of State (Minister) and was titled as Secretary of State, Governor of Trujillo Province.

The Article 198 of the Constitution of the 2010 said the requirements to be governor:

1. Be Dominican.
2. Be older than 25 years.
3. Have full use of civil and political rights.

The governor's attribution and duties are determined by law.

The current governor is Pura Castilla.

== List of San Cristóbal governors ==
The follow list is incomplete.

Governor	From	To	President
Mr. Abigail A. Pereyra	1938	30 Octubre 1941	
Mr. Enrique Montes de Oca	30 Octubre 1941		Manuel de Js. Troncoso
Mr. Romeo Rojas	27 July 1942	13 June 1943	Rafael Trujillo
Dr. Federico Augusto Paulino	13 June 1943		Rafael Trujillo
Mr. Virgilio Álvarez Sánchez	4 May 1945	28 December 1945	Rafael Trujillo
Mr. Mario Abreu Penzo	28 December 1945		Rafael Trujillo
Dr. José Benjamín Uribe Macías (first term)	20 January 1948		Rafael Trujillo
Mr. Andrés Julio Espinal	1 February 1949	1 July 1949	Rafael Trujillo
Dr. José Benjamín Uribe Macías (second term)	1 July 1949		Rafael Trujillo
Mr. Pedro Pablo Villanueva	29 April 1951	28 February 1952	Héctor B. Trujillo
Mr. Enrique Arzeno Lora	28 February 1952	9 December 1952	Rafael Trujillo
Mr. Julio Ibarra Fas	9 December 1952	25 March 1953	Héctor B. Trujillo
Dr. Rafael Tulio Pérez Martínez	25 March 1953		Héctor B. Trujillo
Mr. José A. Rivera González		20 February 1955	Héctor B. Trujillo
Mr. Felipe S. Parra Pagán (first term)	20 February 1955	10 September 1956	Héctor B. Trujillo
Mr. Joaquín Antonio Balaguer Ortíz	10 September 1956	1 December 1956	Héctor B. Trujillo
Mr. Pedro Casals Pastoriza	1 December 1956	16 December 1957	Héctor B. Trujillo
Dr. Josefina Pimentel Boves	16 December 1957	9 August 1961	Héctor B. Trujillo
Dr. Rafael Tulio Pérez Martínez	9 August 1961	23 January 1962	Joaquín Balaguer
Mr. Pedro N. Uribe Albert	23 January 1962	7 May 1962	Rafael F. Bonelly
Mr. Sócrates Barinas Coiscou	7 May 1962		Rafael F. Bonelly
Mr. Felipe Parra Pagán (second term)	3 October 1963	16 May 1964	Triumvirate
Mr. Pablo Barinas Coiscou	16 May 1964		Triumvirate
Dr. Máximo Puello Renvill	21 September 1965		Héctor García-Godoy
Miss Mercedes Leger		22 July 1971	Joaquín Balaguer
Prof. Pastora Nivar de Pérez	22 July 1971	26 March 1974	Joaquín Balaguer
Mr. Miguel Angel García F.	26 March 1974	16 May 1977	Joaquín Balaguer
Mr. Raymundo Roig	16 May 1977		Joaquín Balaguer
Mr. Julio Urbáez	16 August 1978	15 January 1982	Antonio Guzman Fernandez
Mr. Fausto Bienvenido Penn	15 January 1982		Antonio Guzman Fernández
Mr. Vinicio Jiménez	16 August 1982	9 June 1983	Salvador Jorge Blanco
Mr. Anibal Santana Álvarez	9 June 1983		Salvador Jorge Blanco
Dr. María Antonieta Bello	16 August 1986	4 May 1990	Joaquín Balaguer
Mr. Leonidas A. Bernard Barinas	4 May 1990	1 April 1994	Joaquín Balaguer
Mr. Julio César Domínguez	1 April 1994	22 August 1994	Joaquín Balaguer
Mr. Víctor Manuel Penn Álvarez	22 August 1994	30 March 1995	Joaquín Balaguer
Dr. Luis Antonio Roa Pujols	30 March 1995	10 September 1995	Joaquín Balaguer
Mr. Salvador E. Cabrera Benzán	10 September 1995	16 August 1996	Joaquín Balaguer
Dr. Nelly Pérez Duvergé	28 August 1996	17 August 1998	Leonel Fernández
Mr. Raul Javier Félix	17 August 1998	16 August 2000	Leonel Fernández
Dr. Miriam de la Rosa	16 August 2000	17 April 2002	Hipólito Mejía
Mr. Angel Rafael Salazar	17 April 2002	23 April 2003	Hipólito Mejía
Dr. Miriam de la Rosa	23 April 2003	16 August 2004	Hipólito Mejía
Dr. Manuel Orlando Espinosa Medina	16 August 2004	16 August 2010	Leonel Fernández
Mr. Alfonso Gamalier Montás	19 August 2010	30 August 2012	Leonel Fernández
Mr. Julio César Díaz	30 August 2012		Danilo Medina
Ms. Pura Castilla	30 August 2020	Incumbent	Luis Abinader
