= Yaguate =

San Gregorio de Yaguate
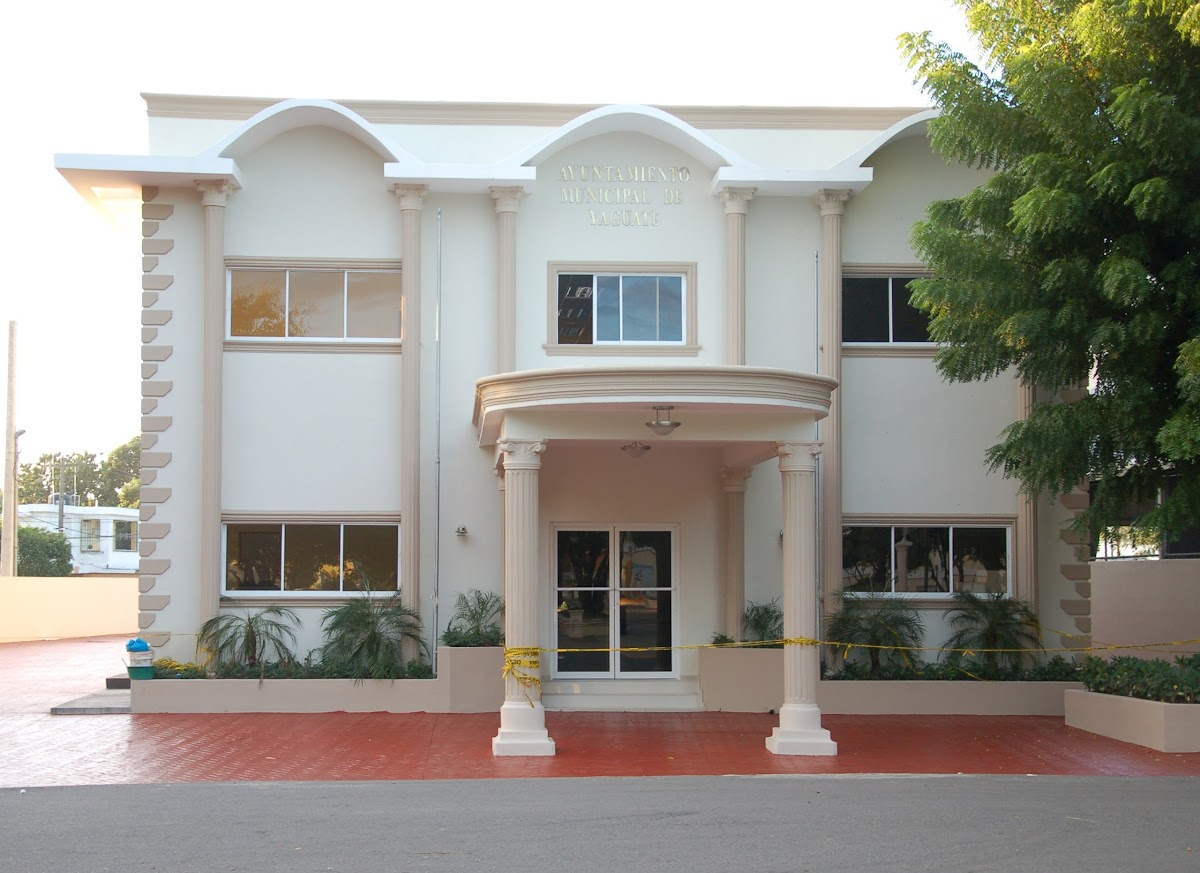
- Yaguate town hall

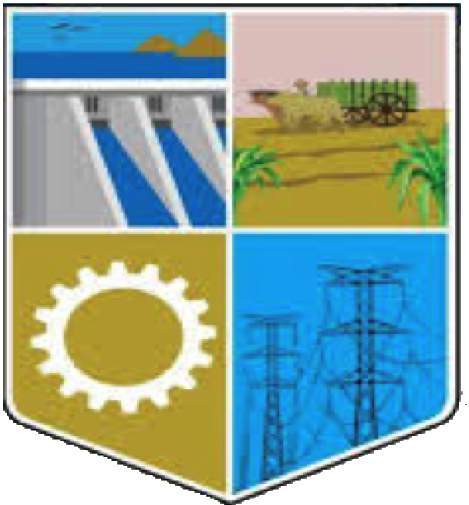
- Coat of arms

- Yaguate in the Dominican Republic
- Coordinates: 18°19′48″N 70°10′48″W
- Country: Dominican Republic
- Province: San Cristóbal

Area
  - Total: 121.81 km^{2} (47.03 sq mi)

Population (2012)
  - Total: 92,586
  - Density: 760.09/km^{2} (1,968.6/sq mi)
- Municipal Districts: 0

Yaguate is a town and municipality (municipio) of the San Cristóbal province in the south region of Dominican Republic. Yaguate is located about 48 km (30 miles) from the city of San Cristóbal near the DR-2 that goes to Baní.

== History ==
On the western banks of the Nizao River at the end of the 16th century, the Spanish captain Juan Tello de Guzmán established the Yaguate settlement. The early settlers were dedicated to raising cattle and were not dedicated to the cultivation of agricultural products with an agro-industrial vocation, as were the mills in which a slave structure allowed the growth of a different society.

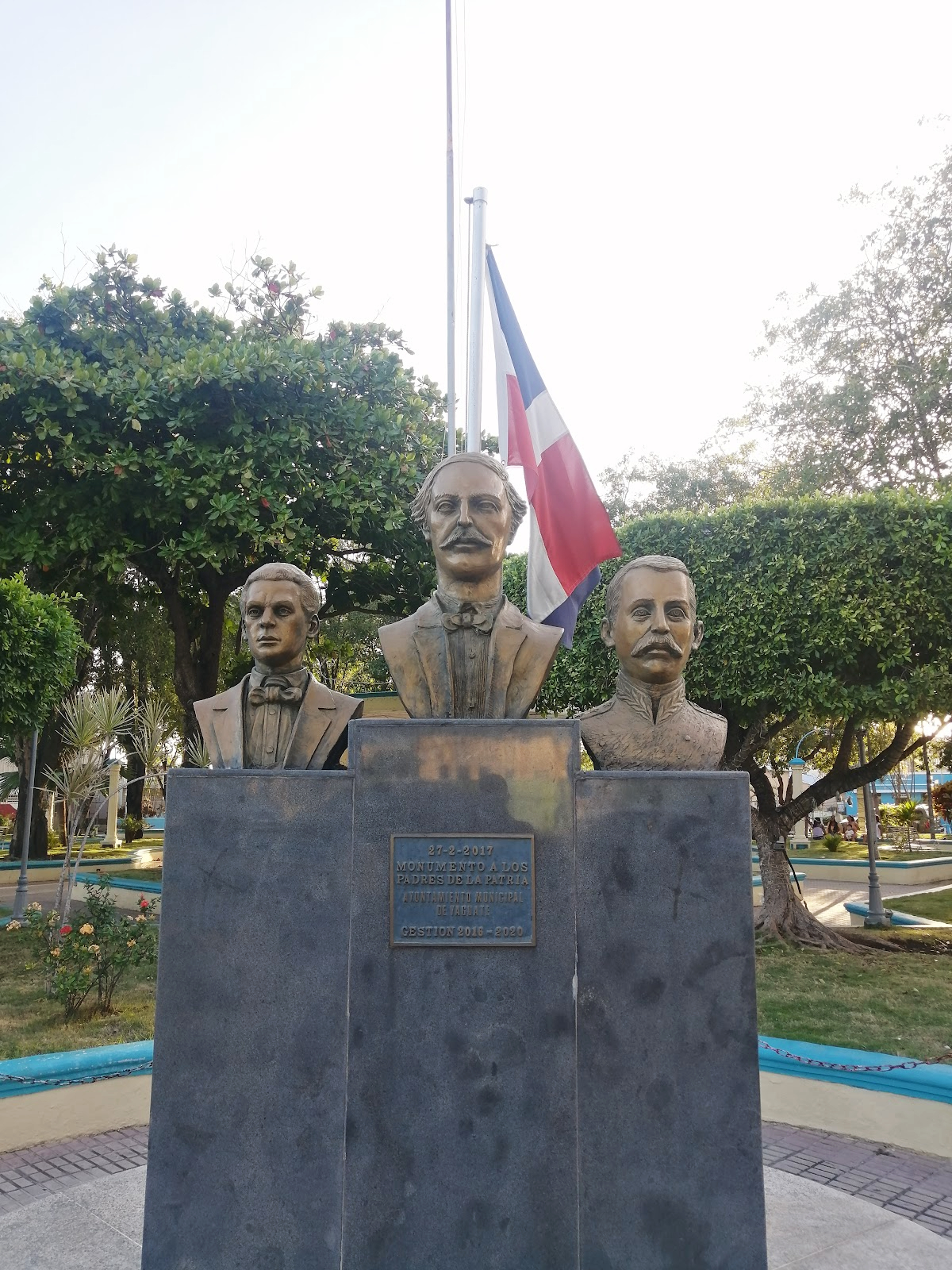
Trinitarios statue in Yaguate, Dominican Republic.

The rancher settlements were places where families lived whose main occupation consisted of raising horses and cutting wood. While the mill required a large amount of labor for its proper functioning, in the ranch the massive use of the slave was not necessary, which is why homogeneous human settlements arose in their surroundings where the Spanish were a majority.

== Economy ==
The town square has a basketball court and several churches. There is also the Ayuntamiento, the town hall. There is a small secondary school, a clinic, and a few grocery stores, along with several bars. The region is filled with sugar cane fields, and nearby the town is a sugar refinery called "Ingenio Caei."

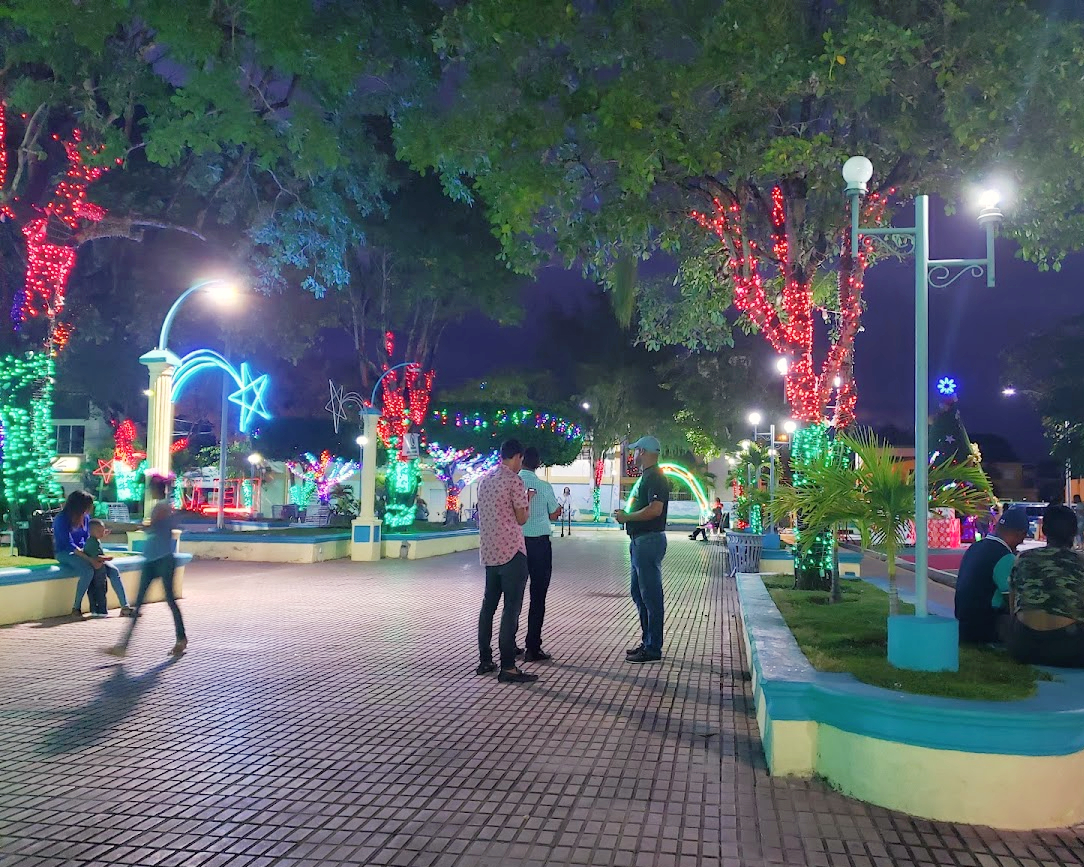
Yaguate, Dominican Republic during Christmas time.

The road heading north from the town leads through several small neighborhoods to the Nizao river. There are many sand mines in the area, as well as some fantastic swimming spots as the river is very clear. Further up the road is the Valdesia Dam.

In 2003, a flood occurred that covered roughly half of the town. Missionaries from the Church of Jesus Christ of Latter Day Saints helped to rescue many people from the flood, although one person died, trapped behind a locked door.

== Well-known people ==
- Michael Pineda, (b 1989) is a professional baseball pitcher for the Detroit Tigers
- Jeurys Familia, (b 1989) is a professional baseball pitcher for the Philadelphia Phillies
- Jose Ramirez, (b 1990) is a professional baseball pitcher for the Atlanta Braves
- Arodys Vizcaíno, (b 1990) is a professional baseball pitcher for the Kansas City Royals
