= Jochy Hernández =

Dominican singer (1963-1994)

Carlos José "Jochy" Hernández Diaz (12 September 1963 – 30 April 1994) was a Dominican Merengue singer who obtained success during the 1980s, becoming well known in Latin America.

== Early life ==
Hernández was the son of Bartolo Hernández.

Hernández lost his father at the age of 11 when, on 5 October 1974, Bartolo was shot on his chest and murdered. His father's murder was never solved.

As a teenager, Hernández launched his singing career, becoming a Merengue singer with a few bands, before landing a spot on a popular Merengue orchestra that was led by Alex Bueno and by Anibal Bravo, two well-known Dominican musicians of the era.

== Career ==
In 1985, Hernández became a solo singer, signed by Discos CBS, the musical subsidiary of American broadcasting company CBS. His first release was named "Ahora Yo" ("Now Its My Turn").

=== Vehicular accident ===
On 16 August 1987, Hernández and his orchestra had played a concert at Cibao when a mini-bus carrying part of the group collided with a truck after the concert had finished. Hernández and his brother Ruddy were in another vehicle; they got off and found three dead musicians; another one, singer Delvi, survived the crash but was hit by an on-coming vehicle and died later. The tragedy took place at a city named Bonao.

In 1988, Hernández released the album that would give him his nickname, "El Amiguito" ("The Little Friend"). The album included a song named "Hermanos Mios" ("My Brothers"), which was dedicated to the musicians who died during the 1987 vehicular tragedy. Ever since, he was known as "El Amiguito del Merengue" ("Merengue's Little Friend").

== Health problems and death ==
In 1989, Hernández started suffering headaches. Tests revealed he had a terminal brain tumor. He was initially given only two months to live, but he persevered, surviving five extra years.

According to his brother, San Cristobal senator Tito Hernández, Tito Hernández made Dominican President Joaquin Balaguer aware of his brother's condition. Balaguer wanted to assist and recommended doctor Ney Arias Lora. Hernández was then sent to a hospital in Boston, Massachusetts by Dr. Arias Lora, and he had surgery there.

Hernández died at the Centro Médico UCE in Santo Domingo, on 30 April 1994, at the age of 30.

== Personal life ==
Hernández married television news reporter and actress María del Carmen Hernández; the couple had three children. One of his children, José Carlos, a rock musician, was murdered in Santo Domingo during 2012. He also has a daughter, Cindy Marie Hernández.

== See also ==
- List of people from the Dominican Republic
- Aneudy Diaz - another Merengue musician who died of a brain tumor
