= San Cristóbal Province =

Province of the Dominican Republic

San Cristóbal
- Province
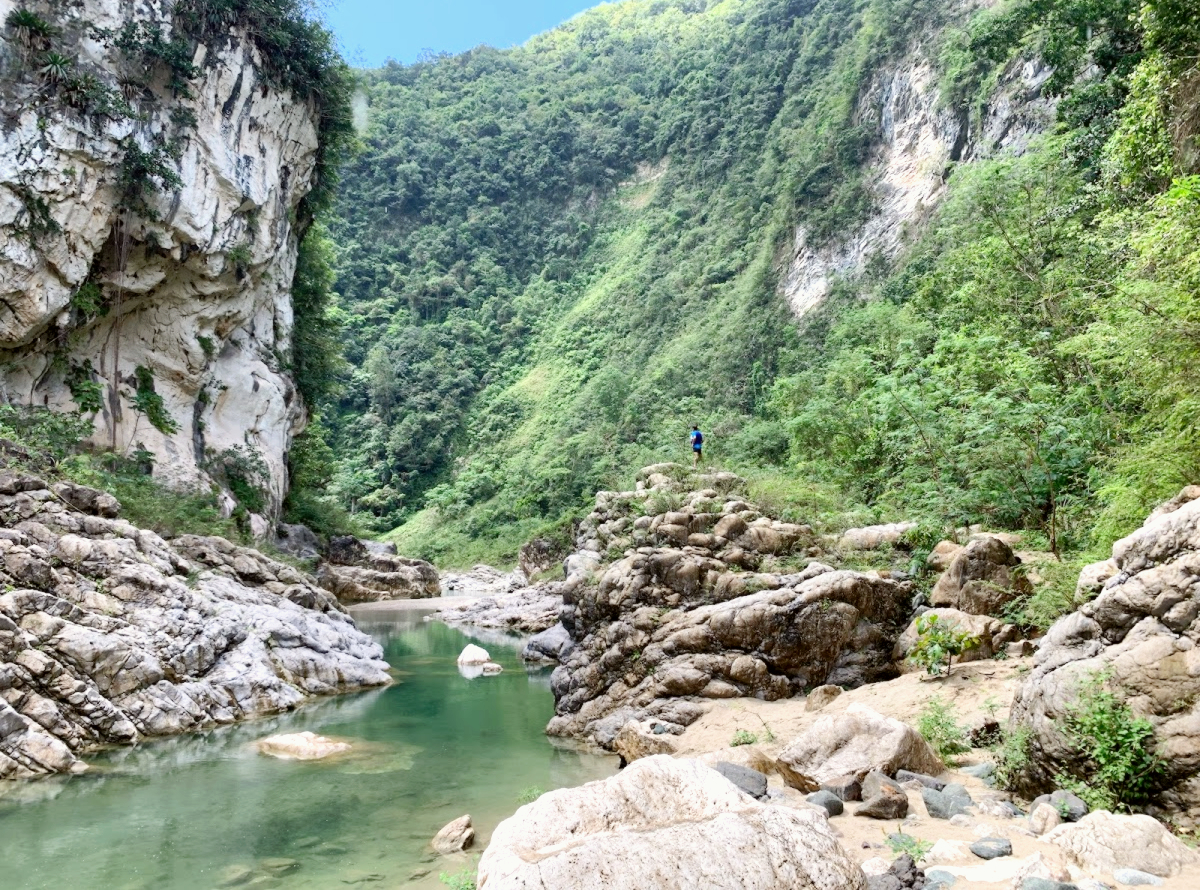
- San Cristobal Dominican Republic landscape near the Cordillera Central region

- Location of the San Cristóbal Province
- Coordinates: 18°31′50″N 70°12′30″W
- Country: Dominican Republic
- Province since: 1932
- Capital: San Cristóbal

Government
  - Type: Subdivisions
  - Body: 8 municipalities 6 municipal districts
  - Congresspersons: 1 Senator; 11 Deputies

Area
  - Total: 1,265.77 km^{2} (488.72 sq mi)

Population (2014)
  - Total: 640,066
  - Density: 505.673/km^{2} (1,309.69/sq mi)
- Time zone: UTC-4 (AST)
- Area code: 1-809 1-829 1-849
- ISO 3166-2: DO-21
- Postal Code: 91000

San Cristóbal (Spanish pronunciation: [ˈsaŋ kɾisˈtoβal]) is a province in the southern region of Dominican Republic, located west of the capital Santo Domingo. With approximately 690,000 inhabitants (2022), it is the fourth most populated province in the country, only behind Santo Domingo, Santiago and the National District. It borders the provinces Monseñor Nouel (north), Monte Plata (northeast), Santo Domingo (east), Peravia (west) and San José de Ocoa (northwest). The Caribbean Sea borders the province to the south. The provincial capital is the city of San Cristóbal.

It was originally named Trujillo after the dictator Rafael Leónidas Trujillo, taking its present name after his assassination in 1961. It included what is now Monte Plata Province until 1992. The provincial capital is San Cristóbal.

== Geography ==
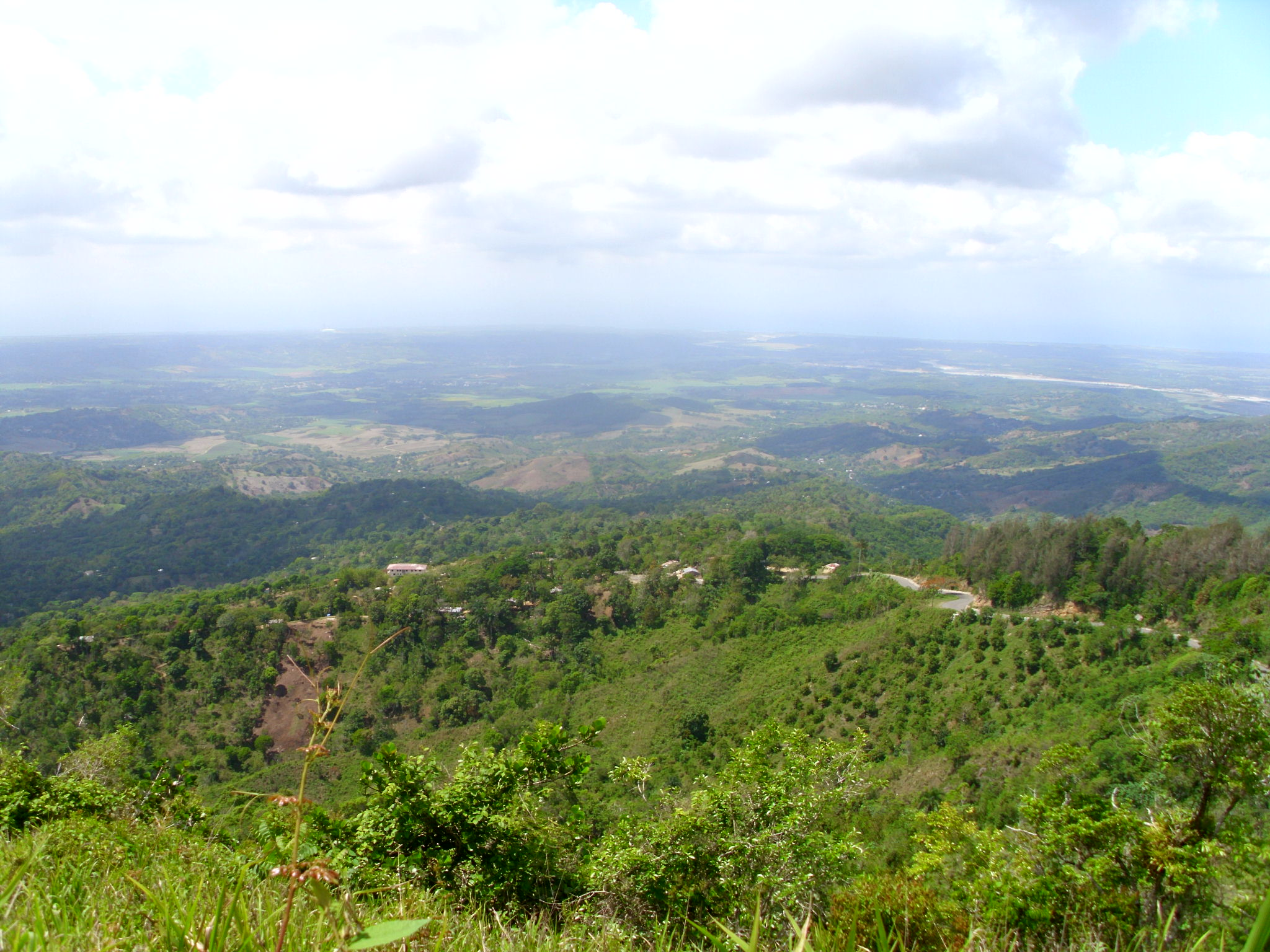
Fuerte Resoli in San Cristobal, Dominican Republic

San Cristóbal is located in a valley surrounded by hills. Its climate is tropical with frequent rains, temperatures can fluctuate often. Foothills of the Cordillera Central are occupying a large part of the province, especially in the northwest. In addition there are other small elevations to the East and South (for example, the Lomas de Duveaux, south of Yaguate). The main rivers in the province are the Haina River, which constitutes the eastern limit of the province; the Nizao, which forms the border with the Peravia province, and the Nigua. Other rivers are Mana, Yubaso (or Blanco), La Toma and the Itabo, Sainaguá and Najayo streams.

== Economy ==
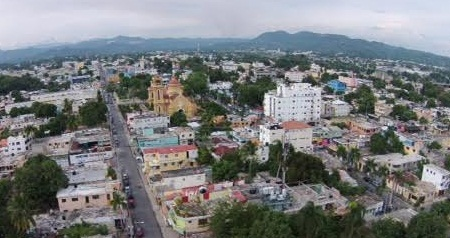
City of San Cristobal

The downtown capital area is the main financial, commercial and industrial center of the province, as well as the main educational and political centers (Government, City Hall). Economic activities are influenced by the fact that it is the main city closest to Santo Domingo. The industry (in San Cristóbal and the free zones of Bajos de Haina, Nigua and Villa Altagracia), small-scale agriculture (except citrus plantations in Villa Altagracia, coffee in the mountains and onions in the plains of Najayo-Palenque) and ports (in Bajos de Haina and Palenque). It has good tourist activity, especially from national tourists who visit from Santo Domingo. The main centers are the beaches of Najayo, Palenque, El Balnearios de La Toma and the rivers Haina and Nizao.

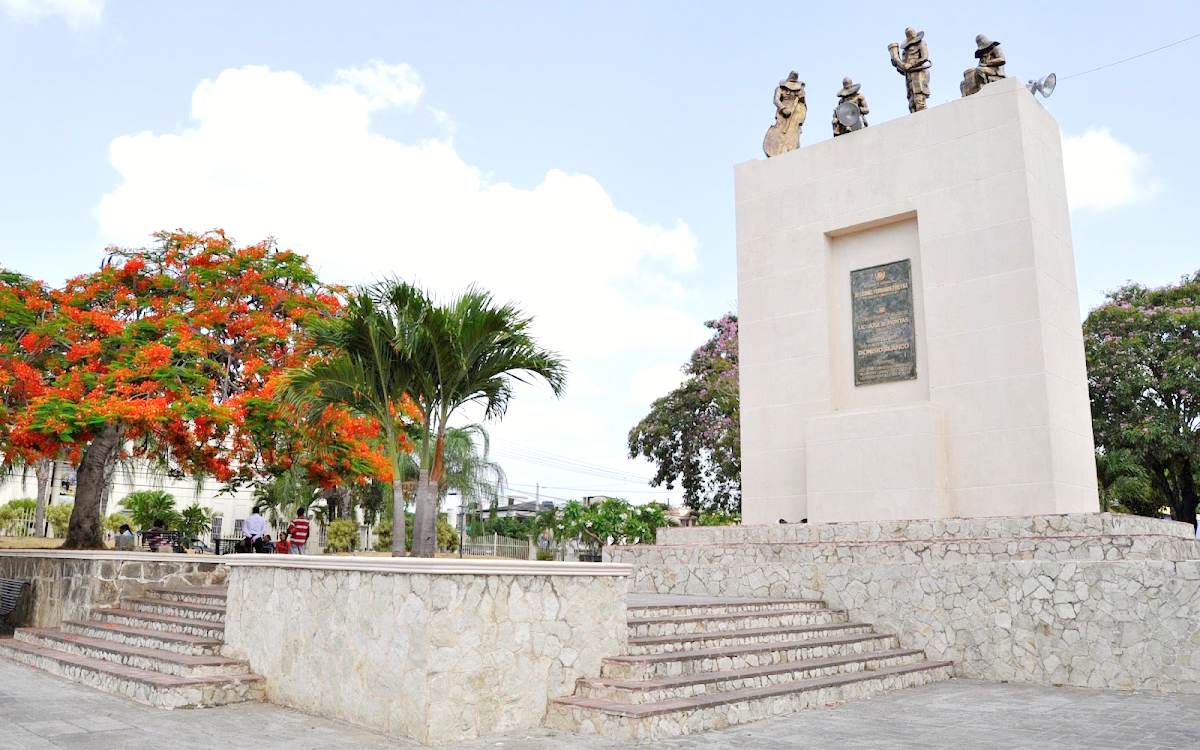
San Cristobal, Dominican Republic park

The province has considerable sources of jobs, in which the Nestlé factory the Sancela family group plant, the Goya processing plant as well as the glass industrial park, the free zones of Itabo, Nigua and the armory, the CEDELCA washbasin, the Dominican Quala factory, the Domicen cement and colon cement plants, the tropic products (coco López) manufactures as well as the marmotech, Tecnotiles and Star marble plants, among others Business. However, due to its proximity to Santo Domingo, the population moves to work in the capital city, as well as the populations of Bajos de Haina and nigua.

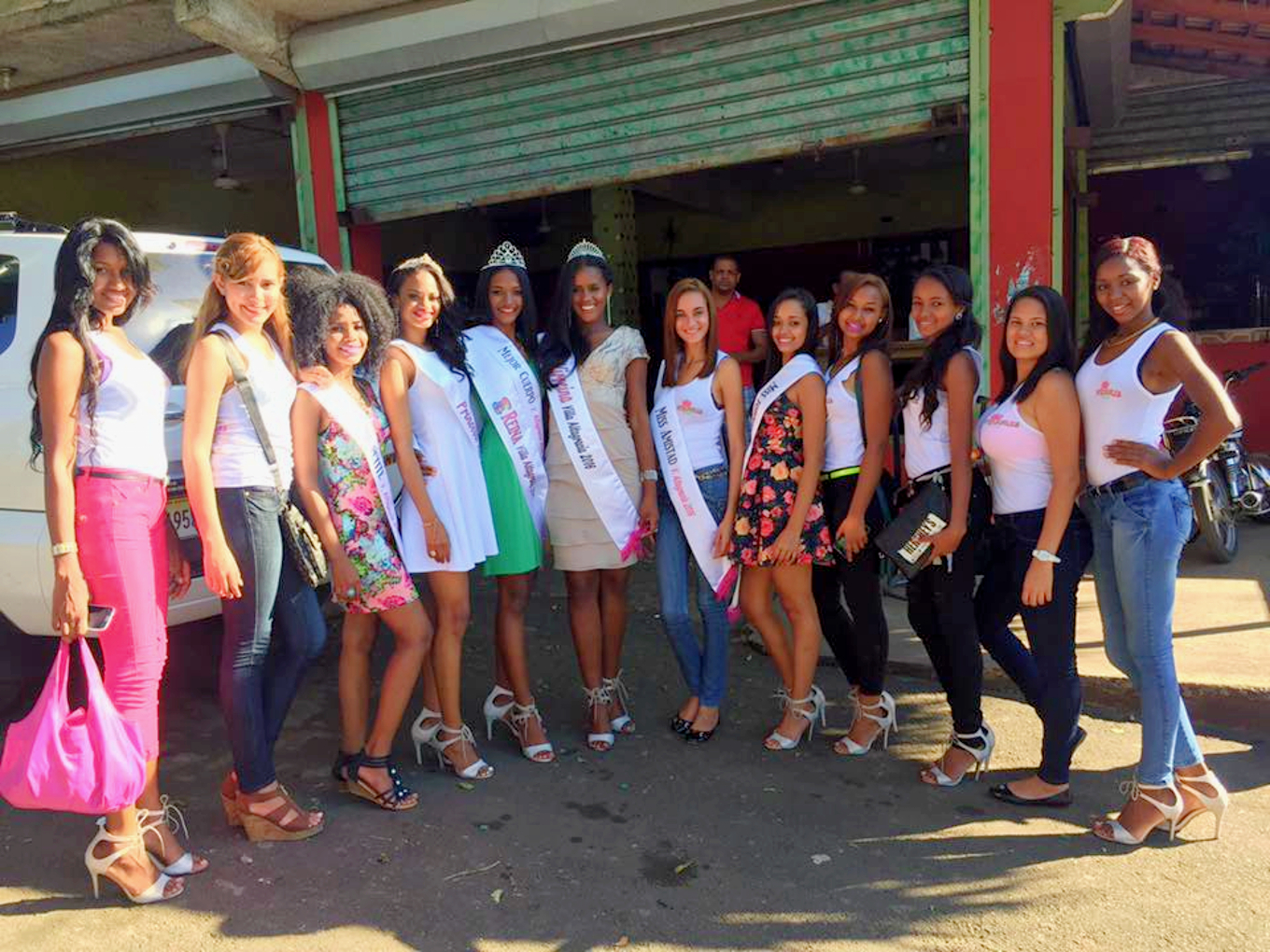
San Cristobal, Dominican Republic province pageant

Currently, San Cristóbal is one of the cities with the best rates in the area of telecommunications. It has the services of the main telephone companies in the country, as well as various cable and satellite television companies.

== Municipalities and municipal districts ==
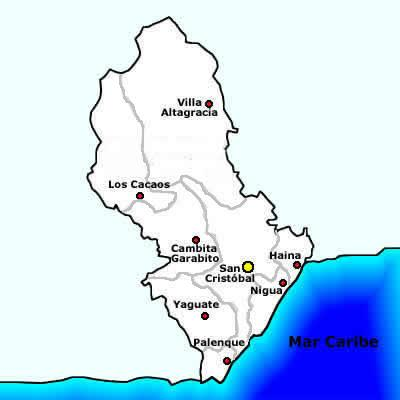
Municipalities of San Cristóbal Province

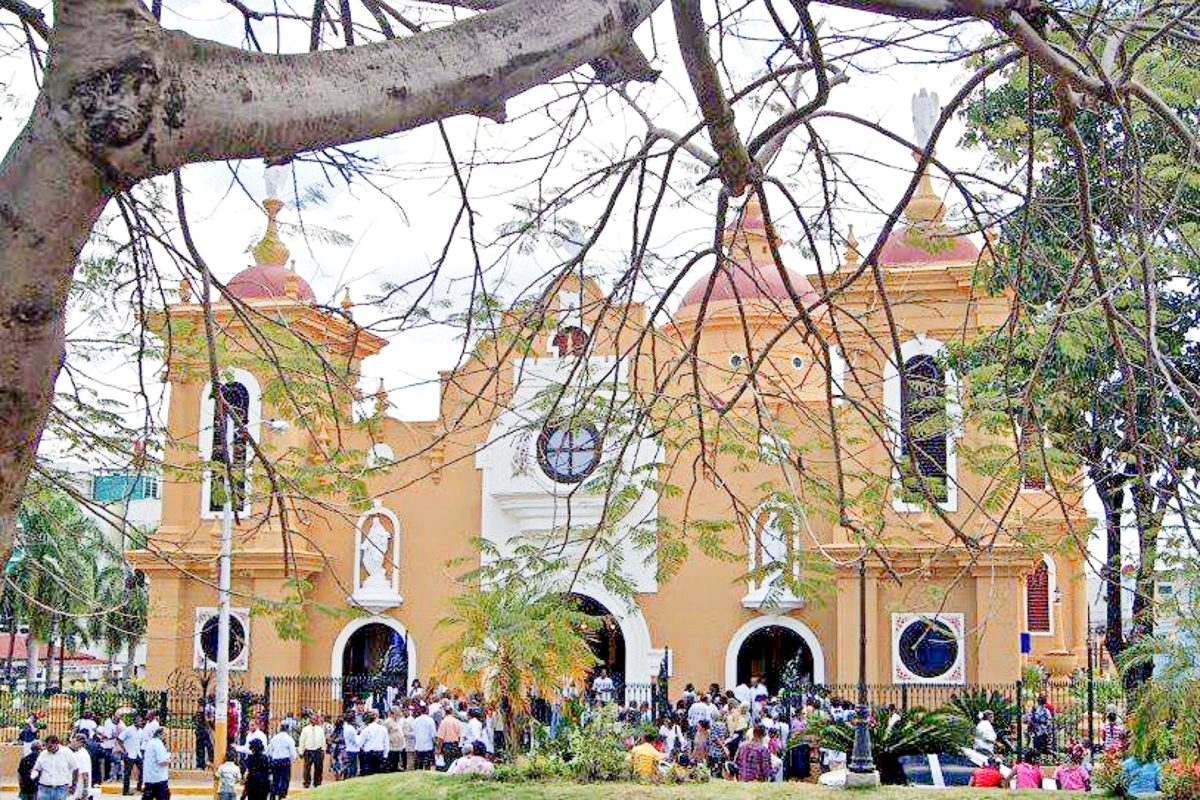
San Cristobal Dominican Republic church

The province as of June 20, 2006 is divided into the following municipalities (municipios) and municipal districts (distrito municipal - D.M.) within them:

- Bajos de Haina
  - El Carril (D.M.)
- San Cristóbal
- Cambita Garabitos
  - Cambita El Pueblecito (D.M.)
- Los Cacaos
- Sabana Grande de Palenque
  - Hato Damas (D.M.)
- San Gregorio de Nigua
- Yaguate
- Villa Altagracia
  - La Cuchilla (D.M.)
  - Medina (D.M.)
  - San José del Puerto (D.M.)

The following is a sortable table of the municipalities and municipal districts with population figures as of the 2012 census. Urban population are those living in the seats (cabeceras literally heads) of municipalities or of municipal districts. Rural population are those living in the districts (Secciones literally sections) and neighborhoods (Parajes literally places) outside of them.

Name	Total population	Urban population	Rural population
Bajos de Haina	158,985	79,856	79,129
Cambita Garabitos	42,589	18,659	23,930
Los Cacaos	49,858	9,652	40,206
Sabana Grande de Palenque	30,247	12,589	17,658
San Cristóbal	275,232	178,574	96,658
San Gregorio de Nigua	40,589	20,154	20,435
San Gregorio de Yaguate	92,586	26,058	46,528
Villa Altagracia	169,655	28,623	91,032
San Cristóbal province	640,066	364,165	215,576

For comparison with the municipalities and municipal districts of other provinces see the list of municipalities and municipal districts of the Dominican Republic.

== See also ==
- Governor of San Cristóbal
