= Beltré =

Beltre is a surname. Notable people with the surname include:

- Adrián Beltré (born 1979), Dominican baseball third-baseman
- Esteban Beltré (born 1967), Dominican baseball shortstop
- Frank Beltre (born 1990), American football player
- Manuel Beltre (born 2004), Dominican baseball player
