= Ramón Santana =

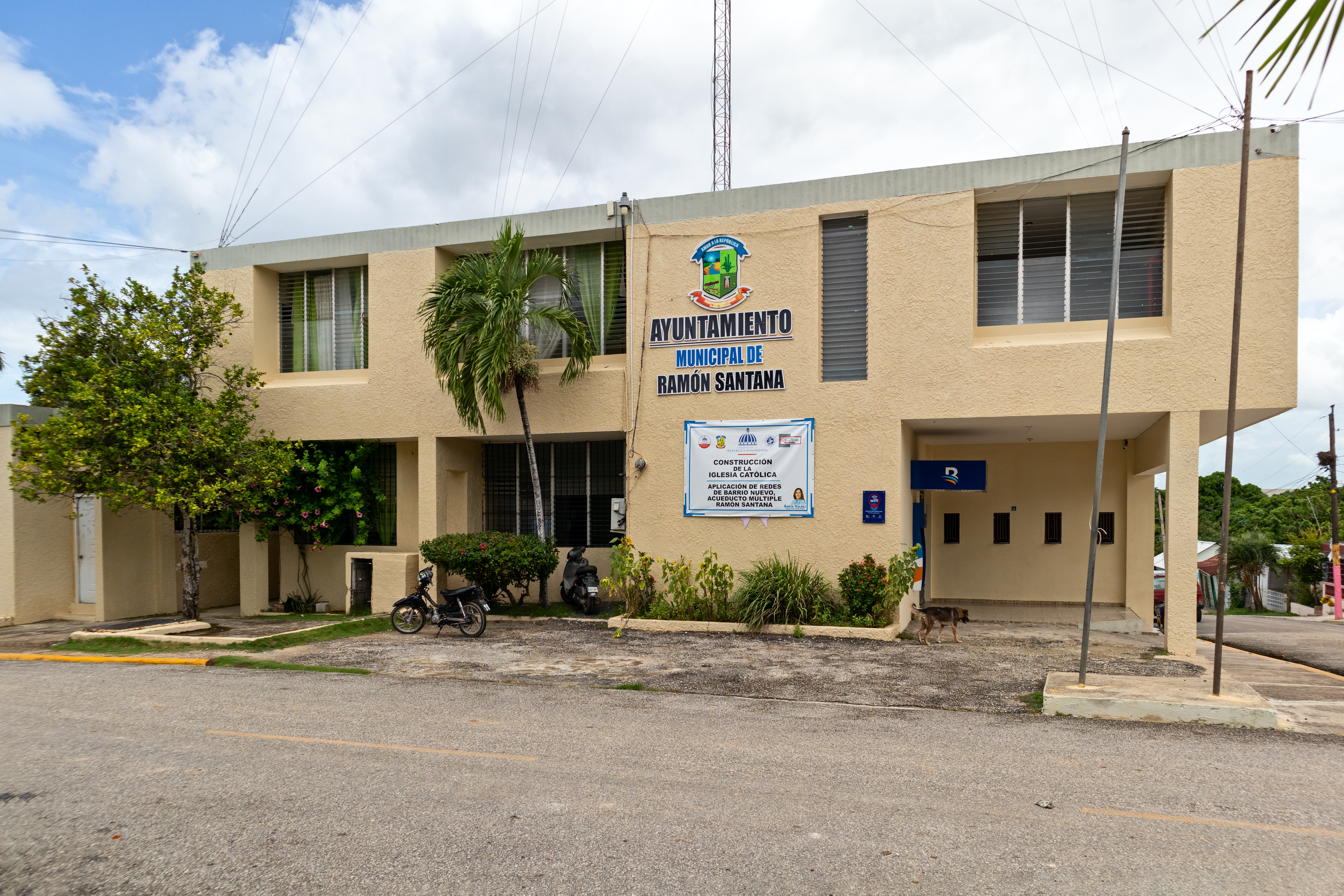

- Location within the Dominican Republic
- Coordinates: 18°33′0″N 69°10′48″W
- Country: Dominican Republic
- Province: San Pedro de Macorís
- Municipality since: 1980

Area
  - Total: 249.92 km^{2} (96.49 sq mi)

Population (2012)
  - Total: 16,548
  - Density: 66.213/km^{2} (171.49/sq mi)

Ramon Santana is a municipality (municipio) of the San Pedro de Macorís province in the Dominican Republic.

Its original name was Guasa (also spelt Guaza) but, in 1899, was changed to Ramón Santana after the twin brother of Pedro Santana.

== Geography ==
The town is on the right side of the Soco River. The Guasa river, a tributary of the Soco, is close to the town.

== History ==
In 1888, it was made a Puesto Cantonal (a "military post"), similar to the present Municipal district, of the El Seibo province.

In 1938, Ramón Santana was transferred to the San Pedro de Macorís province as a municipality.
