= Norberto James Rawlings =

Dominican writer (1945–2021)

- Born: Norberto Pedro James Rawlings; 1945, February 6 San Pedro de Macorís, Dominican Republic.
- Died: January 7, 2021 (75) [[Wellesley], Massachusetts, United States
- Education: University of La Habana, Cuba, Licenciatura en Letras Hispánicas Boston University, Doctoral degree in Hispanic Language and Literatures, 1992
- Occupation: Poet Spanish Teacher
- Notable work: "Los inmigrantes" in Sobre la marcha. ("The immigrants" in On the March) La urdimbre del silencio (On the Threshold of Silence) Patria portátil (Portable Homeland)
- Spouse: Elizabeth C. Wellington (1986-2021)
- Website: https://www.vanderbiltuniversitypress.com/9780826500526/unfinished-country/

Norberto James Rawlings (1945 – 2021) was a poet of Afro-Caribbean descent from the Dominican Republic’s 60s Generation. In his early days, his poetry dealt with intimacy of everyday life in his country’s multicultural society.

== Early years ==
Norberto James Rawlings was born on the sugar plantation of Ingenio Consuelo, San Pedro de Macorís, and grew up in an English-speaking minority community descended from African slaves, known pejoratively as cocolos by the Spanish-speaking Dominicans. His early years were marked by daily struggles as well as exposure to American culture in an impoverished cocolo village of sugar cane workers. In the 1960s, Norberto James moved to Santo Domingo to complete high school at the Liceo Unión Panamericana where he excelled in track and field and won the national 400-meter track race. Because his parents were foreigners, he was prohibited from participating in politics. Despite this rule, he became very active in the revolutionary groups in his school and nearby. Finally, at age 19, he was expelled from school for his political activities. Soon after, James' education came to an abrupt halt when civil war broke out in the Dominican Republic. His mother, Dolores Rawlings left the country (coming to New York) and he joined the rebel forces of the Command located in the Argentine school. His growing political militancy sent him into political exile under the guise of foreign study at the University of Havana, Cuba where he earned his Licenciatura in Language and Literature.

In 1979, James returned to a changed political climate in the Dominican Republic, where he was awarded a powerful position on the National Energy Policy Commission. James decided to settle down and start a family; he married Luz Altagracia Rodríguez and in a short time had two daughters, Malva Mariana and Ruth Esther. However, in spite of the success of his return to his homeland, he disliked the corruption that surrounded him and he decided to pursue graduate studies abroad.

== Later years ==
In 1983, he came to the United States to complete a doctorate in Hispanic Language and Literatures at Boston University, where he met his second wife, Elizabeth Wellington. Together they formed a literary team of poet and translator, and upon receiving their doctoral degrees, they filled academic teaching positions in the Boston area. Meanwhile, Norberto continued to write and publish books of poetry. In 1992, they had a son, Tito Wellington James, and Norberto became an American citizen in a moving ceremony in Boston, Massachusetts. Dr. Norberto James ended his teaching career as a beloved Spanish teacher at the Boston Latin School, where his students affectionately called him "Dr. J." His generosity of spirit helped prepare and direct students with limited resources to prestigious universities such as Harvard. He also continued to give poetry readings and received numerous awards and honors both in the United States and in the Dominican Republic. His last poem was written only six months before his death; his "short poems" became the capstone of his complete works, Poesía Completa, Norberto James Rawlings (2020), which he lived to see published. Norberto Pedro James Rawlings died peacefully in his sleep in 2021 after a 15-year battle with Parkinson's disease.

== Children ==
Malva Mariana James Mangan (December 1980) and Ruth Esther James Rodriguez (November 1981) from his first marriage. Tito Wellington James (December 1992) from his second marriage.

== 1980 to 2021 ==
In 1983, Norberto James Rawlings came to Boston, Massachusetts to complete graduate studies at Boston University where he received his doctoral degree in 1992. Following his graduation he taught Spanish language and literature at institutions in the Boston area including the Boston Latin School until his retirement at age 65. He continued to write and publish books of poetry.

== Books of poetry ==
His first book of poetry from 1969, Sobre la marcha ("On the March"), contains one of the most iconic Dominican poems of the twentieth century, “The Immigrants.” The books of poetry to follow in later years, beginning with La Urdimbre de Silencio, ("At the Threshold of Silence)" offer a wide-ranging reflection on the world beyond the island of his birth, voiced with the poignant longing of an expatriate.

== Works ==
- Sobre la marcha. Santo Domingo, Dominican Republic: Ediciones Futuro, 1969.
- La provincia sublevada. Santo Domingo, Dominican Republic: Editora Taller, 1972.
- Vivir. Santo Domingo, Dominican Republic: Editora Amigo del Hogar, 1981.
- Hago constar. Santo Domingo, Dominican Republic: Editora Taller, 1983.
- Obras 1969-2000. Santo Domingo, Dominican Republic: Consejo Presidencial de Cultura, 2000.
- Poesía 1969-2000. Prologue by Néstor E. Rodríguez. Santo Domingo, Dominican Republic: Ediciones Cielonaranja, 2011.
- Poesía completa, 2020. Santo Domingo, Dominican Republic: Ediciones Cielonaranja, 2020
- Unfinished Country: The Revolutionary Poetics of Norberto James Rawlings. Translated from the Spanish by Elizabeth C. Wellington. Vanderbilt University Press. Global Black Writers in Translation, 2026
