= Esteban Beltré =

Dominican baseball player (born 1967)

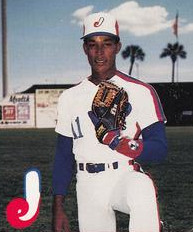
- Beltré in 1988
- Infielder
- Born: December 26, 1967 (age 58); Ingenio Quisqueya, Dominican Republic
- Batted: Right Threw: Right

MLB debut
- September 3, 1991, for the Chicago White Sox

Last MLB appearance
- June 5, 1996, for the Boston Red Sox

MLB statistics
- Batting average: .237
- Home runs: 1
- Runs batted in: 35
- Stats at Baseball Reference

Teams
- Chicago White Sox (1991–1992); Texas Rangers (1994–1995); Boston Red Sox (1996)

Esteban Valera Beltré (born December 26, 1967) is a Dominican former shortstop in Major League Baseball who played for the Chicago White Sox (1991–1992), Texas Rangers (1994–1995) and Boston Red Sox (1996). He batted and threw right-handed.

== Early life ==
Beltré was born in Ingenio Quisqueya, Dominican Republic.

== Career ==
In a five-season career, Beltré posted a .237 batting average (95-for-401) with one home run and 35 RBI in 186 games played.

== See also ==
- Players from Dominican Republic in MLB
