= Francisco Alvarado Arellano =

Venezuelan military man and politician

- Born: June 16, 1840; San Jose de los Llanos (Tachira, Venezuela)
- Died: October 5, 1917 (age 77); Caracas (Venezuela)
- Occupation(s): Politician, Military General

Francisco Alvarado Arellano (June 16, 1840 – October 5, 1917) was a Venezuelan military man and politician. He is known for participating in the Federal War besides general Pedro Manuel Rojas. He was also a national representative for the Táchira territory.

== Early life ==
Francisco was born in San José de los Llanos to Jose Ignacio Alvarado and Maria Encarnacion Arellano. He started his studies in the local school of Lobatera, but due to economic pressures he decided to move to Cúcuta in 1853 and work in a pharmacy.

== Military career ==
At 18, he decided to move to Pregonero (Táchira), here he would work in animal husbandry. Soon enough in 1859 the Federal War started, so the young Francisco headed over to Barinas to join the federal army commanded by Pedro Manuel Rojas. Arellano would stay in the army all throughout the war (1859–1863), when he achieved the rank of general.

== Political career ==
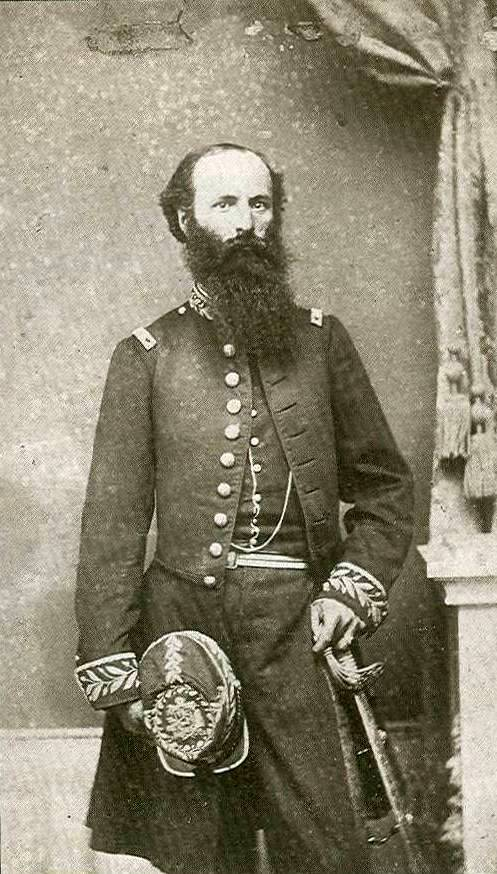
Antonio Guzman Blanco

After the end of the war Alvarado started to gain interest in regional politics. He is soon assigned the position of prefect of Táriba. He was later designated as member of the Legislation representing Colón, and in 1867 he would be elected a national representative for the state of Tachira.

Alvarez spent two years (1868–1870) in exile back in Cucuta. This was because his political standings contradicted the vision of the successful Revolucion Azul (1868). In 1870 Alvarez was able to return to Venezuela after Antonio Guzmán Blanco took control of the country. After returning to Tachira he quickly got to work, being named State procurer and later Director of Arms for the region. During this period he also assisted as national delegate for his home state of Gran Estado Los Andes.

Between 1884 and 1885, he served as governor of Tachira. Towards the end of 1886, he also became president of the Gran Estate Los Andes. That same year there was a surprise insurrection led by Officer Jorge Torcuato Colina, who took control of the state of Tachira.

After a short exile in Colombia, Alvarado Arellano returned as a strong antiguzmantist and was appointed as senator in the National Congress for the state of Tachira.

In 1899, president Ignacio Andrade offers him the lead of a division of the army to stop the invasion of Cipriano Castro, but Alvarado would renounce this position as he found himself disagreeing with the positions of this fellow military leaders.

== Final Days and Death ==
After retiring from public life, Alvarado wrote a book titled Memorias de un tachirense del siglo XIX, detailing his life during the turbulent times Venezuela suffered.

Alvarado died in extreme poverty and alone, October 5, 1917.
