= San Pedro de Macorís =

- City
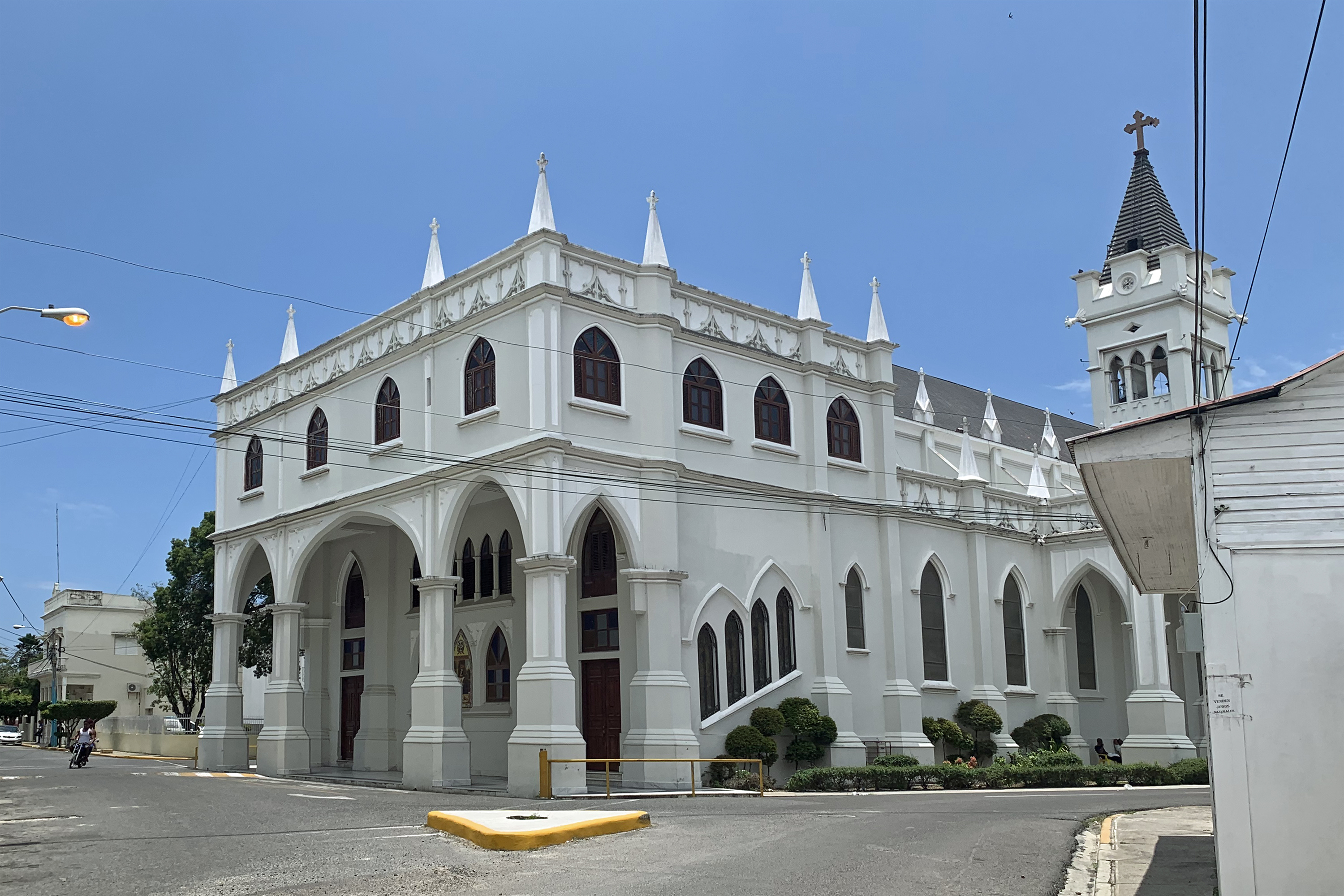
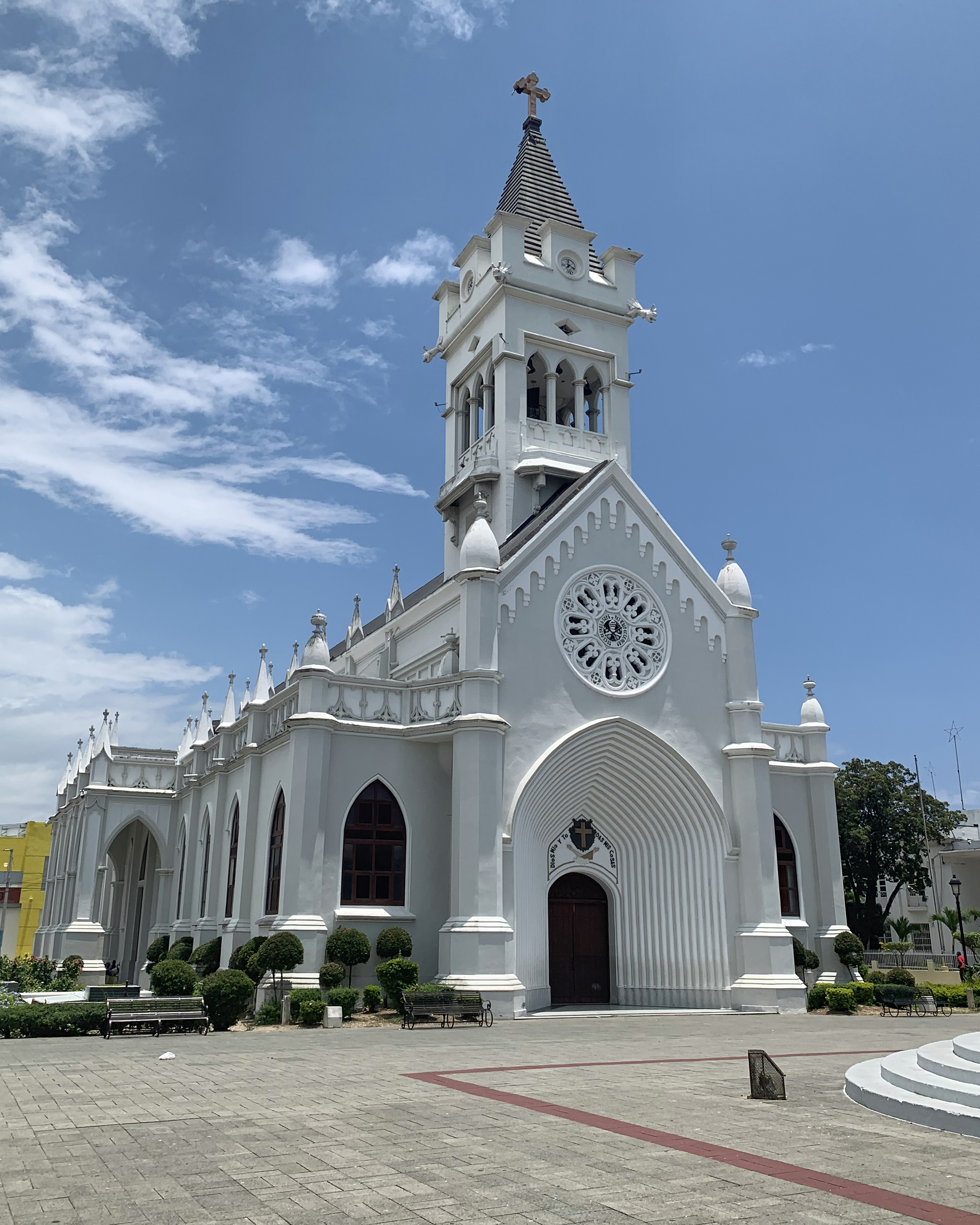
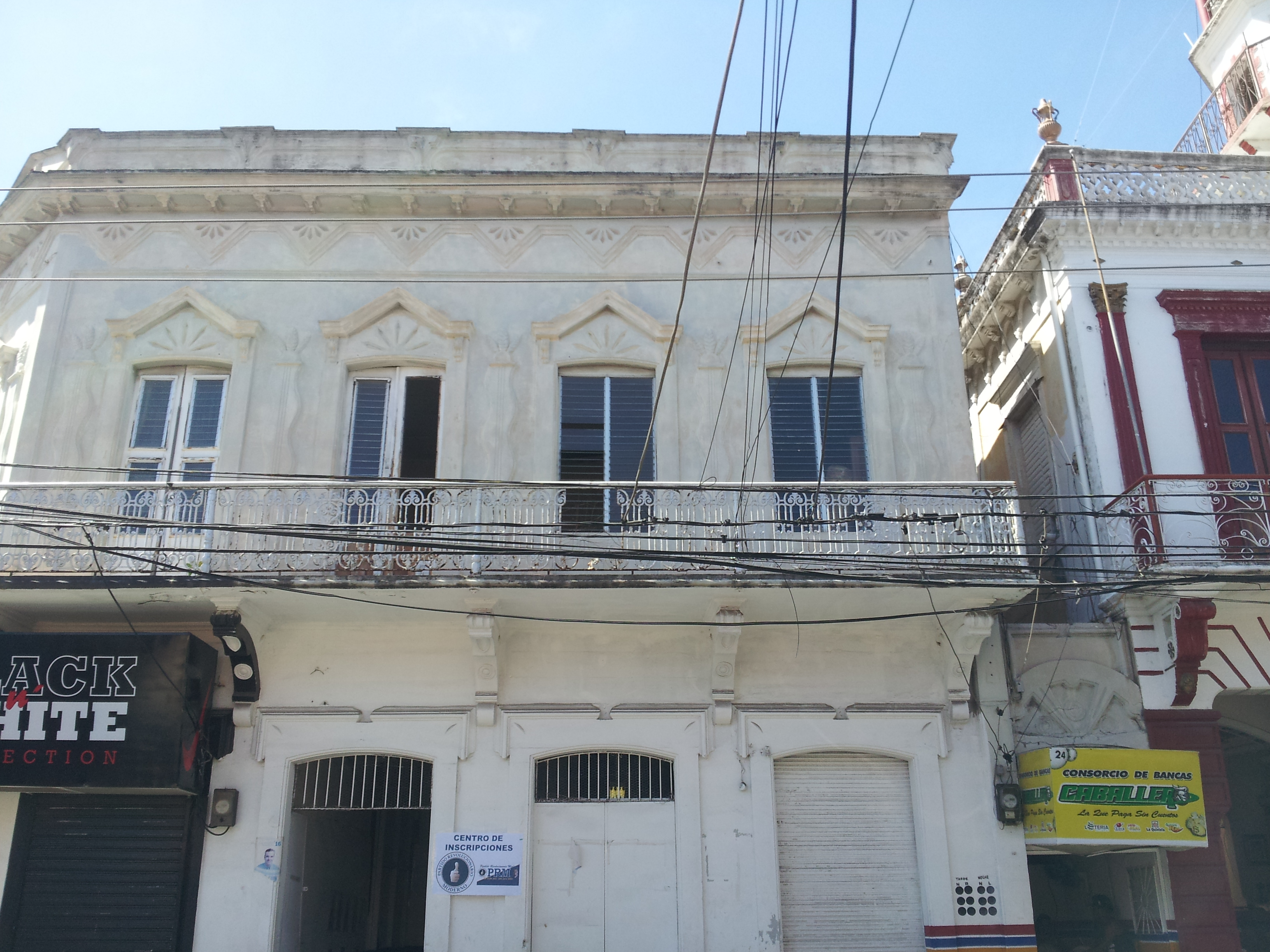
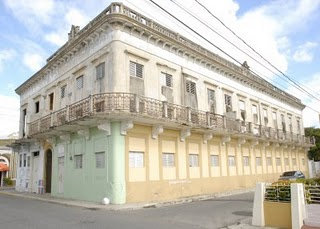
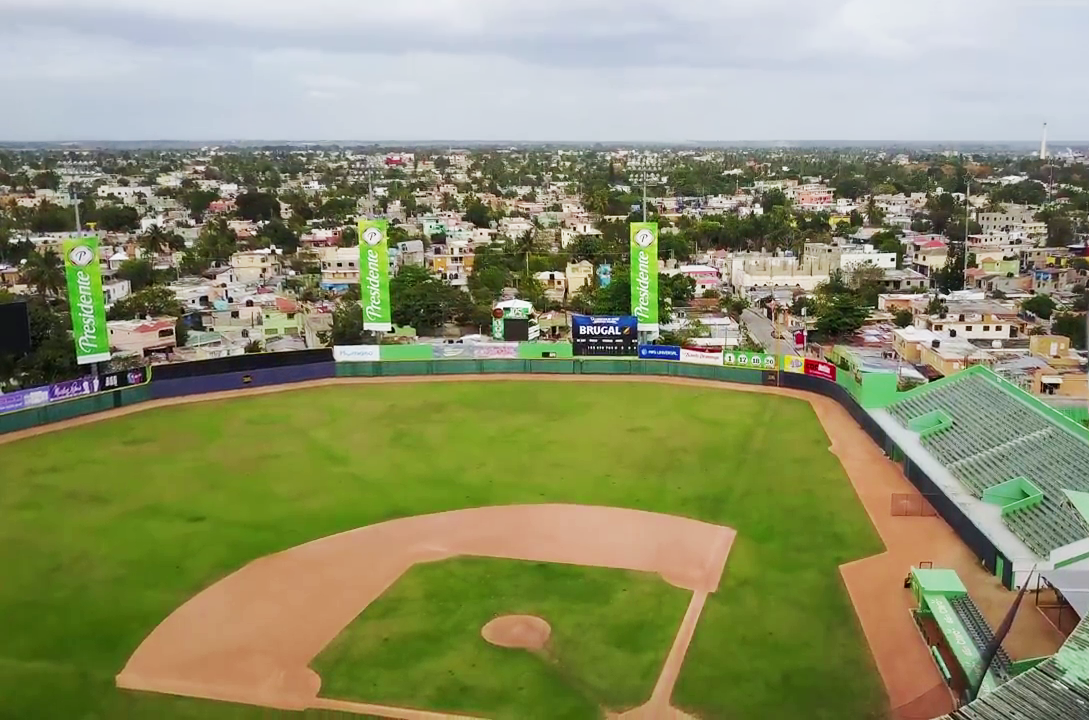
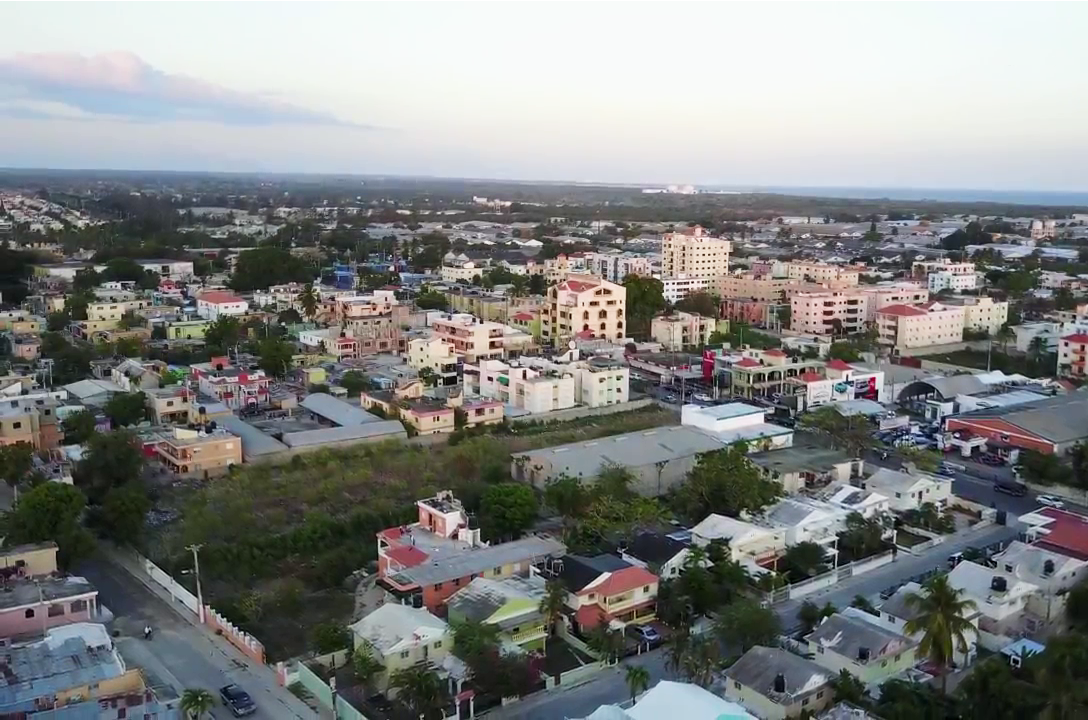
- Front and rear view of St. Peter's Cathedral, Old building, American chamber of commerce, Tetelo Vargas stadium and Oriental sector

- Coat of arms
- Nicknames: Sultan del Este, Macoris del Mar
- San Pedro de Macorís in the Dominican Republic
- Coordinates: 18°27′36″N 69°18′36″W
- Country: Dominican Republic
- Province: San Pedro de Macorís

Area
  - Total: 152.33 km^{2} (58.81 sq mi)
- Elevation: 4 m (13 ft)

Population (2022 census)
  - Total: 217,523
  - Density: 1,428.0/km^{2} (3,698.4/sq mi)
  - Demonym: Petromacorisano(a)
- Distance to – Santo Domingo: 70 km
- Municipal Districts: 0

San Pedro de Macorís is a city and municipality (municipio) in the Dominican Republic. It is the capital of the province of the same name in the eastern region of the country and is among the ten largest cities of the Dominican Republic. Including the entire municipality, San Pedro de Macorís has a population of approximately 217,000. The city is home to the Universidad Central del Este. San Pedro de Macorís is also noted for producing professional baseball players at a high per capita rate.

== Name ==
Four possible origins have been proposed for the name "San Pedro". One is that the name was chosen in honor of Saint Peter (San Pedro); another is that it references San Pedro Beach near the city's port. A third possibility is that it was a tribute to General Pedro Santana, who was president at the time, while another is that the name was chosen to distinguish the city from San Francisco de Macorís, a city in the north.

Macorís comes from the previous name of the Higuamo River, which appears in historical documents as the Macorix River. There is debate over whether the name is of Carib, Arawakan, or Ciguayo origin.

San Pedro de Macorís has been poetically referred to as "Macorís of the Sea" and the "Sultana of the East". It has also been referred to as the "Capital of the East".

== History ==
The population on the western bank of the Higuamo River increased after 1822 as refugees from Santo Domingo fled during the Haitian occupation of Santo Domingo. The Dominican Senate declared the region (Macorix) to be a military post in 1846 at the request of the inhabitants. At that time, Macorís was part of the Seybo province.

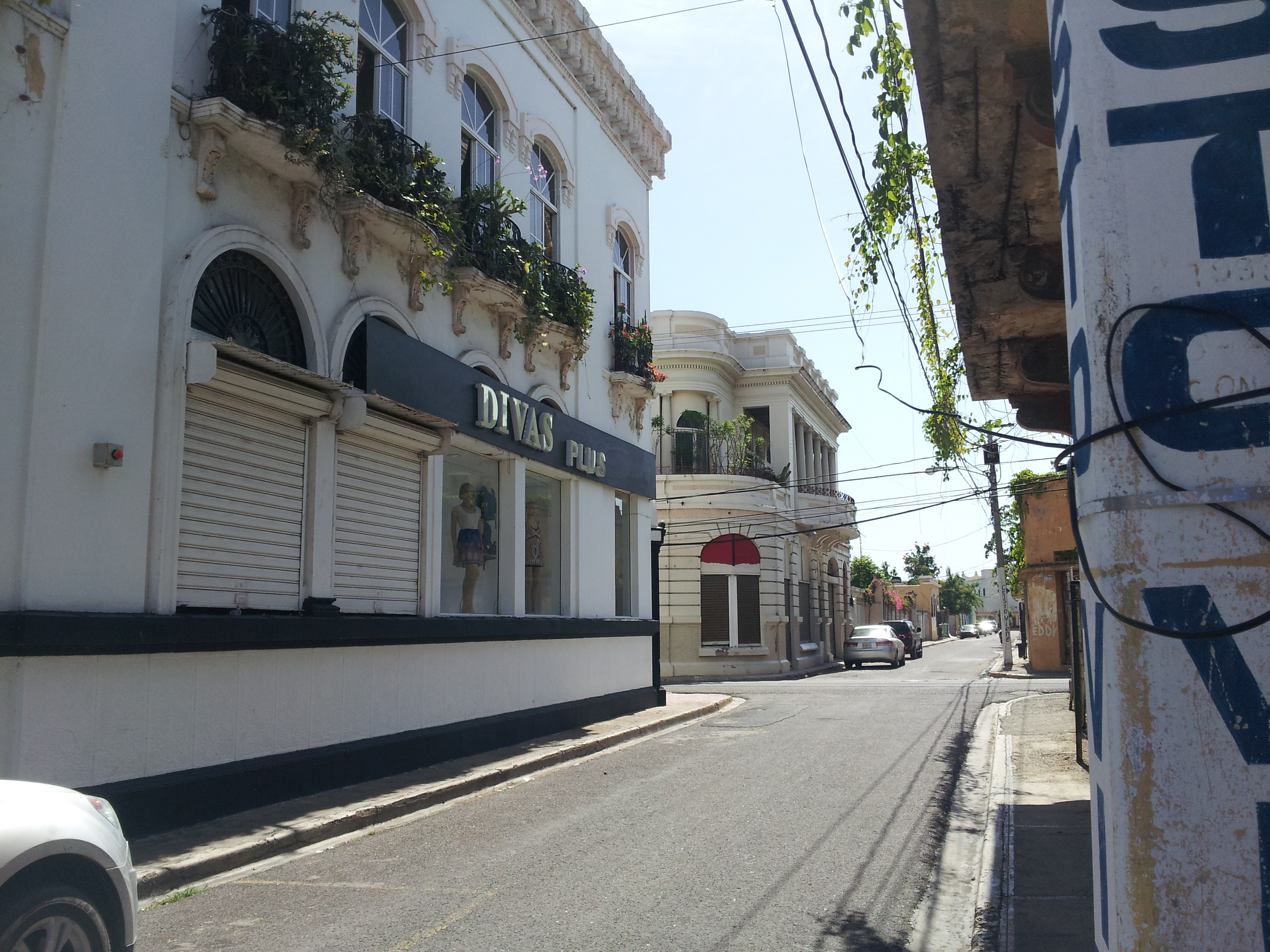
Calle Sánchez in the historic center of San Pedro de Macorís

After 1840, the inhabitants moved from the western side of the Higuamo River to the eastern side, where the city is located today. Over the years, the population gradually increased and dedicated itself to the production of basic provisions.

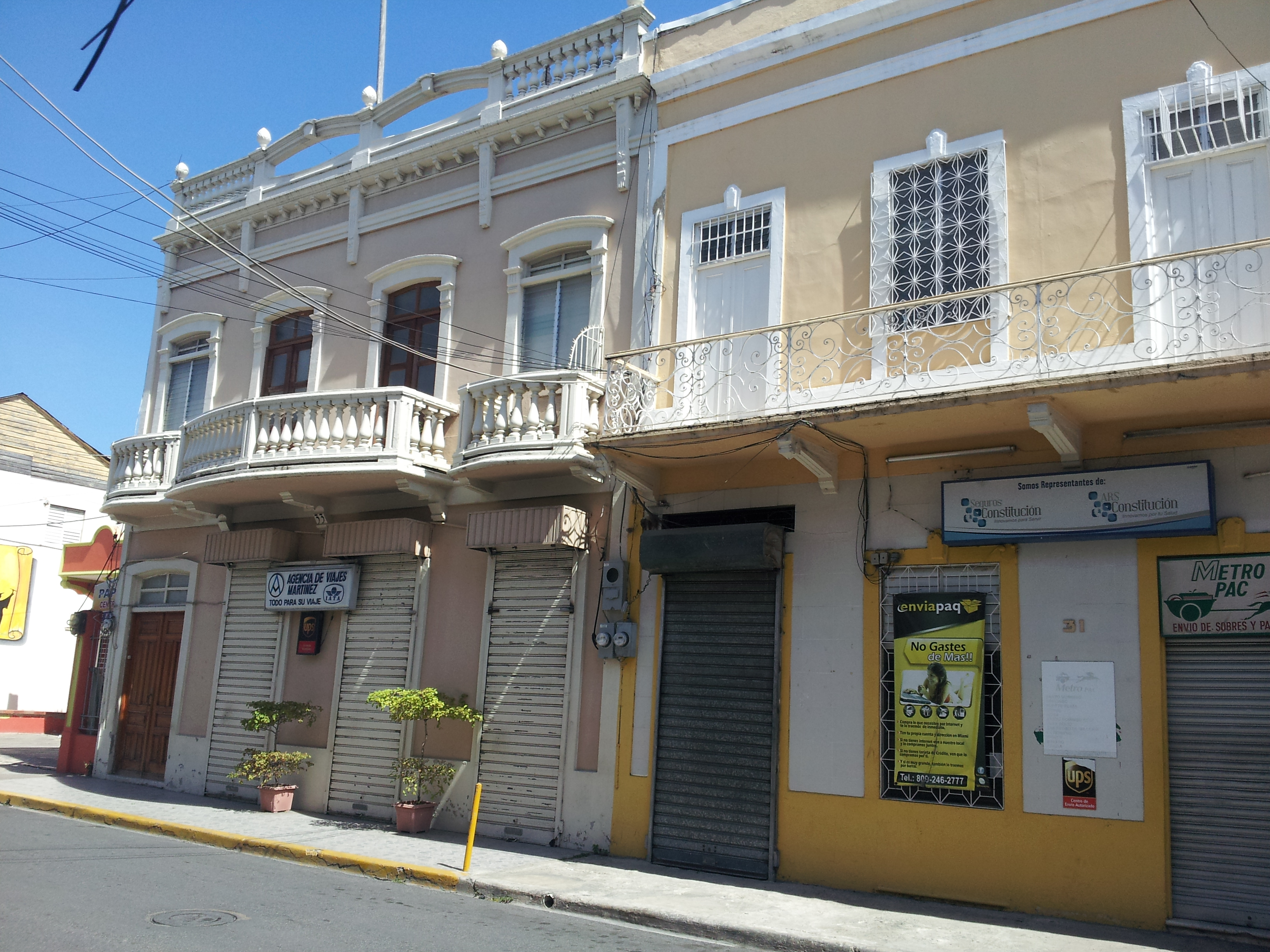
Historic center of San Pedro de Macorís

On October 1, 1856, the first Catholic church in Macorís was founded by Pedro Carrasco Capeller, a priest from San José de los Llanos. The church was subsequently destroyed and rebuilt several times. In 1910, the San Pedro Apóstol cathedral opened.

In 1858, the clergyman Elías González suggested changing the name Macorix to Macorís and adding the name of the patron saint, San Pedro (Saint Peter), at the beginning, making the full name San Pedro de Macorís. The name change was accepted and marked the beginning of the patronal festivals, which begin annually on June 22 and end on June 29.

San Pedro de Macorís experienced a wave of migration in the late 19th century from Cubans fleeing their country's War of Independence. They brought knowledge of sugarcane farming and contributed to making the sugar industry a major economic activity in the area. San Pedro de Macorís reached its peak during the first quarter of the 20th century, when its sugar production benefited from high prices on the international market as a result of the First World War. Many Europeans also settled in the city, making it a cosmopolitan urban center.

San Pedro de Macorís was the first Dominican city to receive seaplanes. Pan American Airways regularly flew its seaplanes into Macorís via the Higuamo River. At that time, the city had more commercial activity than the Santo Domingo. The next economic boom resulted in the recruitment of a large number of Afro-Caribbean workers from the Lesser Antilles. These workers and their descendants soon comprised the majority of the population in the city and are known as the "Cocolos of San Pedro de Macorís."

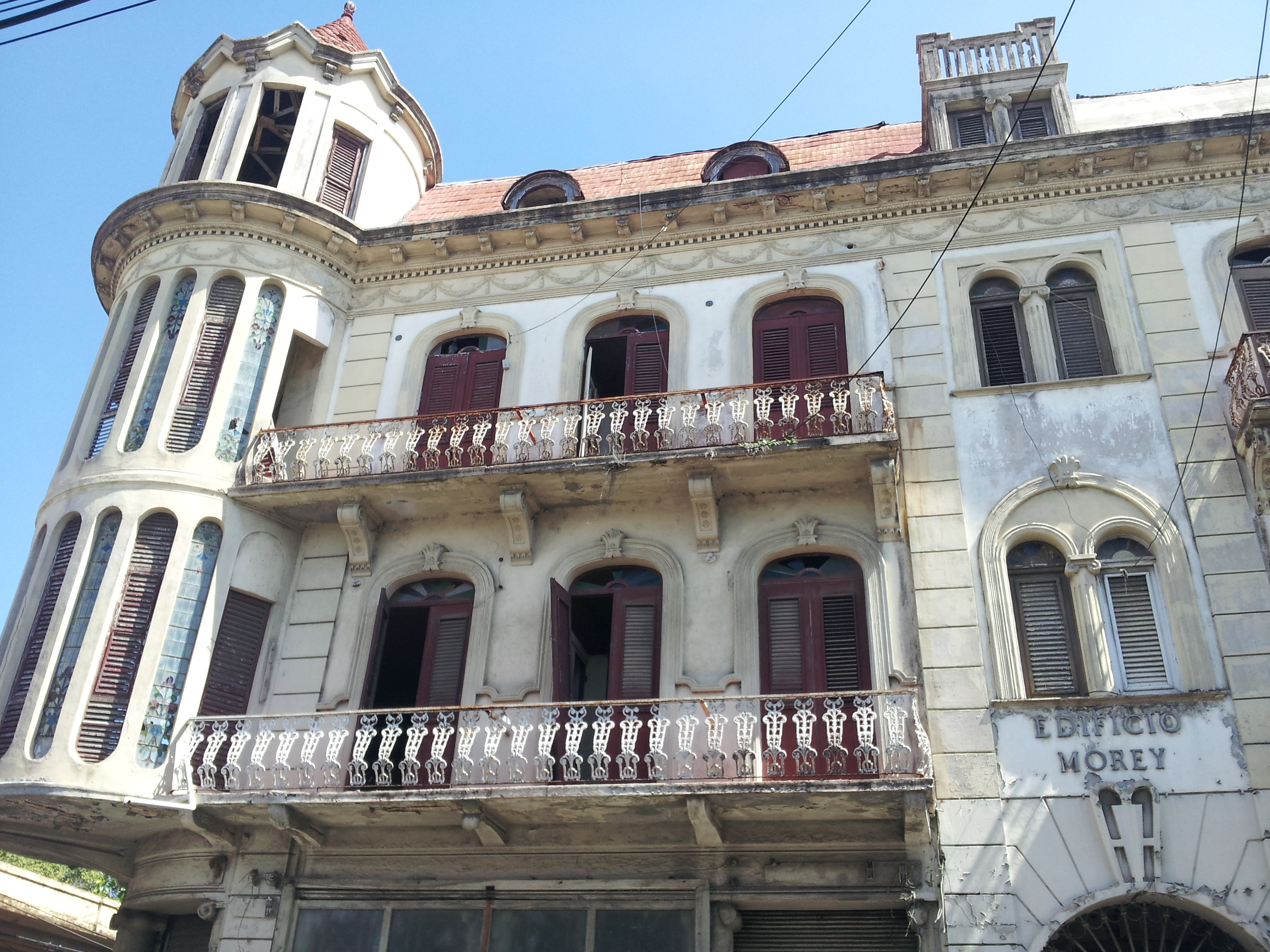
Morey building

San Pedro de Macorís was associated with several early developments, including the first firefighting corps, the first national baseball championship, the first town to have telephone and telegraph centers, the first racetrack, and the first boxing coliseum, among others. The first sugar factory was founded by Juan Amechazurra and milled for the first time on January 9, 1879. By 1894, there were many factories in the province that reached a high level of development. The rapid industrial development placed the young city among the main cities of the Republic. Intellectual culture grew at the same pace, with schools and the press; among the first newspapers were "Las Novedades", "Boletín", "La Locomotora" and "El Cable."

== Culture ==
Poets from San Pedro de Macorís include René del Risco, Pedro Mir, who held the title of National Poet, Esterbina Matos, Ludín Lugo, Juan Brayan, and Mateo Robinson.

Macorís produces "Guavaberry", a drink based on the guavaberry fruit, which is consumed during Christmas and has a sweet taste similar to wine. It is frequently consumed with rum as an infusion. Although the fruit is native to Hispaniola, its use as a beverage was introduced and spread by immigrants from the Eastern Caribbean, where colonists used it as a substitute for myrtleberry-infused schnapps.

The Malecón is also used as a gathering place for drinking and music.

=== City church of San Pedro de Macoris ===
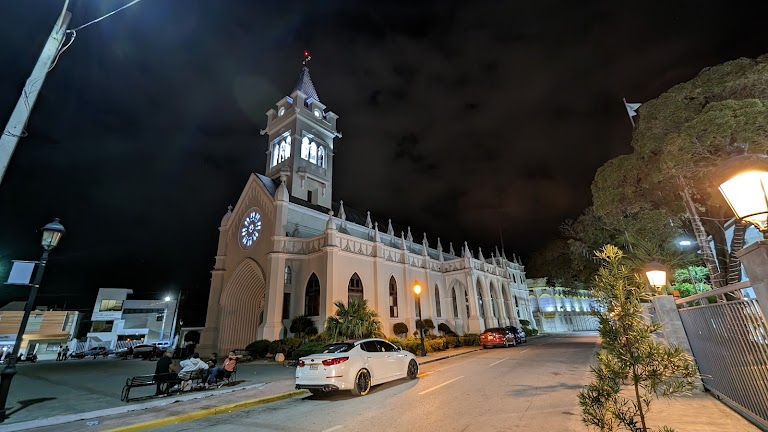

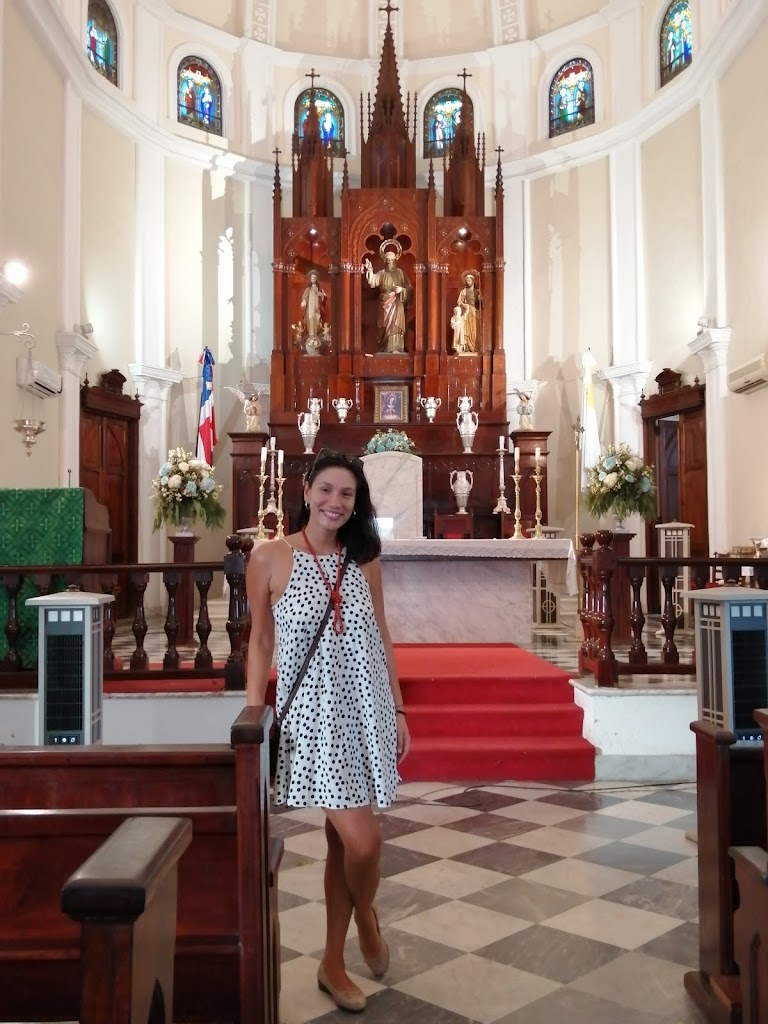

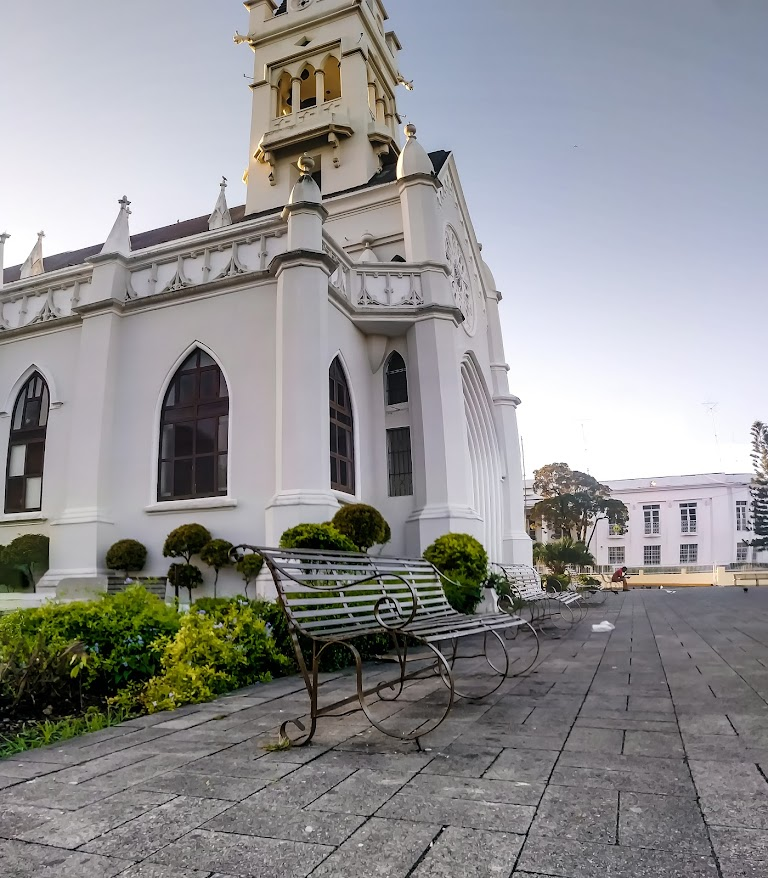

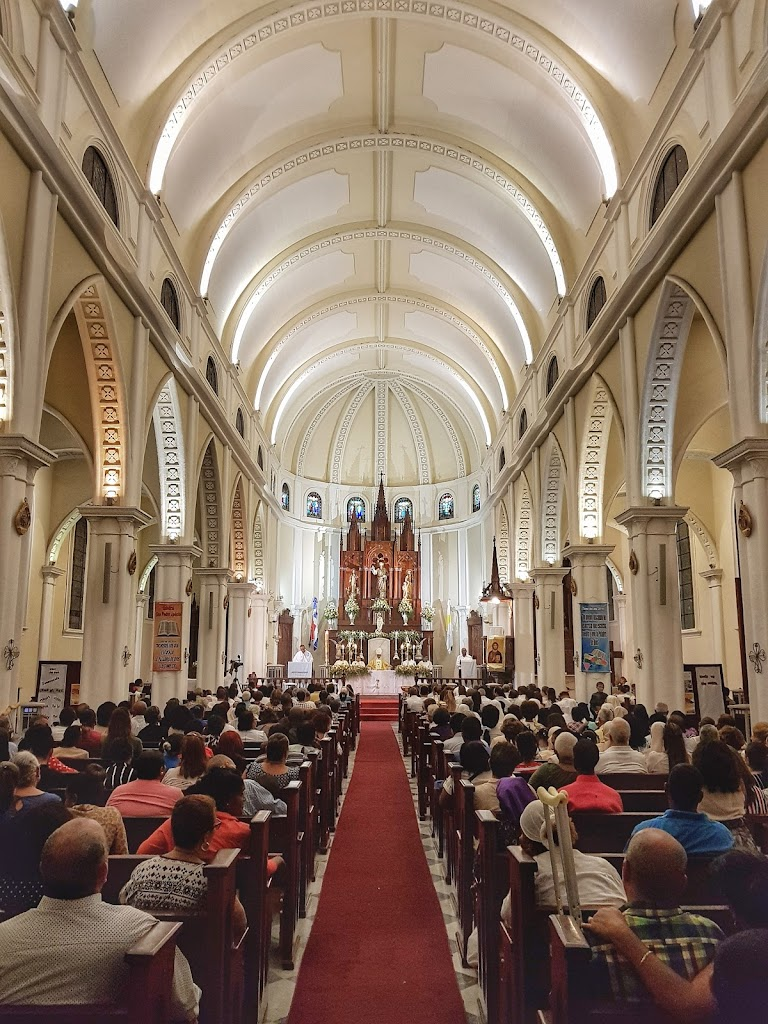

== Climate ==
San Pedro de Macorís has a tropical savanna climate (Köppen Aw) with consistently hot temperatures and a dry season from January to March.

Climate data for San Pedro de Macorís (1961–1990)
Month	Jan	Feb	Mar	Apr	May	Jun	Jul	Aug	Sep	Oct	Nov	Dec	Year
Record high °C (°F)	33.9 (93.0)	33.4 (92.1)	34.8 (94.6)	33.9 (93.0)	36.2 (97.2)	35.8 (96.4)	36.5 (97.7)	36.2 (97.2)	36.5 (97.7)	36.6 (97.9)	35.6 (96.1)	33.9 (93.0)	36.6 (97.9)
Mean daily maximum °C (°F)	29.5 (85.1)	29.6 (85.3)	30.1 (86.2)	30.5 (86.9)	30.9 (87.6)	31.5 (88.7)	31.9 (89.4)	32.0 (89.6)	31.9 (89.4)	31.4 (88.5)	30.7 (87.3)	29.8 (85.6)	30.8 (87.4)
Daily mean °C (°F)	24.4 (75.9)	24.6 (76.3)	25.0 (77.0)	25.6 (78.1)	26.3 (79.3)	27.0 (80.6)	27.3 (81.1)	27.4 (81.3)	27.3 (81.1)	26.9 (80.4)	26.0 (78.8)	24.9 (76.8)	26.1 (79.0)
Mean daily minimum °C (°F)	19.4 (66.9)	19.5 (67.1)	20.0 (68.0)	20.8 (69.4)	21.7 (71.1)	22.6 (72.7)	22.7 (72.9)	22.8 (73.0)	22.7 (72.9)	22.4 (72.3)	21.4 (70.5)	20.1 (68.2)	21.3 (70.3)
Record low °C (°F)	13.6 (56.5)	14.0 (57.2)	14.9 (58.8)	15.2 (59.4)	15.4 (59.7)	17.0 (62.6)	17.0 (62.6)	19.4 (66.9)	19.2 (66.6)	18.0 (64.4)	14.8 (58.6)	14.2 (57.6)	13.6 (56.5)
Average rainfall mm (inches)	31.1 (1.22)	29.9 (1.18)	35.9 (1.41)	50.0 (1.97)	133.4 (5.25)	99.7 (3.93)	90.9 (3.58)	128.4 (5.06)	145.8 (5.74)	145.9 (5.74)	91.8 (3.61)	56.7 (2.23)	1,039.5 (40.93)
Average rainy days (≥ 1.0 mm)	4.5	4.0	3.6	4.6	8.1	6.7	7.4	8.6	9.3	10.5	8.0	5.5	80.8
Source: NOAA

== Sports ==
=== Baseball ===
The city is home to the Estrellas Orientales of the Dominican Winter Baseball League, which plays at Estadio Tetelo Vargas.

San Pedro de Macorís has produced a large number of professional baseball players. The city has been referred to as "the Cradle of Shortstops." The Dominican capital of Santo Domingo has produced 106 Major League Baseball (MLB) players compared to San Pedro's 99, despite having a population ten times larger than that of San Pedro.

When immigrants were brought in from the Eastern Caribbean as contract labor for sugar plantations, they brought the sport of cricket. They formed teams and played against each other. The ownership and management of many of the sugar estates were American. The cricket teams were offered money by the players' plantation managers to switch sports, and they did. Dominicans learned the game watching teams composed of Eastern Caribbean players. Over time, Vic Power established a youth system in San Pedro de Macorís and was one of the largest influences on making the city one of the largest sources of baseball talent in the world.

Notable Major League Baseball players from San Pedro de Macorís include:

- Manny Acta
- Joaquín Andújar
- Rafael Batista
- George Bell
- Daniel Cabrera
- Robinson Canó
- Héctor Carrasco
- Rico Carty
- Juan Castillo
- Luis Castillo
- Jesús Colomé
- Johnny Cueto

- Mariano Duncan
- Tony Fernández
- Pepe Frías
- Damaso Garcia
- Domingo Germán
- Pedro González
- Pedro Guerrero
- José Jiménez
- Manny Jiménez
- Manuel Lee
- Josías Manzanillo
- Guillermo Mota

- Jhonkensy Noel
- José Offerman
- Alexi Ogando
- Jorge Polanco
- Rafael Ramírez
- Ben Rivera
- Juan Samuel
- Miguel Sanó
- Dennis Santana
- Julio Santana
- Alfonso Soriano
- Sammy Sosa

- Raimel Tapia
- Fernando Tatís
- Fernando Tatís Jr.
- Salomón Torres
- José Valverde

== Other notable people ==
- Bienvenido Fabián, composer
- Luis Flores, professional basketball player, 2009 top scorer in the Israel Basketball Premier League
- Sonia Silvestre, singer
- Algenis Perez Soto, actor
- Norberto James Rawlings, poet
- Bienvenido Bustamante, composer
- Ron Sanchez, head basketball coach, University of Virginia

== Transport ==
San Pedro de Macoris is served by one airline with commercial flights at Cueva Las Maravillas Airport.

== See also ==
- San Pedro de Macorís Province
- List of cities in the Dominican Republic
- History of the Dominican Republic
