= Consuelo, Dominican Republic =

Consuelo
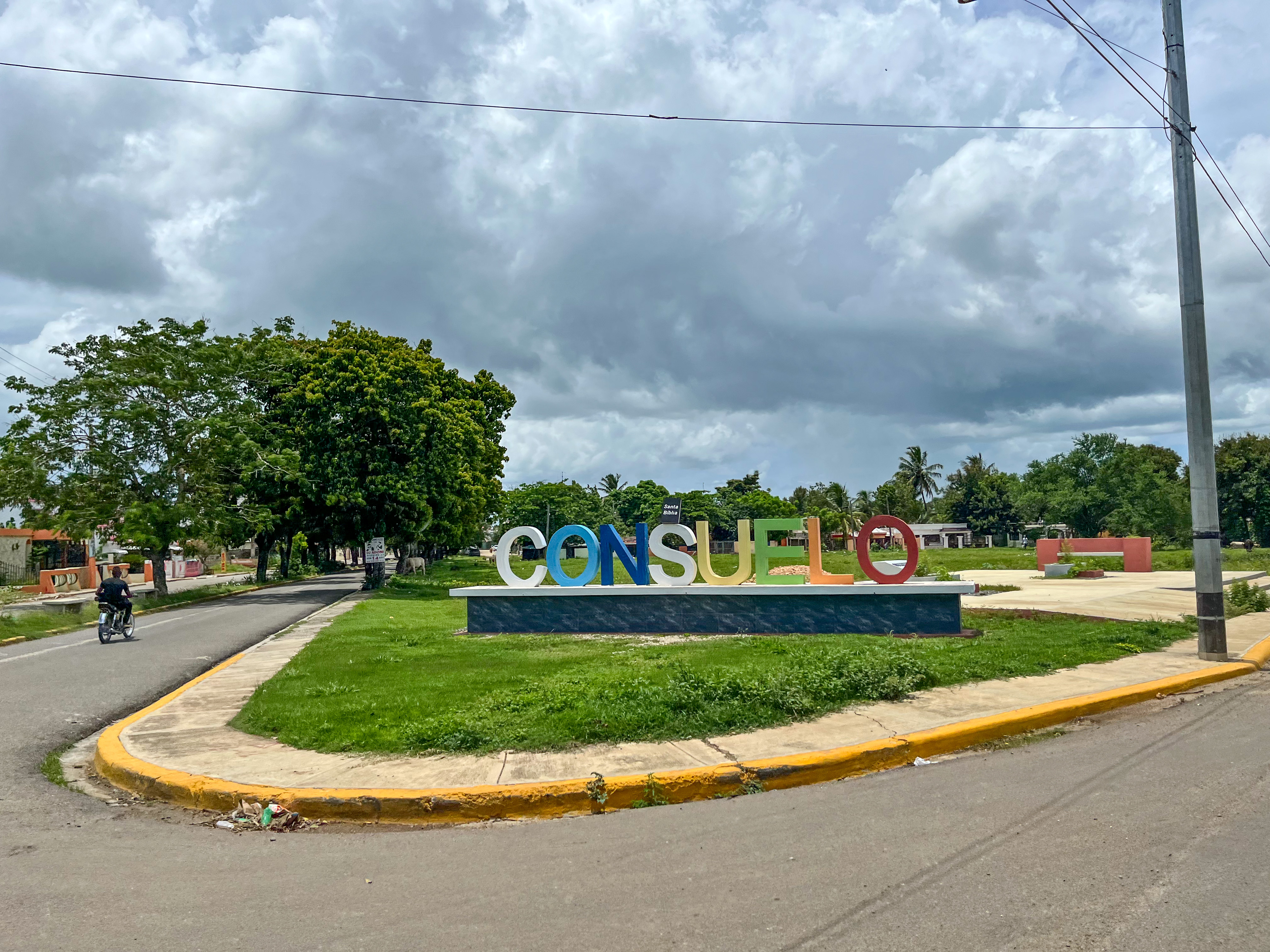

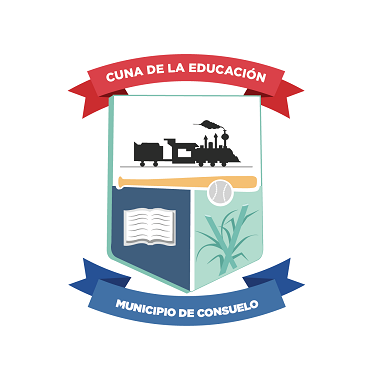
- Coat of arms

- Consuelo in the Dominican Republic
- Coordinates: 18°33′36″N 69°18′00″W
- Country: Dominican Republic
- Province: San Pedro de Macorís
- Established as a Municipality: July 1, 1998

Area
  - Total: 131.52 km^{2} (50.78 sq mi)

Population (2012)
  - Total: 60,000
  - Density: 460/km^{2} (1,200/sq mi)
- Municipal Districts: 0

Consuelo is a municipality (municipio) of the San Pedro de Macorís Province in the Dominican Republic.

For comparison with other municipalities and municipal districts see the list of municipalities and municipal districts of the Dominican Republic. There are a few different so called barrios in Consuelo: among others: Pueblo Nuevo, La Habana, Guachupita, Libertad, El Cachipero, Sueño Real, Los Jardines, Enriquillo, Hato Mayor, El Invi, El Kilombo, Guamita, and La Loma.

Consuelo is the actual birthplace of Sammy Sosa, a famous baseball player.
