= San José de los Llanos =

- San José de los Llanos in the Dominican Republic
- Coordinates: 18°37′12″N 69°30′00″W
- Country: Dominican Republic
- Province: San Pedro de Macorís

Area
  - Total: 436.46 km^{2} (168.52 sq mi)

Population (2012)
  - Total: 38,989
  - Density: 89.330/km^{2} (231.36/sq mi)
- Municipal Districts: 2

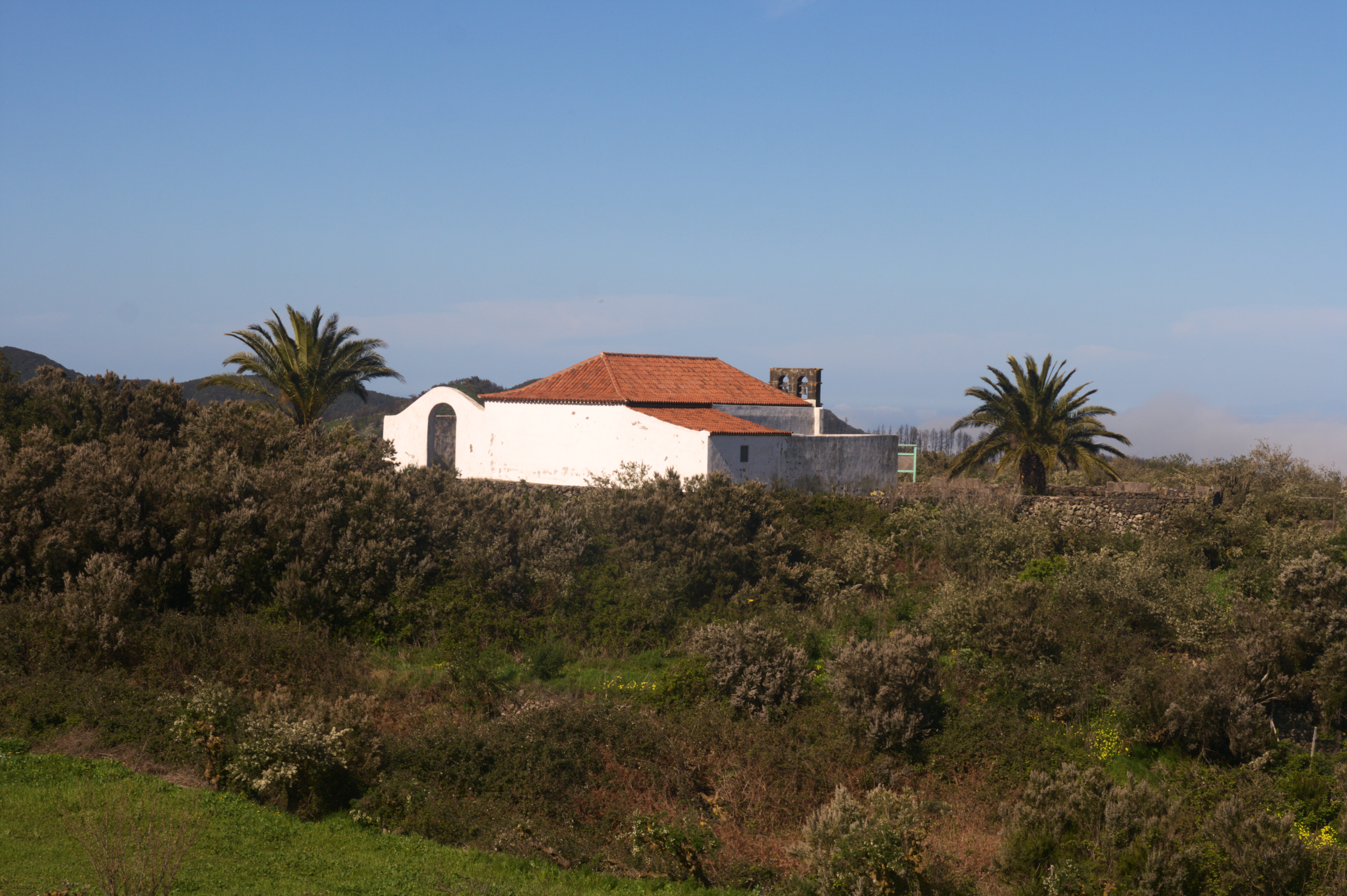
Ermita de San José in El Tanque, Tenerife

San José de los Llanos is a municipality (municipio) of the San Pedro de Macorís province in the Dominican Republic. It has 1,201 acres. The municipality includes the districts of El Puerto and Gautier. Originally emerging in the early 17th century as a rest stop for cattle ranchers along a royal road, the settlement grew to achieve major national significance during the Dominican War of Independence. It was here that Vicente Celestino Duarte organized the first regional branch of La Trinitaria and officially declared national independence on February 26, 1844, making it the first locality in the nation to do so, one day before the historic uprising in Santo Domingo.

== Geography ==
The city is located in the western region of the San Pedro de Macorís province in the Dominican Republic. Encompassing approximately 1,201.745 acres, it is divided into five sections and 54 settlements. It is bordered to the north and west by the Monte Plata province, to the south by the Santo Domingo province and its capital city, alongside San Pedro de Macorís. On the east, it is bordered by the Hato Mayor province. A defining natural landmark of the region is the historic Sabana del Guabacatur, a savanna landscape that stretches across its northwestern border from Monte Plata to El Puerto. Within the municipality there are two municipal districts (distritos municipales): Gautier and El Puerto.

== History ==
The community's origins date back to the early 17th century. Traveling cattle ranchers routinely used this route as a resting point. Then, the population grew gradually, bolstered by Canary Island immigrants and northern settlers from Montecristi, Puerto Plata, Bayajá, and Yaguana, who the Devastations of Osorio displaced, carried out by Antonio de Osorio.

As the community grew, it achieved significant cultural and political milestones. In 1620, the town witnessed the founding of the Brotherhood of San José, the first Catholic brotherhood in Santo Domingo. Centuries later, in 1838, Vicente Celestino Duarte organized the very first regional branch of the pro-independence secret society, La Trinitaria. This underground organizing culminated on February 26, 1844, when San José de los Llanos became the first locality in the nation to officially declare national independence, occurring a full day before Ramón Matías Mella fired his historic shot at the Puerta de la Misericordia. Following independence, it was designated as a municipality of Santo Domingo in 1845. It briefly became a military and political district of Santo Domingo during the Spanish annexation of the Dominican Republic before reverting to a municipality and was integrated into San Pedro de Macorís on June 23, 1882. Independence Day in San José de los Llanos is held one day before the Independence Day in the Dominican Republic.

== Notable Person ==
- Francisco Alvarado Arellano (1840–1917), Venezuelan military man and politician

== See also ==
- List of municipalities and municipal districts of the Dominican Republic
