= Bienvenido Fabián =

Musical artist

- Born: March 20, 1920; San Pedro de Macorís, Dominican Republic
- Died: November 23, 2000 (aged 80); Santo Domingo, Dominican Republic

Bienvenido Fabian (March 20, 1920 – November 23, 2000) was a composer from the Dominican Republic during the era of the dictator Rafael Trujillo.

Don Fabian composed famous ballads and Afro-Cuban music such as "Dos Alma" and "Tuya, Y Mas Que Tuya" made famous by the combo orchestra La Sonora Matancera and Celia Cruz throughout the 1950s and 1970s. Many compare the collaboration of the group La Sonora Matancera & Celia Cruz with Fabian to the likes of the Duke Ellington Orchestra.

== Discography ==
=== Fabian's compositions appear in albums such as ===
- Isidoro Flores y su conjunto – La Sabrosona (1960)
- Boogaloo Combo – Com Muito Ritmo (1972)
- La Sonora Matancera

=== Songs composed by Fabian ===
- Goza Negra,
- Mi noche fatal,
- Besarte,
- Di que no,
- Lo que te pido,
- Condena,
- De que color son tus ojos,
- Quien si no tú,
- Al fin te fuiste
