= San Pedro de Macorís Province =

Province of the Dominican Republic

San Pedro de Macorís
- Province
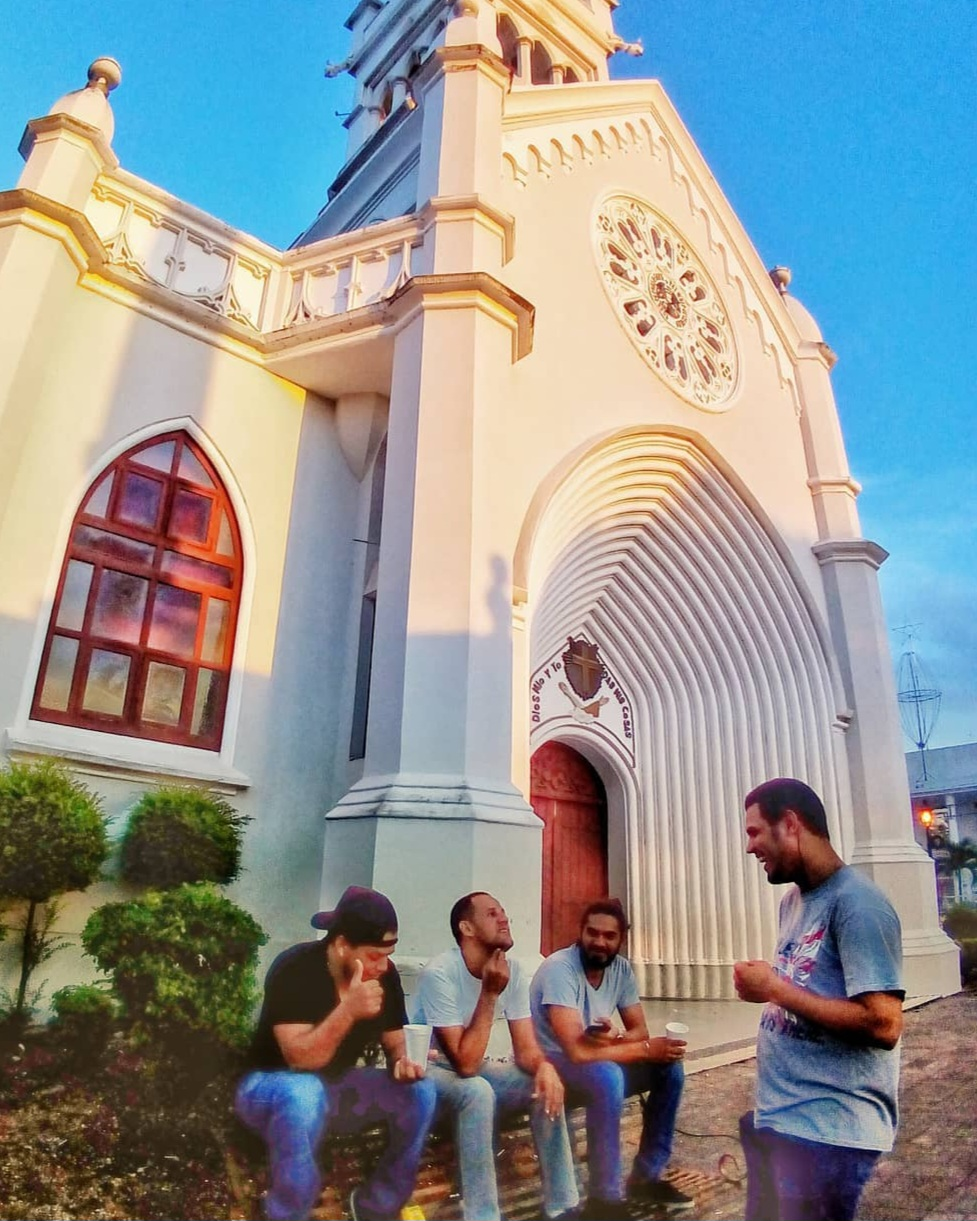

- Location of the San Pedro de Macorís Province
- Coordinates: 18°30′13″N 69°19′35″W
- Country: Dominican Republic
- Province since: 1907
- Capital: San Pedro de Macorís

Government
  - Type: Subdivisions
  - Body: 6 municipalities 2 municipal districts
  - Congresspersons: 1 Senator; 6 Deputies

Area
  - Total: 1,255.46 km^{2} (484.74 sq mi)

Population (2014)
  - Total: 392,911
  - Density: 312.962/km^{2} (810.567/sq mi)
- Time zone: UTC-4 (AST)
- Area code: 1-809 1-829 1-849
- ISO 3166-2: DO-23
- Postal Code: 21000

San Pedro de Macorís (Spanish pronunciation: [ˈsam ˈpeðɾo ðe makoˈɾis]) is a province of the Dominican Republic, also the name of its capital city. The city is fairly active due to its proximity to the national capital of Santo Domingo and also its role in the sugar industry. The province is informally known as San Pedro, SPM or Serie 23 for the first two numbers of their Dominican identification or Cedula.

Citizens from San Pedro de Macorís are called petromacorisanos. The culture of the province shares many similarities with those of the other eastern provinces. For example, during carnival season, the diablos (devils) (Guloyas/ Buloyas) tend to wield fuetes (whips), which relates to the traditional cattle farming of the whole region.

Serie 23 is a mecca for all Dominican culture and was the home to the DR's most famous writer, Pedro Mir. In the past years the beautiful architecture of Serie 23 has been used as a backdrop for several Hollywood feature films, such as Miami Vice, The Good Shepherd and Sugar. It often stands in for Havana, Cuba.

== Municipalities and municipal districts ==
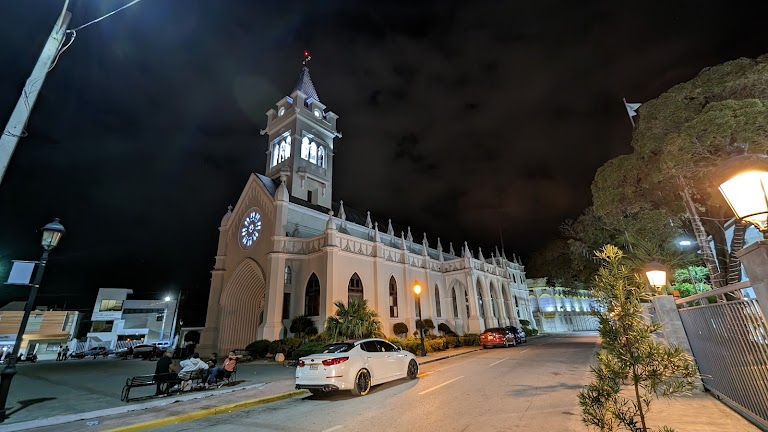
San Pedro de Macoris

The province as of June 20, 2006, is divided into the following municipalities (municipios) and municipal districts (distrito municipal - D.M.) within them:

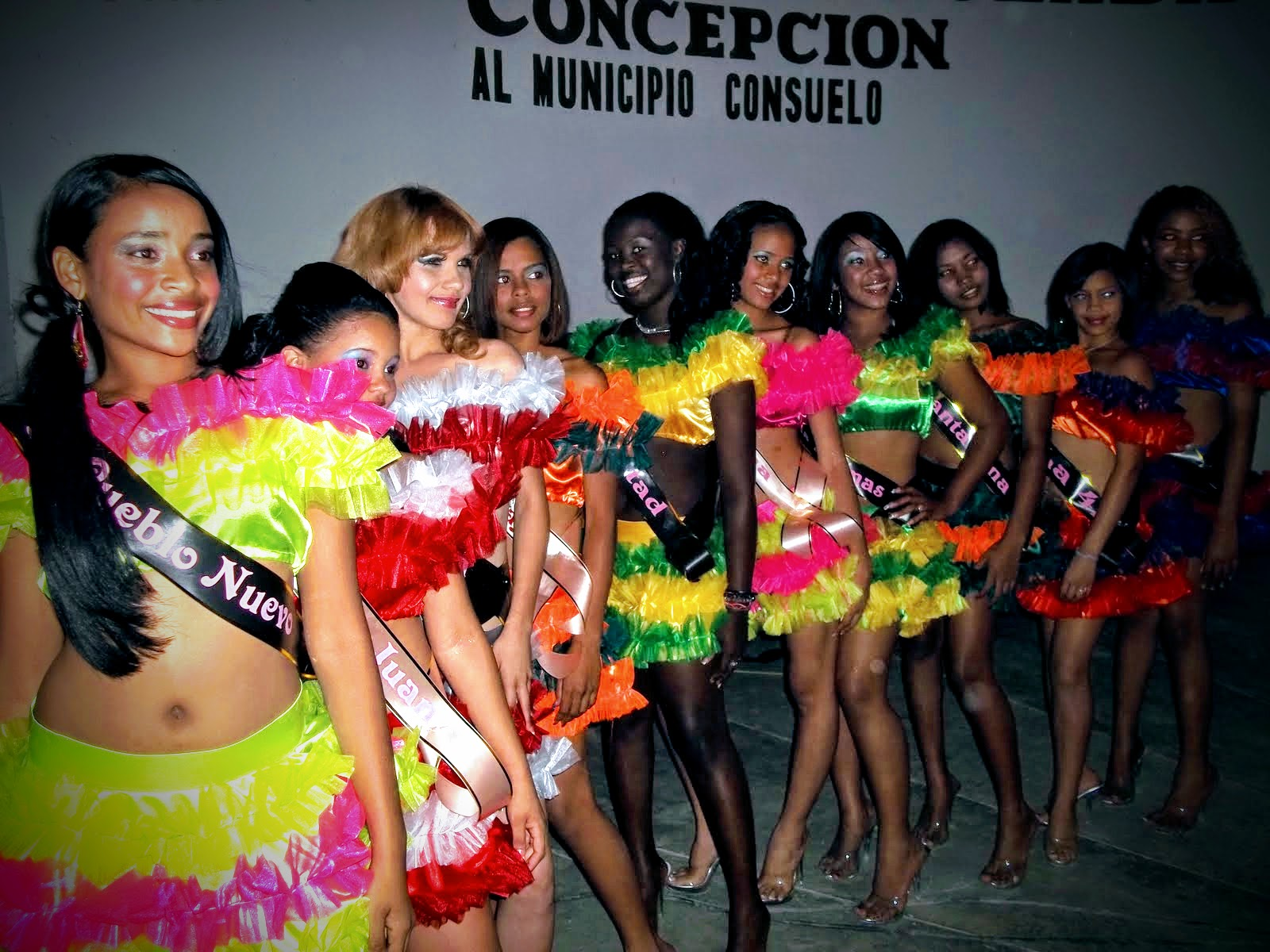
Women in Consuelo, San Pedro de Macoris, Dominican Republic

- Consuelo
- Guayacanes
- Quisqueya
- Ramón Santana
- San José de los Llanos
  - Gautier (D.M.)
  - El Puerto (D.M.)
- San Pedro de Macorís

The following is a sortable table of the municipalities and municipal districts with population figures as of the 2012 census. Urban population are those living in the seats (cabeceras literally heads) of municipalities or of municipal districts. Rural population are those living in the districts (Secciones literally sections) and neighborhoods (Parajes literally places) outside of them.

| Name | Total population | Urban population | Rural population |
|---|---|---|---|
| Consuelo | 36,588 | 28,063 | 8,525 |
| Guayacanes | 37,889 | 37,144 | 745 |
| Quisqueya | 24,885 | 16,316 | 8,569 |
| Ramon Santana | 16,548 | 2,569 | 13,979 |
| San José de los Llanos | 38,989 | 7,856 | 31,133 |
| San Pedro de Macorís | 263,951 | 218,055 | 45,896 |
| San Pedro de Macorís province | 418,850 | 310,003 | 108,847 |

For comparison with the municipalities and municipal districts of other provinces see the list of municipalities and municipal districts of the Dominican Republic.

== Economy ==
There are several Ingenios azucareros (sugar mills or, literally, sugar engines) distributed in the province which handle the load of its large sugar cane plantations. This industry in turn allowed for San Pedro De Macorís to serve as the base of operations for two of the DR's three biggest rum distilleries. Bovine cattle is another important economic asset, as it is in all of the other eastern provinces thanks to the vast Llanura Oriental (Eastern Plain). San Pedro also hosts many hotel and tourism ventures, ranging from low-tier resorts to top tier exclusive Golf and Country Clubs.

== Sports ==
The province enjoys a rarely disputed reputation as the capital of Dominican baseball, providing a relatively high number of professional baseball players. Many of these players are drafted to play in the USA's Major Leagues of Baseball, with Sammy Sosa being the most notable player from SPM in recent years (see a full list of Dominican players). Baseball players from this city often come from poor homes and use baseball as a way to earn money for their families. Many ball players from this city are major philanthropists as well.

== See also ==
- Cocolo
