= Guayacanes, Dominican Republic =

Guayacanes
- Location within the Dominican Republic
- Coordinates: 18°27′12″N 69°27′00″W
- Country: Dominican Republic
- Province: San Pedro de Macorís

Area
  - Total: 129.78 km^{2} (50.11 sq mi)

Population (2012)
  - Total: 37,889
  - Density: 291.95/km^{2} (756.14/sq mi)

Guayacanes is a municipality located in the San Pedro de Macorís Province of the Dominican Republic.

== Location ==
The municipality is located about 16 kilometers west of the city of San Pedro de Macorís and 40 km east of Santo Domingo.
