= Quisqueya, Dominican Republic =

Quisqueya
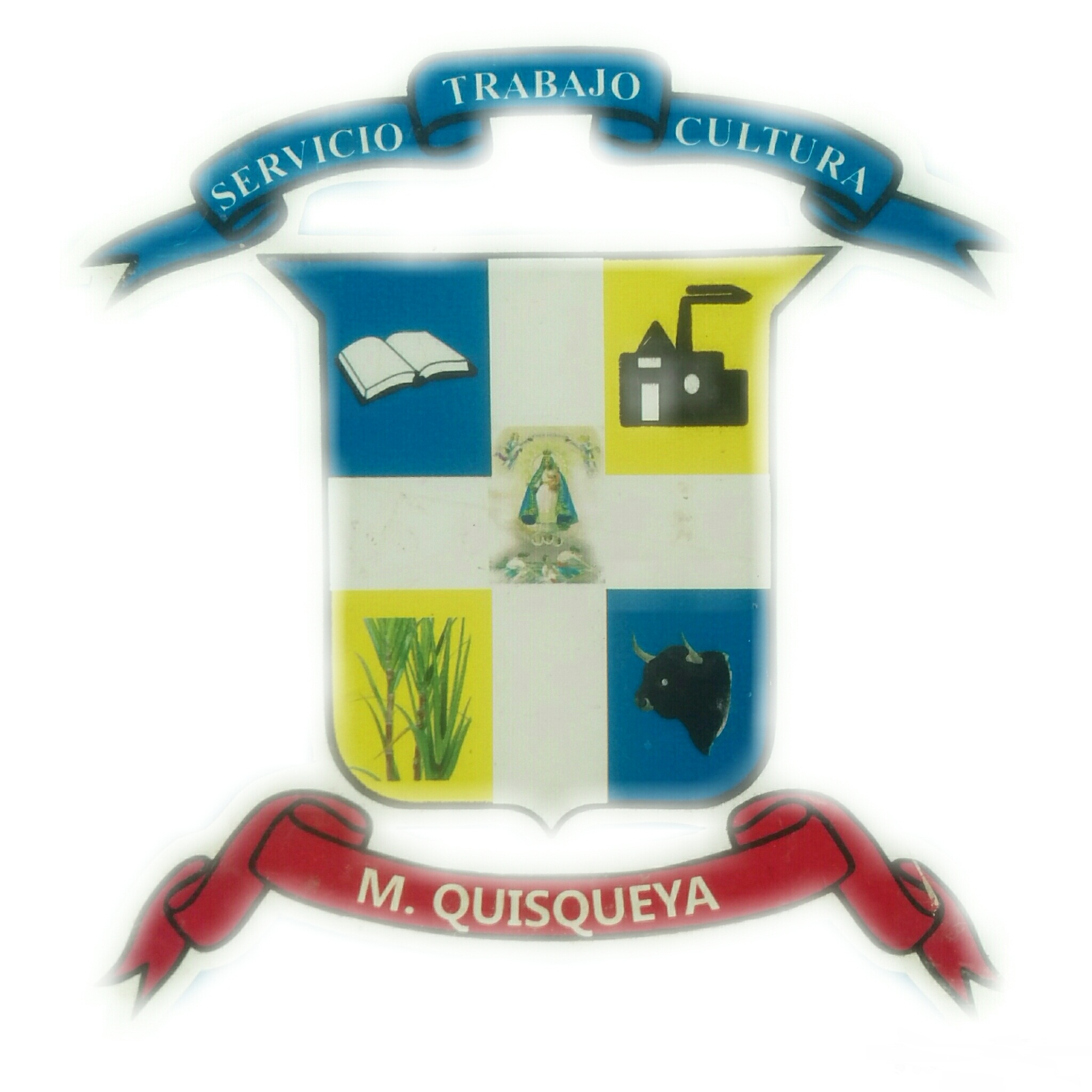
- Coat of arms

- Quisqueya in the Dominican Republic
- Coordinates: 18°33′15″N 69°24′20″W
- Country: Dominican Republic
- Province: San Pedro de Macorís
- Established as a Municipality: September 19, 1996

Area
  - Total: 155.45 km^{2} (60.02 sq mi)

Population (2012)
  - Total: 24,885
  - Density: 160.08/km^{2} (414.61/sq mi)
- Municipal Districts: 0

Quisqueya is a municipality (municipio) of the San Pedro de Macorís province in the Dominican Republic.
