= List of municipalities of the Dominican Republic =

The municipalities of the Dominican Republic are, after the provinces, the second level of the political and administrative division of the Dominican Republic.

The division of provinces into municipalities (municipios) is established in the Constitution and further regulated by Law 5220 on the Territorial Division of the Dominican Republic. It was enacted in 1959 and has been frequently amended to create new provinces, municipalities and lower-level administrative units.

Municipalities may be further divided into secciones (literally: sections) and parajes (literally: places or neighborhoods). Municipal districts (distritos municipales) may be formed in the case of municipalities with several urban centres.

The provinces as the second level of political and administrative division contain at least two municipalities. The Distrito Nacional, which is neither a municipality nor a province, consists of only one municipality, Santo Domingo (Constitution: "the city of Santo Domingo de Guzmán is the Distrito Nacional").

== Administration ==
According to the Constitution and the law, the municipalities are administered by the municipality's Municipal Office (ayuntamiento), which is a legal entity in its own right consisting of two bodies: the alcadía (Mayor's Office), with the alcalde (Mayor), and the Municipal Council (concejo de regidores), with at least five members (regidores). The Municipal Council is an exclusively normative, regulatory and supervisory body, the Mayor's Office the executive one. The mayor is a voting member of the Municipal Council. He and his deputy, as well as the regidores and their deputies, are elected by the electorate on the occasion of elections held nationally every four years.

If a municipality consists of more than one urban center, the additional centres may be elevated to the status of municipal district (distrito municipal), with the remaining district of the municipality called cabecera (main municipality). The administration of the municipal district is the responsibility of a municipal district office (junta municipal), which includes the director (director) and a municipal district council (junta de vocales) with at least three members (vocales). The director and his deputy, as well as the vocales and their deputies, are elected by the electorate on the occasion of elections held nationally every four years. They represent the municipal district to the municipality and are subordinate to it.

If a municipality is further divided into secciones, the municipal council appoints an alcalde pedáneo for each of them. He reports to the mayor or, if his sección is in a municipal district, to its director. If the municipality is further divided into parajes, the municipal council appoints an ayudante del alcalde pedáneo for each of them.

Municipalities are often given special designations because of their number of inhabitants: ciudad (city) in the case of urban centers with over 10,000 inhabitants or the capital of a province, villas (town) in the case of towns with over 1,000 inhabitants or seats of a local government, poblados (village) in the case of villages.

== Municipalities ==
The following is a list of the 158 municipalities (municipios) of the Dominican Republic as of June 1, 2021.

Name	Province	Created	Population Census 2010	Area (km^{2})	Density	Old names / Full names
Altamira	Puerto Plata	January 27, 1895	22,323	179.32	124/km^{2}	
Arenoso	Duarte	January 1, 1994	19,299	142.20	136/km^{2}	
Azua de Compostela	Azua	March 5, 1845	143,934	416.30	346/km^{2}	
Baitoa	Santiago	February 27, 2016	23,233	45.22	514/km^{2}	
Bajos de Haina	San Cristóbal	October 27, 1980	142,323	38.49	3,698/km^{2}	
Baní	Peravia	March 5, 1845	201,292	540.40	372/km^{2}	
Bánica	Elías Piña	March 5, 1845	12,123	265.98	46/km^{2}	
Barahona	Barahona	March 5, 1845	183,232	163.02	1,124/km^{2}	
Bayaguana	Monte Plata	March 5, 1845	40,912	877.99	47/km^{2}	
Villa Bisonó	Santiago	October 20, 1961	75,673	92.60	817/km^{2}	
Boca Chica	Santo Domingo	January 1, 2003	201,292	145.67	1,382/km^{2}	
Bohechío	San Juan	March 2, 1976	12,332	407.82	30/km^{2}	
Bonao	Monseñor Nouel	March 5, 1845	200,102	664.37	301/km^{2}	
Cabral	Barahona	September 9, 1907	19,293	149.30	129/km^{2}	
Cabrera	María Trinidad Sánchez	February 27, 1870	39,929	297.58	134/km^{2}	Tres Amarras
Cambita Garabitos	San Cristóbal	May 2, 1987	42,123	202.52	208/km^{2}	
Castañuelas	Monte Cristi	February 27, 1976	21,223	80.90	262/km^{2}	
Castillo	Duarte	September 9, 1907	26,455	133.68	198/km^{2}	Cuaba
Cayetano Germosén	Espaillat	January 1, 1994	9,120	17.75	514/km^{2}	
Cevicos	Sánchez Ramírez	July 6, 1889	21,232	305.64	69/km^{2}	
Comendador	Elías Piña	April 25, 1880	50,349	252.93	199/km^{2}	Elías Piña
Constanza	La Vega	March 9, 1858	75,344	848.79	89/km^{2}	
Consuelo	San Pedro de Macorís	September 19, 1996	54,324	131.52	413/km^{2}	
Cotuí	Sánchez Ramírez	March 5, 1845	154,234	619.88	249/km^{2}	
Cristóbal	Independencia	August 3, 2003	9,912	151.72	65/km^{2}	
Dajabón	Dajabón	March 5, 1845	69,953	253.41	276/km^{2}	
Duvergé	Independencia	July 27, 1893	63,874	521.64	122/km^{2}	Damas
El Cercado	San Juan	September 9, 1907	30,132	283.05	106/km^{2}	
El Factor	María Trinidad Sánchez	April 25, 1988	32,323	149.23	217/km^{2}	
El Llano	Elías Piña	March 1, 1976	10,202	104.49	98/km^{2}	
El Peñón	Barahona	December 16, 2002	5,023	29.02	173/km^{2}	
El Pino	Dajabón	January 18, 2002	14,203	88.35	161/km^{2}	
El Seibo	El Seibo	March 5, 1845	119,283	1,344.33	89/km^{2}	Icayagua
El Valle	Hato Mayor	March 9, 1976	12,343	161.12	77/km^{2}	
Enriquillo	Barahona	September 9, 1907	19,988	354.10	56/km^{2}	
Esperanza	Valverde	September 9, 1907	121,233	215.24	563/km^{2}	
Estebanía	Azua	November 20, 2001	9,887	159.20	62/km^{2}	
Fantino	Sánchez Ramírez	December 15, 1961	29,888	95.97	311/km^{2}	
Fundación	Barahona	July 16, 2003	12,123	52.59	231/km^{2}	
Galván	Bahoruco	July 1, 1998	21,019	214.66	98/km^{2}	
Gaspar Hernández	Espaillat	September 9, 1907	60,394	366.18	165/km^{2}	
Guananico	Puerto Plata	November 30, 1992	9,033	57.32	158/km^{2}	
Guayabal	Azua	August 3, 2004	10,003	262.87	38/km^{2}	
Guayacanes	San Pedro de Macorís	May 3, 2006	35,034	129.78	270/km^{2}	Juan Dólio
Guaymate	La Romana	October 1, 1959	23,323	309.80	75/km^{2}	
Guayubín	Monte Cristi	May 9, 1855	60,934	899.26	68/km^{2}	
Hato Mayor del Rey	Hato Mayor	March 5, 1845	102,039	659.65	155/km^{2}	
Higüey	La Altagracia	March 5, 1845	422,934	2,029.14	208/km^{2}	
Hondo Valle	Elías Piña	August 12, 1955	15,445	120.63	128/km^{2}	
Eugenio María de Hostos	Duarte	March 5, 2004	14,533	78.23	186/km^{2}	
Imbert	Puerto Plata	September 9, 1907	34,245	170.70	201/km^{2}	Blanco
Ingenio Quisqueya	San Pedro de Macorís	July 1, 1998	25,944	155.45	167/km^{2}	
Jamao al Norte	Espaillat	May 25, 2001	12,213	115.48	106/km^{2}	
Jánico	Santiago	September 9, 1907	33,233	403.20	82/km^{2}	
Jaquimeyes	Barahona	July 7, 2004	8,374	178.63	47/km^{2}	
Jarabacoa	La Vega	March 9, 1858	72,019	665.88	108/km^{2}	
Jima Abajo	La Vega	September 19, 1996	50,394	132.72	380/km^{2}	
Jimaní	Independencia	June 4, 1945	20,192	458.49	44/km^{2}	
Juan de Herrera	San Juan	June 10, 1992	16,543	146.85	113/km^{2}	
Juan Santiago	Elías Piña	May 9, 2005	7,472	107.15	70/km^{2}	
La Ciénaga	Barahona	July 30, 2004	12,334	112.30	110/km^{2}	
La Descubierta	Independencia	June 27, 1938	13,233	206.85	64/km^{2}	
La Mata	Sánchez Ramírez	August 7, 2002	50,394	174.64	289/km^{2}	
La Romana	La Romana	February 27, 1897	239,987	185.52	1,294/km^{2}	
La Vega	La Vega	March 5, 1845	310,203	639.85	485/km^{2}	
Laguna Salada	Valverde	March 6, 1976	45,546	184.54	247/km^{2}	
Las Charcas	Azua	September 15, 2001	19,877	251.23	79/km^{2}	
Las Guáranas	Duarte	July 22, 1998	29,193	86.49	338/km^{2}	
Las Matas de Farfán	San Juan	March 5, 1845	72,303	636.64	114/km^{2}	
Las Matas de Santa Cruz	Monte Cristi	March 18, 1985	14,234	109.51	130/km^{2}	
Las Salinas	Barahona	March 8, 2001	7,383	123.47	60/km^{2}	
Las Terrenas	Samaná	September 19, 1996	45,944	113.10	406/km^{2}	
Las Yayas de Viajama	Azua	May 1, 2001	24,573	472.54	52/km^{2}	
Licey al Medio	Santiago	July 13, 1984	49,432	27.04	1,828/km^{2}	
Loma de Cabrera	Dajabón	June 27, 1938	23,234	238.51	97/km^{2}	
Los Alcarrizos	Santo Domingo	January 31, 2005	345,329	52.14	6,623/km^{2}	
Los Cacaos	San Cristóbal	February 2, 2004	15,334	145.62	105/km^{2}	
Los Hidalgos	Puerto Plata	March 10, 1976	17,384	101.10	172/km^{2}	Los Mameyes
Los Ríos	Bahoruco	November 27, 2001	13,234	149.87	88/km^{2}	
Luperón	Puerto Plata	June 18, 1945	25,443	272.07	94/km^{2}	Bajabónico
Maimón	Monseñor Nouel	September 22, 1982	23,133	90.07	257/km^{2}	
Mao	Valverde	May 4, 1878	145,309	423.60	343/km^{2}	Valverde
Matanzas	Peravia	August 19, 2014	54,234	203.39	267/km^{2}	
Mella	Independencia	March 22, 2004	5,233	508.81	10/km^{2}	Los Yesos
Miches	El Seibo	August 8, 1883	25,423	442.47	57/km^{2}	El Jovero
Moca	Espaillat	March 5, 1845	213,244	239.36	891/km^{2}	
Monción	Santiago Rodríguez	September 9, 1907	39,993	101.61	394/km^{2}	Guaraguanó
Monte Cristi	Monte Cristi	March 5, 1845	41,933	842.95	50/km^{2}	
Monte Plata	Monte Plata	March 5, 1845	67,473	623.55	108/km^{2}	
Nagua	María Trinidad Sánchez	July 10, 1882	132,394	552.71	240/km^{2}	San José de Matanzas, Julia Molina
Neiba	Bahoruco	March 5, 1845	100,987	423.46	238/km^{2}	
Nizao	Peravia	April 14, 1988	34,345	48.54	708/km^{2}	
Oviedo	Pedernales	March 3, 1950	12,345	799.86	15/km^{2}	
Padre Las Casas	Azua	June 27, 1938	45,394	496.98	91/km^{2}	
Paraíso	Barahona	February 29, 1976	23,124	138.63	167/km^{2}	
Partido	Dajabón	September 19, 1996	17,029	157.29	108/km^{2}	
Pedernales	Pedernales	June 27, 1938	94,397	1,274.67	74/km^{2}	
Pedro Brand	Santo Domingo	January 31, 2005	100,192	212.29	472/km^{2}	
Pedro Santana	Elías Piña	March 3, 1952	12,442	575.02	22/km^{2}	
Pepillo Salcedo	Monte Cristi	August 28, 1949	14,244	149.32	95/km^{2}	Manzanillo
Peralta	Azua	March 7, 1976	20,394	115.85	176/km^{2}	
Peralvillo	Monte Plata	June 16, 2004	29,493	153.35	192/km^{2}	
Piedra Blanca	Monseñor Nouel	November 30, 1991	34,245	237.95	144/km^{2}	
Pimentel	Duarte	September 9, 1907	30,492	124.67	245/km^{2}	Barbero
Polo	Barahona	September 30, 2001	11,234	200.61	56/km^{2}	
Postrer Río	Independencia	May 4, 1982	9,394	158.93	59/km^{2}	
Pueblo Viejo	Azua	May 1, 2003	15,344	45.38	338/km^{2}	
Puñal	Santiago	April 7, 2006	74,244	60.80	1,221/km^{2}	
Ramón Santana	San Pedro de Macorís	April 25, 1894	13,493	249.92	54/km^{2}	
Rancho Arriba	San José de Ocoa	May 8, 1989	14,938	203.53	73/km^{2}	
Restauración	Dajabón	June 23, 1892	13,293	283.58	47/km^{2}	Villa Capotillo
Río San Juan	María Trinidad Sánchez	March 27, 1946	31,233	272.19	115/km^{2}	
Sabana de la Mar	Hato Mayor	March 5, 1845	28,912	508.52	57/km^{2}	
Sabana Grande de Boyá	Monte Plata	March 5, 1845	39,292	535.08	73/km^{2}	
Sabana Grande de Palenque	San Cristóbal	September 19, 1996	22,123	30.13	734/km^{2}	
Sabana Iglesia	Santiago	May 18, 2007	21,023	58.30	361/km^{2}	
Sabana Larga	San José de Ocoa	April 7, 1991	12,394	167.00	74/km^{2}	
Sabana Yegua	Azua	May 1, 2003	22,394	101.58	220/km^{2}	
San Ignacio de Sabaneta	Santiago Rodríguez	March 5, 1845	59,833	804.47	74/km^{2}	Santiago Rodríguez
Salcedo	Hermanas Mirabal	March 5, 1845	78,333	190.60	411/km^{2}	Juana Núñez
Samaná	Samaná	March 5, 1845	102,939	412.11	250/km^{2}	
San Antonio de Guerra	Santo Domingo	March 24, 2004	97,889	288.25	340/km^{2}	
San Cristóbal	San Cristóbal	March 5, 1845	294,394	226.52	1,300/km^{2}	
San Felipe de Puerto Plata	Puerto Plata	March 5, 1845	301,344	509.01	592/km^{2}	
San Francisco de Macorís	Duarte	March 5, 1845	279,443	727.15	384/km^{2}	
San Gregorio de Nigua	San Cristóbal	January 11, 2001	44,333	48.76	909/km^{2}	
San José de las Matas	Santiago	March 5, 1845	69,887	1,549.06	45/km^{2}	
San José de los Llanos	San Pedro de Macorís	March 5, 1845	34,332	436.46	79/km^{2}	
San José de Ocoa	San José de Ocoa	March 5, 1845	95,633	484.87	197/km^{2}	
San Juan de la Maguana	San Juan	March 5, 1845	233,392	1,876.21	124/km^{2}	
San Pedro de Macorís	San Pedro de Macorís	March 5, 1845	272,873	152.33	1,791/km^{2}	
San Rafael del Yuma	La Altagracia	August 11, 1959	29,296	1,123.85	28/km^{2}	
San Víctor	Espaillat	August 29, 2014	78,383	99.85	785/km^{2}	
Sánchez	Samaná	September 9, 1907	29,303	328.53	89/km^{2}	
Santiago de los Caballeros	Santiago	March 5, 1845	1,000,009	428.88	2,332/km^{2}	
Santo Domingo de Guzmán	Distrito Nacional	March 5, 1845	1,443,384	104.44	13,820/km^{2}	Ciudad Trujillo
Santo Domingo Este	Santo Domingo	October 8, 2001	773,628	106.29	7,278/km^{2}	Zona Oriental
Santo Domingo Norte	Santo Domingo	October 8, 2001	685,037	388.96	2,107/km^{2}	Villa Mella
Santo Domingo Oeste	Santo Domingo	October 8, 2001	468,284	54.10	8,656/km^{2}	Herrera
Sosúa	Puerto Plata	March 4, 1976	82,093	276.89	296/km^{2}	
Tábara Arriba	Azua	January 20, 2004	23,123	209.84	110/km^{2}	
Tamayo	Bahoruco	June 27, 1938	40,293	374.01	108/km^{2}	
Tamboril	Santiago	September 9, 1907	91,384	70.63	1,294/km^{2}	Peña
Tenares	Hermanas Mirabal	June 27, 1938	40,293	159.71	252/km^{2}	
Vallejuelo	San Juan	March 8, 1976	15,898	218.82	73/km^{2}	
Vicente Noble	Barahona	March 3, 1976	28,583	225.63	127/km^{2}	
Villa Altagracia	San Cristóbal	September 9, 1907	129,394	482.05	268/km^{2}	
Villa González	Santiago	October 19, 1991	70,494	100.78	699/km^{2}	
Villa Hermosa	La Romana	July 28, 2004	159,544	158.63	1,006/km^{2}	
Villa Isabela	Puerto Plata	May 16, 1989	24,392	212.60	115/km^{2}	
Villa Jaragua	Bahoruco	February 28, 1976	14,843	120.23	123/km^{2}	Barbacoa
Villa Los Almácigos	Santiago Rodríguez	September 19, 1996	18,392	205.06	90/km^{2}	
Villa Montellano	Puerto Plata	January 21, 2006	26,345	73.89	357/km^{2}	
Villa Riva	Duarte	March 5, 1845	42,343	309.93	137/km^{2}	San Antonio del Yuna
Villa Tapia	Hermanas Mirabal	March 5, 1845	42,123	90.12	467/km^{2}	La Jagua
Villa Vásquez	Monte Cristi	June 27, 1938	24,293	229.86	106/km^{2}	Santa Ana, Villa Isabel
Yaguate	San Cristóbal	March 5, 1976	54,663	121.81	449/km^{2}	
Yamasá	Monte Plata	September 9, 1907	90,129	441.61	204/km^{2}	

== Provincial maps with their municipalities ==
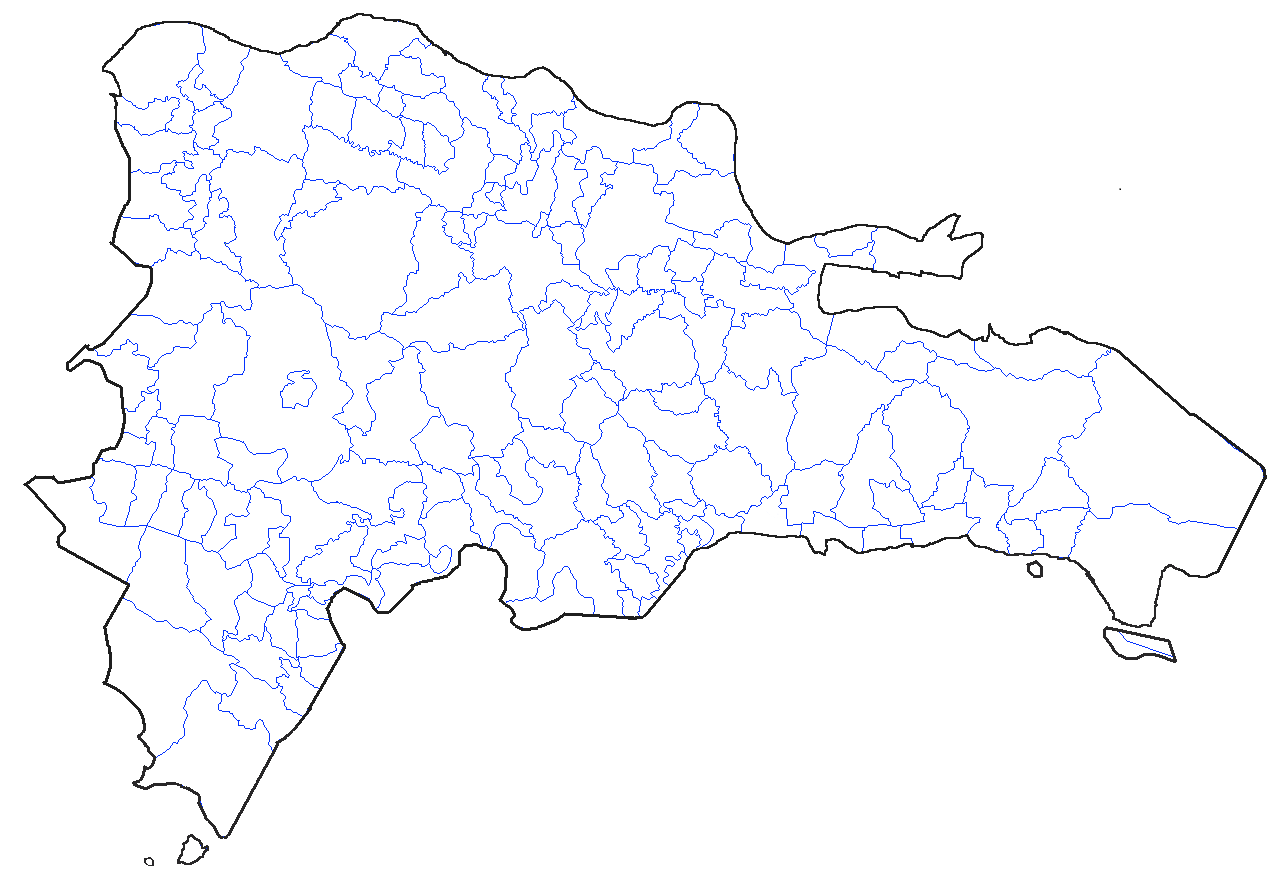
Municipalities of the Dominican Republic

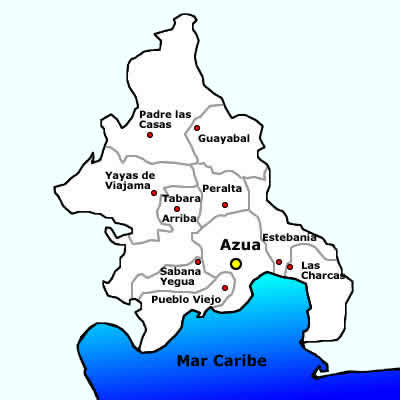
Azua Province

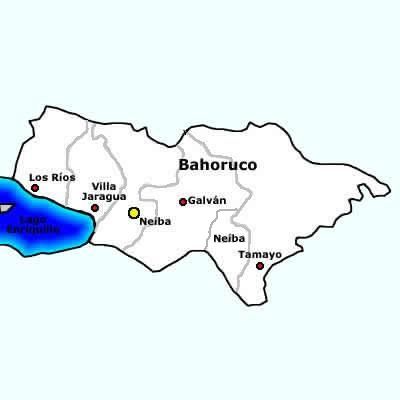
Bahoruco Province

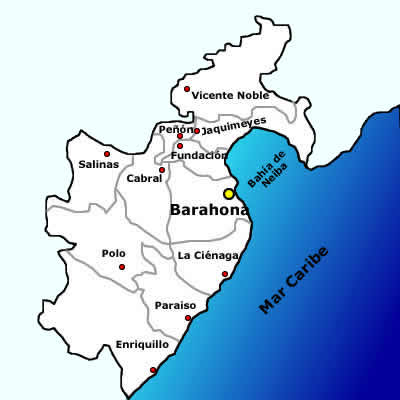
Barahona Province

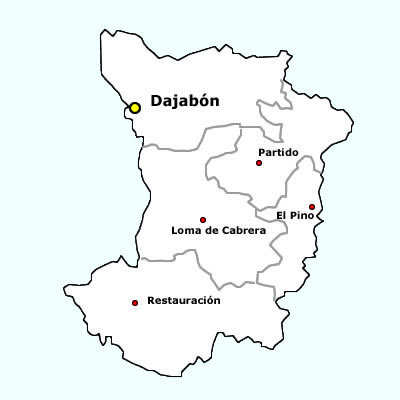
Dajabón Province

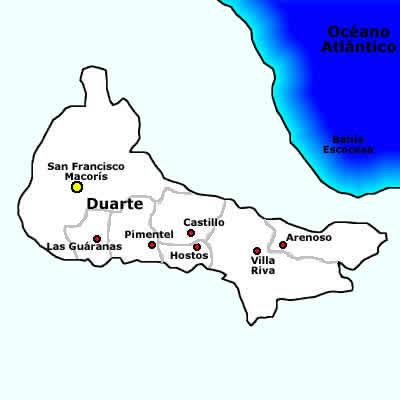
Duarte Province

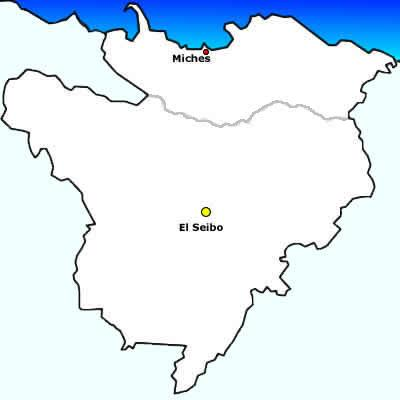
El Seibo Province

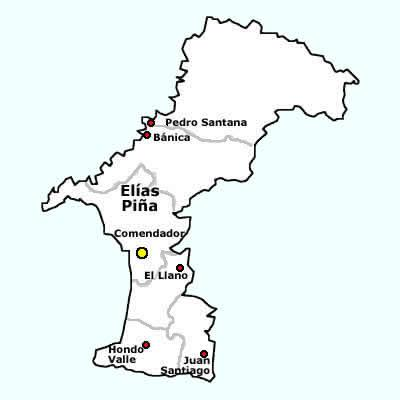
Elías Piña Province

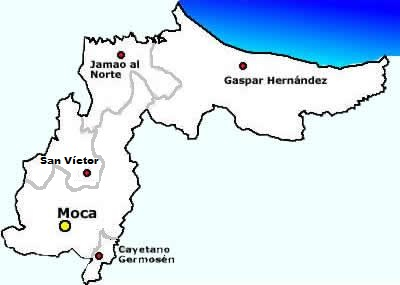
Espaillat Province

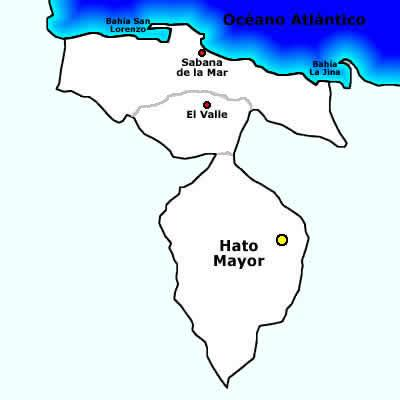
Hato Mayor Province

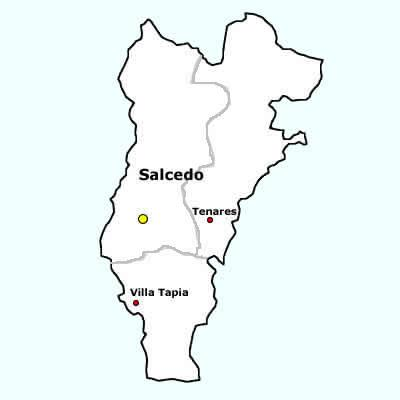
Hermanas Mirabal Province

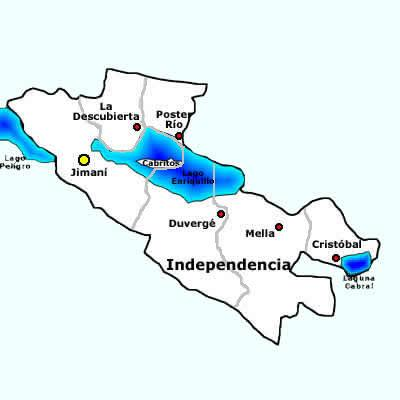
Independencia Province

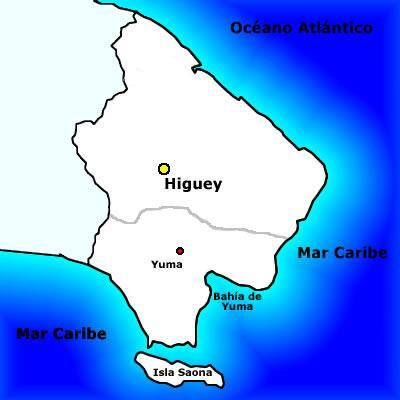
La Altagracia Province

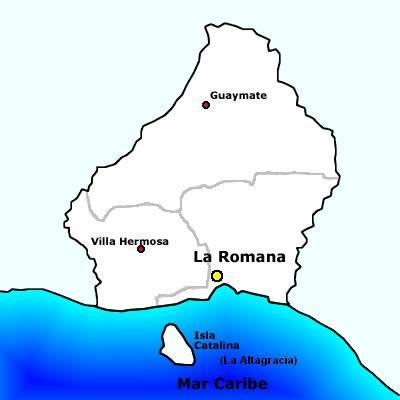
La Romana Province

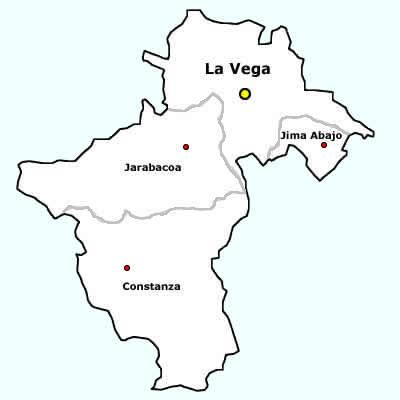
La Vega Province

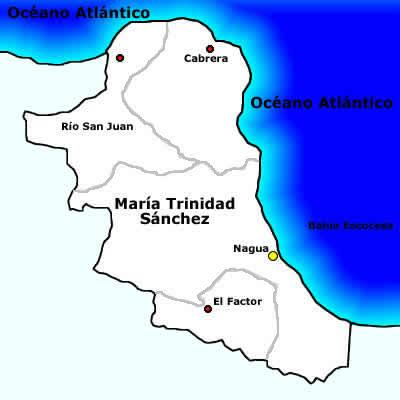
María Trinidad Sánchez Province

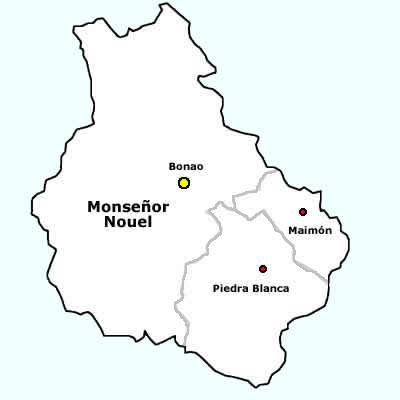
Monseñor Nouel Province

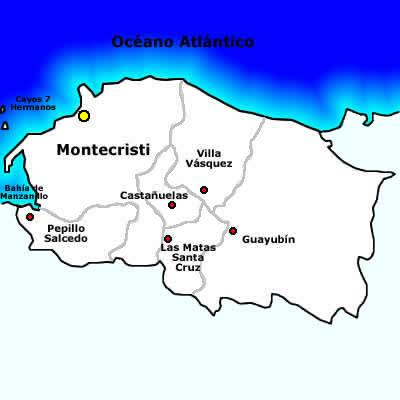
Monte Cristi Province

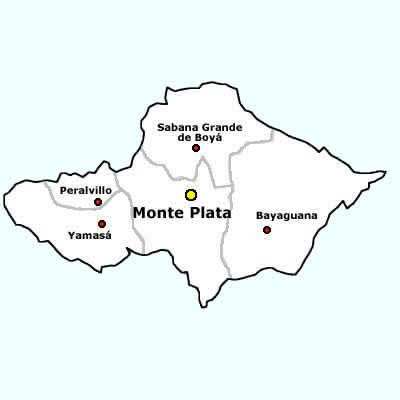
Monte Plata Province

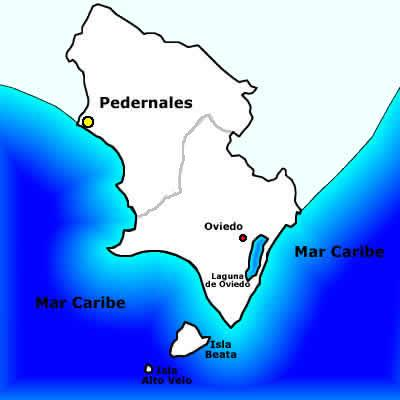
Pedernales Province

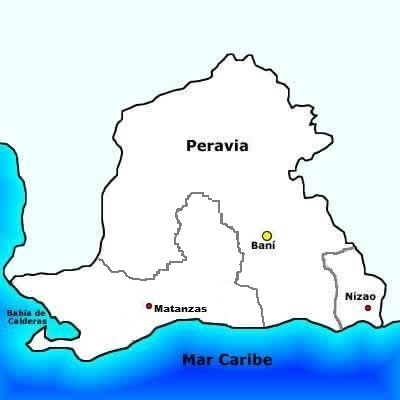
Peravia Province

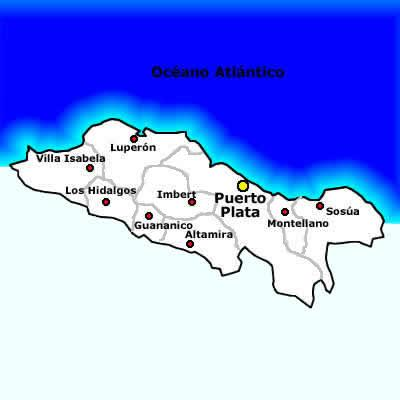
Puerto Plata Province

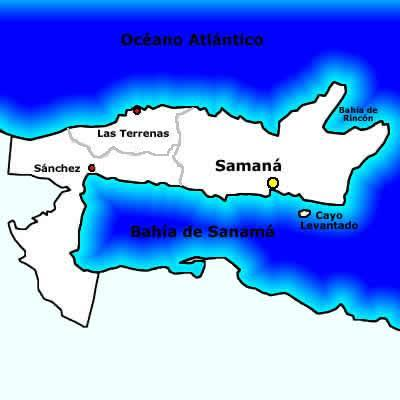
Samaná Province

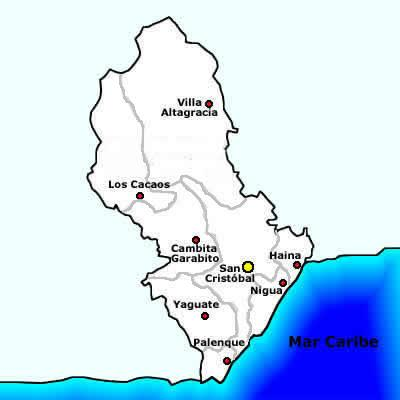
San Cristóbal Province

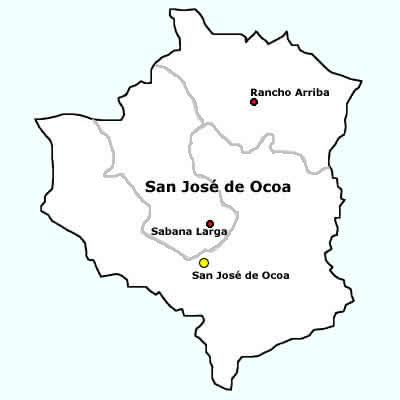
San José de Ocoa Province

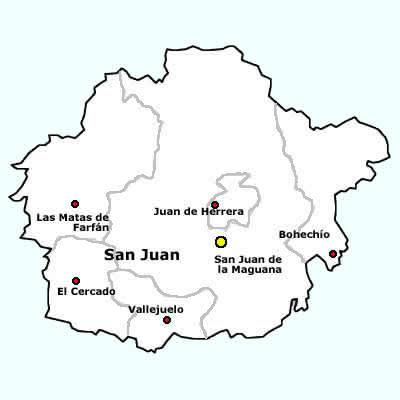
San Juan Province

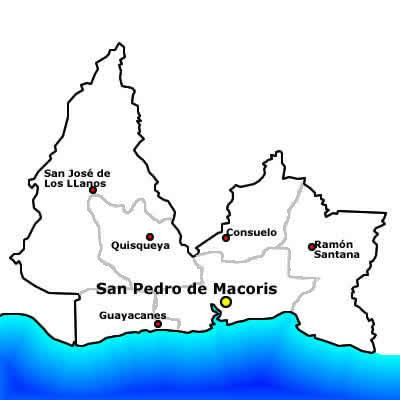
San Pedro de Macorís Province

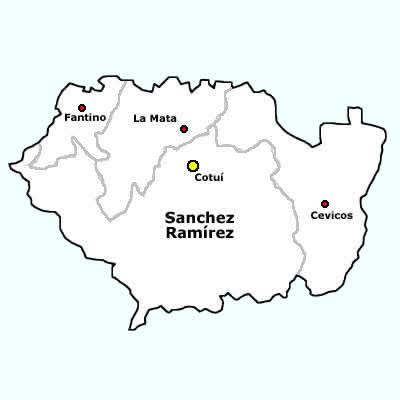
Sánchez Ramírez Province

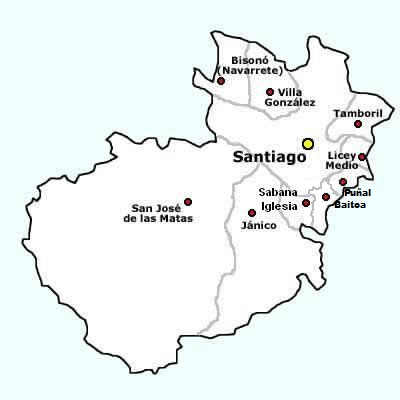
Santiago Province

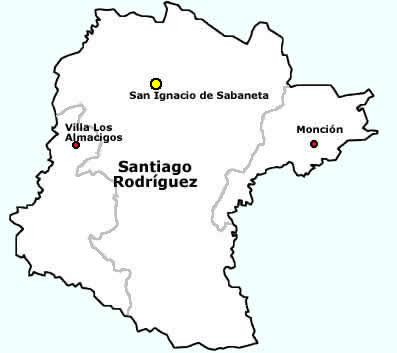
Santiago Rodríguez Province

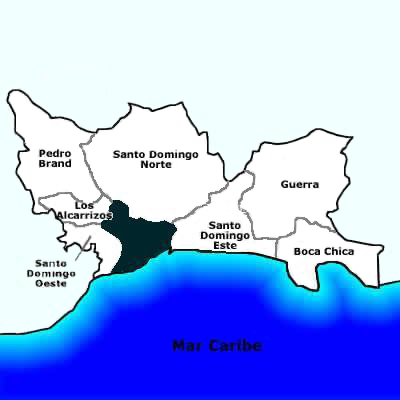
Santo Domingo Province

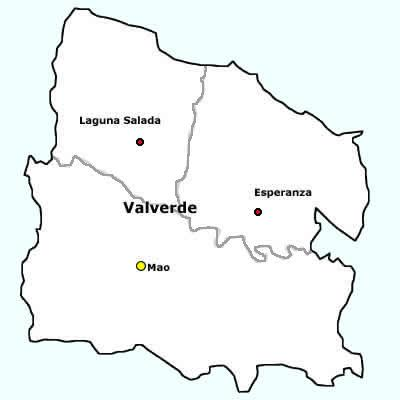
Valverde Province

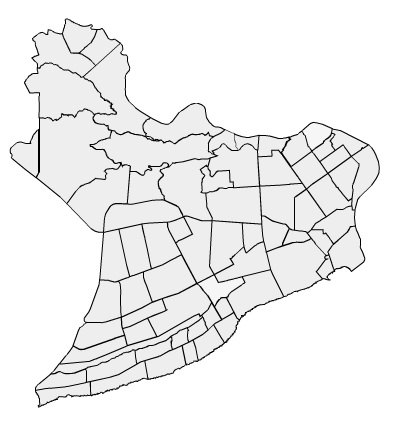
Distrito Nacional

== Bibliography ==
- Constitución de la República Dominicana. June 13, 2015. World Intellectual Property Organization (WIPO).
- Ley Nº 176-07 del Distrito Nacional y los Municipios. Congreso Nacional, July 20, 2007.

== See also ==
- List of cities in the Dominican Republic
