= Bohechío =

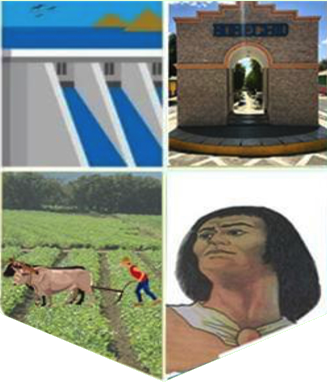
- Coat of arms

- Bohechío in the Dominican Republic
- Coordinates: 18°46′12″N 70°58′48″W
- Country: Dominican Republic
- Province: San Juan

Area
  - Total: 407.82 km^{2} (157.46 sq mi)

Population (2012)
  - Total: 9,652
  - Density: 23.67/km^{2} (61.30/sq mi)
  - Urban: 4,208
- Distance to – Santo Domingo: 205 km
- Municipal Districts: 2
- Climate: Aw

Bohechío is a town in the San Juan province of the Dominican Republic. It is located northeast of the km 25 of Azua – San Juan road at a distance of 26.5 km and 43 km from San Juan Province, 205 km from Santo Domingo and 92 km of the Province Azua, nestled between mountains at the foot of the Cordillera Central. It has a land area of 428.33 km^{2}.

== History ==
=== Bohechío the Taino Chief ===
Bohechío was one of the five head Caciques (chiefs) on the island of Hispaniola, governing the Cacicazco or Chiefdom of Jaragua in the south-western region that is now the Tiburon peninsula in modern-day Haiti.

Known for being an advocate for the progress and advancement of his people, Bohechío helped in the development and innovation of new agricultural techniques in water irrigation, also expanding on their culture and heritage.

In 1496, Bohechío assisted his brother-in-law Caonabo in the assault on the Spanish fort La Navidad in the neighboring Cacicazco (Chiefdom) of Marien. Caonabo was ultimately killed in battle, prompting Bohechío to prepare for war. When Bartolome Colon arrived in Jaragua territory, he found numerous indigenous warriors armed with bows and arrows, and clearly being outnumbered with little probabilities of survival, Bartolome Colon made the indigenous believe that he had come in peace, wanting to give praise and honor to the Cacique (chief).

Batolome and his troops arrived at the main village of Jaragua, where Bohechío had organized a celebration in honor of Colón with song and traditional dance. Upon the celebration coming to an end, Bohechío offered his personal residence to Colón that he may sleep in. There was peace throughout the next years until the chief's death, leaving his sister Anacaona to lead the Chiefdom of Jaragua as its queen.

=== Formation of the Municipality ===
Upon the beginning of the Luis Felipe Vidal revolution in 1860 - 1881, the town of Bohechío was populated during a time when people living in rural areas had no fixed place to stay, due to constant migration, raids, and looting, forcing the people to move to more remote and mountainous areas.

Among the first new arrival of settlers were the Ladies and Gentlemen, Anastasio and Manuel Piña, María Galván, Rosa Elvira de León, Marcelo Brioso, Orfelina Recio, Rafael and Secuandino Luciano, Celedonio and Alberto Luciano, Lolo Durán, and the Beltre and Adames families.

Before the formation of the municipality, the area's first settlers had named a mount in the eastern region "Cocobuí", subsequently naming the main town "Buí". It was not until July 24, 1942, when the name would be changed to "Bohechío" in honor of the Cacique.

By 1966, President of the Dominican Republic Joaquin Balaguer submits the order of Municipal District, and in 1974 was officially declared a municipality in the province of San Juan.

== Geography ==
The neighboring towns nearest to Bohechio are Padre Las Casas (6.4 km), Las Yayas de Viajama (20 km), and Guayabal (15.2 km) around where Rio Blanco and Rio Yaque del Sur meet.

Rio Yaque del Sur is a vital body of water to the southern region of the Dominican Republic, rising at a height of 2,707 meters in the Cordillera Central's southern range. The river flows 183 kilometers downstream into a river delta in Bahía de Neiba. Its waters are very shallow, only allowing the passage of small rafts, and is a desired location for the planting of sugarcane, rice, beans, peanuts, bananas, plantains and rice.

== Sources ==
- – World-Gazetteer.com
