= Sabana Yegua =

- Municipality
- Location in Dominican Republic
- Coordinates: 18°27′N 70°39′W
- Country: Dominican Republic
- Province: Azua
- Established: 2000

Area
  - Total: 101.58 km^{2} (39.22 sq mi)

Population (2012)
  - Total: 26,552
  - Density: 261.39/km^{2} (677.00/sq mi)
- Climate: Aw

Sabana Yegua is a municipality (municipio) of the Azua province in the Dominican Republic.

== Geography ==
The current location of the municipality is at the 11 kilometer mark of the Azua-San Juan highway, but it was previously located further south, next to San Juan de la Maguana, after crossing Villarpando, entering at the crossing of El Corozo.

It was transferred to the current location due to the construction of the Dam of Sabana Yegua, on the riverbed Yaque del Sur. The completed dam was filled earlier than expected, due to Hurricane David's arrival on October 31, 1979, causing the massive eviction by force of its inhabitants, which did not avoid the death of many people.

Its hydroelectric power station generates an important quantity of the country's electric energy. The irrigation ditch by-product of Sabana also contributes a volume of 8 m³ of water, which has changed the economy of Azua, with the establishment of several important agroindustrial organizations.

== Economy ==
Sabana Yegua's economy, one of the strongest in Azua, is currently based on the cultivation of plantains, bananas, tomatoes, peppers, eggplant, cilantro, onion and other agricultural products.

== See also ==
- Nuevo Sabana Yegua
