= Peralta, Azua =

Peralta
- Municipality
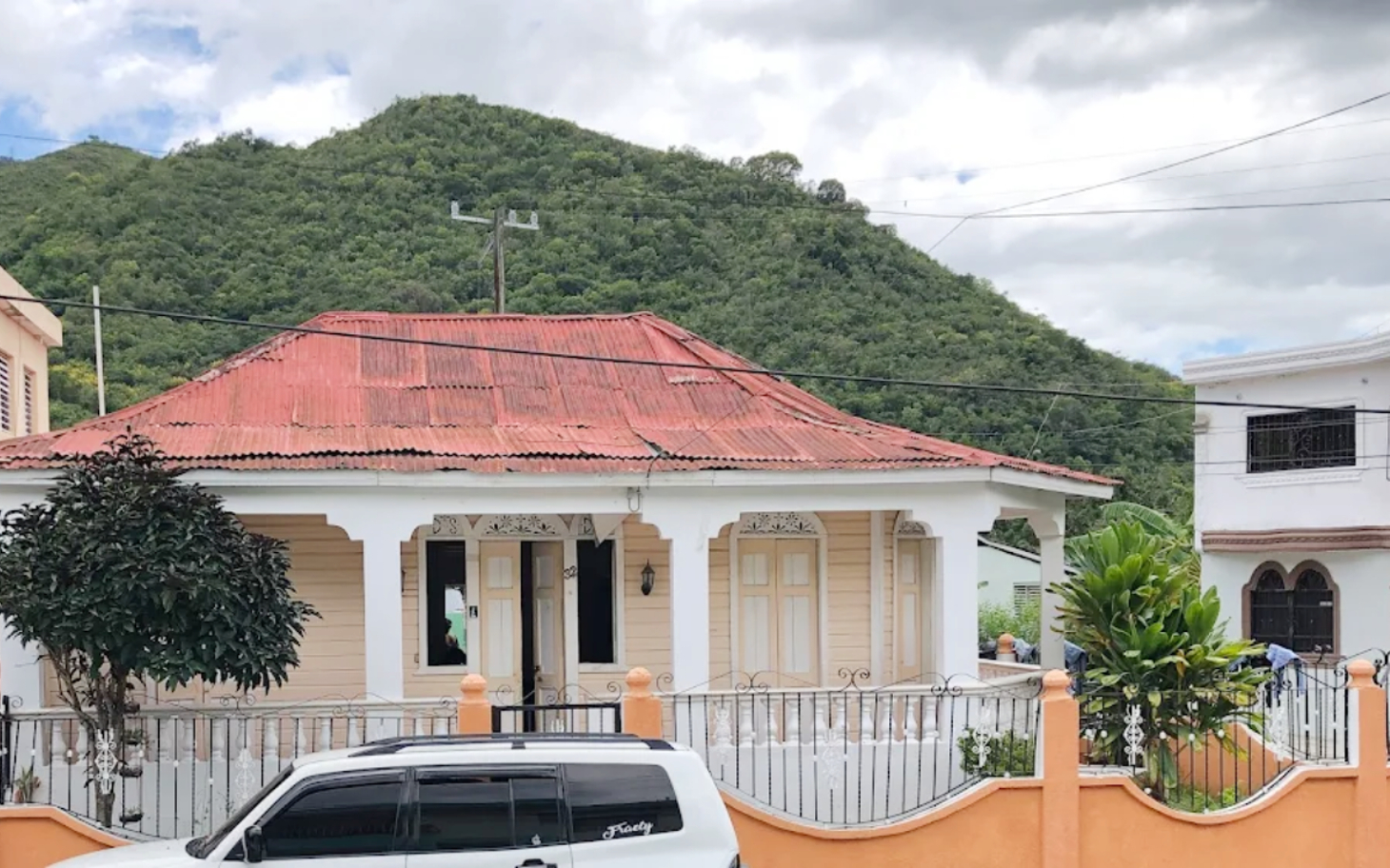
- Rural house in Azua, Peralta, Dominican Republic.

- Location within the Dominican Republic
- Coordinates: 18°31′N 70°47′W
- Country: Dominican Republic
- Province: Azua

Area
  - Total: 115.85 km^{2} (44.73 sq mi)

Population (2012)
  - Total: 8,596
  - Density: 74.20/km^{2} (192.2/sq mi)

Peralta is a municipality (municipio) of the Azua province in the Dominican Republic.

The village resides between 5,000 and 7,000 feet in the mountains. It is about a 40 to 50 minutes trip up and down the mountain to the city of Azua de Compostela. The village is primarily focused on agriculture, livestock, and fruits. Electricity is available for all inhabitants of Peralta. However, it does go out from time to time. Blackouts can range from an hour to the whole day.

There are two rivers in the village, and many of the villagers bathe in the river even though they have access to running water. There are a total of four major barrios: Los Jobos, El Higüero, El Mercado, Camboya.
