= Vicente Noble =

- Location within the Dominican Republic
- Coordinates: 18°23′N 71°11′W
- Country: Dominican Republic
- Province: Barahona

Area
  - Total: 225.63 km^{2} (87.12 sq mi)

Population (2012)
  - Total: 14,758
  - Density: 65.408/km^{2} (169.41/sq mi)

Vicente Noble is a municipality in the Barahona province in the Dominican Republic.

It is bordered on the north by the Padre Las Casas municipality, Azua Province and Vallejuelo in San Juan Province; to the east by the Azua de Compostela municipality; to the south by the Jaquimeyes section in Barahona Province; and to the west by Tamayo municipality, Neiba municipality, and the Yaque del Sur River that acts as a limit for both these municipalities.

Vicente Noble was founded by two families from Azua de Compostela. The town was given various names until it was called Vicente Noble by President Rafael Trujillo in commemoration of the actions of General Vicente Noble in battles against the Haitians.

The Vicente Noble municipality is primarily agricultural. The crops of highest productivity are plantain, banana, coconut, tomatoes, pepper, eggplant, yucca, rice, beans, maize, "guandules" and sweet potato.

Thousands of emigrants from Vicente Noble now live in Spain and the United Kingdom and do domestic work and construction, and many others practice nursing and teaching, and a few have become professional actors, runners, and footballers. Their remittance of money constitutes an important source of income for the community.
