= Tábara Arriba =

- Municipality
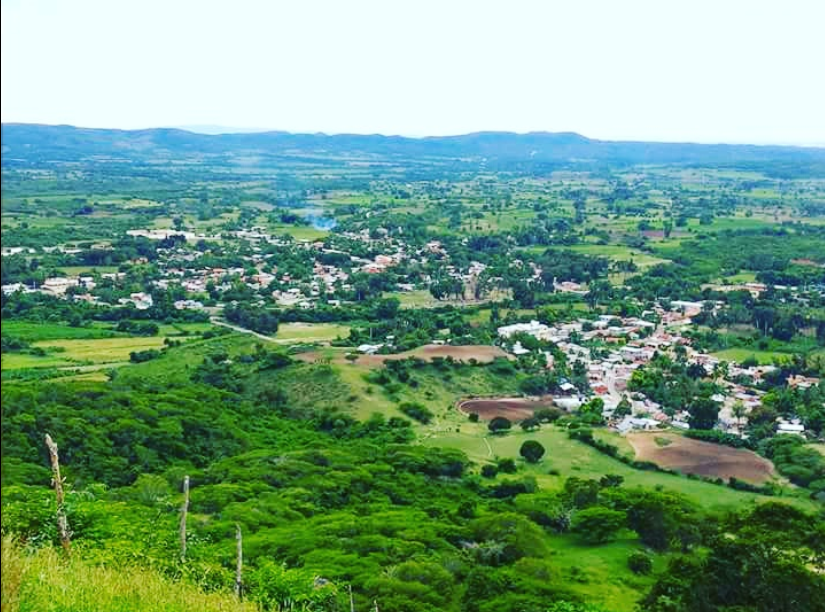
- View of Tábara Arriba

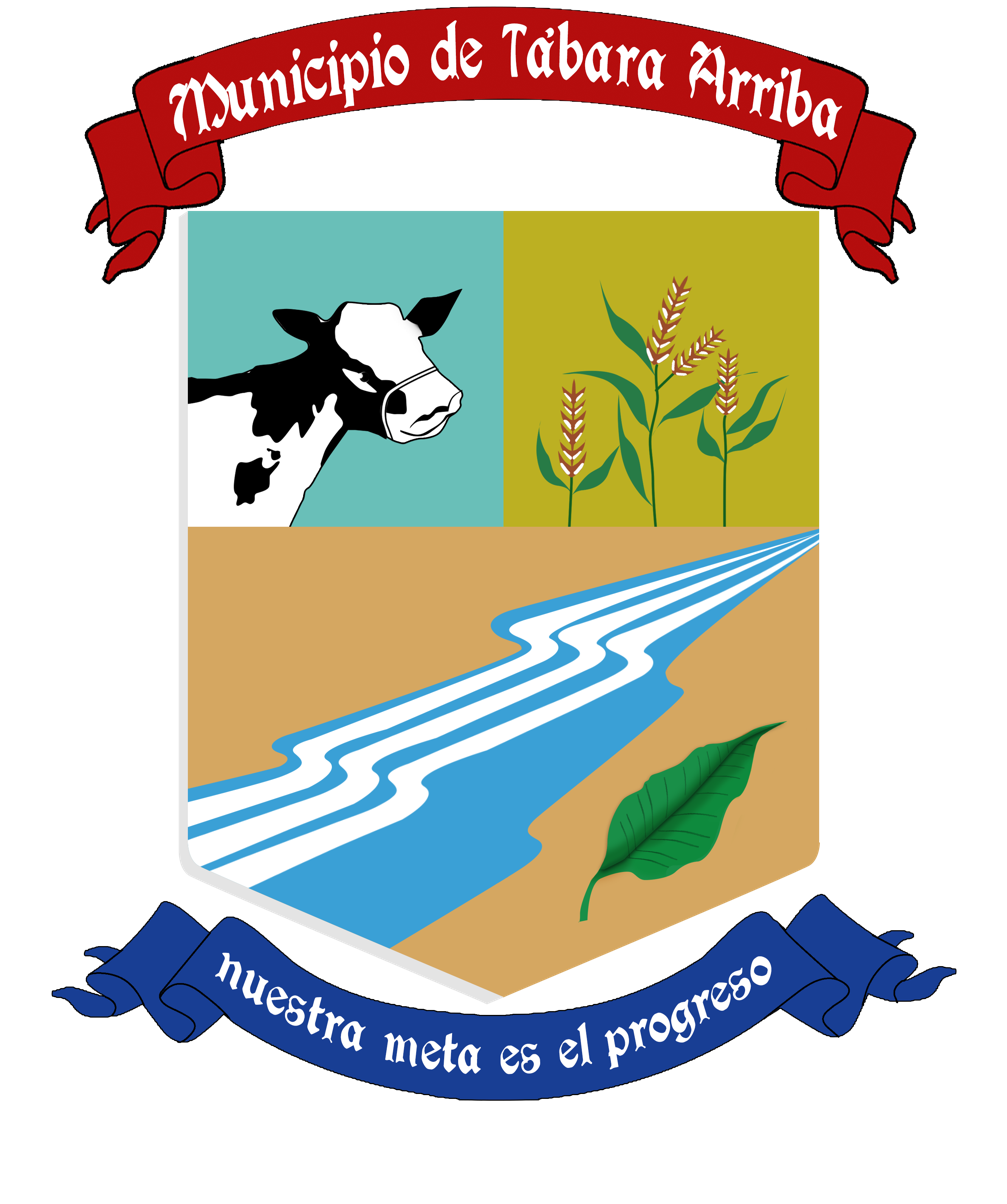
- Coat of arms

- Location within the Dominican Republic
- Coordinates: 18°34′10″N 70°52′45″W
- Country: Dominican Republic
- Province: Azua

Area
  - Total: 209.84 km^{2} (81.02 sq mi)

Population (2012)
  - Total: 14,258
  - Density: 67.947/km^{2} (175.98/sq mi)

Tábara Arriba is a municipality (municipio) of the Azua province in the Dominican Republic. It became a municipal district in 1978, and was further declared a municipality in 2004.

The municipality has a total population of 12,475, with 3,709 inhabitants (29.7 percent) in the urban area and 8,766 inhabitants (70.3 percent) in the rural area, according to the eighth national census of population and housing 2002. It is located about 28 km from Azua, the capital of the province.

It has a mainly agricultural production, being the main items coffee, snuff and pigeon peas. Also, although to a lesser extent, there is some livestock vaccine development.

Today is taking the phenomenon of mass emigration of its inhabitants to Spain, which has contributed to the development of the municipality through remittances sent from those Dominicans abroad.

== Political division ==
It consists of five communities with their landscapes:

- Municipality Tabara Arriba (Header Community)
- The Municipal Districts Los Toros, Amiama Gómez, Tabara Abajo
- Sections The Guanábanas and Sajanoa, Monte Grande, Los Guiros, and Los Manatiales
- The Sites of Arroyo Guayabo Sajanoa, Ants Los Toros, km15, La guajira and Monte Grande.

== Culture and folklore ==
In such populations, they have a unique role mayors responsible for ensuring order and tranquility. The first mayor took the name of Leon Brito.

Among the cultural manifestations of the people highlights the annual celebration of the festivities, with the pattern San Miguel Arcangel. It is held between 21 and September 30 of each year and a young woman is chosen as queen.

The first festivities were organized in 1958 by Emilio Jose Caminero and Mercedes Ramirez, the first queen Miss Teresa Carrasco.

It is customary during the holidays also sports exchanges made between members of the community. The drums are popular clubs or parties, sailing days and nights sailing. These consist of cults sacrifice to the saints in which bats are nothing but drums and chants or salves accompanied by a guiro and maracas are sung.

== Education ==
The first teacher who taught was teaching in Tabara Arriba Chiquito Ortiz who moved from Azua.

Tabara has two schools:

- Liceo Roque Feliz whose construction was between 94 and 95 teaching starting in March 1995 with an enrollment of 68 students five teachers and a director. This school is equipped with modern computer center.
- Elementary School Tabara Arriba built in 1972, where teaching is taught from the first to the eighth grade in evening and morning runs.

Tabara Arriba also has a development council and 37 legal promoters. Besides literacy programs, radio schools and training program in the faith Together we learn more . also it has two library s, a park, two churches, a town hall and a police station.

== Transportation ==
The most commonly used today is the Motoconcho, followed by passenger minibuses covering Azua Tábara-route and load trucks for transportation of agricultural products to Santo Domingo and other provinces.
