= Yegua (disambiguation) =

Yegua is another name for thehe yagua

Yegua or yeguas may also refer to:

== Places ==
- Mare Island (Spanish: Isla de la Yegua), island in California, US
- Nuevo Sabana Yegua, town in the Dominican Republic
- Punta Yeguas, nature reserve in Puerto Rico, US
- Quebrada Yeguas, barrio in Puerto Rico, US
- Sabana Yegua, municipality in the Dominican Republic
- Sabana Yeguas, barrio in Puerto Rico, US
- Villar de la Yegua, municipality in Spain
- Yegua Creek, Texas, US
- Yegua Formation, Texas, US
- Yeguas Reservoir, reservoir in Spain
- Yegua, Texas, Texas, US; named for Yegua Creek

== See also ==
- Yagua (disambiguation)
