= Guayabal, Azua =

Guayabal
- Municipality
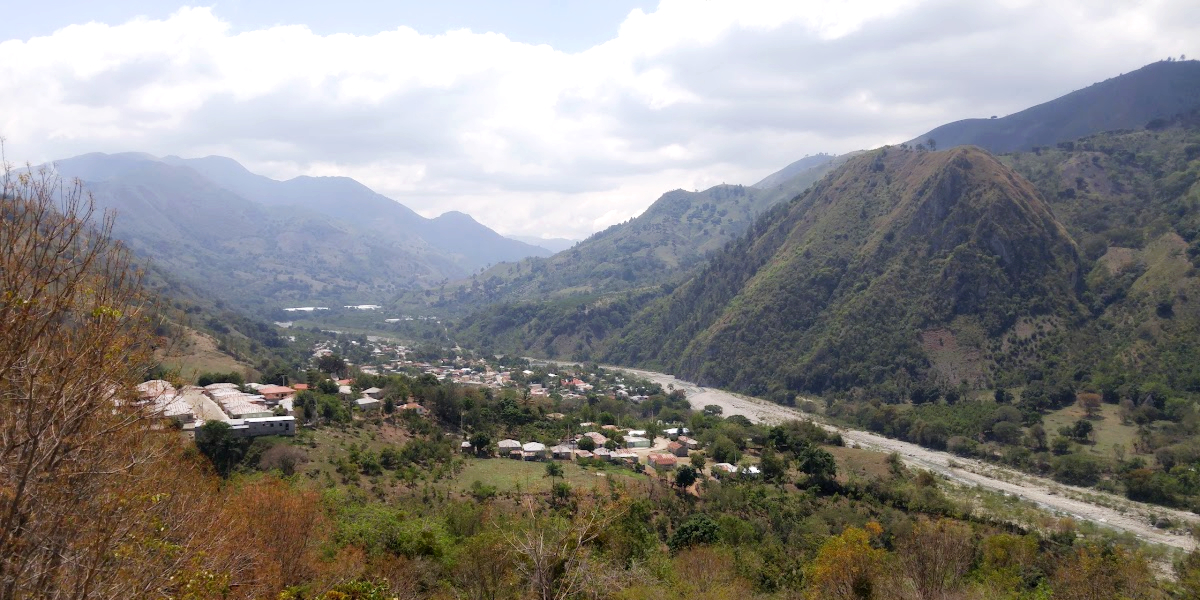
- Aerial view of Guayabal

- Location within the Dominican Republic
- Coordinates: 18°44′58″N 70°50′15″W
- Country: Dominican Republic
- Province: Azua

Area
  - Municipality: 262.87 km^{2} (101.49 sq mi)

Population (2012)
  - Municipality: 3,965
  - Density: 15.08/km^{2} (39.07/sq mi)
  - Urban: 1,047
  - Rural: 2,918

Guayabal is a municipality (municipio) of the Azua province in the Dominican Republic.

== Location ==
Guayabal lies 725 meters above sea level at the confluence of the Arroyo Guayabal in the Rio Cueva. The coordinates are 18°44'56 N 70°50'11 W (from Google Earth). A trail goes through the Arroyo Guayabal to Constanza. Constanza is about a two-hour drive, yet the roads require the use of sports utility vehicles. Guayabal is about 20 km (50 minutes if using the public minibus, Guagua) north-east of Padre las Casas, and about another 2 hours, in the Guagua, away from the province capital Azua de Compostela.

== Society ==
Guayabal administrates some smaller villages alongside the Rio Cueva. These villages are accessible solely with offroad capable vehicles. Some include: Periquito (20 min. west), Arroyo Corozo (15 min. east), La Guama (30 min. south-east) and El Recodo (2 hr.'s south-east). Being that Guayabal is difficult to access its residents are very dependent on Padre las Casas for many goods and services.

There is much poverty and as such there is a lot of emigration in search of work. Yet, during Christmas, Navidad, or Easter, Semana Santa, the town is repopulated.

== Economy ==
The economy is dominated by the cultivation of beans (habichuelas), peas (guandule), cassava (yuca)and calabash (auyama). The meat and dairy industries, once successful, have given way to agriculture due to the high availability of arable land versus the limited availability of land suited for raising livestock. The production region, called Loma or Cerca, covers all the hillsides up to the top of the highest mountains, some of which are over a kilometer above sea level. The cost of an acre of land is about $4000RD or about US$100. The most common mode of transport is on horseback.

== Tourism ==
There is little tourism; Guayabal has two small hotels. One has the usual amenities of a hotel, it includes a bath, a TV and a ventilator, but these rooms serve mostly reserved by business travelers. There is one restaurant in the town. The tourists that do come to Guayabal or, Padre Las Casas, are usually on their way to the city of Constanza.
