= Palmar de Ocoa =

- Location within the Dominican Republic
- Coordinates: 18°18′0″N 70°34′48″W
- Country: Dominican Republic
- Province: Azua, Azua

Population (2008)
  - Total: 2,061

Palmar de Ocoa is a town in the Azua de Compostela province of the Dominican Republic.

== Sources ==
- – World-Gazetteer.com
