= Estebanía =

- Location in Dominican Republic
- Coordinates: 18°27′N 70°39′W
- Country: Dominican Republic
- Province: Azua
- Municipality: 2001

Area
  - City: 159.20 km^{2} (61.47 sq mi)

Population (2012)
  - City: 10,154
  - Density: 63.781/km^{2} (165.19/sq mi)
  - Urban: 4,189
- Climate: Aw

Estebanía is a small town about a 10-minute drive from the city of Azua de Compostela in the Azua Province of the Dominican Republic. The town is close to another municipality named Las Charcas. The municipality covers an area of 187.27 km^{2} (72.31 sq mi).

As with most other Dominican towns, baseball is a major pastime in Estebanía. Local children play the sport at the town's baseball field, whether by themselves or with a team.

== History ==
Estebanía was made a municipal district of Azua de Compostela in 1997 and then it was elevated to the category of municipality of the Azua province in 2001.

== Economy ==
The main economic activity of the municipality is agriculture. The town is growing economically due to the support of Dominican emigrants living in the United States. Most of the emigrants live in New York City, particularly Washington Heights, the Bronx, Queens, and the suburbs of New Jersey and Long Island. However, many others live in Miami, Boston and other parts of the Northeastern United States.

Men in the town are typically farmers, while women are almost strictly housewives. However, women from poorer families work outside the house, either selling fresh produce or as maids in the homes of others.
