= Pueblo Viejo, Dominican Republic =

Pueblo Viejo
- Municipality
- Location within the Dominican Republic
- Coordinates: 18°24′N 70°46′W
- Country: Dominican Republic
- Province: Azua

Area
  - Total: 45.38 km^{2} (17.52 sq mi)

Population (2012)
  - Total: 8,251
  - Density: 181.8/km^{2} (470.9/sq mi)

Pueblo Viejo is a municipality (municipio) of the Azua province in the Dominican Republic.

== History ==
The town that is now known as Pueblo Viejo was the place where in 1504 Diego Velázquez de Cuéllar, the conqueror of Cuba, founded the colonial town of Azua de Compostela. It was named in honour of one of the first Spanish settlers in the area, Don Pedro Gallego, a native of Santiago de Compostela, in Galicia, Spain. The first part of the name is derived from the local Native American name for the area. The old colonial city was destroyed by an earthquake on October the 16th 1751. The settlers of the area moved further North, near the River Road, and established a new town in that area.
