= Guayabal =

Guayabal may refer to places:

- Guayabal, Azua, a town in the Dominican Republic
- Guayabal, Independencia, a town in the Dominican Republic
- Guayabal, Panama, a subdivision of Boquerón District
- Guayabal (Medellín), a district of Medellín, Colombia
- Guayabal de Síquima, a town in Cundinamarca Department, Colombia
- Armero, also known as Armero-Guayabal, a municipality in Tolima Department, Colombia
- San José Guayabal, a municipality in El Salvador
