= Víctor Batista =

Dominican Republic volleyball player

Victor Batista
Personal information
- Full name: Victor Arístides Batista Lemos
- Nationality: Dominican Republic
- Born: October 1, 1979 (age 47) Tamayo
- Home town: Santo Domingo
- Height: 1.98 m (6 ft 6 in)
- Weight: 88 kg (194 lb)
- Spike: 358 cm (141 in)
- Block: 345 cm (136 in)

Volleyball information
- Position: Wing Spiker
- Current club: (United States) Retired
- Number: 15

National team
- Years: Team
- 1998 -: Dominican Republic
Honours
Men's volleyball
Representing the Dominican Republic
Pan American Cup
| Bronze medal – third place | 2008 Winnipeg | Team |
| Bronze medal – third place | 2009 Chiapas | Team |
- Updated on May 2011

Víctor Arístides Batista Lemos (born October 2, 1979, in Tamayo) is a male volleyball player from the Dominican Republic, who won the bronze medal with the men's national team at the 2008 Pan American Cup in Winnipeg, Manitoba. He play as wing spiker.

== Career ==
Playing with Bameso, he won two times the 2004 and 2005 USA Open Volleyball Championship, being awarded MVP and All-Tournament both times.

Víctor studied in Brigham Young University, majoring in Leisure Services Management. With the BYU Cougar's he won the 2004 NCAA National Collegiate Championship playing as a middle blocker, and winning the 2003-2004 VCA All-America Second Team, 2004-2005 All-MPSF Second Team and Asics/Volleyball Magazine and All-American Second Team, and finally 2005-2006 All-MPSF Honorable Mention; finishing with a .378 career hitting percentage, fourth in BYU history.

Played with Puerto Rican team Patriotas de Lares for the 2007 season. Next year joined the Turkish team Tokat Plevne Belediye. Later same season, joined the A2 Italian team Samgas Crema to play the 2008/2009 season.

Returned to Puerto Rican LVSM with Indios de Mayagüez for the 2008 season, and Los Caribes de San Sebastian for the 2009/2010 season.

Joined for the 2009/2010 the Spanish team CAI Voleibol Teruel, the 2010 Spanish Superliga. The next year, Batista played with his friend and countrymate José Miguel Cáceres. Víctor win MVP awards for his performances during the regular season and the playoffs. And won the 2011 King's Cup and the Superliga.

== Clubs ==
- (Dominican Republic) Bameso (1998–2005)
- (Puerto Rico) Patriotas de Lares (2007)
- (Turkey) Tokat Plevne Belediye (2007–2008)
- (Puerto Rico) Indios de Mayagüez (2008)
- (Italy) Samgas Crema (2008–2009)
- (Puerto Rico) Caribes de San Sebastián (2009)
- (Spain) CAI Voleibol Teruel (2009–2011)
- (France) GFCO Ajaccio (2011-2012)
- (Germany) VfB Friedrichshafen (2012-2013)
- (Israel) Maccabi Tel Aviv (2013-2014)

== Awards ==
=== Individuals ===
- 2004 USA Open Volleyball Championship "Most Valuable Player"
- 2005 USA Open Volleyball Championship "Most Valuable Player"
- 2011 Spanish Superliga Final Series "Most Valuable Player"

=== College ===
- 2004 AVCA All-America Second Team
- 2005 All-MPSF Second Team
- 2005 Asics/Volleyball Magazine All-American Second Team
- 2006 All-MPSF Honorable Mention

=== Clubs ===
- 2004 USA Open Volleyball Championship - Champion, with Bameso
- 2005 USA Open Volleyball Championship - Champion, with Bameso
- 2010 Spanish Superliga - Champion, with CAI Voleibol Teruel
- 2011 Spanish King's Cup - Champion, with CAI Voleibol Teruel
- 2011 Spanish Superliga - Champion, with CAI Voleibol Teruel
