= Independencia Province =

Province of the Dominican Republic

Independencia
- Province
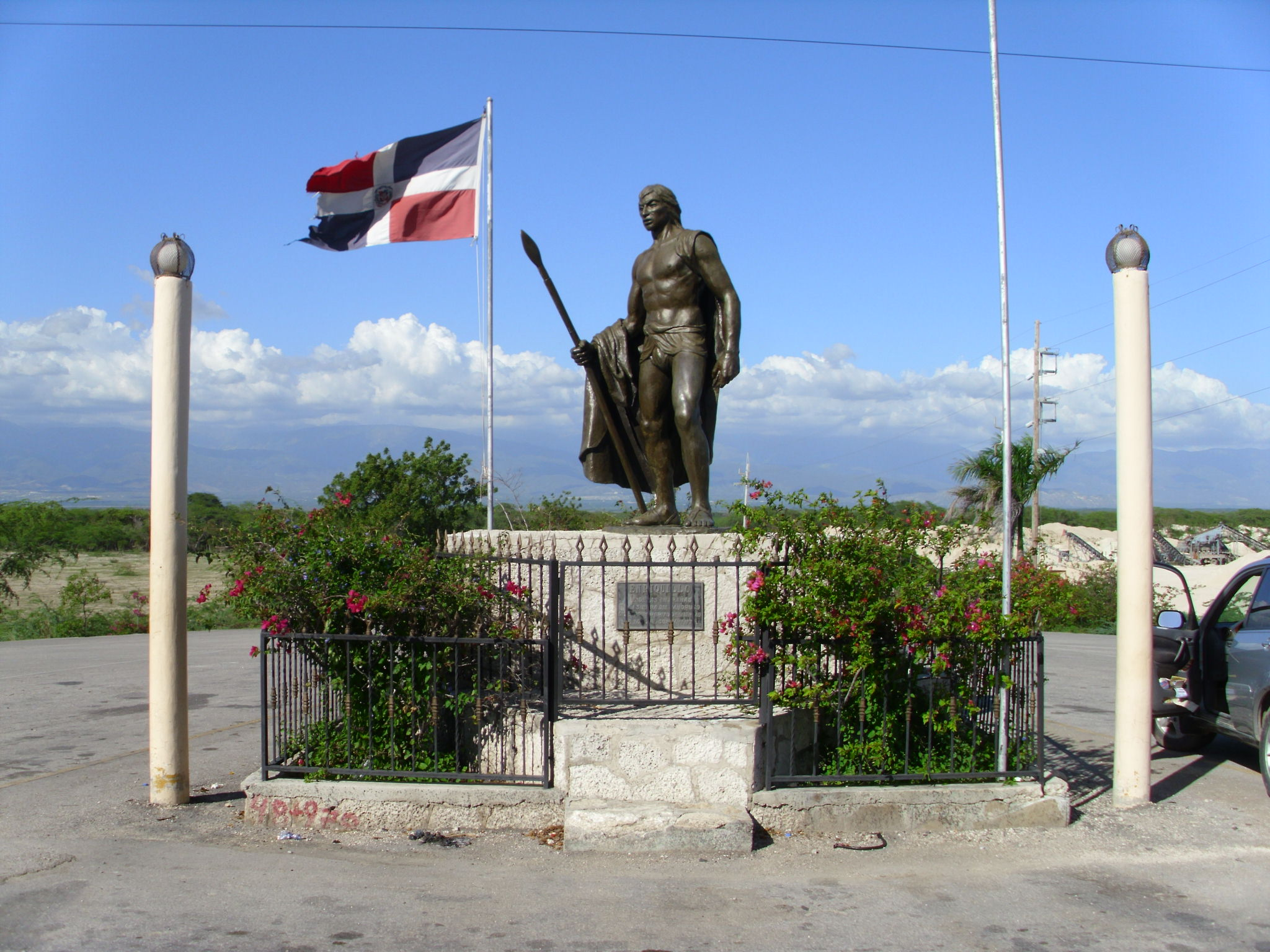
- Statue of the Taino Enriquillo

- Location of Independencia Province
- Country: Dominican Republic
- Province since: 1948
- Capital: Jimaní

Government
  - Type: Subdivisions
  - Body: 6 municipalities 6 municipal districts
  - Congresspersons: 1 Senator; 2 Deputies

Area
  - Total: 2,007.4 km^{2} (775.1 sq mi)

Population (2022)
  - Total: 60,689
  - Density: 30.233/km^{2} (78.302/sq mi)
- Demonym: Independenciano/a
- Time zone: UTC-4 (EST)
- Area code: 1-809 1-829 1-849
- ISO 3166-2: DO-10
- Postal Code: 83000

Independencia (Spanish pronunciation: [indepenˈdensja]) is a province of the Dominican Republic. It is spread over an area of 2,007.4 km^{2} (775.1 sq mi), and has its capital at Jimaní. It was created on 29 December 1948, but officially came into effect on 1 January 1950. As per the 2022 census, it had a population of 60,689 inhabitants.

== History ==
The region was earlier part of the Bahoruco Province. It was created on 29 December 1948, but officially came into effect on 1 January 1950. The name is given in remembrance of the National Independence of 27 February 1844.

== Geography ==
Independencia is one of the 31 provinces of the Dominican Republic. It is spread over an area of 2,007.4 km^{2} (775.1 sq mi). It is located in the southwestern part of the country, and is bordered by the Elías Piña Province to the north, Bahoruco and Barahona Provinces to the east, Pedernales Province to the south. It shares an international land border with Haiti to the west.

=== Climate and vegetation ===
The climate is warm and predominantly dry. The province has a tropical savanna climate (Köppen climate classification: Aw). It has an average annual temperature is 26.59 °C (79.86 °F), and receives an average annual rainfall of 4.25 cm (1.67 in) annually.

About 897.54 km^{2} (346.54 sq mi) of the total land area is protected, which forms part of several National Parks. Forests cover 798.8 km^{2} (308.4 sq mi) or 40.4% of the total land area of which dry forests occupy the majority of the area, with patches of conifer and broad-leaf forests. Agricultural lands cover 473.3 km^{2} (182.7 sq mi) of the land area of the province.

=== Administration ===
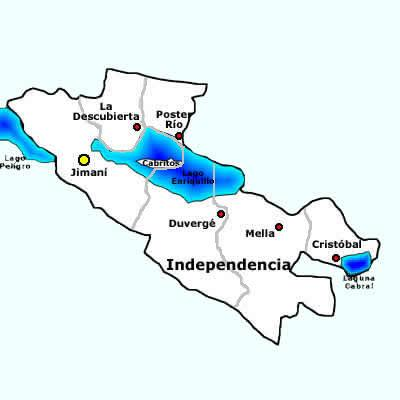
Municipalities of Independencia

Its capital city is Jimaní. The province is divided into six municipalities (municipios), which are further subdivided into seven municipal districts.

- Cristóbal
  - Batey 8 (D.M.)
- Duvergé
  - Vengan a Ver (D.M.)
  - Puerto Escondido (D.M.)
- Jimaní
  - Boca de Cachón (D.M.)
  - El Limón (D.M.)
- La Descubierta
- Mella
  - La Colonia (D.M.)
- Postrer Río
  - Guayabal (D.M.)

== Demographics ==
According to the 2022 census, the province had a population of 60,689 inhabitants. The population consisted of 30,672 males (50.5%) and 30,017 females (49.5%). About 30.7% of the population was below the age of 15 years, 60.7% belonged to the age group of 15–64 years, and 8.6% was aged 65 years or older. The province had an urban population of 48,048 inhabitants (79.2%) and a rural population of 12,641 inhabitants (20.8%).
