= Jamao al Norte =

- Location within the Dominican Republic
- Coordinates: 19°39′0″N 70°37′0″W
- Country: Dominican Republic
- Province: Espaillat
- Municipality since: 2001

Area
  - Total: 115.48 km^{2} (44.59 sq mi)

Population (2012)
  - Total: 42,953
  - Density: 371.95/km^{2} (963.35/sq mi)
  - Urban: 15,390
- Municipalities: 0

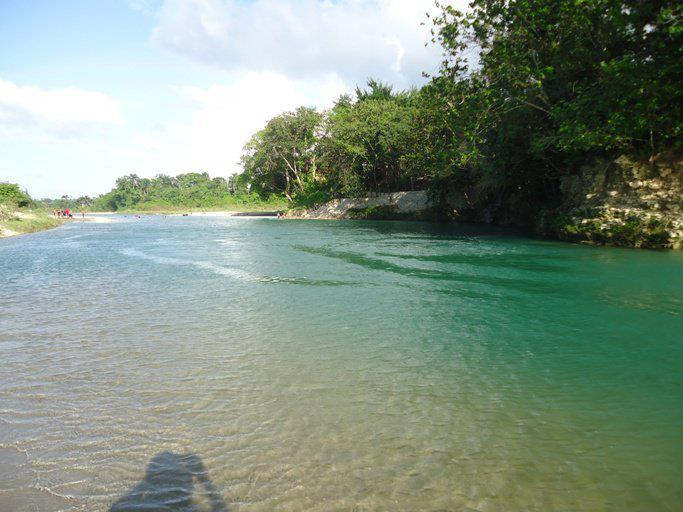
River in Jamao al Norte, Espaillat

Jamao al Norte is a town in the Espaillat province of the Dominican Republic.

== Sources ==
- – World-Gazetteer.com
