= Padre Las Casas =

Padre Las Casas may refer to:

- Padre Las Casas, Chile
- Padre Las Casas, Dominican Republic
