= Cayetano Germosén =

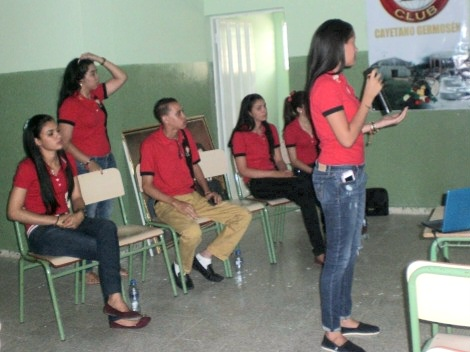
- Dominican Republic students in Cayetano Germosen

- Location within the Dominican Republic
- Coordinates: 19°19′48″N 70°28′48″W
- Country: Dominican Republic
- Province: Espaillat
- Municipality since: 1987

Area
  - Total: 17.75 km^{2} (6.85 sq mi)

Population (2012)
  - Total: 36,930
  - Density: 2,081/km^{2} (5,389/sq mi)
  - Urban: 16,439
- Municipalities: 0

Cayetano Germosén is a town in the Espaillat province of the Dominican Republic. It is also known as Guanabano. It is known for its rich and fertile soil.
