= Mella, Independencia =

Mella
- Location within the Dominican Republic
- Coordinates: 18°20′0″N 71°26′48″W
- Country: Dominican Republic
- Province: Independencia

Area
  - Total: 508.81 km^{2} (196.45 sq mi)

Population (2012)
  - Total: 3,008
  - Density: 5.912/km^{2} (15.31/sq mi)
- Website: BSh

Mella is a town in the Independencia province of the Dominican Republic.

Its estimated population in 2012 was 3,008.

== Sources ==
- World Gazeteer: Dominican Republic – World-Gazetteer.com
