= Postrer Río =

- Location within the Dominican Republic
- Coordinates: 18°33′0″N 71°37′48″W
- Country: Dominican Republic
- Province: Independencia

Area
  - Total: 158.93 km^{2} (61.36 sq mi)

Population (2012)
  - Total: 5,289
  - Density: 33.28/km^{2} (86.19/sq mi)
- Climate: Aw

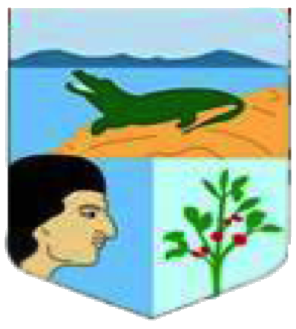
Coat of arms of Postrer Río

Postrer Río is a town in the Independencia province of the Dominican Republic.

== Sources ==
- – World-Gazetteer.com
