= Villarpando =

- Location within the Dominican Republic
- Coordinates: 18°39′00″N 71°01′48″W
- Country: Dominican Republic
- Province: Azua

Population (2008)
  - Total: 3,113

Villarpando is a town in the Azua province of the Dominican Republic.

== Sources ==
- – World-Gazetteer.com
