= Guayabal, Independencia =

Guayabal
- Location within the Dominican Republic
- Coordinates: 18°36′0″N 71°39′0″W
- Country: Dominican Republic
- Province: Independencia

Population (2008)
  - Total: 1,660

Guayabal is a town in the Independencia province of the Dominican Republic.

== Sources ==
- – World-Gazetteer.com
