= Edna Garrido Ramírez =

Dominican educator, researcher and folklorist

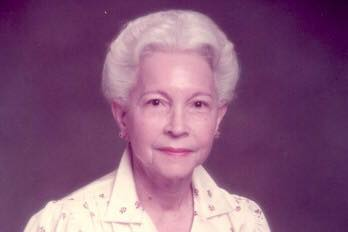
- Ramírez in 2007
- Born: Edna Garrido Ramírez; June 19, 1913; Azua de Compostela, Dominican Republic
- Died: April 11, 2010 (aged 96); Virginia Beach, Virginia, United States
- Other names: Edna Garrido de Boggs
- Occupations: Educator, Folklorist, and Researcher
- Title: Teacher; Professor; Researcher
- Spouse: Ralph S. Boggs (m. 1949)
- Parents: Víctor Garrido Puello; Tijides Ramírez Lasala

Edna Garrido Ramírez (19 June 1913 – 11 April 2010), also known as Edna Garrido de Boggs, was a Dominican educator, researcher and folklorist. She is considered a pioneer in the studies of Dominican folklore, for her field research on dances, sayings, riddles, oral tales, popular songs, children's games and other manifestations of folklore and ethnomusicology. She founded the first Dominican Folklore Society in 1946 in Santo Domingo.

== Early life ==
Garrido was born in 1913 in Azua de Compostela, into a family of writers, growing up for most of her childhood in San Juan de la Maguana. She was the daughter of writer, journalist, and historian Víctor Garrido Puello, and Tijides Ramírez Lasala, the daughter of General Wenceslao Ramírez.

She completed her basic studies in a local school in San Juan de la Maguana. After ten years, she moved with her family to the capital, Santo Domingo. She graduated as a teacher in 1934 from the Instituto de Señoritas Salomé Ureña and worked as a teacher from 1934 to 1946. Garrido was also a close friend of Hilma Contreras, the 2002 National Literature Prize winner. Following the suggestion of a colleague, she attended a Folklore course in 1944 by the American professor Ralph Boggs at the Autonomous University of Santo Domingo (UASD). This introductions course began a life-long dedication to folkloric studies. Her travels around the country led her to research the south's baile de palo and La Cofradía del Espíritu Santo; to the Cibao region where she recorded songs of popular folk musician, Ñico Lora; and to the eastern region of the country, where she collected versions of the legend of La Ciguapa. Eventually, Garrido went to study on a scholarship at the University of North Carolina, in the United States. Upon her return to the country, she founded the first Dominican Folkloric Society and ran the first specialized editions of the Dominican Folkloric Bulletin.

On June 24, 1948, she married Dr. Ralph Boggs, later moving to Miami, United States. From there she continued her work of research, dissemination and promotion of folklore. In 1981, she taught a Folklore Course with her husband at the Museum of the Dominican Man, in Santo Domingo.

== Career ==
For many years, she spread her investigations of Dominican folklore through monographs, conferences and press articles. In 1952, she won first prize in the folklore section of a literary contest in Santo Domingo. She founded the first Folklore Society in Santo Domingo in 1947, establishing the Bulletin of Dominican folklore, which ran from 1947 to 1948. In 1969, the government of the Dominican Republic granted Garrido the Heraldic Order of Juan Pablo Duarte, in the degree of Commander, for her work in ethnomusicology.

She retained memories as far back as 1918 when her parents moved from one house to another in Azua. She narrated the end of World War I and the smallpox epidemic that soon followed. She died on April 11, 2010, at age 96 in Virginia Beach, Virginia.

== Work ==
Her work is published in articles, bulletins, books, conferences, and dissertations, and is a mandatory reference for anthropologists, sociologists, and academics who want to know about Dominican folklore.

=== Books ===
- Versiones Dominicanas de Romances Españoles (English: "Dominican Versions of Spanish Romances"), published in Santo Domingo in 1946.
- Folklore Infantil de Santo Domingo, (English: "Childish Folklore of Santo Domingo"), published in Madridin 1956.
- Panorama del Folklore Dominicano, (English: "Panorama of Dominican Folklore"), published in 1961.
- Reseña Histórica del Folklore Dominicano, (English: "Historical Review of Folklore"), published in 2006.
- Perlas de la pluma de los Garrido, Santo Domingo 2003.

== Articles ==
- «Las Lomas Dos Hermanos», Boletín del Folklore Dominicano, 1947, I, no. 1.
- «El aguinaldo», Boletín del Folklore Dominicano, 1948, II, no., I.
- In collaboration with R.S. Boggs, «Unas categorías de adivinanzas ilustradas con ejemplos dominicanos, homenaje Luis de Hoyos Sainz», Madrid 1949, I; and «Supervivencias de Refranes Españoles en Santo Domingo», Folklore Americano, XV/XVI, no. 15.
- «El Dominicano visto a Través de sus Juegos», EME, 1975, III, no. 17.
- «Lo Folklórico y lo Popular», Revista Actualidad, August 16, 1947, IV.
