= Cristóbal, Dominican Republic =

Cristóbal
- Location within the Dominican Republic
- Coordinates: 18°26′0″N 71°23′48″W
- Country: Dominican Republic
- Province: Independencia

Area
  - Total: 151.72 km^{2} (58.58 sq mi)

Population (2012)
  - Total: 5,908
  - Density: 38.94/km^{2} (100.9/sq mi)

Cristóbal is a town in the Independencia province of the Dominican Republic.

== Sources ==
- World Gazetteer: Dominican Republic – World-Gazetteer.com
