= Tamayo, Dominican Republic =

Tamayo
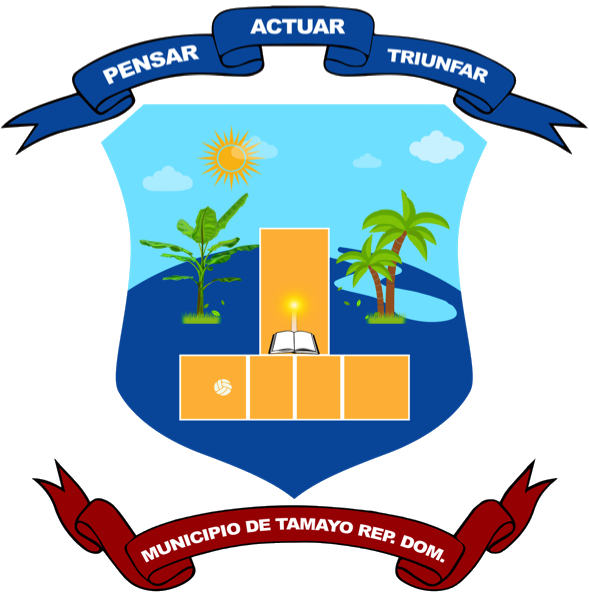
- Coat of arms

- Location in the Dominican Republic
- Coordinates: 18°24′N 71°12′W
- Country: Dominican Republic
- Province: Baoruco
- Municipality: 1943

Area
  - City: 455.85 km^{2} (176.00 sq mi)
- Elevation: 10 m (33 ft)

Population (2002)
  - City: 23,294
  - Density: 51.100/km^{2} (132.35/sq mi)
  - Urban: 8,812
  - Demonym: Tamayense
- Municipal districts: 6
- Distance to: Santo Domingo: 217 km

Tamayo is a city and a municipality in the Baoruco province of the Dominican Republic. Tamayo is the driest location in the Dominican Republic and the only-one with a desertic climate.

== Geographical context ==
Tamayo is a small town filled with simple, fascinating people. Belonging to the province Baoruco, it is located on the eastern side of the Neyba valley, in the mountains of western Yaque del Sur River, which separates it from the municipality of Vicente Noble in the province of Barahona, south of San Juan de la Maguana and east of the Galván township.

=== Climate ===
Its location over a number of rain shadows through the highlands of Hispaniola from the northeasterly trade winds gives Tamayo a desert climate (Köppen BWh). Rainfall is negligible during most of the year, except between May–June and August–September.

- Average annual rainfall: 392.9 millimetres (15.47 in)
- Average annual temperature: 26.8 °C (80.2 °F)

Climate data for Tamayo, Dominican Republic (1961–1990)
Month	Jan	Feb	Mar	Apr	May	Jun	Jul	Aug	Sep	Oct	Nov	Dec	Year
Record high °C (°F)	37.0 (98.6)	36.0 (96.8)	35.8 (96.4)	36.6 (97.9)	36.2 (97.2)	36.1 (97.0)	39.9 (103.8)	39.5 (103.1)	38.4 (101.1)	38.7 (101.7)	38.2 (100.8)	35.5 (95.9)	39.9 (103.8)
Mean daily maximum °C (°F)	31.0 (87.8)	31.1 (88.0)	31.3 (88.3)	31.5 (88.7)	31.9 (89.4)	32.4 (90.3)	33.3 (91.9)	33.3 (91.9)	33.2 (91.8)	32.8 (91.0)	32.5 (90.5)	31.6 (88.9)	32.2 (90.0)
Daily mean °C (°F)	25.2 (77.4)	25.4 (77.7)	25.8 (78.4)	26.5 (79.7)	27.1 (80.8)	27.6 (81.7)	28.1 (82.6)	28.0 (82.4)	28.0 (82.4)	27.7 (81.9)	27.0 (80.6)	25.8 (78.4)	26.9 (80.4)
Mean daily minimum °C (°F)	19.4 (66.9)	19.8 (67.6)	20.4 (68.7)	21.5 (70.7)	22.4 (72.3)	22.8 (73.0)	22.9 (73.2)	22.8 (73.0)	22.9 (73.2)	22.6 (72.7)	21.6 (70.9)	20.0 (68.0)	21.6 (70.9)
Record low °C (°F)	13.9 (57.0)	12.6 (54.7)	12.4 (54.3)	15.5 (59.9)	19.0 (66.2)	19.8 (67.6)	19.8 (67.6)	19.8 (67.6)	19.3 (66.7)	19.0 (66.2)	16.0 (60.8)	14.8 (58.6)	12.4 (54.3)
Average rainfall mm (inches)	7.0 (0.28)	8.8 (0.35)	15.5 (0.61)	30.8 (1.21)	64.3 (2.53)	61.8 (2.43)	23.6 (0.93)	60.4 (2.38)	61.4 (2.42)	59.6 (2.35)	30.7 (1.21)	19.4 (0.76)	443.3 (17.45)
Average rainy days (≥ 1.0 mm)	1.2	1.2	1.7	3.1	5.1	3.9	2.0	3.3	5.0	4.8	2.7	1.1	35.1
Source: NOAA

== Population ==
The municipality of Tamayo has six municipal districts, which are Cabeza de Toro, Mena, Monserrate, Santa Barbara (Batey 6), Santana and Uvilla. Cabeza de Toro is Guanarate sections to the mangito and El Granado. Mena is composed of Mena Up, Down Mena, Los Robles, Mena Batey and Los Blocks of Mena.

Monserrate contains Santa Maria and Hato Nuevo, while Santana contains Bayahonda, Batey Santana, Los Conuquitos, San Ramon and Barranca. Barranca in turn contains both Vuelta Grande and Honduras. Uvilla also contains Jobo section.

According to a 2002 population census, the municipality has about 9895 inhabitants, of whom 6609 live in urban areas and 3286 in the rural areas.

== History ==
The land was first populated during the 18th century. The territory was unspoiled, whose flora and fauna caused the admiration of the first settlers who arrived from Cambronal. The newcomers started their Bohíos and began raising livestock in an enclosure which called Hatice (small pigsty of calves). This began Hatice (today Tamayo). Its first settlers were enterprising, but few of them could read and write.

The first families were: Manuel Medina and Menecita Reyes, Juan Rodriguez and Remedy Salome Mateo, Simon Altagracia Medina and Reyes Brito and Pedro Brito.

Many of these families come from the existing inhabitants of the place. They soon built the first canal to irrigate land (Hatice), the Palmar, The Figs, UC and Monserrate.

In 1908, with the arrival of a large cyclone, the river Yaque del Sur rose and flooded the land of Hatice, destroying this town. It was the largest flood that was covered in the news. The animals were drowned up above the trees, and four goats that were saved were used to feed children until they reached San Juan de la Maguana and El Cercado with food to help the victims.

The houses were traditional Hatice Tejamaní. The first wooden house built by the general Joaquin Campos and the second house was Mrs. Maria Antonia Gomez. They also built the first school, which the teacher was Maria Antonia Gomez, the first teacher of the town. The Lyceum of the town today bears his name.

Trujillo Palmar Jam Duverger attached the town to the province of Baoruco on March 10, 1943. Since the place formerly known as Hatrice was renamed Tamayo in memory of an Indian.

The first president of the council was Michael Humberto, the first syndic was Fabian Matos, who built the City Park.

== Economic activities ==
Tamayo is one of the areas where banana farming has the highest production. It produces the largest quantity of bananas (called barahoneros) because in the administrative division of the agricultural sector, the town belongs to the agricultural region of Barahona.

Like the municipality of Vicente Noble, the economics of Tamayo has been boosted in recent months.

In 2007, the City Council received on a monthly basis by ordering the transfer of the General Budget, through the Dominican Municipal League. Each District Board in turn receives $500000.00 (Five Hundred Thousand Pesos) for the same transfer.

== Education ==
The municipality operates 17 elementary schools, most with two rounds (morning and afternoon), a high school and a secondary school.

== Health care ==
The municipality operates seven rural clinics and a city hospital, which make up the physical infrastructure in health care available to Tamayo. Like other municipalities in the province of Barahona, cases that require specialized medical care are sent to the Jaime Mota regional hospital.

== Culture and Religion ==
San Antonio is the patron saint of the townspeople, who celebrate their festival on June 13.
