= Nuevo Sabana Yegua =

- Location within the Dominican Republic
- Coordinates: 18°43′12″N 71°1′12″W
- Country: Dominican Republic
- Province: Azua

Population (2008)
  - Total: 11,300
- Climate: Aw

Nuevo Sabana Yegua is a town in the Azua province of the Dominican Republic.

== Sources ==
- – World-Gazetteer.com
