= Port of Azua =

Port of Azua is located in Azua Province, Dominican Republic.

== Overview ==
Port of Azua was built in 1959 by Rafael Leonidas Trujillo. The harbor has two terminals, one of those is utilized by Compañía de Gas Licuado de Petróleo Opuvisa (Petroleum Gas Company) which has installed containers of gas.

The other terminal is used for exportation of fruits (bananas), minerals and others, and occasionally general cargo operations are handled, too.

== Port information ==
- Location: 18°20′45″N 70°50′10″W
- Local time: UTC−4
- Weather/climate/prevailing winds: From May 15 until September 15
- Climate: mostly sunny, tropical. Hurricane season runs from June to November
- Prevailing winds: direction ENE–ESE
- Average temperature range: 28–30 °C

== See also ==
- List of ports and harbours of the Atlantic Ocean
