= Azua Province =

Province of the Dominican Republic

Azua
- Province
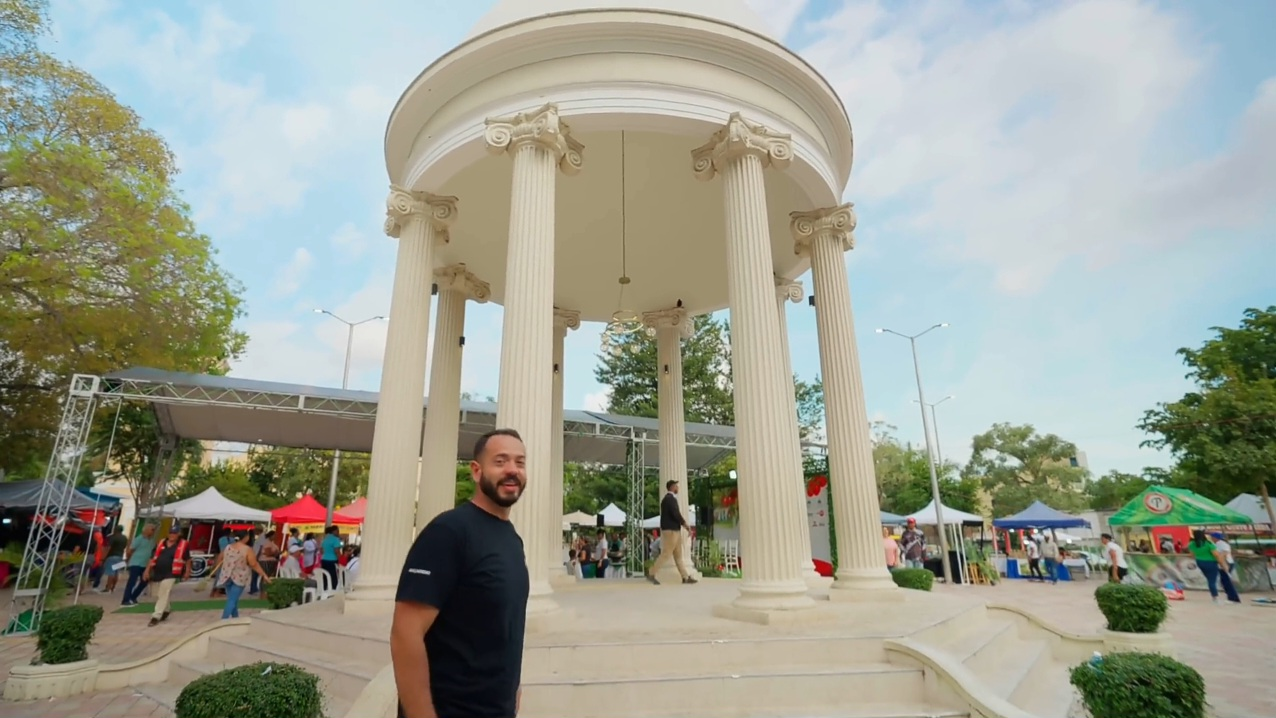

- Coat of arms
- Motto: The Athens of the South
- Location of the Azua Province
- Country: Dominican Republic
- Province since: 1844
- Capital: Azua

Government
  - Type: Subdivisions
  - Body: 10 municipalities 22 municipal districts
  - Congresspersons: 1 Senator; 4 Deputies

Area
  - Total: 2,531.77 km^{2} (977.52 sq mi)

Population (2014)
  - Total: 298,246
  - Density: 117.801/km^{2} (305.104/sq mi)
- Time zone: UTC-4 (EST)
- Area code: 1-809 1-829 1-849
- ISO 3166-2: DO-02
- Postal Code: 71000

Azua (Spanish pronunciation: [ˈaswa]) is a province which is collectively one of the thirty-two provinces of the Dominican Republic. It is divided into 10 municipalities (the same as Santiago) and its capital city is Azua de Compostela. It is bordered by the provinces of La Vega to the north-east, San José de Ocoa and Peravia to the east, Barahona and Baoruco to the west and San Juan to the north-west. To the south, Azua has a significant coastline of the Caribbean Sea. Azua is known for its diverse geography and climate, with the southern part of the province having an arid climate that is not the typical tropical-like that is found in other parts of the Caribbean.

== Geography ==
The southern part of the province is located in the Llanura or Llano de Azua (also known as the "Plena de Azua"), a coastal plain surrounded by mountains that act as barriers to the water-laden winds so that the lower parts of the province are very arid.

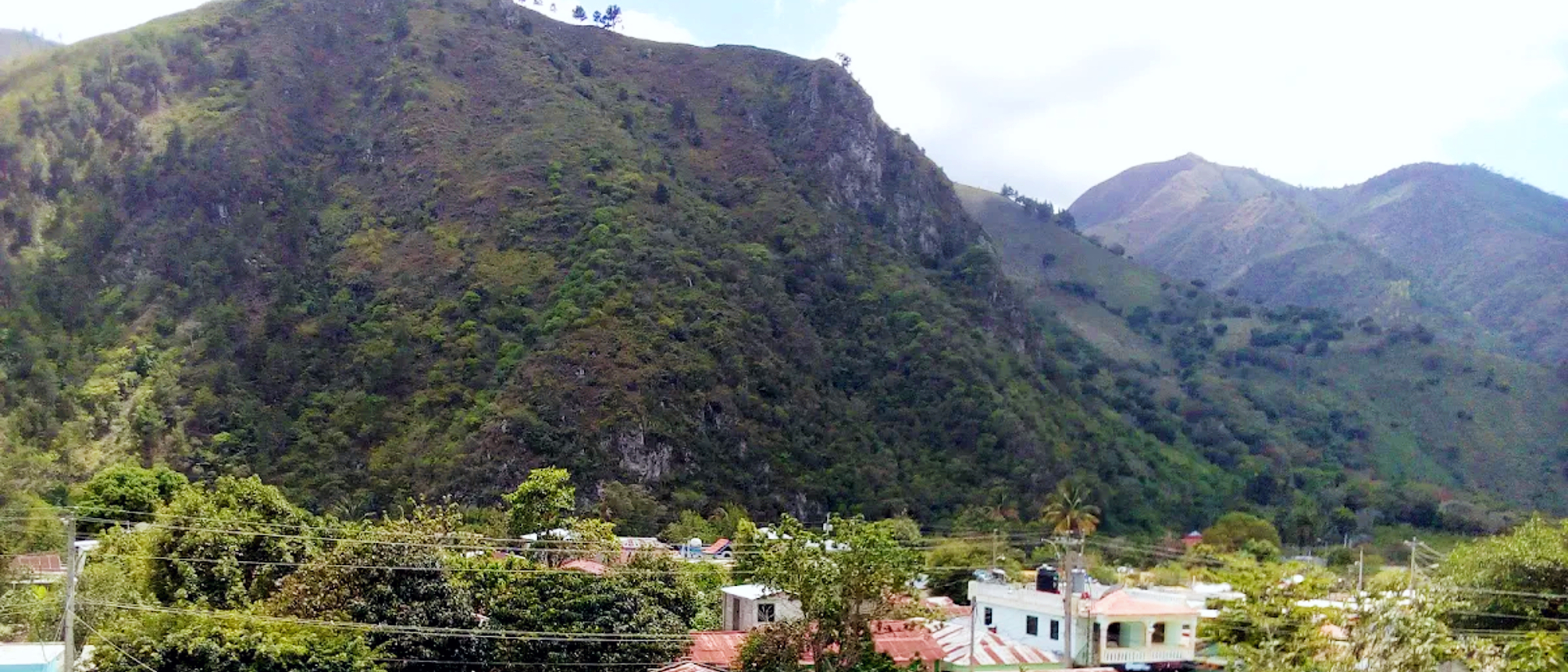
Mountains in Guayabal, Azua province

Azua had the Sierra de Ocoa, which is the southern end of the Cordillera Central, the tallest mountain range in the Caribbean. In the northern half of the province is also the Cordillera Central. In the southwest, on the border with the Barahona and Baoruco provinces, are the Martín García and Neiba mountain ranges.

== Municipalities and municipal districts ==

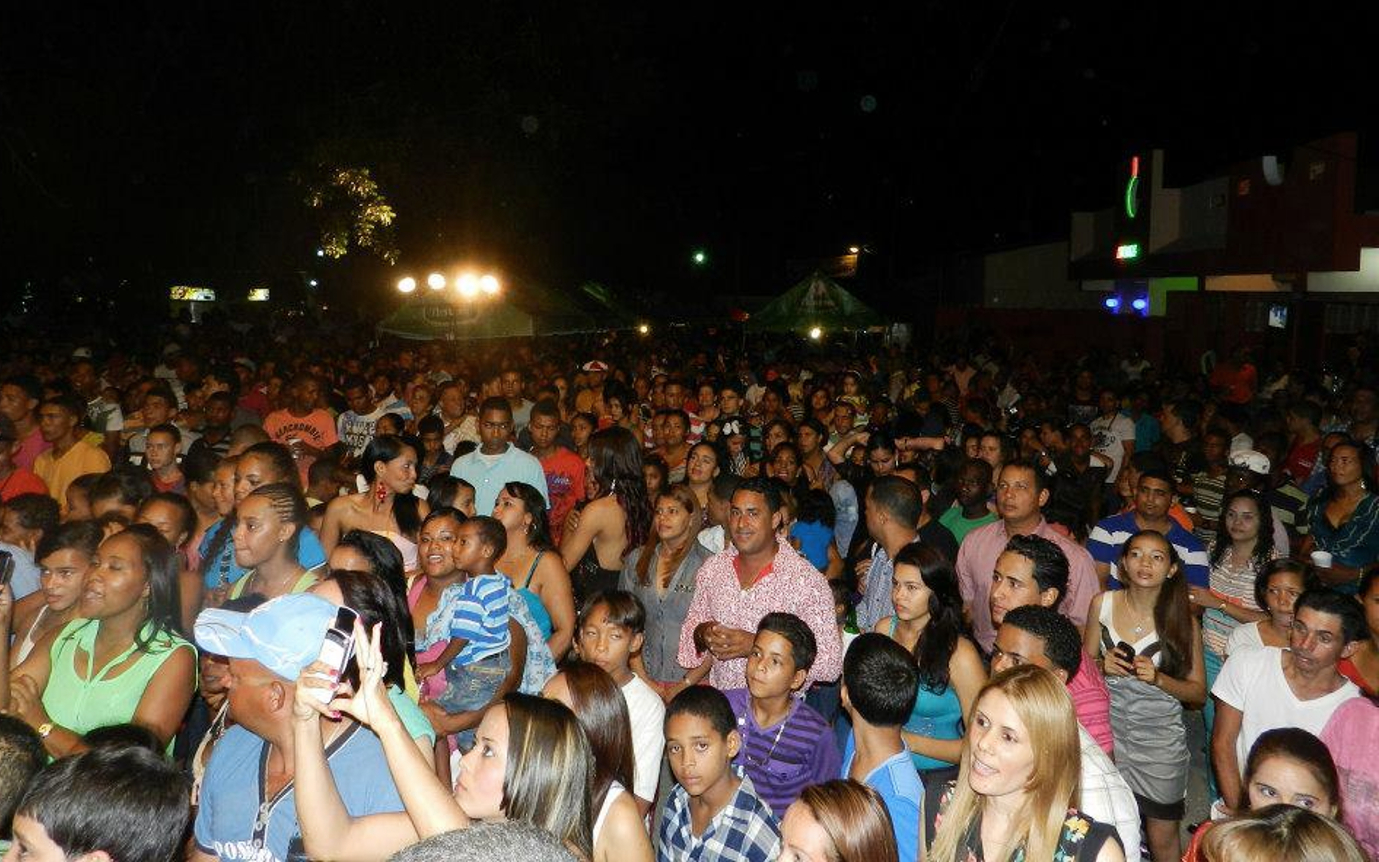
Azua Dominican Republic city people.

The province as of 20 June 2006 is divided into the following municipalities (municipios) and municipal districts (distrito municipal – D.M.) within them:

- Azua (Azua de Compostela)
  - Barreras (D.M.)
  - Barro Arriba (D.M.)
  - Clavellina (D.M.)
  - Emma Balaguer Viuda Vallejo (D.M.)
  - Las Barias-La Estancia (D.M.)
  - Las Lomas (D.M.)
  - Los Jovillos (D.M.)
  - Puerto Viejo (D.M.)
- Estebanía
- Guayabal
- Las Charcas
  - Hatillo (D.M.)
  - Palmar de Ocoa (D.M.)
- Las Yayas de Viajama
  - Hato Nuevo-Cortés (D.M.)
  - Villarpando (D.M.)
- Padre Las Casas
  - La Siembra (D.M.)
  - Las Lagunas (D.M.)
  - Los Fríos (D.M.)
- Peralta
- Pueblo Viejo
  - El Rosario (D.M.)
- Sabana Yegua
  - Ganadero (D.M.)
  - Proyecto 2 ( D.M.)
  - Proyecto 4 (D.M.)
- Tábara Arriba
  - Amiama Gómez (D.M.)
  - Los Toros (D.M.)
  - Tábara Abajo (D.M.)

== Population ==
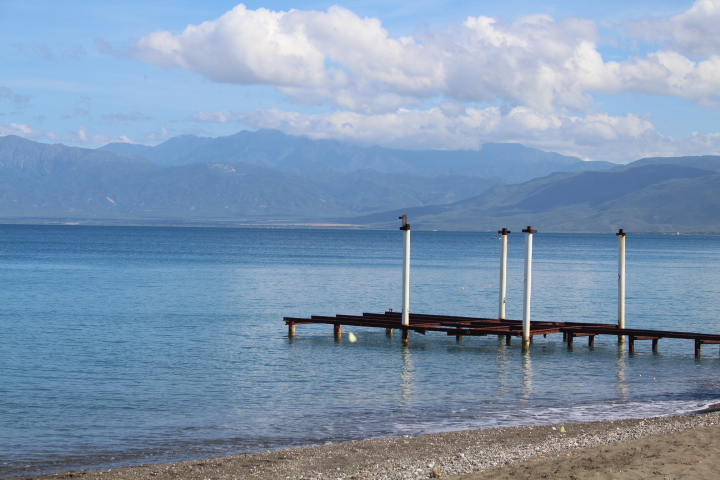
Palmar de Ocoa in Azua, Dominican Republic.

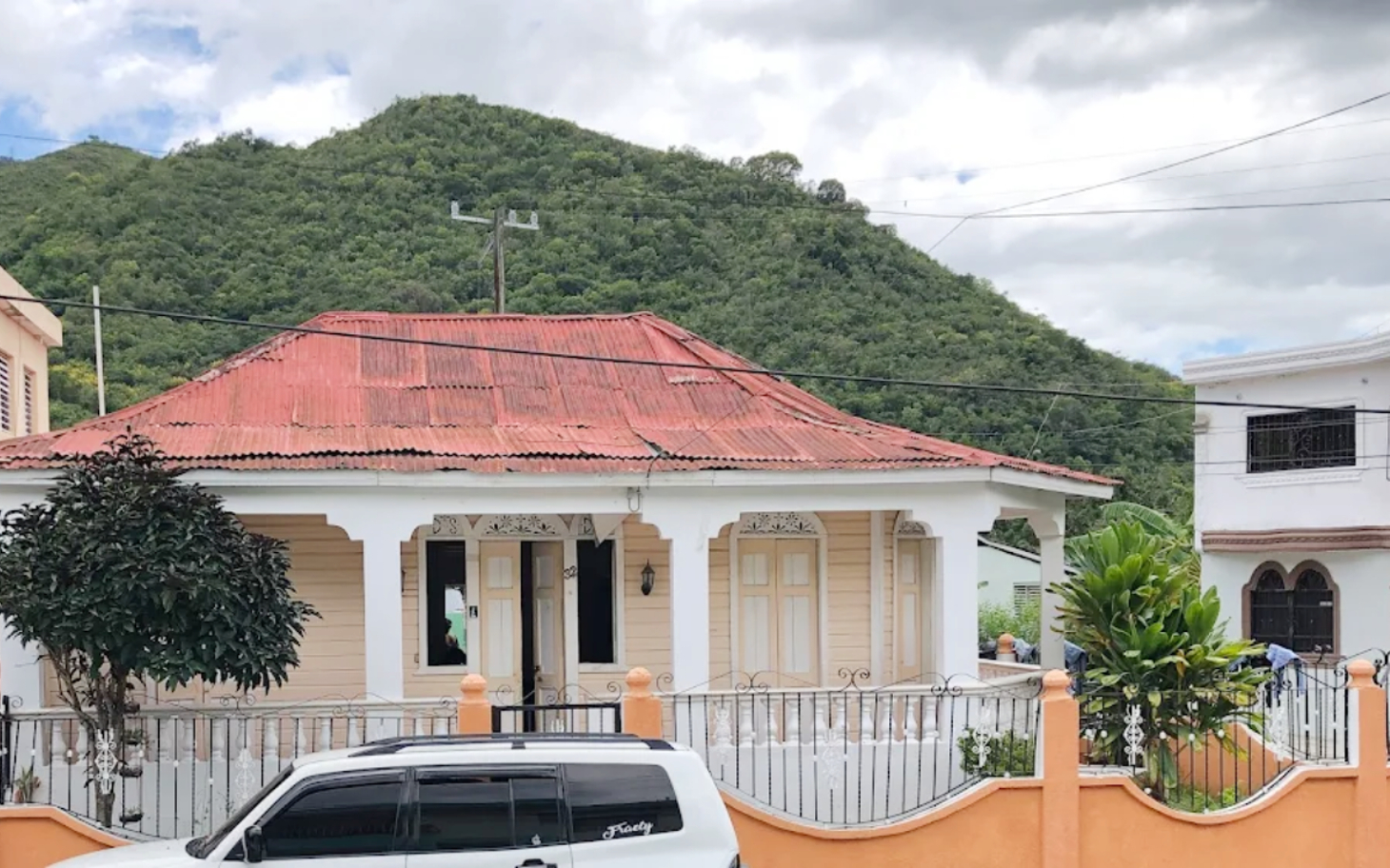
Peralta, Azua, Dominican Republic rural countryside.

The following is a sortable table of the municipalities and municipal districts with population figures as of the 2014 estimate. Urban population are those living in the seats (cabeceras literally heads) of municipalities or of municipal districts. Rural population are those living in the districts (Secciones literally sections) and neighborhoods (Parajes literally places) outside them. The population figures are from the 2014 population estimate.

Name	Total population	Urban population	Rural population
Azua de Compostela	125,487	88,493	36,994
Estebanía	8,522	4,407	4,115
Guayabal	6,855	3,464	3,391
Las Charcas	12,823	6,173	6,650
Padre Las Casas	42,321	21,965	20,356
Peralta	17,252	5,731	11,521
Pueblo Viejo	13,522	3,825	9,697
Sabana Yegua	24,051	6,944	17,107
Tábara Arriba	25,212	12,644	12,568
Yayas de Viajama	22,201	15,761	6,440
Azua province	298,246	169,407	128,839

For comparison with the municipalities and municipal districts of other provinces see the list of municipalities and municipal districts of the Dominican Republic.

== See also ==
- Port of Azua
