= Yagua (disambiguation) =

The Yagua are an indigenous people of Peru and Colombia.

Yagua may also refer to:

- Yagua language, spoken by the Yagua people
- Yagua, Venezuela: A town and civic parish of Venezuela

== See also ==
- Peba–Yaguan languages, a language family of the western Amazon
