= Las Charcas =

- Coordinates: 18°27′00″N 70°37′12″W
- Country: Dominican Republic
- Province: Azua

Area
  - Total: 251.23 km^{2} (97.00 sq mi)

Las Charcas is a town in the Azua province of the Dominican Republic. As per a 2012 census, it had 12,345 inhabitants.
