= Las Yayas de Viajama =

- Location within the Dominican Republic
- Coordinates: 18°36′0″N 70°55′12″W
- Country: Dominican Republic
- Province: Azua

Area
  - Total: 472.54 km^{2} (182.45 sq mi)

Population (2012)
  - Total: 7,142
  - Density: 15.11/km^{2} (39.15/sq mi)
- Climate: Aw

Las Yayas de Viajama is a town in the Azua province of the Dominican Republic.

== Sources ==
- – World-Gazetteer.com
