= Padre Las Casas, Dominican Republic =

Padre Las Casas
- Municipality
- Location within the Dominican Republic
- Coordinates: 18°44′N 70°56′W
- Country: Dominican Republic
- Province: Azua

Area
  - Total: 496.98 km^{2} (191.89 sq mi)

Population (2012)
  - Total: 40,545
  - Density: 81.583/km^{2} (211.30/sq mi)
- Time zone: UTC-4
- Area code: 1 809/829
- Climate: Aw

Padre Las Casas is a municipality (municipio) of the Azua province in the Dominican Republic. It includes the municipal districts (distritos municipal) of La Siembra, Las Lagunas, and Los Fríos.

Padre Las Casas is located in the foothills of the Cordillera Central. The economy of the town is as a service depot for local farmers and farmers for quite a distance into the mountains to which it is the easiest point of contact. There is also a large service economy and an efficient bus cooperative that connects mainly with Azua and the towns along the way. Full-time employment for males runs about 50% but many males do some kind of work but much of this pays less than a dollar an hour, while entrepreneurs in retail and other small businesses may easily make the owner a 200–500 weekly income. The disparity is great even in the microcosm of this small town.

== Notable people ==
- Amaury German Airisty (1947-1972), political activist
- Geovanny Vicente (born 1986), CNN columnist, political strategist and professor at Columbia University
- Kinito Méndez (born 1996), merengue singer
