= Azua, Dominican Republic =

City in the Dominican Republic

Azua de Compostela
- Municipality
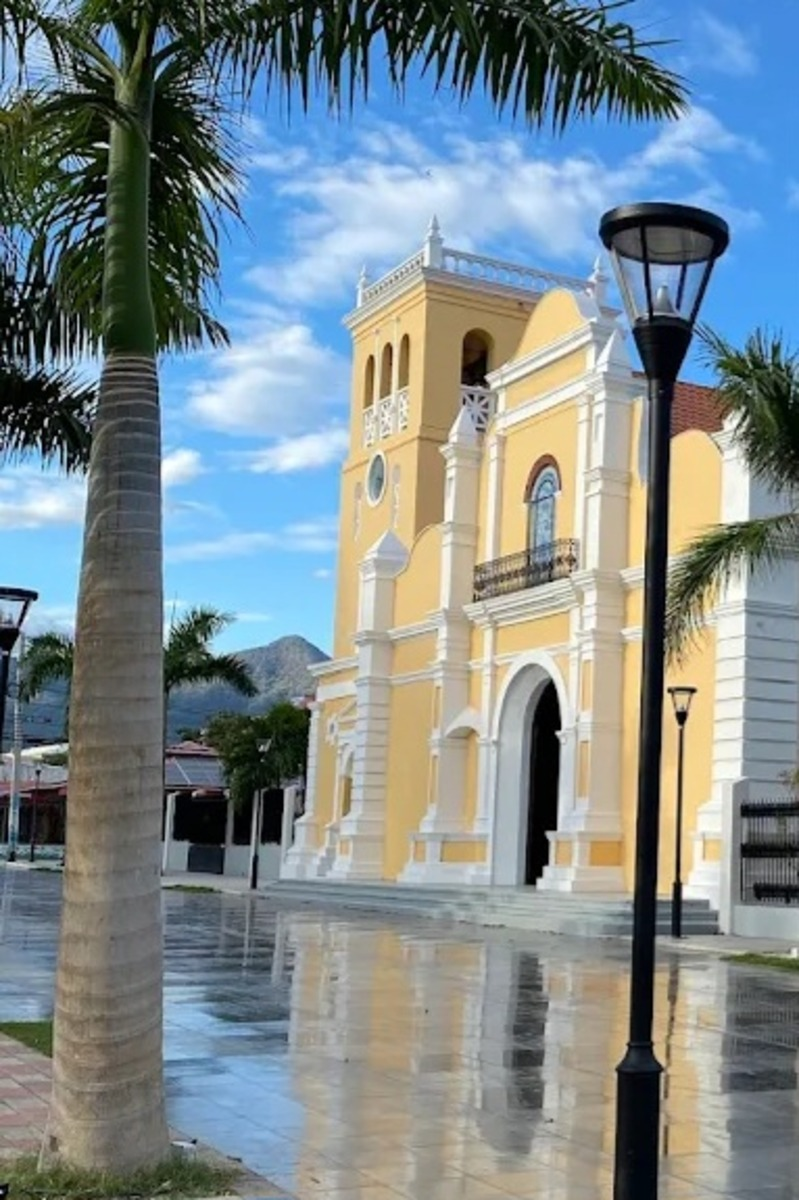
- Church of Azua De Compostela

- Coat of arms

- Location within the Dominican Republic
- Coordinates: 18°27′36″N 70°44′24″W
- Country: Dominican Republic
- Province: Azua
- Founded: 1504
- Municipality since: 1844

Area
  - Total: 416.30 km^{2} (160.73 sq mi)
- Elevation: 83 m (272 ft)

Population (2012)
  - Total: 128,264
  - Density: 308.10/km^{2} (797.99/sq mi)
  - Urban: 92,585
  - Rural: 35,679
  - Demonym: Azuano(a)
- Municipal Districts: 8
- Climate: BSh

Azua de Compostela, also known simply as Azua, is a city, municipality (municipio) and capital of Azua Province in the southern region of Dominican Republic. Founded in 1504, Azua is one of the oldest European settlements in the Americas. The town is located 100 kilometres west of the national capital, Santo Domingo.

== History ==
The territory was part of the chiefdom of Maguana, one of the five Taino chiefdoms in the island. Christopher Columbus encountered great difficulties that forced him and his companions to take refuge in the Bay of Ocoa, in the eastern part of the Azua territory. There he met the resistance of the Great (Cacique) of Azua Cuyocagua, whom the Admiral tried to subdue without success.

The town of Azúa de Compostela was officially founded in 1504 by Diego Velázquez de Cuéllar (conqueror of Cuba), during the government of Don Nicolás de Ovando. The famous conqueror of Mexico Hernán Cortés also resided in the town for several years (1504–1511). During his stay in Azua he used to spend his hours of leisure on the Monte Río beach.

== Economy ==
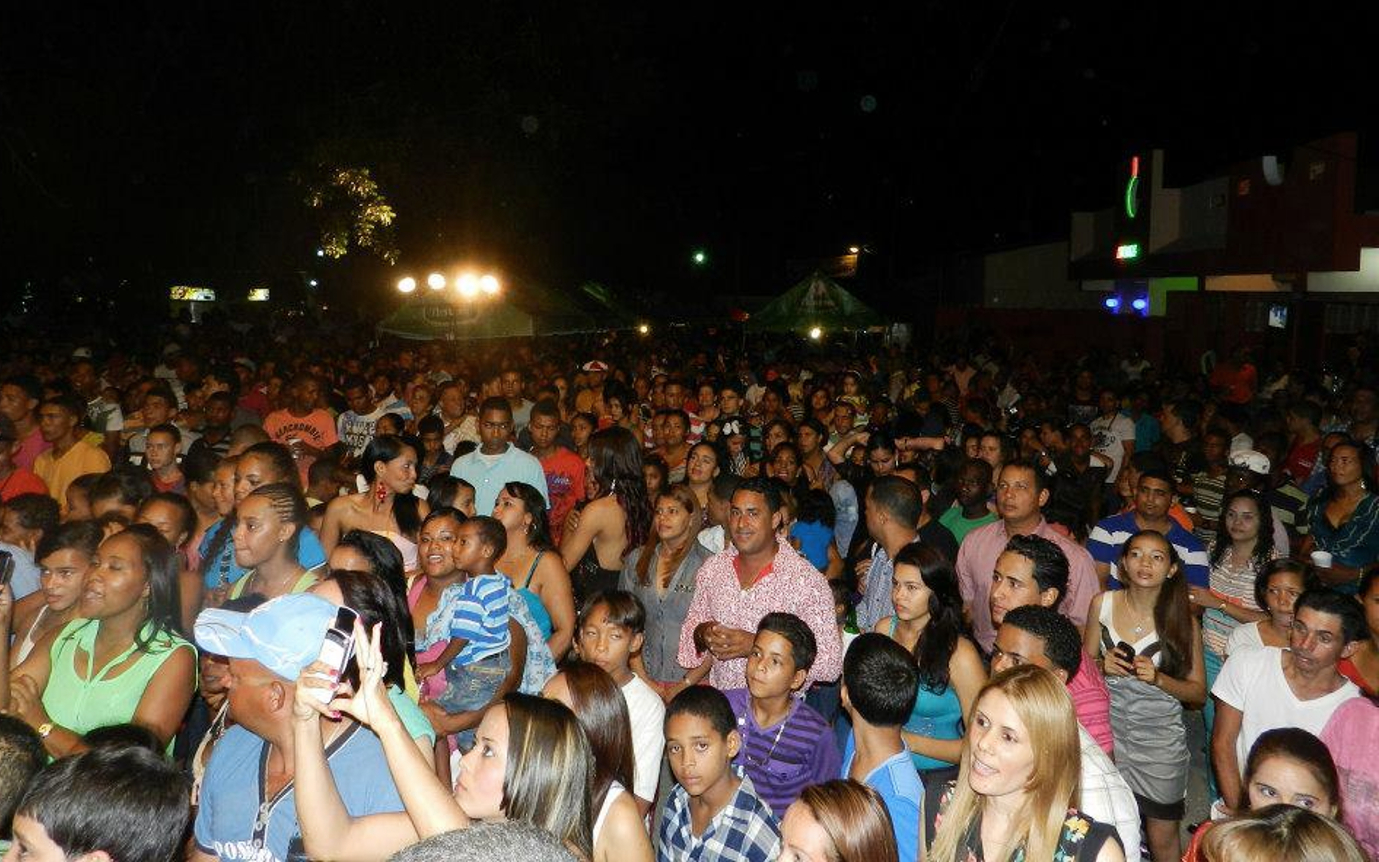
Azua, Dominican Republic people.

Azua has an active population (of working age) of 23,242 people of which 16,167 work, 69% of the economically active population. Of those who work, 20% are public servants (3,232 people). Most of the area of the municipality is concentrated in medium-sized properties, in which combined technology is used, with a predominance of mechanization. Large properties, with more than 800 tasks (one task = 628.83 m^{2}), are in the hands of a few large producers.

The municipality has been one of the most benefited with the installation of agro-industrial companies covered by Law 409, which has stimulated the development of the public and private financial sector.

== Population ==
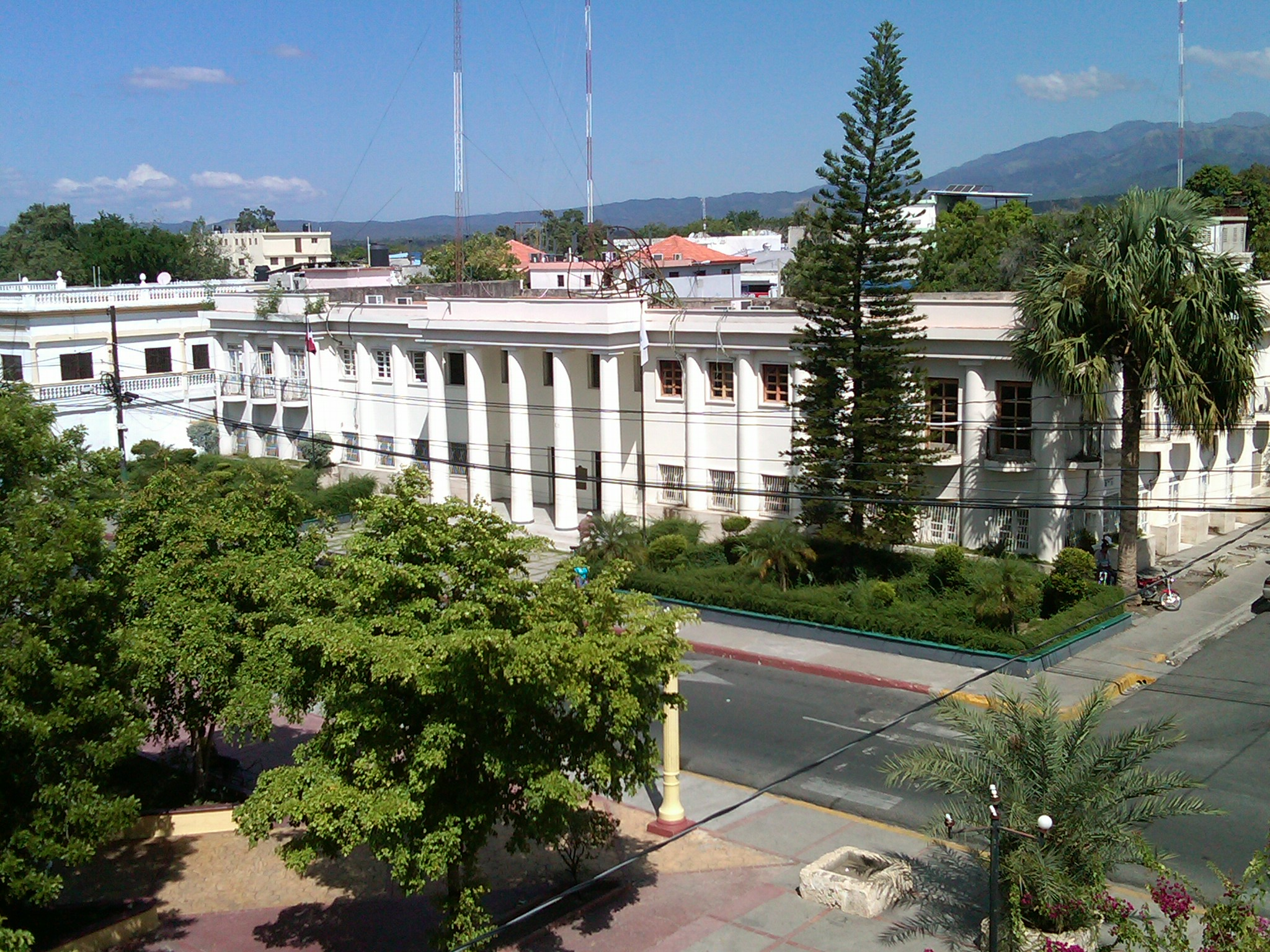
Azua, Dominican Republic town hall.

As of the Dominican Republic's 2012 census, the municipality had a total population of 128,264 inhabitants, of which 92,585 lived in urban areas and 35,679 in rural areas.

It includes the municipal districts (distritos municipal) of Barreras, Barro Arriba, Clavellina, Emma Balaguer Viuda Vallejo, Las Barías-La Estancia, Las Lomas, Los Jovillos, Sabana Yegua and Puerto Viejo.

The municipality is divided into 20 neighborhoods, and these in turn into 12 sub-neighborhoods.

These are the city's neighborhoods and their respective sub-neighborhoods (in parentheses): Los Cartones, Simón Striddels, La Bombita (Los Solares, Villa Esperanza, Los Acostados, Canta la Rana and San Miguel), Villa Esperanza (Cambodia, Restaurador, Military and Resolí), City Center, Pueblo Abajo, Savica (Framboyán Urbanization), Los Mangos, Buenos Aires (Cañada del Concón or Altos del Cacheo), La Colonia Española, Social Improvement, Pajarito, La Nevera, La Frontera, El Prado, Alto de las Flores, Quisqueya Urbanization (Quisqueya II Urbanization), Juan Pablo Duarte, Acapulco and Los Parceleros.

== Climate ==
Its location in the direct lee of the trade winds gives Azua de Compostela a hot semi-arid climate (Köppen BSh) in which there is frequently little rainfall outside of the hurricane season from August to October.

Climate data for Azua (1961-1990)
Month	Jan	Feb	Mar	Apr	May	Jun	Jul	Aug	Sep	Oct	Nov	Dec	Year
Record high °C (°F)	35.0 (95.0)	36.0 (96.8)	36.5 (97.7)	36.8 (98.2)	37.8 (100.0)	37.0 (98.6)	38.7 (101.7)	39.0 (102.2)	37.8 (100.0)	37.0 (98.6)	36.8 (98.2)	35.0 (95.0)	39.0 (102.2)
Mean daily maximum °C (°F)	31.1 (88.0)	31.5 (88.7)	31.8 (89.2)	32.2 (90.0)	32.3 (90.1)	32.8 (91.0)	33.9 (93.0)	33.9 (93.0)	33.3 (91.9)	32.5 (90.5)	32.0 (89.6)	31.3 (88.3)	32.4 (90.3)
Mean daily minimum °C (°F)	19.2 (66.6)	19.6 (67.3)	20.5 (68.9)	21.4 (70.5)	22.3 (72.1)	22.7 (72.9)	23.1 (73.6)	23.1 (73.6)	22.8 (73.0)	22.3 (72.1)	21.2 (70.2)	19.7 (67.5)	21.5 (70.7)
Record low °C (°F)	14.5 (58.1)	15.2 (59.4)	15.1 (59.2)	16.2 (61.2)	19.2 (66.6)	19.2 (66.6)	19.9 (67.8)	19.5 (67.1)	19.8 (67.6)	18.2 (64.8)	15.5 (59.9)	14.5 (58.1)	14.5 (58.1)
Average rainfall mm (inches)	14.3 (0.56)	13.9 (0.55)	24.1 (0.95)	39.2 (1.54)	77.2 (3.04)	63.5 (2.50)	41.0 (1.61)	80.1 (3.15)	117.7 (4.63)	136.0 (5.35)	37.5 (1.48)	19.8 (0.78)	664.3 (26.15)
Average rainy days (≥ 0.1 mm)	1.4	1.6	2.5	3.8	6.8	5.0	3.5	5.5	7.2	8.6	4.1	1.8	51.8
Source: NOAA

== Notable people ==
- Sandy Alcántara (born 1995), baseball player
- Maikel Franco (born 1992), baseball player
- Geovanny Vicente (born 1986), CNN columnist, political strategist and professor
- Yennsy Díaz (born 1996), baseball player
- Edna Garrido Ramírez (1913–2010), ethnomusicologist
- Esteury Ruiz (born 1999), baseball player
- Francisca Lachapel (born 1989), actress, TV host
- Franchy Cordero (born 1994), baseball player
