= Municipio =

Administrative divisions in Italy and in several Hispanophone and Lusophone nations

A municipio (Spanish: [muniˈθipjo, muniˈsipjo]) or município (Portuguese: [muniˈsipju, muniˈsipiu]) is an administrative division in several Hispanophone and Lusophone nations, respectively. It is often translated as 'municipality' in English. It comes from mūnicipium (Latin: [muːnɪˈkɪpiʊ̃ˑ]), meaning 'township'.

In English, a municipality is often defined as relating to a single city or town, but in Spanish, the term municipio may not refer to a single city or town but rather a jurisdiction with several towns and cities such as a township, county, borough or civil parish. The Italian term municipalità (IPA: [muniˌt͡ʃipaliˈta]) refers to a single city or to a group of cities and towns in a township, and the term municipio (IPA: [muniˈt͡ʃiːpjo]) is used for city subdivisions. On the other hand, usage of município in Portuguese is almost entirely restricted to a cluster of cities or towns such as a county or township. However, in Brazil, a município is an independent city and a public corporation with the status of a federated entity. In the Philippines, a munisipyo (Tagalog: [mʊnɪˈsipjo]) may refer to a town hall.

== Overview ==
Country	Term	Detailed article	Administered by	Comment
Angola	Município is used	Municipalities of Angola		
Argentina	Municipio is used	Municipalities of Argentina		According to laws of the provinces
Bolivia	Municipio is used	Municipalities of Bolivia		Below provinces
Brazil	Município is used	Municipalities of Brazil		Município with elected (Prefeito) (mayor) and Vereador (plural: Vereadores) (councilors).They are part of the federation De facto et De jure
Chile	Comuna is used	Communes of Chile	Municipalidad with elected alcalde (mayor) and councilors	
Colombia	Municipio is used	Municipalities of Colombia		Below departments
Costa Rica	Municipalidad is used	Municipalities of Costa Rica		Coterminous with the Cantones
Cuba	Municipio is used	Municipalities of Cuba		
Dominican Republic	Municipio is used	Municipalities of the Dominican Republic	ayuntamiento (elected municipal council) and síndico (mayor)	
East Timor	Município is used	Municipalities of East Timor	Autoridade Municipal (Municipal Authority), with a president (presidente), along with a Municipal Council (Concelho Municipal)	
Ecuador	Cantón is used	Cantons of Ecuador	Municipio or Municipalidad with elected alcalde (mayor) and concejales (councilors)	Below provinces. Further subdivided into urban and rural parishes.
El Salvador	Municipio is used	Municipalities of El Salvador	Alcalde	Below departments
Equatorial Guinea	Municipio is used	Municipalities of Equatorial Guinea	Alcalde	
Guatemala	Municipio is used	Municipalities of Guatemala	Municipalidad	Below departments
Honduras	Municipalidad is used	Municipalities of Honduras	Alcalde	Below departments
Italy	Comune is used; in some parts of Italy the municipio is the building housing the administration of the comune; elsewhere it is simply called comune. A municipalità may be a subdivision of comune (Note: Municipalità refers only to administration, whereas comune refers to both administration and territory; it is also an administrative sub-division of a large city, such as Rome.)	Municipalities of Italy	Consiglio comunale, headed by a sindaco	
Mexico	Municipio is used	Municipalities of Mexico	Ayuntamiento, headed by a municipal president	Below states
Mozambique	Município is used	Municipalities of Mozambique		
Nicaragua	Municipio is used	Municipalities of Nicaragua	Alcalde	Below departments
Paraguay	Municipalidad is used	Municipalities of Paraguay		
Peru	Municipalidad is used	Municipalities of Peru		
Philippines	Municipio (munisipyo) and sometimes municipalidad (municipalidad) are used (Note: In Tagalog bayan (IPA: [ˈbaː.jɐn̪]), Cebuan lungsod (IPA: [ˈl̪uŋ.s̪od̪]), Iloco ili (IPA: [ˈʔi.li]), Hiligaynon banwa (IPA: [ˈban.wa]), Central Bicol banwaan (IPA: [ban̪ˈwa.ʔan̪]), Waray bungto (IPA: [ˈbuŋ.toʔ]), Kapampangan balen (IPA: [bəˈlɛːn]), Pangasinan baley (IPA: [ˈba.lɨɪ̯]).)	Municipalities of the Philippines	Elected alcalde (alkalde, “mayor”) (Note: In Tagalog punong-bayan (IPA: [ˌpuː.n̪omˈbaː.jɐn̪]), Cebuan punong-lungsod (IPA: [ˌpuː.n̪onˈl̪uŋ.s̪od̪]), Iloco basar (IPA: [baˈsaɾ]).) as the executive, vicealcalde (bise alkalde, “vice mayor”) (Note: In Tagalog pangalawang punong-bayan (IPA: [pɐ.ŋɐ.lɐˌwam puː.n̪omˈbaː.jɐn̪]), Cebuan puli-punong-lungsod (Cebuano pronunciation: [pu.li.pu.n̪onˈl̪uŋ.s̪od̪IPA]), Iloco kasandi a basar (IPA: [kasanˈdi a baˈsaɾ]).) and concejales (konsehal, “councilor”) of the Sangguniang Bayan (Note: In Tagalog Sangguniang Bayan (IPA: [sɐŋ.ɡʊ.n̪ɪˌʔam ˈbaː.jɐn̪]).) (Ayuntamiento, “Municipal Council”).	Below provinces (except Pateros); equivalent to a town; has a lower income than a city (Note: In Tagalog lungsod (IPA: [lʊn̪ˈsod̪̚]), Cebuan dakbayan (IPA: [d̪ɐk.bɐˈjan̪]), Iloco dak-ili (IPA: [dɐkˈʔi.li]), Hiligaynon dakbanwa (IPA: [dakˈban.wa]), Central Bicol dakbanwaan (IPA: [dak.ban̪ˈwa.ʔan̪]), Kapampangan lakanbalen (IPA: [lə.xəm.bəˈlɛn]).) (ciudad). Like a city, it is also further subdivided into barangays.
Portugal	Município is used (also called concelho)	Municipalities of Portugal	Câmara Municipal (executive) and Assembleia Municipal (legislative)	
Puerto Rico	Municipio is used	Municipalities of Puerto Rico	Alcalde and municipal legislature	
Spain	Municipio is used (Note: In Catalan municipi (IPA: [muniˈsipi]), Galician municipio (IPA: [muniˈθipjʊ]) or bisbarra (IPA: [bizˈβarɐ]) and Basque udalerria (IPA: [udaleria]).)	Municipalities of Spain	Ayuntamiento (municipal corporation) or Concejo abierto, headed by an alcalde	
Uruguay	Municipio is used	Municipalities of Uruguay	Alcaldía (municipal council), headed by an alcalde	
Venezuela	Municipio is used	Municipalities of Venezuela	Consejo Municipal (municipal council) with separately elected alcalde and independent comptroller	Below state

== See also ==
- Municipalidad
- Commune (country subdivision)
