= Provinces of the Dominican Republic =

First-level administrative divisions of the Dominican Republic

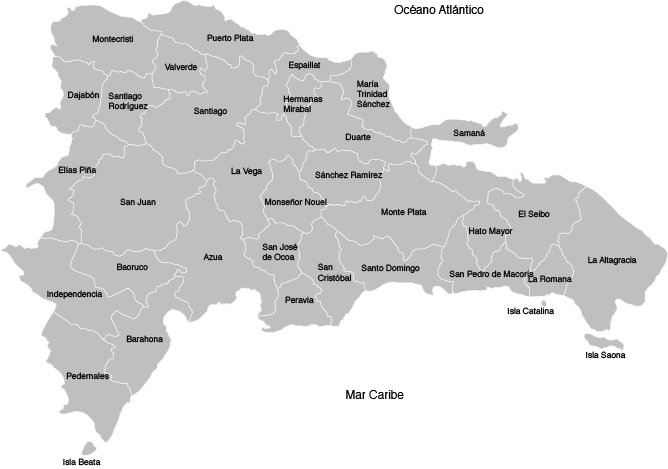
Provinces of the Dominican Republic map

The Dominican Republic is divided into 31 provinces (provincias), while the national capital, Santo Domingo, is contained within its own district.

The division of the country into provinces is laid down in the constitution (Title I, Section II, Article 5) and enacted by law. The latter is currently Law 5220 on the Territorial Division of the Dominican Republic (Ley No. 5220 sobre División Territorial de la República Dominicana), issued 1959 and frequently amended to create new provinces and lower-level administrative units.

== The provinces as administrative divisions ==
The provinces are the first-level administrative subdivisions of the country. The headquarters of the central government's regional offices are normally found in the capital cities of provinces. The president appoints an administrative governor (Gobernador Civil) for each province but not for the Distrito Nacional (Title IX of the constitution).

The provinces are divided into municipalities (municipios), which are the second–level political and administrative subdivisions of the country.

The Distrito Nacional was created in 1936. Prior to this, the Distrito Nacional was the old Santo Domingo Province, in existence since the country's independence in 1844. It is not to be confused with the new Santo Domingo Province, which split off from it in 2001. While it is similar to a province in many ways, the Distrito Nacional differs in its lack of an administrative governor and consisting only of one municipality, Santo Domingo, the city council (ayuntamiento) and mayor (síndico) which are in charge of its administration.

== The provinces as constituencies ==
The provinces are also constituencies for the elections to the bicameral National Congress (Congreso de la República). Each province elects one member of the Senate (Senado) and a guaranteed minimum of two members of the Chamber of Deputies (Cámara de Diputados).

== Statistics ==
The following is a table of the provinces and their capital cities. The population figures are from the 2021 population estimate.

Coat Of Arms	Province National District	Capital	Region	Department	Area (km^{2})	Population 2021	Density	Map	Establishment year
	Azua	Azua	South	Valdesia	2,531.77	222,610	86.59		1844
	Baoruco	Neiba	South	Enriquillo	1,282.23	101,306	77.40		1943
	Barahona	Santa Cruz de Barahona	South	Enriquillo	1,739.38	189,100	108.49		1881
	Dajabón	Dajabón	Cibao	Cibao Noroeste	1,020.73	66,675	63.95		1938
	Duarte	San Francisco de Macorís	Cibao	Cibao Nordeste	1,605.35	299,583	183.70		1896
	El Seibo	Santa Cruz de El Seibo	East	Yuma	1,786.80	94,049	63.58		1844
	Elías Piña	Comendador	South	El Valle	1,426.20	63,303	35.51		1942
	Espaillat	Moca	Cibao	Cibao Norte	838.62	240,428	281.97		1885
	Hato Mayor	Hato Mayor del Rey	East	Higuamo	1,329.29	85,747	64.37		1984
	Hermanas Mirabal	Salcedo	Cibao	Cibao Nordeste	440.43	92,045	209.78		1952
	Independencia	Jimaní	South	Enriquillo	2,006.44	58,951	27.73		1948
	La Altagracia	Salvaleón de Higüey	East	Yuma	3,010.34	360,874	104.61		1944
	La Romana	La Romana	East	Yuma	653.95	274,894	397.59		1944
	La Vega	Concepción de La Vega	Cibao	Cibao Sur	2,287.24	412,469	176.64		1844
	María Trinidad Sánchez	Nagua	Cibao	Cibao Nordeste	1,271.71	140,954	111.17		1959
	Monseñor Nouel	Bonao	Cibao	Cibao Sur	992.39	174,959	171.51		1991
	Monte Cristi	San Fernando de Monte Cristi	Cibao	Cibao Noroeste	1,924.35	117,736	59.22		1879
	Monte Plata	Monte Plata	East	Higuamo	2,632.14	191,447	71.68		1991
	Pedernales	Pedernales	South	Enriquillo	2,074.53	35,280	16.12		1957
	Peravia	Baní	South	Valdesia	792.33	198,499	241.62		1944
	Puerto Plata	San Felipe de Puerto Plata	Cibao	Cibao Norte	1,852.90	333,940	177.29		1850
	Samaná	Santa Bárbara de Samaná	Cibao	Cibao Nordeste	853.74	113,036	125.62		1867
	San Cristóbal	San Cristóbal	South	Valdesia	1,265.77	643,595	505.93		1932
	San José de Ocoa	San José de Ocoa	South	Valdesia	855.4	53,833	45.11		2000
	San Juan	San Juan de la Maguana	South	El Valle	3,569.39	220,264	266.12		1938
	San Pedro de Macorís	San Pedro de Macorís	East	Higuamo	1,255.46	306,002	83.66		1907
	Sánchez Ramírez	Cotuí	Cibao	Cibao Sur	1,196.13	151,888	121.09		1952
	Santiago	Santiago de los Caballeros	Cibao	Cibao Norte	2,836.51	1,052,088	355.30		1844
	Santiago Rodríguez	San Ignacio de Sabaneta	Cibao	Cibao Noroeste	1,111.14	57,209	51.71		1948
	Santo Domingo	Santo Domingo Este	South	Ozama	1,301.84	2,955,339	2036.08		2001
	Valverde	Mao	Cibao	Cibao Noroeste	823.38	177,865	207.06		1959
	Distrito Nacional	Santo Domingo	East	Ozama	104.44	1,049,567	9,651.45		1932

== Map ==
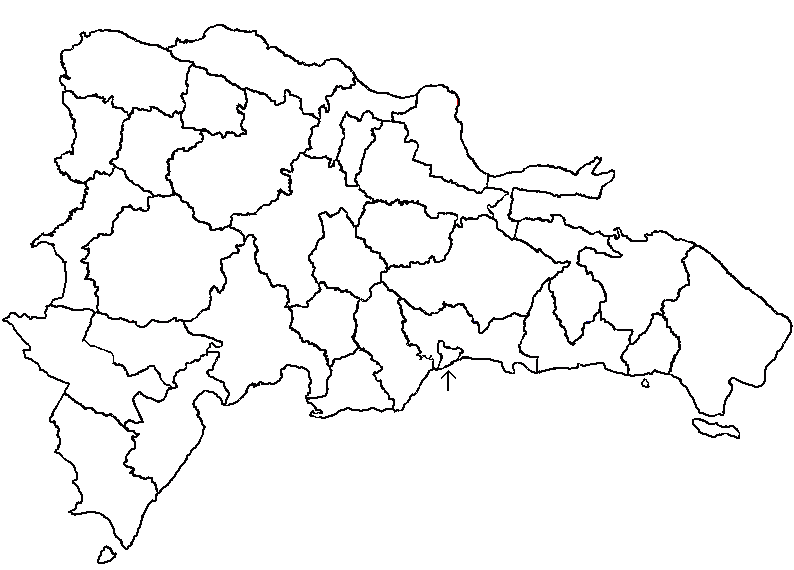

== See also ==
- Geography of the Dominican Republic
- Demographics of Dominican Republic
- ISO 3166-2:DO
