= Juan Santiago =

Juan Santiago can refer to:

- Juan Santiago, Dominican Republic, a municipality in the Elías Piña Province
- Juan Santiago (boxer), an American professional welterweight boxer
- Juan Santiago Gordón, a Chilean hurdler
- Juan Carlos Santiago, a former Spanish basketball player
- Juan Santiago, a character on General Hospital
- Juan Santiago (footballer), an Uruguayan footballer who played in the 1945 South American Championship
- Juan G. Santiago, American engineer
