= Artibonite River =

Artibonite
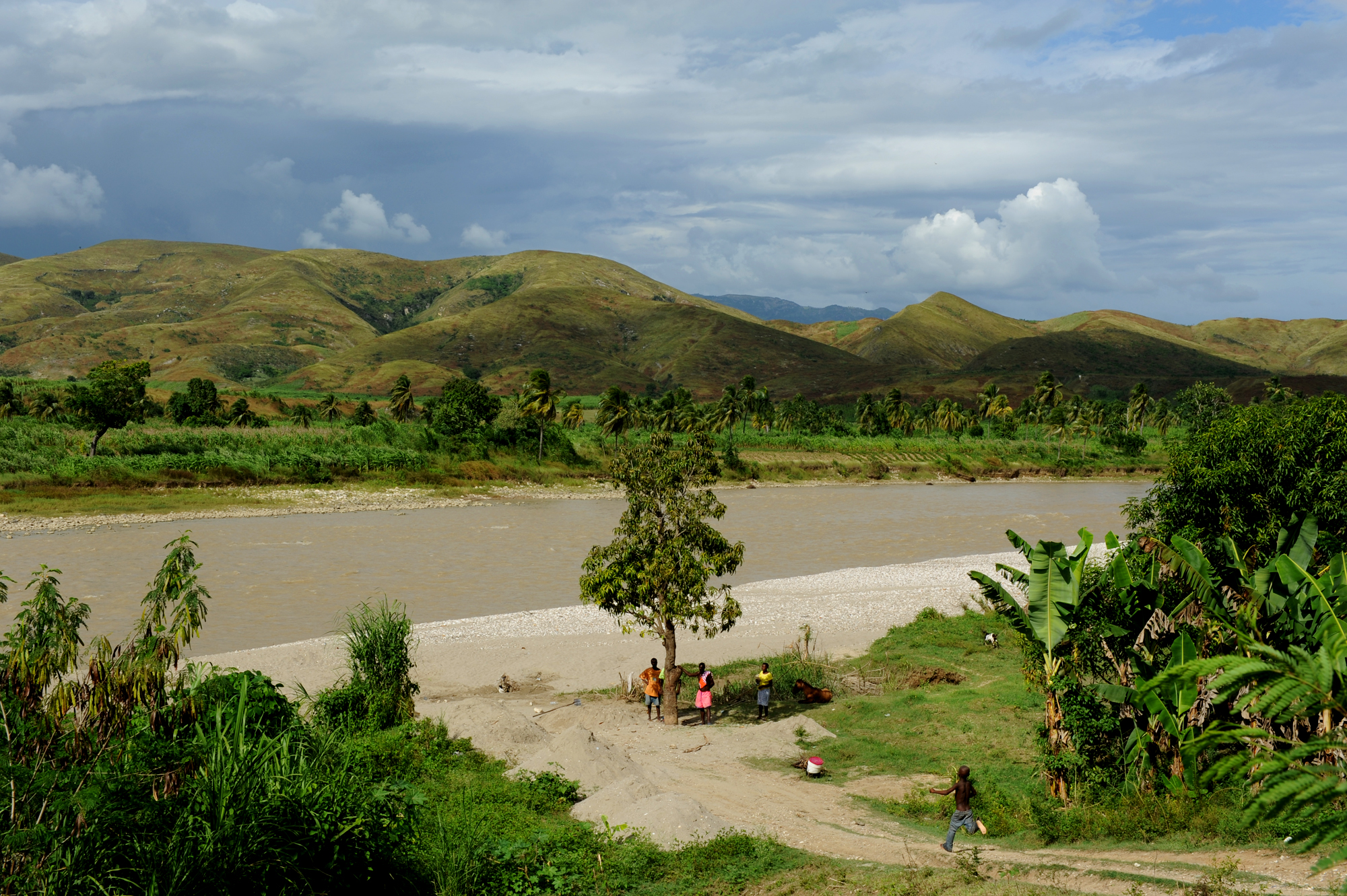

- Mouth of the Artibonite River in Haiti

Location
- Countries: Dominican Republic, Haiti
- Provinces: Elías Piña, Artibonite, Centre
- Major cities: Pedro Santana, Bánica, Mirebalais

Physical characteristics
- Mouth
  - coordinates: 19.25°N 72.783333°W
- Length: 321 km (199 mi)
- Basin size: 9,013 km^{2} (3,480 sq mi)

Basin features
- Tributaries
  - left: Vallecito, Joca, Tocino, Macasía, Rivière de Fer à Cheval, Gascogne, Guayamouc, La Thème, La Tombe
  - right: Rivière Blanche, Libón, Victorine, Thomonde, Boucan Carré, Rivière l'Estère, Rivière Lociane

The Artibonite River (French: Fleuve Artibonite; Spanish: Río Artibonito; Haitian Creole: Latibonit) is the longest river in Haiti, and the longest on the island of Hispaniola. It is also the second-longest river in the Caribbean, behind the Cauto River in Cuba. Forming part of the international border between Haiti and the Dominican Republic, the river's sources are in the Cordillera Central in the Dominican Republic (68 km); however, most of its length lies in Haiti (253 km).

== Etymology ==
The name is derived from the Taíno name of the river, Hatibonico.

== Course ==
The source of the Artibonite is to the northeast of Río Limpio, in the Cordillera Central, Dominican Republic. The mouth of the Artibonite is in Haiti, south of La Grand Saline. It flows into the Gulf of Gonâve.

The river is the border between the Dominican Republic and Haiti for several kilometres, from the town of Pedro Santana to the point where it is joined by the River Macasía, and then turns west into Haiti.

Its watershed has an area of 9,013 km^{2} (2,614 km^{2} in the Dominican Republic, 6,399 km^{2} in Haiti). Its discharge is 16.6 cubic metres per second at Pedro Santana.

== Tributaries ==
The Artibonite has several tributaries, most of them in Haiti. The most important tributaries are the Libón and Macasía in the Dominican Republic, and the Rivière de Fer à Cheval in Haiti.

== Environment ==
Deforestation and pollution has negatively affected the quality and amount of water in the Artibonite in the Dominican Republic, and even more so in Haiti. Very little fish remain in the river. American crocodiles (Crocodylus acutus) once inhabited the Artibonite and other rivers of Hispaniola, but now they are found only in the large lakes of the island (Lago Enriquillo and Etang Saumâtre).

== Uses ==
The water of the river is used for irrigation in Haiti, but not in the Dominican Republic, because it flows here through high mountains. The river is used for irrigation, and the Peligre Hydroelectric Dam situated on it produces Haiti's supply of hydroelectricity.

== Health ==
In October 2010, following a fatal cholera outbreak (the first in generations) in the Haitian headwaters of the river, locals were alerted that drinking untreated water from this river may spread the disease.
