= Partido =

Partido, partidista and partidario may refer to:

- Spanish for a political party, people who share political ideology or who are brought together by common issues

== Territorial subdivision ==
- Partidos of Buenos Aires, the second-level administrative subdivision in the Province of Buenos Aires, Argentina
- Judicial district, shortened from partido judicial in some Spanish-speaking countries
- Partido (region), a non-autonomous administrative region during the times of the Spanish Empire in the Americas

== Places ==
- Partido (historical province), a district in Camarines Sur, Philippines, and a historical province of the Philippines
- Partido, Dominican Republic, a town in Dajabón Province of the Dominican Republic
