= Pedro Santana, Dominican Republic =

Pedro Santana
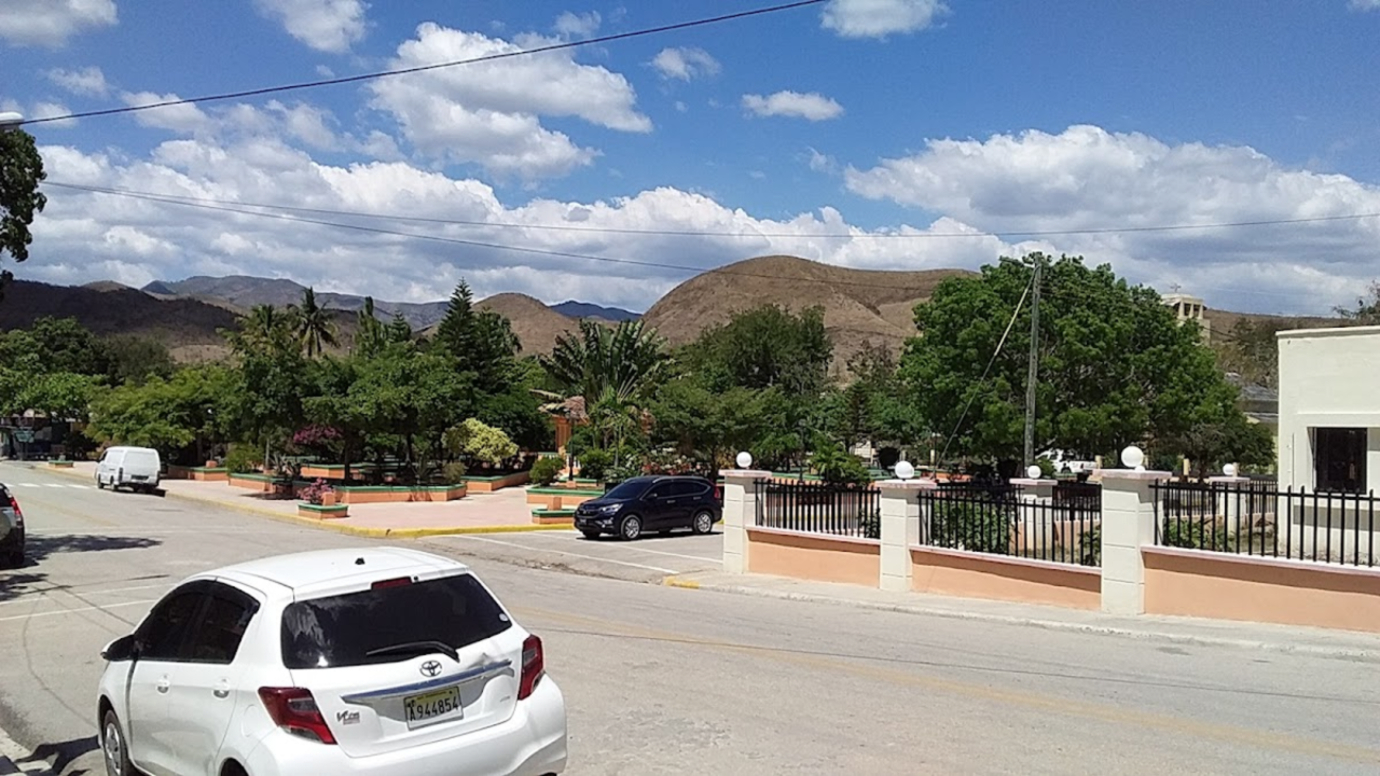
- Street view of Pedro Santana, Elias Pina, Dominican Republic

- Location within the Dominican Republic
- Coordinates: 19°06′18″N 71°42′00″W
- Country: Dominican Republic
- Province: Elías Piña
- Municipality since: 1952

Area
  - Total: 575.02 km^{2} (222.02 sq mi)

Population (2012)
  - Total: 4,875
  - Density: 8.478/km^{2} (21.96/sq mi)
- Distance to – Comendador: 52 km
- Municipalities: 1

Pedro Santana is a town in the province of Elías Piña in the Dominican Republic. It is located on the border region with Haiti.

The name of the town is in honor of Pedro Santana, the first constitutional president of the country, and general in the Dominican War of Independence.

== History ==
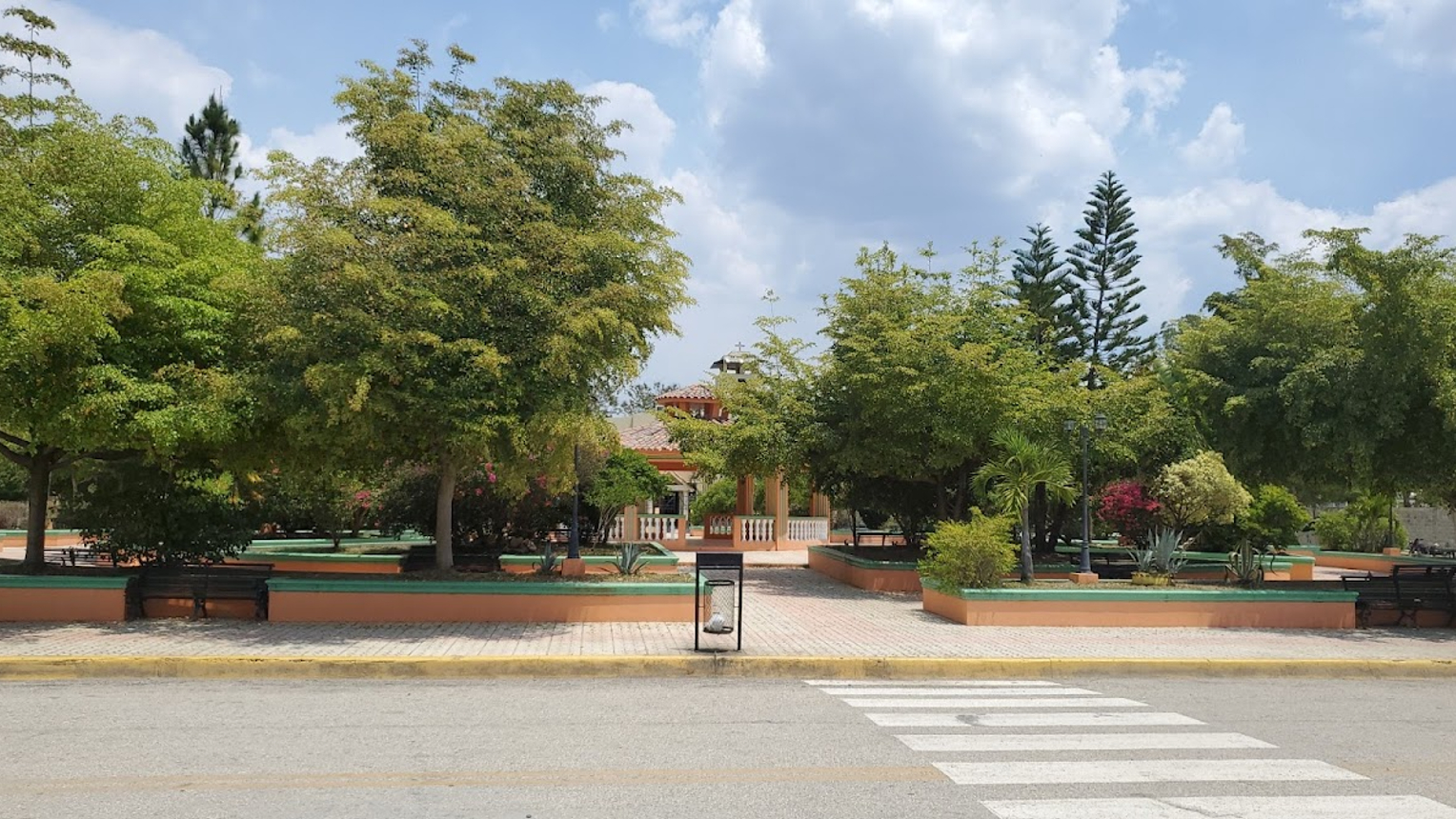
Elias Pina, Dominican Republic

The town of was historically a district of the city of Bánica. Through Law No. 3208 of March 3, 1952, the Municipal District of Pedro Santana, of the Común de Bánica, was elevated to the category of común (municipality).

In the 2002 census the population was 4,043, of which the urban is 1,183 (29.26%) and the rural population is 2,860. In turn, 2,207 were men and 1,836 women.

== Economy ==
The main economic activity of the municipality is agriculture.
