= El Llano Municipality =

El Llano Municipality may refer to:

- El Llano Municipality, Aguascalientes, Mexico
- El Llano, Elías Piña, Dominican Republic
