= Dajabón Province =

Province of the Dominican Republic

Dajabón
- Province
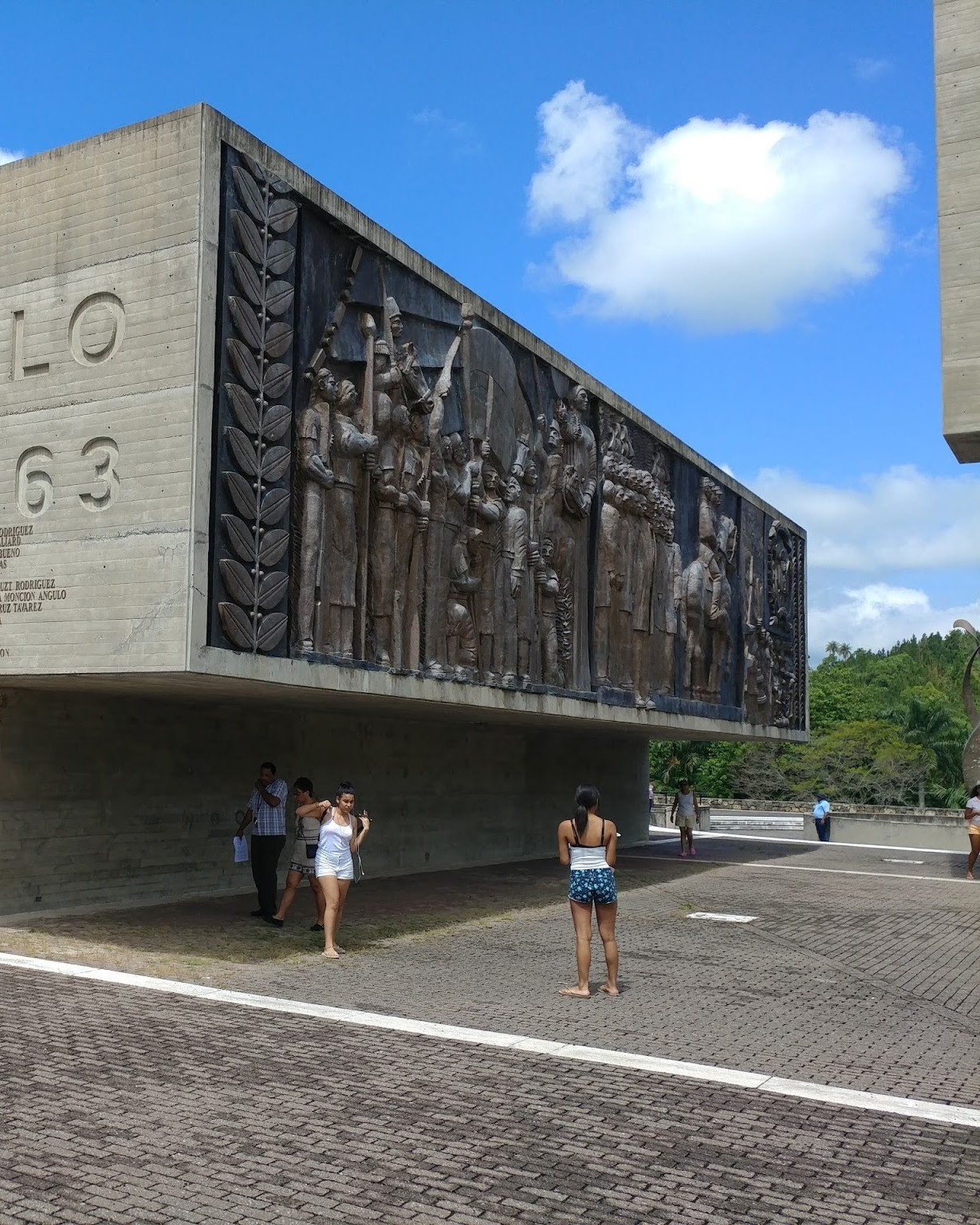
- Dajabon, Dominican Republic provincia monument

- Location of the Dajabón Province
- Country: Dominican Republic
- Province since: 1938
- Capital: Dajabón

Government
  - Type: Subdivisions
  - Body: 5 municipalities 4 municipal districts
  - Congresspersons: 1 Senator; 2 Deputies

Area
  - Total: 1,020.73 km^{2} (394.11 sq mi)

Population (2014)
  - Total: 87,274
  - Density: 85.502/km^{2} (221.45/sq mi)
- Time zone: UTC-4 (EST)
- Area code: 1-809 1-829 1-849
- ISO 3166-2: DO-05
- Postal Code: 63000

Dajabón (Spanish pronunciation: [daxaˈβon]) is a northwestern province which currently comprises one of the 32 provinces of the Dominican Republic. It is divided into 5 municipalities and its capital city with the same name. It is bordered by the provinces of Monte Cristi to the north, Santiago Rodríguez to the south, Elías Piña to the south and the Nord-Est department of Haiti to the west.

It was split from Monte Cristi in 1938, and was called Libertador until 1961.

== Location ==
It is located in the northwestern part of the country, and is surrounded by the provinces Monte Cristi (north), Santiago Rodríguez (east) and Elías Piña (south). To the west, Dajabón borders the Republic of Haiti.

== Origin of name ==
The province takes its name from the Taíno name of the region, Dahaboon; it was also the name of the main river of the region (the Dajabón River).

== Municipalities and municipal districts ==
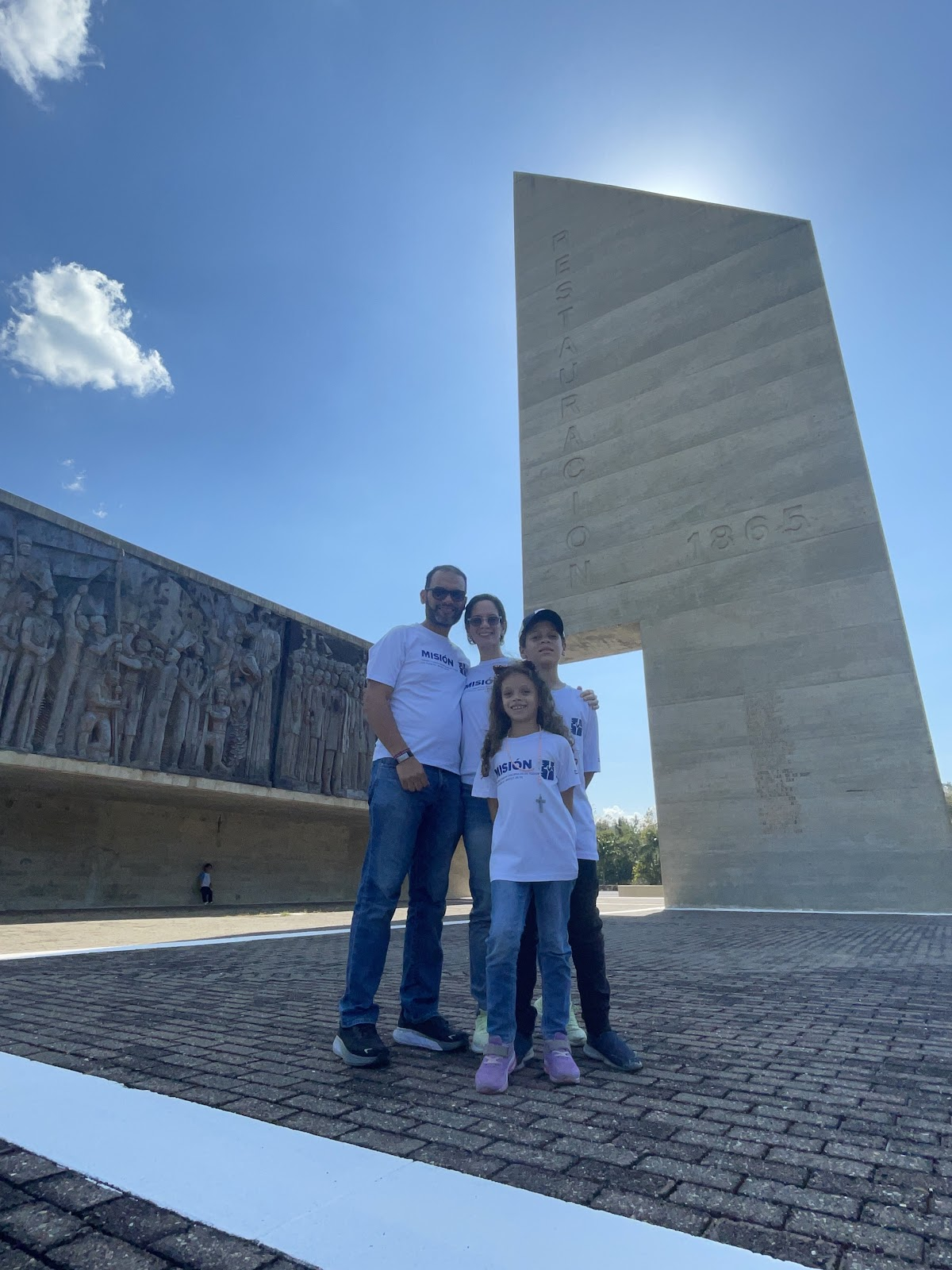
Dajabon, Dominican Republic monument

The province as of June 20, 2006 is divided into the following municipalities (municipios) and municipal districts (distrito municipal - D.M.) within them:

- Dajabón
  - Cañongo (D.M.)
- El Pino
  - Manuel Bueno (D.M.)
- Loma de Cabrera
  - Capotillo (D.M.)
  - Santiago de la Cruz (D.M.)
- Partido
- Restauración

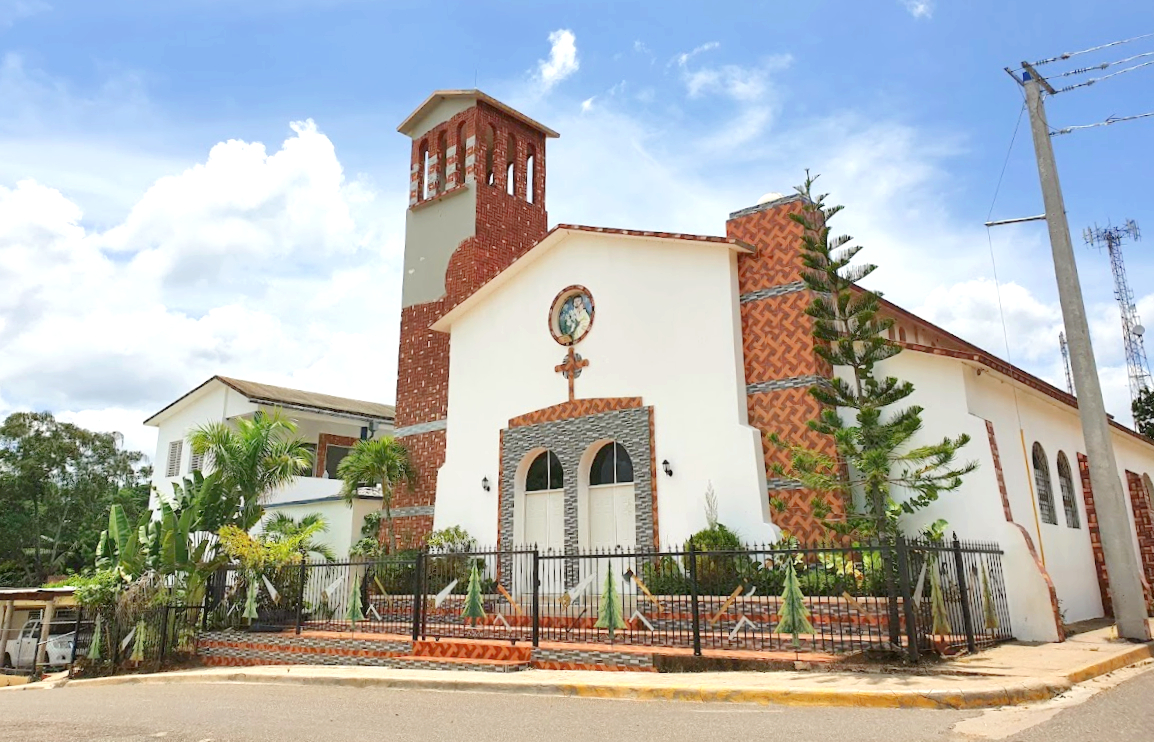
Dajabon Dominican Republic provincial town of Restauracion

The following is a sortable table of the municipalities and municipal districts with population figures as of the 2014 estimate. Urban population are those living in the seats (cabeceras literally heads) of municipalities or of municipal districts. Rural population are those living in the districts (Secciones literally sections) and neighborhoods (Parajes literally places) outside them. The population figures are from the 2014 population estimate.

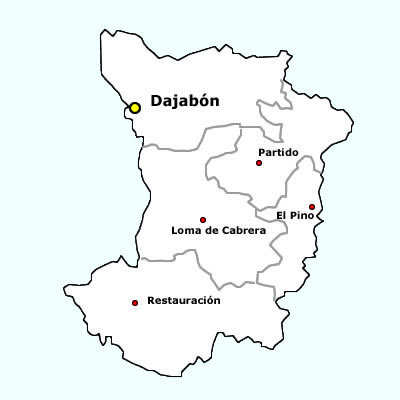
Municipalities of Dajabón Province

| Municipality | Total population | Urban population | Rural population |
|---|---|---|---|
| Dajabón | 40,687 | 31,146 | 9,541 |
| El Pino | 7,212 | 1,689 | 5,523 |
| Loma de Cabrera | 23,211 | 4,852 | 18,359 |
| Partido | 7,952 | 3,211 | 4,741 |
| Restauración | 8,212 | 3,715 | 4,497 |
| Dajabón province | 87,274 | 44,613 | 42,661 |

== Geography ==
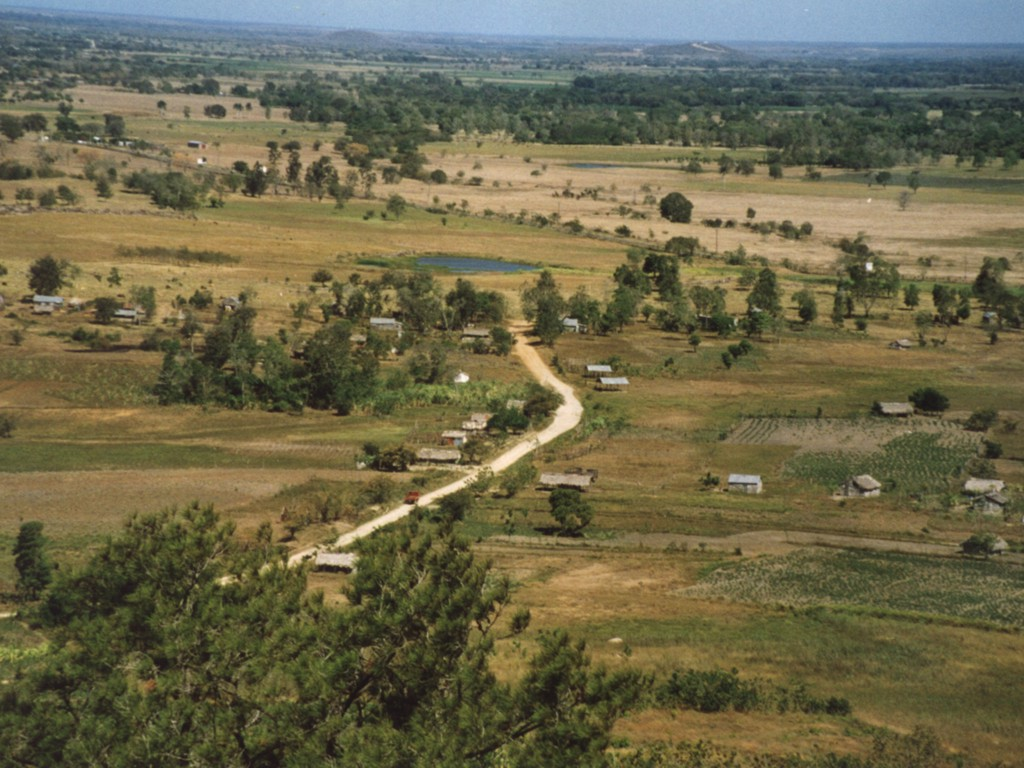
Landscape of Dajabón

The Cordillera Central ("Central mountain chain") is found in the southern part of the province. The northern part is flat, with many savannas; it is part of the Yaque del Norte Valley (or Línea Noroeste).

=== Rivers ===
The only important river in the province is the Dajabón River, also known as Masacre (from French Massacre). This river marks the Dominican-Haitian border from the city of Dajabón to its mouth. Other rivers are very short and they are tributaries of the Dajabon or the Artibonite rivers.

=== Climate ===
The climate of the province is a tropical climate, hot most of the year, but it is cooler on the mountains.

== Economy ==
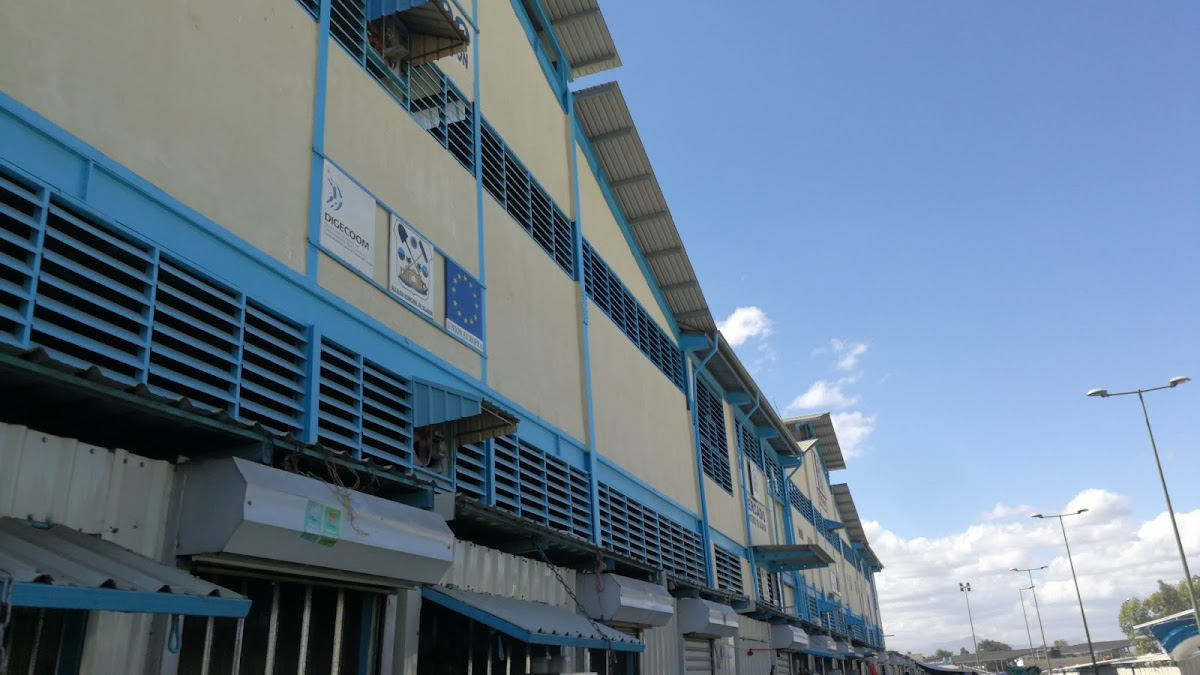
Dominican Republic border market in Dajabon

As in all border provinces in the Dominican Republic, there is little economic development. The trade with Haiti is important, mostly in the city of Dajabón. On the mountains, production of coffee and beans is an important activity. Rice and banana are produced in the northern part of the province, and cattle raising is important in the savannas around the city of Dajabón.

== Popular culture ==
Dajabon is the reputed birthplace of famed Latin American singer Angela Carrasco, although she claims to have been born in Santo Domingo.
