= Centro de Promocion y Solidaridad Humana =

HIV/AIDS prevention organisation

CEPROSH (Centro de Promoción y Solidaridad Humana) has its headquarters based in the Puerto Plata region of the Dominican Republic.

The Centro de Promoción y Solidaridad Humana (CEPROSH) is a private, non-profit HIV-related services organization that is based in Puerto Plata in the Dominican Republic, with other offices in the Dajabón and Monte Cristi provinces. Founded initially in 1987 as the Comité de Vigilancia y Control del SIDA, their main mission was to promote education surrounding the spread of HIV/AIDS and other STIs in the Dominican Republic. In 1996, the organization rebranded to its current name, whilst also developing a more expansive mission to guide their approaches. CEPROSH offers psychological support, HIV screenings, consultations, prEP, and other HIV/AIDS and STI services.

== Working with vulnerable populations ==
The Dominican Republic has an estimated 0.9% HIV prevalence rate amongst its general population, whereas percentages amongst various subpopulations are found to be greater. For sex workers, the HIV prevalence rate is at an estimated 4.2%, it is 4% amongst men who have sex with men, it is 27.7% amongst transgender people, and estimated to be the highest amongst residents of bateyes. These are some populations CEPROSH designates as "vulnerable populations" because they are at high-risk for contracting HIV as a result of stigma, poverty, lack of educational materials, cultural barriers, and their jobs. A key component of CEPROSH's HIV awareness and prevention work involves targeting these vulnerable communities, providing them with the resources and support they need to living safer, healthier lives.

CEPROSH has worked extensively, and intimately amongst these vulnerable populations, implementing programs that cater to the social circumstances that characterize their experiences. For instance, beginning in 2016, under the leadership of CEPROSH, a program titled Everyone deserves to live free from violence! was implemented. This intervention sought to cultivate a combined response to the concurrent crises of gender-based violence and HIV in the Dominican Republic, finding that individuals who belonged to populations at high-risk for HIV had also been victims of or at risk for gendered violence. This programming involved an arsenal of holistic approaches including the dissemination of educational materials that were created with the direction and feedback from members in these vulnerable populations, hiring and training peer educators who would directly conduct outreach at designated key locations, and holding empowerment sessions for individuals from vulnerable communities and people living with HIV/AIDS.

In another campaign led by CEPROSH and another HIV awareness and prevention organization by the name of COIN (Centro de Orientación e Investigación Integral), service workers aimed to adapt the successful Thai 100% condom program to fit the needs and conditions of sex workers in the Dominican Republic. This intervention relied on five main components: holding collective workshops for sex workers, the owners of the establishments where sex workers meet clients, and other employees to forge a shared commitment to supporting safe-sex practices amongst sex workers and clients, encouraging establishments to display educational materials about safe-sex and make condoms widely available, training local clinicians and inspectors in the areas of HIV/AIDS awareness and prevention, ensuring that establishment owners are proactively engaging in ensuring that safe-sex protocols are followed, and facilitating the enforcement of regional government policy surrounding condom-use to establishment owners through frequent visitations from NGO staff and public health officials, and a sanctioning process for those who failed to adhere to requirements.

== Social impact ==
CEPROSH's work with vulnerable communities has resulted in an increased access to HIV-related services, safer sexual practices, and changed attitudes towards and amongst sex workers, men who have sex with men, transgender people, and others who comprise the vulnerable populations that CEPROSH is oriented towards. Studies and personal accounts have reported that CEPROSH's community initiatives have created avenues for people to more willingly seek HIV/AIDS services, it has allowed for more comprehensive referral pathways for patients, more opportunities for community engagement in HIV awareness and prevention, regular condom use, increased exercising of agency amongst people of high-risk populations, and has fostered a feeling of genuine support amongst people within these vulnerable populations who have had often negative and neglectful experiences when seeking healthcare.

In a 2014 story written about CEPROSH and how they've tailored their services to meet the needs of trans people, a woman named Macarena Perez details her time being serviced by CEPROSH, saying "Here, I feel free, this is a place where you can feel free, because we can be the way we are and no one questions us, we are accepted, since they have qualified personnel and there is an environment of respect."
