= Hondo Valle =

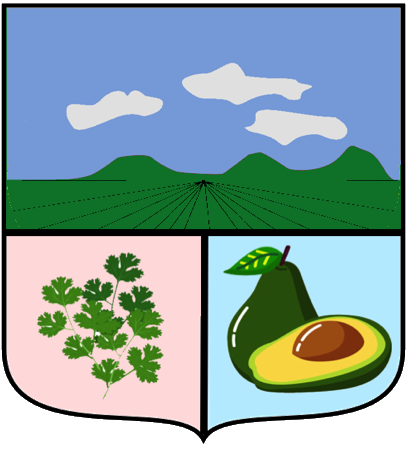
- Coat of arms

- Location within the Dominican Republic
- Coordinates: 18°43′12″N 71°42′0″W
- Country: Dominican Republic
- Province: Elías Piña
- Municipality since: 1978

Area
  - Total: 120.63 km^{2} (46.58 sq mi)
- Elevation: 890 m (2,920 ft)

Population (2012)
  - Total: 5,989
  - Density: 49.65/km^{2} (128.6/sq mi)
- Distance to – Comendador: 36 km
- Municipalities: 1

Hondo Valle is a town in the Elías Piña province of the Dominican Republic characterized by its beautiful mountains and cold climate.

== History ==
Through the Law No. 916 of August 12, 1978, the Municipal District of Hondo Valle, Municipality of Comendador, was erected in municipality, being integrated by the sections Aniceto Martinez, Juan de la Cruz, Sabana de la Loma, Los Guineos, Juan Santiago, Monte Mayor, Rancho de la Guardia and Rancho de Pedro.

When Francisco del Rosario Sanchez launched his invasion of The Dominican Republic with the intention of overthrowing Pedro Santana and expelling his country from Spanish jurisdiction, he entered through this city from the Haitian side.

== Population ==
According to the national Census of 2002, the municipality has a total population of 10,647, of which 5,538 were men and 5,109 were women. The urban population of the municipality was 35.24%.

== Economy ==
The main economic activity of the municipality is agriculture and some livestock, tourism and trade with Haiti.

== Climate ==
Climate data for Hondo Valle (1961–1990)
Month	Jan	Feb	Mar	Apr	May	Jun	Jul	Aug	Sep	Oct	Nov	Dec	Year
Record high °C (°F)	32.0 (89.6)	32.6 (90.7)	35.0 (95.0)	35.0 (95.0)	34.4 (93.9)	34.5 (94.1)	34.9 (94.8)	35.2 (95.4)	34.0 (93.2)	35.0 (95.0)	32.7 (90.9)	31.4 (88.5)	35.2 (95.4)
Mean daily maximum °C (°F)	27.5 (81.5)	28.1 (82.6)	28.8 (83.8)	29.0 (84.2)	29.0 (84.2)	29.7 (85.5)	30.2 (86.4)	30.0 (86.0)	29.4 (84.9)	28.7 (83.7)	27.7 (81.9)	26.9 (80.4)	28.8 (83.8)
Mean daily minimum °C (°F)	11.0 (51.8)	11.4 (52.5)	12.6 (54.7)	14.0 (57.2)	14.9 (58.8)	15.2 (59.4)	15.0 (59.0)	15.0 (59.0)	15.0 (59.0)	14.7 (58.5)	13.4 (56.1)	11.6 (52.9)	13.7 (56.7)
Record low °C (°F)	2.0 (35.6)	3.0 (37.4)	4.0 (39.2)	6.0 (42.8)	9.0 (48.2)	10.0 (50.0)	10.0 (50.0)	5.9 (42.6)	5.9 (42.6)	7.0 (44.6)	6.1 (43.0)	6.0 (42.8)	2.0 (35.6)
Average rainfall mm (inches)	15.8 (0.62)	24.2 (0.95)	68.7 (2.70)	159.9 (6.30)	254.3 (10.01)	116.9 (4.60)	122.5 (4.82)	210.3 (8.28)	237.5 (9.35)	214.7 (8.45)	85.5 (3.37)	22.9 (0.90)	1,533.2 (60.36)
Average rainy days (≥ 1.0 mm)	2.0	2.5	5.1	10.5	14.9	9.1	9.4	13.4	15.1	14.9	7.0	2.5	106.4
Source: NOAA

== Sources ==
- – World-Gazetteer.com
