= El Pino, Dominican Republic =

El Pino
- Coordinates: 19°26′N 71°28.5′W
- Country: Dominican Republic
- Province: Dajabón

Area
  - Total: 88.35 km^{2} (34.11 sq mi)

Population (2012)
  - Total: 6,698
  - Density: 75.81/km^{2} (196.4/sq mi)

El Pino is a community located on the Dajabón Province of the Dominican Republic. The most known and inhabited sector is el Sector Los Ramos, where the extensive Rodriguez-Ramos family and their descendents live.
