= Guayamouc River =

Coordinates: 18.98°N 71.86°W

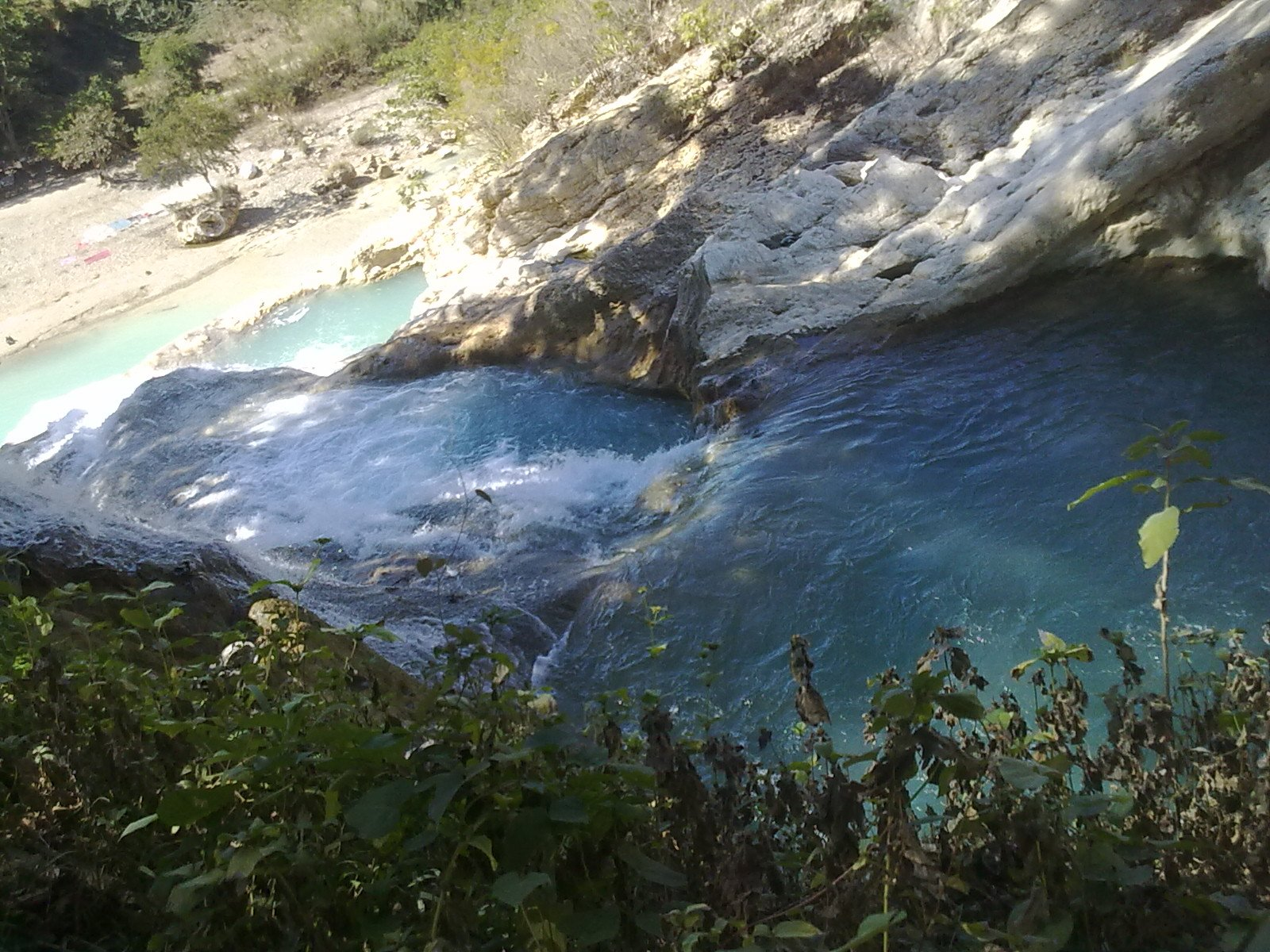

Location
- Country: Haiti

Physical characteristics
- Length: 113 km (70 mi)

The Guayamouc River, (French: Rivière Guayamouc), is a river in central and eastern Haiti. It rises on the Massif du Nord and flows generally southeast for 113 km into the Artibonite River at the border with the Dominican Republic. It is notable for producing the fertile plain of central Haiti. Notable cities on the Guayamouc include Hinche.
