= Elías Piña Province =

Province of the Dominican Republic

Elías Piña
- Province
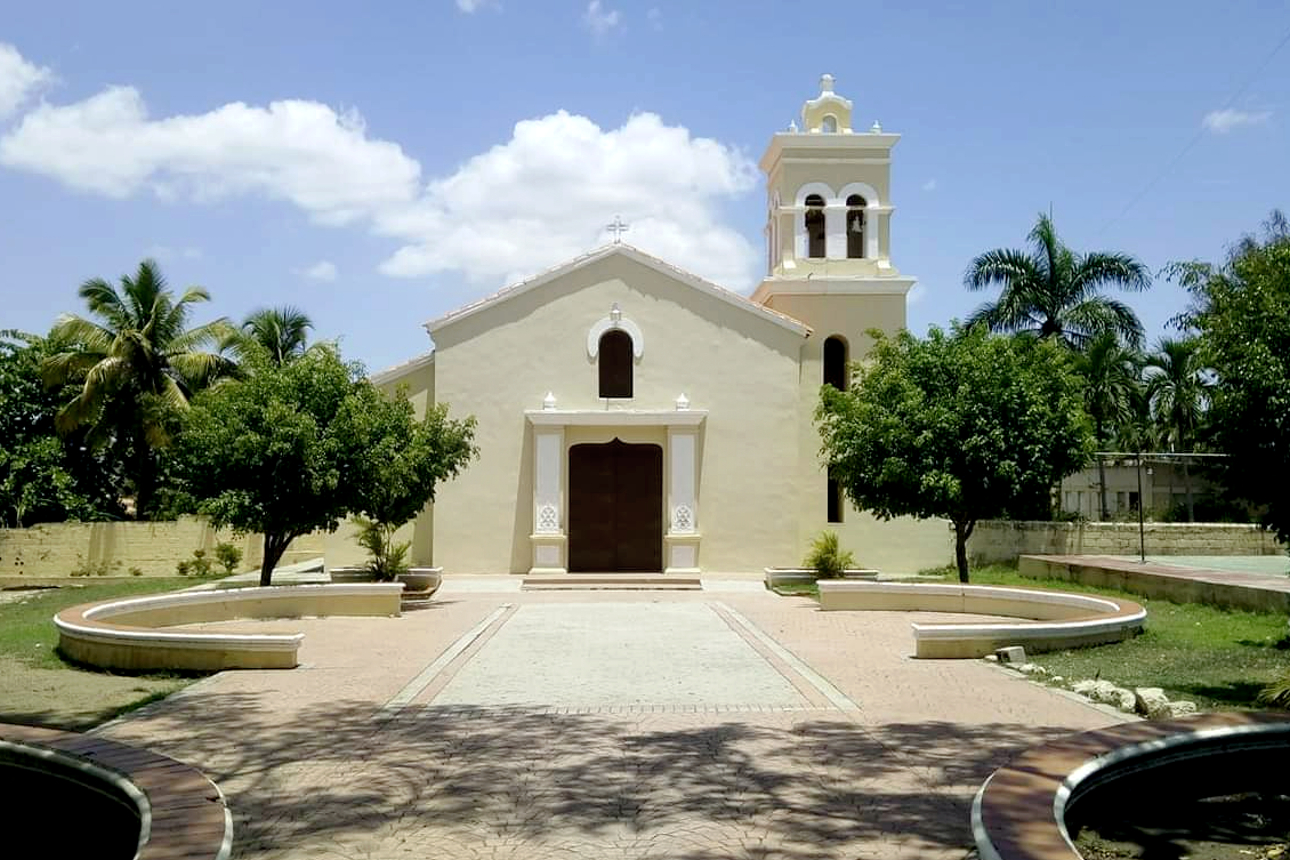
- Church in the town of Comendador, Elias Pina, Dominican Republic

- Location of the Elías Piña Province
- Country: Dominican Republic
- Province since: 1942
- Capital: Comendador

Government
  - Type: Subdivisions
  - Body: 6 municipalities 7 municipal districts
  - Congresspersons: 1 Senator; 2 Deputies

Area
  - Total: 1,426.20 km^{2} (550.66 sq mi)

Population (2014)
  - Total: 84,632
  - Density: 59.341/km^{2} (153.69/sq mi)
- Time zone: UTC-4 (EST)
- Area code: 1-809 1-829 1-849
- ISO 3166-2: DO-07
- Postal Code: 73000

Elías Piña (Spanish pronunciation: [eˈli.as ˈpiɲa]) is one of the 32 provinces of the Dominican Republic, located in the westernmost part of the country, along the border with Haiti. It is divided into 6 municipalities and its capital city is Comendador. The Cordillera Central ("Central mountain chain") is found in the northern part of the province, and the Sierra de Neiba runs across the southern half. Between those two mountain ranges, there are several valleys formed by the Artibonite River and its tributaries.

It was created on 1942 with the name San Rafael. In 1965, its name was changed to Estrelleta and, finally, in 1972 it got its current name. It was a municipio of the San Juan province before being elevated to the category of province.

== Location ==
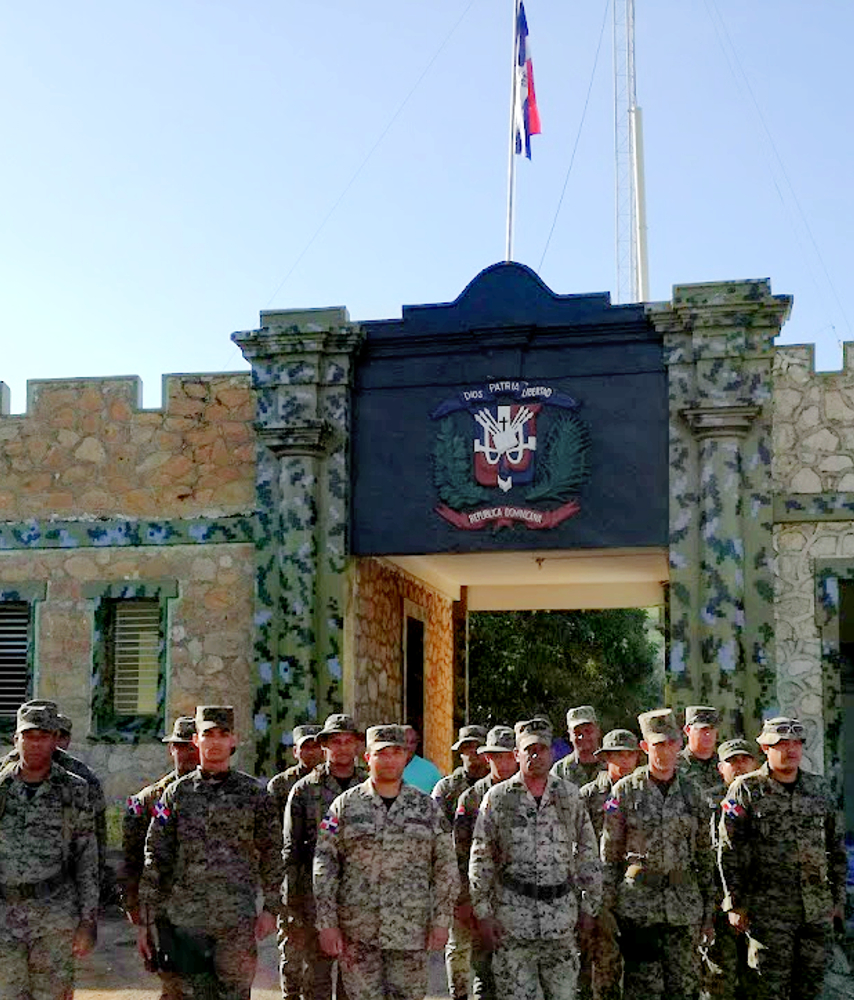
Elias Pina Dominican Republic military in the border

Elías Piña is a landlocked province in the central mountainous region of Hispaniola. The province is bordered by the Dajabón and Santiago Rodríguez provinces to the north, the San Juan province to the east, the Independencia province to the south and the Republic of Haiti to the west.

== History ==
The region occupied by the current Elías Piña province was sparsely populated. The main settlement founded during the early colonial era was Bánica, at the eastern end of the Ocean, an area of extensive savannas. The town was founded in 1504 by the Spanish conquistador Diego Velázquez on the left side of the River Artibonite. It was an important town in those years but later it lost its importance. In the 18th century, the Spanish government moved the city to its present place, away from the river, and brought families from the Canary Islands to live there.

The towns of Comendador and Hondo Valle originated from border military posts established after national independence. All the rest of the current province was practically depopulated until after the Restoration War when families from other parts of the country began to arrive. During the Dominican-Haitian War (1844–1856), Haitian troops crossed this region, which led to several battles, including the confrontations to dominate the Cachimán fort and, especially, the Battle of La Estrelleta.

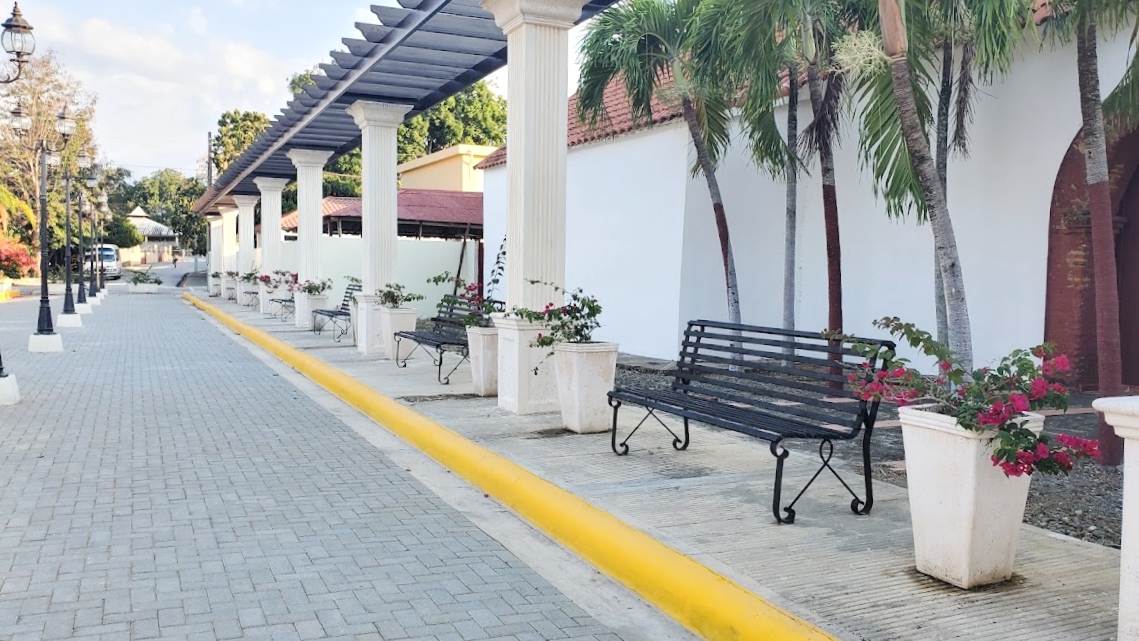
Banica, Dominican Republic Park area

After the Independence in 1844, the town was elevated by the Dominican government to the category of municipality of the Azua province, but again the town was abandoned by its inhabitants. After the "Restoration War" (1863–1865), some families from other towns close to the Haitian border came to live in Bánica. The town of Bánica was the first place where Dominican President Rafael Trujillo implemented his campaign against the Haitians, later known as the Parsley Massacre.

The territory belonged to the province of Azua until it became part of the province of Benefactor (now San Juan) when said province was created in 1938. In 1942, in accordance with dictator Rafael Trujillo's plans for "Dominicanization of the border", the province of San Rafael was split off from Benefactor. The province was renamed La Estrelleta in 1965 in honor of the Battle of La Estrelleta. It was renamed again in 1972 to its current name, Elías Piña.

=== Origin of name ===
Colonel Elías Piña was an officer of the Dominican army during the Dominican War of Independence. He was born in La Margarita, close to Comendador and died in 1845 when he was attacking a fortified position in Bánica.

== Municipalities ==
In the province, there are six municipalities (municipios) and seven municipal districts (distrito municipal) within them. The municipalities and its municipal districts (M.D.) are:

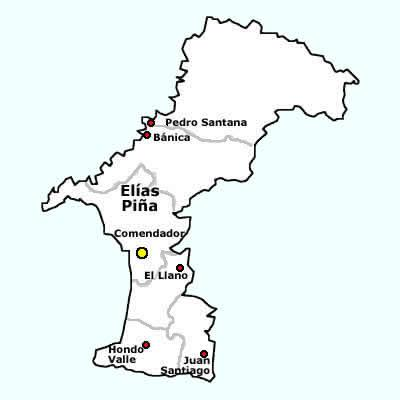
Municipios and Municipal Distritos

- Comendador, head municipality of the province
  - Guayabo (M.D.)
  - Sabana Larga (M.D.)
- Bánica
  - Sabana Cruz (M.D.)
  - Sabana Higüero (M.D.)
- El Llano
  - Guanito (M.D.)
- Hondo Valle
  - Rancho de la Guardia (M.D.)
- Juan Santiago
- Pedro Santana
  - Río Limpio (M.D.)

== Population ==
The following is a sortable table of the municipalities and municipal districts with population figures as of the 2014 estimate. Urban population are those living in the seats (cabeceras literally heads) of municipalities or of municipal districts. Rural population are those living in the districts (Secciones literally sections) and neighborhoods (Parajes literally places) outside them. The population figures are from the 2014 population estimate.

Name	Total population	Urban population	Rural population
Comendador	43,671	33,459	10,212
El Llano	7,923	1,524	6,399
Hondo Valle	12,200	4,158	8,042
Juan Santiago	5,023	1,652	3,371
Pedro Santana	7,993	4,125	3,868
San Francisco de Bánica	7,822	1,784	6,038
Elías Piña province	84,632	46,702	37,930

== Geography ==
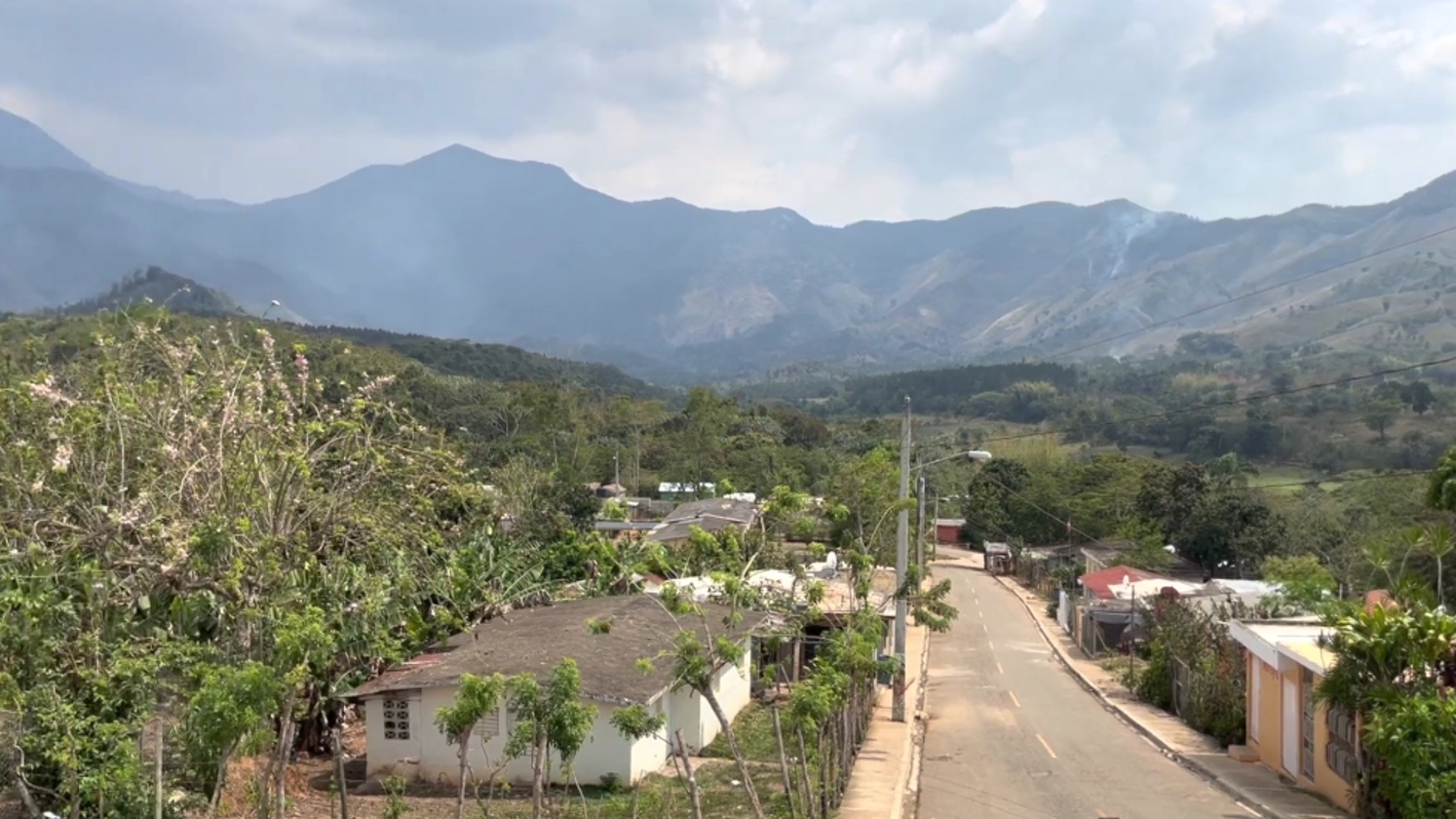
Landscape in rural countryside Elias Pina province

The province can be divided into three large physiographic regions: the Sierra de Neiba to the south, the Cordillera Central to the north, and the central part, part of the Artibonite basin and its tributaries. This central part consists of small valleys separated by low hills. The highest mountain is the La Tasajera del Chivito, with 2179 m, on the northern slope of the Sierra de Neiba.

== Climate ==
The climate of the province is a tropical climate, hot most of the year, but it is cooler on the mountains.

== Rivers ==
The main river is the Artibonite that, in some places, marks the Dominican-Haitian border. Other rivers are Macasías, Tocino, Joca and Vallecito, all of them tributaries of the Artibonite.

== Economy ==
As in all border provinces in the Dominican Republic, there is little economic development. The trade with Haiti is important, above all in Comendador. On the mountains, coffee and beans are important products. Potatoes are also produced in the south (Sierra de Neiba).
