= Libón River =

Coordinates: 19.332°N 71.787°W

Location
- Country: Dominican Republic, Haiti

The Libón River is a river in Hispaniola. It forms part of the international border between the Dominican Republic and Haiti. It is the source of the Artibonite River.

== See also ==
- List of rivers of the Dominican Republic
- List of rivers of Haiti
