= El Llano, Dominican Republic =

El Llano
- Location within the Dominican Republic
- Coordinates: 18°49′12″N 71°37′48″W
- Country: Dominican Republic
- Province: Elías Piña
- Municipality since: 1974

Area
  - Total: 104.49 km^{2} (40.34 sq mi)

Population (2012)
  - Total: 4,986
  - Density: 47.72/km^{2} (123.6/sq mi)
- Distance to – Comendador: 13 km
- Municipalities: 1

El Llano, Dominican Republic (in English, The Plain) is a Dominican municipality in the Elías Piña province.

== Population ==
The municipality had, in 2002, a total population of 8,151: 4,376 men and 3,775 women. The urban population was 30.23% of the total population.

== History ==
El Llano was elevated to the category of municipality by the law 3208 of 2 July 1974. Before that date, it was part of Comendador.

== Economy ==
The main economic activity of the municipality is agriculture.
