= Dajabón River =

River of the Dominican Republic and Haiti

Dajabón River Massacre River
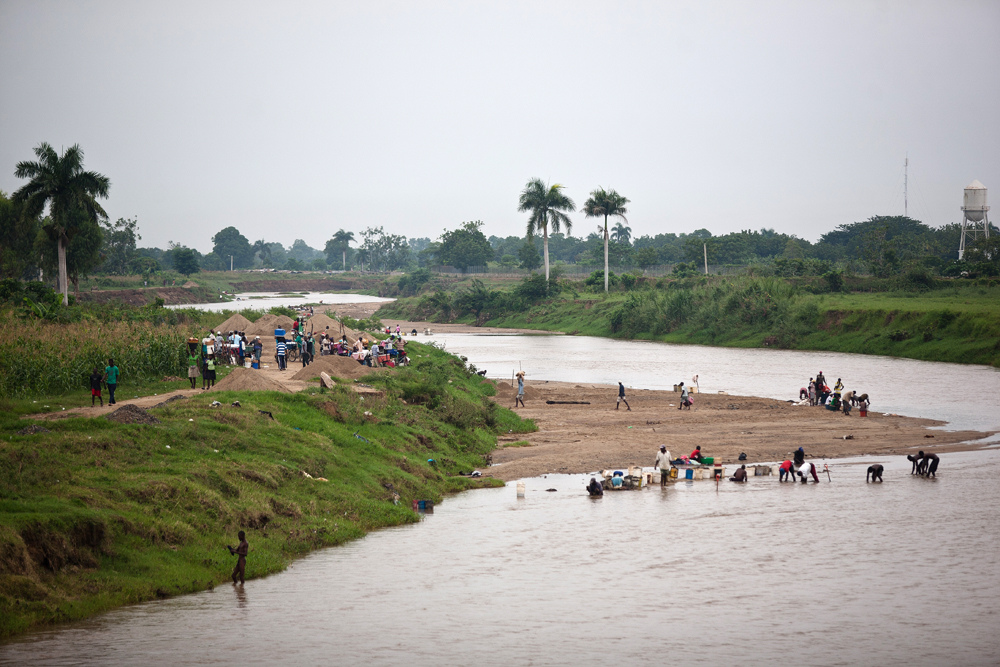

- Location of mouth

Location
- Countries: Dominican Republic and Haiti

Physical characteristics
- Mouth: Atlantic Ocean
  - coordinates: 19°42′07″N 71°45′31″W
  - elevation: Sea level

The Dajabón River (also called Massacre River) (French: Rivière du Massacre; Spanish: río Dajabón) is a river which forms the northernmost part of the international border between the Dominican Republic and Haiti.

== Etymology ==
The river was named by the Arawak-speaking indigenous inhabitants of the island, the Taínos, as "Dahabōn", which derivates from dajaus, a freshwater fish that lives in the Caribbean region.

The French version of the river, "Rivière du Massacre" (River of Massacre), refers to a battle in 1728 where Spanish settlers killed thirty French buccaneers near the river. This name became popular after being the site of many killings during the Parsley Massacre—though the event was not, contrary to popular belief, the origin of its name.

== Geography ==
It has its source in the Central Cordillera at Pico de Gallo mountain in the Dominican Republic. Further downstream through the Dominican province of Dajabón until it reaches the border between the Dominican Republic and Haiti, then it runs along the Haitian department of Northeast (left bank) and the Dominican provinces of Dajabón and Monte Cristi (right bank), then flows into Bay of Manzanillo and into the Atlantic Ocean west of the Dominican town of Pepillo Salcedo. It has a length of 55 kilometers of which a little more than 7 km are shared with Haiti. The Dominican town of Dajabón faces the Haitian town of Ouanaminthe.

In recent years it has lost its flow due to environmentally unsustainable practices, in particular the destruction of the forest due to massive felling without subsequent reforestation, and the practice of indiscriminately removing sand from the bed of the channel without any technical criteria.

== History ==
In 2023, a dispute over water in the Dajabon River led the Dominican President Luis Abinader to close the border with Haiti. In 2024, disputes continue between the two countries over the use and management of the Massacre River's water resources. Issues such as border delimitation, river navigation and environmental preservation have exacerbated these tensions.

== See also ==
- List of rivers of the Dominican Republic
- Geography of the Dominican Republic
