= Juan Santiago, Dominican Republic =

Juan Santiago
- Location within the Dominican Republic
- Coordinates: 18°42′0″N 71°34′48″W
- Country: Dominican Republic
- Province: Elías Piña
- Established as a Municipality: May 9, 2005

Area
  - Total: 107.15 km^{2} (41.37 sq mi)

Population (2012)
  - Total: 2,989
  - Density: 27.90/km^{2} (72.25/sq mi)
  - Urban: 1,104
- Distance to – Comendador: 46 km
- Municipalities: 0

Juan Santiago is a Dominican municipality in the Elías Piña province.

== History ==
Juan Santiago was elevated to the category of municipal district of Comendador by the law 916 of 12 August 1978. Then it was elevated to the category of municipality.

== Economy ==
The main economic activity of the municipality is agriculture.
