= Dominican Republic–Haiti border =

International border

Map of Hispaniola showing the border between the Dominican Republic and Haiti

The Dominican Republic–Haiti border is an international border between the Dominican Republic and the Republic of Haiti on the island of Hispaniola. Extending from the Caribbean Sea in the south to the Atlantic Ocean in the north, the 391-kilometre (243 mi) border was agreed upon in the 1929 Dominican–Haitian border treaty.

The island was first formally divided in 1697 as part of the Peace of Ryswick, under which Spain ceded to France the western portion it had seized by force earlier in the century. In 1621, England made an unsuccessful attempt to take over both sides of the island. In the early 20th century, the United States occupied both countries, and made numerous changes to the border. The Dominican Republic comprises approximately the eastern two-thirds of the island and the Republic of Haiti the western third.

== Description ==
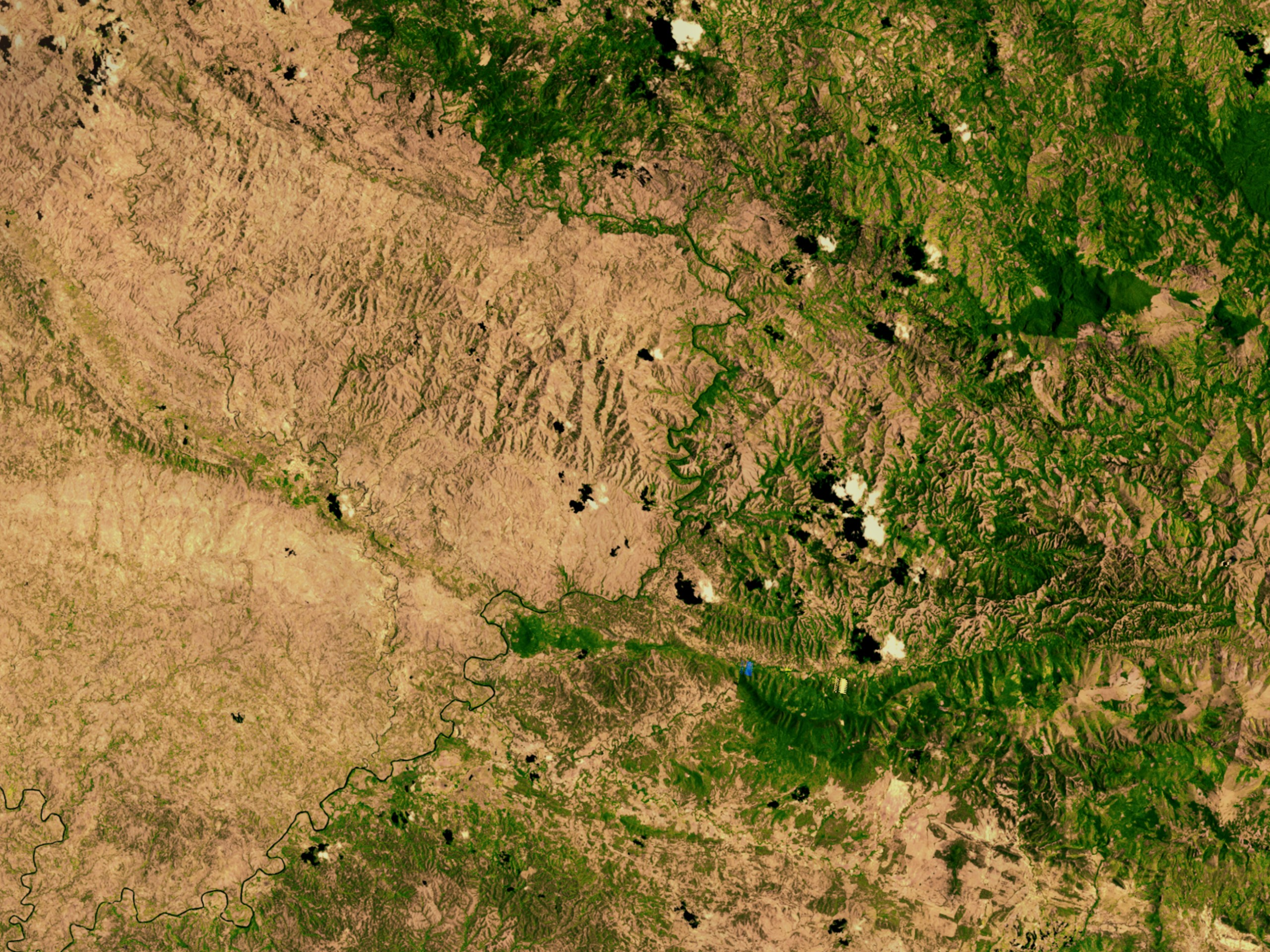
The border can be seen from space due to the extensive deforestation on the Haitian side

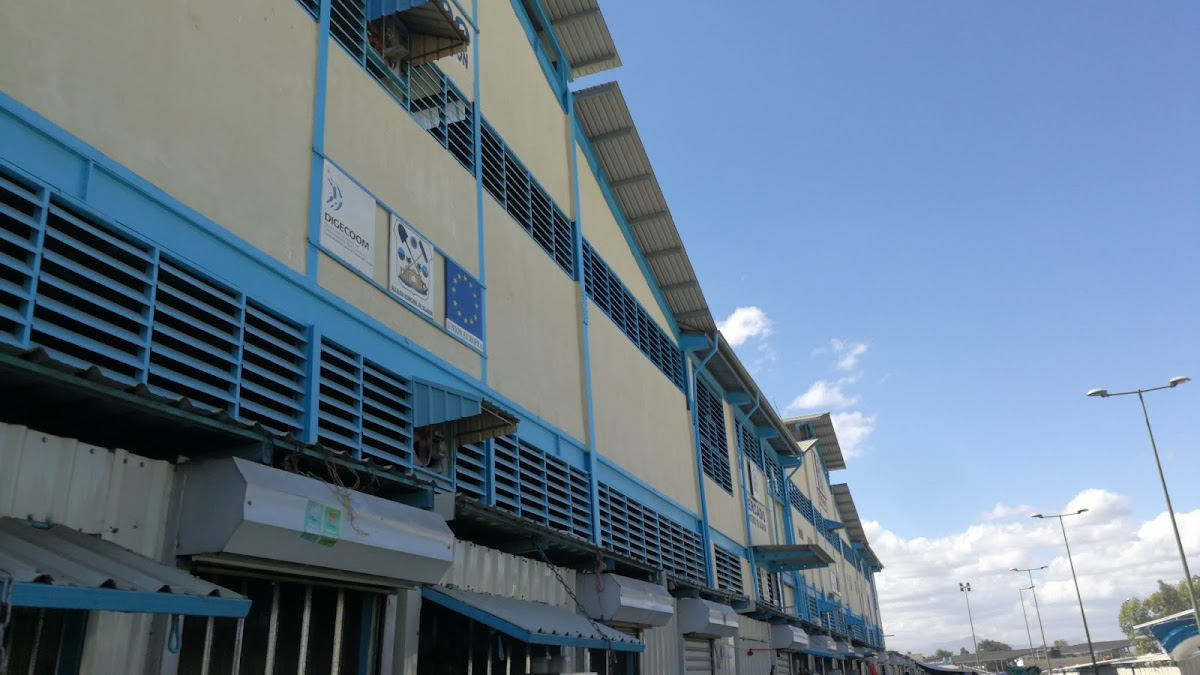
Dominican Republic border market in Dajabon.

The border starts in the north at the Boca del Río Dajabón where the Dajabón River (Rivière du Massacre) enters Manzanillo Bay, immediately west of the Dominican town of Pepillo Salcedo. The border then follows this river for a brief period southwards, before continuing southwards via a series of straight lines through the Laguna de Saladillo, rejoining the same river between Dajabón (DR) and Ouanaminthe (Haiti). The border then again follows the river southwards, where it is alternatively called the Río Capatillo/Bernar (Rivière de Capotille/Bernard), down to the Dominican village of Vara de Vaca. The border then proceeds overland to the west, turning sharply south-eastwards upon reaching the Libón River. It continues along the river down to the DR-45 road and then follows this road southwards for some distance through the mountains down to the Artibonite River. The border then follows the Artibonite to the south-west down to the confluence with the Macasía River, following this river eastwards. The border then proceeds overland south-eastwards and south via various straight-line segments, also briefly utilising the Rivière Carrizal. It then turns west in the vicinity of Granada, and then turns south-east to run parallel with the Étang Saumâtre lake, briefly cutting through it at one point. The border curves around the south-east corner of the lake before proceeding overland via straight lines to the south-east and then south-west, then utilising the Río Bonito southwards for a period, before eventually reaching the Pedernales river. It then follows this river southwards out to the Caribbean Sea.

== History ==
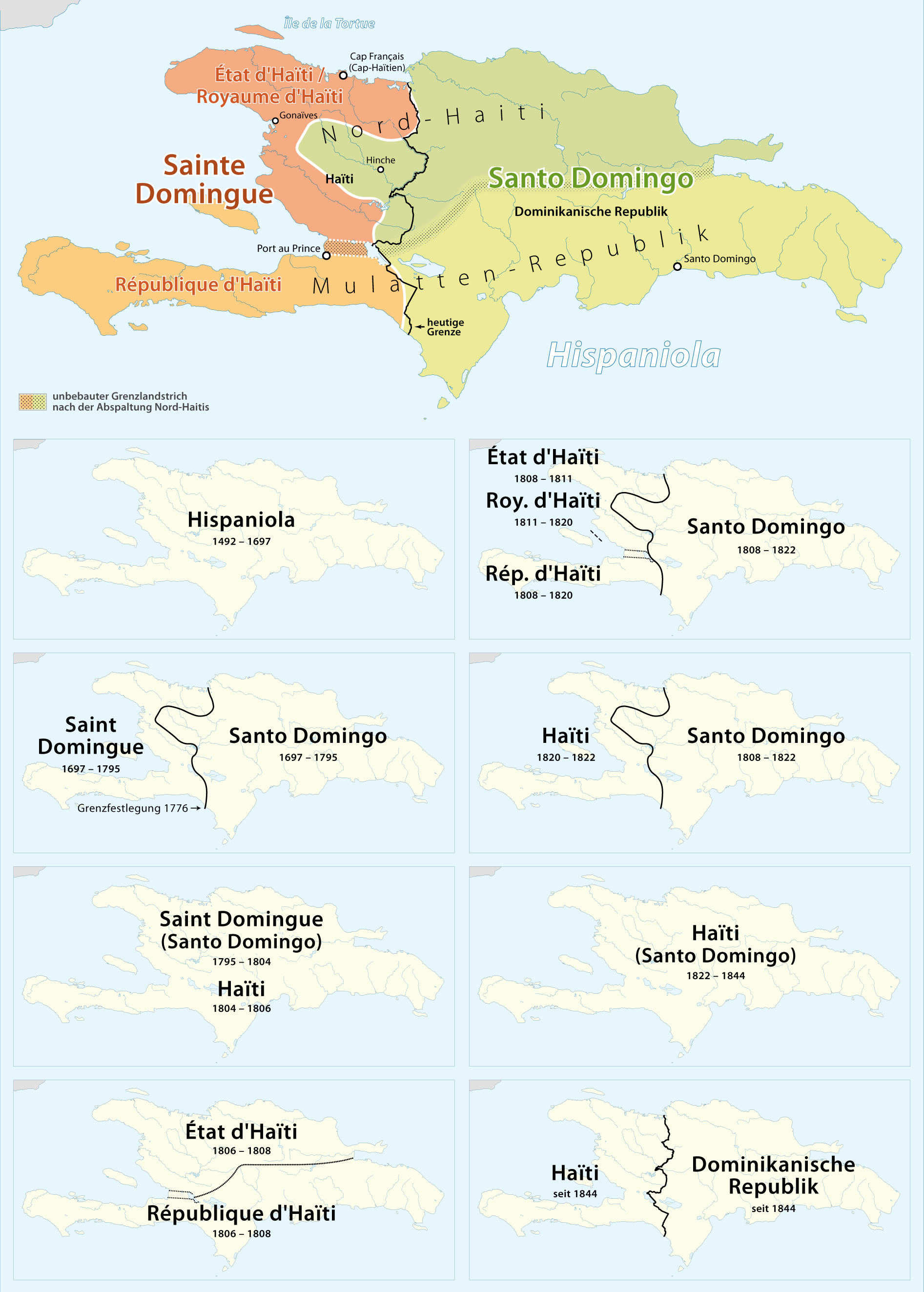
Map showing the shifting border on Hispaniola

The division of the island of Hispaniola dates to the 16th and 17th centuries, when the Spanish colonized the eastern part of the island and the French colonized the western part of the island. After decades of hostilities, mutual acknowledgement by France and Spain of their respective colonies, Saint-Domingue and Santo Domingo, was accomplished by way of the Peace of Ryswick in 1697. A more precise boundary was drawn in 1777 via the Treaty of Aranjuez. The distinction between the two parts of the island was accentuated by differing settlement patterns in the two colonies. Whereas the Spanish developed a settler-based society with limited slavery, the French forcibly settled thousands of African slaves in Saint Domingue, with the slave population coming to dominate demographically. In 1791 the Haitian slaves launched the Haitian Revolution, gaining independence from France in 1804 as the First Empire of Haiti. In 1821 the Dominicans declared independence from Spain; however, Haiti then invaded and annexed the colony. The Dominicans fought a war against the Haitians and gained independence in 1844, with the border being restored.

The poor relations between the two states were hampered by disputes over sections of the border, which was not finally delimited until 1929. A subsequent commission set about conducting on-the-ground demarcation; however, there were continuing disputes over certain sections of the boundary. These were allocated via a treaty signed on 27 February 1935, with a final border treaty being signed on 9 March 1936. Despite this, Dominican dictator Rafael Trujillo subsequently launched a wave of anti-Haitian violence in 1937, culminating in the Parsley massacre in which thousands of Haitians living in the DR were forced across the border or killed. Though relations since then have improved, the two countries remain deeply divided on demographic, political, racial, cultural and economic lines. Haiti's political situation is volatile, and the economy of the Dominican Republic is ten times larger than that of Haiti, prompting many Haitians to move to the DR seeking better opportunities, where they are often the subject of discrimination.

As of 2023, over 500,000 Haitians live in the Dominican Republic, which has a population of about 11 million. According to human rights activists, mistreatment of Haitians has increased under DR president Luis Abinader, who took office in August 2020. Observers said that a spike in deportations occurred in 2021, with more than 31,000 sent back to Haiti. Numerous anti-Haitian actions by the DR government were cited, including separation of children from their parents and deportation of pregnant women; racial profiling (Haitians are on average darker-skinned than Dominicans); suspension of Haitian student visas; requiring Haitian migrants to register their location; and prohibiting companies from hiring migrants for more than 20% of their workforce.

== Border wall ==
In February 2023, construction began on a border wall along 164 kilometres (102 mi) of the 392-kilometre (244 mi) border with Haiti. The 3.9-metre-high (13 ft) concrete wall is 20 centimeters thick, topped by a metal mesh, and contains fiber optics for communications, movement sensors, cameras, radar and drones, with 70 watchtowers and 41 access gates for patrolling. The $32 million project would, upon completion, be the second longest border wall in the Americas, after the US-Mexico wall.

Proposals for a wall came from several Dominican politicians, including Ramfis Trujillo, grandson of Dominican dictator Rafael Trujillo, and current president Luis Abinader, to reduce irregular migration and smuggling. Dominican officials claim the wall will slow the illegal drug trade and reduce the risk of gang violence in Haiti from spreading to the Dominican Republic. According to the government, the plan is supported by the majority of the Dominican population.

The project is controversial, with claims that it will do little to reduce illegal migration, encourage bribery of Dominican Republic soldiers, and become a source of conflict. The wall is being built in Dominican Republic territory, allowing DR soldiers to patrol on both sides. This has become a source of tension, arising from claims that the area on the Haiti-facing side is a no-man's-land, or has been ceded to Haiti by virtue of the wall.

== Water rights dispute and border closure ==
On September 15, 2023, a dispute over water rights in the Dajabón River (also called Massacre River) led the Dominican Republic to close the border. Construction by Haitian workers was underway on a canal intended to irrigate approximately 7,400 acres in Haiti's Maribaroux plain. Dominican officials claimed the canal project violates a 1929 treaty which states both countries may use the water but not alter the river's natural course. On October 11, the border was partially reopened to essential goods such as food and medicine, yet still closed for migrants. Abinader maintained the ban on issuing visas regardless of health, education, or work purposes. The United States Department of Agriculture reported that the Dominican Republic had lost $21 million in its agricultural trade with Haiti due to its border closure. Haiti is the Dominican Republic's second-largest export destination, with an annual profit of $430 to $566 million. Despite the reopening on the Dominican side of the border, the canal has become a movement, sparking Haitians to boycott Dominican goods. On October 30, 2023, the air border with Haiti was reopened.

== Settlements near the border ==
=== Dominican Republic ===
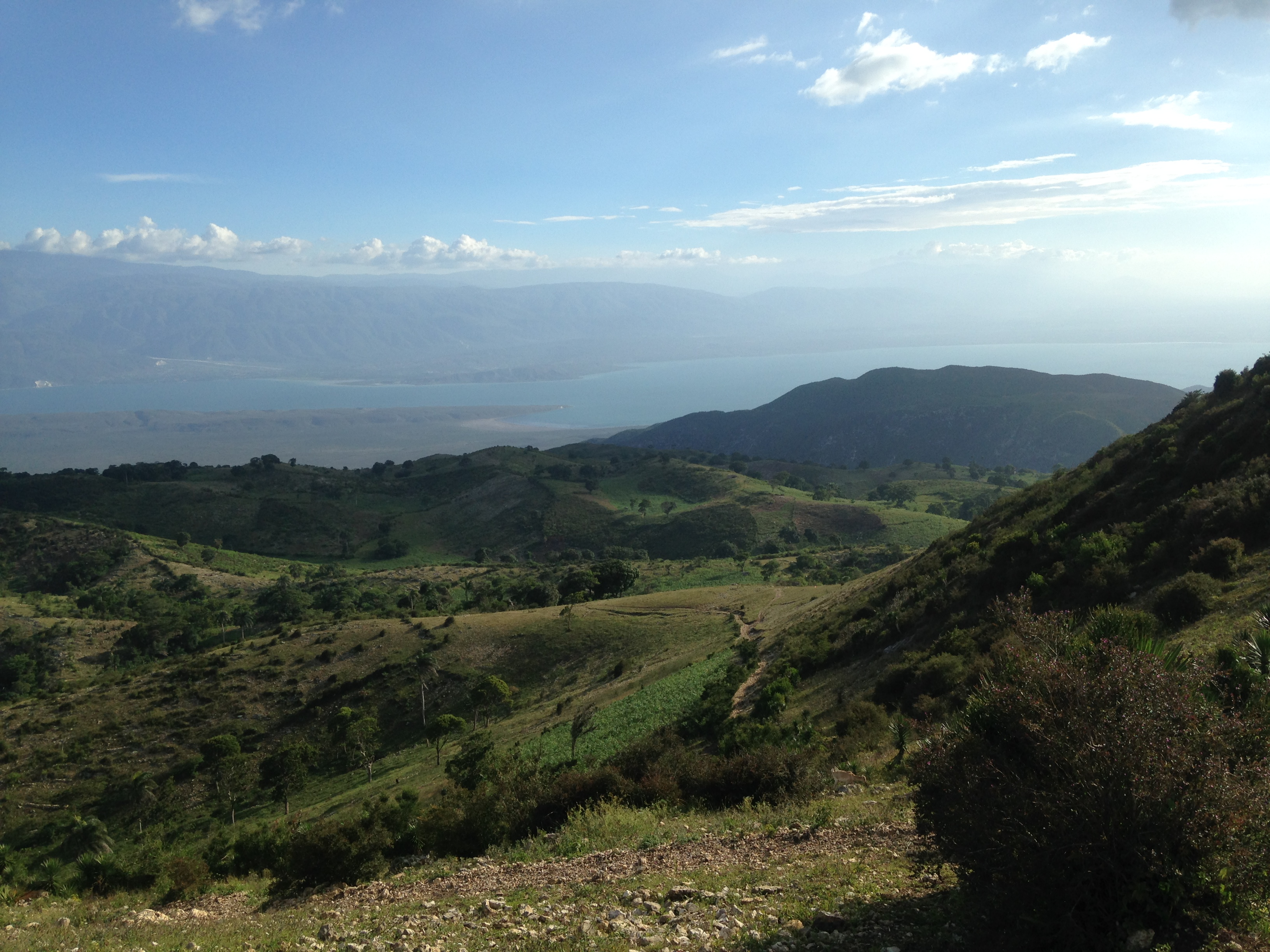
View of border region between Dominican Republic and Haiti. The border runs horizontally through the middle of the picture.

- Pepillo Salcedo
- Dajabón
- Pedro Santana
- Bánica
- Comendador
- Jimaní
- Pedernales

=== Haiti ===
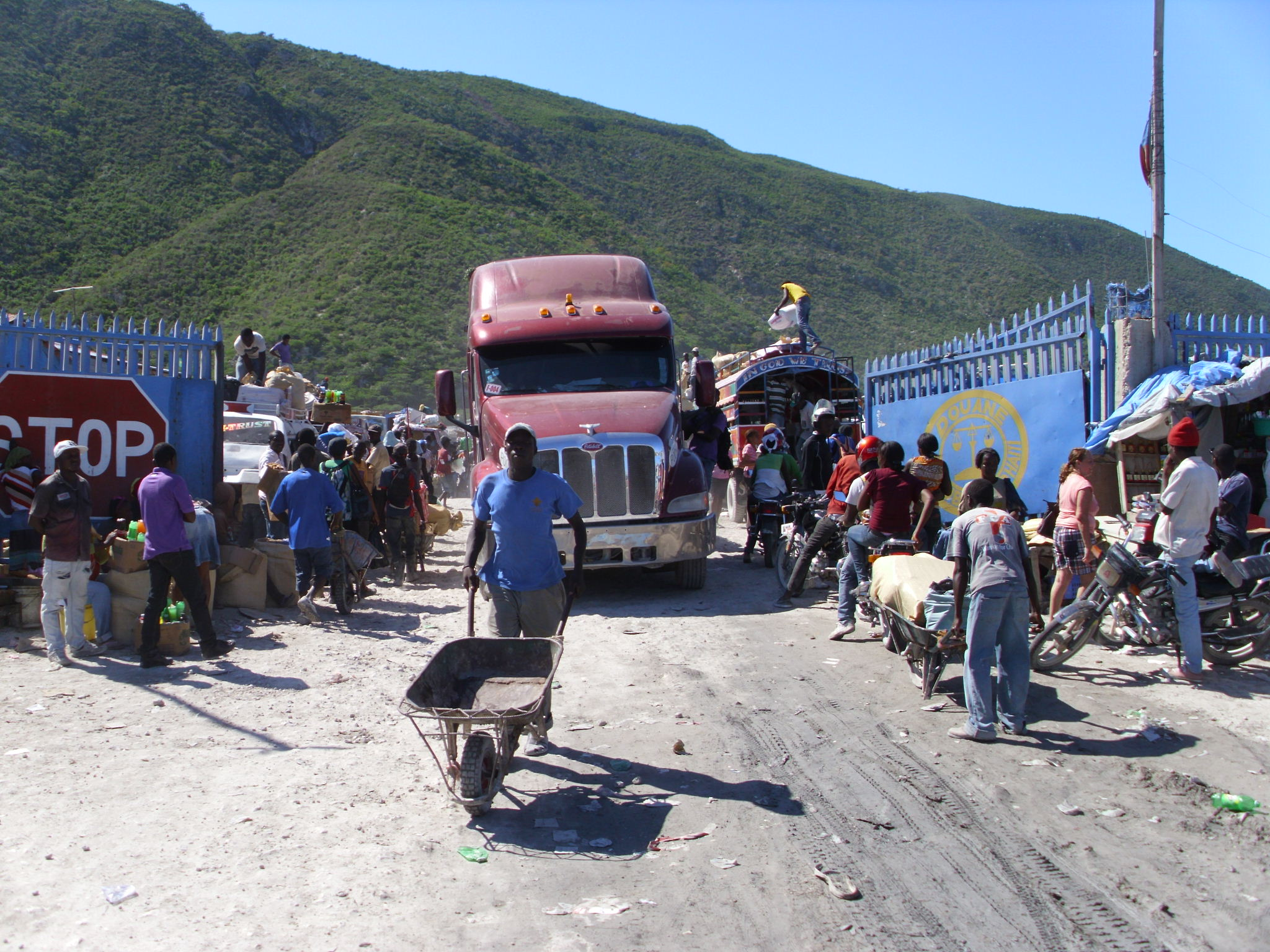
The border at Jimaní

- Nan Contrée
- Capotille
- Ouanaminthe
- Parc Dubois
- Malpasse
- Belladère
- Fonds-Verrettes
- Banane
- Anse-à-Pitres

== Border crossings ==
There are four official crossing points and many more unofficial ones. The four official crossing points are: Malpasse-Jimaní, Ouanaminthe-Dajabón, Anse-à-Pitres-Pedernales and Belladère-Comendador.

== Gallery ==
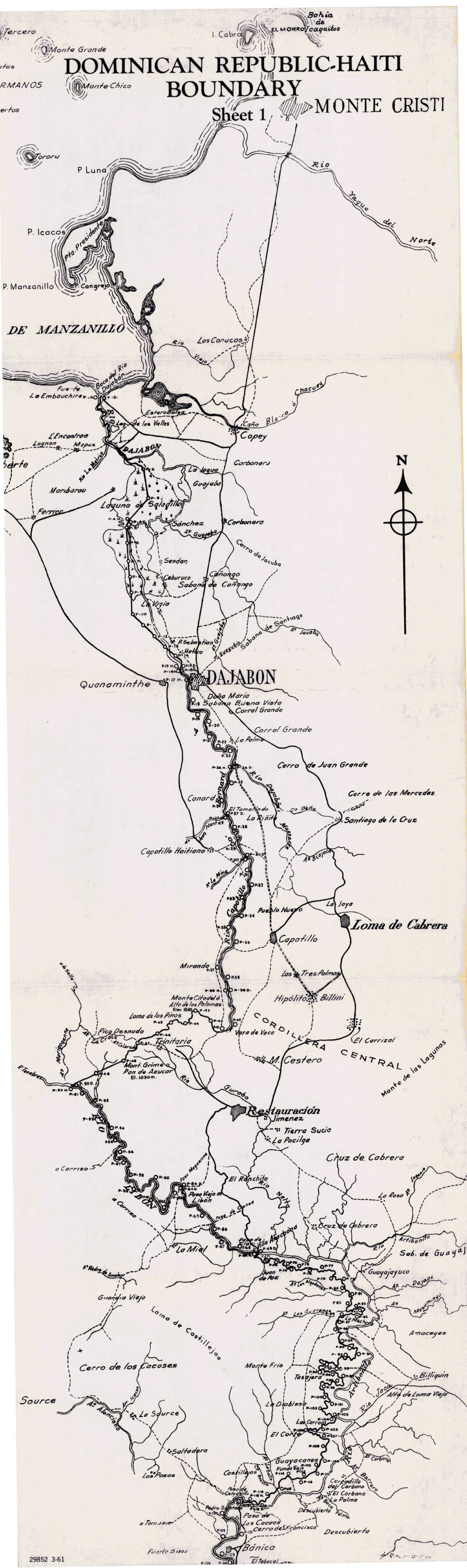
Map of the border - north

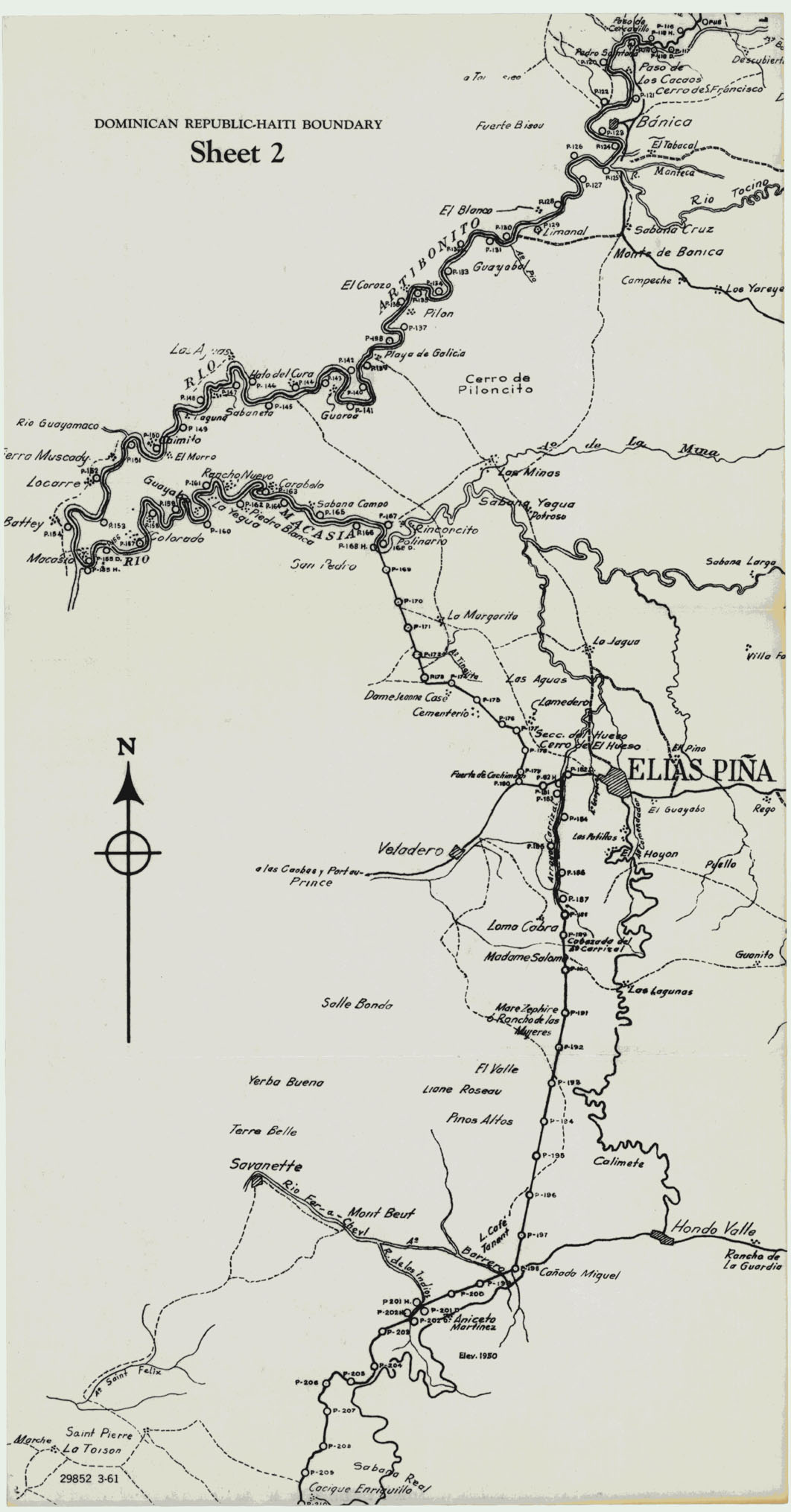
Map of the border - north central

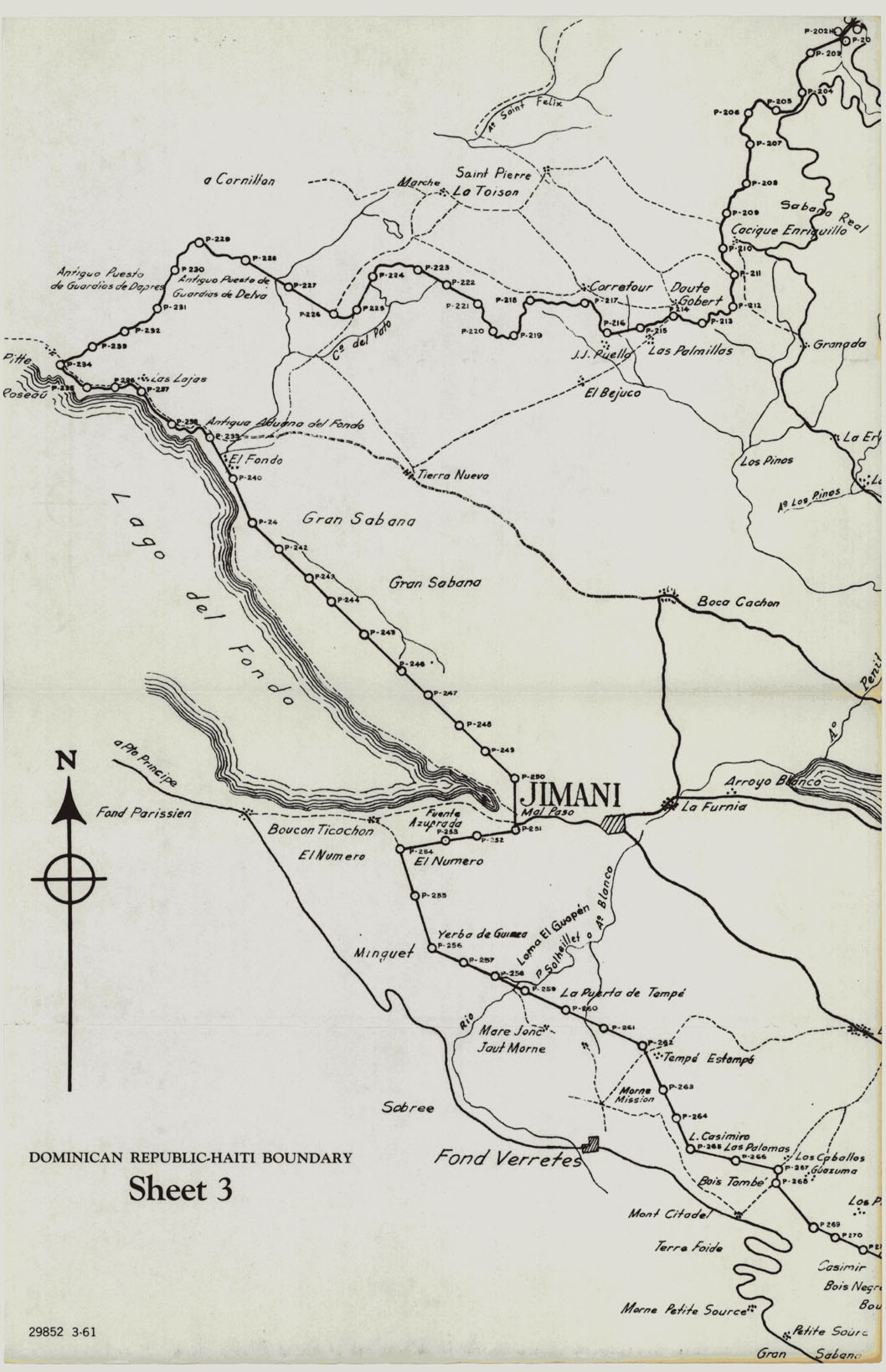
Map of the border - south central

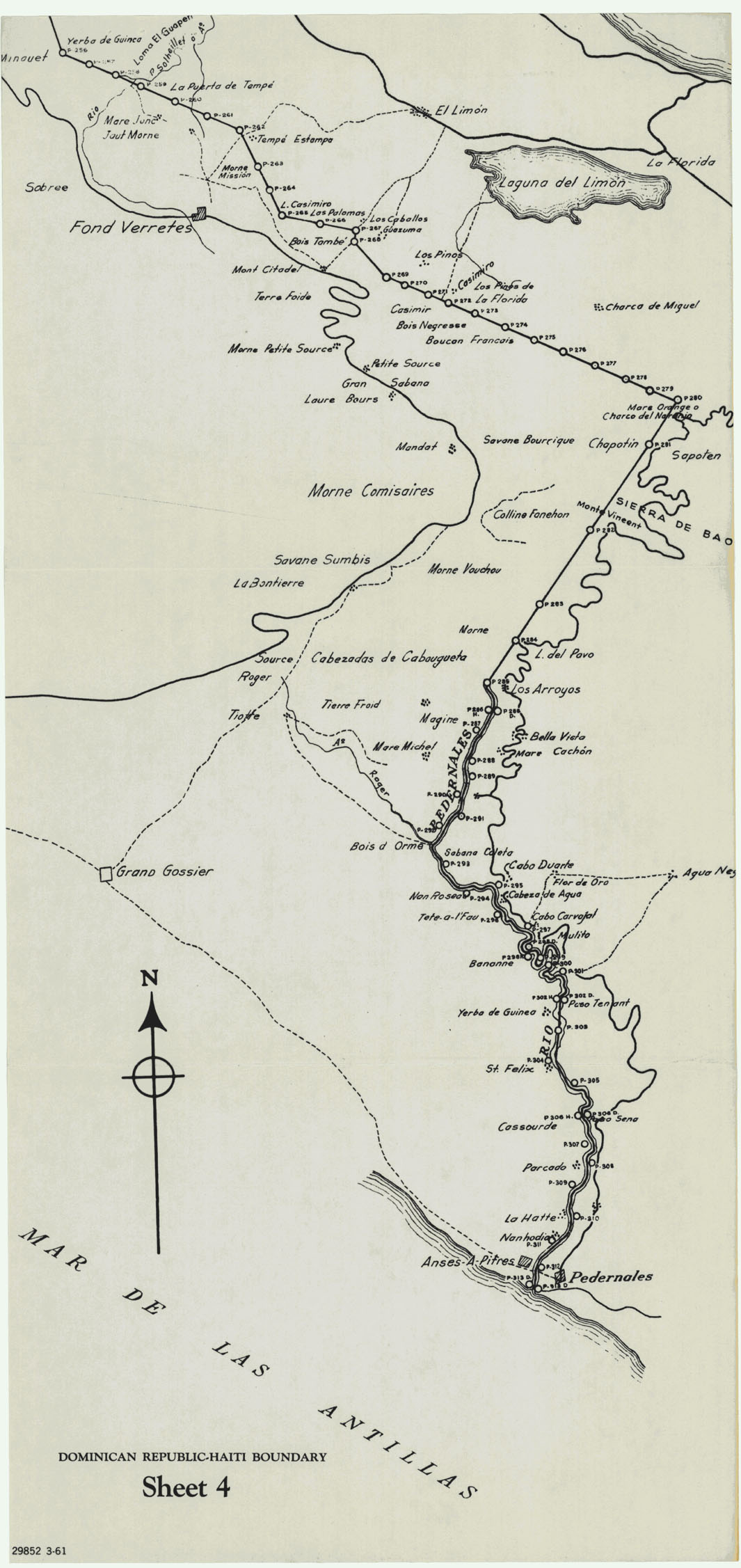
Map of the border - south

== See also ==
- Dominican Republic–Haiti relations
- Emperor Jacques I of Haiti
- Juan Pablo Duarte
