= Rivière de Fer à Cheval =

Coordinates: 18°50′N 72°06′W

Location
- Country: Haiti

The Rivière de Fer à Cheval (French pronunciation: [ʁivjɛʁ də fɛʁ a ʃəval]) is a river of Haiti. It is the primary tributary of the Artibonite River. This means that excess flow of water into the river can indirectly cause pressure on the Péligre Dam. This is notably the case in the aftermath of large-scale storms and hurricanes that hit Haiti.

== See also ==
- List of rivers of Haiti

== Additional sources ==
- GEOnet Names Server
