= Bánica =

- San Francisco de Bánica
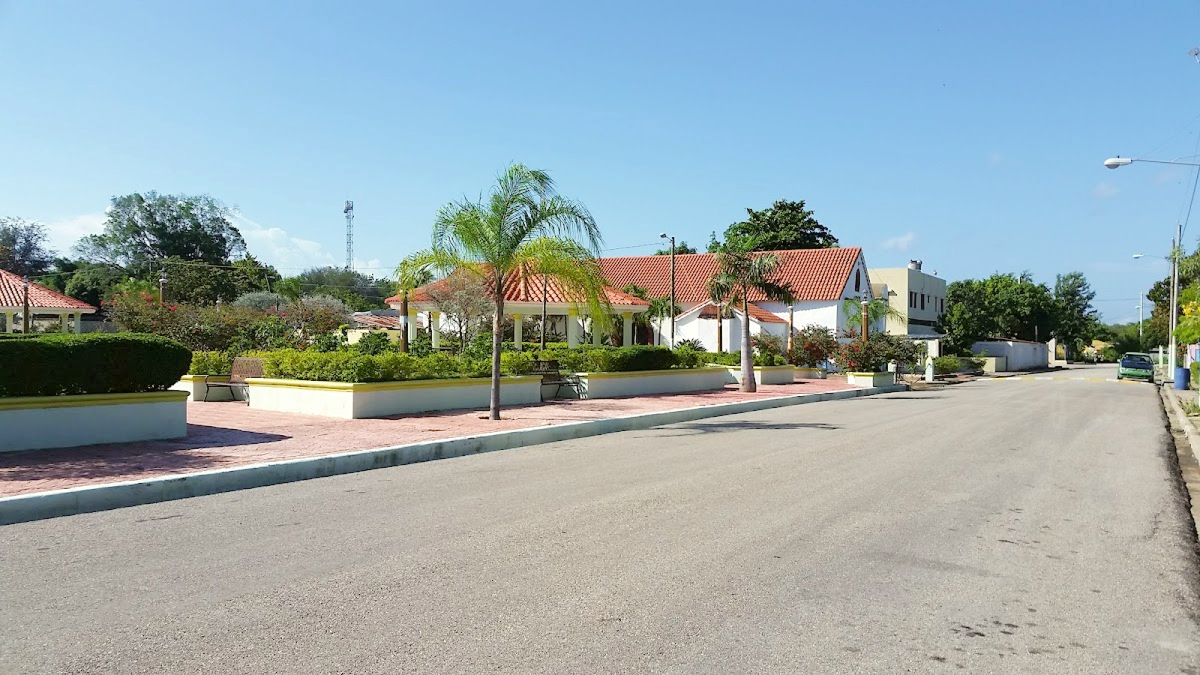
- Banica Dominican Republic street

- Location of Bánica in the Dominican Republic
- Coordinates: 19°05′N 71°41′W
- Country: Dominican Republic
- Province: Elías Piña
- Founded: 1504
- Municipality since: 1844

Area
  - Total: 265.98 km^{2} (102.70 sq mi)
- Elevation: 287 m (942 ft)

Population (2012)
  - Total: 7,856
  - Density: 29.54/km^{2} (76.50/sq mi)
  - Demonym: Baniquero(a)
- Distance to – Santo Domingo: 266 km
- Municipalities: 2

San Francisco de Bánica, or simply Bánica, is a town and municipality in the northwest region of Dominican Republic in the Elías Piña province. It is located on the border with Haiti near the Artibonite river. The name Bánica comes from the Taíno name of the region, Banique ("land of ebony").

== History ==
The town was founded in 1504 by Diego Velázquez, who later went to conquest the island of Cuba, on the left side of the River Artibonite. It was an important town in those years but later it lost its importance. In the 18th century, the Spanish government moved the city to its present place, away from the river, and brought families from the Canary Islands to live there.

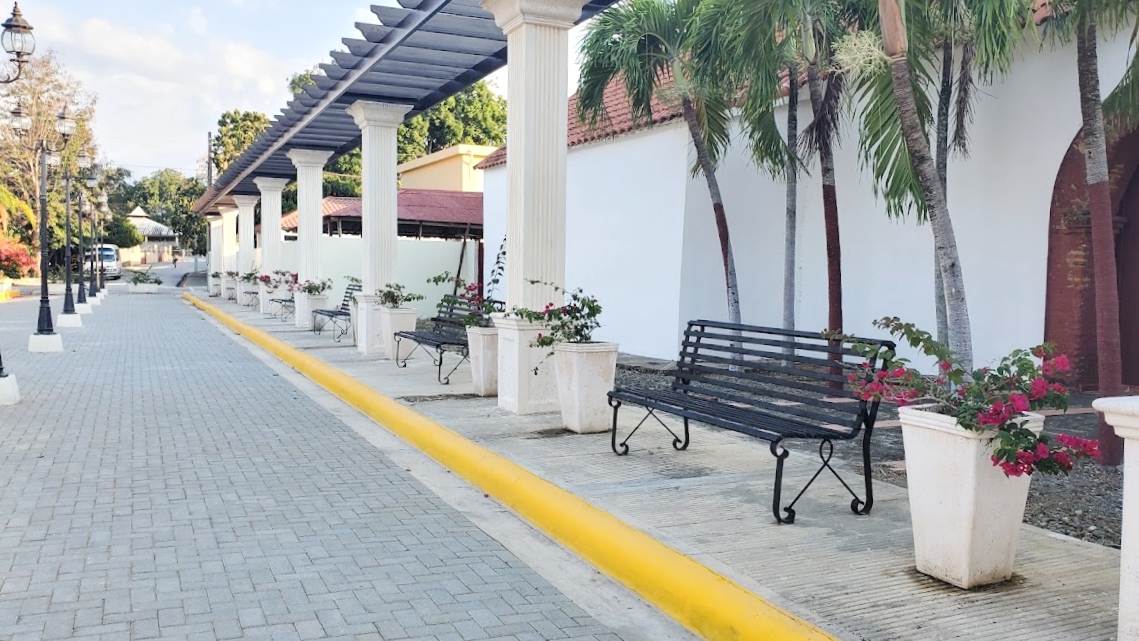
Banica, Dominican Republic Park area

During the slave revolts of the Haitian Revolution, many people left to other places in the island. When the Haitians occupied the eastern part of the island (the present Dominican Republic), they administered the town as part of the Department of Artibonite.

After the Independence in 1844, the town was elevated by the Dominican government to the category of municipality of the Azua province. But again the town was abandoned by its inhabitants. After the "Restoration War" (1863–1865), some families from other towns close to the Haitian border came to live in Bánica. Bánica was the first place where Dominican President Rafael Trujillo implemented his campaign against the Haitians, later known as the Parsley Massacre.

Bánica was made a municipality of the San Juan province in 1938 and then, in 1942, of the new province of Elías Piña.

== Economy ==
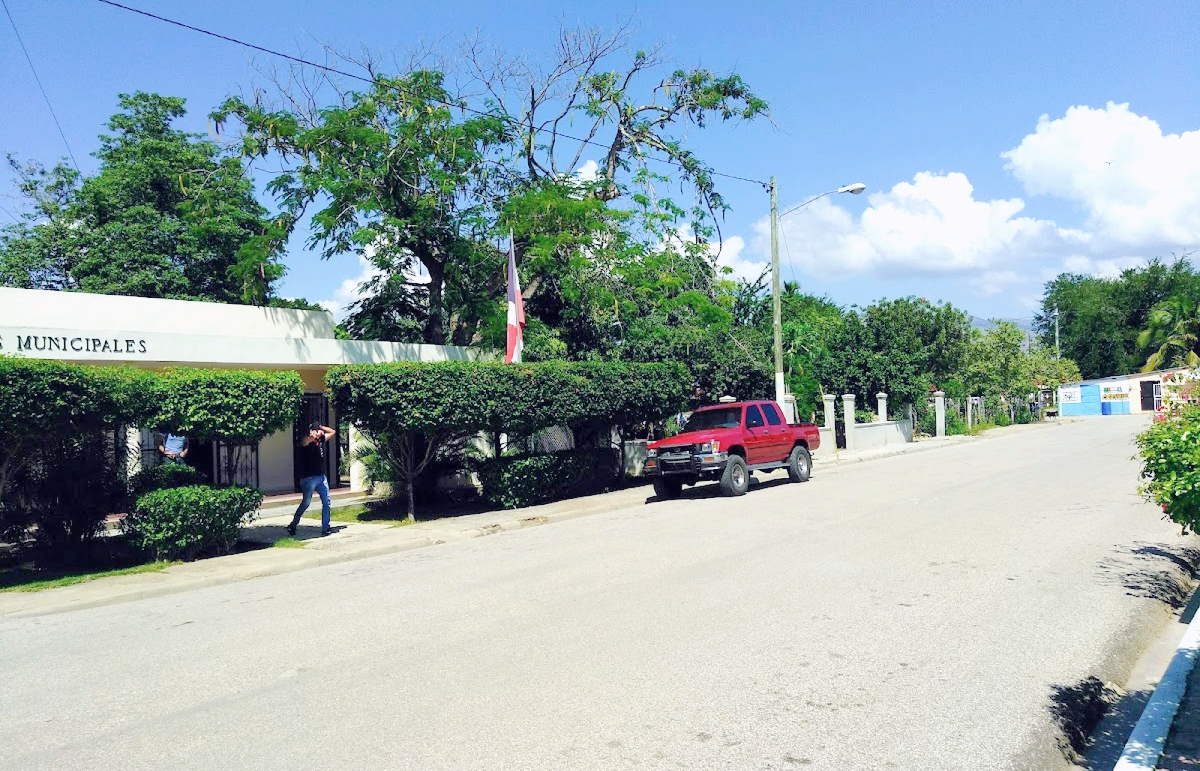
Road in border town of Banica, Dominican Republic

The main economic activity of the municipality is agriculture. Commerce with Haiti is also an important economic activity in the city. According to the last Population and Housing Census, the municipality has a total population of 7,272, of whom 3,802 were men and 3,470 women. The urban population of the municipality was only 20.05%.

== Places of interest ==
1. Iglesia de San Francisco de Asís (Saint Francis of Assisi Church). It is a very interesting colonial Catholic church. It is not known when it was built but in 1740 the Bishop Domingo Pantaleón Álvarez Abréu wrote that in Bánica "there is a new church".
2. Reloj de sol (Sundial). In one of his faces there is date, 1795, that could be the date when it was built. There were only two sundials in the old Spanish colony: one in Santo Domingo and another in Bánica.
3. Cerro de San Francisco (Saint Francis Hill). It is a rocky hill at 1.5 km from the city. Here there is a cave visited by many people to pray to Saint Francis; they get wet with water that falls from the top of the cave and they put limestone dust in their faces so when they get back to town they are identified by their white faces. The hill is protected by law because here there is the only wild population of Pereskia marcanoi, a cactus with leaves and beautiful small purple flowers; its common name is Rosa de Bánica ("Bánica Rose").
