= Macasía River =

Location
- Countries: Dominican Republic and Haiti

The Macasía River is a river of the Dominican Republic. A part of the river forms a small part of the international border between the Dominican Republic and Haiti.

== See also ==
- List of rivers of the Dominican Republic
