= Pepillo Salcedo, Dominican Republic =

Pepillo Salcedo
- Location within the Dominican Republic
- Coordinates: 19°42′0″N 71°45′0″W
- Country: Dominican Republic
- Province: Monte Cristi
- Municipality since: 1948

Area
  - Total: 149.32 km^{2} (57.65 sq mi)

Population (2012)
  - Total: 11,588
  - Density: 77.605/km^{2} (201.00/sq mi)
- Municipal Districts: 0

Pepillo Salcedo is a municipality in the Monte Cristi Province of the Dominican Republic, located next to the border with Haiti. Pepillo Salcedo is frequently named Manzanillo due to the Bahía De Manzanillo which is approximately 3 km from Coquito Beach. the city received its name from General José Antonio Salcedo who was a combatant in the Dominican War of Independence. General Salcedo was also an outstanding military leader in the Dominican Restoration War from 1863 to 1865. Pepillo Salcedo is a coastal town. It is built on the shores of the Bay of Manzanillo. In the westernmost part of the Dominican Northwest.

Its official name is Pepillo Salcedo, in accordance with Law 2089, of August 25, 1949, whose literature references the eponymous historical Dominican nationalist figure. This town is also popularly known by the names of Manzanillo and Puerto Libertador.

The Municipality of Pepillo Salcedo on the Dominican side and Meillac, on the Haitian side, are the starting points of the border of some four hundred kilometers that divides the two countries. The other end of the border line is at Pedernales and Anse-à-Pitre.

== Climate ==
Climate data for Pepillo Salcedo, Dominican Republic (1961–1990)
Month	Jan	Feb	Mar	Apr	May	Jun	Jul	Aug	Sep	Oct	Nov	Dec	Year
Record high °C (°F)	37.0 (98.6)	39.4 (102.9)	40.4 (104.7)	38.4 (101.1)	40.5 (104.9)	39.4 (102.9)	41.2 (106.2)	41.4 (106.5)	40.4 (104.7)	40.3 (104.5)	38.4 (101.1)	37.2 (99.0)	41.4 (106.5)
Mean daily maximum °C (°F)	29.4 (84.9)	29.7 (85.5)	30.6 (87.1)	31.0 (87.8)	31.7 (89.1)	33.0 (91.4)	34.1 (93.4)	34.1 (93.4)	33.2 (91.8)	32.2 (90.0)	30.8 (87.4)	29.4 (84.9)	31.6 (88.9)
Mean daily minimum °C (°F)	19.3 (66.7)	19.5 (67.1)	20.5 (68.9)	21.3 (70.3)	22.3 (72.1)	22.9 (73.2)	23.2 (73.8)	23.1 (73.6)	22.7 (72.9)	22.4 (72.3)	21.1 (70.0)	19.7 (67.5)	21.5 (70.7)
Record low °C (°F)	13.1 (55.6)	14.2 (57.6)	14.0 (57.2)	15.0 (59.0)	16.0 (60.8)	19.1 (66.4)	17.0 (62.6)	17.5 (63.5)	18.0 (64.4)	19.0 (66.2)	15.3 (59.5)	14.3 (57.7)	13.1 (55.6)
Average rainfall mm (inches)	42.7 (1.68)	36.6 (1.44)	38.8 (1.53)	53.3 (2.10)	90.7 (3.57)	90.9 (3.58)	59.6 (2.35)	60.0 (2.36)	81.6 (3.21)	92.2 (3.63)	76.3 (3.00)	55.2 (2.17)	777.9 (30.63)
Average rainy days (≥ 1.0 mm)	3.0	2.7	2.7	4.0	6.7	6.3	4.1	5.2	5.8	6.1	4.5	3.8	54.9
Source: NOAA

== Sources ==
- – World-Gazetteer.com

T. (2010, March). PEPILLO SALCEDO: PATRIOTA EXCEPCIONAL. Retrieved June 14, 2020, from https://diariodominicano.com/cultura/2018/03/17/262686/pepillo-salcedo-patriota-excepcional-
