= Juan G. Santiago =

American academic

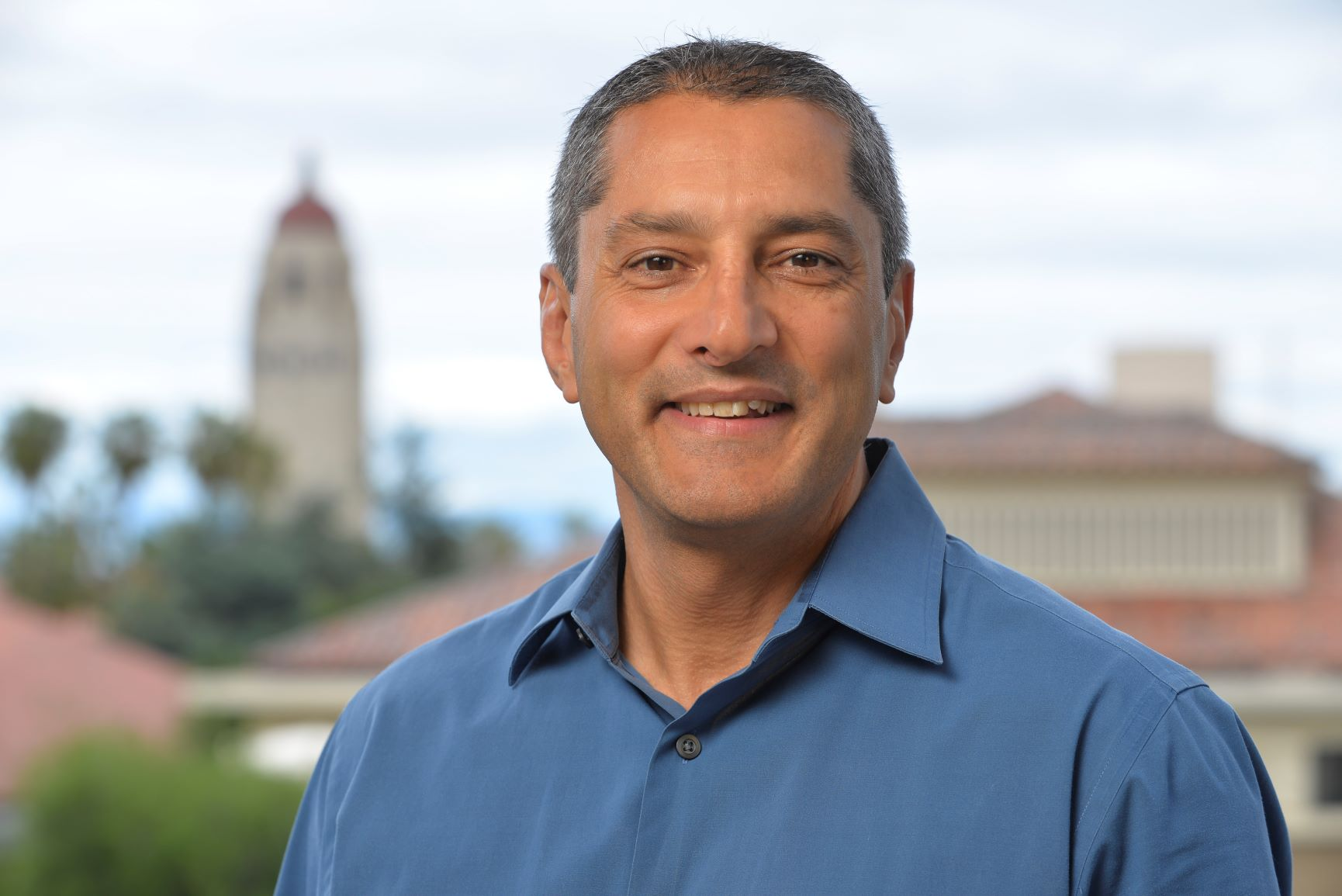
Juan G. Santiago, Stanford University

Juan G. Santiago an American academic. He is the Charles Lee Powell Foundation Professor of Mechanical Engineering at Stanford University and the director of the Stanford Microfluidics Laboratory. His research includes studies of microscale transport and fluid flow phenomena, electrokinetics phenomena, two-phase flow, and coupled flow and reaction processes. This research has applications to microfluidics systems for on-chip chemical and biochemical analysis, biophysics studies of DNA and CRISPR, two-phase flow devices, and capacitive deionization technologies. Applications of this work also include molecular diagnostics, DNA mapping and sequencing, electronics cooling, and the production of drinking water. He serves as the Founding Editor-in-Chief of the Cambridge University Press journal Flow. His work is cited more than 1600 times per year and has an h index of 97. He has authored and co-authored over 240 journal papers and 250 conference papers, and he is an inventor in 68 issued patents. He has played a significant role in co-founding several companies specializing in the field of microfluidics.

== Early life ==
Santiago was born in San Juan, Puerto Rico, the son of Cuban Refugees. His parents worked hard to provide for their family. Santiago started working various part-time jobs from age 13 in order to contribute to the family. In high school, he worked cutting grass, delivering newspapers, delivering phone books, and bagging groceries. In college, he worked as a movie theater attendant and cleaner, a worker at an airplane parts warehouse, delivering Dominos Pizza, as a clerk at KB Toys, a stagehand for a Spanish-channel TV show named Sábado Gigante, a box-car loader for UPS, and a liquor store clerk in Little Havana. He practiced various forms of martial arts and served as captain of his high-school wrestling team. Santiago also held a paying job as a martial arts instructor.

== Education ==
Santiago started his undergraduate career at Florida International University (FIU), and later transferred to the University of Florida. He earned his Bachelor of Science in Mechanical Engineering in 1990, graduating first in his class. He then attended the University of Illinois at Urbana-Champaign, Mechanical Engineering, where in 1992 he earned his Master of Science. Santiago earned his PhD at the University of Illinois at Urbana-Champaign, Mechanical Engineering in 1995.

== Career ==
Santiago joined Stanford University as a faculty member in Mechanical Engineering in 1998. His research involves the study of micron-scale transport phenomena, electrokinetics, two-phase flow, and the design of microfluidic devices. His research has applications to on-chip biological assays to detect and identify DNA, on-chip chemical reactions, electronics cooling, and the desalination of water to create drinking water. Along with Professor Carl Meinhart of UCSB, Santiago co-invented a technique to quantify fluid velocities at small scales called micro-PIV. An example contribution from his lab is a microfluidic device capable of detecting the RNA of the COVID-19 virus within just 30 minutes starting from a nasal swab. Santiago would later join Ashwan Ramachandran to improve the COVID-19 detection. His team also develops systems designed to purify brackish water by removing salt and other contaminants, in order to make it safe for drinking.

In 2022, Santiago was elected as the Charles Lee Powell Foundation Professor of Mechanical Engineering at Stanford University. He serves as the Vice Chair for the Mechanical Engineering Department. His current research is focused on various areas, including the creation of microfluidic systems for DNA mapping, identification of cancer markers, and the development of flow electrode systems for desalination and harvesting of lithium.

Santiago is a member of multiple American engineering organizations including the American Institute for Medical and Biological Engineering, American Physical Society, and the American Society of Mechanical Engineering.

Over 30 of Santiago's former PhD students and postdocs have stayed active in microfluidics research. Among them, more than 20 have gone on to become professors at top universities, while others have taken roles in industry labs or launched startups in the field.

== Awards ==
Santiago has been recognized with many academic and research awards over the years. He was awarded the Presidential Early Career Award for Scientists and Engineers in 2004. He was awarded the AES Electrophoresis Society Lifetime Achievement Award. He was given the Outstanding Alumnus Award from the Mechanical Engineering Department of the University of Florida in 2008. He was elected Fellow of the American Physical Society (2010), Fellow of the American Society of Mechanical Engineering (2012), and Fellow of the American Institute for Medical and Biological Engineering (2016). He was awarded the Cozzarelli Prize for work on cell analysis by the National Academy of Sciences in 2017. In 2022, he was elected to the American Academy of Arts and Sciences. In 2022, he was also elected to National Academy of Inventors. Member of the National Academy of Engineering (NAE).
