= Partido, Dominican Republic =

Coordinates: 19°28′48″N 71°33′00″W

Partido
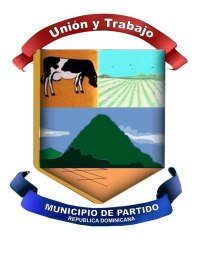
- Coat of arms
- Interactive map of Partido
- Country: Dominican Republic
- Province: Dajabón

Area
  - Total: 157.29 km^{2} (60.73 sq mi)

Population (2012)
  - Total: 7,593
  - Density: 48.27/km^{2} (125.0/sq mi)
- Climate: Am

Partido is a town in the Dajabón province of the Dominican Republic.

== Sources ==
- – World-Gazetteer.com
