= Río Limpio =

- Location within the Dominican Republic
- Coordinates: 19°15′00″N 71°31′48″W
- Country: Dominican Republic
- Province: Elías Piña

Population (2008)
  - Total: 1,394

Río Limpio is a town in the Elías Piña province of the Dominican Republic.

== Sources ==
- – World-Gazetteer.com
