= Comendador, Dominican Republic =

Comendador
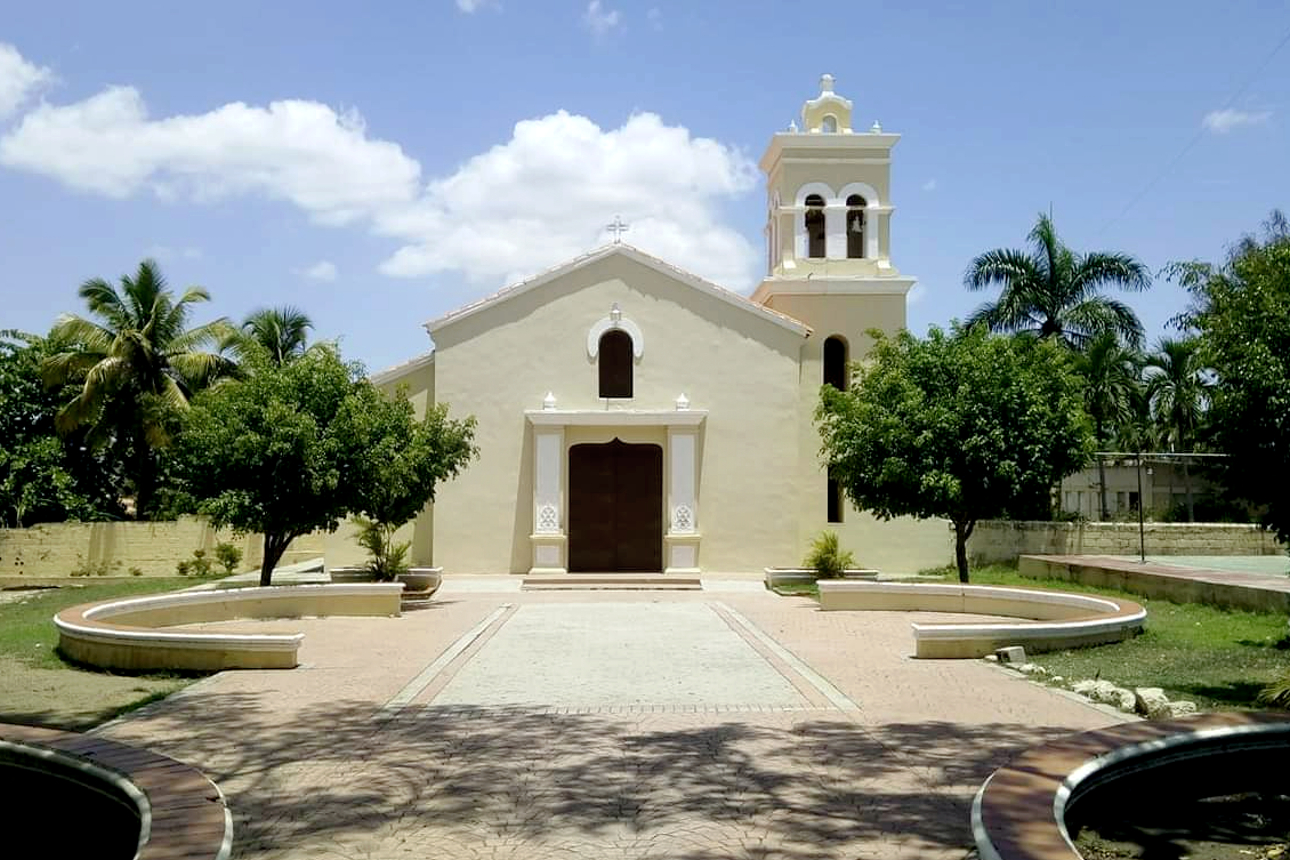
- Church in Comendador

- Location within the Dominican Republic
- Coordinates: 18°52′39″N 71°42′10″W
- Country: Dominican Republic
- Province: Elías Piña
- Founded: 1868

Area
  - Total: 252.93 km^{2} (97.66 sq mi)
- Elevation: 395 m (1,296 ft)

Population (2012)
  - Total: 43,894
  - Density: 173.54/km^{2} (449.47/sq mi)
  - Urban: 27,908
- Distance to – Santo Domingo: 255 km
- Municipal Districts: 2
- Climate: Aw

Comendador is the capital of the Elías Piña province of the Dominican Republic. It has a border crossing to the Haitian town Belladère.

== Population ==
The municipality had, in 2012, a total population of 43,894. In this numbers are included the population of the municipal district Sabana Larga.

== History ==
The city was named after its founder, the "Comendador of Lares" (Comendador was the chief of a military or religious order) but on 29 November 1930 it was changed to Elías Piña. By the Law 342 of 29 May 1972 the city was named again Comendador.

== Economy ==
The main economic activity of the municipality is agriculture.
