= List of Dominican Republic Provinces by etymology =

This article provides a collection of the etymologies of the names of the provinces of the Dominican Republic.

Province Name	Language of origin	Source word	Meaning and notes
Azua	Taíno		Taíno name which can mean either mountainous or hard to tame
Baoruco	Taíno		The name for the Yaque del Sur River
Barahona	Spanish	Bara Hona	The theory affirms that the name comes him for that of current, Bahía Honda now called Bahía de Neiba.
Dajabón	French, Taíno		One of them attributes it to a fish that existed in the river Massacre, called Dajao, which meant river in local Taíno, which, united to the French word "bonne" that signifies good, would have produced the name.
Distrito Nacional	Spanish		literally means National District. This district is where the capital is located.
Duarte	Spanish		named for Juan Pablo Duarte, 19th-century revolutionary and one of the country's founding fathers.
Elías Piña	Spanish		hero of the wars of independence
El Seibo	Spanish, Taíno		The name of Seibo, itself due to a tribal leader of race Taíno, that was called Seebo. This Seebo was a species of Sub-Cacique, subject to the dispositions of the Overlord of Higuey: Cayacocha.
Espaillat	French		named for Ulises Francisco Espaillat (1823–1878), 19th-century author and president
Hato Mayor	Spanish		means greater cattle-raising district
Hermanas Mirabal	Spanish		named for the Mirabal Sisters (Patria, Minerva, and María Teresa), martyred for their opposition to Rafael Trujillo.
Independencia	Spanish		Literally means Independence, named after multiple wars for independence from Haiti in 1844.
La Altagracia	Spanish	Alta Gracia	the brothers Alonso and Antonio de Trejo arrived from Spain in the early 16th century with a painting of Our Lady of La Altagracia. Miracles are attributed to it. Means upper grace
La Romana	Spanish		the name came after a steelyard balance, used in the sugarcane industry.
La Vega	Spanish		named after the star of Vega which was seen in the founding night of the location.
María Trinidad Sánchez	Spanish		named after Francisco del Rosario Sánchez’s aunt and a female soldier in the wars of independence
Monseñor Nouel	French, Spanish		named for a president of the republic, Monsignor Dr. Adolfo Alejandro Nouel y Bobadilla
Monte Cristi	Latin	Monte Christi	The name of Monte Cristi associates to the days in which Christopher Columbus explored those lands. Friday, 4 January 1493 when the discoverer sailed next to the coasts, I remain deeply touched with the visual impression that abandonment in him the slender colony of Nose. He seemed so much to Golgotha where he died crucified the divine one Galilee that exclaimed ¡Mount of Christ!
Monte Plata	Spanish		Named after the people who migrated to the location that came from Monte Cristi and Puerto Plata. Literally means silver mountain.
Pedernales	Spanish		Literally means in Spanish "flints", which is located in the Pedernales River.
Peravia	Spanish		Name derives from a corruption of the Spanish surname Pravia, who carried the lady Ana de Pravia, daughter of Francisco Ruiz de Pravia and Beatriz de la Rocha, who lived on a ranch that existed at the beginning of colonial period in the location.
Puerto Plata	Spanish	Puerto Plata	Literally means silver port. Named after all the silver that was found in the location by the settlers.
Samaná	Taíno		Named after what the Taíno tribe called the location, Xamaná.
Sánchez Ramírez	Spanish		named for Brigadier Juan Sánchez Ramírez, hero of the battle of Palo Incado (1808).
San Cristóbal	Spanish		named after Christopher Columbus. Immortalized as saint in the region in the colonial period. Literally Saint Christopher.
San José de Ocoa	Spanish, Taíno		This province takes its name of the Ocoa River that crosses the province of north to south, passing for the capital city.
San Juan	Spanish, Taíno		named after San Juan Bautista. It is the first San Juan of the Americas. Nicolas de Ovando named it San Juan de la Maguana. Maguana after the caciquedom wherein the province is located.
San Pedro de Macorís	Taíno		Macorís is a native word in the colonial period for "speaker of a foreign language". The land reminded Christopher Columbus of San Pedro de Alcántara.
Santiago	Spanish		Its name comes from the name of the city that has always been its capital: Santiago de los Caballeros. Besides, is the first one Santiago of America, that is to say, first city with that name. Named after the same geographic of Santiago de Compostela.
Santiago Rodríguez	Spanish		named for one of the founders of the city (founded in 1844)
Santo Domingo	Spanish	Santo Domingo	named after the national capital which the province separated from. Literally means Holy Sunday.
Valverde	Spanish		named for General José Desiderio Valverde, 19th-century president
