= Ocoa River =

Ocoa

Location
- Country: Dominican Republic
- Provinces: San José de Ocoa, Peravia, Azua
- District: San José de Ocoa, Baní, Las Charcas
- Cities: San José de Ocoa, Sabana Buey, Villa Fundación

Physical characteristics
- Source
  - location: La Chorreosa, Valle Nuevo, Dominican Republic
  - elevation: 2,270 m (7,450 ft)
- Mouth: Ocoa Bay
  - coordinates: 18°16′51″N 70°35′30″W
  - elevation: 0 m (0 ft)
- Length: 68 km (42 mi)
- Basin size: 745 km^{2} (288 sq mi)
- Discharge
  - average: 4.25 m^{3}/s (150 cu ft/s)

Basin features
- Tributaries
  - left: El Canal, Arroyo Parra
  - right: Banilejo

The Ocoa River is a river of the Dominican Republic.

== See also ==
- List of rivers of the Dominican Republic
