= List of regions of the Dominican Republic by Human Development Index =

This is a list of regions of the Dominican Republic by Human Development Index as of 2024.

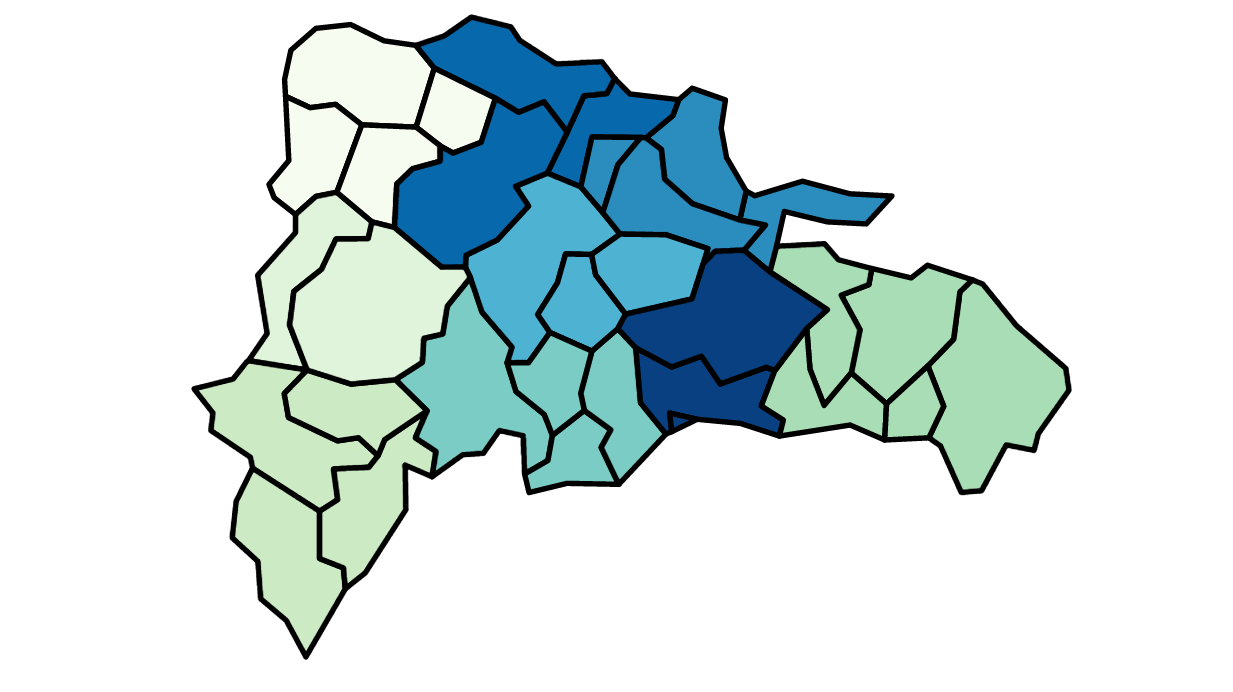
Regions of the Dominican Republic by HDI in 2018.764.755.745.737.733.728.706.697.694

Rank	Region	HDI (2023)
High human development
1	Region 0 (Distrito Nacional, Santo Domingo, Monte Plata)	0.793
-	Dominican Republic (average)	0.776
2	Region VIII (La Vega, Monsenor Nouel, Sanchez Ramirez)	0.774
3	Region I (Peravia, San Cristobal, San José de Ocoa, Azua)	0.771
3	Region III (Duarte, Maria Trinidad Sanchez, Hermanas Mirabal, Samana)	0.771
5	Region II (Espaillat, Puerto Plata, Santiago)	0.769
6	Region IV (Independencia, Bahoruco, Barahona, Pedernales Province)	0.763
7	Region V (El Seibo, La Altagracia, La Romana, San Pedro de Macoris, Hato Mayor)	0.760
8	Region VII (Dajabon, Monte Cristi, Santiago Rodriguez, Valverde)	0.750
9	Region VI (San Juan, Elias Pina)	0.743
