= List of Dominican Republic Provinces mottos =

This article provides a collection of the mottos of the provinces of the Dominican Republic.

Province	Motto	Translated
Azua	"La Atenas del Sur"	"The Athens of the South"
Bahoruco	"Tierra del Lago Enriquillo"	"Land of the Lake Enriquillo"
Barahona	"La Perla del Sur"	"The Pearl of the South"
Dajabón	"Puerta de la Española"	"Gate of the Hispaniola"
Distrito Nacional	"la Ciudad Primada de las Américas"	"the First City of the Americas"
Duarte	"Capital Mundial del Cacao Orgánico"	"Organic Cocoa Capital of the World"
Elías Piña	"Tierra de los Restauradores"	"Land of the Restaurateurs"
El Seibo	"Tierra de Historia y Cultura"	"Land of History and Culture"
Espaillat	"Tierra de frescas brisas y exuberante vegetación"	"Land of cool breezes and lush greenery"
Hato Mayor	"Ganado del Este y Capital del Cítrico"	"Livestock of the East and the Citric Capital"
Hermanas Mirabal	"Tierra de las Mariposas"	"Land of the Butterflies"
Independencia	"Tierra de Diversidad Biológica de la República Dominicana"	"Biodiversity Land of the Dominican Republic"
La Altagracia	"Tierra del Sol"	"Land of the Sun"
La Romana	"La Flor del Este"	"The Flower of the East"
La Vega	"Provincia Culta, Olímpica y Carnavalesca"	"Cultured, Carnival and Olympic Province"
María Trinidad Sánchez	"Tierra de Mariscos, Merengue y Folclore Dominicano"	"Land of Seafood, Merengue típico and Dominican Folklore"
Monseñor Nouel	"Tierra de las Hortensias"	"Land of Hydrangeas"
Monte Cristi	"Tierra de los Moros"	"Land of the Moors"
Monte Plata	"Tierra Esmeralda"	"Emerald Land"
Pedernales	"Tierra del Paraíso y Bahías Fluorescentes"	"Land of Paradise and Fluorescent Bays"
Peravia	"Tierra de los Mangos y Paisajes Salinos"	"Land of Mangoes and Saline Landscapes"
Puerto Plata	"La Novia del Atlantico y la Tacita de Plata"	"The Bride of the Atlantic and the Silver Cup"
Samaná	"Tierras Taína de Bahias, Paisajes y Cultura"	"Taino Land of Bays, Landscape and Culture"
San Cristóbal	"Provincia de la Primera Constitución"	"Province of the First Constitution"
San José de Ocoa	"La Provincia entre montañas, y Capital del Ecoturismo"	"The Province between mountains, and Capital of Ecotourism"
San Juan	"El granero del sur"	"The Southern Barn"
San Pedro de Macorís	"Tierra de Peloteros y Escritores"	"Land of Baseball Players and Writers"
Sánchez Ramírez	"Tierra del Oro"	"Land of Gold"
Santiago	"Ciudad corazón"	"Heart City (City of Love) "
Santiago Rodríguez	"La Cuna de la Restauración"	"The Cradle of the Restoration"
Santo Domingo	"Tierra Primada de las Américas"	"Primatial Land of the Americas"
Valverde	"Tierra de los Bellos Atardeceres"	"Land of Beautiful Sunsets"
