= Pizarrete =

- Location within the Dominican Republic
- Coordinates: 18°18′0″N 70°13′12″W
- Country: Dominican Republic
- Province: Peravia

Population (2008)
  - Total: 2,920

Pizarrete is a town in the Peravia province of the Dominican Republic.

== Sources ==
- – World-Gazetteer.com
