= Sabana Larga =

Coordinates: 18.58500°N 70.49820°W

- Interactive map of Sabana Larga
- Country: Dominican Republic
- Province: San José de Ocoa

Area
  - Total: 167.00 km^{2} (64.48 sq mi)

Population (2012)
  - Total: 12,698
  - Density: 76.036/km^{2} (196.93/sq mi)

Sabana Larga is a town in the San José de Ocoa province of the Dominican Republic.

== Sources ==
- – World-Gazetteer.com
