= Matanzas, Dominican Republic =

Matanzas
- Coordinates: 18°14′34.2″N 70°25′09.2″W
- Country: Dominican Republic
- Province: Peravia
- Established as a Municipality: June 1, 2014

Area
  - Total: 101.04 km^{2} (39.01 sq mi)

Population (2014)
  - Total: 35,414
  - Density: 350.49/km^{2} (907.78/sq mi)

Matanzas is a municipality in the Peravia province of the Dominican Republic. It was recently created as a municipality on June 1, 2014.
