= La Ciénaga, San José de Ocoa =

Coordinates: 18.57836°N 70.45191°W

La Ciénaga
- Interactive map of La Ciénaga
- Country: Dominican Republic
- Province: San José de Ocoa

Population (2008)
  - Total: 1 468

La Ciénaga is a town in the San José de Ocoa province of the Dominican Republic.

== Sources ==
- – World-Gazetteer.com
