= San José de Ocoa =

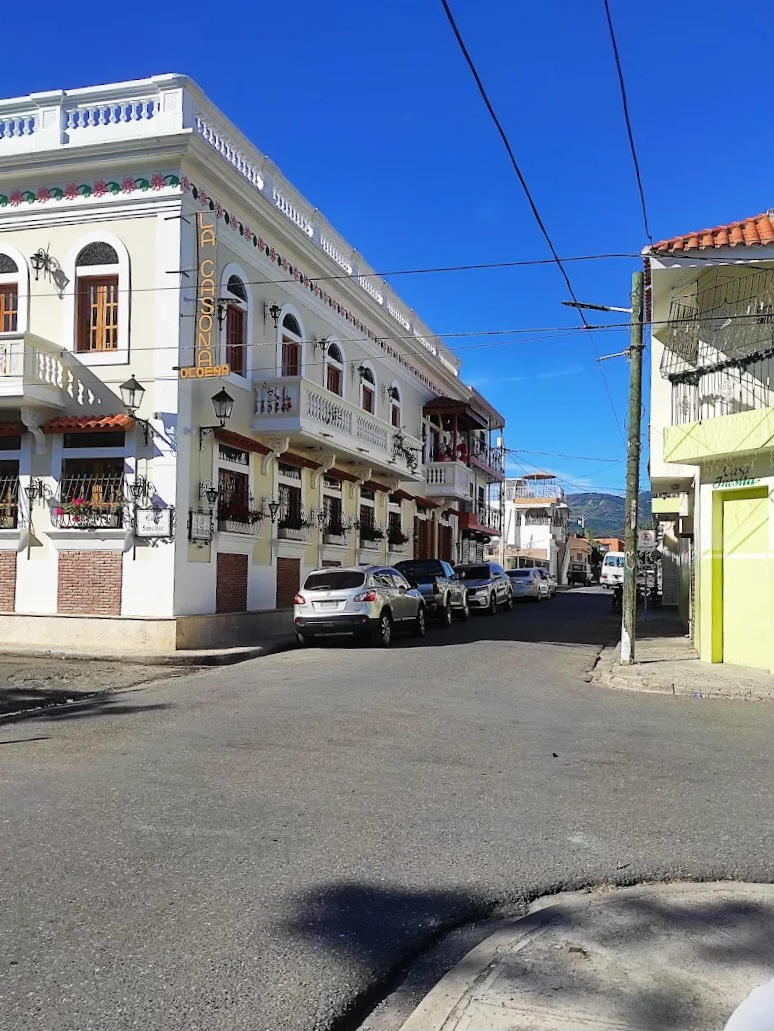
- Street view of San José de Ocoa, Dominican Republic.

- Coat of arms

- San José de Ocoa in the Dominican Republic
- Coordinates: 18°33′00″N 70°30′00″W
- Country: Dominican Republic
- Province: San José de Ocoa
- Founded: 1805
- Municipality since: 1858

Area
  - Total: 484.87 km^{2} (187.21 sq mi)
- Elevation: 475 m (1,558 ft)

Population (2012)
  - Total: 21,148
  - Density: 43.616/km^{2} (112.96/sq mi)
  - Demonym: Ocoeño(a)
- Distance to – Santo Domingo: 112 km
- Municipal Districts: 3

San José de Ocoa, or simply Ocoa, is the capital of San José de Ocoa province in the Dominican Republic. It is located in a valley in the southern region of the Central Cordillera mountain range.

== History ==
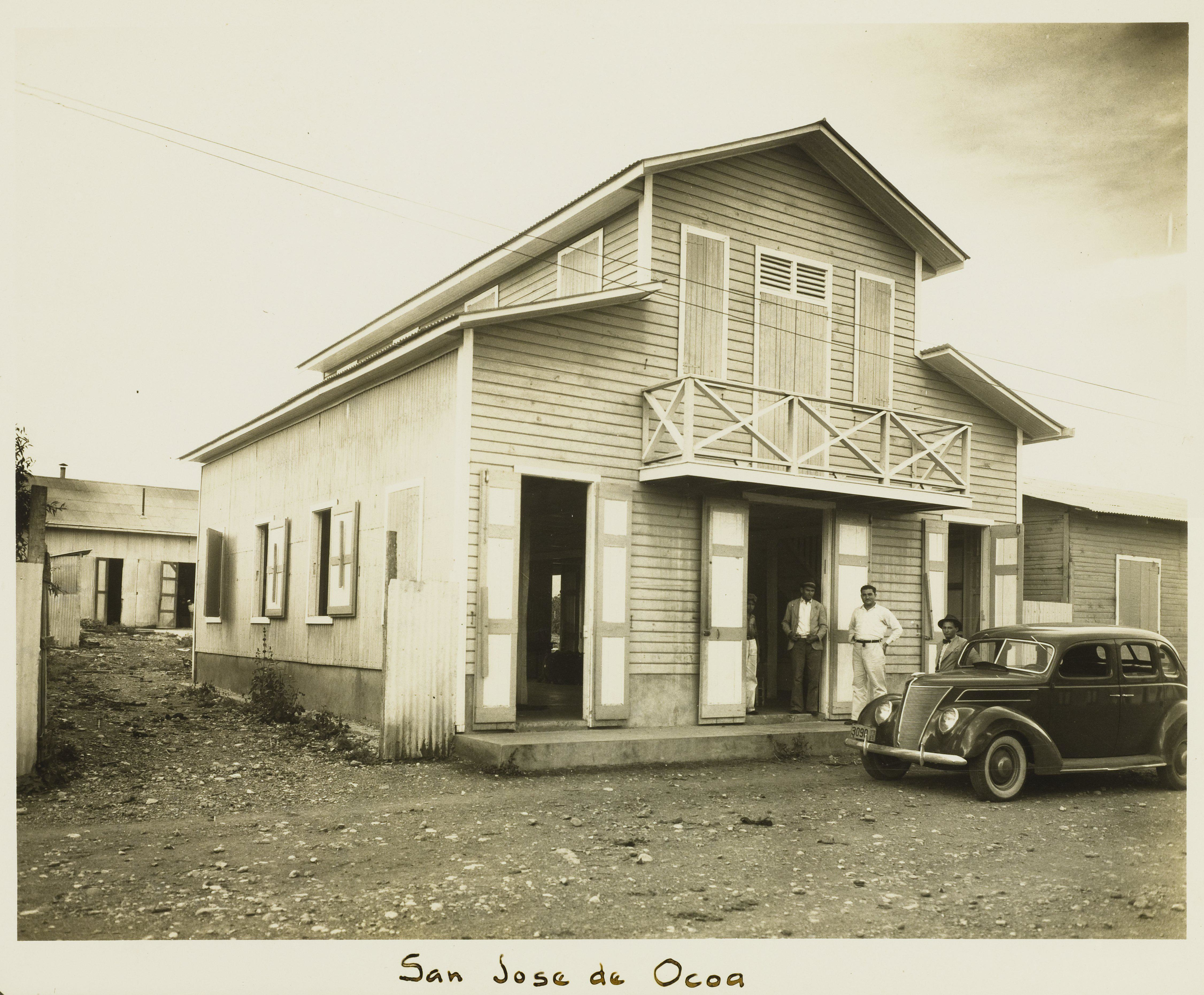
Photograph of San José de Ocoa in the 1930s.

The town was founded in 1805 by people from the southern town of Baní. The Spanish Canarian descendants were the first ethnic group to settle in San José de Ocoa, remaining a significant group in the town today. Other families from peninsular Spain, Italy and France would soon follow. Blacks (to a lesser extent) would also would later settle in San José de Ocoa, most of them being Afro-Caribbean Cocolo descendants arriving from San Pedro de Macoris.

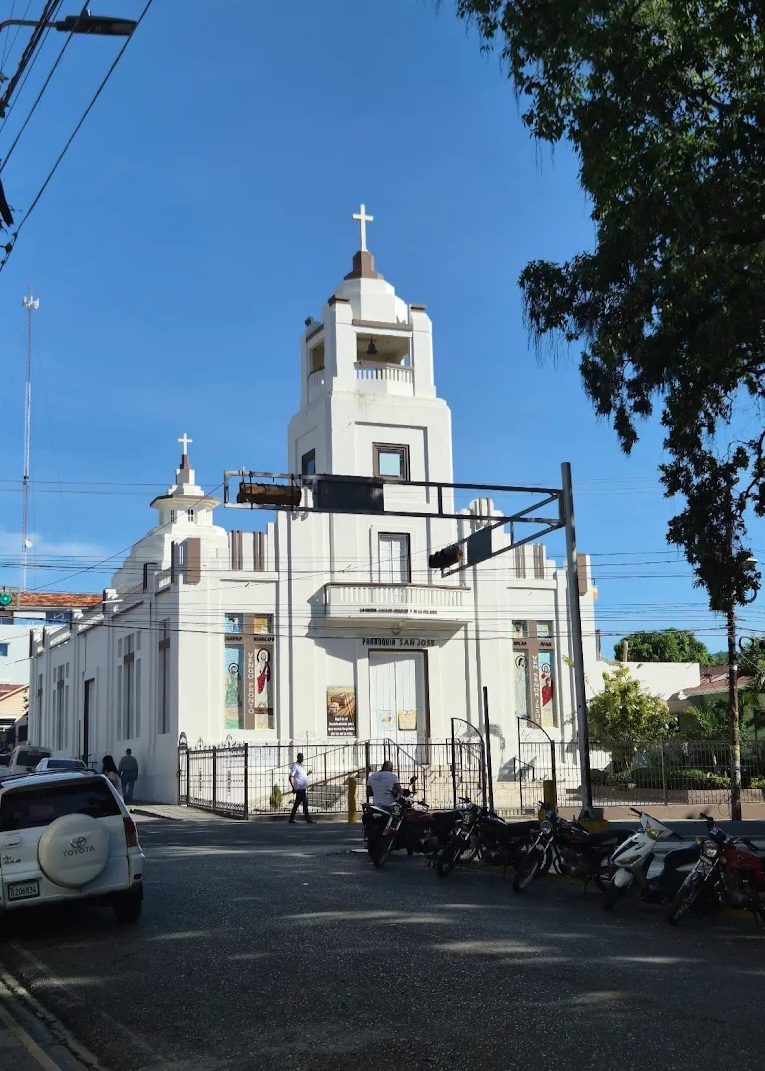
Church of San Jose de Ocoa.

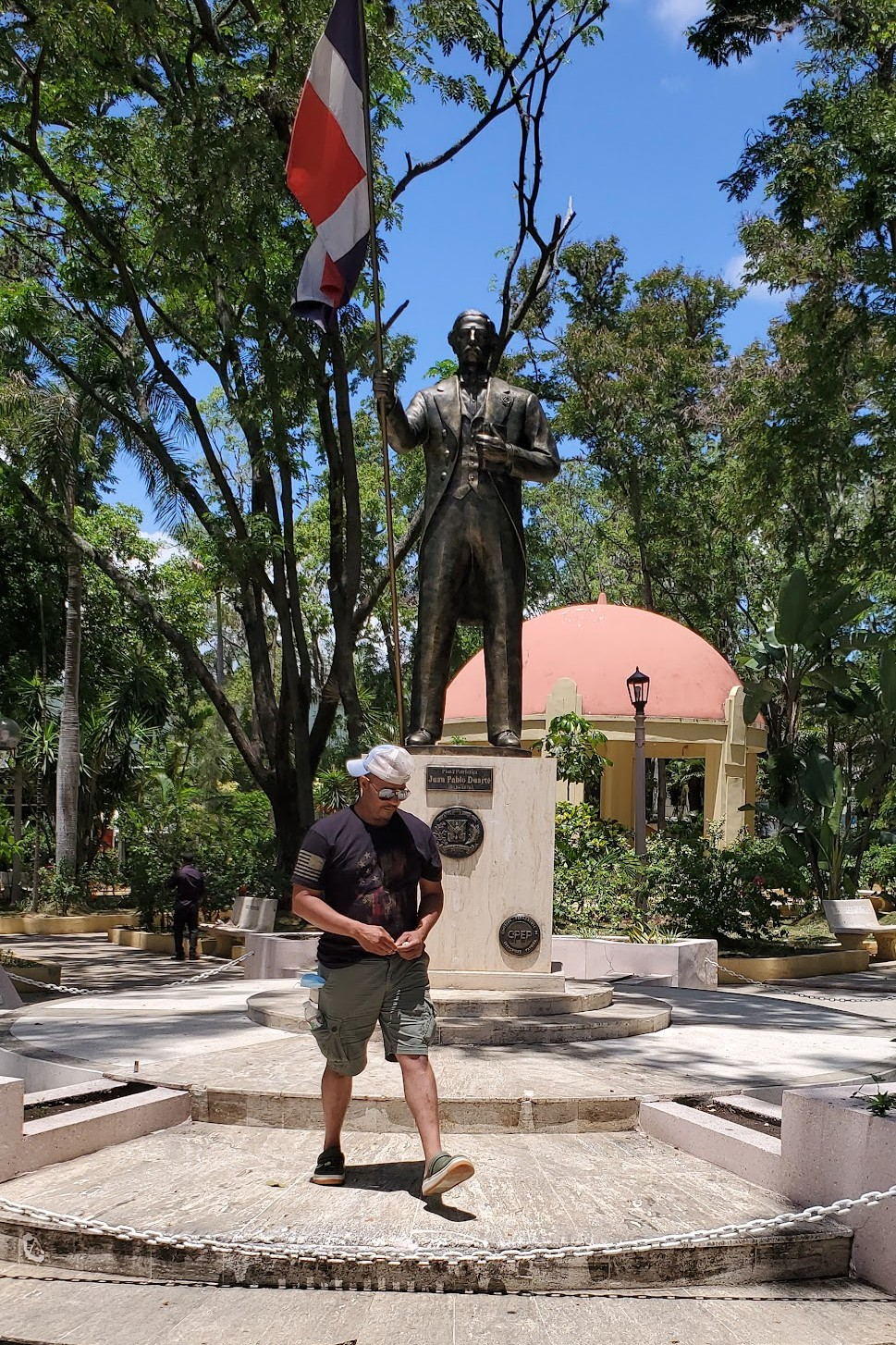
San José de Ocoa park.

In December 1858, San José de Ocoa was elevated to the category of municipality in the former province of Santo Domingo; in 1895, it was transferred to the province of Azua. In 1944 when the province of Peravia was created, San José de Ocoa became a municipality of this province. Finally, the town became the capital municipality of the new province of San José de Ocoa on 6 September 2000.

== Geography ==
San José de Ocoa is located at an altitude of 475 metres or 1,558 feet. The municipality covers an area of 484.87 square kilometres or 187.21 square miles. It lies on the banks of the Ocoa River in the sub-region of Valdesia.

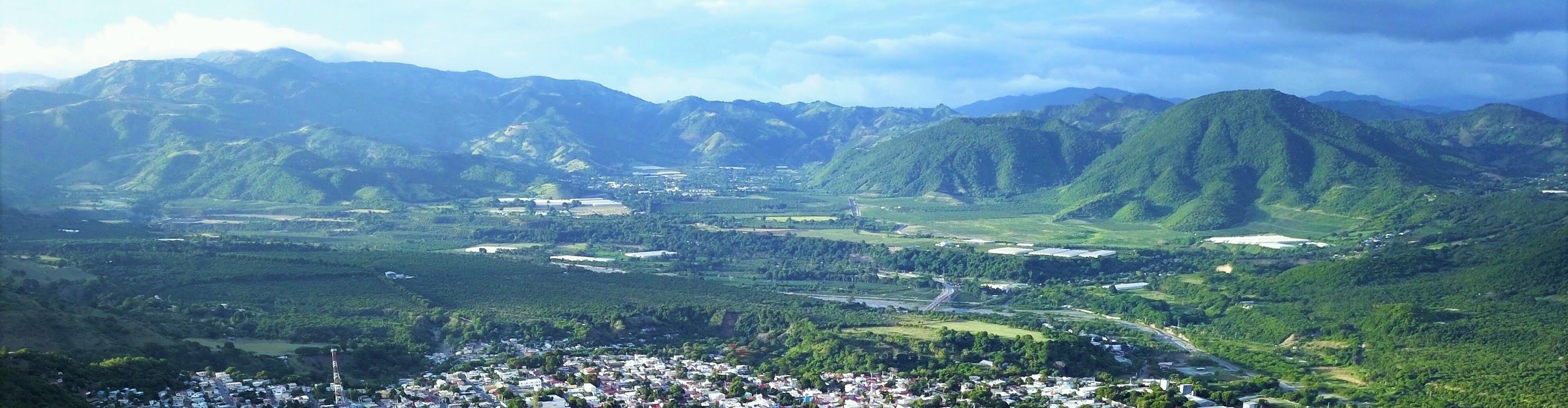
San José de Ocoa, Dominican Republic mountain view.

== Climate ==
Climate data for San José de Ocoa (1961-1990)
Month	Jan	Feb	Mar	Apr	May	Jun	Jul	Aug	Sep	Oct	Nov	Dec	Year
Record high °C (°F)	35.8 (96.4)	34.5 (94.1)	35.6 (96.1)	34.7 (94.5)	35.5 (95.9)	37.6 (99.7)	36.7 (98.1)	37.6 (99.7)	37.6 (99.7)	35.7 (96.3)	35.6 (96.1)	36.4 (97.5)	37.6 (99.7)
Mean daily maximum °C (°F)	28.8 (83.8)	29.3 (84.7)	29.7 (85.5)	30.1 (86.2)	30.4 (86.7)	31.1 (88.0)	31.8 (89.2)	32.0 (89.6)	31.8 (89.2)	31.0 (87.8)	30.0 (86.0)	28.6 (83.5)	30.4 (86.7)
Mean daily minimum °C (°F)	17.5 (63.5)	17.3 (63.1)	17.7 (63.9)	18.0 (64.4)	18.6 (65.5)	19.1 (66.4)	19.7 (67.5)	19.9 (67.8)	19.6 (67.3)	19.4 (66.9)	18.7 (65.7)	17.9 (64.2)	18.6 (65.5)
Record low °C (°F)	10.5 (50.9)	11.3 (52.3)	11.5 (52.7)	11.5 (52.7)	11.6 (52.9)	11.6 (52.9)	11.5 (52.7)	12.5 (54.5)	11.5 (52.7)	12.6 (54.7)	10.4 (50.7)	10.5 (50.9)	10.4 (50.7)
Average rainfall mm (inches)	15.9 (0.63)	24.8 (0.98)	34.6 (1.36)	70.3 (2.77)	151.4 (5.96)	106.1 (4.18)	63.4 (2.50)	97.0 (3.82)	135.6 (5.34)	115.1 (4.53)	55.0 (2.17)	25.4 (1.00)	894.6 (35.22)
Average rainy days (≥ 1.0 mm)	3.1	3.6	4.1	5.7	10.6	8.6	6.6	7.8	10.6	9.9	5.4	2.8	78.8
Source: NOAA

== Economy ==
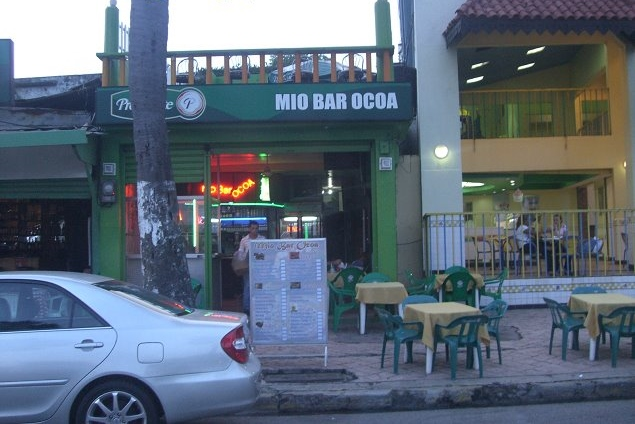
A street in Ocoa

Agriculture is the dominant sector in the economy of the municipality. The main crops are coffee, beans and potatoes. Other vegetables, such as cabbage and carrot are also grown as well as some tropical fruits (avocado and mango). Other economic activities are trade, carpentry workshops, mechanical and some processing of agricultural products.

== Prominent residents of the city ==
- Rafael Sanchez, better known by the alias of Jack Veneno, former professional wrestler and current sub-secretary of sports, was born in Ocoa.
- Félix Estrella, ex-governor and candidate for senator for the province of San José De Ocoa for the PLD.

== See also ==
- Peravia Province
