= Villa Fundación =

Coordinates: 18.28297°N 70.493769°W

- Interactive map of Villa Fundación
- Country: Dominican Republic
- Province: Peravia

Population (2008)
  - Total: 4 858

Villa Fundación is a town in the Peravia province of the Dominican Republic.

== Sources ==
- – World-Gazetteer.com
