= San José de Ocoa Province =

Province of the Dominican Republic

San José de Ocoa
- Province
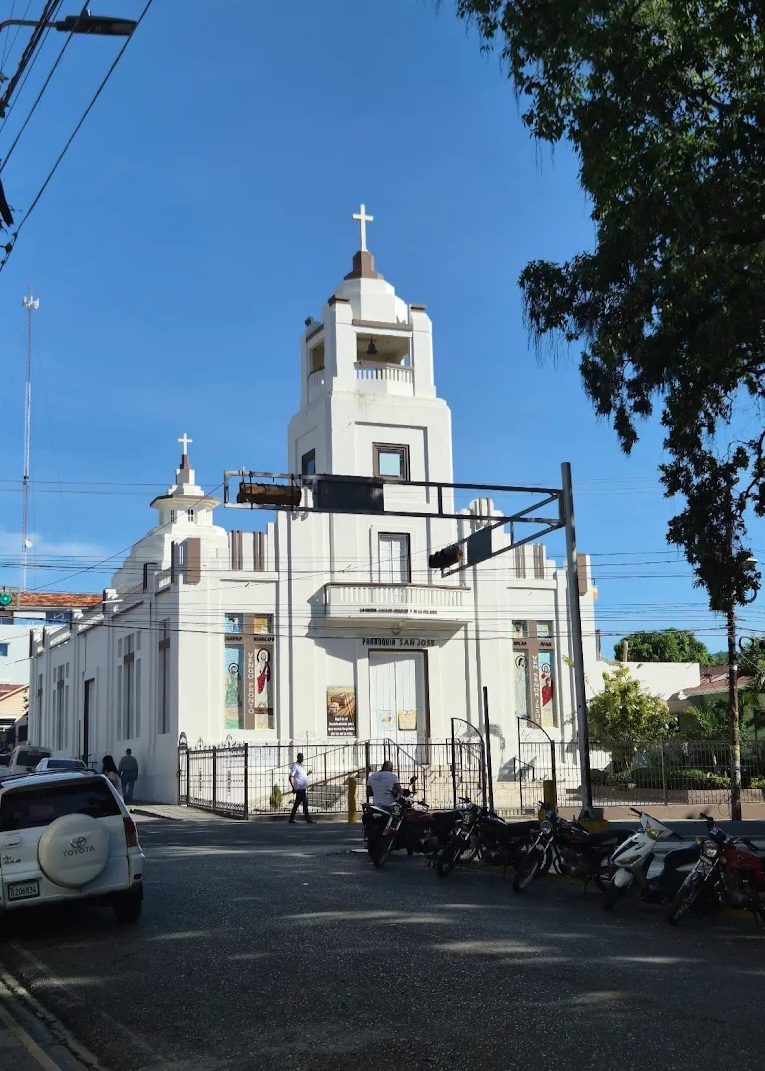
- View of San Jose de Ocoa, Dominican Republic.

- Location of the San José de Ocoa Province
- Coordinates: 18°32′38″N 70°30′28″W
- Country: Dominican Republic
- Province since: 2000
- Capital: San José de Ocoa

Government
  - Type: Subdivisions
  - Body: 3 municipalities 3 municipal districts
  - Congresspersons: 1 Senator; 2 Deputies

Area
  - Total: 853.4 km^{2} (329.5 sq mi)

Population (2022)
  - Total: 69,082
  - Density: 80.95/km^{2} (209.7/sq mi)
- Time zone: UTC-4 (AST)
- Area code: 1-809 1-829 1-849
- ISO 3166-2: DO-31
- Postal Code: 93000

San José de Ocoa (Spanish pronunciation: [ˈsaŋ xoˈse ðe oˈko.a]) is a province in the Dominican Republic. It is spread over an area of 853.4 km^{2} (329.5 sq mi), and has its capital at San José de Ocoa. As per the 2022 census, it had a population of 69,082 inhabitants.

== Etymology ==
San José de Ocoa derives its name from the Ocoa River that passes through the province. San Jose refers to Saint Joseph in Spanish. The place was earlier called as El Maniel.

== Geography ==
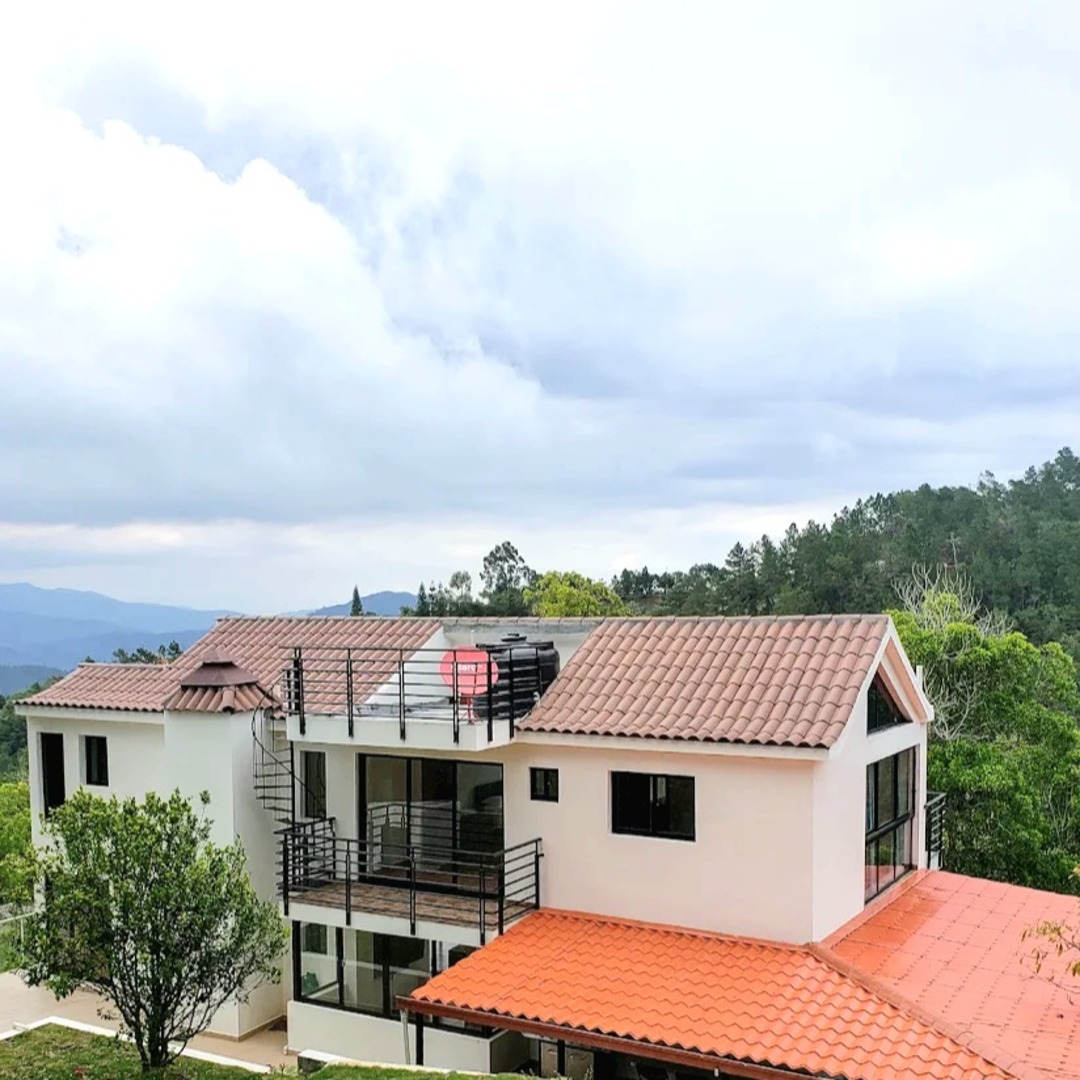
San José de Ocoa Province.

San José de Ocoa is one of the 31 provinces of the Dominican Republic. It is spread over an area of 853.4 km^{2} (329.5 sq mi). It is bordered by the Monseñor Nouel and La Vega Provinces to the north, Peravia and Azua Provinces to the south, San Cristóbal Province to the east, and Azua Province to the west. It is located in the Ocoa river basin.

=== Climate and vegetation ===
The province has a temperate oceanic climate (Köppen climate classification: Cfb). It has an average annual temperature is 25.4 °C (77.7 °F), and receives an average annual rainfall of 5 cm (2.0 in) annually.

About 415.5 km^{2} (160.4 sq mi) land area is covered by forests, which makes up almost half of the area of the province. Broad leaf and coniferous forests make up majority of the area with smaller patches of dry forests. The province has four National Parks, which cover 272.62 km^{2} (105.26 sq mi), approximately one-third of the provincial area. Agricultural lands cover an area of 358.4 km^{2} (138.4 sq mi) in the province.

=== Administration ===
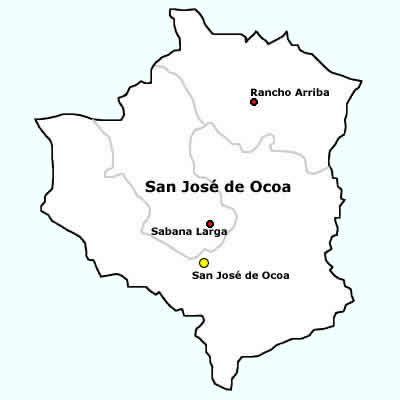
Municipalities of the Province

Its capital city is San José de Ocoa. The province is divided into three municipalities (municipios) and three municipal districts (distrito municipal - D.M.) within them.

- Rancho Arriba
- Sabana Larga
- San José de Ocoa
  - El Pinar (D.M.)
  - La Ciénaga (D.M.)
  - Nizao-Las Auyamas (D.M.)

== Demographics ==
According to the 2022 census, the province had a population of 69,082 inhabitants. The population consisted of 37,220 males (53.9%) and 31,862 females (46.1%). About 22.4% of the population was below the age of 15 years, 67.0% belonged to the age group of 15–64 years, and 10.5% was aged 65 years or older. The province had an urban population of 42,778 inhabitants (61.9%) and a rural population of 26,304 inhabitants (38.1%).

== Economy ==
The economy is mainly based on agriculture and trade. Major agricultural produce include coffee, vegetables, and fruits.
