= Baní =

- Municipality
- Peravia
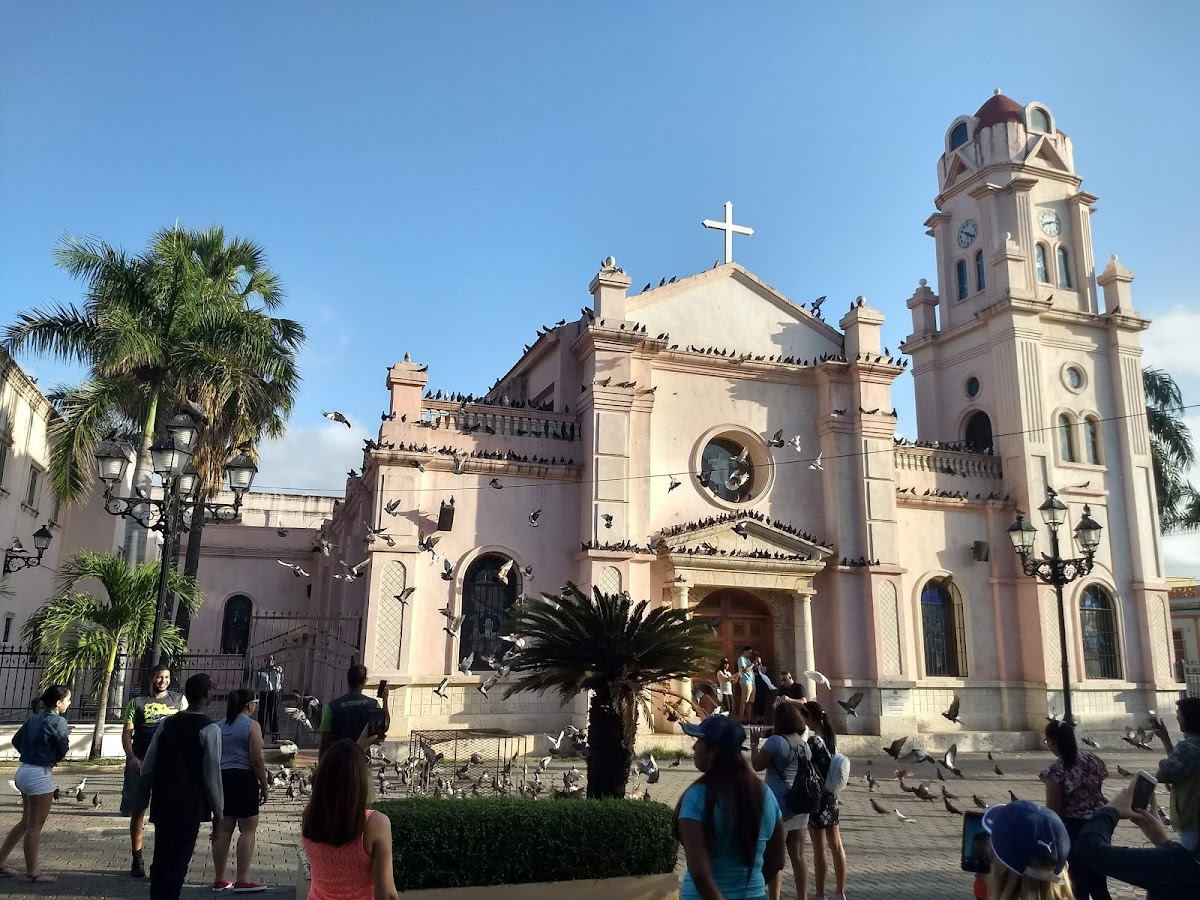
- Baní, Dominican Republic town church

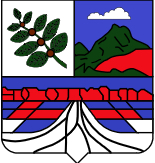
- Flag Coat of arms

- Location within the Dominican Republic
- Coordinates: 18°17′24″N 70°19′48″W
- Country: Dominican Republic
- Province: Peravia
- Founded: 1764 (262 years ago)
- Municipality since: 1845

Area
  - Total: 642.75 km^{2} (248.17 sq mi)
- Elevation: 61 m (200 ft)

Population (2022 census)
  - Total: 158,019
  - Density: 245.85/km^{2} (636.74/sq mi)
  - Urban: 111,658
  - Demonym: Banilejo(a)
- Distance to – Santo Domingo: 65 km
- Municipal Districts: 9
- Climate: Aw

Baní is a capital town of the Peravia Province, Dominican Republic. It is the commercial and manufacturing center in the southern region of Valdesia. The town is located 65 km south of the capital city Santo Domingo.

Baní is the headquarters of the Southcentral General Directorate of the National Police, the Central Regional Directorate of the Ministry of Agriculture and the South Regional Directorate of the General Directorate of Traffic Safety and Land Transport (DIGESETT).

== Overview ==
The city of Bani is the capital of the Peravia province; its residents also know it as the home of poets. The province's population is 169,865 people, with 61,864 living in the Bani metro area. This is a tightly knit community with families and neighborhoods dating back several centuries.

Bani is a Taino word meaning "abundant water." The area was named after an important Taino leader of the Maguana people. He was said to be one of Caonabo's closest allies. But, it wasn't until 1764 when a group of neighbors concerned with their security and safety came together to purchase a property large enough to build their own village in the valley of Bani. Historians set the sum of this purchase as that of “300 pesos fuertes” for a property called Cerro Gordo; the principals were listed as Francisco Baez and Bartolome del Castillo.

== History ==
The settlement by the colonizers in the Baní plain has its origins in the beginning of the 16th century, during the beginning of sugar production. In its vicinity there were several sugar mills near the Nizao and Ocoa rivers. One of the most important mills was founded by Alonso de Suazo, judge of the Royal Court of Santo Domingo, on the banks of the Ocoa River.

From 1680 to 1684 families from the Canary Islands spread throughout the fields nearby Santo Domingo, especially through the territories of today's Baní. After a synod in 1683, a parish, dedicated to Our Lady of Regla, was erected in Baní to serve as a center of worship for the surrounding haciendas and estancias.

According to a book written on the founding families of Baní: Pimentel, Mejia, Rivera, Herrera, Ortiz, Garcia, Ruiz, Lara, Machado, Melo, Castro, Peynado, Sanchez, Dias, Pena, Jimenez, Caraballo, Bernal, Lluberes, Soto, Carvajal, Perez, Olivas, Aybar, Fernandez, Pereyra, Rodriguez, Enriquez, Gutierrez, Rojas, Leon, Gonzalez, Araujo, Nieto, and Cabral. In addition to these, the Báez and the Guerrero were a strong part of the establishment of the city.

The city of Baní was officially founded on 2 March 1764, when a sale contract for 374 Spanish dollars was signed between the parishioners of Baní and the del Castillo and Báez families, the owners of the land in which Baní was to be erected, under the auspices of the Spanish governor Don Manuel de Azlor. Father Manuel Franco de Medina, the parochial vicar, participated in this negotiation, representing the landowners, while General Pablo Romero represented the neighbors.

On the same day, the streets of the town were laid out the parishioners divided the land, laid out the streets, and began to build what would become their town houses, as in that time, people typically used to have a farm and house in the countryside and a house in the most nearby town. Also, the local parish was enlarged by adding a chapel.

In 1789 Baní was an ethnically homogeneous town, with a white population of Canary Islander origin that reached 2,000 inhabitants; the base of its economy was cattle ranching (mainly swine) and logging. Agriculture in that era was non-existent.

Despite the efforts of Governor Azlor, Baní would not have a town council nor autonomy from the city of Santo Domingo until 1810, because during the 1700s the Santo Domingo elite of Basque and Castilian origin disdained the Canary Islander population for their supposed "moral inferiority" and ethnic difference from Peninsular Spaniards. By 1810 much of the old colonial elite had fled to Venezuela due to the 1805 Haitian invasion.

After the Independence, the Central Government Board established a territorial division of the Republic in 1844, which made Baní a commune in the Department of Santo Domingo. In 1844 Baní was the headquarters of the “Ocoa Battalion” unit of the Dominican Army made up of soldiers from the region and composed of two Rifle Companies and one of Hunters.

Baní was connected by land with Santo Domingo through the royal road, being a narrow in a trip that lasted around 12 hours, which communicated with the south of the country through the communities of Sombrero, Matanzas, Sabana Buey and Palmar de Ocoa. To transport goods, the sea route was used using schooners, through coastal ports that existed along the coast.

=== Downtown Baní ===
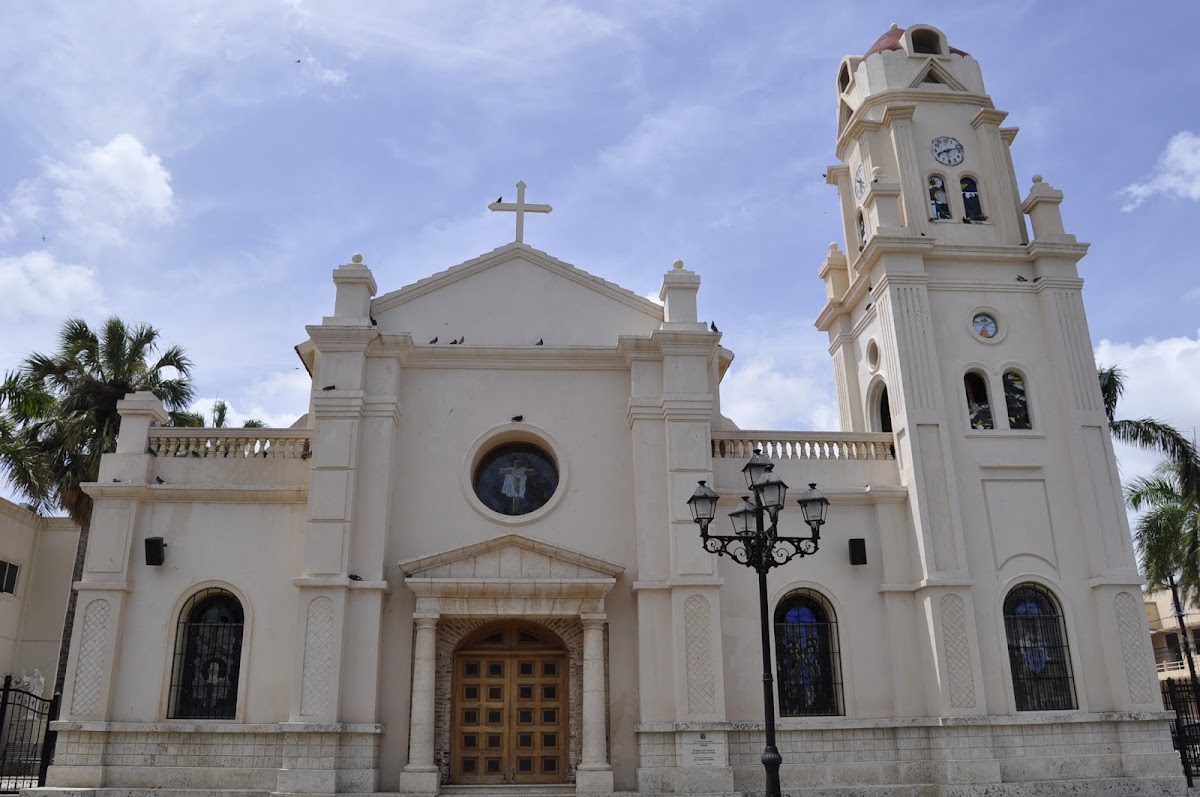

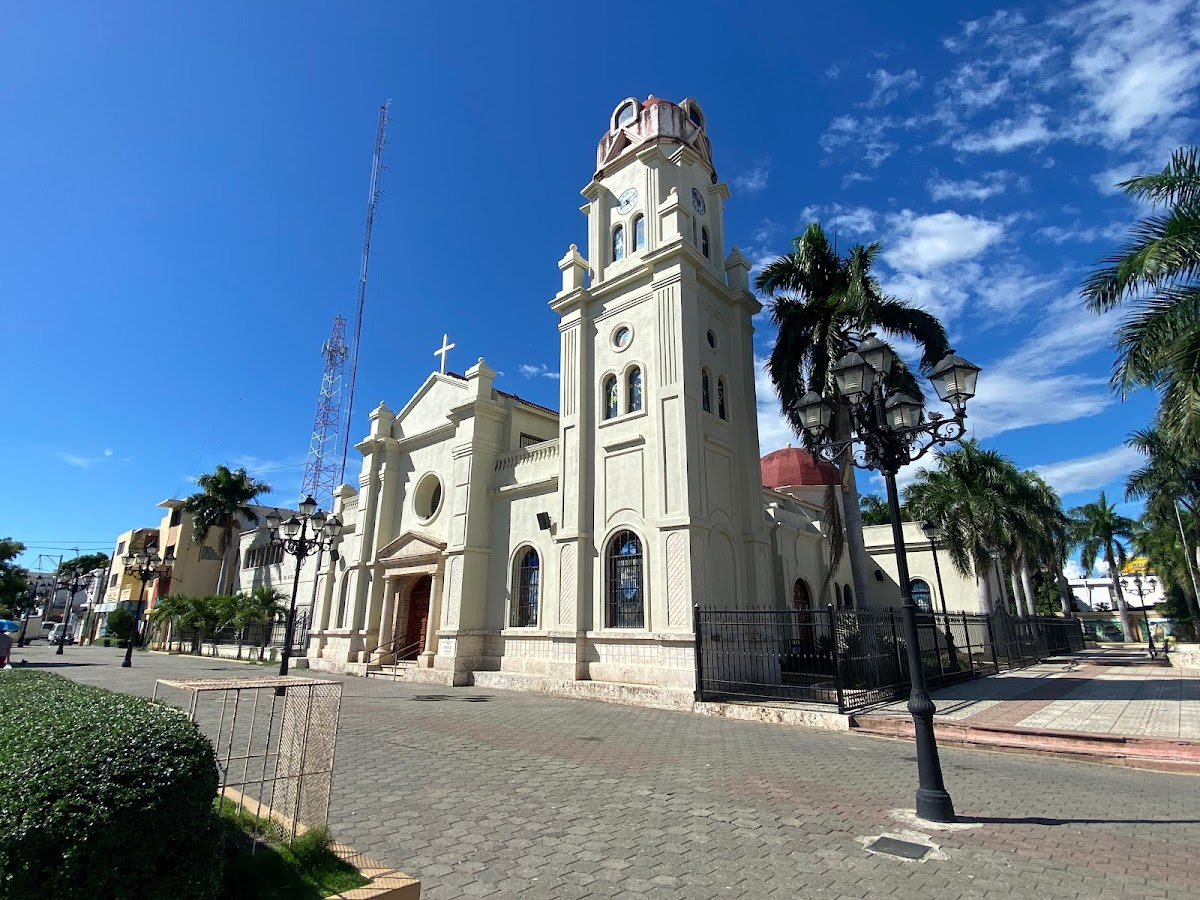

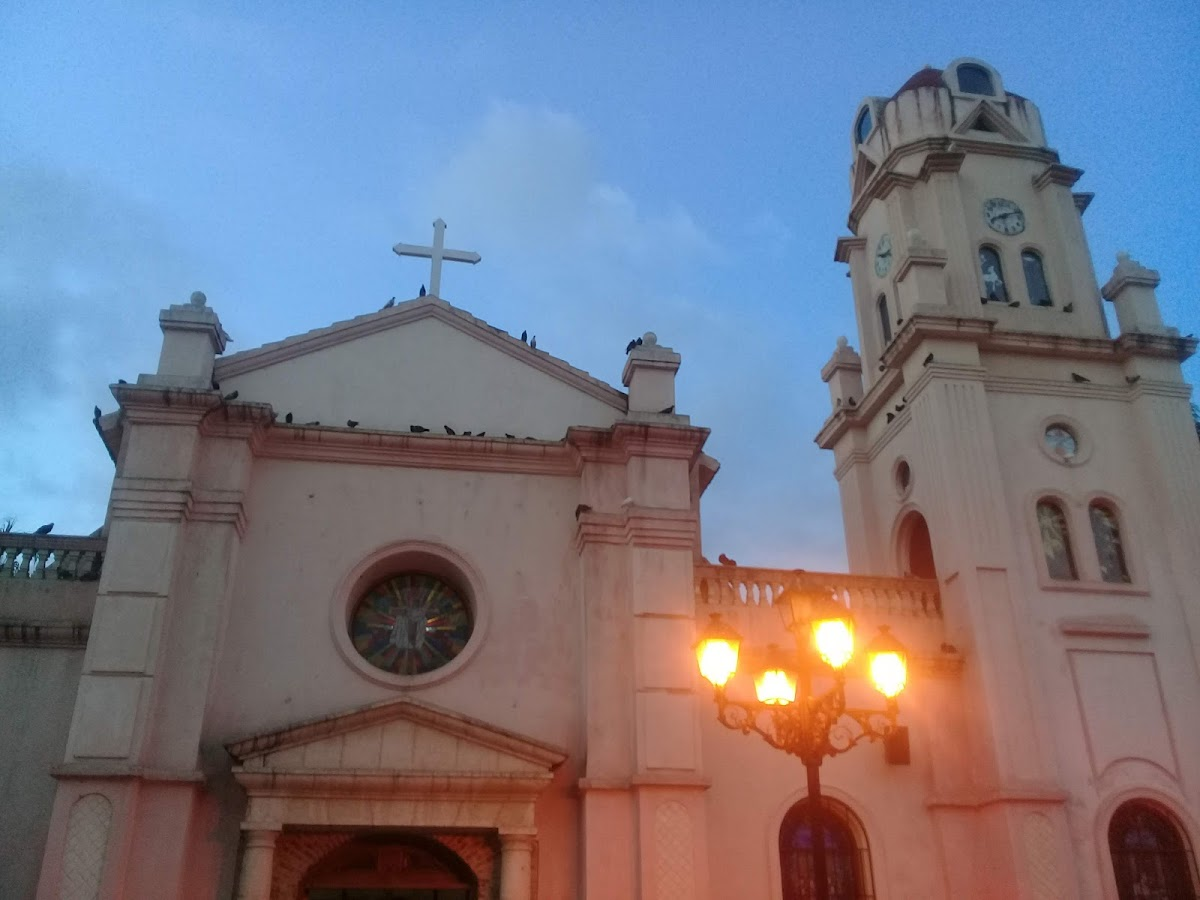

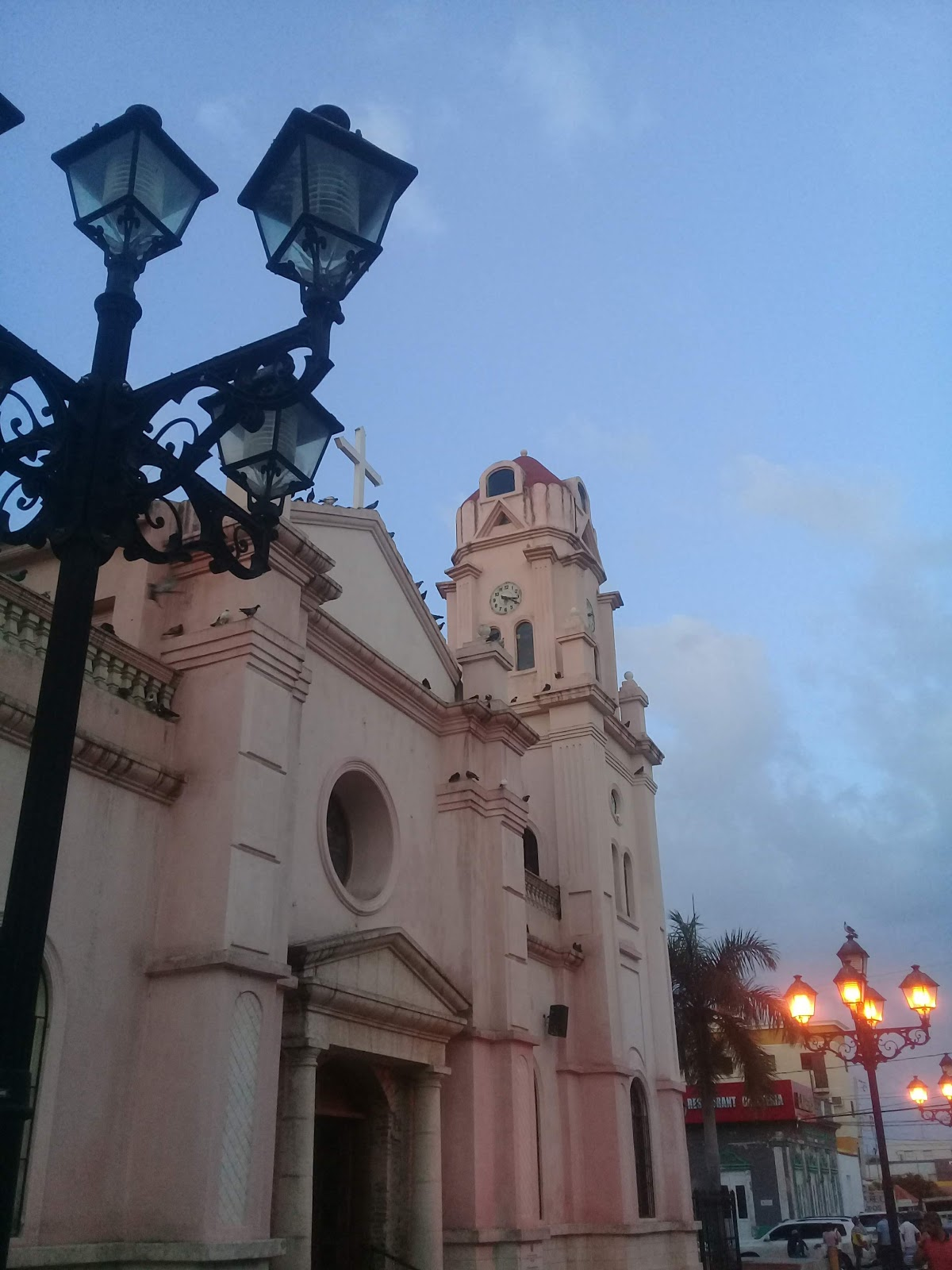

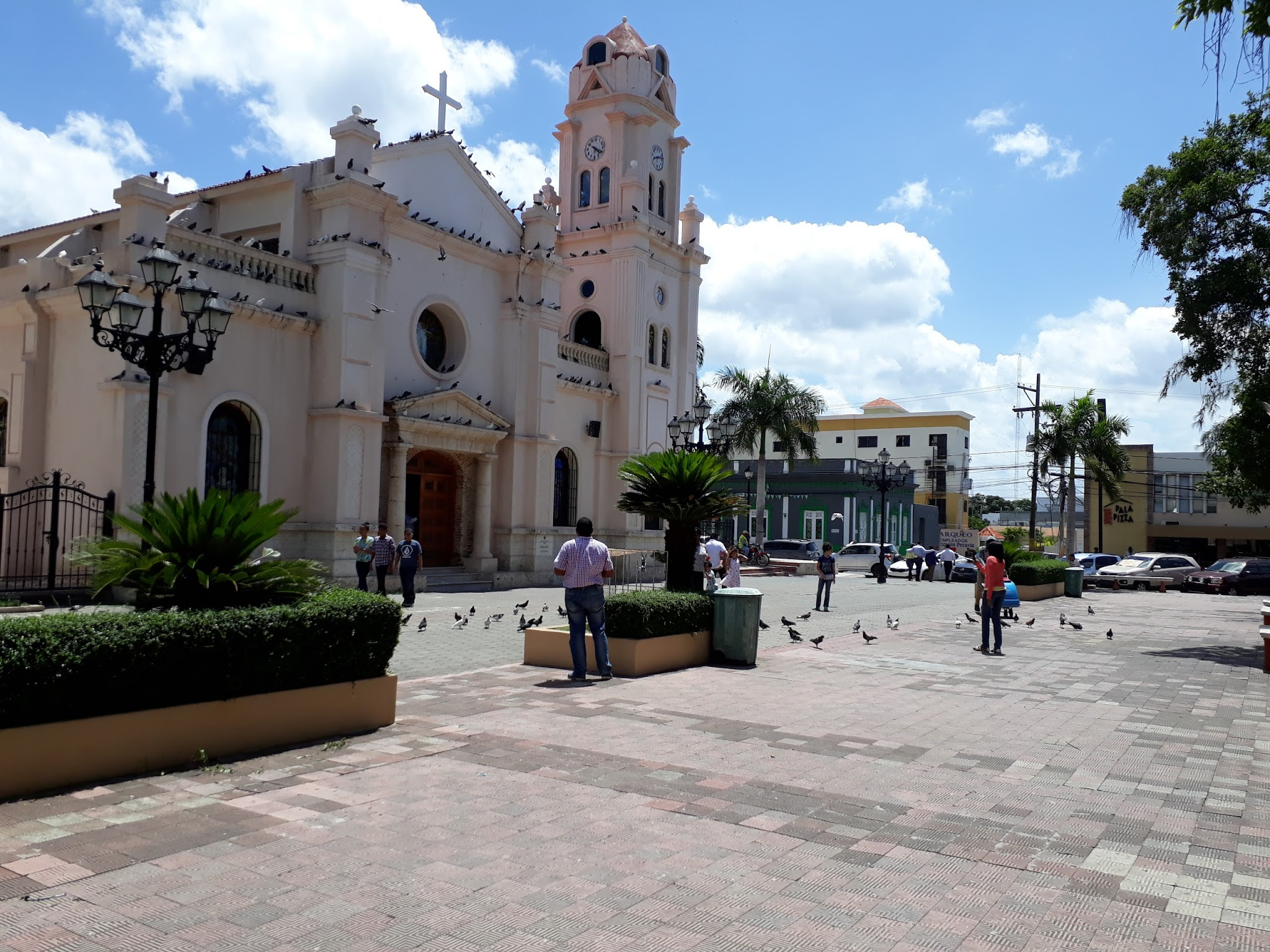

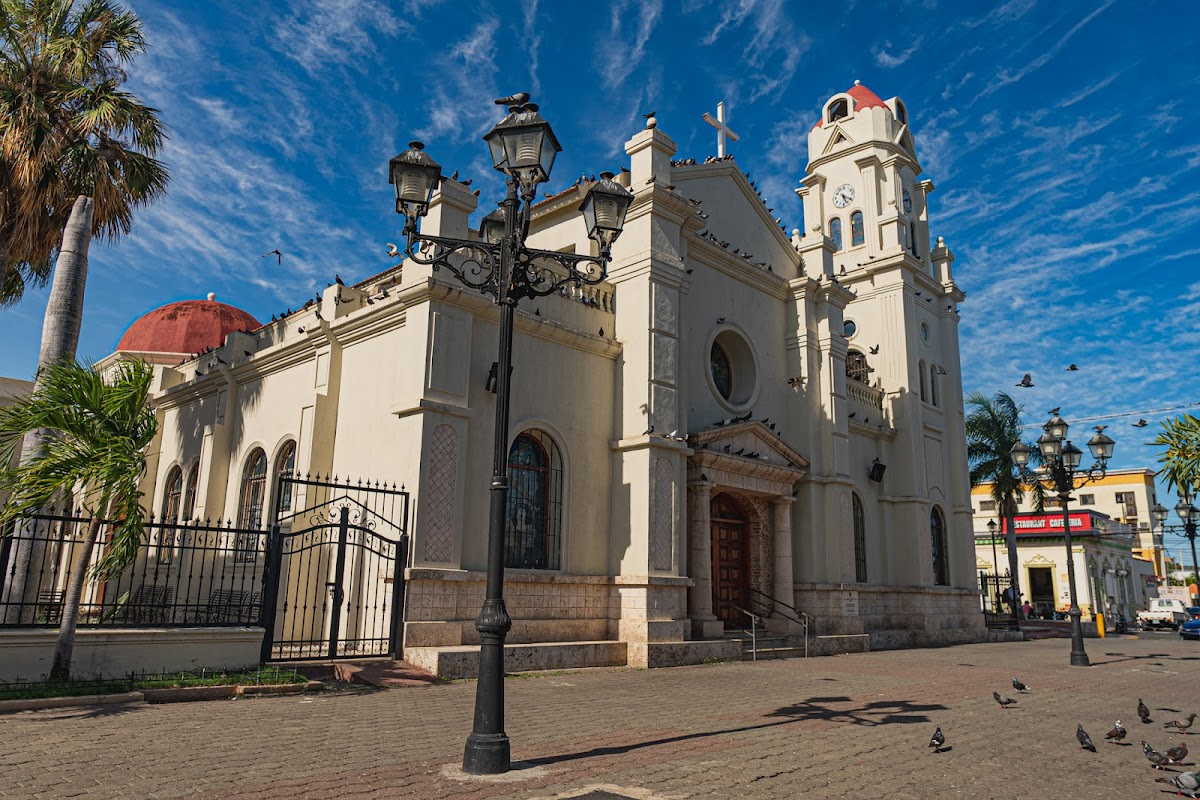

Its culture and customs were most accurately portrayed in the novel Bani o Engracia y Antoñita, written by Francisco Gregorio Billini. The local beach is "Playa Los Almendros" (Almendros Beach,) situated 6 km (3.7 mi) south of the center square. The town's original design follows the classic Spanish square, with a park in the center of the town surrounded by the local church and the local government (mayor's office).

The city's Patron Saint is "Nuestra Señora de Regla (Our Lady of Regla)," whose celebration is on 21 November every year.

Additionally, Baní is surrounded by many smaller towns with many with their own specific identities. One example is Paya, well known around the country for its milk-based candies (most famously "Dulce de Leche," or Milk Candy.) Another is Salinas, a town by the Salinas bay, where salt is produced. Salinas is famous for its Sand Dunes, that make the Dominican Republic the country with the largest sand dunes in the Caribbean.

=== Dunas de Baní ===
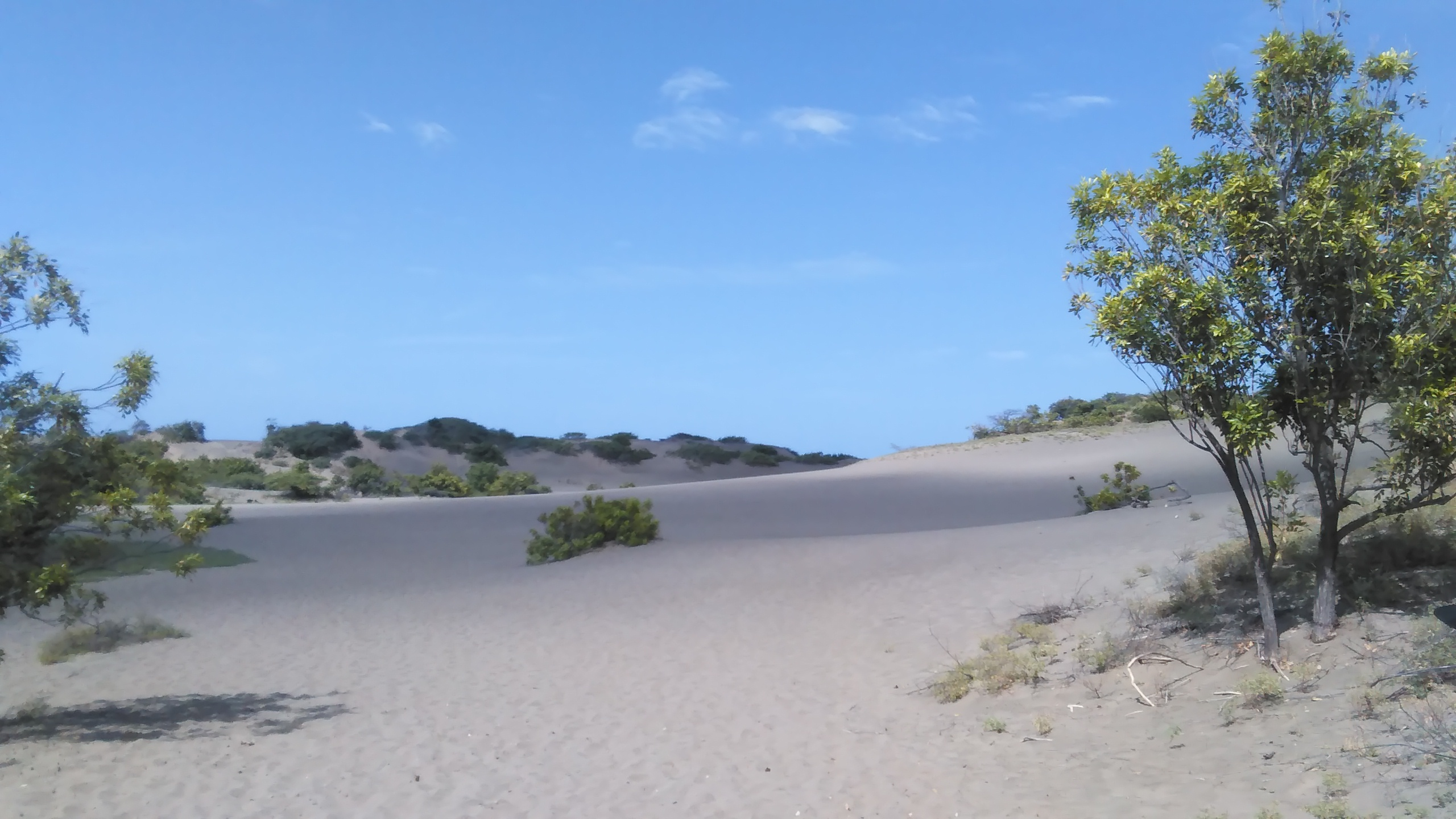

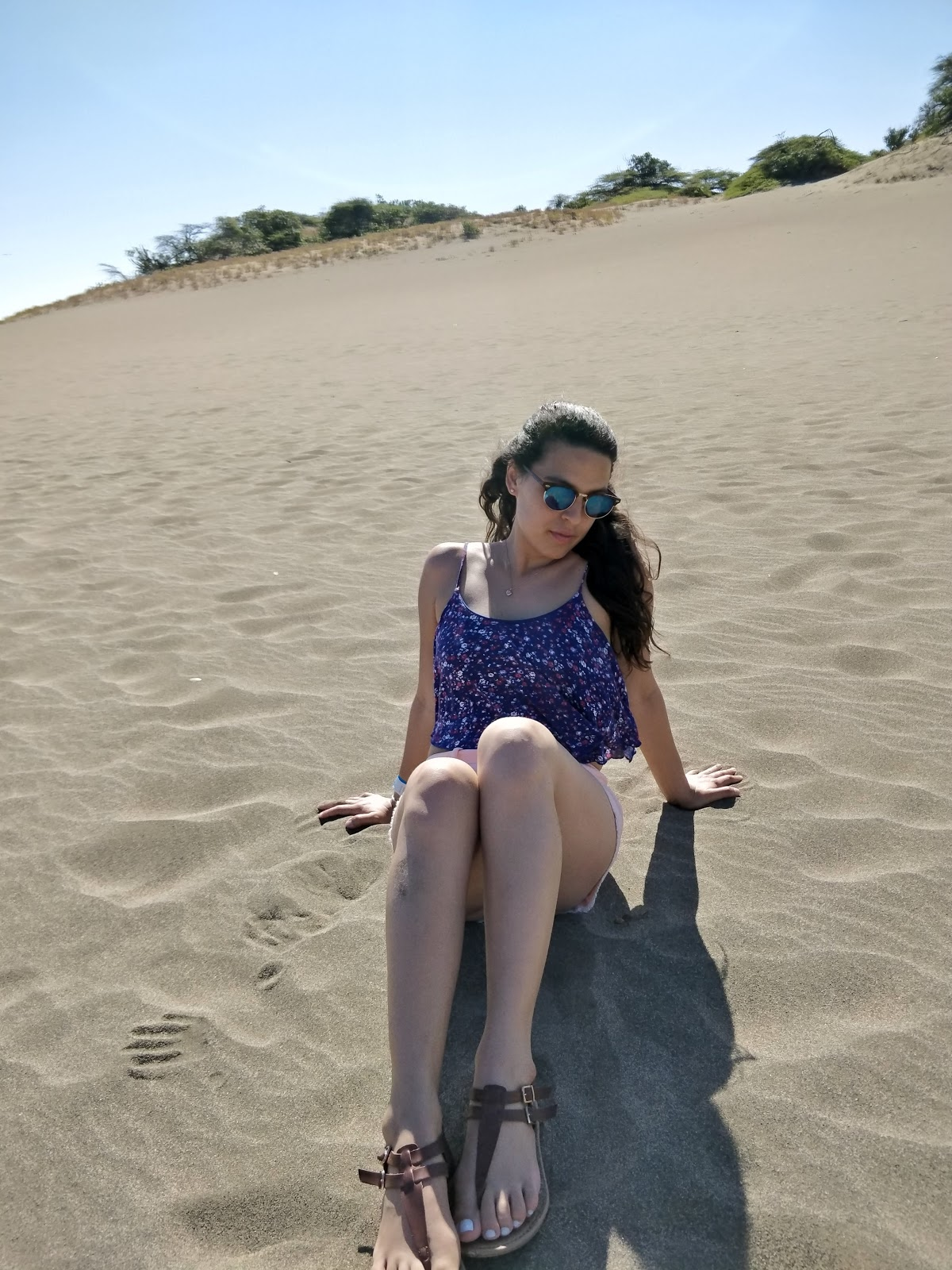

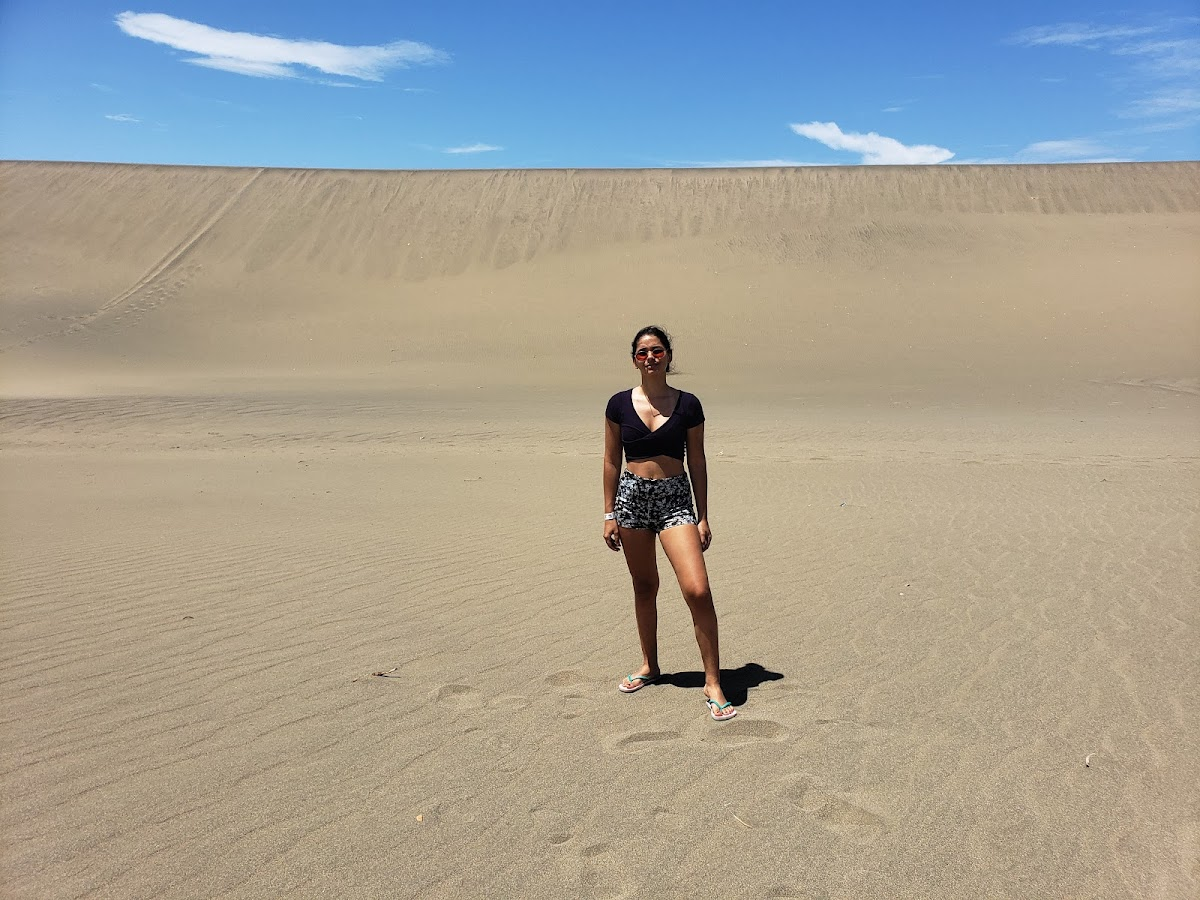

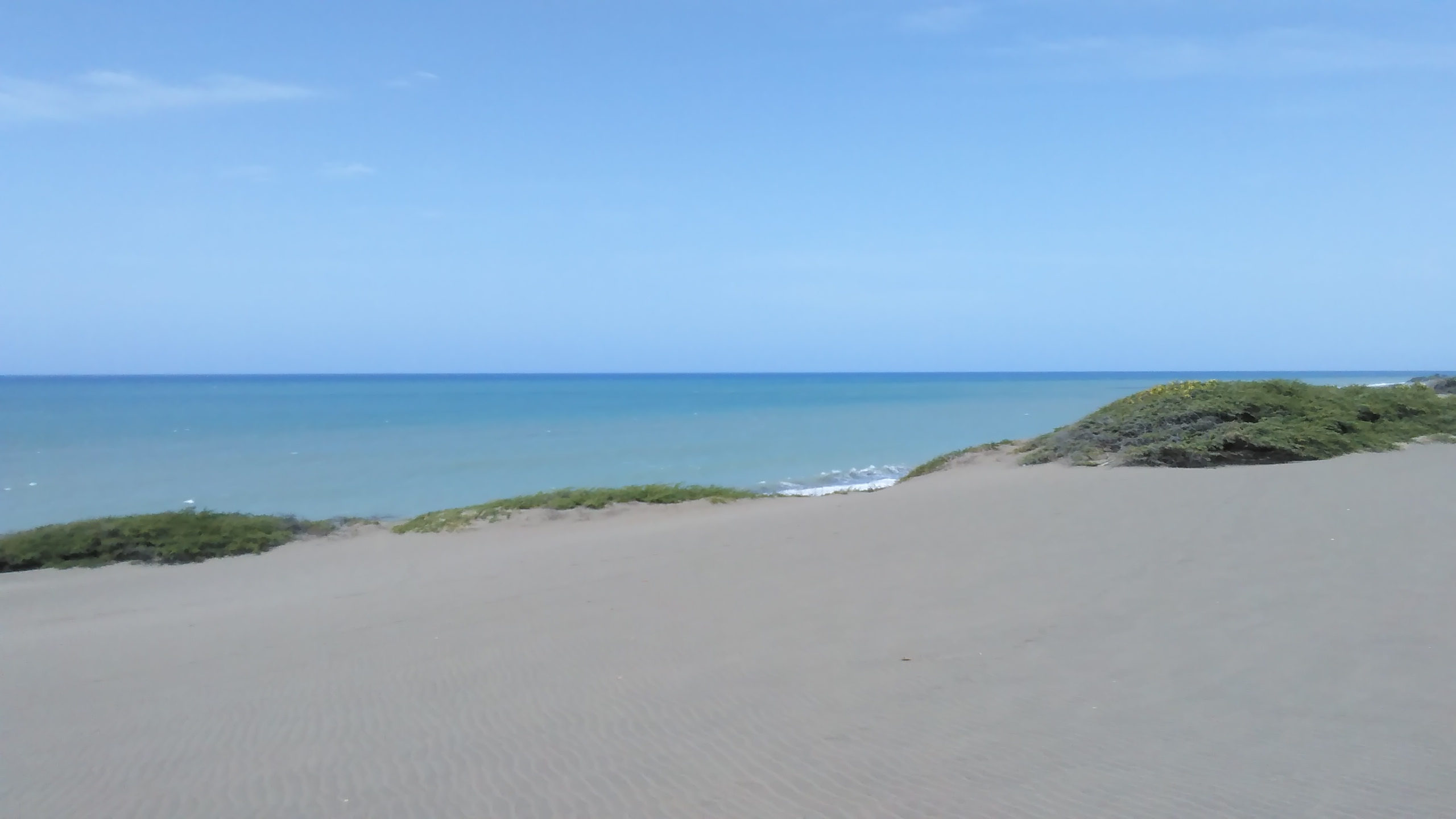

== Climate ==
Owing to its location in the rain shadow of the trade winds, Baní has a relatively dry tropical savanna climate (Köppen Aw) with a pronounced dry season between December and April.

Climate data for Baní (1961–1990)
Month	Jan	Feb	Mar	Apr	May	Jun	Jul	Aug	Sep	Oct	Nov	Dec	Year
Record high °C (°F)	35.5 (95.9)	36.5 (97.7)	36.5 (97.7)	37.2 (99.0)	36.7 (98.1)	36.6 (97.9)	37.0 (98.6)	38.0 (100.4)	38.5 (101.3)	38.0 (100.4)	37.0 (98.6)	37.5 (99.5)	38.5 (101.3)
Mean daily maximum °C (°F)	31.2 (88.2)	31.5 (88.7)	32 (90)	32.6 (90.7)	32.6 (90.7)	32.7 (90.9)	33.5 (92.3)	33.5 (92.3)	33.3 (91.9)	32.8 (91.0)	32.3 (90.1)	31.3 (88.3)	32.4 (90.3)
Mean daily minimum °C (°F)	20.5 (68.9)	20.7 (69.3)	21.5 (70.7)	22.2 (72.0)	22.7 (72.9)	23.2 (73.8)	23.8 (74.8)	23.5 (74.3)	23.0 (73.4)	22.5 (72.5)	21.7 (71.1)	20.6 (69.1)	22.2 (72.0)
Record low °C (°F)	14.0 (57.2)	14.5 (58.1)	15.5 (59.9)	16.0 (60.8)	19.0 (66.2)	19.0 (66.2)	20.0 (68.0)	20.0 (68.0)	20.0 (68.0)	18.0 (64.4)	15.5 (59.9)	15.0 (59.0)	14.0 (57.2)
Average rainfall mm (inches)	24.7 (0.97)	25.7 (1.01)	23.2 (0.91)	36.8 (1.45)	118.6 (4.67)	135.2 (5.32)	79.6 (3.13)	125.0 (4.92)	131.9 (5.19)	137.2 (5.40)	61.0 (2.40)	29.8 (1.17)	928.7 (36.54)
Average rainy days (≥ 1.0 mm)	3.7	3.4	4.0	4.4	9.4	9.4	6.9	8.5	7.8	9.4	5.2	3.5	75.6
Source: NOAA

== Economy ==
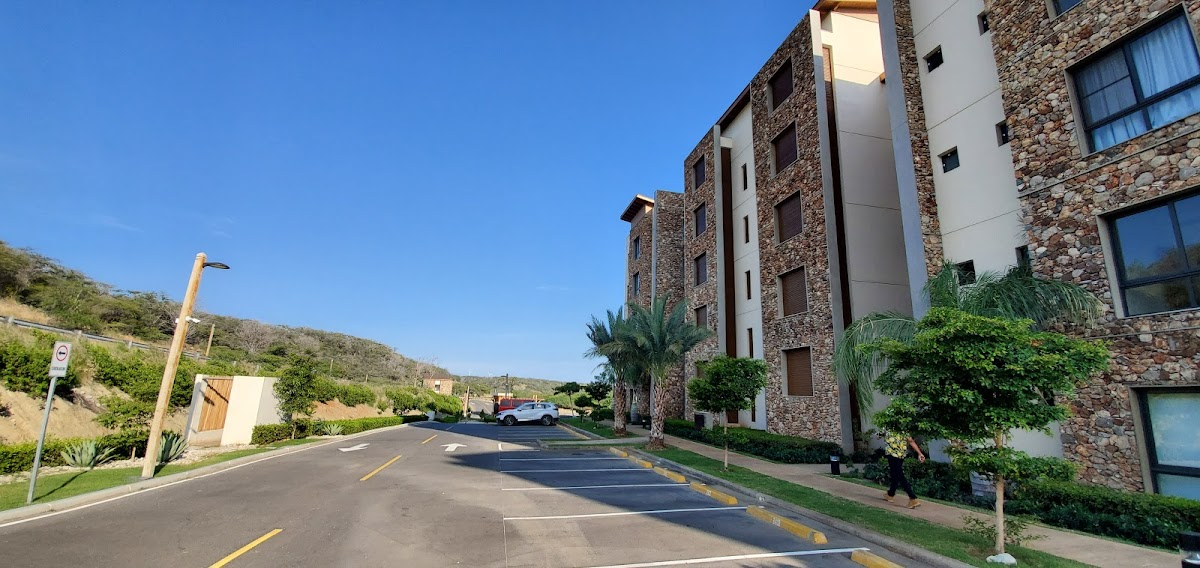
Puntarena beach in Bani, Dominican Republic

Baní's economy is based on agribusiness. In Baní, different products are processed such as coffee, tomato, corn, pigeon peas, onion, coconut, mango, banana, cashew, milk and salt. The main industries are Peravia Industrial (La Famosa), Industrias Banilejas (Induban), La Fosforera del Caribe, the Banileja free zone and the Punta Catalina Thermoelectric Power Plant. There are also different industries in the construction sector.

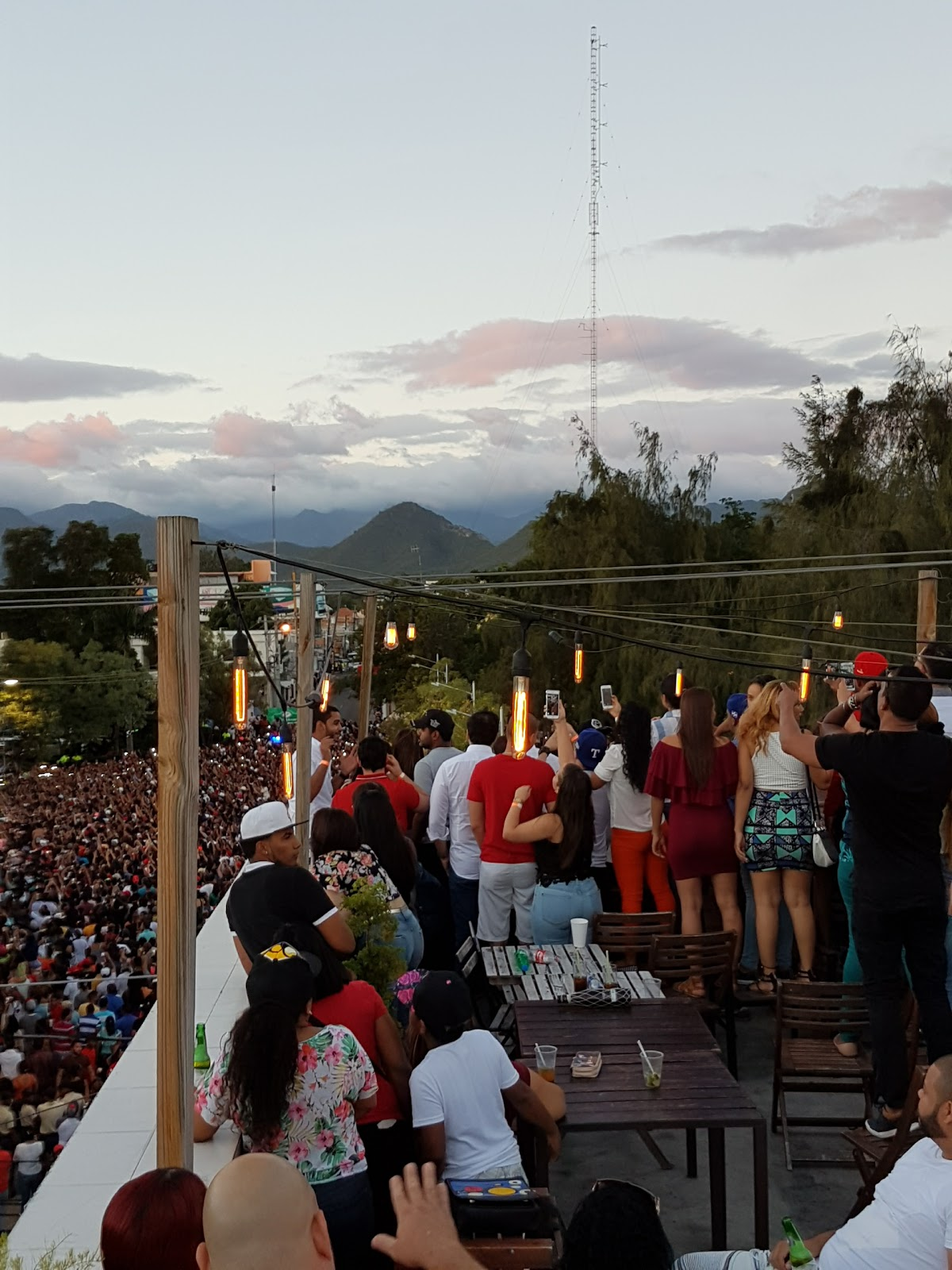
People in Bani, Dominican Republic

Retail trade is also part of the town's economy. The main shopping centers are the La Maravilla network of stores, and supermarkets. The tourism sector includes several hotels and is developing in the province with the construction of two large tourist projects.

The Grupo Peravia Industrial was established in 1963 who are the owners of the La Famosa brand among others and quickly achieved popularity among Dominicans under its founder Don Roberto Serrano Oms. Then there is Industrias Banilejas who own Induban, had also had their origins in Baní under its founder Manuel de Jesús Perelló Báez in 1945. Additionally, Valdesia Coffee produced between the mountains of Peravia, San Cristóbal and Ocoa was recognized as a Protected Designation of Origin by the European Union in 2017.

== People from Baní ==
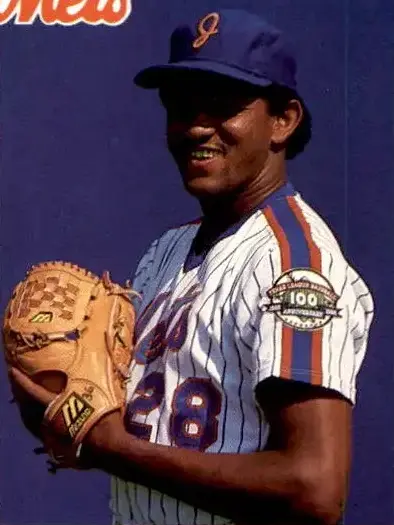
José Bautista

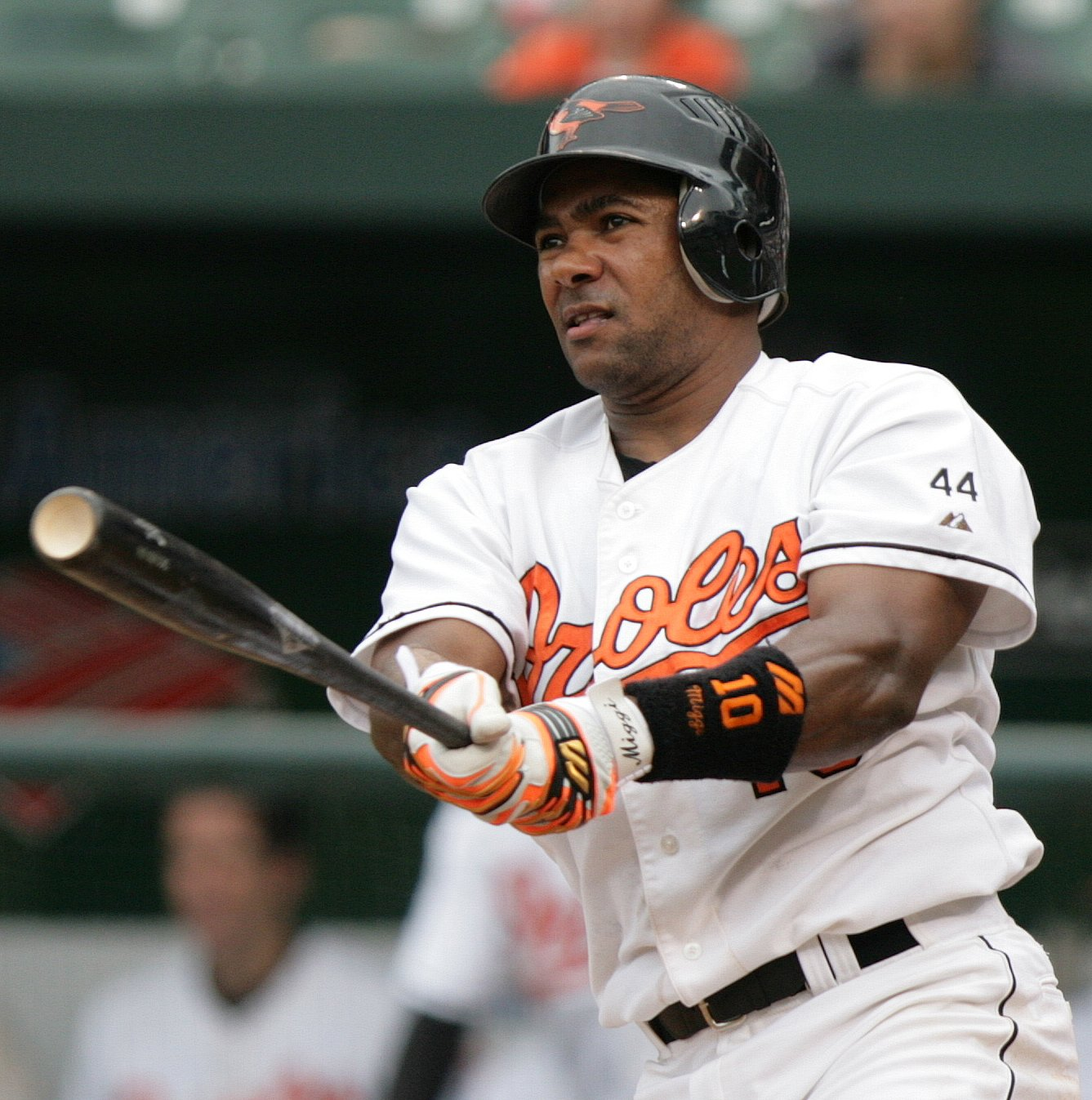
Miguel Tejada

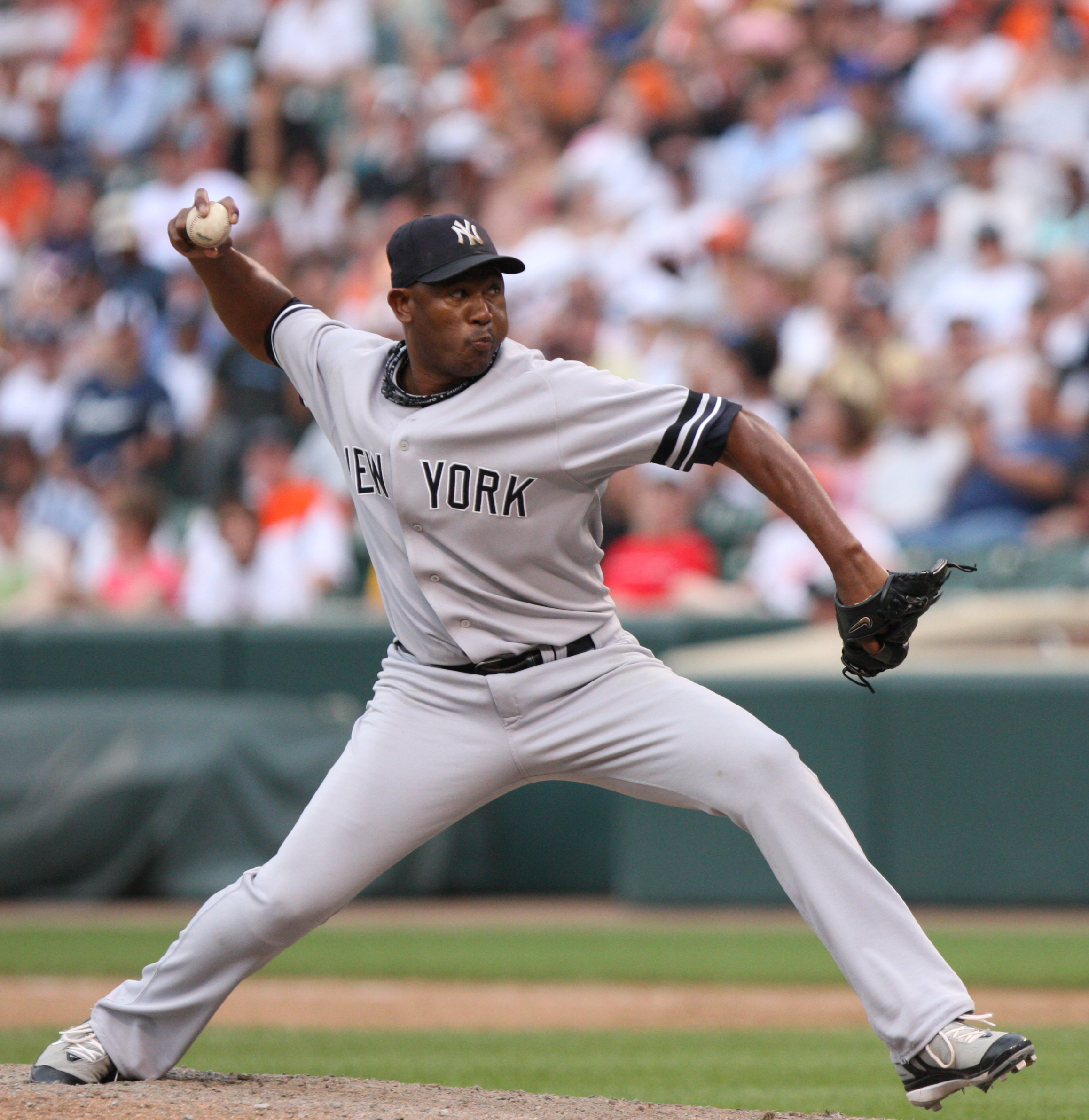
Luis Vizcaino

- Máximo Gómez y Báez – Highest ever ranking officer "Generalissimo" Military leader in Cuba's War of Independence. First man ever nominated for the Cuban presidency in 1901.
- Willy Aybar – Baseball player
- Erick Aybar – Baseball shortstop
- Manny Aybar – Baseball infielder
- Pedro Baez – Baseball player
- José Bautista (pitcher) (born 1964) – Major League Baseball pitcher
- Luis Castillo (born 1992) – Baseball player
- Mario Encarnación – Baseball outfielder
- Wander Franco – Baseball shortstop
- Cristian Guzman – Baseball shortstop
- Gilberto Hernández Ortega – painter
- Rafael Landestoy – Baseball player
- Juan Melo - Baseball second baseman
- Timo Pérez – Baseball outfielder
- José Ramírez (born 1992) - Baseball third baseman
- Santaye – singer-songwriter
- Mario Melvin Soto – Baseball pitcher
- Miguel Tejada (born 1974) – Baseball pitcher
- Robinson Tejeda – Baseball pitcher
- Juan Uribe – Baseball player
- Carlos Valdéz – Baseball player
- Luis Vizcaíno (born 1974) – Baseball pitcher

== Miscellaneous ==
- Baní is known for its Mangos "mamellitos"
- Baní is one of the places where the Pulitzer Prize winning novel The Brief Wondrous Life of Oscar Wao takes place.
