= Sabana Buey =

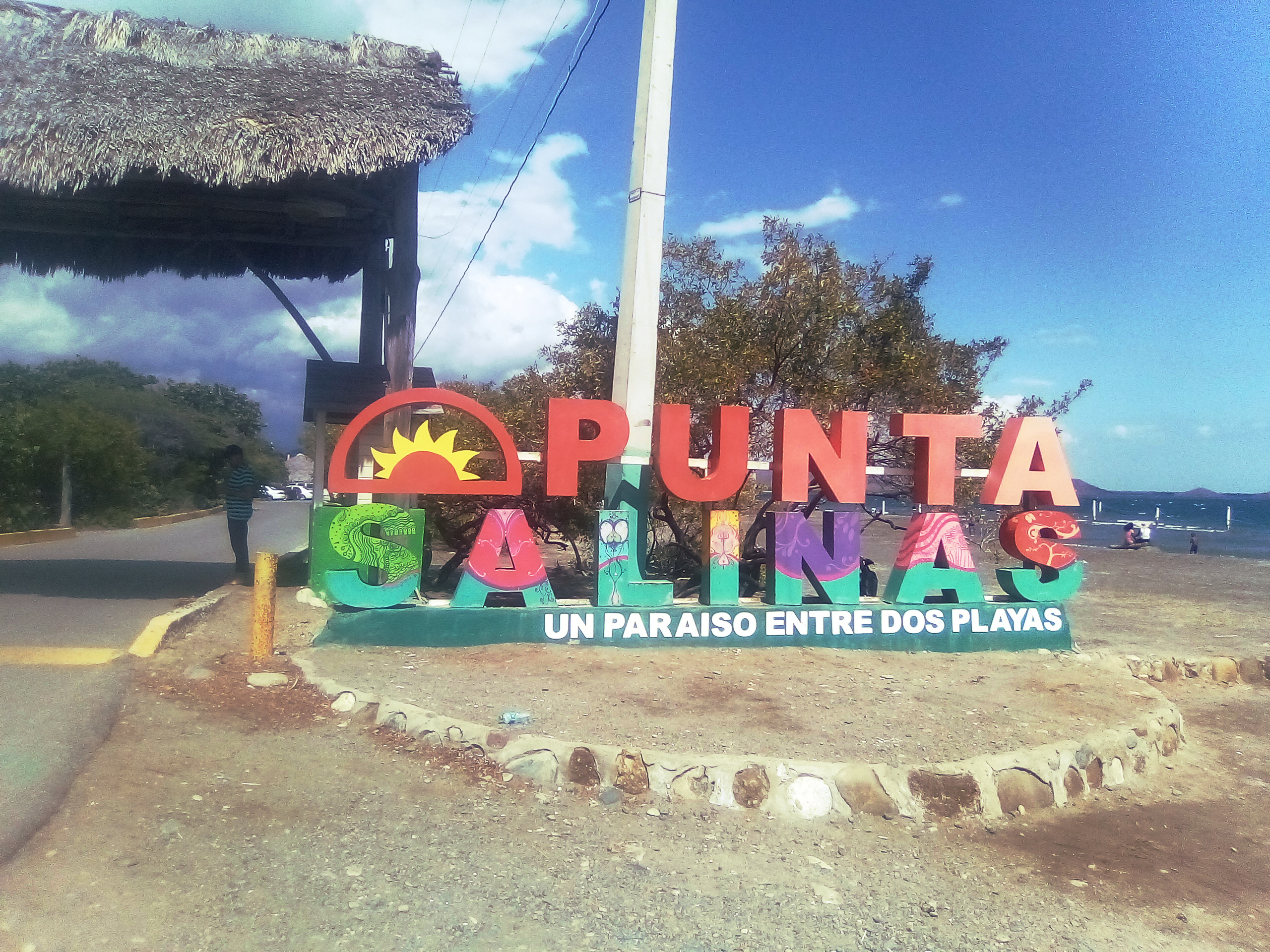
- Punta Salinas

- Location within the Dominican Republic
- Coordinates: 18°16′12″N 70°31′48″W
- Country: Dominican Republic
- Province: Peravia

Government
  - Alcalde (Mayor): Rosa Maria Sanchez

Population (2008)
  - Total: 2,453
- Website: www.sabanabueybani.com

Sabana Buey is a town in the Peravia province of the Dominican Republic. The current mayor of this town is Rosa Maria Sanchez.

== Sources ==
- – World-Gazetteer.com
