= Peravia Province =

Province of the Dominican Republic

Peravia
- Province
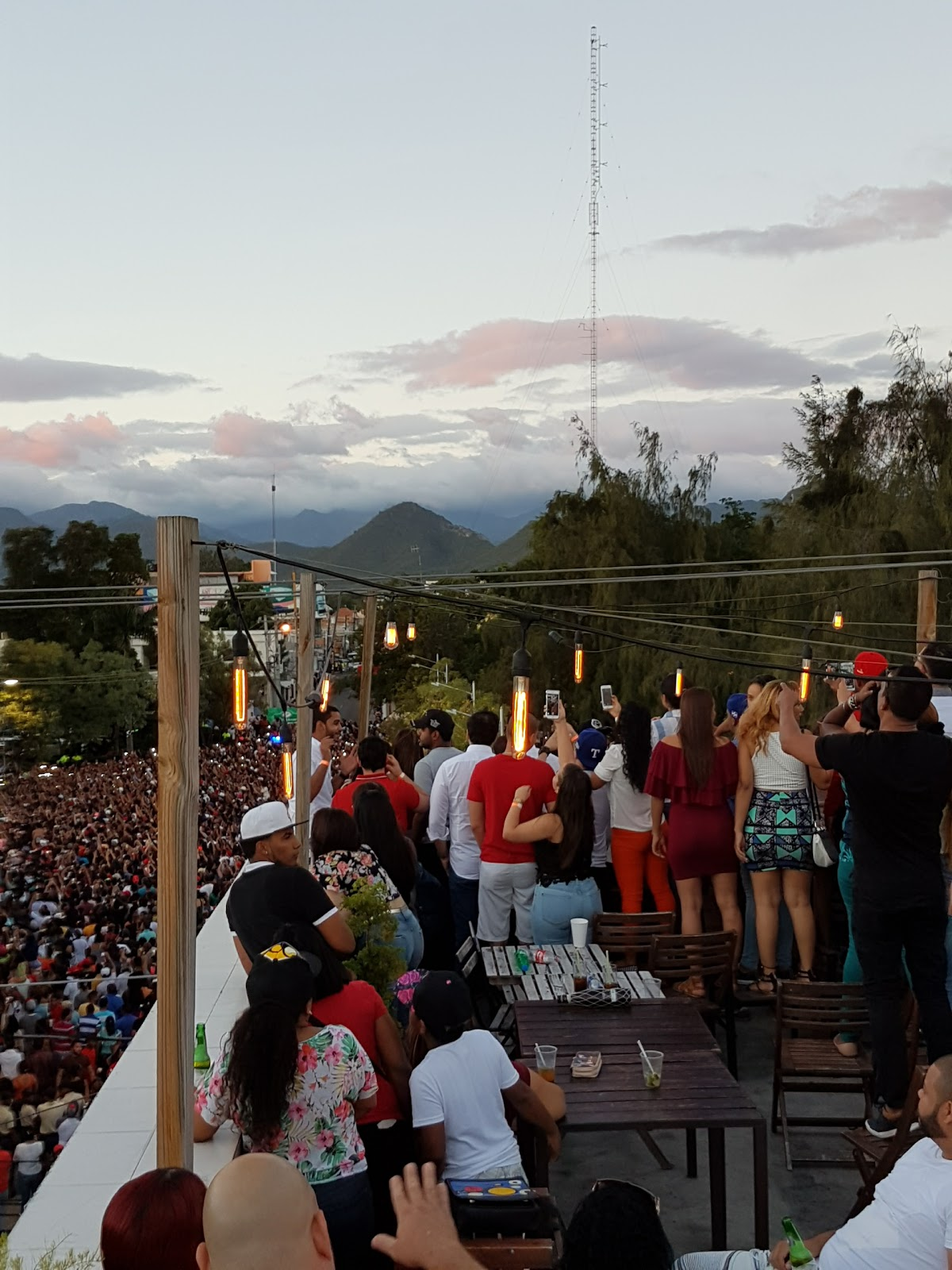
- People in Bani, Dominican Republic town

- Location of the Peravia Province
- Coordinates: 18°19′48″N 70°22′11″W
- Country: Dominican Republic
- Province since: 1944
- Capital: Baní

Government
  - Type: Subdivisions
  - Body: 3 municipalities 10 municipal districts
  - Congresspersons: 1 Senator; 3 Deputies

Area
  - Total: 792.33 km^{2} (305.92 sq mi)

Population (2014)
  - Total: 217,241
  - Density: 274.18/km^{2} (710.12/sq mi)
- Time zone: UTC-4 (AST)
- Area code: 1-809 1-829 1-849
- ISO 3166-2: DO-17
- Postal Code: 94000

Peravia (Spanish pronunciation: [peˈɾaβja]) is a province in the southern region of the Dominican Republic. Located on the country's Caribbean coast which it is in the south, it is divided in 13 units (three municipalities and 10 municipal districts), while Baní is the province's capital. Clockwise, Peravia is bordered by other provinces starting with Azua to the west, San José de Ocoa to the north, and San Cristóbal to the east. Before January 1, 2002, it was included in what is the new province called San José de Ocoa, and published statistics and maps generally relate it to the old, larger, Peravia.

It is named after the Peravia Valley. Along the Azua Province, Peravia is characterized by its dry climate and its dunes that surround the coast. One popular attraction is the Salinas beach, which recently has grown to be a popular tourist destination with a developed town that has shops and hotels.

== Municipalities and municipal districts ==
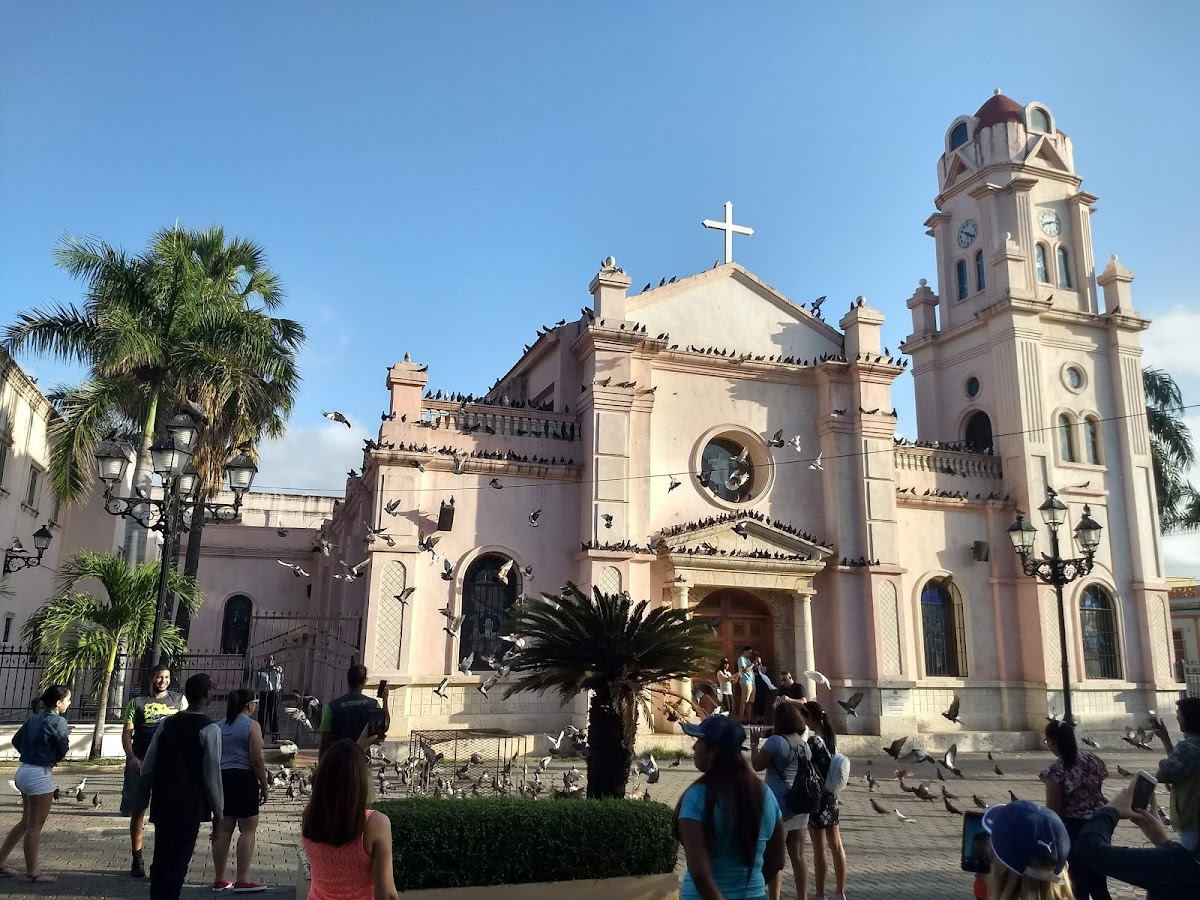
Bani, Peravia, Dominican Republic town center

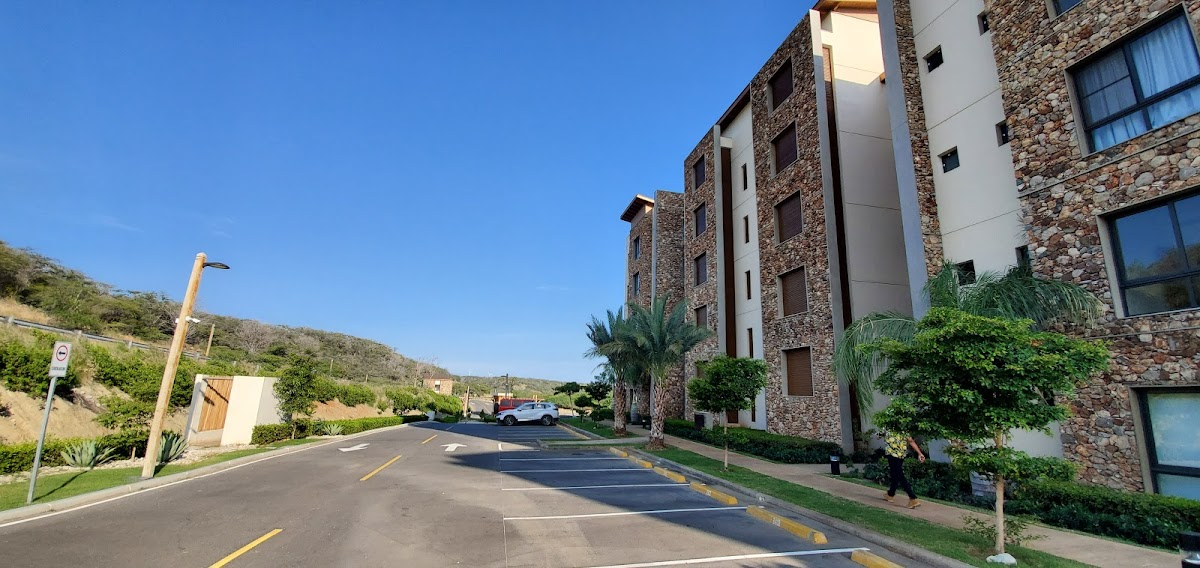
Puntarena in Peravia, Dominican Republic

The province as of June 20, 2006, is divided into the following municipalities (municipios) and municipal districts (distrito municipal - D.M.) within them:

- Baní
  - Catalina (D.M.)
  - El Carretón (D.M.)
  - El Limonal (D.M.)
  - Paya (D.M.)
  - Villa Fundación (D.M.)
- Matanzas
  - Sabana Buey (D.M.)
  - Villa Sombrero (D.M.)
- Nizao
  - Pizarrete (D.M.)
  - Santana (D.M.)

The following is a sortable table of the municipalities and municipal districts with population figures as of the 2012 census. Urban population are those living in the seats (cabeceras literally heads) of municipalities or of municipal districts. Rural population are those living in the districts (Secciones literally sections) and neighborhoods (Parajes literally places) outside of them.

Name	Total population	Urban population	Rural population
Baní	145,595	120,354	25,241
Matanzas	35,414	21,441	13,973
Nizao	36,232	10,545	25,687
Peravia province	217,241	152,340	64,901

For comparison with the municipalities and municipal districts of other provinces see the list of municipalities and municipal districts of the Dominican Republic.

== Geography ==
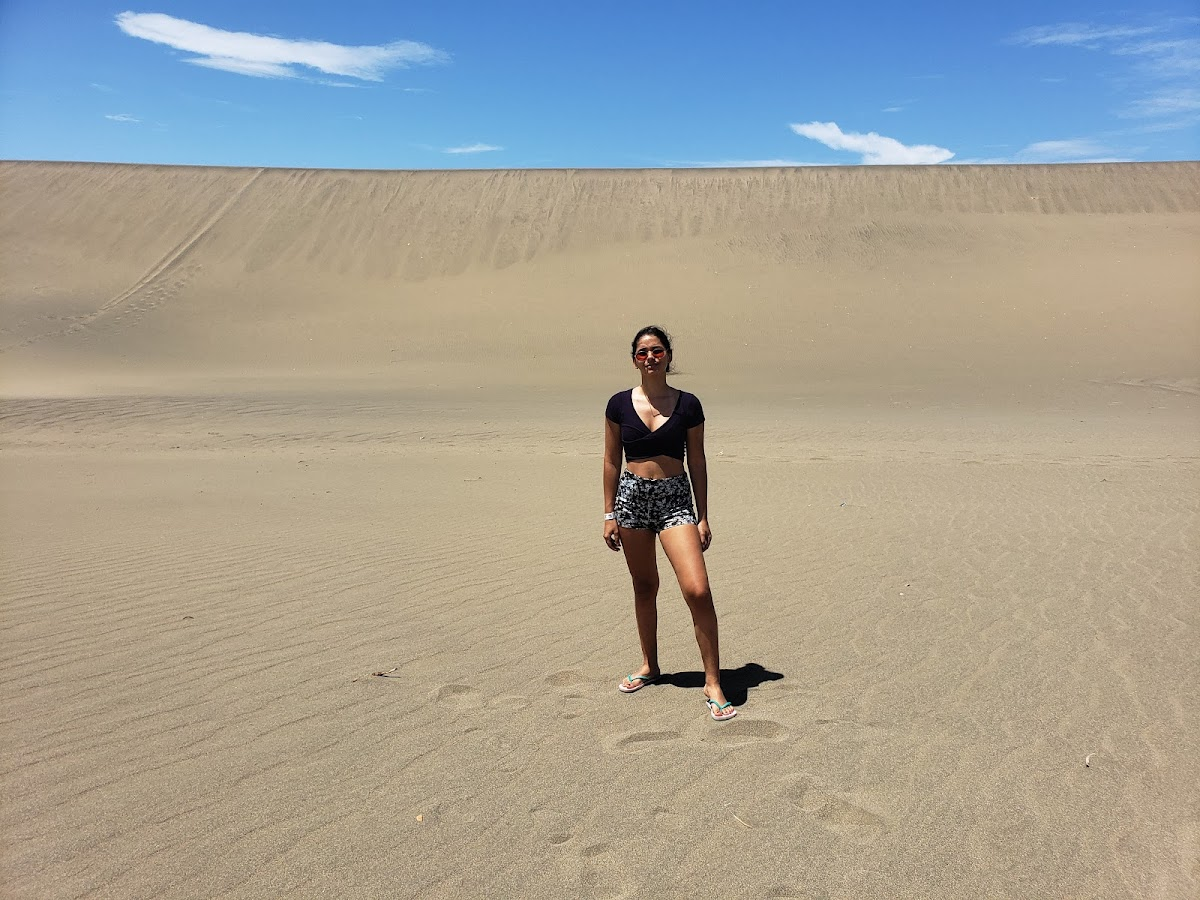
Dunas de Bani, Peravia, Dominican Republic

Salinas

Peravia province has an area of 792.33 km2 (305.92 sq mi). It is located in the southern region, it borders the San José de Ocoa province to the north, to the east it borders San Cristóbal, to the west the province of Azua and to the south it has coasts on the Caribbean Sea. The most important rivers that cross the province are the Nizao, the Ocoa and the Baní.

The province is made up of two main regions, the Central Mountain Range and the Coastal Plain of the Caribbean. The Central Mountain Range, known in the region as the Sierra de Ocoa, extends to the north and west of the province, where the hills of La Barbacoa are located at 1,743 meters above sea level, Valdesia with 1,723 meters above sea level, Firme Rodríguez, Los Guayuyos and Los Naranjos, El Manaclar with 1,400 meters above sea level, where most of the repeaters of the country's telephone companies are located and the surveillance radar of the south of the country.

La Barbacoa was declared a Scientific Reserve for the conservation of hydro-graphic basins and sources of streams and source aquifers such as the Rio Nizao. In the south of the province, in Las Calderas Bay, is the Los Corbanitos beach, Las Dunas, Salinas de Puerto Hermoso beach and the Las Caldera Naval Base of the Dominican Navy. About 80% of the Province is dominated by a dry forest, especially in its southern zone, in the north there are different types of humid forests.

== Economy ==
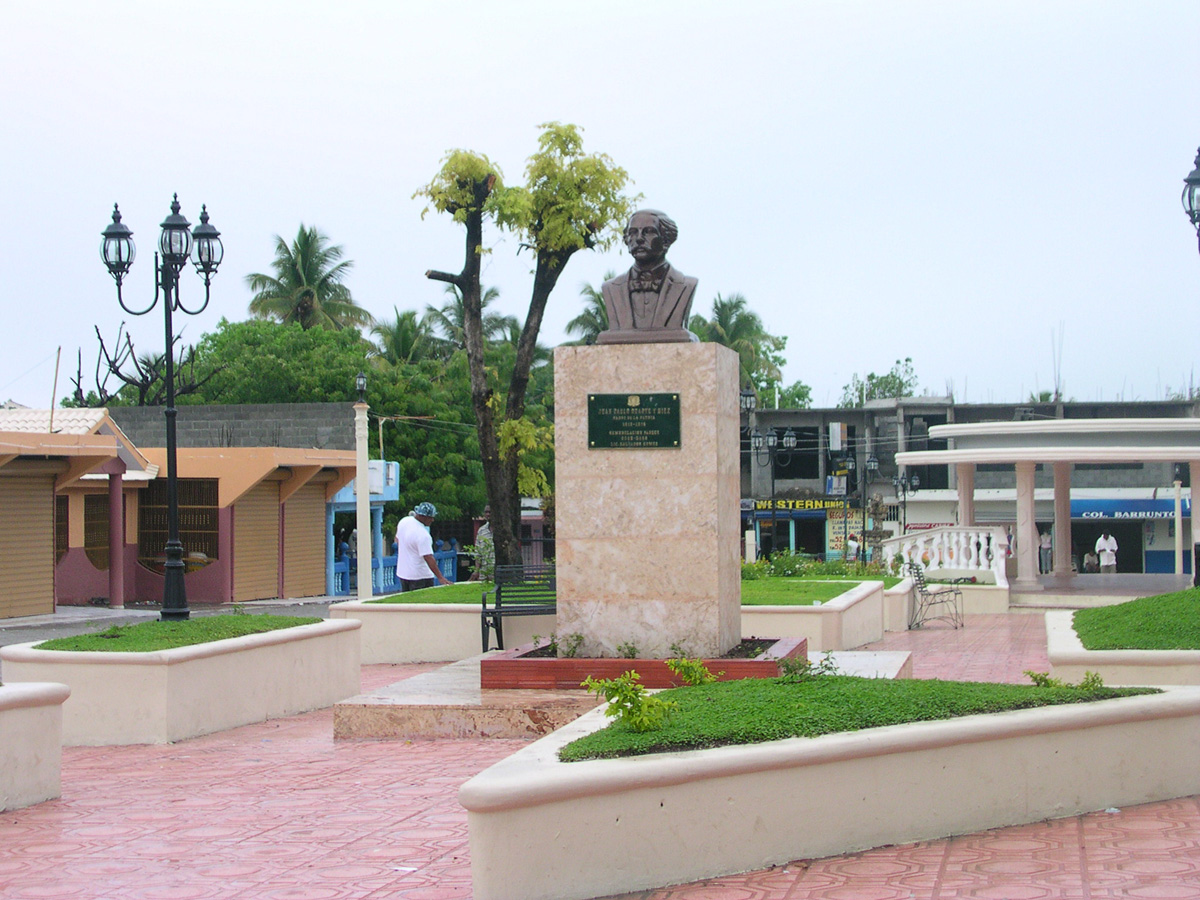
Nizao

The province has a diverse agricultural industry, producing vegetables (tomato, onion, etc.), fruit trees, coffee, onion, coconut, mango, lechoza, cashew, pigeon pea, rice and bananas. Beef farming of cattle and goats is also an important source of income, as well as fishing in the southern Caribbean coast.

Salt production in Las Salinas is produced on terraces through the evaporation of sea water, it is currently under the ownership of the Municipal Council of Baní. Currently a source of employment in the Province is the Punta Catalina Thermoelectric Power Plant.
