= Altamira, Dominican Republic =

Altamira
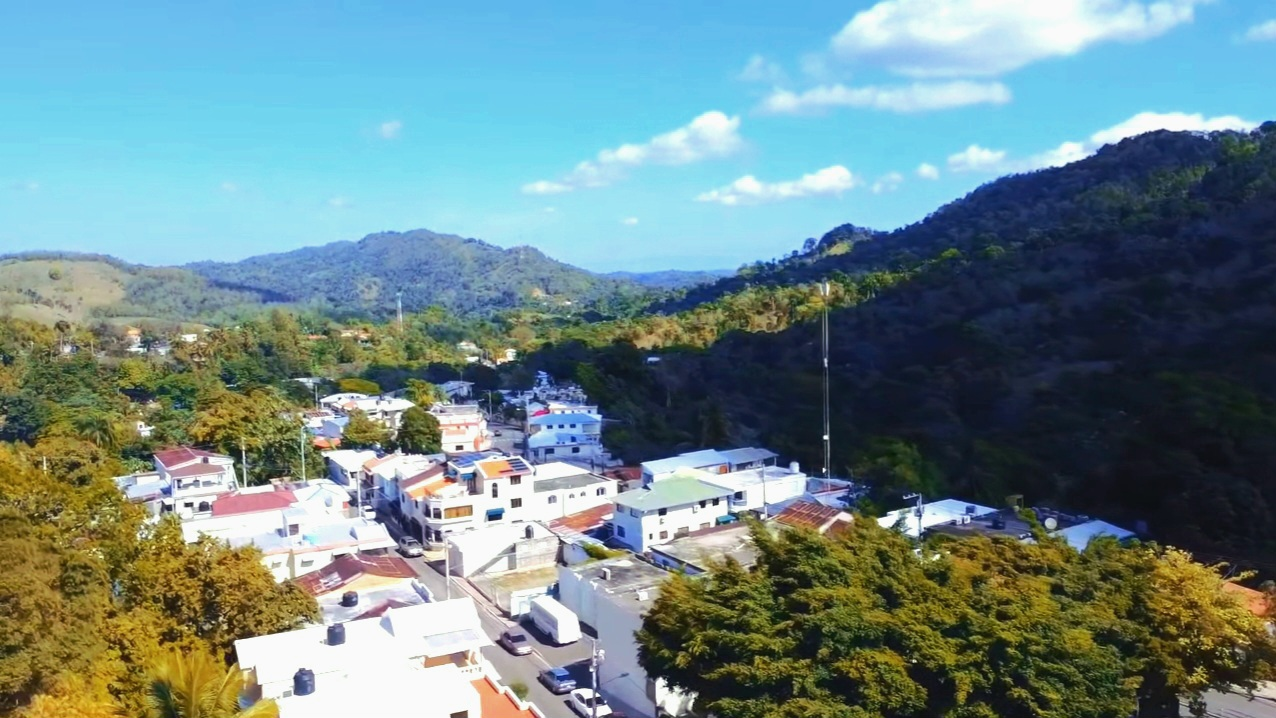
- View of Altamira

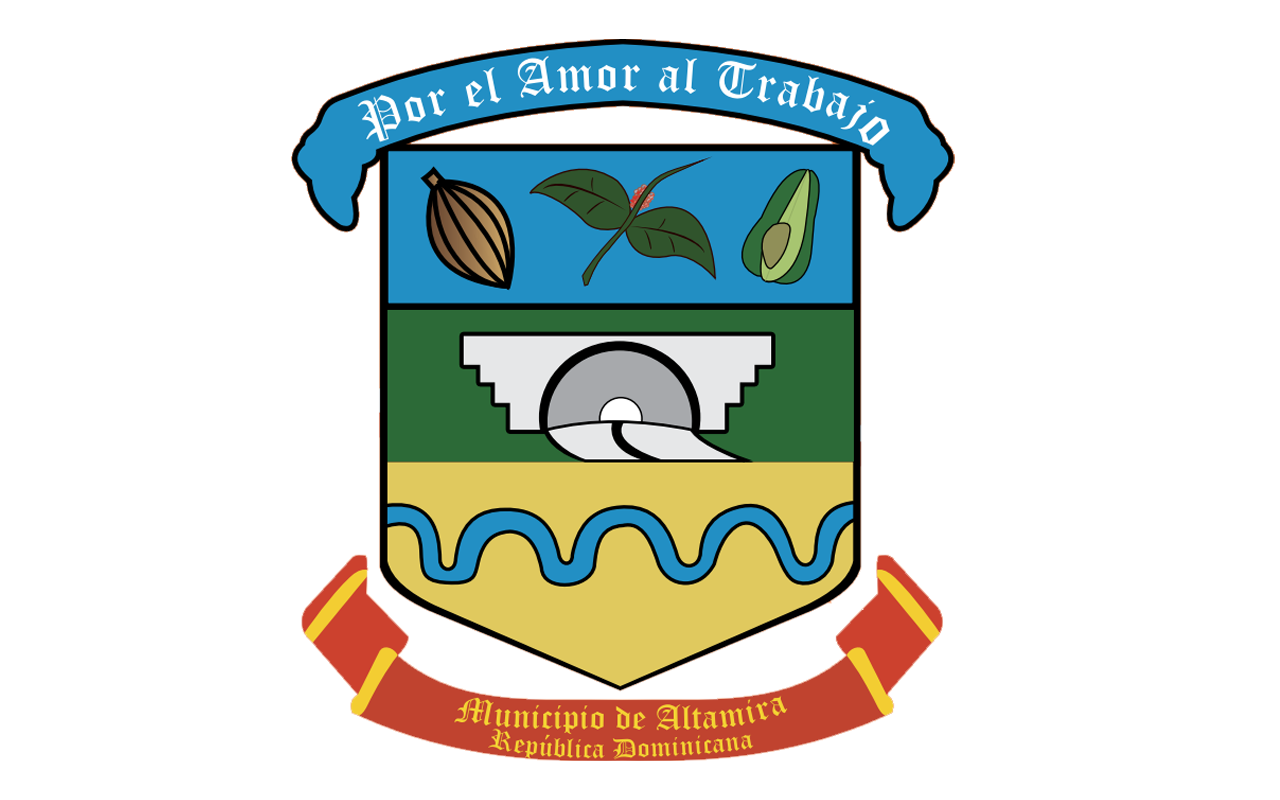
- Flag

- Altamira in the Dominican Republic Altamira (North America)
- Coordinates: 19°40′0″N 70°50′0″W
- Country: Dominican Republic
- Province: Puerto Plata

Area
  - Total: 179.32 km^{2} (69.24 sq mi)

Population (2012)
  - Total: 26,056
  - Density: 145.30/km^{2} (376.34/sq mi)
  - Urban: 7,889
- Municipal Districts: 1

Altamira is a town in the Puerto Plata Province of the Dominican Republic.

The town's name is the subject of at least two different origin traditions. One asserts that when Christopher Columbus first arrived in the area, he took note of the height of the mountains and exclaimed: "Look at the heights." Another reports that the name is based on the geographical resemblance of the region to Spain's Altamira Caves.

On October 29, 1889, President Ulises Heureaux declared the town a municipality. To this day, October 29 is celebrated in Altamira with municipal festivities.

== History ==
In its earliest days, Altamira functioned as a set of large agricultural ranches, populated by families transferred there from nearby conucos (small farms). For this reason, some still call Altamira's signature tobacco plantations the "Ranches of Puerto Plata."

At the time of the Devastations of Ozoria, the community helped maintain communication between the Valley of the Cibao and Puerto Plata. It also served as a refuge and hideout for settlers who refused to abandon the region.

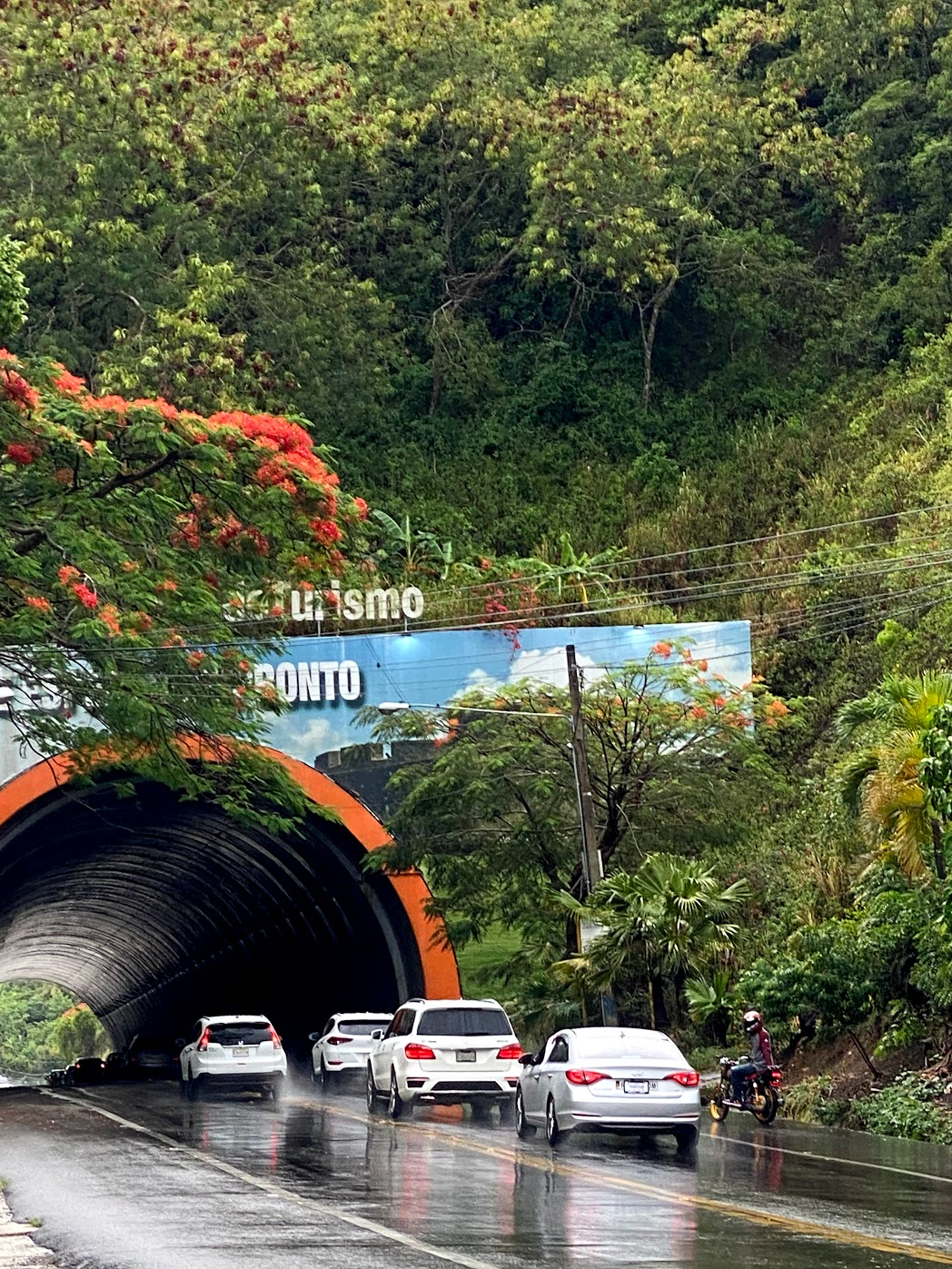
Tunnel in Altamira, Dominican Republic connecting the province of Puerto Plata to Santiago.

During the period of the Annexation, Altamira became a part of the Province of Santiago by Law No. 40 of 1845. After the War of Restoration brought national independence, Altamira's importance grew, as not just an area of strategic military importance, but also as a demographic and commercial center.

In the times of the Restoration, Altamira's initially dispersed shacks became more numerous. They were grouped in the shape of a village that held 60 to 75 families. The villagers cultivated short-cycle agricultural products and the bred of untamed stock. During the War of Restoration, commercial activities diminished, but shortly afterward they again flourished. At the time Altamira had a single street, the "Street of the Commerce," whose main businesses were clothing, shoes, groceries and household goods.

When Altamira was declared a municipality, its first communal leader was General Don José Hilario Francisco. His ally, Manuel "Manuelita" Peña served as chief of police. The town's first Catholic priest was Juan Albino. All three were sworn in by Puerto Plata's Provincial Governor, Pedro Pepín.

The street now known as San José was initially a road built in 1890 and called at the time the "Street of the Donkeys," because donkeys were the main draft animal of the time and were nearly ubiquitous there.

A railroad connection between Puerto Plata and Santiago opened in 1897. Its main station was located in Altamira's La Piedra section. According to local tradition, travel time between the two terminals was two-and-a-half hours.

== Geography ==
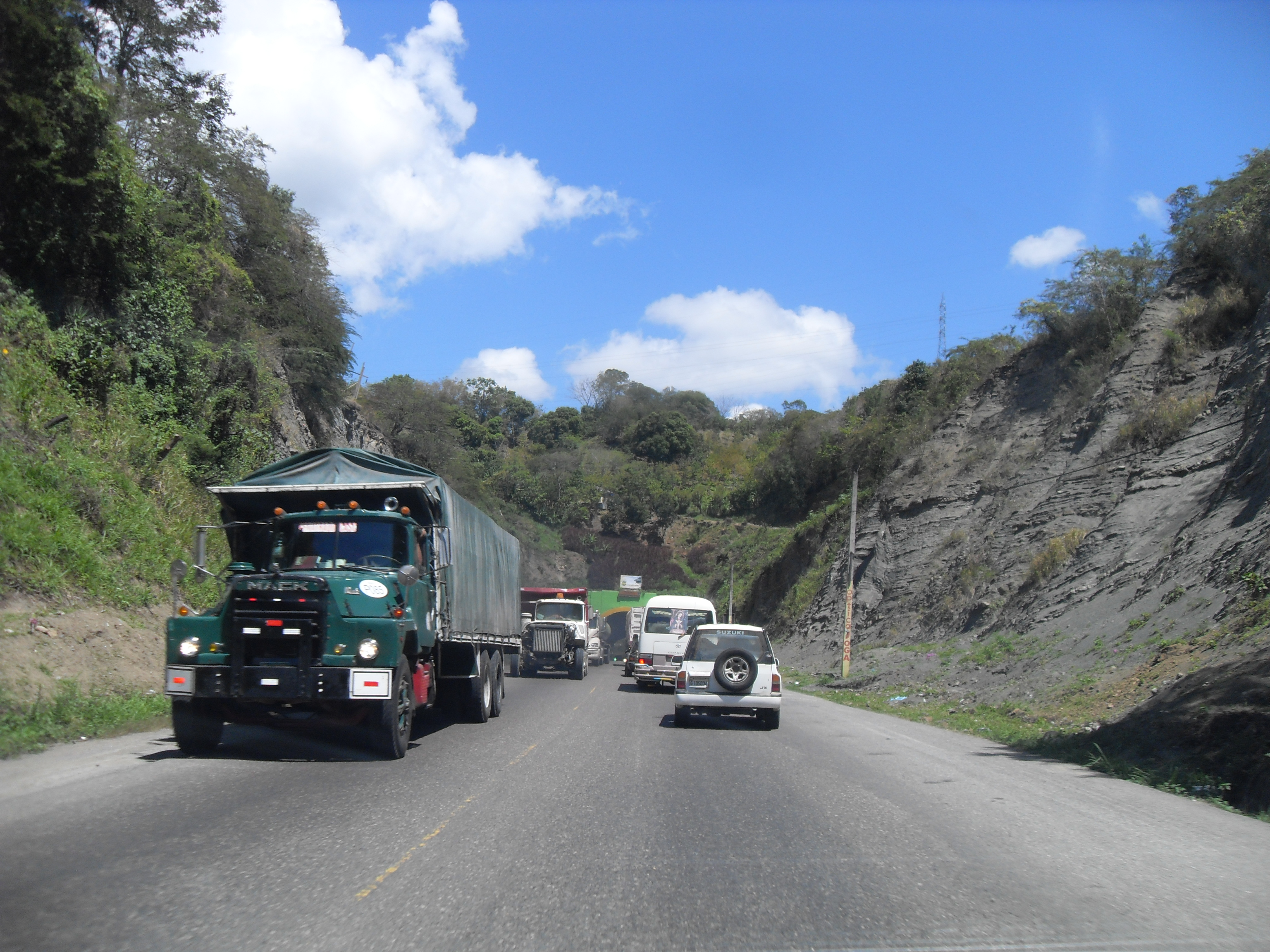
Driving road towards tunnel of Altamira, Puerto Plata.

Altamira is situated in the Cordillera Septentrional, 400 meters above sea level. It has a humid forest climate.

It is located at a latitude between 19.6 and 19.7 N and a longitude between 70.7 and 70.8 W. It is bounded on the north by the municipality of Imbert, on the south by Santiago Province, on the west by the municipalities of Guananico and Esperanza and on the east by the municipality San Felipe.

It has an approximate land area of 188,08 km. It is the Dominican Republic's fifth largest municipality in area and is divided into eight regions: Río Grande, Pescado Bobo, El Mamey, Palmar Grande, Los Llanos, Higüero, Quebrada Honda y Escalera.

=== Climate ===
Climate data for Altamira, Puerto Plata (1961–1990)
Month	Jan	Feb	Mar	Apr	May	Jun	Jul	Aug	Sep	Oct	Nov	Dec	Year
Record high °C (°F)	32.5 (90.5)	33.5 (92.3)	37.2 (99.0)	36.5 (97.7)	36.0 (96.8)	36.0 (96.8)	36.0 (96.8)	36.0 (96.8)	36.3 (97.3)	36.0 (96.8)	37.5 (99.5)	32.7 (90.9)	37.5 (99.5)
Mean daily maximum °C (°F)	27.2 (81.0)	27.9 (82.2)	29.0 (84.2)	29.6 (85.3)	30.8 (87.4)	32.2 (90.0)	32.1 (89.8)	32.3 (90.1)	32.2 (90.0)	31.5 (88.7)	29.3 (84.7)	27.5 (81.5)	30.1 (86.2)
Mean daily minimum °C (°F)	17.1 (62.8)	17.3 (63.1)	17.8 (64.0)	18.6 (65.5)	19.9 (67.8)	20.7 (69.3)	20.6 (69.1)	20.8 (69.4)	20.7 (69.3)	20.3 (68.5)	18.8 (65.8)	17.6 (63.7)	19.2 (66.6)
Record low °C (°F)	12.5 (54.5)	11.5 (52.7)	12.0 (53.6)	11.0 (51.8)	13.4 (56.1)	15.2 (59.4)	17.2 (63.0)	17.0 (62.6)	17.4 (63.3)	16.0 (60.8)	14.0 (57.2)	13.0 (55.4)	11.0 (51.8)
Average rainfall mm (inches)	136.0 (5.35)	106.2 (4.18)	108.8 (4.28)	166.1 (6.54)	207.1 (8.15)	117.7 (4.63)	67.6 (2.66)	82.4 (3.24)	140.6 (5.54)	199.3 (7.85)	270.6 (10.65)	198.1 (7.80)	1,800.5 (70.89)
Average rainy days (≥ 0.1 mm)	7.6	6.0	6.3	8.1	10.2	7.1	6.8	6.3	8.3	10.9	11.3	9.4	98.3
Source: NOAA

== Culture ==
=== Rich culture ===
- Grupo Cultural Ugaca
- Palos y Atabales
- Velas Ofrecidas
- Canto Folklórico La Pepa
- Canto y Baile Folklórico El Machacó
- Fiestas Patronales
- Anniversario de Altamira
- Viacrusis de la Iglesia
- Club Hijos Y Amigos de Altamira N.Y.

=== Important zones ===
- Los Picos de Río Grande; Pilar y Angostura.
- El Pico Diego De Ocampo
- Loma de los Puntieles (Los Lirios y Guazaral)
- Alto de Bohío.
- Loma de la Prieta
- La Lomota
- Los Manantiales
- Loma el Gallo.
- Loma de Quinigua.

=== Recommended sites ===
- Balneario Natural Las Angostura (Río Grande Abajo)
- Balneario Montaña Verde (Quebrada Honda)
- Saltadero la Damajagua (Palmar Grande).
- Balneario Boca de Río Grande.(Palmar Grande)
- Charco la Piedra (Palmar Grande)
- Balneario Cuevas de las Aguas (Escalera)
- Balneario El Almacén (Río Grande)
- Balneario Charco de la Paila (El Almacén)
- Balneario Bellaco (Bajabonico Arriba).
- Balneario Agua Fresca (Quebrada Honda)
- Balneario La Bajaita (El Puente la Jagua)
- Balneario el charco de pilar (Rio grande abajo)

== Notable people ==
- Bartolo Colón, (b 1973), is a Dominican professional baseball player winner of the 2005 AL Cy Young Award Colon holds the record for most career wins by a Latin American-born pitcher at 247 wins.
- Donaciano Chanito Vargas, mayor of Altamira (1966 - 1968)
- Wilfrido Vargas, (b 1949), is a band leader, trumpeter, vocalist, arranger, composer and producer.
- Alberto Ulloa, (b 1950 – 2011), Dominican painter, sculptor and poet.

== Sources ==
- https://web.archive.org/web/20080925094521/http://www.wikidominicana.edu.do/wiki/Municipio_Altamira
