= La Jaiba =

La Jaiba may refer to:

- La Jaiba, Cuba, a reparto and barrio in the municipality of Matanzas
- La Jaiba, Dominican Republic, a small town in the Puerto Plata province
