= Belloso =

Belloso is a surname. Notable people with the surname include:

- Ariel Belloso (born 1967), Argentine DJ and record producer also known as Ariel
- Carlos Belloso (born 1963), Argentine actor
- Gonzalo Belloso (born 1974), Argentine footballer
- José Alfonso Belloso y Sánchez (1873–1938), Salvadoran bishop
- Olga Martín-Belloso (born 1960), Spanish scientist
- Ramón Belloso (1810–1858), Salvadoran military man

== See also ==
- Los Bellosos
- Universidad Rafael Belloso Chacín
