= Puerto Plata Province =

Province of the Dominican Republic

Puerto Plata
- Province
- Flag Coat of arms
- Mottoes: La Tacita de Plata; La novia del Atlantico
- Location of the Puerto Plata Province
- Coordinates: 19°44′12″N 70°46′12″W
- Country: Dominican Republic
- Region: Cibao
- Province since: 1850
- Capital: San Felipe de Puerto Plata

Government
  - Type: Subdivisions
  - Body: 9 municipalities 12 municipal districts
  - Congresspersons: 1 Senator; 6 Deputies

Area
  - Total: 1,852.90 km^{2} (715.41 sq mi)

Population (2014)
  - Total: 470,839
  - Density: 254.109/km^{2} (658.140/sq mi)
- Time zone: UTC-4 (AST)
- Area code: 1-809 1-829 1-849
- ISO 3166-2: DO-18
- Postal Code: 57000

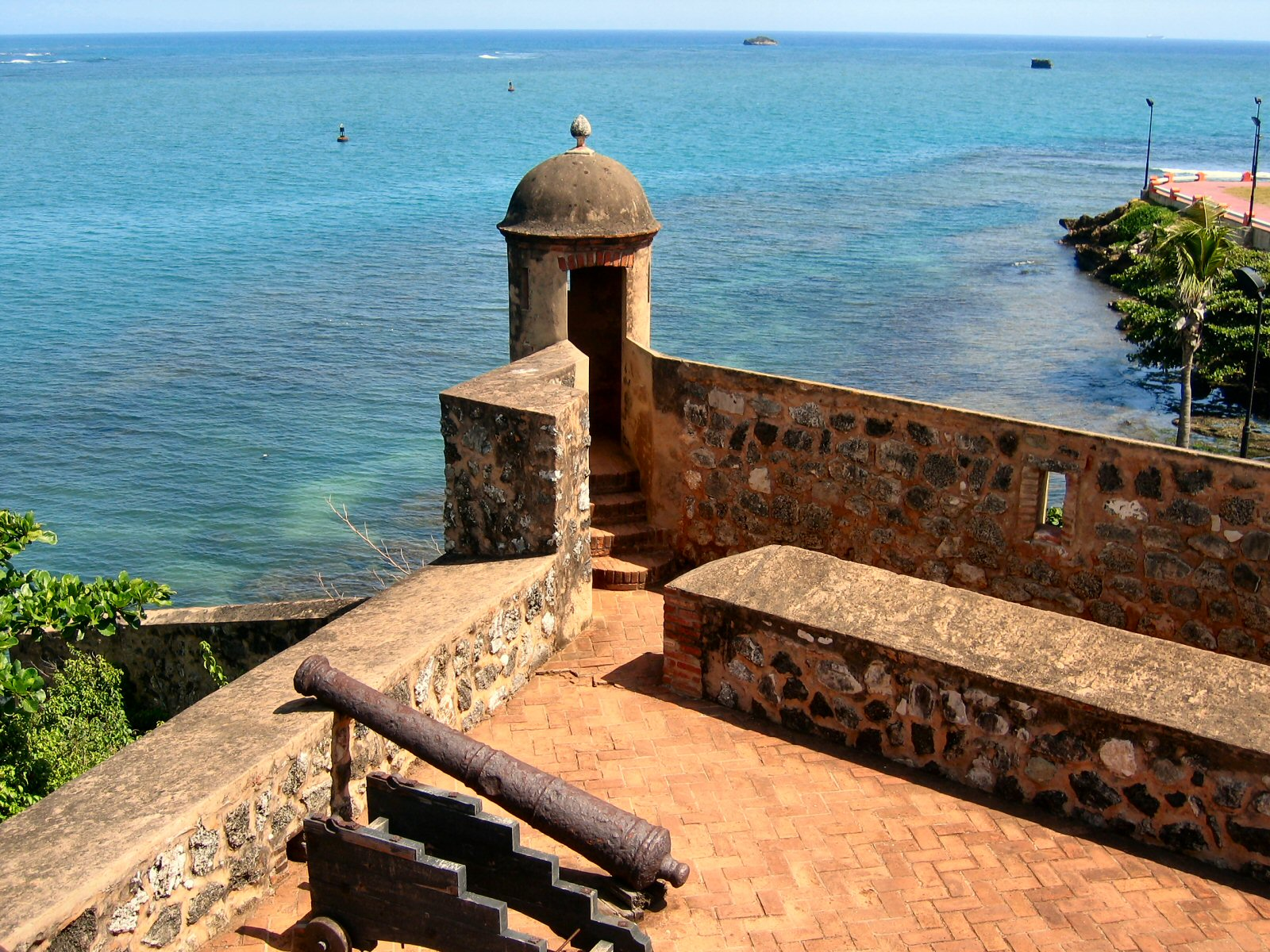
Puerto Plata

Puerto Plata (Spanish pronunciation: [pweɾtoˈplata], Silver Port); (French: Port-de-Plate) is a province in northern Dominican Republic. It is divided into 9 municipalities, 12 municipal districts and its capital is the resort city of the same name. Neighboring provinces clockwise: Monte Cristi to the southwest, Valverde and Santiago to the south and Espailat to the east, along with the Septentrional mountain range to the north (which separates it from Laguna Salada), and has a coastline with the Atlantic Ocean. The area has become an increasingly popular tourist attraction since the late 1990s mainly due to its fine beaches.

Created from the Santiago Province in 1867 as a "maritime district", it became a province in 1907, when maritime districts were suppressed by a new Dominican constitution.

== History ==
In 1493, La Isabela was founded by Christopher Columbus, being the first European town in the Americas. For its part, Puerto Plata was founded by Nicolás de Ovando at the beginning of the Hispanic colonization, around 1502. One of the first inhabitants in the years 1509 of the "Villa de Puerto de Plata" was Gaspar Briceño, a native of Arévalo del Reino from Castilla y León, who arrived on the island as a servant of Juan de Berlanga, treasurer of the Mayor's Office of the city of Santo Domingo, on the island of Hispaniola. He held the position of "field bailiff" of the Villa de Santiago that belonged to the Villa de Concepción de la Vega and this corresponded to the Mayor's Office of the City of Santo Domingo. His name appears in the "Colón-Solís" trial, where the encomendero of the Villa de Santiago, Francisco de Solís, murdered two naborías Indians. The field bailiff was in charge of capturing the Indians or blacks who escaped from the parcels. It was one of the cities devastated in 1606 and was not repopulated until after 1736. The advent of republican times favored the development of the city, which over time became the main port of Cibao, especially for exporting the regional tobacco.

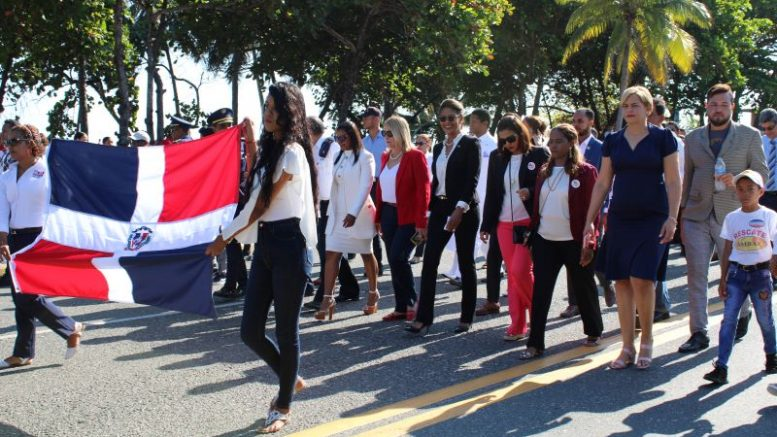
Parade of Puerto Plata city, Dominican Republic

By Resolution of the National Congress dated July 6, 1847, Puerto Plata was elevated from common to Maritime District. It became a province in the year 1850. In 1879, it was the seat of the government of President Gregorio Luperón and served as the internal capital of the Republic.

== Municipalities and municipal districts ==
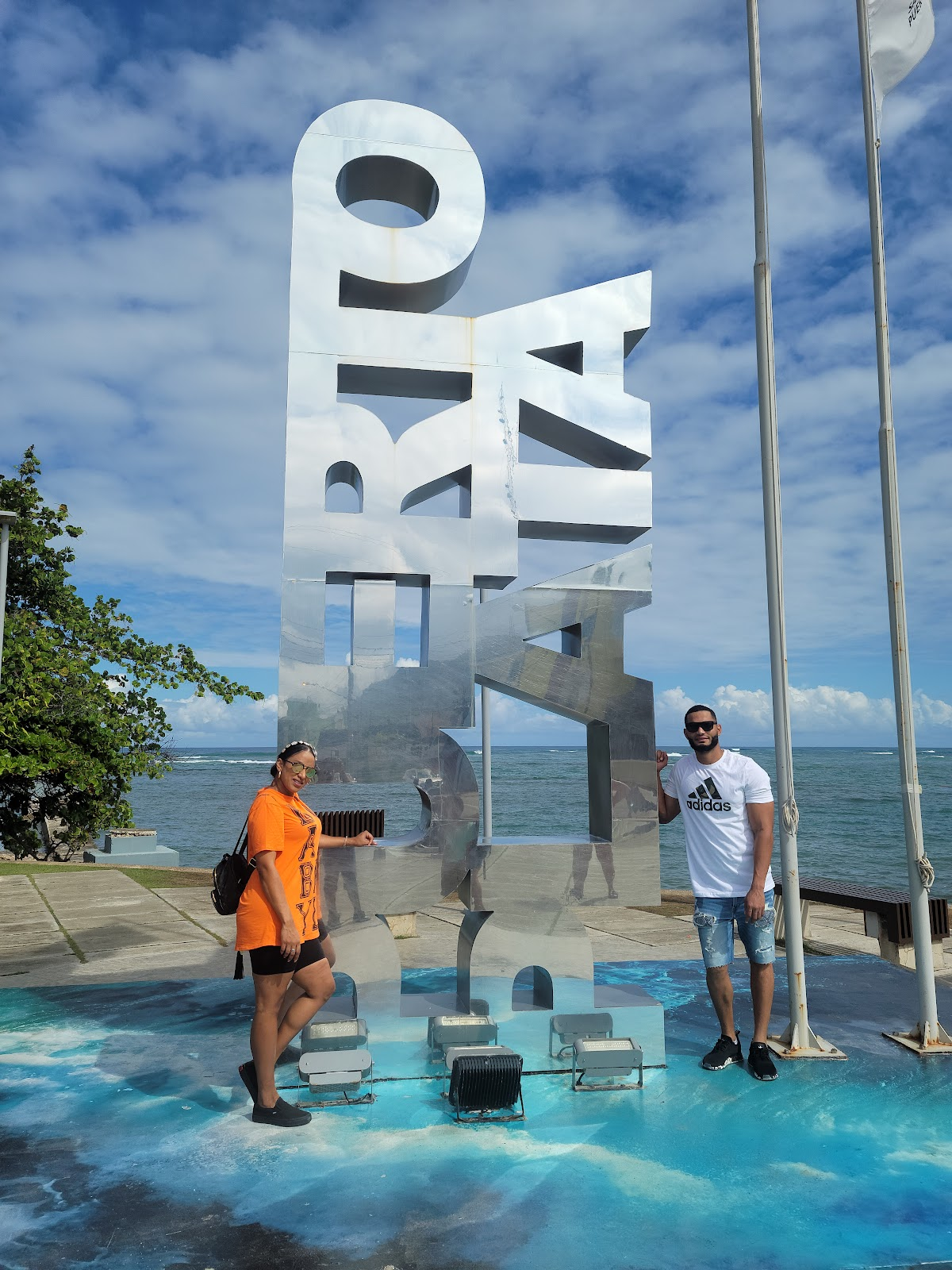
Puerto Plata, Dominican Republic

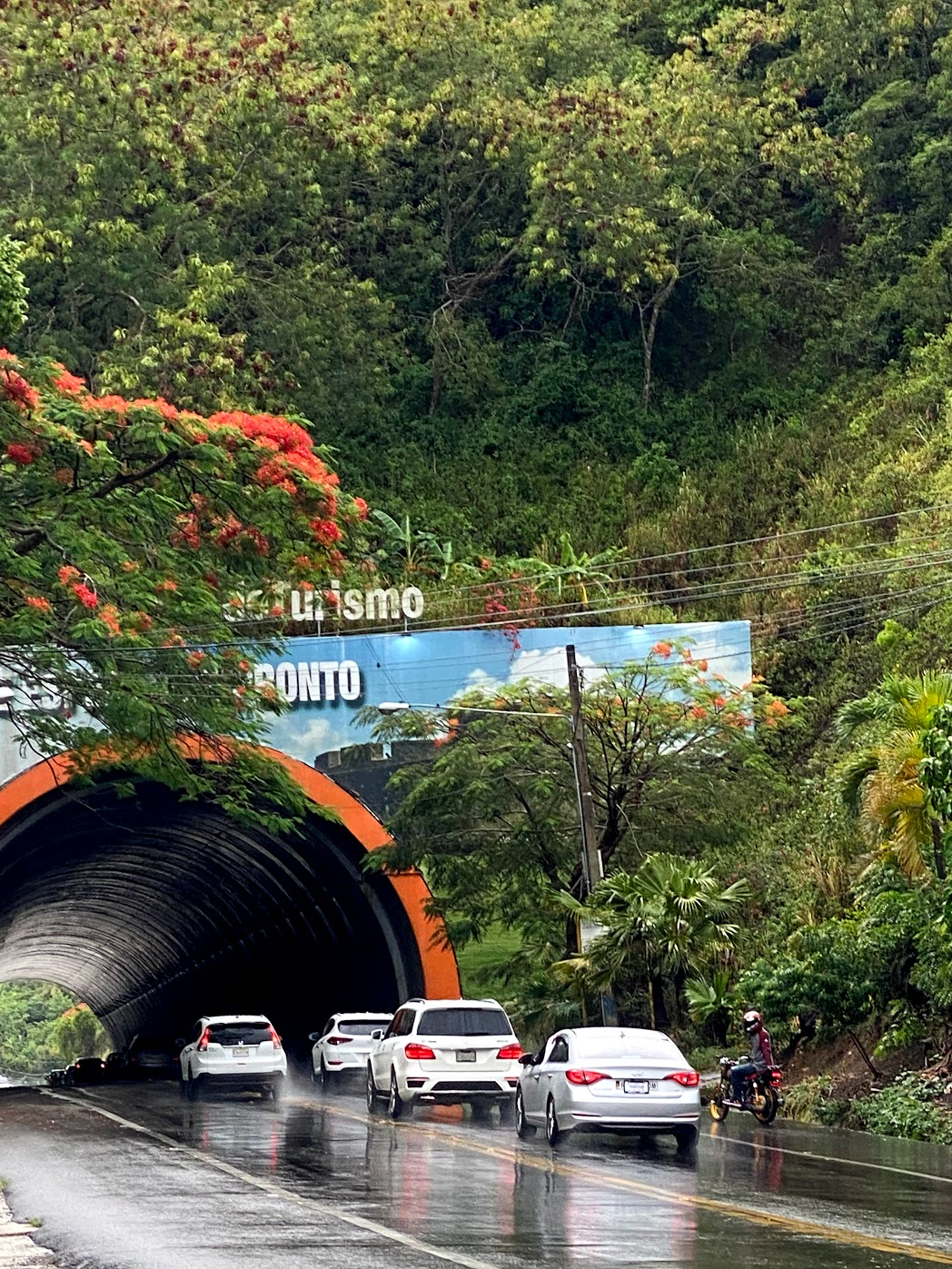
Tunnel in Altamira, Dominican Republic connecting the province of Puerto Plata to Santiago

The province is divided into the following municipalities (municipios) and municipal districts (distrito municipal – D.M.) within them:

- San Felipe
  - Maimón (D.M.)
  - Yásica Arriba (D.M.)
- Altamira
  - Río Grande (D.M.)
- Guananico
- Imbert
- Los Hidalgos
  - Cerro de Navas (D.M.)
- Luperón
  - Los Bellosos (D.M.)
  - La Isabela (D.M.)
  - Los Conucos (D.M.)
- Sosúa
  - Cabarete (D.M.)
  - Sabaneta de Yásica (D.M.)
- Villa Isabela
  - Estero Hondo (D.M.)
  - La Jaiba, Dominican Republic (D.M.)
  - Gualete (D.M.)
- Villa Montellano

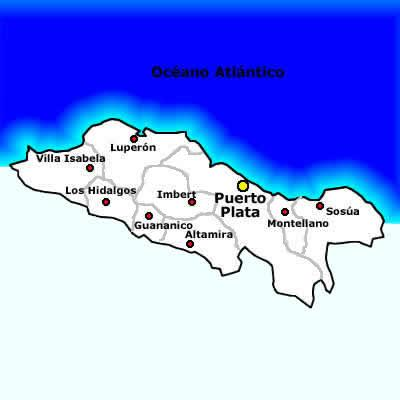
Municipalities of Puerto Plata Province

The following is a sortable table of the municipalities with population figures as of the 2012 census (the last national census). Urban population are those living in the seats (cabeceras literally heads) of municipalities or of municipal districts. Rural population are those living in the districts (Secciones literally sections) and neighborhoods (Parajes literally places) outside of them.

Name	Total population	Urban population	Rural population
Altamira	26,056	7,889	18,167
Guananico	8,954	3,025	5,929
Imbert	30,514	14,589	15,925
Los Hidalgos	14,589	3,022	11,567
Luperón	20,259	4,989	15,270
San Felipe	286,558	247,569	38,989
Sosúa	69,885	19,338	50,547
Villa Isabela	14,889	1,058	13,831
Villa Montellano	19,029	9,009	10,020
Puerto Plata province	490,733	310,488	180,245

For comparison with the municipalities and municipal districts of other provinces see the list of municipalities and municipal districts of the Dominican Republic.

== Notable people ==
- Arthur Lithgow (1915-2004), Dominican-American actor and director
- Huascar Ynoa (b. 1998), Dominican professional baseball pitcher for the Atlanta Braves

== See also ==
- Gregorio Luperón International Airport
