= Yásica Arriba =

Yasica Arriba
- Location within the Dominican Republic
- Coordinates: 19°38′N 70°36′W
- Country: Dominican Republic
- Province: Puerto Plata

Population (2008)
  - Total: 23,114
- Area codes: 809, 829

Yasica Arriba is a town in the province of Puerto Plata in the Dominican Republic.

== Climate ==
Climate data for Yásica Arriba (1961–1990)
Month	Jan	Feb	Mar	Apr	May	Jun	Jul	Aug	Sep	Oct	Nov	Dec	Year
Record high °C (°F)	34.9 (94.8)	35.0 (95.0)	41.0 (105.8)	36.1 (97.0)	36.0 (96.8)	36.6 (97.9)	37.6 (99.7)	37.1 (98.8)	42.0 (107.6)	40.0 (104.0)	36.0 (96.8)	35.5 (95.9)	42.0 (107.6)
Mean daily maximum °C (°F)	28.3 (82.9)	28.4 (83.1)	29.4 (84.9)	30.0 (86.0)	30.7 (87.3)	32.1 (89.8)	32.0 (89.6)	32.1 (89.8)	32.3 (90.1)	31.6 (88.9)	29.6 (85.3)	28.3 (82.9)	30.4 (86.7)
Daily mean °C (°F)	23.3 (73.9)	23.2 (73.8)	23.7 (74.7)	24.3 (75.7)	25.2 (77.4)	26.2 (79.2)	26.3 (79.3)	26.4 (79.5)	26.5 (79.7)	26.1 (79.0)	24.8 (76.6)	23.8 (74.8)	25.0 (77.0)
Mean daily minimum °C (°F)	18.4 (65.1)	18.1 (64.6)	18.0 (64.4)	18.6 (65.5)	19.7 (67.5)	20.4 (68.7)	20.7 (69.3)	20.8 (69.4)	20.8 (69.4)	20.6 (69.1)	20.0 (68.0)	19.4 (66.9)	19.6 (67.3)
Record low °C (°F)	13.3 (55.9)	13.3 (55.9)	11.2 (52.2)	14.1 (57.4)	14.7 (58.5)	15.8 (60.4)	13.4 (56.1)	17.0 (62.6)	16.0 (60.8)	13.9 (57.0)	13.4 (56.1)	11.0 (51.8)	11.0 (51.8)
Average rainfall mm (inches)	148.6 (5.85)	120.2 (4.73)	131.6 (5.18)	203.7 (8.02)	222.6 (8.76)	95.0 (3.74)	98.9 (3.89)	121.8 (4.80)	113.5 (4.47)	176.6 (6.95)	283.6 (11.17)	267.2 (10.52)	1,983.3 (78.08)
Average rainy days (≥ 1.0 mm)	11.7	8.8	8.3	10.0	12.3	7.5	8.6	10.1	9.2	11.9	14.5	14.4	127.3
Source: NOAA

== Sources ==
- http://nona.net/features/map/placedetail.1530656/Los%20Bellosos/
- – World-Gazetteer.com
