= Gualete =

- Location within the Dominican Republic
- Coordinates: 19°46′0″N 71°6′0″W
- Country: Dominican Republic
- Province: Puerto Plata

Population (2008)
  - Total: 2,041
- Area codes: 809, 829

Gualete is a town in the Puerto Plata province of the Dominican Republic.
