= Los Hidalgos =

Town in Puerto Plata, Dominican Republic

- Los Hidalgos in the Dominican Republic
- Coordinates: 19°43′48″N 71°1′48″W
- Country: Dominican Republic
- Province: Puerto Plata
- Established as a Municipality: December 8, 1978

Area
  - Total: 101.10 km^{2} (39.03 sq mi)

Population (2012)
  - Total: 14,589
  - Density: 144.30/km^{2} (373.74/sq mi)
  - Urban: 2,671
- Municipal Districts: 1
- Climate: Aw

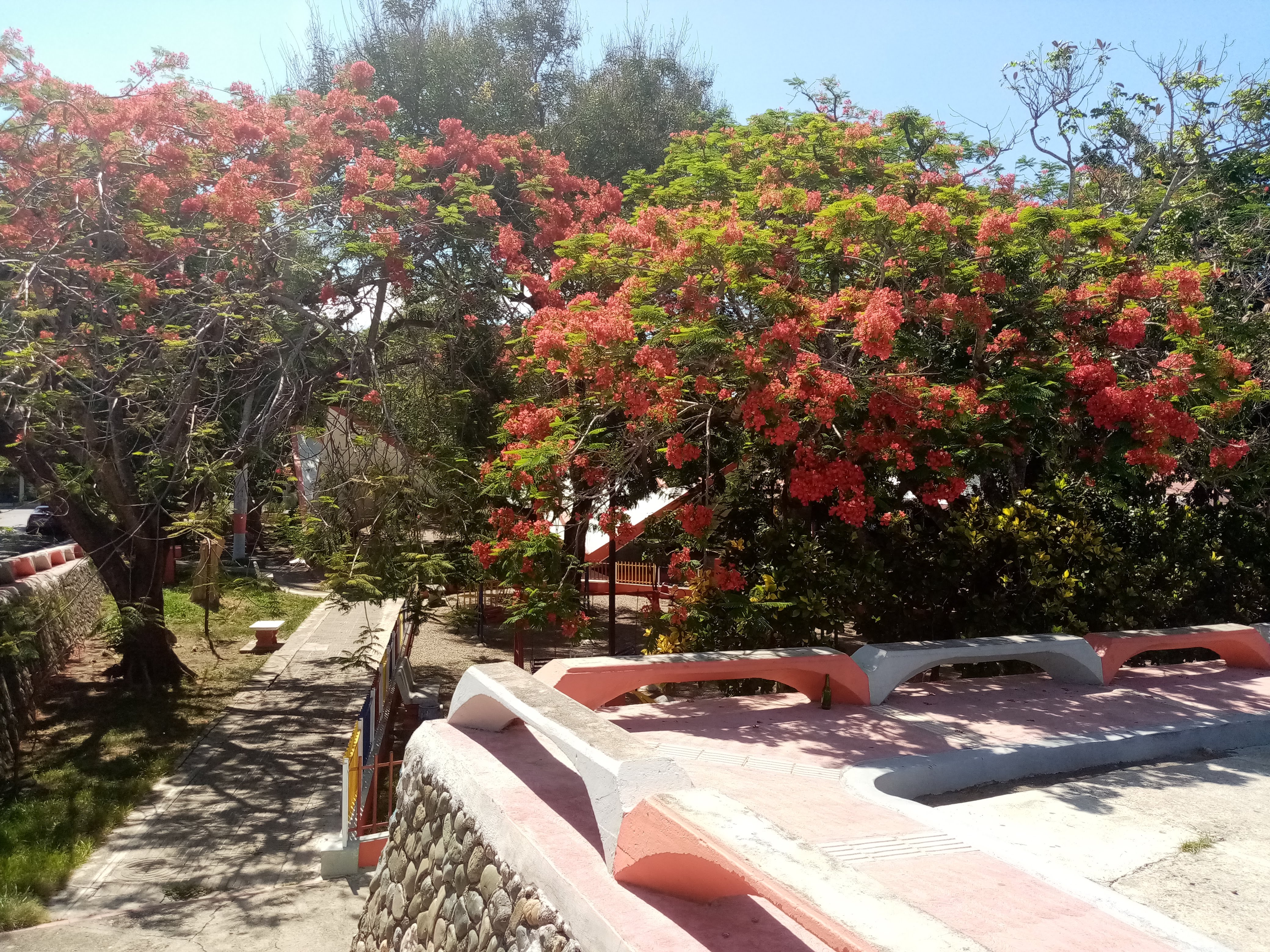

Los Hidalgos is a small town in the Dominican Republic which straddles the border between the Puerto Plata Province and Valverde Province. The northern part is called El Mamey and the southern part Altos de los Acosta.The nearest major town is Santiago de los Caballeros, about 60 km (37 mi) east.

== Sources ==
- – World-Gazetteer.com
