= Villa Isabela =

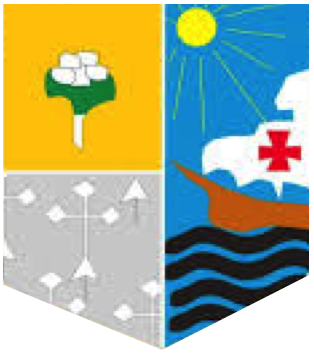
- Coat of arms

- Villa Isabela in the Dominican Republic
- Coordinates: 19°49′12″N 71°3′0″W
- Country: Dominican Republic
- Province: Puerto Plata

Area
  - Total: 212.60 km^{2} (82.09 sq mi)

Population (2012)
  - Total: 14,889
  - Density: 70.033/km^{2} (181.38/sq mi)
- Municipal Districts: 3

Villa Isabela is a town in the Puerto Plata province of the Dominican Republic. It lies 9 km south of the site of La Isabela, where Christopher Columbus founded a settlement in 1493.

The archeological site of this town was added to the UNESCO World Heritage Tentative List on February 5, 2018 in the Cultural category.

== Sources ==
- – World-Gazetteer.com
