= Río Grande, Dominican Republic =

Río Grande
- Location within the Dominican Republic
- Coordinates: 19°43′48″N 70°48′00″W
- Country: Dominican Republic
- Province: Puerto Plata

Population (2008)
  - Total: 20,154
- Area codes: 809, 829
- Website: http://www.mialtamira.com

Río Grande is a town in the Puerto Plata province of the Dominican Republic.

== Sources ==
- https://web.archive.org/web/20081014155151/http://www.mialtamira.com/
- http://nona.net/features/map/placedetail.1526091/Boca%20de%20R%C3%ADo%20Grande/
- – World-Gazetteer.com
