= Cerro de Navas =

- Location within the Dominican Republic
- Coordinates: 19°49′0″N 70°59′0″W
- Country: Dominican Republic
- Province: Puerto Plata

Population (2008)
  - Total: 8,487
- Area codes: 809, 829

Cerro de Navas is a town in the Puerto Plata province of the Dominican Republic.

== Sources ==
- World Gazeteer: Dominican Republic – World-Gazetteer.com
