= Bartolo Colón =

Dominican baseball player (born 1973)

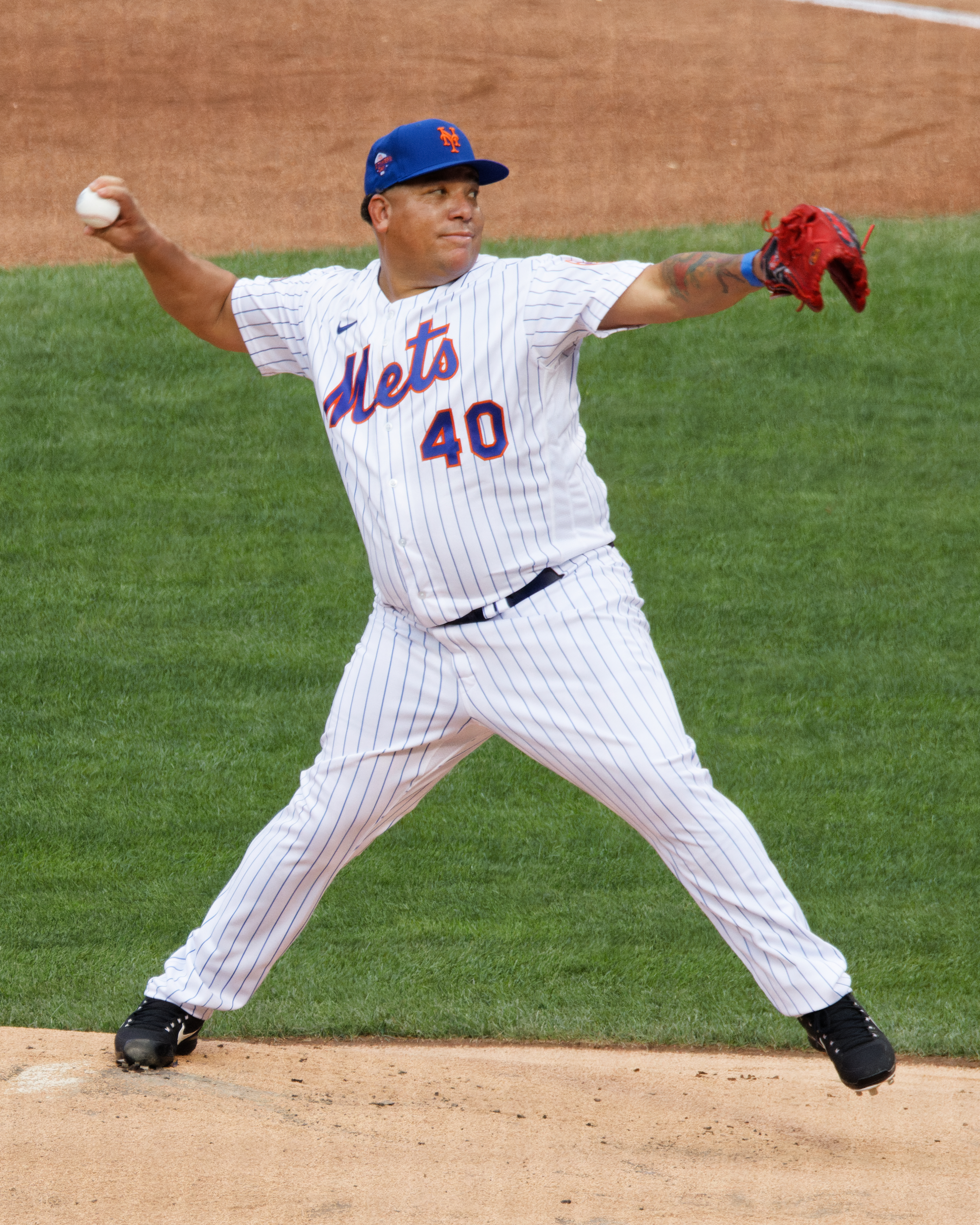
- Colón pitching in the 2022 New York Mets Old-Timers' Game
- Pitcher
- Born: May 24, 1973 (age 53); Altamira, Dominican Republic
- Batted: Right Threw: Right

MLB debut
- April 4, 1997, for the Cleveland Indians

Last MLB appearance
- September 22, 2018, for the Texas Rangers

MLB statistics
- Win–loss record: 247–188
- Earned run average: 4.12
- Strikeouts: 2,535
- Stats at Baseball Reference

Teams
- Cleveland Indians (1997–2002); Montreal Expos (2002); Chicago White Sox (2003); Anaheim Angels / Los Angeles Angels of Anaheim (2004–2007); Boston Red Sox (2008); Chicago White Sox (2009); New York Yankees (2011); Oakland Athletics (2012–2013); New York Mets (2014–2016); Atlanta Braves (2017); Minnesota Twins (2017); Texas Rangers (2018)

Career highlights and awards
- 4× All-Star (1998, 2005, 2013, 2016); AL Cy Young Award (2005); AL wins leader (2005)

Bartolo Colón (born May 24, 1973), nicknamed "Big Sexy", is a Dominican–American former professional baseball pitcher. He previously played for 11 different Major League Baseball (MLB) teams: the Cleveland Indians (1997–2002), Montreal Expos (2002), Chicago White Sox (2003, 2009), Los Angeles Angels of Anaheim (2004–2007), Boston Red Sox (2008), New York Yankees (2011), Oakland Athletics (2012–2013), New York Mets (2014–2016), Atlanta Braves (2017), Minnesota Twins (2017), and Texas Rangers (2018). Colón also played for the Águilas Cibaeñas of the Dominican Professional Baseball League (Dominican Winter League) and the Acereros de Monclova of the Mexican League.

Colón was selected to four MLB All-Star Games, one each for the Indians (1998), Angels (2005), Athletics (2013), and Mets (2016). He won the American League Cy Young Award with the Angels in 2005, when he led the league in wins. With the Mets in 2016, he became the oldest player to hit his first career home run, at 42 years and 349 days old. At age 45 during the 2018 season, Colón was the oldest active major league player and the last to have played for the Montreal Expos. He holds the record for most career wins by a Latin American-born pitcher.

In his last major-league season (2018), Colón and Rangers teammate Adrián Beltré were the last active players to have played in the 1990s. In August 2022, Colón announced that he intended to retire after the 2022–23 Dominican winter season.

== Early life ==
Bartolo Colón was born on May 24, 1973, in the town of Altamira in the Dominican Republic, where he grew up. He worked long days alongside his father, Miguel, harvesting coffee beans and fruit from the age of 9 to 14. Colón credited his childhood job with the development of his strength. He frequently does major charity work for his old community. Colón's mother, Adriana, died in 2014 of breast cancer.

== Professional career ==
=== Minor leagues ===
Colón was signed by the Cleveland Indians as an amateur free agent in 1993 and began his career in their minor league system. In 1995, pitching for Kinston of the Single-A Carolina League, he finished second in wins with 13 and ERA with 1.96, and led the circuit with 152 strikeouts. He was named the league's Pitcher of the Year, despite shutting down on August 1 with a bruised elbow. He was named the Indians' 1995 Minor League Player of the Year (receiving the "Lou Boudreau Award"). He played Triple-A ball with the Buffalo Bisons in 1997 and on June 21 became the only player in team history to throw a no-hitter at Sahlen Field, then called North AmeriCare Park.

=== Cleveland Indians (1997–2002) ===
Colón made his major league debut against the Anaheim Angels on April 4, 1997, receiving a no decision. In his first MLB season, Colón went 4–7 with a 5.65 earned run average. He was left off the postseason roster as the Indians made it to the World Series, losing in seven games to the Florida Marlins. The following year, he set the modern-day but unofficial major league record for throwing the most pitches (20) in a single at bat on June 26, 1998 against Ricky Gutiérrez, who eventually struck out. That record was broken in 2018. Later that season, Colón won his only start of the 1998 American League Championship Series, pitching a four-hit, one-run complete game. In his 1999 season, Colón finished 18–5, pitching over 200 innings with 161 strikeouts and a 3.95 earned run average.

On September 18, 2000, Colón pitched a one-hitter against the New York Yankees. In both 2000 and 2001, Colón posted over 200 strikeouts, making him the first Indians pitcher since Gaylord Perry to record at least 200 strikeouts in back-to-back seasons.

=== Montreal Expos (2002) ===
On June 27, 2002, the Indians traded Colón and Tim Drew to the Montreal Expos in exchange for Lee Stevens, Brandon Phillips, Grady Sizemore, and Cliff Lee. Colón finished 2002 with a combined 20–8 record and a 2.93 earned run average, including 76 earned runs with 70 walks in 233 1/3 innings, three shutouts, and eight complete games. Ultimately, he was the last active player who had played for the Montreal Expos.

=== Chicago White Sox (2003) ===
Before the 2003 season, Colón was traded to the Chicago White Sox with minor leaguer Jorge Nunez for Orlando Hernández, Rocky Biddle, Jeff Liefer and cash.

=== Anaheim Angels / Los Angeles Angels of Anaheim (2004–2007) ===
A free agent after the previous season, he signed with the Anaheim Angels in 2004. Colón won 18 games with Anaheim in 2004. During the 2005 season, he went 21–8 with a 3.48 earned run average, and became the first Angels pitcher to win the Cy Young Award since Dean Chance in 1964. Due to a partially torn rotator cuff that he received in a playoff game against the Yankees in 2005, Colón spent much of the 2006 season on the injured list with soreness or inflammation in his right shoulder. In 10 starts, Colón went 1–5 with a 5.11 earned run average.

On April 21, 2007, his first start of the 2007 season following his return from the injured list, Colón pitched 7 innings, allowing one run on seven hits for his first win in 2007.

=== Boston Red Sox (2008) ===
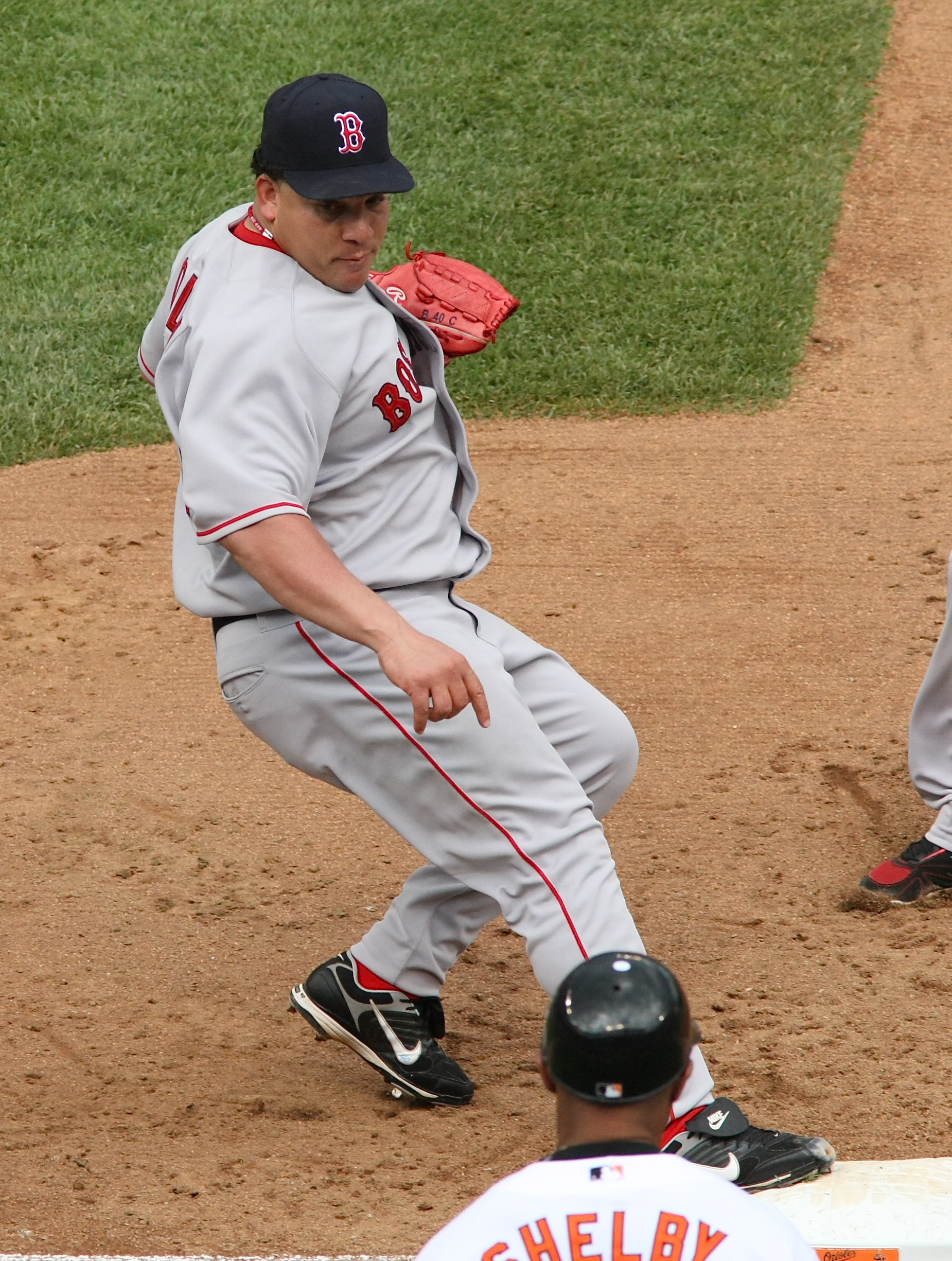
Colón with the Boston Red Sox in 2008

On February 25, 2008, Colón signed a minor league deal with the Boston Red Sox and was invited to spring training. On May 15, 2008, he threw a one-hitter for the Red Sox' Triple-A team, the Pawtucket Red Sox. Six days later, Colón's contract was purchased by the Red Sox, and he was added to the active roster. Colón pitched his first game for the Red Sox on May 21, 2008, against the Kansas City Royals. He earned his 150th career win on June 11, 2008, against the Baltimore Orioles.

On September 19, 2008, Colón was placed on the suspended list by the Red Sox after leaving for the Dominican Republic to handle "personal matters" and deciding to stay, effectively ending his Red Sox career. He was placed on the restricted list on September 25, 2008. Colón spent the postseason on the restricted list as the Red Sox won the 2008 ALDS against the Los Angeles Angels of Anaheim in 4 games, but lost the 2008 ALCS against the Tampa Bay Rays in 7 games. He filed for free agency after the end of the 2008 season.

=== Second stint with Chicago White Sox (2009) ===
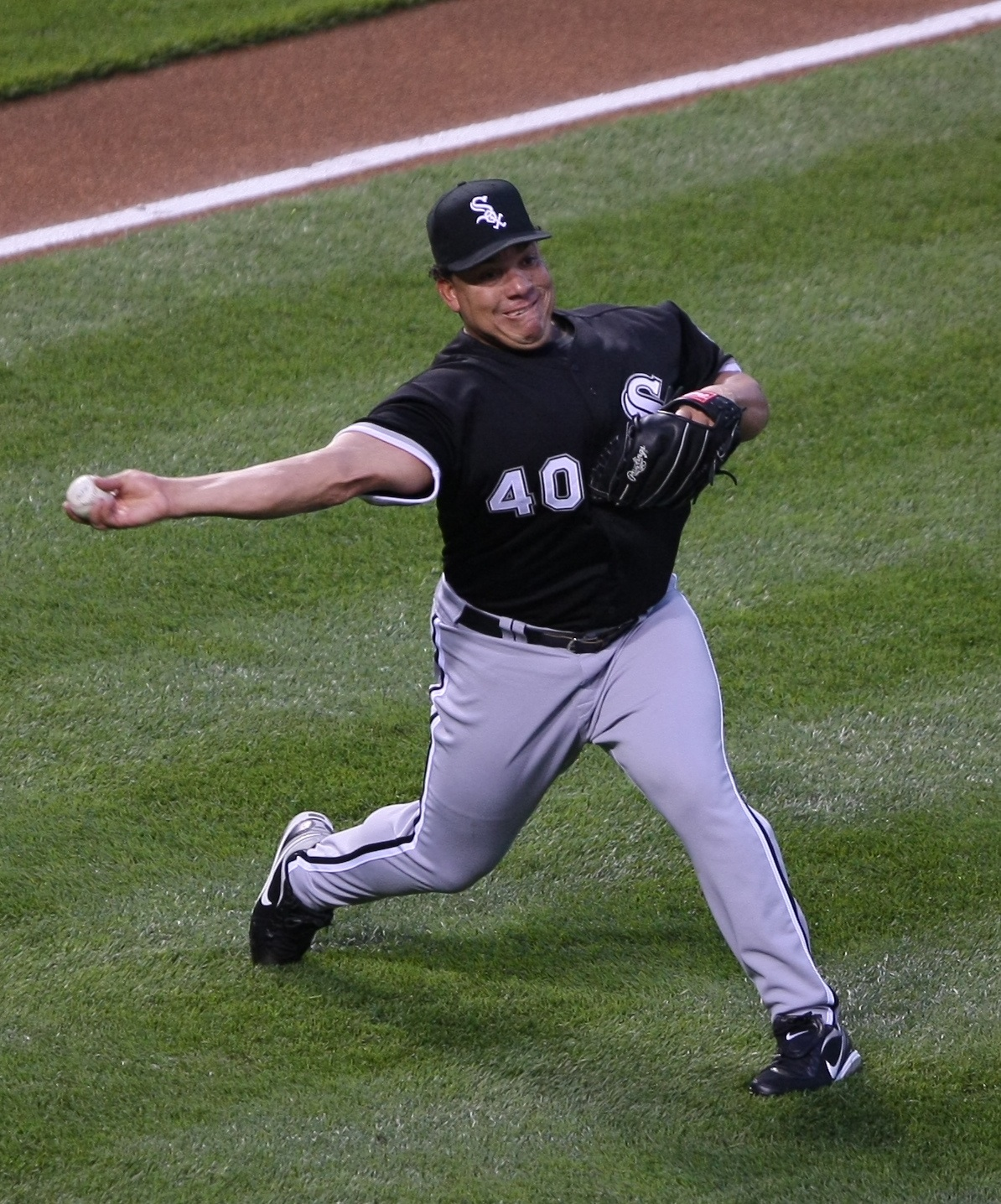
Colón with the Chicago White Sox in 2009

Colón agreed to a one-year, $1 million contract to return to the Chicago White Sox in January 2009, shortly after they traded Javier Vázquez to the Atlanta Braves. He competed for the fourth and fifth starters' positions in the White Sox rotation.

Colón made his comeback from off-season surgery to remove bone chips from his pitching arm elbow during the White Sox Spring training, in the Cactus League in Arizona. Manager Ozzie Guillén named him the White Sox' fifth starter before the start of the regular season. Colón won his first start in his second stint in Chicago, pitching six strong innings of three-hit ball as the Sox blanked Minnesota 8–0 on April 11, 2009. In doing so he became the first White Sox starting pitcher to win a regular season game in 2009. Colón then suffered another injury and did not pitch again for the remainder of the season. He was released on September 16.

=== New York Yankees (2011) ===
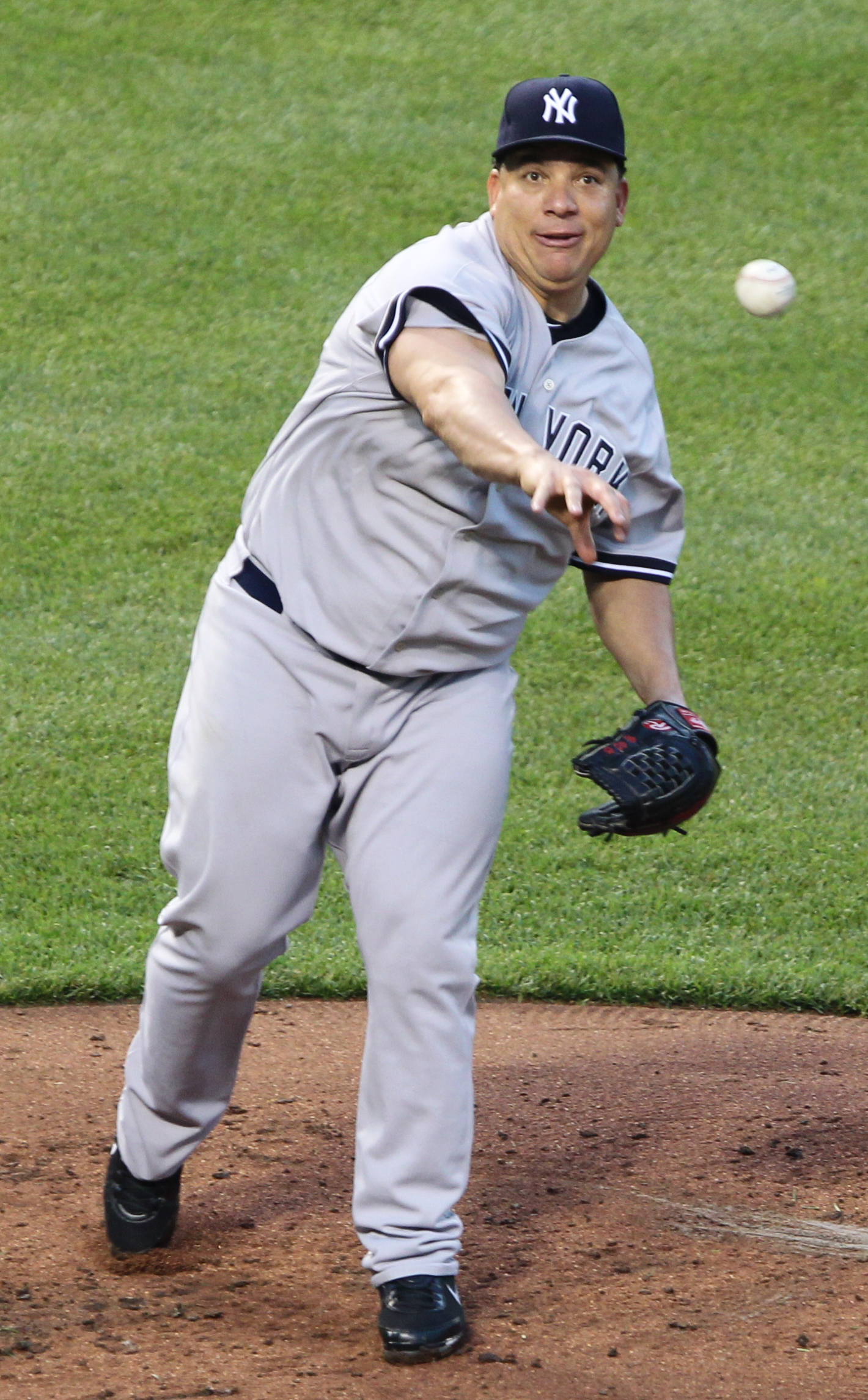
Colón with the New York Yankees in 2011

Colón did not pitch in 2010 due to ongoing right shoulder and elbow pain and damage to the rotator cuff, ligaments and tendons. In March 2010, he received a transplant of stem cells to repair the damaged tissues in his right shoulder. The orthopedic surgeon who performed the surgery said he had used human growth hormone in previous surgeries of the same type but not with Colón. The surgery was scrutinized by Major League Baseball but no wrongdoing was found.

Colón then played in the Pre-World Championship in Puerto Rico, winter ball with the Aguilas and the Leones del Escogido, and the Puerto Rican winter league, and announced that he would attempt a comeback to the major leagues for the 2011 season. He signed a minor-league deal with the New York Yankees on January 26, 2011. Colón was invited to spring training, competing for a spot on the 25-man roster, despite coming into camp 30 pounds overweight. He was named to the Yankees' Opening Day roster in the bullpen. Colón made his first start for the Yankees on April 20, taking the rotation spot of the injured Phil Hughes. Through May, Colon was 3–3 with a 3.26 earned run average. On May 30, 2011, he threw a four-hit shutout, his first since 2006 against the Athletics. He sustained a hamstring injury on June 11, 2011, against the Cleveland Indians. When he was injured, he was in the seventh inning of a shutout game, but he limped off the field after covering first base on a ground ball to Yankees first baseman Mark Teixeira. Colón then ended up on the 15-day injured list. He said that he would be back pitching right when eligible. On July 2, Colón returned to the Yankees and threw six shutout innings against the New York Mets. On July 14 against the Blue Jays, Colón exited after recording only two outs in the first inning while yielding eight runs, the shortest outing of his career. Colón's 2011 season was somewhat of a resurgence, going 8–10 with a 4.00 earned run average and a 1.29 walks plus hits divided by innings pitched ratio. He was demoted to the bullpen when the Yankees made the postseason and the team lost to the Detroit Tigers in the 2011 ALDS. He became a free agent following the end of the season.

=== Oakland Athletics (2012–2013) ===
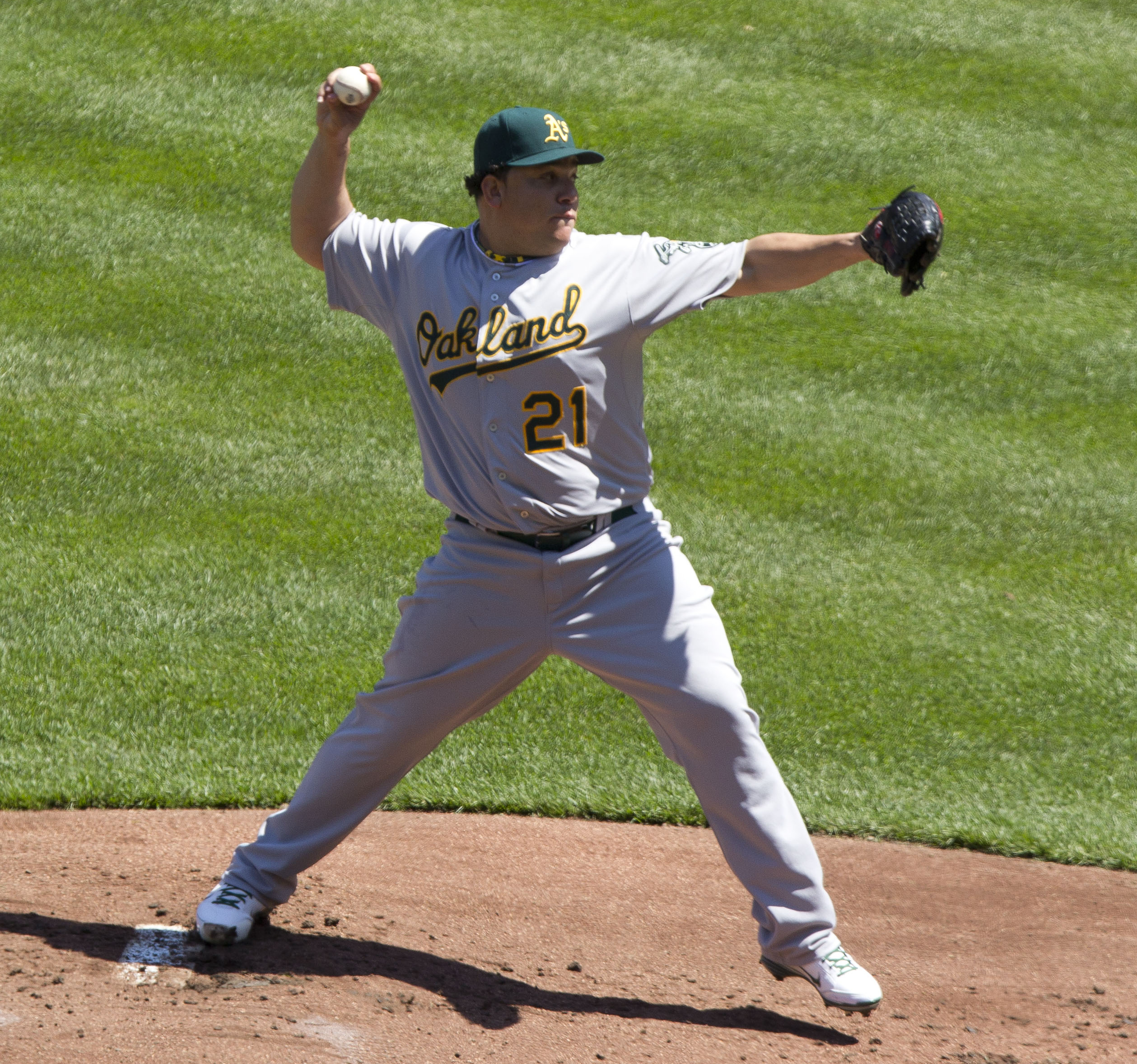
Colón pitching for the Oakland Athletics in 2012

On January 14, 2012, Colón agreed to a one-year, $2 million contract with the Oakland Athletics. He started the second game of the season for the Athletics in the Opening Series in Tokyo, Japan, throwing eight innings, giving up one run over three hits while recording six strikeouts. On April 18 Colón threw 38 consecutive strikes, the most since 1988, when MLB began to collect pitching data in-depth, in a start against the Los Angeles Angels of Anaheim. He started the 2012 season with a 3–1 record and 2.64 earned run average, but faltered with a 1–4 record and 5.80 earned run average in his next seven starts.

On August 22, 2012, MLB suspended Colón for 50 games after he tested positive for synthetic testosterone, a performance-enhancing substance in violation of the Joint Drug Prevention and Treatment Program. He was the second major leaguer to be suspended within a two-week time frame for testosterone (along with San Francisco Giants star Melky Cabrera).

The Athletics signed Colón to a one-year, $3 million deal for 2013. He was selected for his third All-Star team in July after posting an 11–3 record with a 2.78 earned run average.

=== New York Mets (2014–2016) ===
==== 2014 ====
On December 11, 2013, Colón agreed to a two-year, $20 million contract with the New York Mets. On June 18, he got his first hit in nine years when he hit a double off Lance Lynn. On August 8, 2014, Colón recorded his 200th win in a 5–4 victory over the Phillies. He is the third Dominican-born pitcher to do so, after Juan Marichal and Pedro Martínez, and the third pitcher to do so in a Mets uniform, after Orel Hershiser and Martínez. Colón finished the 2014 season with 31 starts, 15–13 record, 202 1/3 innings pitched, 151 strikeouts, and a 4.09 earned run average while giving up 218 hits, 30 walks, 22 home runs, and 97 runs (92 of them earned).

==== 2015 ====
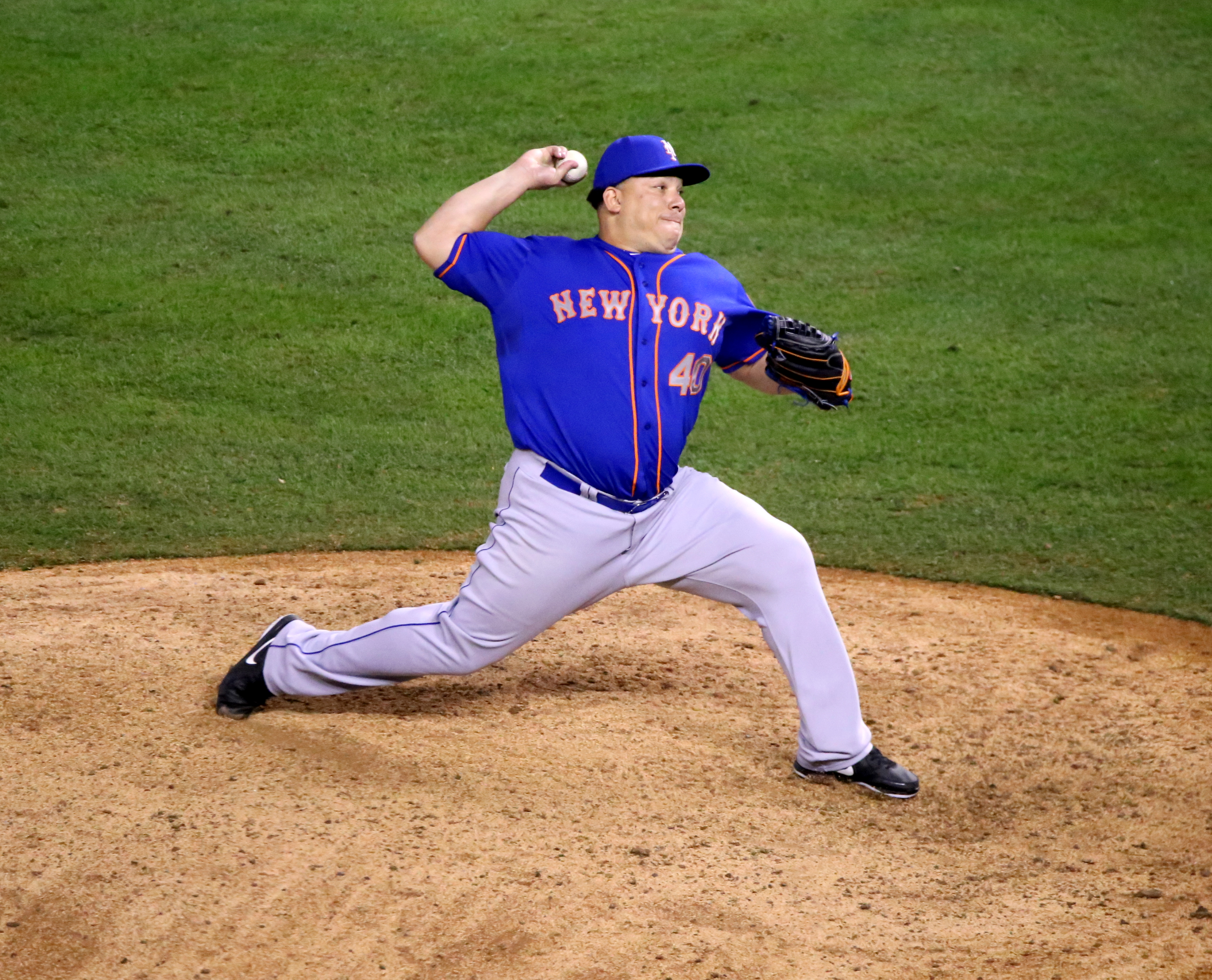
Colón delivers a pitch during Game 1 of the 2015 World Series

In 2015 against the Washington Nationals, Colón became the third opening day pitcher over 40 years old to strike out eight batters, after Cy Young and Nolan Ryan. On April 12, 2015, against the Atlanta Braves, Colón hit a run-scoring single off Alex Wood, the 6th run batted in of his career. On April 23, 2015, Colón completed an unassisted pickoff of Atlanta Braves catcher A. J. Pierzynski en route to becoming the first pitcher aged 40 years or older to win his first four starts in a season in the past 80 years. He also tallied one more run batted in, a double on May 31, 2015. Colón became the first pitcher ever to record wins against one team (the Baltimore Orioles) for seven different clubs. Six pitchers held the previous record of six clubs.

On June 9, 2015, Colón set a new Mets franchise record of most consecutive decisions as a starting pitcher, achieving 26 decisions in 26 consecutive starts. This record was previously held by Dwight Gooden. On September 5, 2015, Justin Bour of the Miami Marlins hit a chopper down the first-base line; Colón charged and made a behind-the-back flip to first for the out. Video of the play garnered widespread media acclaim. In 33 games (31 starts), he finished the 2015 season with a 14–13 record and a 4.16 earned run average. On October 21, 2015, Colón pitched 1 1/3 innings in relief to earn the win in game 4 of the 2015 National League Championship Series and help the Mets sweep the Chicago Cubs.

On October 27, 2015, Colón pitched 2 1/3 innings in relief and took the loss at the end of Game 1 of the World Series, becoming the oldest man ever to lose a World Series game. It was his first World Series appearance since he was a rookie with the Indians in 1997, and the Mets lost the series in five games to the Kansas City Royals.

==== 2016 ====
On December 16, 2015, Colón re-signed with the Mets on a 1-year, $7.25 million contract. He entered the 2016 major league season as the oldest active player. Following the retirement of Maicer Izturis, he became the last active major league player who appeared for the Montreal Expos.

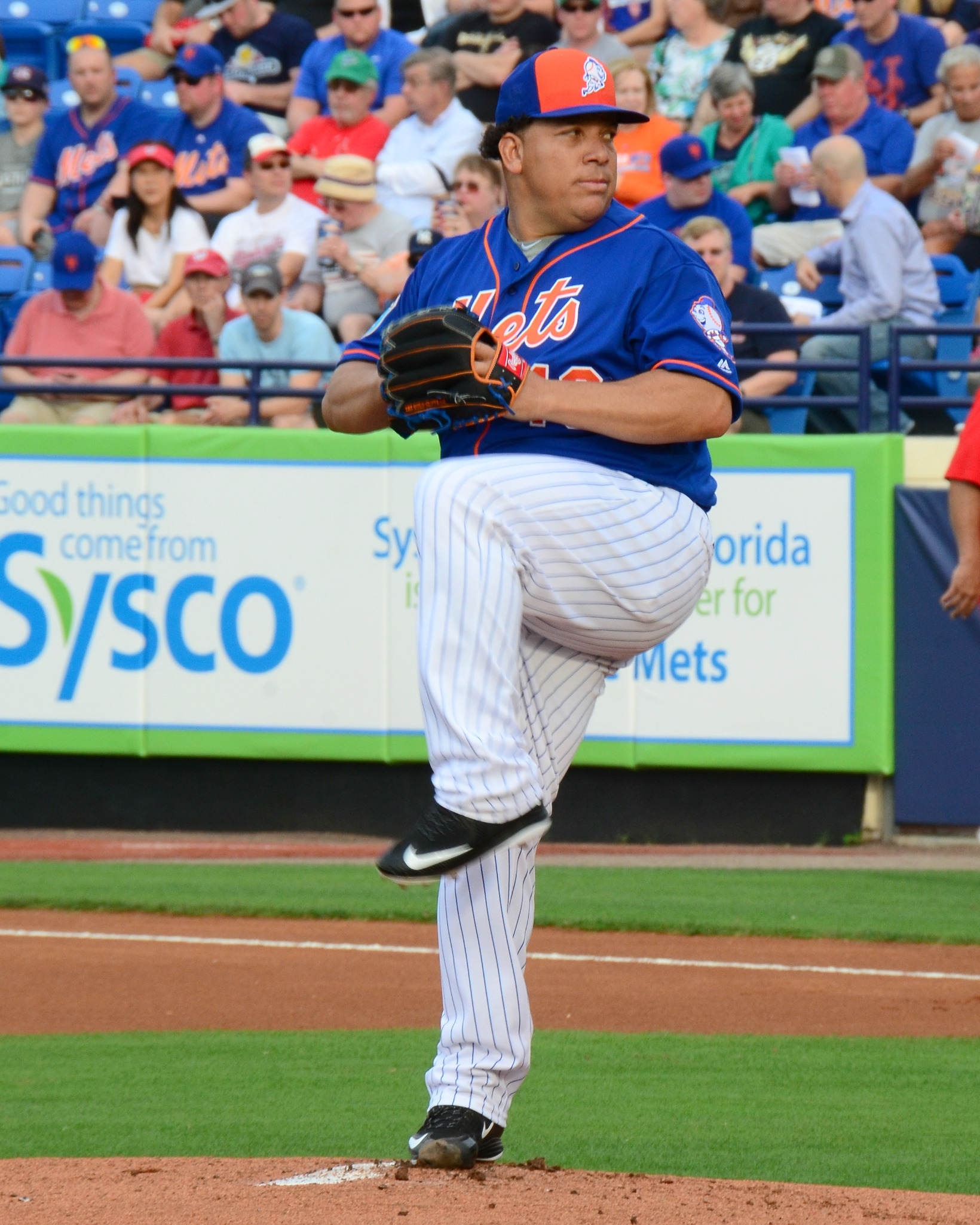
Colón pitching for the Mets in 2016

On May 7, Colón hit his first (and only) major league home run, against the San Diego Padres at Petco Park off James Shields. At 42 years and 349 days old, Colón became the oldest major league player to hit his first home run. He was later awarded NL Player of the Week. On June 21, he was injured when Whit Merrifield hit his pitch right to the pitcher's mound, striking Colón in the thumb; he was immediately taken out of the game. On July 8, Colón was named to the 2016 MLB All-Star Game, replacing Madison Bumgarner. On August 15, he drew a walk after having not been walked in his previous 281 plate appearances, a new MLB record. On October 1, Colón became the 47th player ever to make 500 career starts.

=== Atlanta Braves (2017) ===
On November 17, 2016, Colón signed a one-year, $12.5 million contract with the Atlanta Braves. The Braves designated him for assignment on June 29, 2017, after he put up a 2–8 record with an 8.14 earned run average and 1.78 WHIP in 13 starts. He was released on July 4.

=== Minnesota Twins (2017) ===
On July 7, 2017, Colón signed a minor league contract with the Minnesota Twins. Colón was called up on July 18 to start against the New York Yankees. On August 4, he threw a complete game against the Texas Rangers; at age 44, he became the oldest American League pitcher to record a nine-inning complete-game win since 45-year-old Nolan Ryan did the same in 1992. Later that month he became the 18th pitcher to record a win against all 30 MLB teams, completing the feat against the Arizona Diamondbacks. He became a free agent following the season.

=== Texas Rangers (2018) ===
On February 4, 2018, Colón signed a minor league contract with the Texas Rangers that included an invitation to spring training. He was released on March 24, and signed another minor league contract with Texas on March 26. Colón was called up on April 2 to start against the Oakland Athletics. On April 15, Colón took a perfect game through 7 innings until walking Carlos Correa. Colón went through 7 2/3 innings, allowing one run as the Rangers won 3–1 in 10 innings. On April 28, 2018, he pitched seven innings while allowing six hits and three runs on 98 pitches, being the winning pitcher in a 7–4 result against the Toronto Blue Jays. This was the eleventh team with which he recorded at least one win. A win on June 18 against Kansas City moved him past Juan Marichal, the "Dominican Dandy", to become the pitcher with most career wins from the Dominican Republic. On August 7, in an 11–4 victory against the Seattle Mariners, Colón earned his 246th career pitching win, moving him past Dennis Martinez for the most victories all time by a Latin American-born pitcher. He elected free agency on October 29, and was not signed for the 2019 season.

=== Acereros de Monclova ===
On February 14, 2020, Colón signed with the Acereros de Monclova of the Mexican League. However, he never played in 2020, since the Mexican League season was canceled due to the COVID-19 pandemic. He made his first pre-season appearance for the team on May 1, 2021. Colon made his regular season debut on May 21 and pitched five innings, giving up five hits and one run. In August 2022, he announced that he would retire from baseball following one last season of winter league baseball with the Águilas Cibaeñas of Dominican Professional Baseball League. In 11 starts 61.1 innings of work he went 6-2 with a 4.55 ERA and 40 strikeouts.

On June 2, 2023, Colón officially retired from professional baseball.

== Pitching style ==
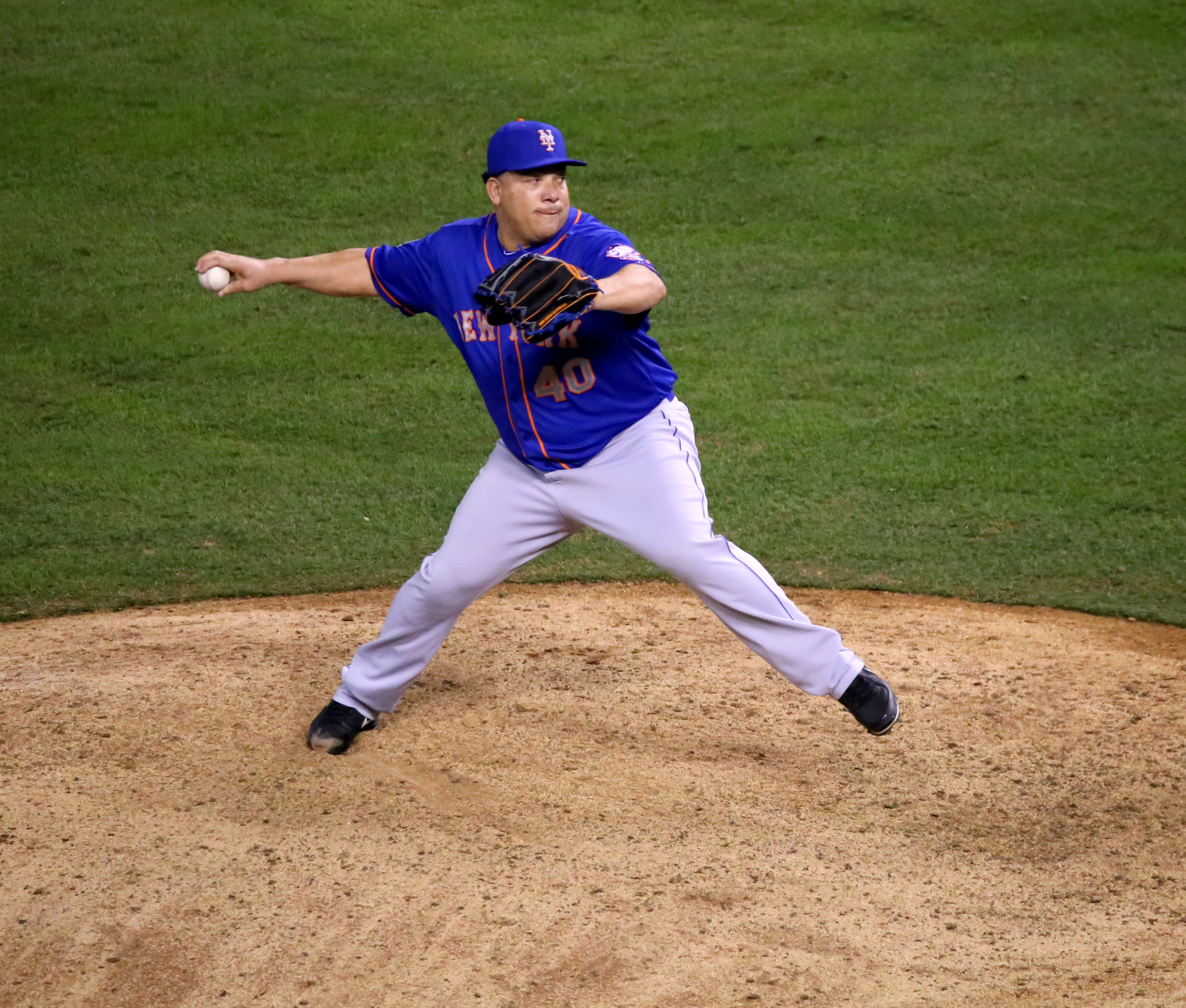
Colón pitching for the Mets during Game 1 of the 2015 World Series

Colón threw four pitches. Early in his career, he had excellent velocity on his four-seam fastball, throwing it in the mid-90s and occasionally touching 100 mph. In his later career, Colón's four-seamer sat at 86–91 mph, and he paired it with a two-seamer at 84–88 mph. This combination of fastballs made up nearly 90% of Colón's pitches, but he also throws a changeup to left-handed hitters, and a slider.

== Awards and accomplishments ==
=== Awards ===
- Cy Young Award (2005)
- 4× MLB All-Star (1998, 2005, 2013, 2016)
- 4× Pitcher of the Month Award (June 1998, May 2002, August 2005, June 2013)
- 5× Player of the Week Award (June 21, 1998; September 24, 2000; September 14, 2003; September 6, 2016; May 8, 2016)
- Players Choice Award for Outstanding Pitcher (2005)
- The Sporting News Pitcher of the Year (2005)
- Set record for most wins by a Latin American pitcher (247 – August 7, 2018)

=== League statistical leader ===
- 2× NL bases on balls per nine innings leader (2015, 2016)
- 2× MLB complete games leader (2002, 2003)
- NL hits allowed leader (2015)
- MLB shutouts leader (2013)
- AL wins leader (2005)

== Nickname ==
Colón was known as "Big Sexy" by his teammates and the media. He applied for a trademark on the Big Sexy nickname and plans on making apparel out of it.

== Personal life ==
Colón's wife, Rosanna, and their four sons live in New Jersey. On September 30, 2014, Colón and his wife became US citizens. Colón met his wife in the Dominican Republic when he was 13 years old.

In 2015, Colón was sued in Manhattan by a Washington Heights woman seeking child support for her son and daughter, who were fathered by Colón during his marriage. On June 17, 2016, Colón and Alexandra Santos agreed to a deal that included child support payments.

== See also ==
- List of Major League Baseball annual shutout leaders
- List of Major League Baseball career games started leaders
- List of Major League Baseball career innings pitched leaders
- List of Major League Baseball career strikeout leaders
- List of Major League Baseball career wins leaders
- List of Major League Baseball players from the Dominican Republic
- List of Major League Baseball players suspended for performance-enhancing drugs
- Los Angeles Angels award winners and league leaders

Preceded by Hideki Irabu; Derek Lowe; Barry Zito	American League Pitcher of the Month; June 1998; May 2002; August 2005	Succeeded by David Cone; Mark Mulder; José Contreras
