= Villa Montellano =

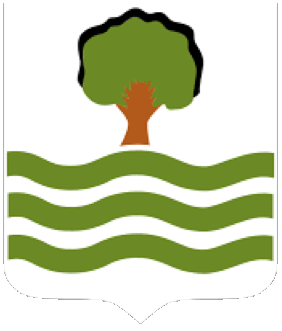
- Coat of arms

- Villa Montellano in the Dominican Republic
- Coordinates: 19°43′48″N 70°36′0″W
- Country: Dominican Republic
- Province: Puerto Plata

Area
  - Total: 73.89 km^{2} (28.53 sq mi)

Population (2012)
  - Total: 19,029
  - Density: 257.5/km^{2} (667.0/sq mi)
  - Urban: 8,967
- Municipal Districts: 0

Villa Montellano is a town in the Puerto Plata province of the Dominican Republic, and formerly called Ingenio Montellano.

== Sources ==
- – World-Gazetteer.com
