= Los Conucos =

Los Conucos Conuquero/a
- Los Conucos in the Dominican Republic
- Coordinates: 19°48′0″N 70°59′0″W
- Country: Dominican Republic
- Province: Puerto Plata

Population (2008)
  - Total: 3,347
- Time zone: UTC-4 (AST)
- Postal code: 57500
- Area codes: 1-809, 1-829, 1-849

Los Conucos is a small town in the Puerto Plata province of the Dominican Republic. The town is 111 miles (179 kilometers) north-west of the country's capital Santo Domingo.
