= Luperón, Dominican Republic =

Luperón
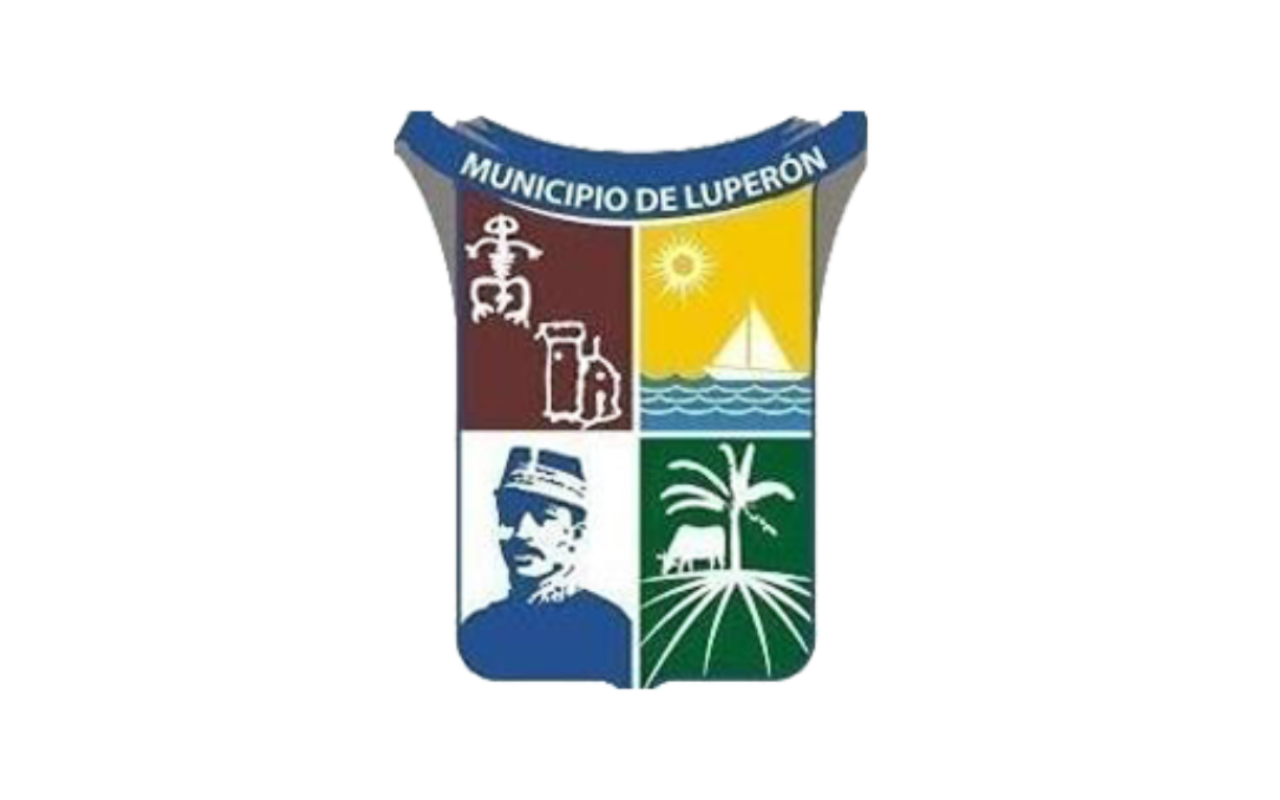
- Flag

- Luperón in the Dominican Republic
- Coordinates: 19°54′0″N 70°57′0″W
- Country: Dominican Republic
- Province: Puerto Plata

Area
  - Total: 272.07 km^{2} (105.05 sq mi)

Population (2012)
  - Total: 20,259
  - Density: 74.462/km^{2} (192.86/sq mi)
- Municipal Districts: 3
- Climate: As

Luperón is a municipality in the Puerto Plata province of the Dominican Republic. It lies in a coastal bay in the north of the country and is a small tourist center. The town is named after the Dominican president, Gregorio Luperón, who is depicted on the city's seal.

== Name and history ==
The town of Luperon was formerly known as Blanco (White) or Pueblo Blanco (White Town), possibly after the many Spaniards who came to trade timber. Although there is no record of early inhabitants, it is said that Christopher Columbus had to enter the bay to protect his ships from a storm. Columbus named it "Bahía de Gracias" (Thanksgiving Bay), the current official name.

== Government and politics ==
The current mayor is Román Israel Brito of the Partido Revolucionario Moderno (PRM), or Modern Revolutionary Party.

Dictator Rafael Leónidas Trujillo intended to elevate Luperón to the status of a province, but he was assassinated in May 1961, a few months before the scheduled change.

== Bahía de Gracias ==
Due to its shape and location, Bahía de Gracias (Bahía de Luperón or Luperón Bay)—is ideal for sheltering from hurricanes. A large number of private yachts, including sailboats and motor vessels, anchor or moor in the bay during the Caribbean hurricane season (June 1 to November 1 every year) as they pass between the Bahamas, Puerto Rico, and other points in the Caribbean. Among sailors, the harbor's safe reputation has earned it the nickname "safest hurricane hole in the Caribbean." Boats have access to over a hundred moorings, the Puerto Blanco Marina, Marina Tropical boatyard, and a public dinghy dock.

The bay contains extensive mangroves, unique to Hispaniola, which provide habitat for many species of fish, crabs, and mollusks, as well as larger animals such as turtles, spotted eagle rays, and occasional manatees and dolphins. During the dry season (generally December through April) bioluminescence can be observed in the water at night. The Puerto Blanco marina provides boat and kayak rentals for tourists who wish to explore the bay.

== Beaches ==
Luperón is known for its beaches, which make it a prime vacation destination. The beaches are free to the public, and popular among locals on Sundays.

The oceanfront beach Playa Grande was previously home to Luperon Beach Resort, one of the largest employers in the town. However, the resort closed in late 2011 or early 2012, leaving many large abandoned structures which continue to degrade. The beach, and grounds adjacent to it, are maintained by the Ministry of Tourism, which conducts weekly cleanup efforts to keep the beach pristine. The palm-lined beachfront is popular for swimming. Several small beachfront restaurants and bars are open daily, offering music, drinks, fresh coconuts and Dominican cuisine. One offers a private bathroom, and there is a public bathroom near the entrance.

Located inside Bahía de Gracias, Playa Chiquita offers shallow waters and dinghy access for boaters moored in the bay. Though it has fewer amenities than Playa Grande, it has fewer waves and many shade trees, making it a popular destination for families, picnics and parties.

== Notable families ==
Three of the better-known families in Luperón are the Morrobel, Cueto, and Villamán families. They were the town's pioneers. Their numbers continue to grow. In recent years, a sizeable population of Luperonenses have moved abroad (most notably to Spain), often retaining their careers in the resort and catering industries.

== Recreation and sports ==
Every year, the town holds a heavily attended softball tournament. The games take place every Saturday and Sunday, at the local field. The Williams family is noted for baseball expertise in Luperón.

Basketball is also popular, with a basketball tournament being held every summer. The tournament rules permit up to two non-Luperón-born players per team, and a few players come from other municipalities. Unlike softball, the basketball games are played at night, also during the weekends. Attendees are charged a small fee to enter.

Cockfights take place every Friday afternoon in Luperón's arena. Money is made from bets and from the entrance fee. The sport is legal in the Dominican Republic and it is followed by thousands in the country. However, compared to most towns in Cibao (the island's north), cockfighting is less popular here.

== Climate ==
Luperón has a tropical savanna climate with a pronounced dry season in summer and a wet season in winter (Köppen climate classification: As).

Climate data for Luperón (1961–1990)
Month	Jan	Feb	Mar	Apr	May	Jun	Jul	Aug	Sep	Oct	Nov	Dec	Year
Record high °C (°F)	33.0 (91.4)	34.5 (94.1)	35.0 (95.0)	36.0 (96.8)	36.4 (97.5)	36.5 (97.7)	37.0 (98.6)	36.0 (96.8)	36.4 (97.5)	36.8 (98.2)	35.8 (96.4)	33.5 (92.3)	37.0 (98.6)
Mean daily maximum °C (°F)	28.9 (84.0)	29.3 (84.7)	30.0 (86.0)	30.7 (87.3)	32.0 (89.6)	33.3 (91.9)	33.2 (91.8)	33.1 (91.6)	33.2 (91.8)	32.6 (90.7)	30.5 (86.9)	29.1 (84.4)	31.3 (88.3)
Mean daily minimum °C (°F)	18.3 (64.9)	18.2 (64.8)	18.7 (65.7)	19.6 (67.3)	20.8 (69.4)	21.5 (70.7)	21.7 (71.1)	21.7 (71.1)	21.3 (70.3)	21.0 (69.8)	20.0 (68.0)	18.7 (65.7)	20.1 (68.2)
Record low °C (°F)	12.6 (54.7)	12.0 (53.6)	13.4 (56.1)	14.8 (58.6)	14.5 (58.1)	18.1 (64.6)	18.2 (64.8)	18.0 (64.4)	15.2 (59.4)	17.8 (64.0)	15.4 (59.7)	13.4 (56.1)	12.0 (53.6)
Average rainfall mm (inches)	140.6 (5.54)	107.7 (4.24)	92.5 (3.64)	98.6 (3.88)	107.3 (4.22)	25.6 (1.01)	40.4 (1.59)	38.1 (1.50)	56.3 (2.22)	102.6 (4.04)	216.5 (8.52)	222.5 (8.76)	1,248.7 (49.16)
Average rainy days (≥ 1.0 mm)	9.8	7.1	6.0	7.2	6.9	3.2	4.3	4.1	4.3	6.8	11.7	11.5	82.9
Source 1: NOAA
Source 2:

== Sources ==
- – World-Gazetteer.com
