= Guananico =

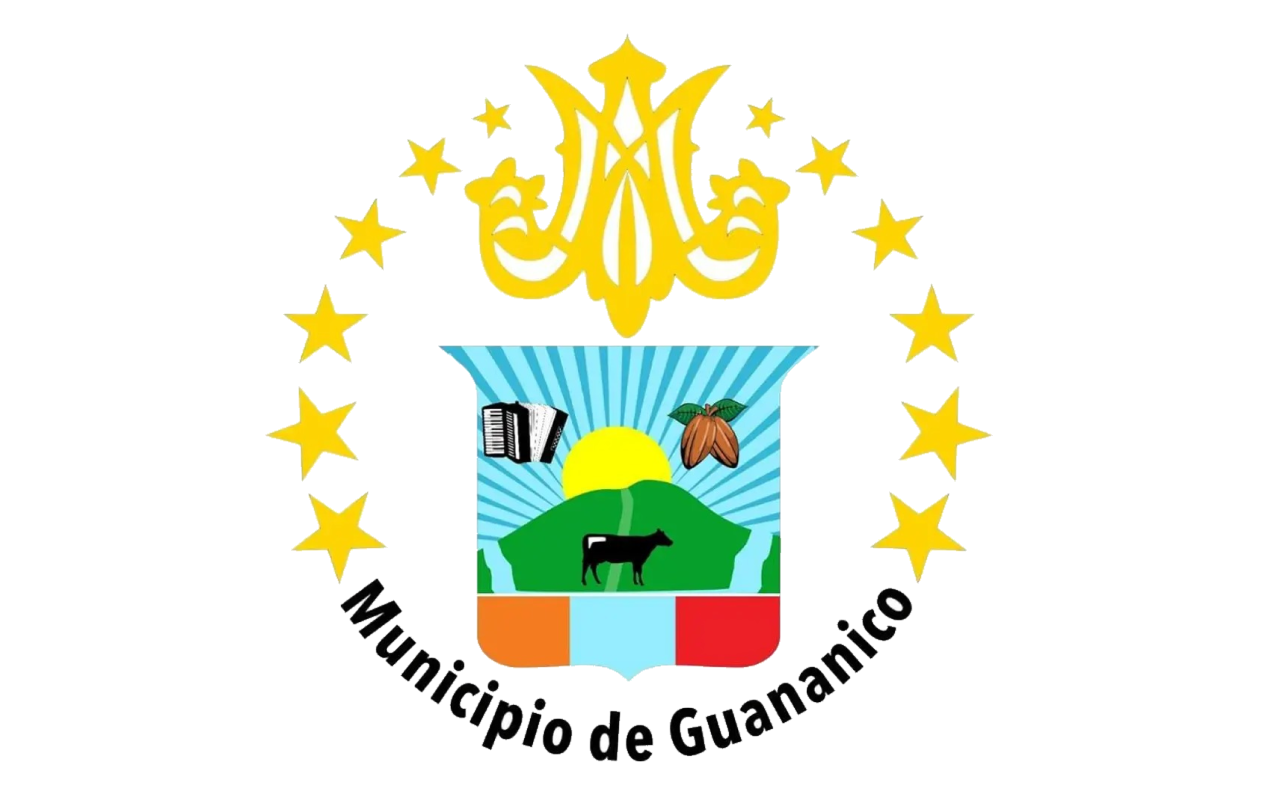
- Flag

- Guananico in the Dominican Republic
- Coordinates: 19°43′12″N 70°55′12″W
- Country: Dominican Republic
- Province: Puerto Plata
- Established: March 21, 1963

Area
  - Total: 57.32 km^{2} (22.13 sq mi)

Population (2012)
  - Total: 8,954
  - Density: 156.2/km^{2} (404.6/sq mi)
  - Urban: 3,025
- Municipal Districts: 0

Guananico is a town in the Dominican Republic, situated in the Puerto Plata Province. It has an area of 58.02 square kilometers (22.40 sq mi) and a population of 8,954 of which 3,025 live in the urban part and 5,929 in the rural part. It is the youngest, smallest, and of the smallest population of the eight cities in the province of Puerto Plata.

== History ==
Guananico is a toponym of indigenous origin and according to compiled versions of different sources and bibliographic dates, it is associated with Guacanagarix, a 15th-century chief of Hispaniola. Reliable sources affirm that the city was founded between 1865 and 1870, right around the annexation of Spain by Pedro Santana in 1861.

== Economic aspects ==
Its economic base is agriculture, cultivating coffee and cocoa, sowing in lesser quantities kidney beans, corn, and watermelons. It has many fruit trees, like those of the avocado, mango, bitter orange, regular orange, and the tamarind.

There are about 3,312.5 hectares (8,185 acres) suitable for cultivating principally cocoa, coffee, guineos, yuccas, bananas, and some citrus fruits. With respect to livestock, there are around 15,000 cattle and pigs.

There is also a high proportion of people dedicated to the trade of oranges to that of the small venture of moto concho service, public transportation, and tourism.
