= La Jaiba, Dominican Republic =

La Jaiba
- Location within the Dominican Republic
- Coordinates: 19°48′0″N 71°9′0″W
- Country: Dominican Republic
- Province: Puerto Plata

Population (2008)
  - Total: 4,484
- Area codes: 809, 829

La Jaiba is a small town in the Puerto Plata province of the Dominican Republic.

== Sources ==
http://nona.net/features/map/placedetail.1529439/La%20Jaiba/

- – World-Gazetteer.com
