= Imbert, Dominican Republic =

Imbert
- Imbert in the Dominican Republic
- Coordinates: 19°45′0″N 70°49′48″W
- Country: Dominican Republic
- Province: Puerto Plata

Area
  - Total: 170.70 km^{2} (65.91 sq mi)

Population (2012)
  - Total: 30,514
  - Density: 178.76/km^{2} (462.98/sq mi)
- Municipal Districts: 0

Imbert is a town in the Puerto Plata province of the Dominican Republic. The town is named after José María Imbert.

== Climate ==
Climate data for Imbert, Dominican Republic (1961–1990)
Month	Jan	Feb	Mar	Apr	May	Jun	Jul	Aug	Sep	Oct	Nov	Dec	Year
Record high °C (°F)	34.9 (94.8)	36.5 (97.7)	35.5 (95.9)	35.7 (96.3)	37.3 (99.1)	37.7 (99.9)	39.0 (102.2)	38.5 (101.3)	37.3 (99.1)	37.5 (99.5)	38.5 (101.3)	35.3 (95.5)	39.0 (102.2)
Mean daily maximum °C (°F)	28.4 (83.1)	28.9 (84.0)	29.6 (85.3)	30.1 (86.2)	31.3 (88.3)	33.2 (91.8)	33.1 (91.6)	33.4 (92.1)	33.5 (92.3)	32.7 (90.9)	30.0 (86.0)	28.2 (82.8)	31.0 (87.8)
Mean daily minimum °C (°F)	16.8 (62.2)	16.7 (62.1)	17.1 (62.8)	17.9 (64.2)	19.3 (66.7)	20.2 (68.4)	20.4 (68.7)	20.3 (68.5)	20.2 (68.4)	19.8 (67.6)	18.9 (66.0)	17.5 (63.5)	18.8 (65.8)
Record low °C (°F)	12.2 (54.0)	12.0 (53.6)	11.0 (51.8)	12.5 (54.5)	13.0 (55.4)	11.7 (53.1)	15.0 (59.0)	12.8 (55.0)	16.3 (61.3)	14.7 (58.5)	13.5 (56.3)	10.8 (51.4)	10.8 (51.4)
Average rainfall mm (inches)	169.6 (6.68)	148.5 (5.85)	126.6 (4.98)	171.7 (6.76)	148.0 (5.83)	84.9 (3.34)	73.1 (2.88)	75.3 (2.96)	88.7 (3.49)	141.6 (5.57)	226.8 (8.93)	264.6 (10.42)	1,719.4 (67.69)
Average rainy days (≥ 1.0 mm)	10.2	8.2	7.0	8.1	9.1	7.0	6.7	6.5	6.7	9.3	11.6	12.7	103.1
Source: NOAA

== Sources ==
- – World-Gazetteer.com
