= La Jaiba, Cuba =

Barrio in Matanzas, Cuba

La Jaiba
- Reparto
- Location within Cuba
- Country: Cuba
- Province: Matanzas
- Municipality: Matanzas
- Ward: Pueblo Nuevo

La Jaiba is a division (reparto) and barrio in the municipality of Matanzas, Cuba.

== Geography ==
La Jaiba is in the ward (consejo popular) of Pueblo Nuevo, Matanzas. La Jaiba borders Reparto Naranjal Sur and the San Juan River to the north-west. To the north it borders Reparto Pueblo Nuevo. To the south and east it borders Reparto Camilo Cienfuegos.

== Media ==
In La Jaiba there are 3 radio stations, these include Radio Reloj, Radio Rebelde, and Radio 26.
