= Los Bellosos =

- Location within the Dominican Republic
- Coordinates: 19°50′0″N 71°1′0″W
- Country: Dominican Republic
- Province: Puerto Plata

Population (2008)
  - Total: 12,414
- Area codes: 809, 829

Los Bellosos is a town in the Puerto Plata province of the Dominican Republic. The town is 113 miles (182 kilometers) north-west of the country's capital Santo Domingo.

== Sources ==
http://nona.net/features/map/placedetail.1530656/Los%20Bellosos/

- – World-Gazetteer.com
